= Carrier Strike Group 3 =

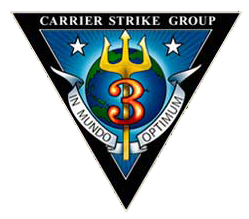
- Carrier Strike Group Three crest
- Active: 1 October 2004 to date.
- Country: United States of America
- Branch: United States Navy
- Type: Carrier Strike Group
- Role: Naval air/surface warfare
- Part of: U.S. Third Fleet
- Garrison/HQ: Naval Station San Diego, California
- Nickname: Abraham Lincoln Carrier Strike Group
- Motto: In Mundo Optimum (The Best in the World)
- Engagements: Operation Enduring Freedom; Iraq War; War in Afghanistan
- Website: Official Website

Commanders
- Commander: Rear Admiral Robert E. Loughran
- Chief of Staff: Captain Matthew A. McNealy
- Command Master Chief: CMDCM Oneil Lewis
- Notable commanders: Bruce W. Clingan

Aircraft flown
- Electronic warfare: EA-18G Growler
- Fighter: F/A-18E/F Super Hornet; F-35C Lightning
- Helicopter: MH-60R Seahawk; MH-60S Knighthawk
- Reconnaissance: E-2D Hawkeye
- Transport: CMV-22B Osprey

Carrier Strike Group 3 (CSG-3 or CARSTRKGRU 3) is a U.S. Navy carrier strike group. Carrier strike groups gain and maintain sea control as well as project naval airpower ashore. The aircraft carrier USS Abraham Lincoln (CVN-72) is the group's current flagship. Other units assigned as of 2024 include Carrier Air Wing Nine, the Arleigh Burke-class destroyers USS O'Kane (DDG-77), USS Frank E. Petersen Jr. (DDG-121), and USS Spruance (DDG-111), which are part of Destroyer Squadron 21. (Note: Destroyer Squadron 21 consists of the Arleigh Burke-class destroyers USS O’Kane, USS Frank E. Petersen Jr., and USS Spruance.)

Between 2005 and 2013, the group made five deployments to the U.S. Fifth Fleet supporting U.S. ground forces in Iraq, and Afghanistan. On 18 December 2011, strike group aircraft flew the final carrier-based air mission over Iraq, effectively ending U.S. naval support for Operation New Dawn.

== Historical background ==
=== Carrier Division Three ===
The aircraft carrier Wasp was assigned to Carrier Division Three from November 1940. In April 1941, a Central Atlantic Neutrality Patrol was established under Admiral A.B. Cook, based at Bermuda. It comprised Carrier Division Three, the cruisers Quincy and Vincennes, and Destroyer Squadron 11. On 7 December 1941, in the Atlantic Fleet, Carrier Division Three comprised Wasp and Ranger under Rear Admiral A.B. Cook. Commander Carrier Division Three served as Commander Task Force 77 during the Korean War. In 1966, Carrier Division Three was built around Enterprise, flying missions in the Gulf of Tonkin off Vietnam.

=== Carrier Group Three ===
On 30 June 1973, Carrier Division 3 was redesignated Carrier Group 3. U.S. Navy carrier battle groups have, since the mid-Cold War period, maintained a pattern of deployments to trouble spots, beginning with an overhaul, individual ship training, battle group training, group preparation exercise, and then the deployment. On returning home, the cycle begins once more. As part of these deployments, the Carl Vinson carrier battle group participated in Exercise RIMPAC '84, RIMPAC '86, RIMPAC '98, PACEX '89, Exercise Rugged Nautilus, Operation Southern Watch, Operation Desert Strike, Operation Desert Fox, and Operation Iraqi Freedom. From 1989 to 1991, USS Carl Vinson served as the flagship for Carrier Group 3. During this period, Carrier Group 3 was one of three battle groups that took part in PACEX '89.

In August 1990, Commander, U.S. Seventh Fleet was deployed to Bahrain in order to serve as Commander, U.S. Naval Forces Central Command (ComUSNAVCENT) following the Iraqi invasion of Kuwait. Since ComUSNAVCENT operated from on board ship, he established NAVCENT-Riyadh as a staff organization to provide continuous Navy representation at United States Central Command headquarters. This mission was assigned initially to Commander, Carrier Group Three. During succeeding months, the NAVCENT-Riyadh staff was augmented substantially but remained small, relative to the United States Army Central and CENTAF staffs. In November, the NAVCENT-Riyadh command was transferred from COMCARGRU 3 to Commander, Cruiser-Destroyer Group 5. This change resulted in the Navy flag officer at NAVCENT Riyadh's remaining relatively junior to other Service representatives, particularly the Air Force.

In the middle of 1992, the U.S. Navy made some organizational changes. Each of the Navy's twelve carrier battle groups was planned to consist of an aircraft carrier; an embarked carrier air wing; cruiser, destroyer, and frigate units; and two nuclear-powered attack submarines. The chart below shows the ships and aircraft of the group after the reorganization.

Carrier Group Three, late 1992

| Guided-Missile Cruisers | Destroyer Squadron 21 | Carrier Air Wing 11 squadrons embarked aboard USS Abraham Lincoln (CVN-72) | |
|---|---|---|---|
| USS Shiloh (CG-67) | USS Fitzgerald (DDG-62) | Fighter Squadron 213: F-14A | Airborne Early Warning Squadron 117: E-2C |
| USS Princeton (CG-59) | USS John Paul Jones (DDG-53) | Fighter Squadron 114: F-14A | Sea Control Squadron 29: S-3B |
| USS Texas (CGN-39) | USS Ingersoll (DD-990) | Strike Fighter Squadron 94: F/A-18C | Helicopter Anti-Submarine Squadron 6: SH-60F, HH-60H |
| USS California (CGN-36) | USS John Young (DD-973) | Strike Fighter Squadron 22: F/A-18C | —— |
| USS Sterett (CG-31) | USS Ingraham (FFG-61) | Attack Squadron 95: A-6E, KA-6D | —— |
| —— | USS Gary (FFG-51) | Electronic Warfare Squadron 135: EA-6B | —— |

From June 1993, Commander Carrier Group 3 had his flag aboard Abraham Lincoln. In 1993, the battle group provided support to the multinational military forces assigned to Operation Restore Hope in Somalia, and the group subsequently made three Western Pacific/Persian Gulf deployments for Operation Southern Watch and Operation Vigilant Sentinel. On 13 May 1997 Carrier Air Wing Eleven was reassigned to Commander, Carrier Group 3 and the USS Carl Vinson.

Carrier Group 3 formed the core of the naval power during the initial phase of Operation Enduring Freedom in 2001. At the time the group comprised USS Carl Vinson (CVN-70), Destroyer Squadron 9 and Carrier Air Wing Eleven. Commander, Carrier Group 3, Rear Admiral Thomas E. Zelibor, arrived in the Arabian Sea on 12 September 2001 and was subsequently designated Commander Task Force 50 (CTF 50), commanding multiple carrier task groups and coalition forces. The Task Force conducted strikes against Al Quida and Taliban forces in Afghanistan. Task Force 50 comprised over 59 ships from six nations including six aircraft carriers, stretching over 800 nautical miles.

Rear Admiral Evan M. Chanik was the last commander of Carrier Group 3. During his tenure, Admiral Chanik led the group through a reorganized Inter-Deployment Training Cycle which greatly compressed the training required for overseas deployment. On 1 October 2004, Carrier Group Three was redesignated as Carrier Strike Group Three.

== Command structure ==
The strike group commander is responsible for unit-level training, integrated training, and material readiness for the group's ships and aviation squadrons. When it is not deployed, the group reports to Commander, U.S. Third Fleet which directs the group's pre-deployment training and certifications including its Composite Training Unit Exercises. When deployed beyond U.S. coastal waters, the group comes under the command of the numbered fleet commander in the area in which it is operating – either Third, Fourth, Fifth, Sixth, or Seventh Fleets. When deployed in this fashion, the group utilizes a task force or task group designator, for example, Task Group 50.1 in the Fifth Fleet area.

Group commanders since 2004 have included:

| • Rear Admiral Bruce W. Clingan | (June 2004 – September 2005) |
| • Captain Scott A. Berg | (September 2005 – November 2005) |
| • Rear Admiral Kevin M. Quinn | (November 2005 – September 2007) |
| • Rear Admiral M. Stewart O'Bryan | (September 2007 – September 2008) |
| • Rear Admiral Mark A. Vance | (September 2008 – September 2009) |
| • Rear Admiral Joseph P. Aucoin | (September 2009 – May 2011) |
| • Rear Admiral Craig S. Faller | (May 2011 – April 2012) |
| • Rear Admiral Charles M. Gaouette | (April 2012 – October 2012) |
| • Rear Admiral Troy M. "Mike" Shoemaker | (October 2012 – May 2013) |
| • Captain William C. Minter | (May 2013 – September 2014) |
| • Rear Admiral Michael E. Smith | (September 2014 – September 2015) |
| • Rear Admiral Ronald A. Boxall | (October 2015 – April 2016) |
| • Rear Admiral Marcus A. Hitchcock | (April 2016 – August 2017) |
| • Rear Admiral Michael A. Wettlaufer | (August 2017 – June 2019) |
| • Rear Admiral Fred I. Pyle | (June 2019 – April 2020) |
| • Rear Admiral James A. Aiken | (April 2020 – August 2021) |
| • Rear Admiral Jeffrey T. Anderson | (August 2021 – September 2022) |
| • Rear Admiral Kevin P. Lenox | (September 2022 – May 2024) |
| • Rear Admiral Adan G. Cruz | (May 2024 – April 2025) |
| • Rear Admiral Todd E. Whalen | (April 2025 – Present) |

== Operational history ==
=== 2005 deployment ===
On 17 January 2005, Carl Vinson departed Bremerton, Washington, with Carrier Air Wing Nine embarked for a six-month deployment, which included several months in the Persian Gulf supporting U.S. forces fighting the War in Iraq. On 30 January 2005, the group departed San Diego following the completion of its 22-day pre-deployment Joint Task Force Exercise.

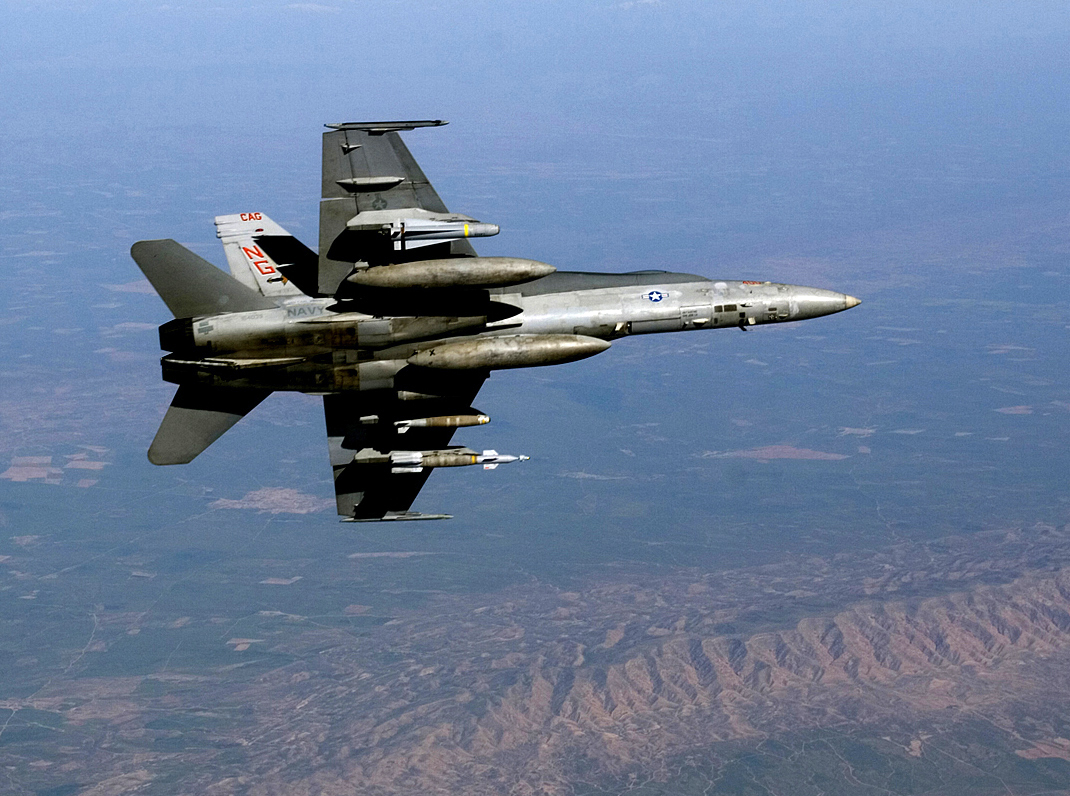
F/A-18C from VFA-147 over Iraq (27 March 2005)

In total, the group launched more than 6,500 sorties, totaling more than 20,000 flight hours, in support of Multi-National Force - Iraq troops and various maritime interdiction operations, including 2,600 flight hours logged by its four F/A-18 strike-fighter squadrons. Destroyer Squadron 31 conducted more than 80 boardings in conjunction with British, Italian, Australian, Canadian and regional forces.

On 11 June 2005, Mustin rendered assistance in response to a distress call from the Iranian fishing dhow Henif. A boat transported an ill Iranian fisherman to Mustin, where he was subsequently transferred to Vinson by helicopter. Once aboard Vinson, the fisherman was taken to the ship's infirmary where he underwent tests. The fisherman was apparently suffering from a severe allergic reaction. He was treated, and after a short recovery period, he was returned to the Henif via one of the carrier's boats.

The group completed its 2005 deployment at Naval Station Norfolk on 31 July 2005. Vinson then began a scheduled 36-month Refueling and Complex Overhaul, prior to becoming flagship for Carrier Strike Group One. The new group flagship, John C. Stennis, changed its homeport to Bremerton in January 2005, and once there, underwent an 11-month overhaul. Reflecting the reduced responsibilities while the ships were undergoing overhauls, Rear Admiral Clingan was succeeded by Captain Scott A. Berg in September 2005 as carrier strike group commander. Rear Admiral Kevin M. Quinn subsequently relieved Captain Berg in November 2005.

2005 deployment force composition

| CARSTRKGRU 3 Warships/Units | Carrier Air Wing Nine (CVW-9) squadrons embarked aboard flagship USS Carl Vinson (CVN-70) | |
|---|---|---|
| USS Antietam (CG-54) | Marine Fighter Squadron 323 (VMFA-323): FA-18C(N) Hornet | Sea Control Squadron 33 (VS-33): S-3B Viking |
| USS O'Kane (DDG-77) | Fighter Squadron 154 (VFA-154): F/A-18F Super Hornet | Helicopter Squadron 8 (HS-8): HH-60H/SH-60F Seahawk |
| USS Mustin (DDG-89) | Strike Fighter Squadron 147 (VFA-147): FA-18C(N) Hornet | Fleet Logistics Support Squadron 40 (VRC-40), Det. 4: C-2A Greyhound |
| USS Camden (AOE-2) | Strike Fighter Squadron 146 (VFA-146): FA-18C Hornet | —— |
| USS Olympia (SSN-717) | Electronic Attack Squadron 138 (VAQ-138): EA-6B Prowler | —— |
| EOD Mobile Unit 11, Detach. 9 | Carrier Airborne Early Warning 112 (VAW-112): E-2C Hawkeye | —— |

=== 2007 deployment ===
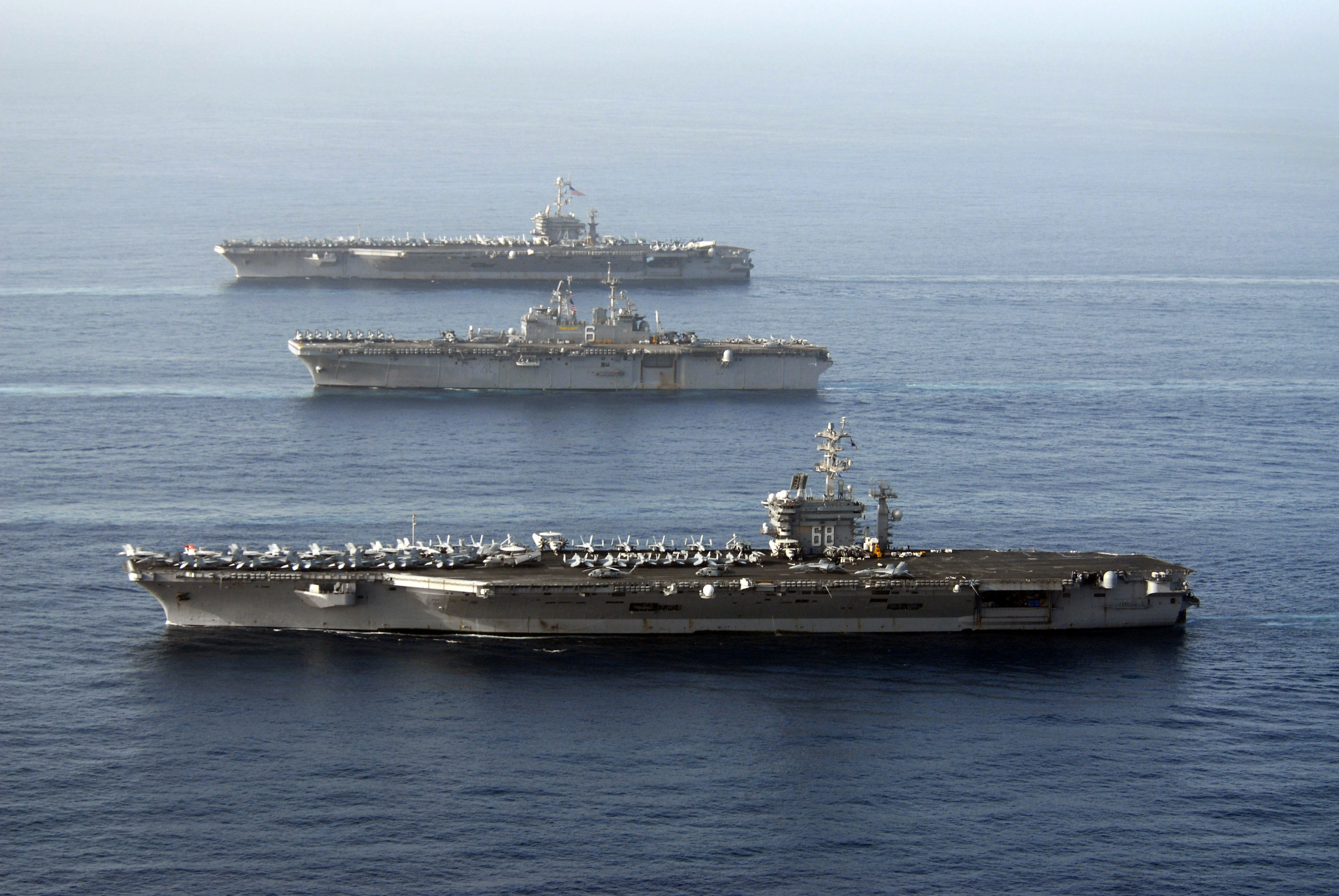
John C. Stennis, Bonhomme Richard, and Nimitz in Gulf of Oman (22 May 2007)

Stennis departed from its homeport in Bremerton, Washington, on 16 January 2007, spent one day in port on-loading Carrier Air Wing Nine onto the carrier, and the strike group departed San Diego on 20 January 2006 for its 2007 deployment.

During its 2007 deployment, Carrier Air Wing Nine flew more than 7,900 sorties providing more than 22,000 flight hours and dropping nearly 90,000 pounds of ordnance in support of the International Security Assistance Force operating on the ground in Afghanistan and Iraq. The guided-missile destroyers O'Kane and Preble were primarily responsible for carrying out Maritime Security Operations, Maritime Interdiction Operations, and Visit, Board, Search and Seizure operations for the strike group during the deployment.

On 23 May 2007, Stennis, along with eight other warships including the aircraft carrier Nimitz and amphibious assault ship Bonhomme Richard, passed through the Strait of Hormuz into the Persian Gulf (pictured). US Navy officials said it was the largest such move of warships since 2003. The group subsequently participated in Expeditionary Strike Force (ESF) training while simultaneously providing close-air support to coalition ground forces in Iraq and Afghanistan. The ESF training brought together Carrier Strike Group 3, Carrier Strike Group 11 led by Nimitz, and Bonhomme Richard Expeditionary Strike Group to test their ability to plan and conduct multi-task force operations across a broad spectrum of naval disciplines.

Thereafter, the group participated in Exercise Valiant Shield off the coast of Guam between 7–14 August 2007. The exercise brought together more than 30 ships, including carrier strike groups led by the Kitty Hawk and Nimitz; 280 aircraft; and more than 20,000 service members from the U.S. Navy, U.S. Air Force, U.S. Marine Corps, and U.S. Coast Guard. Valiant Shield 2007 tested the military's ability to rapidly bring together joint forces in response to any regional contingency. Valiant Shield was the last operational portion of the group's 2007 deployment.

The group entered Pearl Harbor on 20 August 2007. The strike group returned to San Diego on 27 August 2007, and the carrier John C. Stennis returned to its homeport on 31 August 2007.

2007 deployment force composition

| CARSTRKGRU 3 Warships/Units | Carrier Air Wing Nine (CVW-9) squadrons embarked aboard flagship USS John C. Stennis (CVN-74) | |
|---|---|---|
| USS Antietam (CG-54) | Marine Attack Fighter Squadron 323 (VMFA-323): FA-18C(N) Hornet | Sea Control Squadron 31 (VS-31): 8 S-3B Viking |
| USS Preble (DDG-88) | Strike Fighter Squadron 154 (VFA-154): 12 FA-18F Super Hornet | Helicopter Squadron 8 (HS-8): 2 HH-60H Seahawk & 4 SH-60F Seahawk |
| USS O'Kane (DDG-77) | Strike Fighter Squadron 147 (VFA-147): 12 FA-18C(N) Hornet | Fleet Logistics Support Squadron 40 (VRC-40), Det. 4: 4 C-2A Greyhound |
| USS Paul Hamilton (DDG-60) | Strike Fighter Squadron 146 (VFA-146): 12 FA-18C Hornet | —— |
| USNS Bridge (T-AOE-10) | Electronic Attack Squadron 138 (VAQ-138): 4 EA-6B Prowler | —— |
| EOD Unit 11, Det. 11 | Carrier Airborne Early Warning 112 (VAW-112): 4 E-2C Hawkeye NP | —— |

2007 deployment exercises and port visits

| Number | Regional exercises | | | | Port visits | | Notes |
| Number | Duration | US force | Bilateral or multilateral partners | Operating area | Location | Dates | Notes |
|---|---|---|---|---|---|---|---|
| 1st: | —— | Carrier Strike Group 3 | —— | —— | Singapore | 19–23 Jul 2007 | |
| 2nd: | —— | Carrier Strike Group 3 | —— | —— | Hong Kong | 28 Jul – 1 August 2007 | |
| 3rd: | 7–14 Aug 2007 | Carrier Strike Group 3 | Exercise Valiant Shield 2007 | Guam operating area | Pearl Harbor | 20 August. 2007 | |

=== 2009 deployment ===
John C. Stennis departed Bremerton on 13 January 2009, and the group departed Naval Air Station North Island on 17 January 2009 after embarking Carrier Air Wing Nine. Carrier Air Wing Nine flew more than 7250 sorties, consisting of approximately 12,747 flight hours with a sortie completion rate of 97 percent during its 2009 deployment.

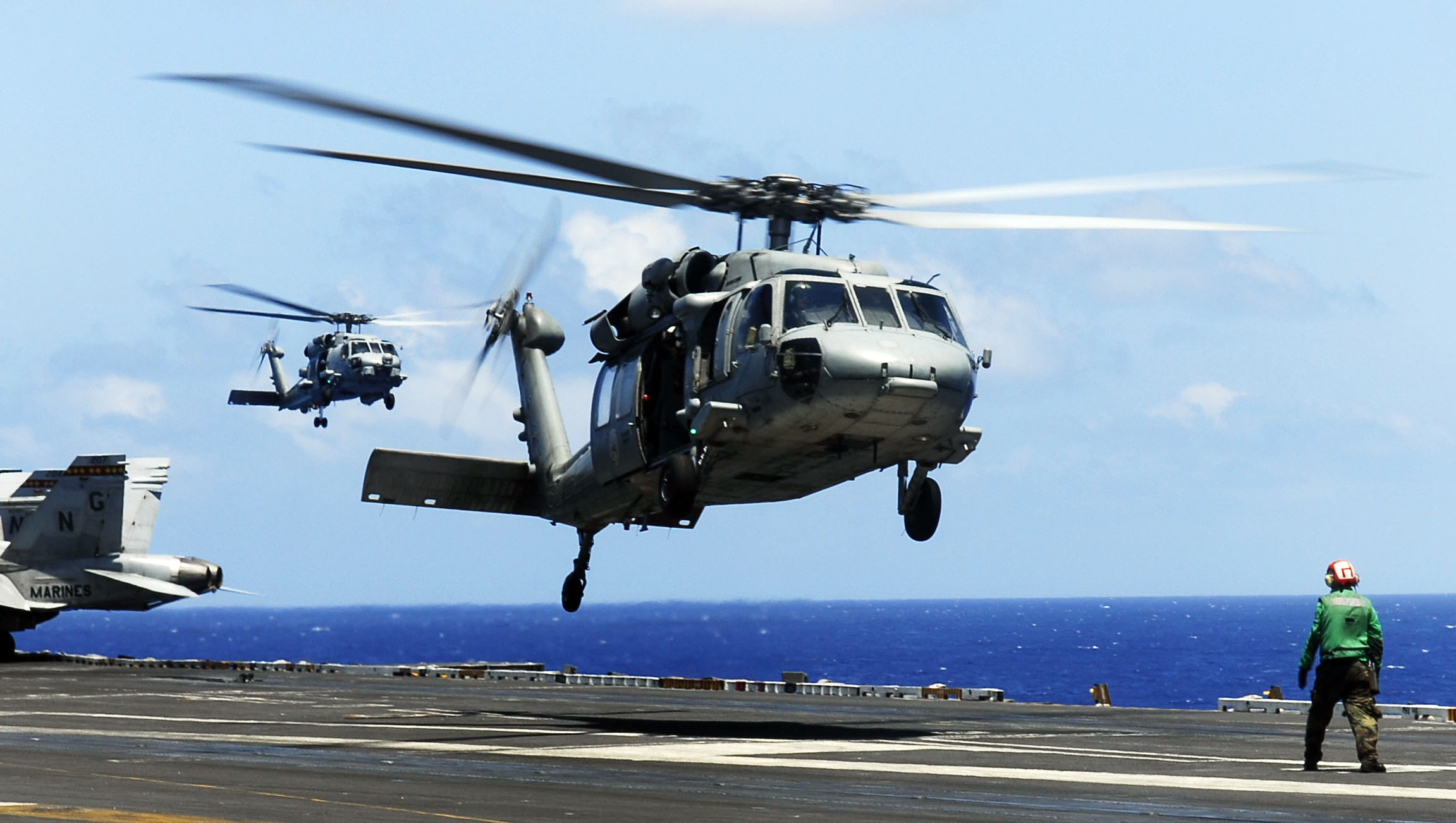
MH-60S Knight Hawk from HSC-8

Helicopter Maritime Strike Squadron 71 (HSM-71), a new component to Carrier Air Wing Nine, was the first squadron of its kind to embark on board a carrier as part of a carrier air wing (pictured). The squadron flew more than 4,690 hours with a 95 percent sortie completion rate and earned the right to fly the Enlisted Aviation Warfare Pennant. The highlight for the squadron occurred during the undersea warfare exercise when HSM-71 deployed multiple aircraft to practice engagements on U.S. and Japanese submarines. The squadron kept three helicopters aloft throughout the entire four-day exercise for a total of 222 flight hours and conducted 28 simulated attacks on two U.S. and two Japanese submarines.

The strike group participated in Exercise Key Resolve/Foal Eagle which began on 28 February 2009. Key Resolve/Foal Eagle was held in the aftermath of the sinking of the ROK corvette Cheonan and the shelling of Yeonpyeong Island by North Korea. During the exercise, the aircraft carrier Stennis was overflown by two Russian Ilyushin Il-38 maritime patrol aircraft on 16 March and two Tupolev Tu-95 long-range bombers on 17 March. Both time the Russian aircraft were intercepted and escorted by F/A-18 Hornets until the Russian aircraft left the exercise area.

The strike group then split. Both Kidd and Preble returned to port on 16 June 2009. John C. Stennis and Antietam sailed north to the Gulf of Alaska to participate in Operation Northern Edge, held between 15–26 June 2009. Stennis returned to port on 10 July 2009.

2009 deployment force composition

| CARSTRKGRU 3 Warships | Carrier Air Wing Nine (CVW-9) squadrons embarked aboard flagship USS John C. Stennis (CVN-74) | |
|---|---|---|
| USS Antietam (CG-54) | Marine Attack Fighter Squadron 323 (VMFA-323): 10 FA-18C(N) Hornet | Electronic Attack Squadron 138 (VAQ-138): 4 EA-6B Prowler |
| USS Kidd (DDG-100) | Strike Fighter Squadron 146 (VFA-146): 10 FA-18C Hornet | Carrier Airborne Early Warning 112 (VAW-112): 4 E-2C Hawkeye NP |
| USS Preble (DDG-88) | Strike Fighter Squadron 154 (VFA-154): 12 FA-18F Super Hornet | Helicopter Maritime Strike Squadron 71 (HSM-71): 4 MH-60R Seahawk |
| —— | Strike Fighter Squadron 147 (VFA-147): 12 FA-18E Super Hornet | Helicopter Sea Control Squadron 8 (HSC-8): 4 MH-60S Knight hawk |
| —— | | Fleet Logistics Support Squadron 40 (VRC-40), Det. 4: 4 C-2A Greyhound |

2009 deployment exercises and port visits

| Number | Regional exercises | | | | Port visits | | Notes |
| Number | Duration | U.S. Force | Bilateral/Joint Partner(s) | Operating Area | Location | Dates | Notes |
|---|---|---|---|---|---|---|---|
| 1st: | 10 February 2009 | Carrier Strike Group 3 | Undersea Warfare Exercise: JMSDF | Western Pacific | Hong Kong | 17 February 2009 | |
| 2nd: | — | Carrier Strike Group 3 | — | — | Sasebo, Japan | 27 February 2009 | |
| 3rd: | 28 Feb – 30 April 2009 | Carrier Strike Group 3 | Key Resolve/Foal Eagle: South Korea | Korean Theater of Operations | Busan, Republic of Korea | 11 March 2009 | |
| 4th: | — | Carrier Strike Group 3 | — | — | Laem Chabang, Thailand | 9–13 Apr 2009 | |
| 5th: | — | Carrier Strike Group 3 | — | — | Singapore | 24 April. 2009 | |
| 6th: | 15–26 Jun 2009 | Stennis, Antietam | Northern Edge: Alaskan Command | Gulf of Alaska | Pearl Harbor | 27 May – 10 June 2009 | |

=== 2011–2012 deployment ===
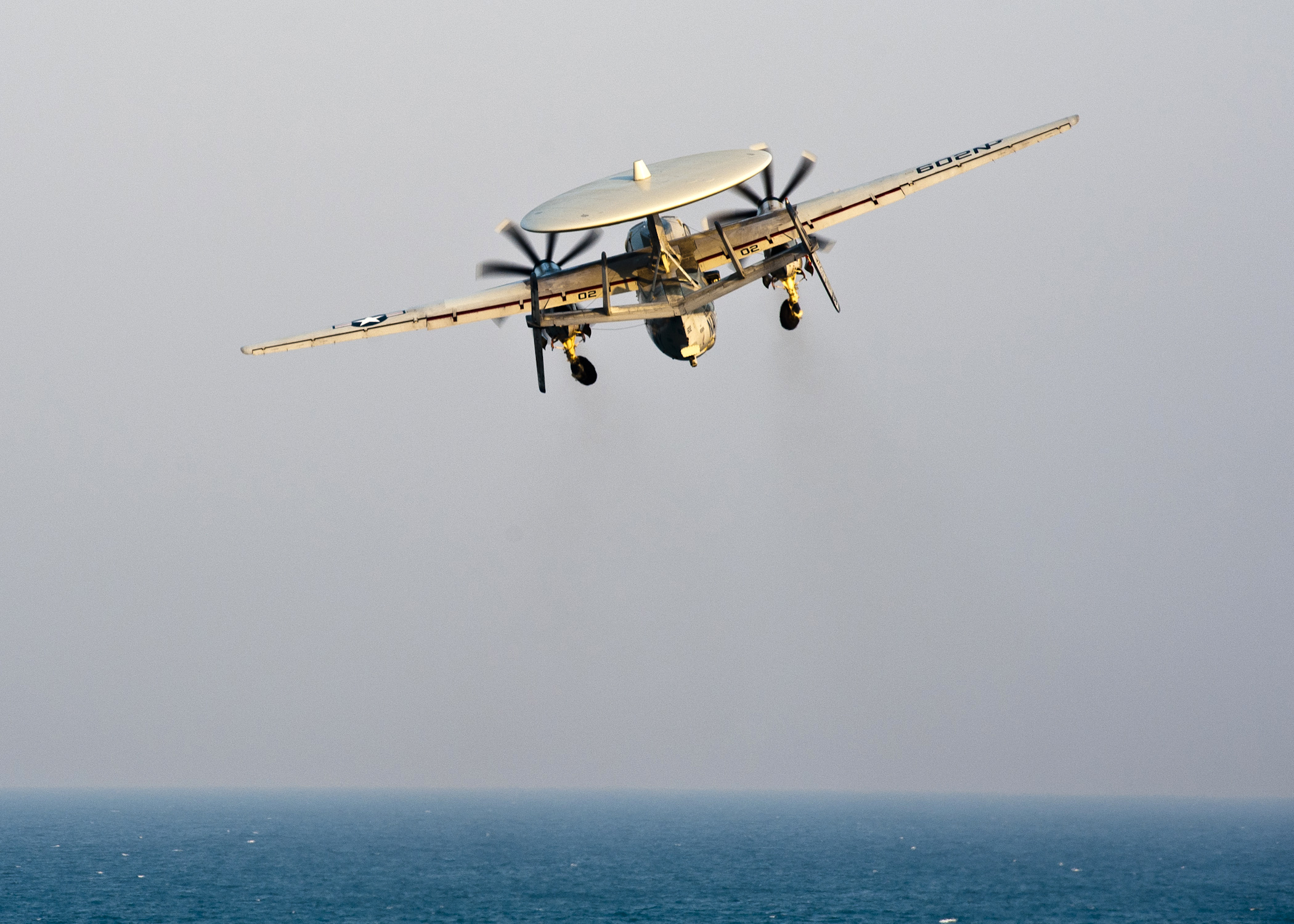
Final flight over Iraq (18 December 2011)

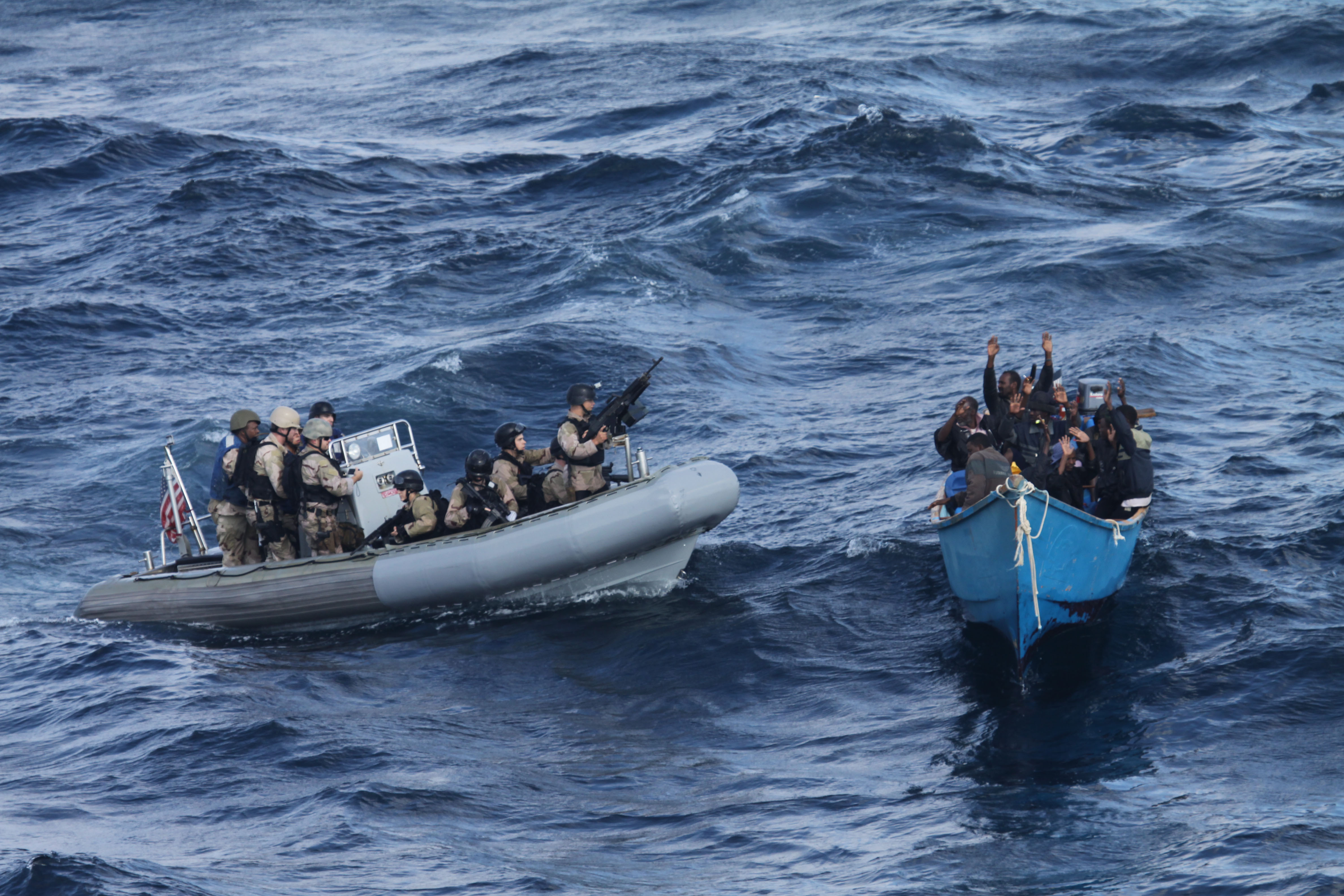
Anti-piracy boarding (19 December 2011)

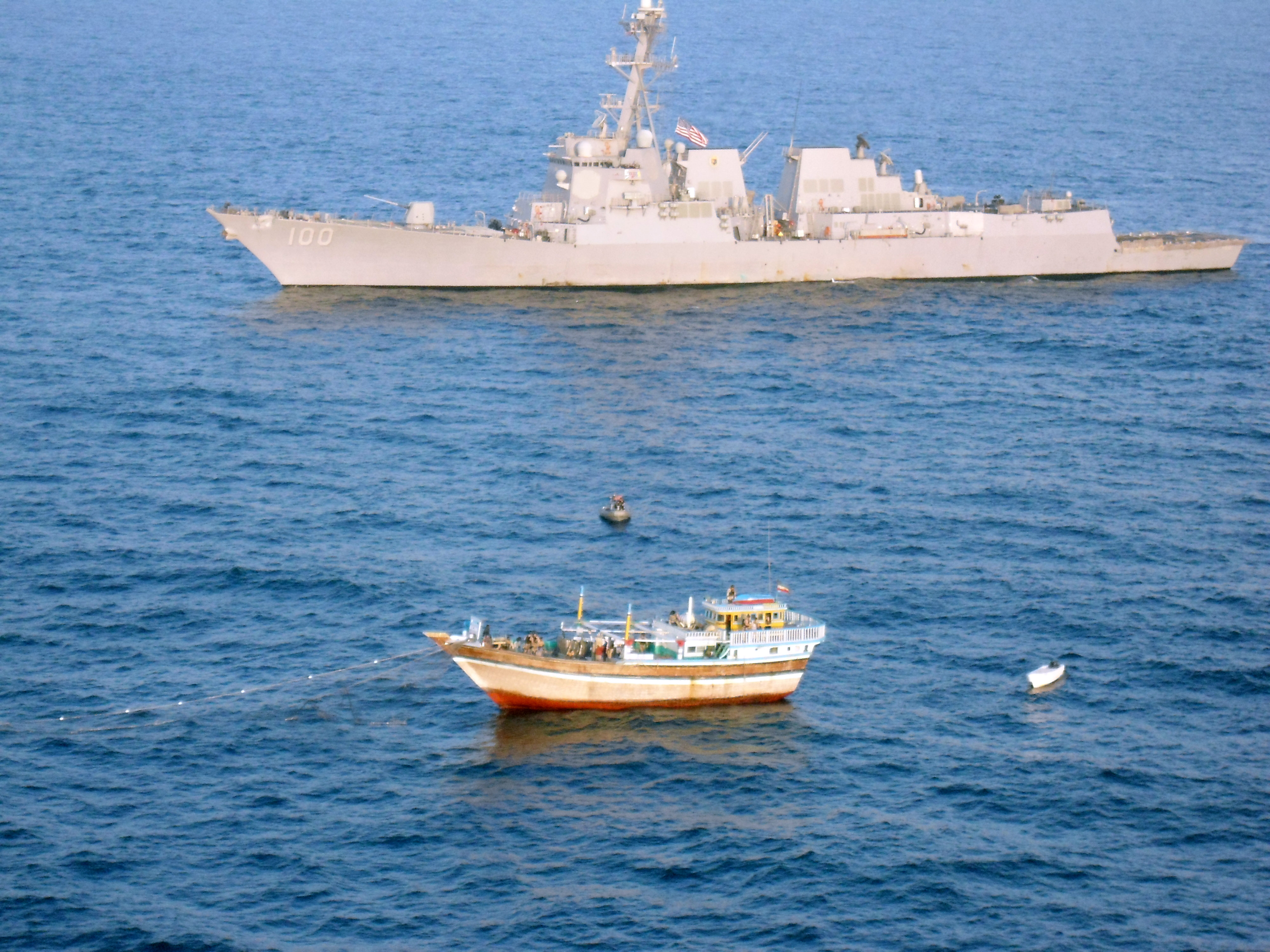
Al Molai rescue (5 January 2012)

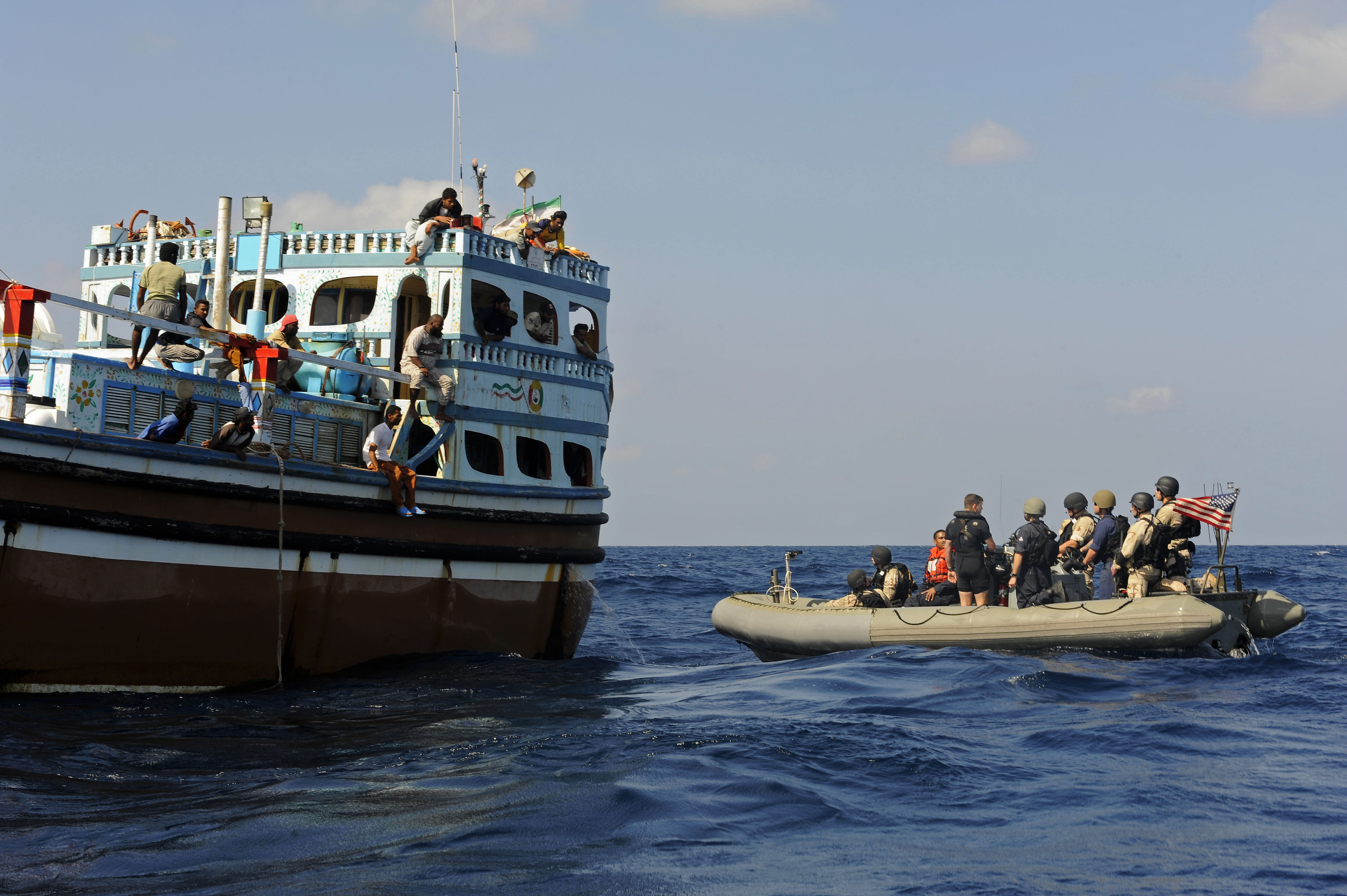
Al Mamsoor rescue (18 January 2012)

On 25 July 2011, the aircraft carrier John C. Stennis departed from its homeport of Naval Base Kitsap-Bremerton, Washington. Stennis was subsequently joined by Carrier Air Wing Nine, Destroyer Squadron Twenty-one, and the guided-missile cruiser Mobile Bay. On 29 July 2011, the strike group departed from Naval Air Station San Diego near San Diego, California, for its 2011–2012 deployment.

The first port-of-call for the group was to have been Manila, Philippines, but that port-call was cancelled because of Typhoon Mina. On 13 October 2011, the guided-missile destroyer Kidd was directed to join Carrier Strike Group 5 to provide disaster relief to flood-ravaged Thailand.

During the deployment, the strike group and Carrier Air Wing Nine launched a combined total of 13,389 sorties in support of Operation New Dawn and Operation Enduring Freedom – Afghanistan. On 18 December 2011, the strike group's aircraft flew the final carrier-based air sortie over Iraq, effectively ending U.S. naval support for Operation New Dawn. The final command-and-control mission for U.S. forces over Iraq was flown by an E-2C Hawkeye (pictured) from Airborne Early Warning Squadron 112, catapulting off the carrier Stennis at 7:32 am and returning at 11:04 a.m, both local time.

While operating with Combined Task Force 151, on 13 December 2011, the destroyer Pinckney disrupted a group of suspected pirates south of Yemen near the Internationally Recommended Transit Corridor. At approximately 8:40 am local time, the merchant vessel M/V Nordic Apollo reported to United Kingdom Maritime Trade Operations, Dubai, of being fired upon by pirates in a skiff. At approximately 11:00 am, the M/V Heather, operating 30 nautical miles from Nordic Apollo, reported suspicious activity by a skiff. CTF-151 commander Rear Admiral Kaleem Shaukat, Pakistan Navy, ordered Pinckney to investigate. Pinckney got underway and launched its MH-60R helicopter which located a suspicious skiff. Once under observation, the helicopter reported that the skiff had nine suspected pirates aboard, as well as several ladders, weapons and fuel containers that the suspected pirates attempted to cover up or throw overboard. As Pinckney closed, the skiff stopped and the suspected pirates threw their weapons overboard, which were identified as five AK-47 rifles, one rocket propelled grenade (RPG) launcher. and three RPG rounds. Pinckney conduct a boarding using their visit, board, search and seizure (VBSS) team (pictured), and once aboard, the VBSS team confirmed that there were nine suspected pirates, one grappling hook, 36 barrels of fuel, and 75 and 45 horsepower outboard engines. The VBSS team scuttled one outboard motor and left the skiff with enough fuel and water to return to shore.

On 5 January 2012, at approximately 12:30 p.m local time, an SH-60S Seahawk helicopter from guided-missile destroyer Kidd detected a suspected pirate skiff alongside the Iranian-flagged fishing dhow Al Molai operating in the northern Arabian Sea. Simultaneously, the Kidd received a distress call was from the master of the Al Molai claiming to be held captive by pirates. The Kidd dispatched a visit, board, search and seizure team that boarded the Al Molai (pictured) and subsequently detained 15 suspected pirates who had been holding a 13-member Iranian crew hostage for several weeks. The pirates did not resist the boarding, quickly surrendered, and were detained on the Al Molai by the Kidd boarding party until the next morning, 6 January 2012, when they were transferred to the aircraft carrier John C. Stennis where the incident was reviewed for potential prosecution. According to the Iranian vessel's crew, the Al Molai had been pirated and used as a "mother ship" for pirate operations throughout the Persian Gulf during the preceding 40–45 days. The pirates forced the Al Molai crew to live in harsh conditions under the constant threat of violence with limited supplies and medical aid. The Kidd VSBB team provided the Al Molai crew with food, water, and medical care, and the Al Molai master thanked the VBSS team for their assistance.

On 18 January 2012, at 7:53 am local time, an MH-60R Seahawk helicopter from the squadron HSM-71 spotted the Iranian fishing vessel Al Mamsoor disabled in the Arabian Sea. The vessel was in a sinking condition, and the helicopter alerted the guided-missile destroyer Dewey which rendered assistance. Dewey dispatched a visit, board, search and seizure (VBSS) team (pictured) which discovered that the Al Mamsoor was in a sinking condition for the previous three days. The VBSS team provided food, water, medical, and hygienic supplies to the Iranian mariners, and after confirming Iranian nationals' safety, departed the scene.

On 27 December 2011, Stennis concluded a four-day port visit to Jebel Ali in the United Arab Emirates. It then steamed through the Strait of Hormuz to the North Arabian Sea to provide combat air support to coalition ground forces in Afghanistan. On 3 January 2012, following the end of Velayat 90, a 10-day Iranian military exercise in international waters near the Strait of Hormuz, the Iranian Army chief of staff, General Ataollah Salehi, warned the United States to not send the Stennis back into the Persian Gulf. This initiated the 2011–12 Strait of Hormuz dispute between the United States and Iran over access through the strait.

On 27 February 2012, the strike group completed its seven-month deployment. The cruiser Mobile Bay and destroyers Pinckney, Kidd, Dewey, and Wayne E. Meyer returned to Naval Base San Diego. Stennis stopped in San Diego before returning to its homeport of Naval Base Kitsap, Washington, on 28 February 2012.

2011–2012 deployment force composition

| CARSTRKGRU 3 Warships | Carrier Air Wing Nine (CVW-9) squadrons embarked aboard flagship USS John C. Stennis (CVN-74) | |
|---|---|---|
| USS Mobile Bay (CG-53) | Strike Fighter Squadron 192 (VFA-192): 10 F/A-18C | Carrier Airborne Early Warning 112 (VAW-112): 4 E-2C |
| USS Wayne E. Meyer (DDG-108) | Strike Fighter Squadron 97 (VFA-97): 10 F/A-18C | Fleet Logistics Support Squadron 40 (VRC-40), Det. 1: 2 C-2A |
| USS Dewey (DDG-105) | Strike Fighter Squadron 41 (VFA-41): 12 F/A-18F | Helicopter Sea Combat Squadron Squadron 8 (HSC-8): 7 MH-60S |
| USS Kidd (DDG-100) | Strike Fighter Squadron 14 (VFA-14): 12 F/A-18E | Helicopter Maritime Strike Squadron 71 (HSM-71): 11 MH-60R |
| USS Pinckney (DDG-91) | Electronic Attack Squadron 133 (VAQ-133): 4 EA-6B | —— |

2011–2012 deployment exercises and port visits

| Number | Regional Exercises | | | | Port Visits | | Notes |
| Number | Duration | U.S. Forces | Bilateral/Multilateral Partner(s) | Operating Area | Location | Dates | Notes |
|---|---|---|---|---|---|---|---|
| 1st: | —— | Kidd | —— | —— | Apra Harbor, Guam | 27 August 2011 | |
| 2nd: | 9 Aug | Carrier Strike Group 3 | Undersea Warfare Exercise | Hawaiian operating area | Port Klang, Malaysia | 4–8 Sep 2011 | |
| 3rd: | —— | Pinckney | —— | —— | Singapore | 7 September 2011 | |
| 4th: | —— | Kidd | —— | —— | Phuket, Thailand | 8–11 Sep 2011 | |
| 5th: | —— | John C. Stennis | —— | —— | Al Hidd, Bahrain | 21–24 Sep 2011 | |
| 6th: | —— | Kidd | —— | —— | Sihanoukville, Cambodia | 20–25 Sep 2011 | |
| 7th: | Various | Kidd, Pinckney | CARAT 2011 | Various | Muara, Brunei | 29 Sep to 2 October 2011 | |
| 8th: | —— | Wayne E. Meyer | —— | —— | Singapore | 13–17 Oct 2011 | |
| 9th: | —— | Pinckney | —— | —— | Incheon, ROK | 17 Oct | |
| 10th: | —— | Pinckney | —— | —— | Yokosuka, Japan | 27 October 2011 | |
| 11th: | —— | Wayne E. Meyer, Dewey, Pinckney | —— | —— | Phuket, Thailand | 11–14 Nov 2011 | |
| 12th: | —— | John C. Stennis | —— | —— | Jebel Ali, UAE | 14 November 2011 | |
| 13th: | —— | John C. Stennis | —— | —— | Jebel Ali, UAE | 23–27 Dec 2011 | |
| 14th: | —— | John C. Stennis, Mobile Bay, Dewey, Pinckney | —— | —— | Singapore | 26–30 Jan 2012 | |
| 15th: | —— | Kidd | —— | —— | Port Klang, Malaysia | 26 January 2012 | |
| 16th: | —— | Wayne E. Meyer | —— | —— | Manila, Philippines | 29 January 2012 | |
| 17th: | —— | Carrier Strike Group 3 | —— | —— | Pearl Harbor | 17 February 2012 | |

=== 2012–2013 deployment ===
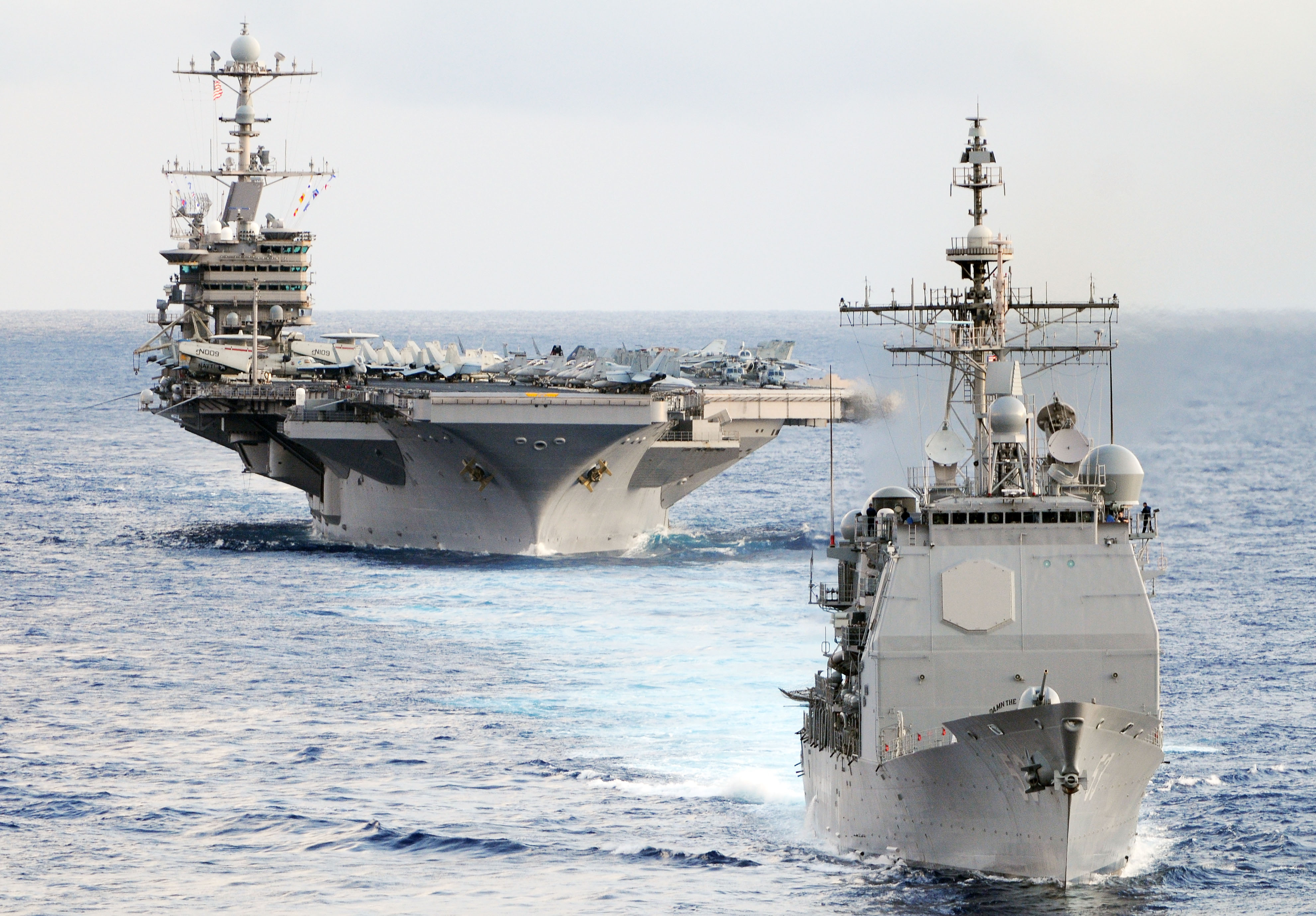
Valiant Shield 2012 (20 September 2012)

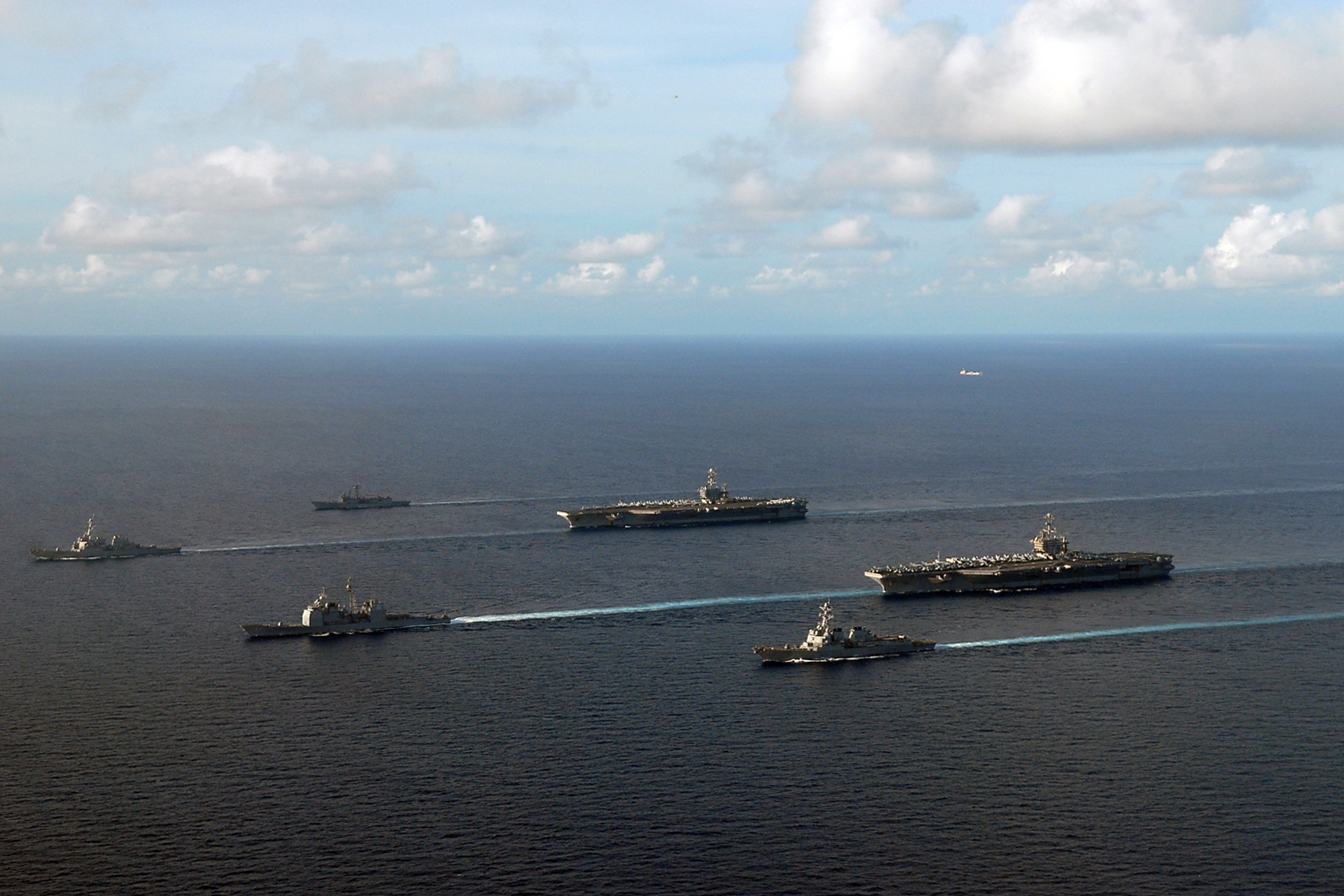
Andaman Sea (12 October 2012)

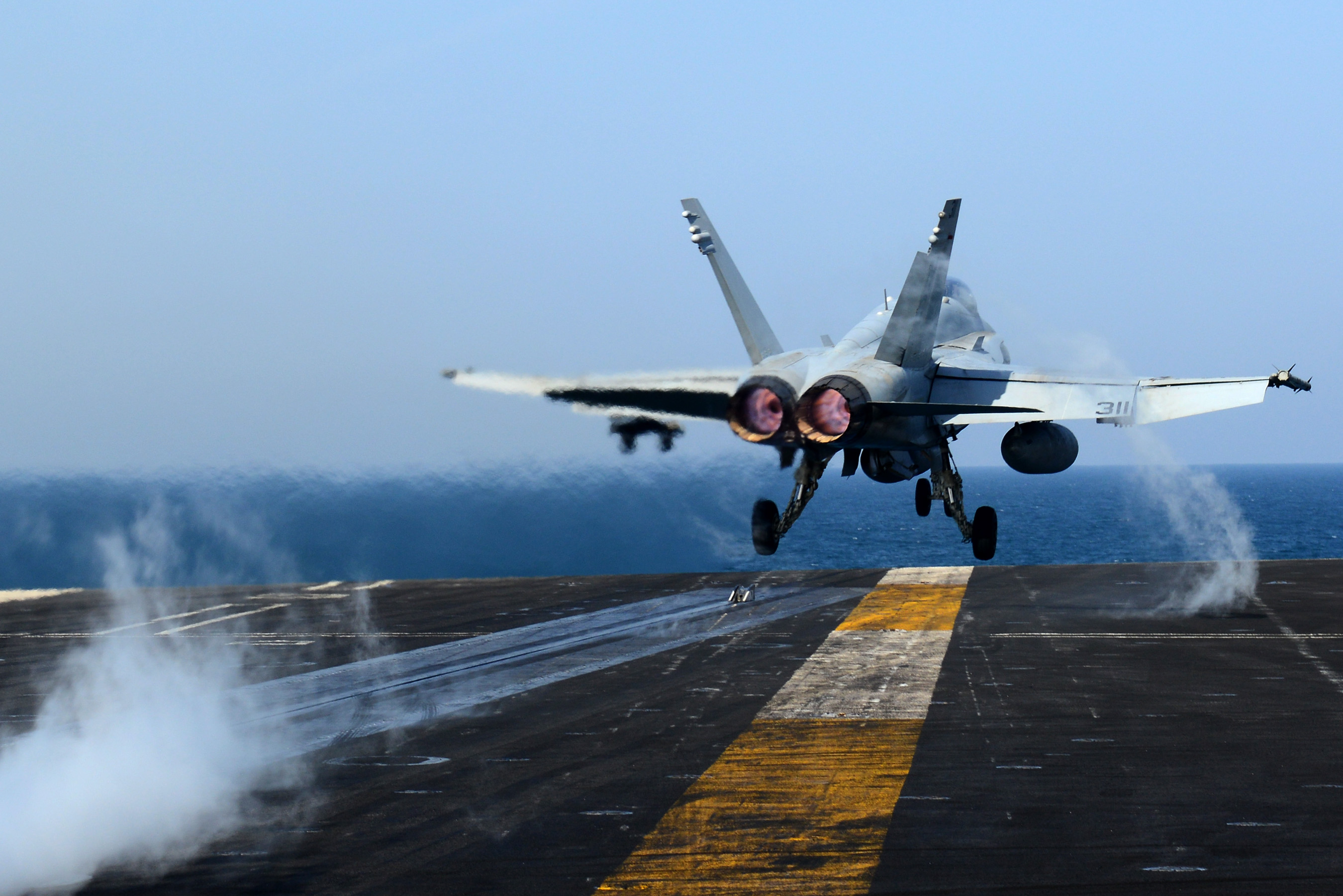
Combat air operations (1 January 2013)

Between 29 June and 17 July 2012, Stennis conducted Fleet Replacement Squadron Carrier Qualifications and Sustainment Exercises off the coast of southern California. On 27 August 2012, four months ahead of schedule, the group departed for an eight-month U.S. Fifth Fleet deployment under the command of Rear Admiral Charles M. Gaouette. On 30 August 2012, Stennis arrived at Naval Air Station North Island, California, to embark Carrier Air Wing Nine, departing on 1 September 2012 with the guided-missile cruiser Mobile Bay. On 31 August 2012, the carrier Stennis embarked additional Carrier Air Wing Nine personnel during a port visit to Pearl Harbor, Hawaii, departing on 1 September 2012, with the guided-missile Paul Hamilton joining the strike group.

On 11 September 2012, the group came under U.S. Seventh Fleet command and soon began taking part in Exercise Valiant Shield 2012 off Guam (pictured). The deployment of two carrier strike groups for this exercise coincided with the ongoing Senkaku Islands dispute between China and Japan. After four weeks underway, the first port call of the deployment followed at Kota Kinabalu, Malaysia, the first such visit by a U.S. aircraft carrier to that port. Following its port visit to Phuket, Thailand, the group participated in joint operations with Carrier Strike Group 5 in the Andaman Sea (pictured).

On 17 October 2012, the strike group entered the Fifth Fleet area, joining Carrier Strike Group 8 in support of Operation Enduring Freedom in Afghanistan, maritime security operations, and theater security cooperation missions. On 21 October 2012, Carrier Air Wing Nine began strikes supporting the International Security Assistance Force in Afghanistan. On 22 March 2013, the group concluded air operations over Afghanistan, with its aircraft having flown around 1,200 sorties totaling over 7,400 flight hours.

On 27 October 2012, Fifth Fleet commander Vice Admiral John W. Miller ordered the temporary reassignment of Rear Admiral Gaouette pending the results of an investigation by the Naval Inspector General. Gaouette's chief of staff, Captain William C. Minter, led the strike group until the arrival of Rear Admiral Troy Shoemaker as Gaouette's replacement. Later it emerged that Gaouette was dismissed for misconduct including '..for misconduct including foul language, flipping off lieutenants, speculation that black admirals were chosen because of their race and sending fellow officers a racially charged email about a black sailor.'

On 6 February 2013, the U.S. Department of Defense announced that the upcoming deployment of the carrier Harry S. Truman and the cruiser Gettysburg would be postponed pending the resolution of the upcoming budget sequestration, leaving Carrier Strike Group 3 as the only U.S. carrier force operating in the Persian Gulf region.

In a March 2013 interview, group commander Rear Admiral Troy Shoemaker noted that the shortfall of U.S. escort ships was being off-set by the assignment of the British destroyer Diamond and the French frigate Chevalier Paul, to operate with the strike group. Two destroyers from Carrier Strike Group 8, the Winston S. Churchill and Farragut, also joined Carrier Strike Group 3 temporarily. In that capacity, on 2 March 2013, the Farragut joined the guided-missile frigate Nicholas is aiding distressed mariners aboard a dhow in the Gulf of Aden. Both Farragut and Churchill left the U.S. Fifth Fleet via the Suez Canal on 8 March 2013. On 1 March 2013, the destroyer William P. Lawrence from Carrier Strike Group Eleven entered the Persian Gulf for operations with the strike group.

On 26 March 2013, the strike group departed the Fifth Fleet. During over five months of operations, Carrier Air Wing Nine had flown a total of more than 9,000 sorties and more than 23,000 flight hours in support of coalition forces in Afghanistan. Also on that date, the carrier Stennis and Carrier Air Wing Nine received the 2012 Ramage Award for carrier/air wing operational excellence during the 2012–2013 deployment.

On 29 April 2013, the carrier Vinson and the cruiser Mobile Bay arrived at Naval Station San Diego, California, ending the 2013 deployment. The strike group had steamed over 66,000 nautical miles (122,000 km; 76,000 mi) and aircraft assigned to Carrier Air Wing Nine had flown 10,000 sorties totaling 30,400 flight hours during the eight-month-long operation.

2012–2013 deployment force composition

| Surface Warships | | Carrier Air Wing Nine (CVW-9) squadrons embarked aboard flagship USS John C. Stennis (CVN-74) | |
|---|---|---|---|
| USS Mobile Bay (CG-53) | HMS Diamond (D34) | Strike Fighter Squadron 192 (VFA-192): 10 F/A-18C | Carrier Airborne Early Warning Squadron 112 (VAW-112): 4 E-2C |
| USS Paul Hamilton (DDG-60) | HMS Daring (D32) | Strike Fighter Squadron 97 (VFA-97): 10 F/A-18C | Fleet Logistics Support Squadron 30 (VRC-30), Det. 4: 2 C-2A |
| USS Farragut (DDG-99) | FS Chevalier Paul (D621) | Strike Fighter Squadron 41 (VFA-41): 12 F/A-18F | Helicopter Sea Combat Squadron 8 (HSC-8): 12 MH-60S |
| USS Winston S. Churchill (DDG-81) | —— | Strike Fighter Squadron 14 (VFA-14): 12 F/A-18E | Helicopter Maritime Strike Squadron 71 (HSM-71): 11 MH-60R |
| USS William P. Lawrence (DDG-110) | —— | Electronic Attack Squadron 133 (VAQ-133): 4 EA-6B | —— |

2012–2013 deployment exercises and port visits

| Number | Regional exercises/operations | | | | Port visits | | Notes |
| Number | Duration | US force | Bilateral/multilateral partners | Operating area | Location | Dates | Notes |
|---|---|---|---|---|---|---|---|
| 1st: | 20 September 2012 | Carrier Strike Group 3 | Valiant Shield 2012: U.S. Pacific Command | Guam operating area | Joint Base Pearl Harbor–Hickam | 31 Aug to 1 September 2012 | |
| 2nd: | —— | Carrier Strike Group 3 | —— | —— | Kota Kinabalu, Malaysia | 30 Sep to 4 October 2012 | |
| 3rd: | 12 October 2012 | Carrier Strike Group 3 | Carrier Strike Group 5 | Andaman Sea | Phuket, Thailand | 7 – 11 October 2012 | |
| 3rd: | 21 Oct to 17 November 2012 | Carrier Strike Group 3 | OEF – Afghanistan: ISAF | North Arabian Sea | Manama, Bahrain | 20 – 24 November 2012 | |
| 4th: | 28 Jan to 19 February 2013 | Mobile Bay | Chevalier Paul | Arabian Sea | Manama, Bahrain | 8 December 2012 | |
| 5th: | —— | Paul Hamilton | —— | —— | Manama, Bahrain | 20 December 2012 | |
| 6th: | —— | John C. Stennis | —— | —— | Jebel Ali, U.A.E. | 23–28 Dec 2012 | |
| 6th: | 15 January 2013 | Carrier Strike Group 3 | PASSEX: HMS Monmouth | North Arabian Sea | Jebel Ali, U.A.E. | 1–5 Feb 2013 | |
| 7th: | —— | Paul Hamilton | —— | —— | Manama, Bahrain | 26 February 2013 | |
| 8th: | —— | John C. Stennis, Mobile Bay | —— | —— | Jebel Ali, Dubai | 13–17 Mar 2013 | |
| 9th: | 4–7 Apr 2013 | Carrier Strike Group 3 | PASSEX (Note: The Royal Navy frigate HMS Monmouth (F235), the French Navy frigate Chevalier Paul (D621), and the Royal Australian Navy frigate HMAS Toowoomba (FFH 156).) | South China Sea | Singapore | 1–3 Apr 2013 | |
| 10th: | 17–18 Apr 2013 | Carrier Strike Group Three | Munitions off-load: Richard E. Byrd | Mid-Pacific Ocean | Naval Station Pearl Harbor | 21–24 Apr 2013 | |

=== 2013–2015 operations and upkeep ===
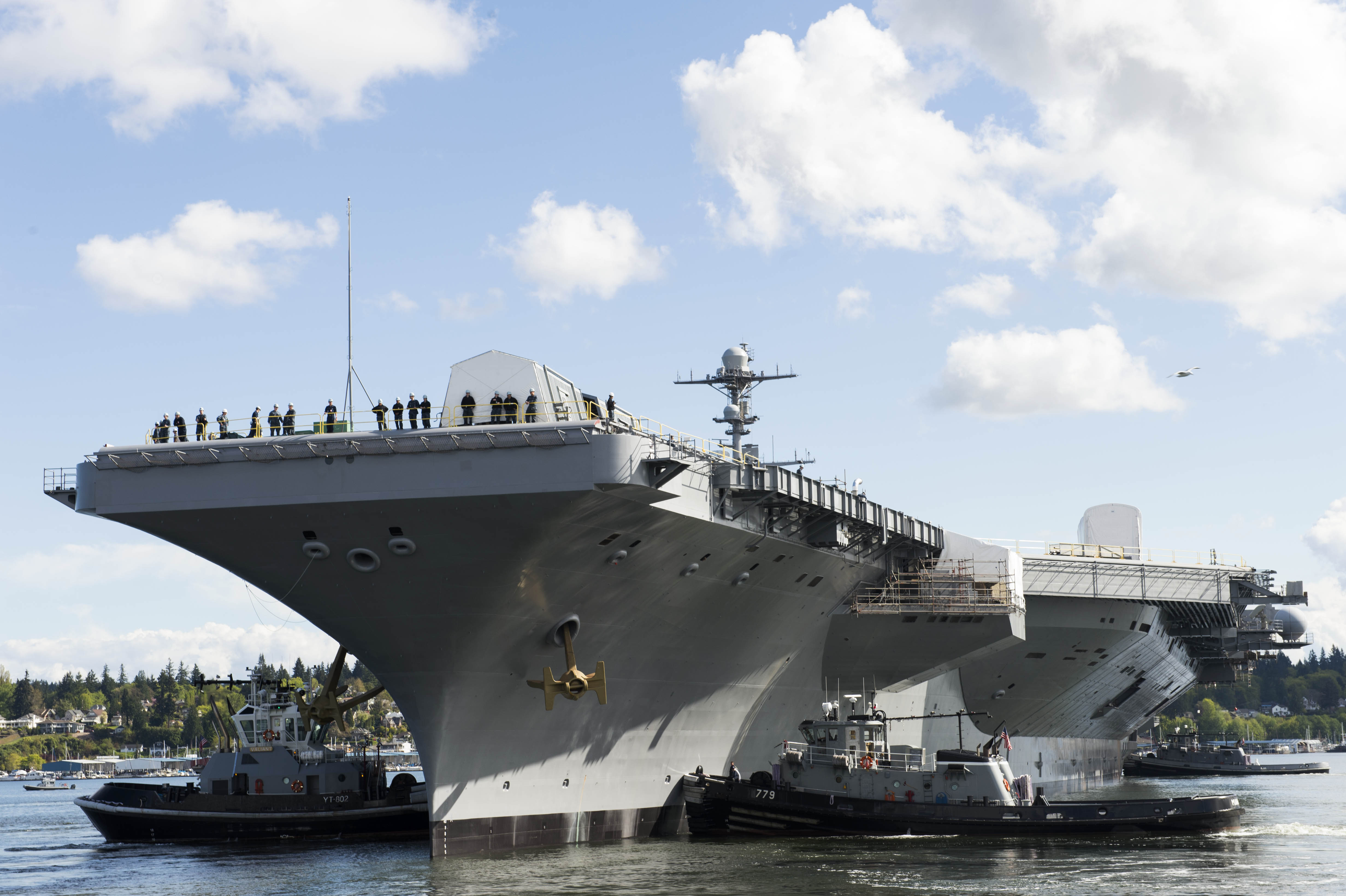
USS John C. Stennis (25 April 2014)

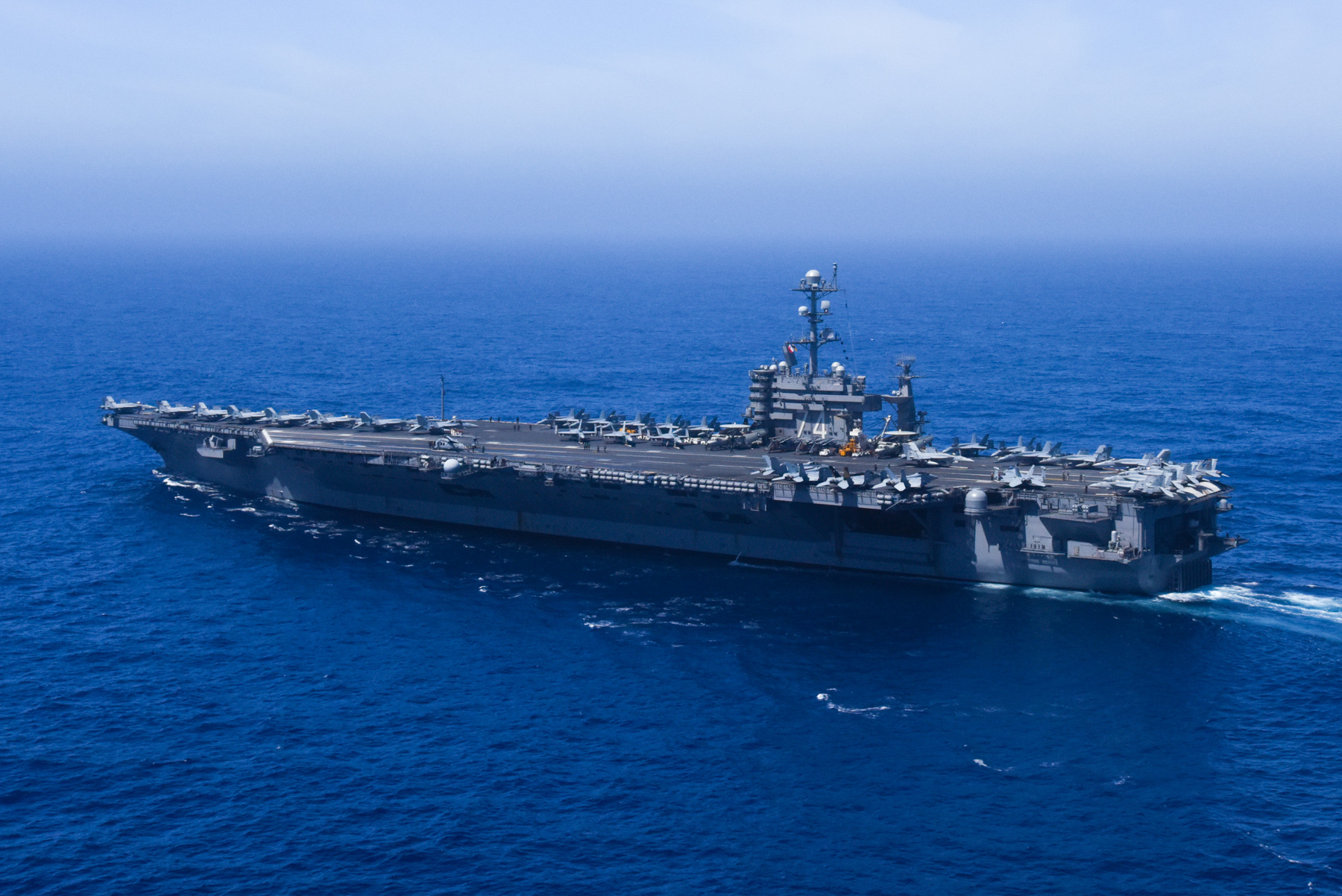
Southern California operations area (30 April 2015)

On 27 June 2013, the carrier John C. Stennis began a scheduled 14-month-long overhaul when it entered drydock at the Puget Sound Naval Shipyard and Intermediate Maintenance Facility at Bremerton, Washington (pictured). On 19 August 2013, the destroyer Milius completed its Extended Drydocking Selected Restricted Availability (E-DSRA) overhaul. On 23 September 2013, the destroyer Wayne E. Meyer completed its Mid-Cycle Inspection (MCI) assessment with the Board of Inspection and Survey.

Between 7–11 October 2013, the cruiser Mobile Bay and destroyer Dewey participated with other U.S. and Canadian warships in a Task Group Exercise (TGEX) maneuvers. Following this exercise, the Mobile Bay began its Selected Restricted Availability (SRA) overhaul at the BAE Systems ship repair facility in San Diego, California, with a completion date of May 2014.

In November 2013, the destroyer Kidd completed its two-week Independent Deployer Certification (IDCERT) exercises. Also, during that month, the Wayne E. Meyer underwent its own IDCERT exercises in the southern California operating area, as well as participating Group Sail maneuvers with Carrier Strike Group Nine, as part of Wayne E. Meyer's work-up for its upcoming 2014 deployment.

On 25 April 2014, John C. Stennis departed drydock, completing its 14-month-long overhaul (pictured). Between 23–28 September 2014, strike group planners held a pre-deployment training planning meeting among the various component commands. It was held at Naval Base Kitsap-Bangor, Washington. Both Stennis and Carrier Air Wing 9 completed their flight deck certification on 11 December 2014. During 13–15 January 2015, Stennis on-loaded over six million pounds 6,000,000 pounds (2,700 t) of munitions at the U.S. Naval Magazine Indian Island, Washington.

On 23 March 2015, John C. Stennis departed Naval Base Kitsap, Washington, for a Tailored Ship's Training Availability (TSTA) and Final Evaluation Period (FEP) exercises in the Southern California operating area (pictured) after a six-week Continuous Maintenance Availability (CMAV). The Stennis subsequently conducted joint training exercise with the U.S. Army helicopters, stationed at Joint Base Lewis-McChord, Washington, while transiting the Strait of Juan de Fuca. On 8 June 2015, the Stennis departed Bremerton, Washington, for Carrier Qualifications (CQ) exercises before paying a port call at Naval Air Station North Island, California, from 12–15 June 2015. The Stennis completed its Composite Training Unit Exercise (COMPTUEX) and Joint Task Force Exercise (JTFEX) training before returning to its home-base on 1 September 2015.

=== 2016 deployment ===
On 15 January 2016, John C. Stennis left Naval Base Kitsap for a scheduled deployment to the Western Pacific. On 20 January 2016, the destroyers USS Stockdale, USS Chung Hoon and USS William P. Lawrence, along with the cruiser USS Mobile Bay and the fast combat support ship USS Rainier, left port, all running off a 'Great Green Fleet' biofuel blend made from tallow, or rendered beef fat, a Navy spokesman told Navy Times. The biofuel mix was 10% biofuel and 90% petroleum. However, the 50-50 goal is still on track, Navy Secretary Ray Mabus told Navy Times in September 2015. The strike group was planned to make a seven-month deployment within the Seventh Fleet area of responsibility.

=== 2026 deployment ===
In 2026, CSG-3 was deployed to the Middle East following the start of the 2026 Iran war.

2026 deployment force composition

| Warships | Carrier Air Wing Nine squadrons embarked aboard USS Abraham Lincoln (CVN-72) | |
|---|---|---|
| USS Frank E. Petersen Jr. (DDG-121) | Strike Fighter Squadron 14: F/A-18E | Electronic Attack Squadron 133: EA-18G |
| USS Spruance (DDG-111) | Strike Fighter Squadron 41: F/A-18F | Helicopter Sea Combat Squadron 14: MH-60S |
| USS Michael Murphy (DDG-112) | Strike Fighter Squadron 151: F/A-18F | Helicopter Maritime Strike Squadron 71: MH-60R |
| —— | Strike Fighter Squadron 314: F-35C | Airborne Command and Control Squadron 117: E-2D |

== Notes ==
Footnotes

Citations

== Sources ==
- Morison, Samuel Loring (September 2014). "U.S. Battle Force Aviation Changes 2013–14". Naval Institute Proceedings. 140 (4): 48–50. ISSN 0041-798X. "Registration required; covers 2013 and 2014."
- —— (May 2009). "U.S. Naval Battle Force Changes 1 January 2008–31 December 2008: Aircraft Carrier Air Wing Assignments and Composition as of 17 Feb 2009". Naval Institute Proceedings. 135 (5): 118–120. ISSN 0041-798X. "Registration required."
- —— (May 2010). "U.S. Naval Battle Force Changes 1 January 2009–31 December 2009: Aircraft Carrier Air Wing Assignments and Composition as of 1 March 2010". Naval Institute Proceedings. 136 (5): 106–116. ISSN 0041-798X. "Registration required."
- —— (May 2011). "U.S. Naval Battle Force Changes 1 January 2010–31 December 2010: Aircraft Carrier Air Wing Assignments and Composition as of 1 March 2011". Naval Institute Proceedings. 137 (5): 117–120. ISSN 0041-798X. "Registration required."
- —— (May 2012). "U.S. Naval Battle Force Changes 1 January 2011–31 December 2011: Aircraft Carrier Air Wing Assignments and Composition as of 2 April 2012". Naval Institute Proceedings. 138 (5): 112. ISSN 0041-798X. "Registration required."
