= HSC-8 =

Helicopter Sea Combat Squadron Eight
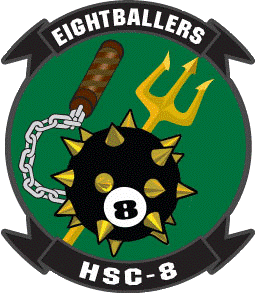
- HSC-8 Emblem
- Active: 1 November 1969 – present
- Country: United States of America
- Branch: United States Navy
- Type: Navy Helicopter Squadron
- Role: Anti-Surface Warfare (ASUW); Combat Search & Rescue (CSAR); Search & Rescue (SAR); Special Operations (SpecOps); Vertical replenishment (VERTREP)
- Part of: CVW-11; Commander, Helicopter Sea Combat Wing Pacific
- Garrison/HQ: NAS North Island
- Nickname: "Eightballers"
- Mottos: 'Ready & Lethal: Victory Follows the Eightball!'
- Colors: Green and Black
- Engagements: Vietnam War; Operation Desert Storm; Operation Enduring Freedom; Operation Iraqi Freedom; Global War on Terror; Operation Prosperity Guardian; Operation Poseidon Archer

Commanders
- Current commander: CDR Dan Thomas

Helicopter Sea Combat Squadron Eight (HSC-8) "Eightballers" is a United States Navy helicopter squadron based at Naval Air Station North Island, San Diego, California. HSC-8 is attached to Carrier Air Wing 11 (CVW-11) and deploys aboard USS Theodore Roosevelt. HSC-8 was redesignated from HS-8 on 28 September 2007.

== Mission ==
Helicopter Sea Combat Squadron Eight (HSC-8), "America's Premier Combat Helicopter Squadron", executes helicopter utility and light attack missions in support of Carrier Air Wing ELEVEN (CVW-11), USS Theodore Roosevelt (CVN-71) and Carrier Strike Group 9 (CSG-9) operations.

== History ==
HSC-8 traces its lineage to the second of two squadrons which bore the designation Helicopter Antisubmarine Squadron EIGHT (HS-8). That Squadron which has become HSC-8 was established on 1 November 1969.

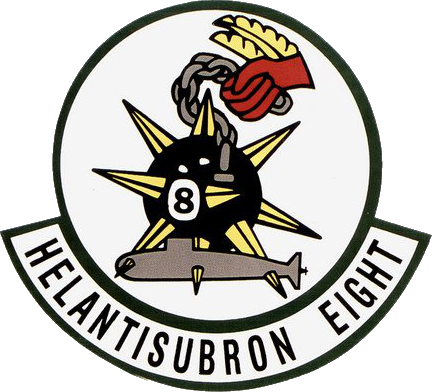
HS-8 squadron insignia

The first squadron designated HS-8 was established at Naval Auxiliary Air Station Ream Field, Imperial Beach, California, on 1 June 1956. The first helicopters employed by the command were the HSS-1N Seabat. In September 1962 in compliance with the 1962 United States Tri-Service aircraft designation system the HSS-1N was redesignated the SH-34J Seabat. At the end of 1962 the squadron transitioned to the SH-3A Sea King. The squadron performed eight Western Pacific (WESTPAC) deployments between 1957 and 1968 including combat tours in Vietnam. Notable achievements included a 1,200 mile medical evacuation (MEDEVAC) made by helicopter, the longest in history. Other squadron achievements included participation in the Apollo 6 space vehicle/crew recovery and performing more than 30 Combat Search and Rescue missions in North Vietnam. The squadron was disestablished in December 1968.

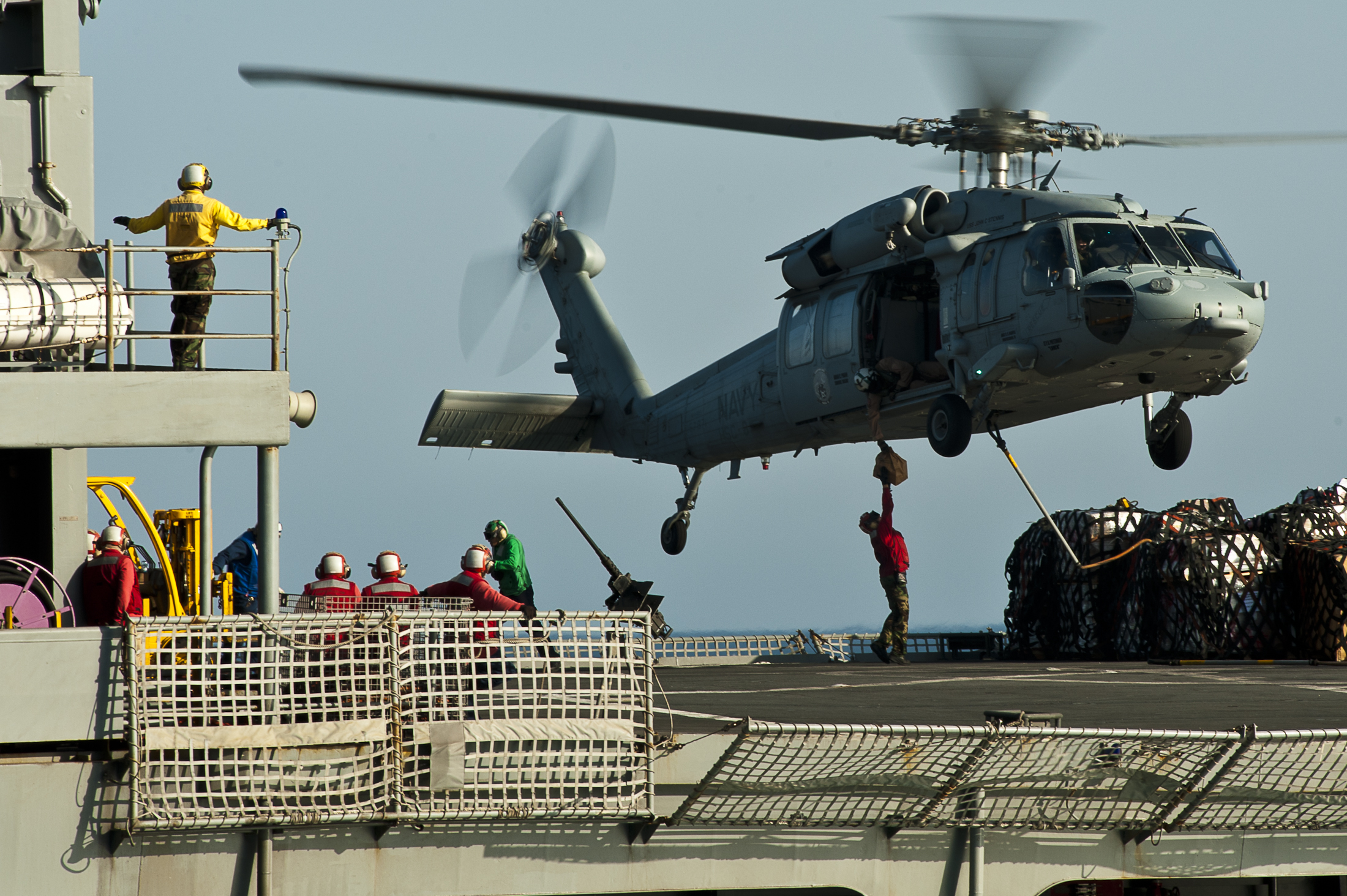
An MH-60S Seahawk Helicopter conducts VERTREP Operations

A year later on 1 November 1969, a new squadron was established and designated HS-8. Although the two squadrons are separate squadrons and the lineage of the first does not transfer to the second, the newly established squadron adopted the former squadron's name, insignia and traditions in its honor. With the new squadron came new helicopters, namely the SH-3D Sea King. Notable achievements during the next decade included site surveys for the U.S. Atomic Energy Commission, a study of blue whale migration patterns, supporting President Richard Nixon during his working vacation aboard USS New Orleans and deploying in response to the Iranian hostage crisis. In 1975 the squadron transitioned to the SH-3H Sea King. In 1976 the American Bicentennial Committee honored HS-8 as a bicentennial command. The squadron's 19th deployment came in response to Desert Shield/Desert Storm in December 1990. This deployment was the last for HS-8 in the SH-3.

On 2 April 1993 HS-8 completed transition from the SH-3H into the new SH-60F and HH-60H Seahawk helicopters. The squadron's 20th WESTPAC deployment was from February to August 1994. HS-8 was a member of Carrier Air Wing 14 (CVW-14) aboard USS Carl Vinson. The 21st WESTPAC was concluded in May 1996 followed in September 1997 by an "Around the World Cruise" with USS Nimitz. Deployments after this were routine until 11 September 2001.

From November 2001 to May 2002 HS-8 and Carrier Air Wing Nine deployed in Operation Enduring Freedom. There they played a vital role in the campaign that ended with the removal of the Taliban government in Afghanistan.

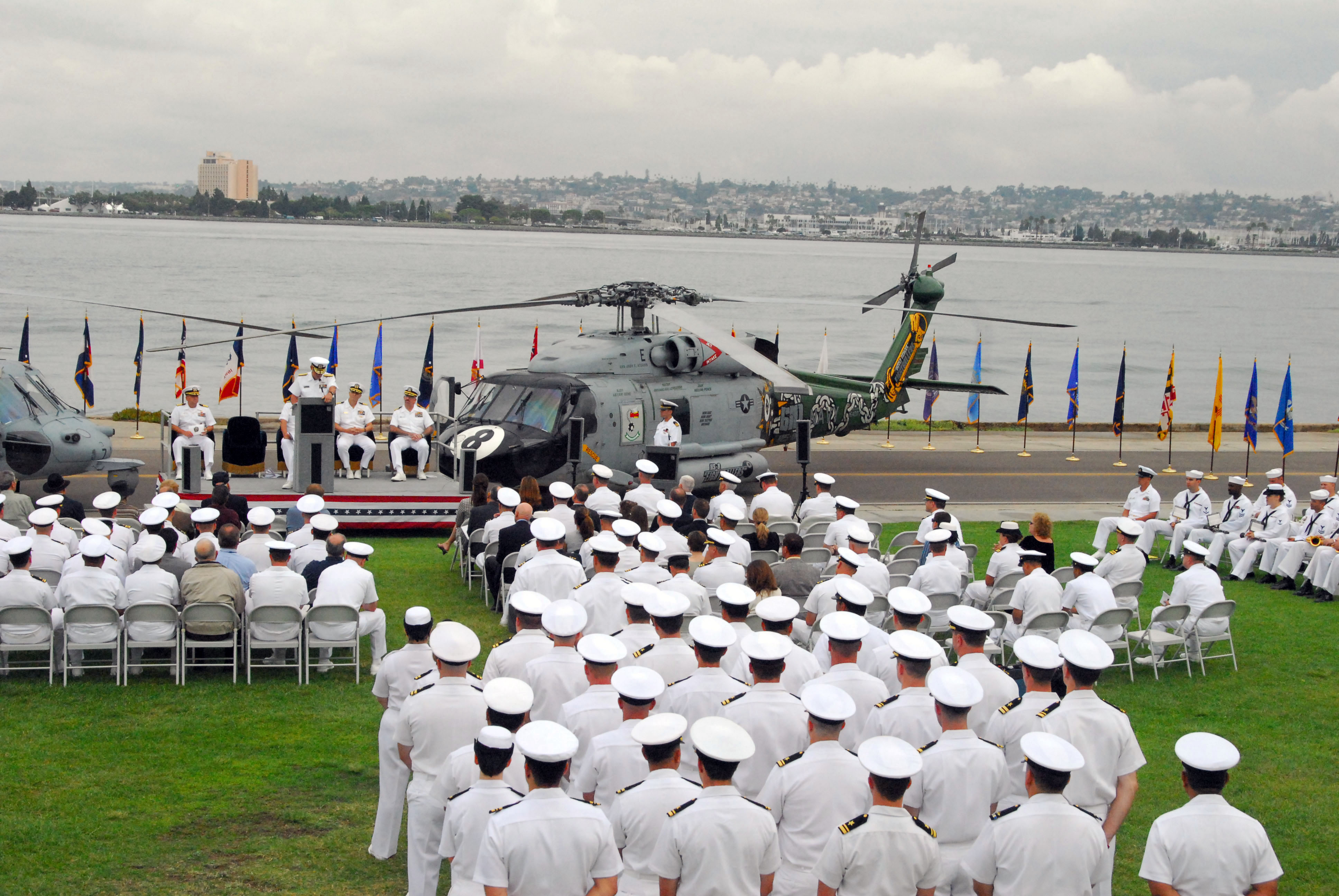
HSC-8 redesignation ceremony 28 September 2007.

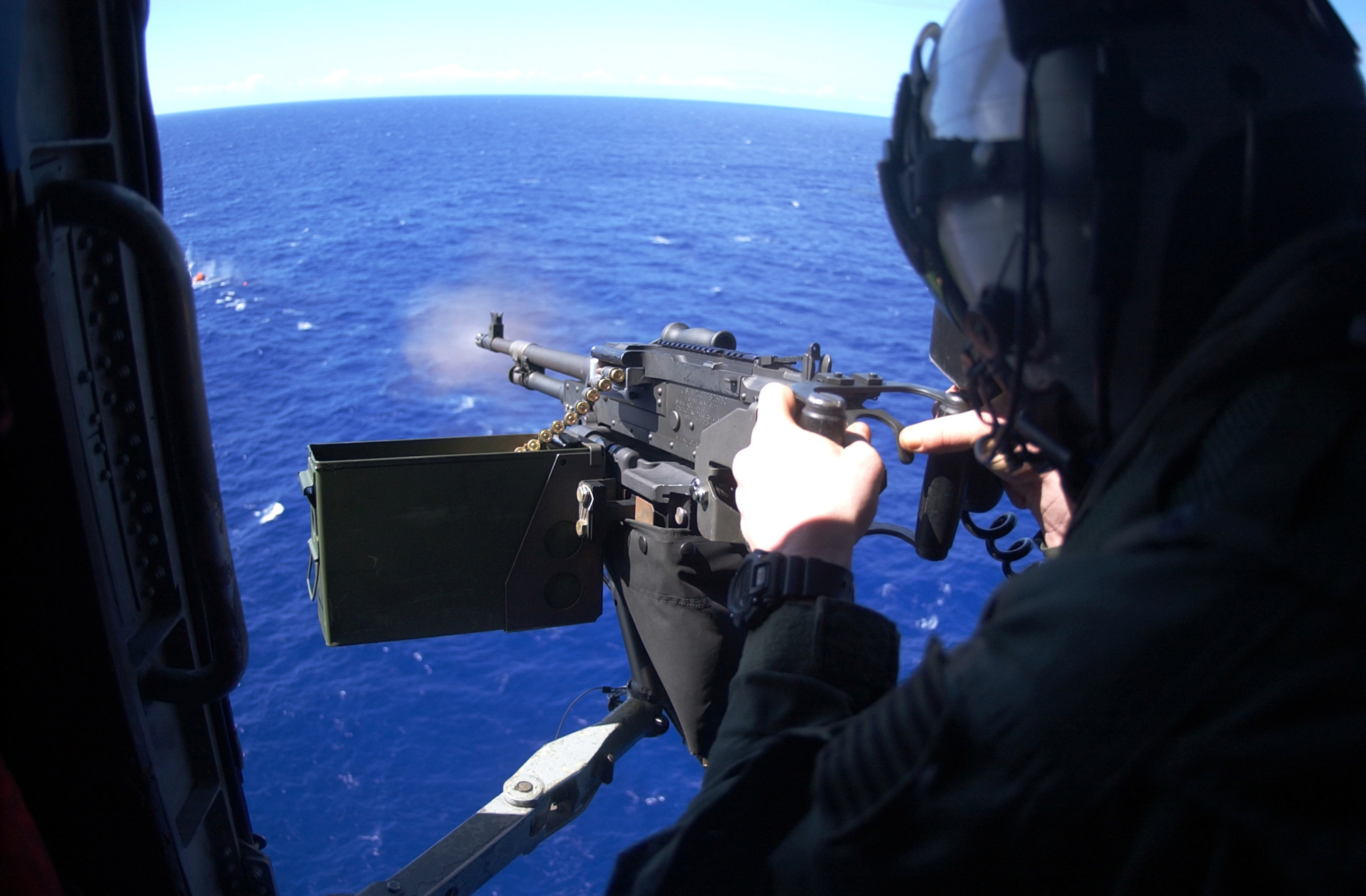
M240 machine gun is fired from a SH-60F Sea Hawk assigned to the "Eightballers" of Helicopter Anti-Submarine Squadron Eight (HS-8) during a training exercise. 2003

HS-8 made another WESTPAC deployment from January to September 2003 followed by their second "Around the World Cruise" from January to August 2005 aboard USS Carl Vinson. The squadron earned the Carrier Air Wing Nine Golden Wrench Award for superior maintenance and mission completion percentages as well as the Battle E Device (Navy Battle Efficiency Award) for the 2005 World Cruise. In early December 2005 an HS-8 helicopter and aircrew participated in filming a portion of the television show 24 where the helicopter was transporting the fictitious Russian president and his wife to the American presidents ranch.

On 28 September 2007, at Naval Air Station North Island, Helicopter Antisubmarine Squadron Eight was redesignated as Helicopter Sea Combat Squadron Eight and received its first MH-60S Seahawk with the armed helo kit. In January 2009, HSC-8 went on its first deployment with the MH-60S where it was joined by HSM-71 flying the MH-60R Seahawk aboard USS John C. Stennis. During this deployment, HSC-8 assisted in the filming of Transformers: Revenge of the Fallen.

Starting the first of two back-to-back eight-month deployment cycles, HSC-8 embarked on a WESTPAC deployment in July 2011. During deployment, the Eightballers accomplished the first-ever MH-60S Cruiser/Destroyer (CRUDES) detachment when they embarked in USS Mobile Bay. HSC-8 also assisted in counter piracy operations, successfully aiding in the capture of fifteen suspected pirates.

After a short turn around, HSC-8 departed on an eight-month surge deployment to the 5th Fleet Area of Responsibility in September 2012. HSC-8 deployed as part of Carrier Air Wing NINE (CVW-9) aboard USS John C. Stennis in support of Operation Enduring Freedom, maritime security operations, and theater security exercises. One of the highlights of the deployment was the rescue of a drowning man in the Straits of Malacca- the Eightballer’s first overwater rescue in several years. HSC-8 also participated in Operation Beacon Flash, a joint security exercise with the Royal Omani Air Force.

== Squadron aircraft ==
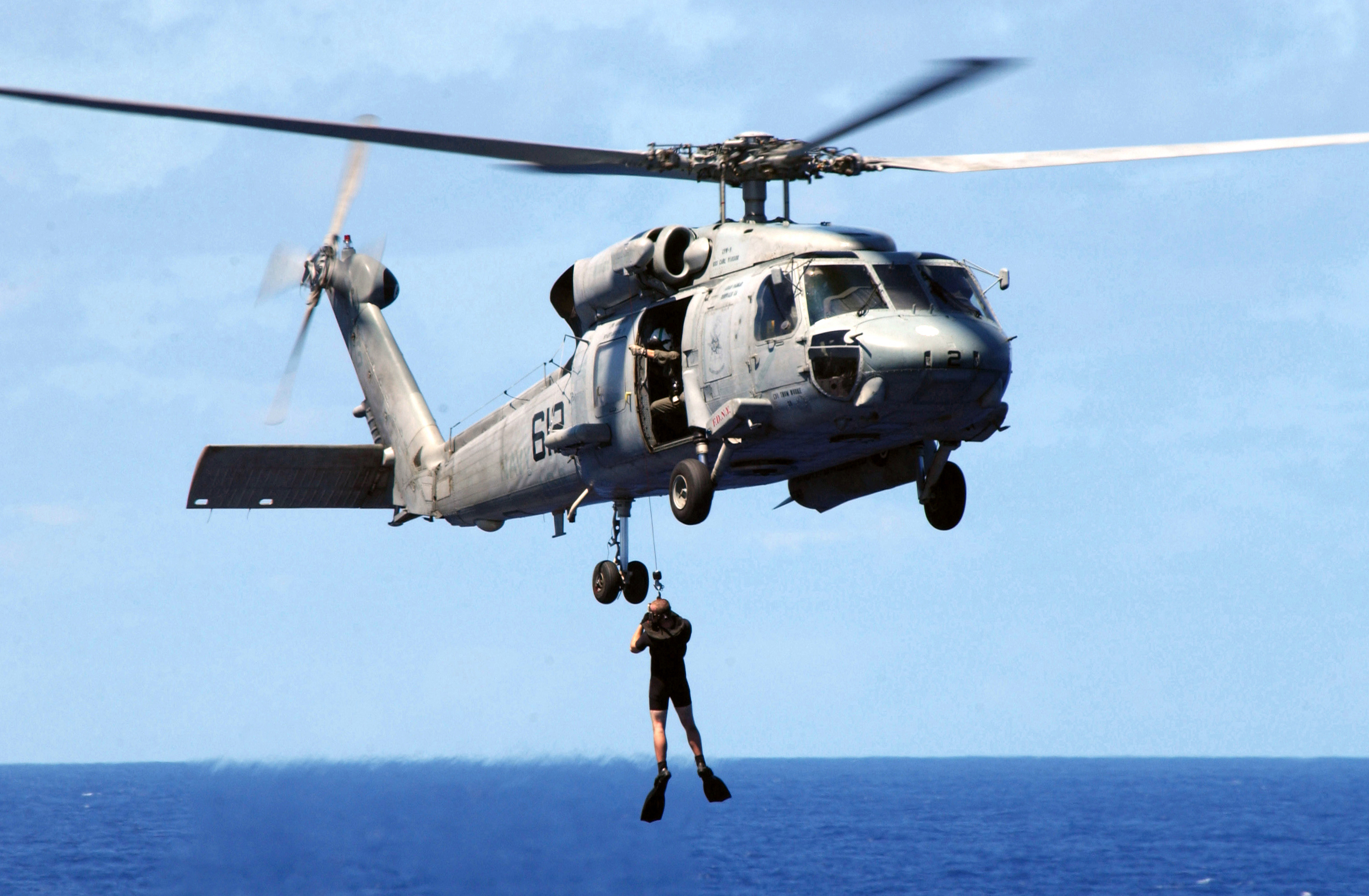
A rescue swimmer is lifted up to an HS-8 SH-60F.

First squadron designated HS-8 (1 June 1956 to 31 Dec 1968)

- HSS-1N Seabat, (redesignated SH-34J in 1962): 1956–1962
- SH-3A Sea King, 1962–1968 (squadron disestablished)

Second squadron designated HS-8/HSC-8 (1 Nov 1969 to present)

- SH-3D Sea King, 1969–1975
- SH-3H Sea King, 1975–1992
- SH-60F Seahawk, 1992–2007
- SH-60H Seahawk, 1992–2007
- MH-60S Seahawk, 2007–present (redesignated HSC-8 in 2007)

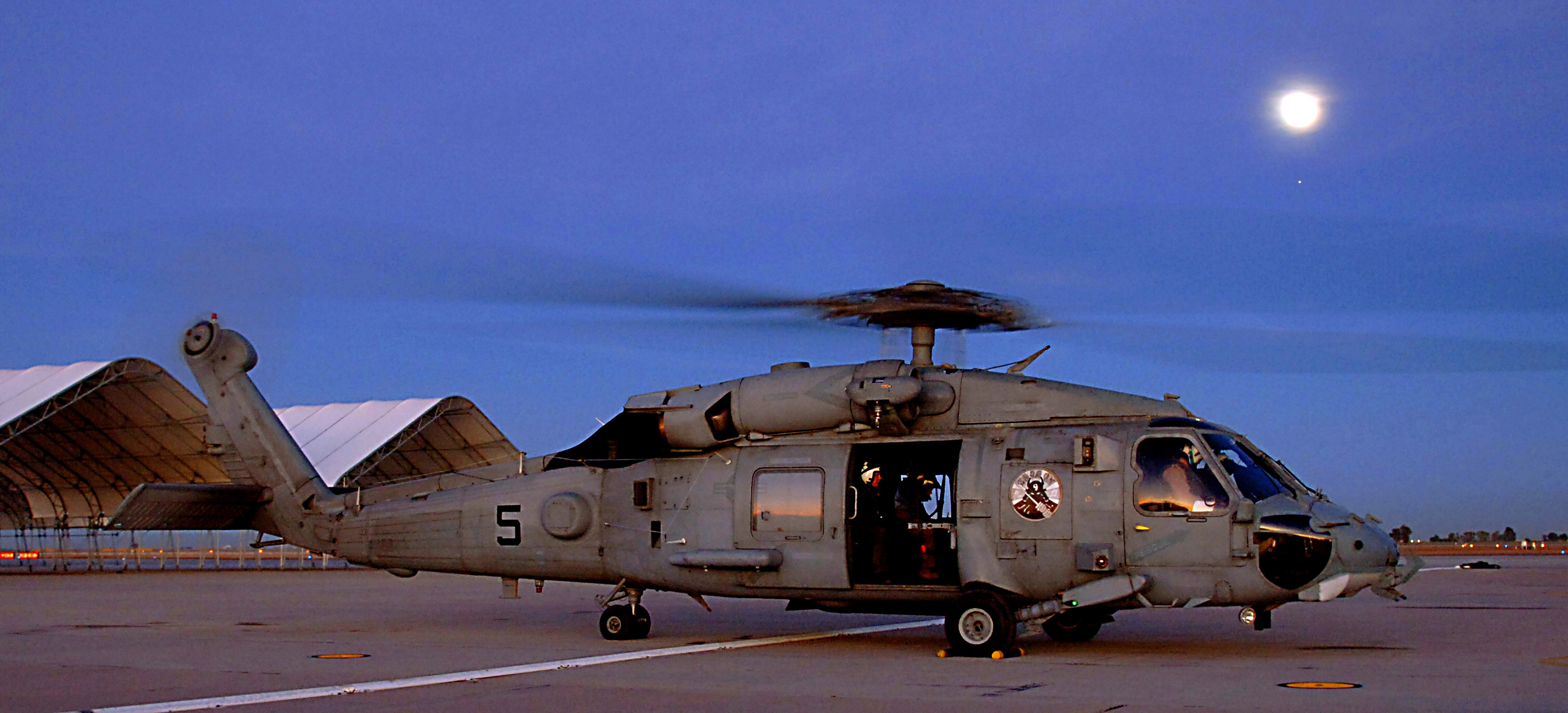
An HH-60H assigned to HS-8 prepares to taxi at NAF El Centro, CA.

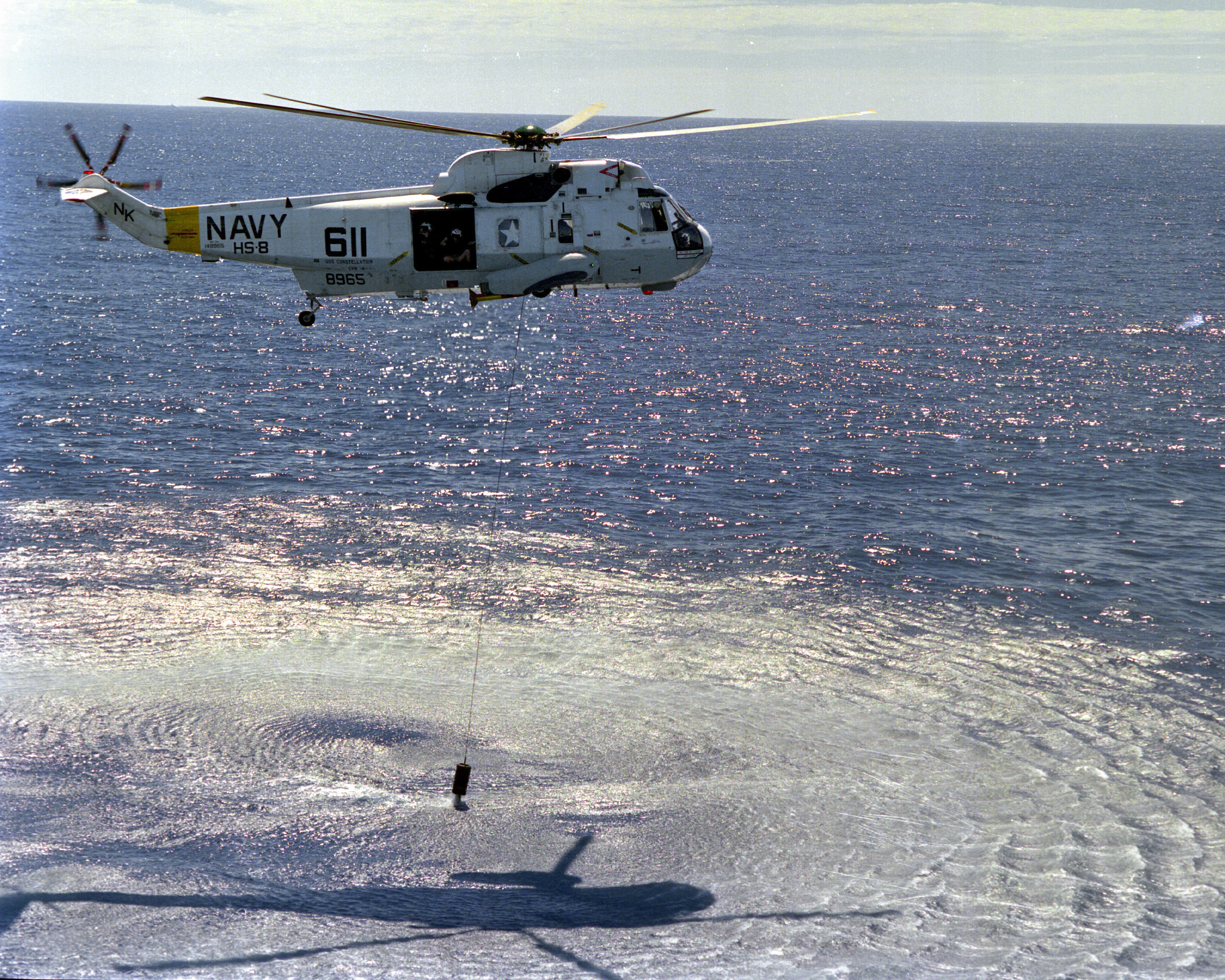
An SH-3H of HS-8 dipping its sonar in 1989

== Squadron awards ==
- National Bicentennial Command
  - 1976
- Navy Unit Commendation
  - 1990
- Meritorious Unit Commendation
  - 1985
  - 1987
  - 1996
  - 2003
- Battle E Device (Navy Battle Efficiency Award)
  - 1980
  - 1983
  - 1986
  - 1995
  - 2005
  - 2009
  - 2012
  - 2017
- Captain Arnold Jay Isbell Trophy for Antisubmarine Warfare Excellence
  - Eight Awards
  - 2006
- Admiral Jimmy Thach Award for Best Carrier Antisubmarine Warfare Squadron in the Navy
  - Five Awards
  - 2006
- Top Torpedo Award for Antisubmarine Warfare Excellence
  - 1982
  - 1983
  - 1984
  - 1991
  - 1992
- Sikorsky Superior Maintenance Award
  - 1983
  - 1984
  - 1985
  - 2003
  - 2012
- Navy Golden Anchor Award
  - 1991
  - 1997
  - 2016
  - 2017
- Chief of Naval Operations Safety Award
  - 1983
  - 1985
  - 1986
  - 1990
  - 1994
  - 2002 "for 22 years and 72,000 flight hours without a Class 'A' mishap."
  - 2012
- Naval Air Forces Medical Readiness Award
  - 2012
  - 2016
  - 2017

== Ships deployed aboard ==
- USS Princeton 1958–1968
- USS Hornet 1958–1968
- USS Bennington 1960–1974
- USS Ticonderoga
- USS New Orleans 1970
- USS Kitty Hawk
- USS Ranger 1983–1984
- USS Constellation 1984–1990
- USS Independence 1990–1993
- USS Nimitz 1995–2000, 2013-2017
- USS Carl Vinson 1993–1994, 2003–2005
- USS John C. Stennis 2000–2003, 2006–2015
- USS Mobile Bay 2011–2012
- USNS Bridge 2012–2013
- USS Theodore Roosevelt 2019-current

== See also ==
- History of the United States Navy
- Helicopter Squadrons
- CVW-11
