= Kevin M. Quinn =

United States admiral

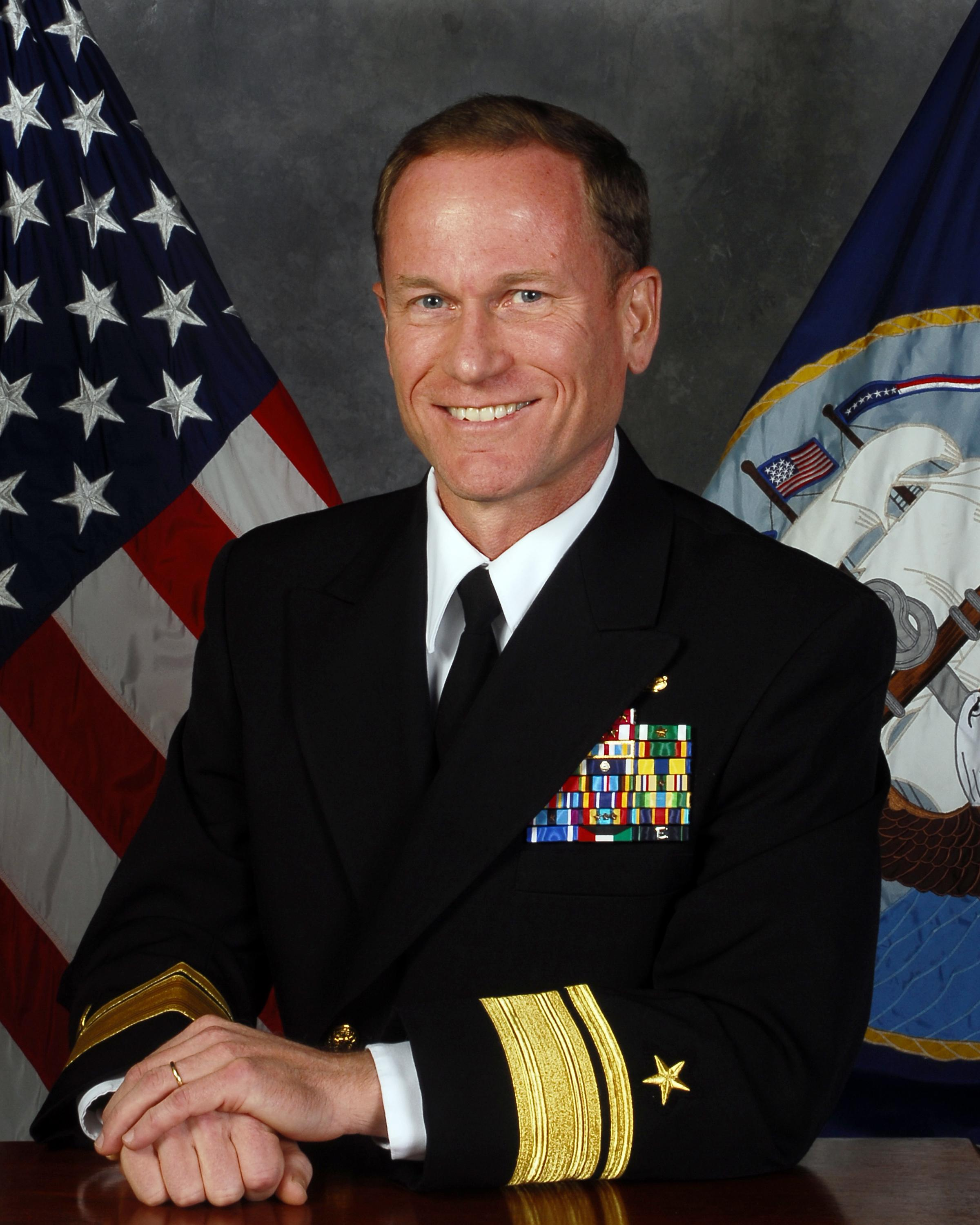
- Born: 1955 (age 70–71)
- Education: United States Naval Academy; Postgraduate School alumni
- Military career
- Rank: Rear Admiral
- Conflicts: War in Afghanistan; Iraq War

Kevin Michael Quinn (born 1955) is a retired rear admiral of the United States Navy.

== Career ==
Quinn graduated from the United States Naval Academy in 1977. He later earned a master's degree in information science from the Naval Postgraduate School. His early assignment included tours of duty aboard the USS Racine (LST-1191), USS O'Brien (DD-975) and USS Chandler (DDG-996).

He was later named executive officer of the USS Lake Champlain (CG-57) before being given command of the USS Barry (DDG-52) in 1995. While in command, the Barry would be awarded the Battenberg Cup and the Golden Anchor Award. In 2000, he became a destroyer squadron commander and was deployed to the Mediterranean Sea.

Quinn was named Task Force 73/Commander, Logistics Group Western Pacific in 2003. He would lead the Navy's logistics efforts to support Asia in the aftermath of the 2004 Indian Ocean earthquake and tsunami. This included overseeing the efforts of the USNS Mercy (T-AH-19) Task Group.

In 2005, Quinn assumed command of Carrier Strike Group Three. He led the group in the Iraq War and the War in Afghanistan before being named Commander, Naval Surface Force Atlantic in 2008.

Awards he has received include the Navy Distinguished Service Medal, the Legion of Merit with silver award star, the Defense Meritorious Service Medal, the Meritorious Service Medal with two award stars, the Navy Commendation Medal with award star and the Navy Achievement Medal.
