= VAW-112 =

Inactive United States Navy squadron

Carrier Airborne Early Warning Squadron ONE ONE TWO
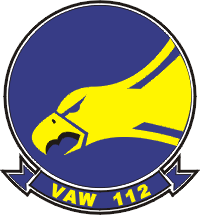
- Carrier Airborne Early Warning Squadron 112 (US Navy) insignia
- Active: 20 April 1967 – May 1970; 3 July 1973 – 31 May 2017
- Country: United States of America
- Branch: United States Navy
- Type: Airborne Early Warning
- Size: 150+
- Part of: Carrier Air Wing 9
- Garrison/HQ: Naval Air Station Point Mugu
- Nickname: The Golden Hawks
- Engagements: Vietnam War; Operation Southern Watch; Operation Enduring Freedom; Operation Iraqi Freedom

Commanders
- Notable commanders: CDR Paul Flores

Aircraft flown
- Electronic warfare: E-2 Hawkeye

Carrier Airborne Early Warning Squadron 112 (VAW-112) is an inactive United States Navy squadron. It was nicknamed the "Golden Hawks". VAW-112 flew the E-2C Hawkeye out of NAS Point Mugu and last deployed in 2013 as part of Carrier Air Wing 9 (CVW-9) on board USS John C. Stennis.

== Squadron History ==
=== 1960s – 1980s ===
The squadron was established 20 April 1967 and assigned to CVW-9. The squadron made three combat deployments operating the E-2A Hawkeye in the Western Pacific in support of the Vietnam War aboard USS Enterprise.

In May 1970, the squadron was temporarily disestablished and placed in "stand down" status until reactivated on 3 July 1973. The squadron, now flying E-2Bs, were assigned to Carrier Air Wing 2 (CVW-2) and made three Western Pacific/Indian Ocean deployments on board USS Ranger, before assignment to Carrier Air Wing 8 (CVW-8) aboard USS Nimitz, for a Mediterranean and Indian Ocean deployment.

In May 1979, the squadron transitioned to the E-2C and again became part of CVW-9 in February 1981. As part of CVW-9, VAW-112 made three Western Pacific/Indian Ocean deployments on board USS Constellation, USS Ranger and USS Kitty Hawk. During this period, VAW-112 was awarded the Battle Efficiency (Battle "E") award for 1979 and 1985. During 1989, VAW-112 deployed aboard USS Nimitz for NORPAC '89, and in August 1989, they became the first West Coast squadron to transition to the E-2C Plus aircraft.

=== 1990s ===
In February and March 1990, VAW-112 deployed aboard USS Constellation for an "Around the Horn" of South America to Norfolk, Virginia cruise. Then in September 1990, the squadron deployed to Howard Air Force Base, Panama for a Joint Task Force 4 counter-narcotics operation. The squadron finished the year and entered 1991 with the CVW-9 workup schedule on board USS Nimitz.

In March 1991, the squadron departed for the Western Pacific, Indian Ocean, Northern Persian Gulf cruise in support of Operation Desert Storm aboard USS Nimitz. In December 1991, VAW-112 deployed again to Howard Air Force Base for another Joint Task Force Four counter-narcotics operation. The squadron participated in joint and combined exercises in 1992 including Roving Sands in May 1992.

In February 1993, VAW-112 deployed aboard USS Nimitz to the Persian Gulf in support of Operation Southern Watch, flying more than 1,000 hours. Upon returning, VAW-112 transitioned to the E-2C Plus Group II. In November 1993, VAW-112 deployed to NS Guantanamo Bay. In 1994 VAW-112 made numerous detachments while the Nimitz was in dry dock. These included Red Air and Red Flag exercises during February; JADO/JEZ trials in March; Roving Sands and Maple Flag at CFB Cold Lake, Canada in June; and another Joint Task Force Four counter-narcotics operation detachment in August. Following a work-up cycle in 1995, the squadron departed San Diego for the Persian Gulf aboard USS Nimitz in December.

After remaining on station for three months, VAW-112 departed the Persian Gulf to deploy off the coast of Taiwan during the Third Taiwan Strait Crisis. After returning home in May, the squadron then headed for Puerto Rico in mid-July for counter-narcotics operations at NS Roosevelt Roads.

During a 1997 work-up cycle for an "Around the World" deployment in late July, the squadron participated in a Pacific Fleet Surge Exercise. The squadron provided battlespace command and control to the battle group for more than 96 continuous hours. During this time VAW-112 surpassed a safety milestone – 27 years and more than 57,000 mishaps-free flight hours. They departed San Diego in September 1997 on another "Around the World" deployment. In 1997, the squadron were presented the Battle "E", the CNO Safety "S" Award, and the coveted Airborne Early Warning Excellence Award. The squadron deployed in July 1998 for a short detachment to Hawaii aboard USS Kitty Hawk and later transferred the newest E-2C Plus Group II Navigation Upgrade aircraft to VAW-115 home based at Naval Air Facility Atsugi, Japan.

The squadron moved from NAS Miramar to NAS Point Mugu in July 1998.

=== 2000s ===
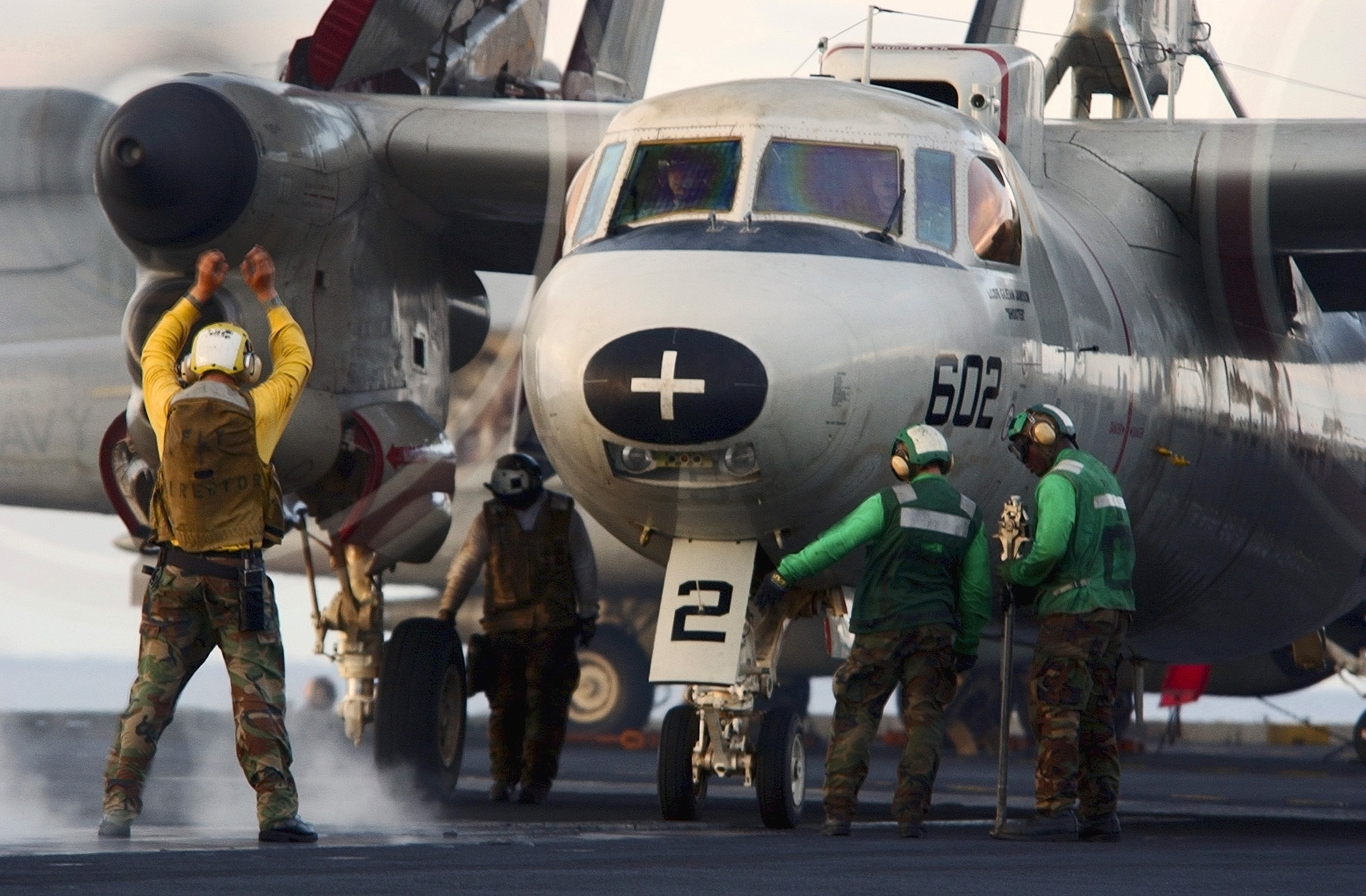
A VAW-112 E-2C is prepared for launch from USS Carl Vinson in the South China Sea

Following a work-up period in 1999, the Golden Hawks deployed aboard USS John C. Stennis in January 2000 for a Western Pacific/Indian Ocean cruise that included flight operations in support of Operation Southern Watch over Iraq. The squadron wrapped up 2000 with counter-narcotics operations in Puerto Rico in September and a carrier qualification detachment to Mazatlán, Mexico in December.

In 2001, the squadron executed several aircraft control detachments including detachments to NAS Key West; NS Norfolk and NAS Fallon. While still continuing their workup cycle leading to a 2002 deployment, the squadron also participated in Fleet Battle Experiment India, providing air control services to the battle group participating in the highest profile Navy exercise in many years. After the September 11 attacks the squadron stood alerts and flew combat missions for the air defense of the entire western coast of the U.S. in support of Operation Noble Eagle.

Immediately following their actions in Operation Noble Eagle, the squadron left for Air Wing Fallon in Fallon, Nevada. The squadron finished an accelerated training schedule and deployed two months early in mid-November 2001 along with the rest of CVW-9 aboard USS John C. Stennis. After an expedited transit across the Pacific the squadron commenced combat operations over Afghanistan in mid-December. The squadron accumulated over 2,095 hours, 500 sorties, and logging 666 arrested landings in support of Operation Enduring Freedom. The squadron returned home to NAS Point Mugu at the end of May, 2002.

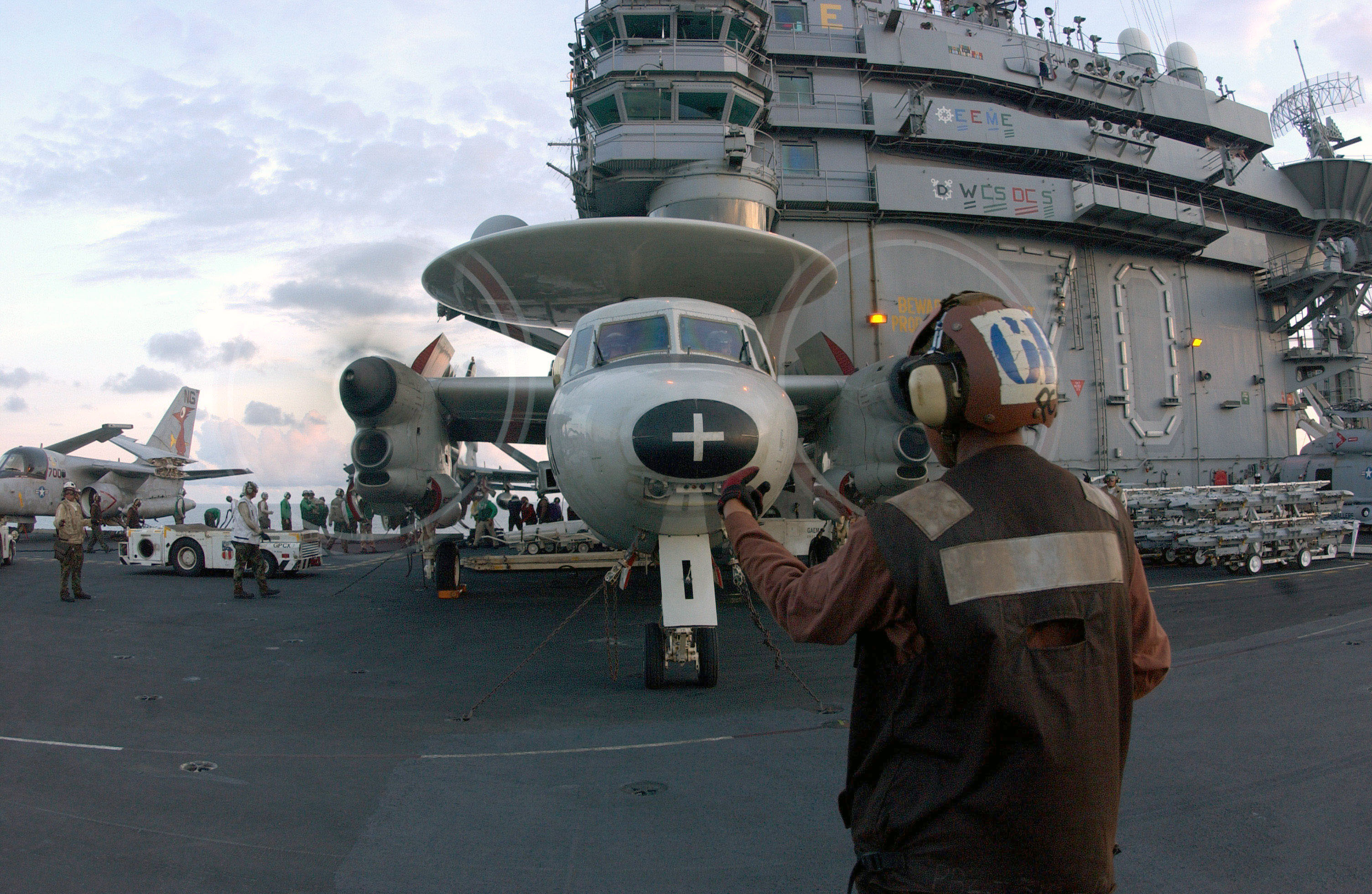
A VAW-112 E-2C is readied for takeoff

Upon returning home, VAW-112 completed training to transition to the Mission Computer Upgrade and Advanced Controller-Indicator Set (MCU/ACIS) Navigation Upgrade version of the E-2C Plus. This new version of the Hawkeye featured new display scopes and interfaces for aircraft controllers and mission commanders, along with a new, more powerful mission computer. In addition, the aircraft's navigation system is significantly more reliable.

In October 2002, the squadron commenced an unannounced, compressed inter-deployment turnaround cycle and left for NAS Fallon, Nevada to complete both Strike Fighter Advance Readiness Program (SFARP) and Air Wing 9 Fallon Det in a record span of three weeks. The squadron returned home for three weeks and readied themselves for COMPTUEX PLUS on board USS Carl Vinson. In January 2003 the squadron deployed to the Western Pacific on board USS Carl Vinson, seven months ahead of schedule. During the WestPac 2003 cruise USS Carl Vinson visited Hawaii, Guam, Pusan, South Korea, Japan, Singapore, Perth, and Hong Kong. When CVW-9 returned home in November 2003, it had been deployed, embarked, or detached for twenty-one of the previous twenty-seven months making the air wing the most deployed Naval Aviation unit since the 11 September attacks.

In January 2004, the squadron departed once more on USS Carl Vinson for a three-week Tailored Ships Training Availability (TSTA) exercise. This was repeated again in June 2004 and served as the beginning of the next workup cycle in preparation for deploying in support of Operation Iraqi Freedom (OIF). Following TSTA the squadron again detached to NAS Fallon, Nevada on two different occasions – first for three weeks to complete SFARP and again two months later for Air Wing Fallon for four weeks. The workup cycle also included a three-week return to USS Carl Vinson for the carrier's Composite Training Unit Exercise (COMPTUEX) which brought the entire strike group together into one cohesive fighting unit in preparation for actual combat operations.

In January 2005, VAW-112 prepared for an "Around the World" deployment on board USS Carl Vinson and after a three-week Joint Task Force Exercise (JTFEX), headed west in support of OIF. After port calls in Guam and Singapore, USS Carl Vinson and CVW-9 arrived in the Persian Gulf where VAW-112 immediately began flying missions over Iraq. The squadron served as an airborne battlefield communications relay for the troops and convoys in country. VAW-112 carried out over 480 sorties, accumulating nearly 1,500 hours with a 98 percent sortie completion rate.

The squadron returned from their deployment in August 2005 and VAW-112 and CVW-9 transferred to USS John C. Stennis as USS Carl Vinson entered a complex overhaul cycle at Newport News, Virginia. In November 2005, the squadron became the first squadron on the West Coast to incorporate the NP2000 eight blade modification for its propellers. In April 2006 the squadron began work-ups for their scheduled 2007 deployment. Beginning with the Hawkeye Advance Readiness Program (HARP) in preparation for that May's Strike Fighter Advance Readiness Program (SFARP), at NAS Fallon. The squadron returned to sea that June on board USS John C. Stennis for Tailored Ships Training Availability (TSTA). The squadron returned to NAS Fallon in August to complete Air Wing Fallon. In September 2006, the squadron modified their aircraft to incorporate both the Automatic Identification System (AIS) and Intra Battle Group Wireless Network (IBGWN), which they first employed during COMPTUEX. Following CSG-3's Joint Task Force Exercise (JTFEX), the squadron returned to NAS Point Mugu for the holidays and prepared for their upcoming January deployment.

In January, 2007, VAW-112 again deployed in support of Operation Iraqi Freedom and Operation Enduring Freedom. The squadron served as an airborne battlefield communications platform coordinating close air support and tanking missions. VAW-112 carried out over 950 sorties, accumulating over 1,800 hours with a 98 percent sortie completion rate. After five months in the Northern Arabian Sea and Persian Gulf, the squadron returned to NAS Point Mugu ending a seven-month deployment. For their efforts in the air and on the ground, VAW-112 was awarded the Battle Efficiency Award or ‘Battle E’ from Commander, Naval Air Forces, U.S. Pacific Fleet.

Upon return from deployment, VAW-112 received four new Hawkeye 2000 aircraft. This platform incorporates new electronic and flight systems increasing the Golden Hawk's ability to provide accurate and timely airborne command and control.

=== 2010s ===
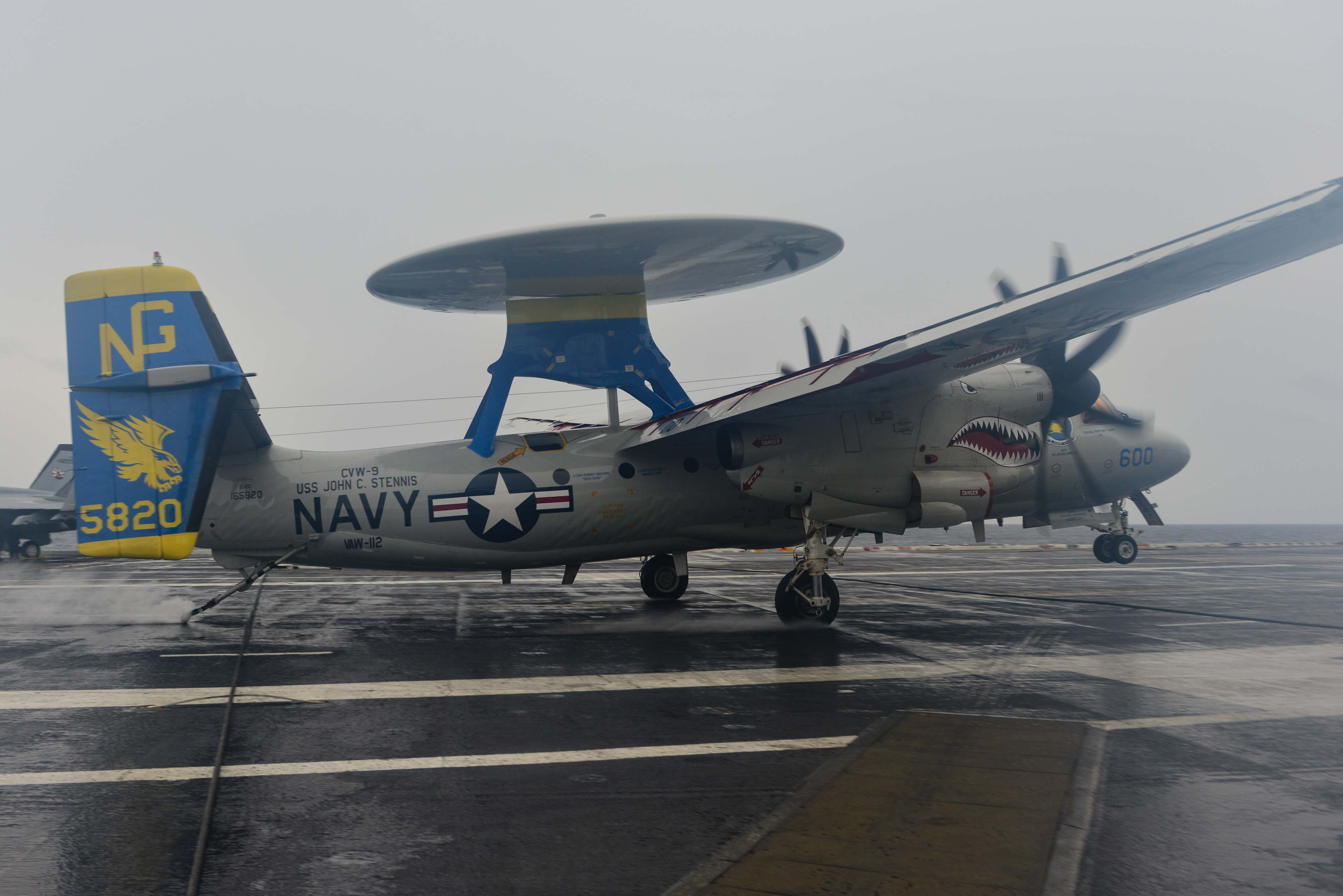
VAW-112 E-2C landing aboard USS John C. Stennis in December 2014

On 18 December 2011, the final command and control mission for U.S. forces over Iraq was flown by a squadron E-2C Hawkeye, operating from USS John C. Stennis effectively ending U.S. naval support for Operation New Dawn.

After returning from cruise, the squadron was informed that as part of the surge carrier, they would begin a condensed work-up cycle for an eight-month deployment, again in support of Operation Enduring Freedom. After two weeks of Air Wing Fallon and two weeks of Sustainment Exercise (SUSTEX), VAW-112 set sail in September 2012. After supporting OEF and Operation Spartan Shield, the squadron returned in May 2013.

Since May 2013 all VAW-112 aircraft have undergone a transition to the Communications, Navigation, Surveillance/Air Traffic Management (CNS/ATM) system, in addition to a weapons system software upgrade.

In February 2016, it was reported that it was planned to deactivate VAW-112 in FY 2017. The squadron was deactivated on 31 May 2017.

== See also ==
- History of the United States Navy
- List of United States Navy aircraft squadrons
