= HSM-71 =

Helicopter Maritime Strike Squadron Seven One
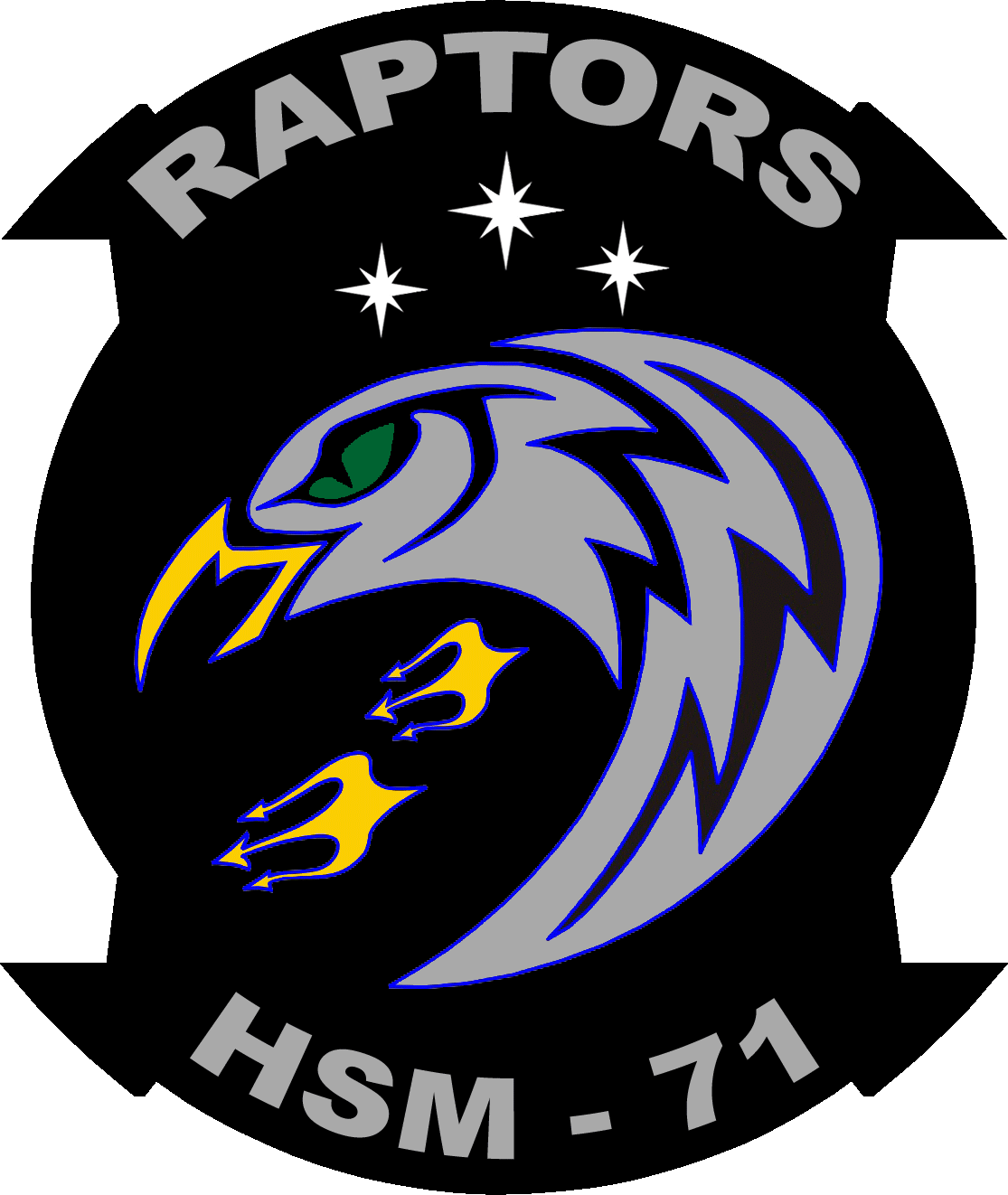
- HSM-71 insignia
- Active: 4 October 2007 - present
- Country: United States of America
- Branch: United States Navy
- Role: Anti-Surface Warfare (ASUW); Under-Sea Warfare (USW); Search & Rescue (SAR)
- Part of: Carrier Air Wing 9
- Garrison/HQ: Naval Air Station North Island
- Nickname: "Raptors"
- Mottos: "The First and the Finest"
- Engagements: Operation Prosperity Guardian; Operation Poseidon Archer; Operation Epic Fury

Commanders
- Current commander: CDR Jessica L. Phenning

Helicopter Maritime Strike Squadron Seven One (HSM-71), nicknamed the Raptors, is a United States Navy helicopter squadron based at Naval Air Station North Island in San Diego, California. The squadron is assigned to Carrier Air Wing 9 (CVW-9).

HSM-71 was established on 4 October 2007 as the United States Navy's first MH-60R Seahawk squadron. The squadron operates the MH-60R Seahawk and conducts anti-submarine warfare, surface warfare, electronic warfare, and search-and-rescue missions.

The squadron received its first Battle Efficiency Award ("Battle E") in 2009 and was awarded the Captain Arnold Jay Isbell Trophy for excellence in anti-submarine warfare in both 2009 and 2010.

== History ==
HSM-71 was established on 4 October 2007 as the United States Navy's first MH-60R Seahawk squadron. The squadron adopted the motto "First and Finest" and was formed as part of the Navy's transition to the MH-60R Seahawk maritime strike helicopter.

In 2009, the squadron received its first Battle Efficiency Award ("Battle E"). It was also awarded the Captain Arnold Jay Isbell Trophy for excellence in airborne anti-submarine warfare in both 2009 and 2010.

In 2024, the squadron returned to Naval Air Station North Island following a five-month deployment with the Abraham Lincoln Carrier Strike Group. During the deployment, HSM-71 operated as part of Carrier Air Wing 9 aboard USS Abraham Lincoln and aboard escorting destroyers within the strike group.

== See also ==
- History of the United States Navy
- List of United States Navy aircraft squadrons
