= Otterbein =

Otterbein may refer to:

== People with the surname ==
- Philip William Otterbein (1726-1813), German-American clergyman, founder of the Church of the United Brethren in Christ
- Keith F. Otterbein, anthropologist
- Thomas Otterbein, retired US Navy captain

== Places ==
- Otterbein, Indiana
- Otterbein, Ohio
- Otterbein, Baltimore

== Other uses ==
- Otterbein University, Westerville, Ohio
- Ottenbreit
