= Thomas Shannon =

Thomas or Tom Shannon may refer to:

== Politics ==
- Thomas A. Shannon Jr. (born 1958), U.S. Department of State official
- Thomas Bowles Shannon (1827–1897), member of the California State Assembly and U.S. representative from California, 1863–1865
- Thomas Shannon (Ohio politician) (1786–1846), U.S. representative from Ohio, 1826–1827
- Tom Shannon (Australian politician) (1884–1954), member of the New South Wales Legislative Assembly

== Others ==
- Thomas Shannon (rugby league), rugby league footballer
- Thomas K. Shannon, U.S. naval officer
- Tommy Shannon (born 1946), American bass guitarist
- Tom Shannon (artist) (born 1947), American artist and inventor
- Tom Shannon (broadcaster) (1938–2021), American broadcaster and songwriter
