= USS Harry S. Truman =

US Navy Nimitz-class aircraft carrier

USS Harry S. Truman (CVN-75)
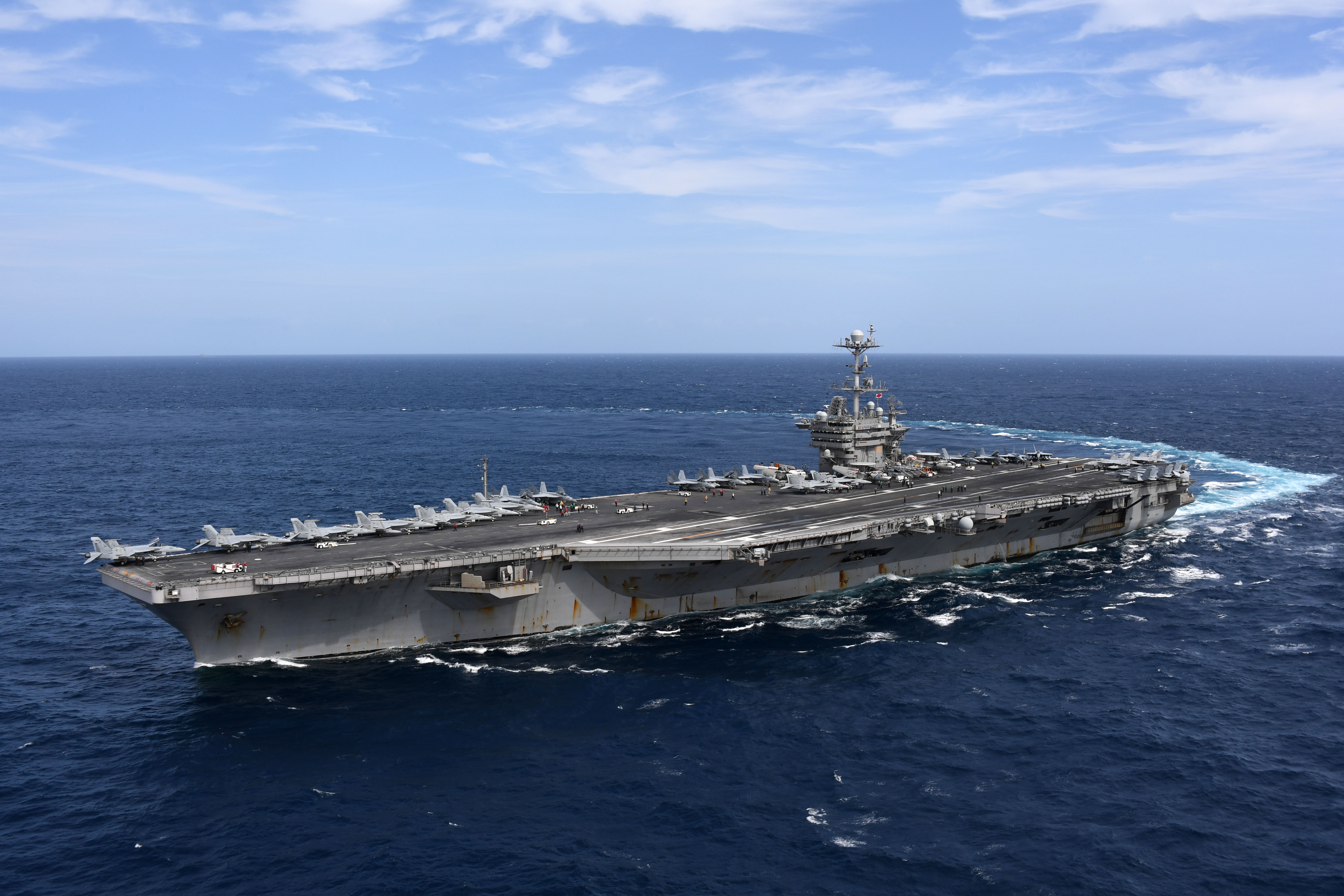
- USS Harry S. Truman (CVN-75) underway in the Atlantic Ocean on 11 September 2018

History

United States
- Name: Harry S. Truman
- Namesake: Harry S. Truman
- Ordered: 30 June 1988
- Builder: Newport News Shipbuilding
- Cost: $4.5 billion
- Laid down: 29 November 1993
- Launched: 7 September 1996
- Christened: 7 September 1996
- Acquired: 30 June 1998
- Commissioned: 25 July 1998
- Renamed: from United States, February 1995
- Home port: Norfolk, Virginia
- Identification: MMSI number: 368800000; Callsign: NHST; Hull number: CVN-75
- Motto: The Buck Stops Here
- Nickname(s): HST
- Status: in active service, undergoing Refuelling and Complex Overhaul (RCOH).
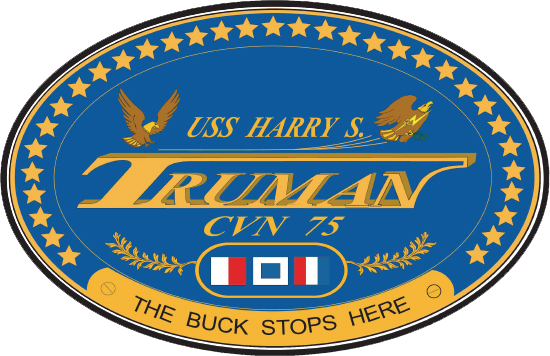
- Badge

General characteristics
- Class & type: Nimitz-class aircraft carrier
- Displacement: 103,900 long tons (105,600 t)
- Length: Overall: 1,092 ft (332.8 m); Waterline: 1,040 ft (317.0 m)
- Beam: Overall: 252 ft (76.8 m); Waterline: 134 ft (40.8 m)
- Draft: Maximum navigational: 37 ft (11.3 m); Limit: 41 ft (12.5 m)
- Propulsion: 2 × Westinghouse A4W nuclear reactors (HEU 93.5%); 4 × steam turbines; 4 × shafts; 260,000 shp (190 MW)
- Speed: 30 knots (56 km/h; 35 mph)+
- Range: Unlimited distance; 20–25 years
- Complement: Ship's company: 3,532; Air wing: 2,480
- Sensors & processing systems: AN/SPS-48E 3-D air search radar; AN/SPS-49(V)5 2-D air search radar; AN/SPQ-9B target acquisition radar; AN/SPN-46 air traffic control radars; AN/SPN-43C air traffic control radar; AN/SPN-41 landing aid radars; 4 × Mk 91 NSSM guidance systems; 4 × Mk 95 radars
- Electronic warfare & decoys: AN/SLQ-32A(V)4 countermeasures suite; SLQ-25A Nixie torpedo countermeasures
- Armament: 2 × Mk 57 Mod3 Sea Sparrow; 2 × RIM-116 Rolling Airframe Missile; 3 × Phalanx CIWS
- Aircraft carried: 90 fixed wing and helicopters

USS Harry S. Truman (CVN-75) is the eighth Nimitz-class aircraft carrier of the United States Navy, and is named after the 33rd President of the United States, Harry S. Truman. She is homeported at Naval Station Norfolk, Virginia.

Harry S. Truman was launched on 7 September 1996 by Newport News Shipbuilding, Newport News, Virginia, and commissioned on 25 July 1998 with Captain Thomas Otterbein in command.

Built at a cost of more than $4.5 billion in 2007 dollars ($6.72 billion today), Harry S. Truman (also known as HST within the Navy) is 1,092 feet (333 m) long and 257 feet (78 m) wide, and is as high as a 24-story building, at 244 feet (74 m). The supercarrier can accommodate 6,250 crewmembers and around 90 aircraft. Aircraft move between the hangar bay and the 4.5-acre (1.8 ha) flight deck on four 3,880 ft^{2} (360 m^{2}) elevators. With a combat load, HST displaces almost 97,000 tons, including two 30-ton Mark II stockless anchors taken from USS Forrestal; each link of the anchor chain weighs 360 pounds (160 kg). She is armed with three 20 mm Phalanx CIWS mounts and two Sea Sparrow SAM launchers. The ship is powered by two Westinghouse A4W nuclear reactors that can propel the ship more than three million miles before refueling. The ship's quartet of five-bladed, 66,220-pound (30.04 t) propellers that can produce speeds over 30 knots (56 km/h; 35 mph).

Since 2001, Harry S. Truman has been deployed in support of many conflicts and operations, including Operation Joint Endeavor, Operation Deny Flight, Operation Enduring Freedom – Afghanistan, Operation Iraqi Freedom, and Operation Inherent Resolve. In 2025, the aircraft carrier was attacked six times by ballistic missiles fired by the Houthis.

In September, 2026, Harry S. Truman began her mid-life refueling and complex overhaul in Newport News, Virginia, and is expected to remain there until 2031.

== Ship history ==
=== Pre-commissioning and construction ===
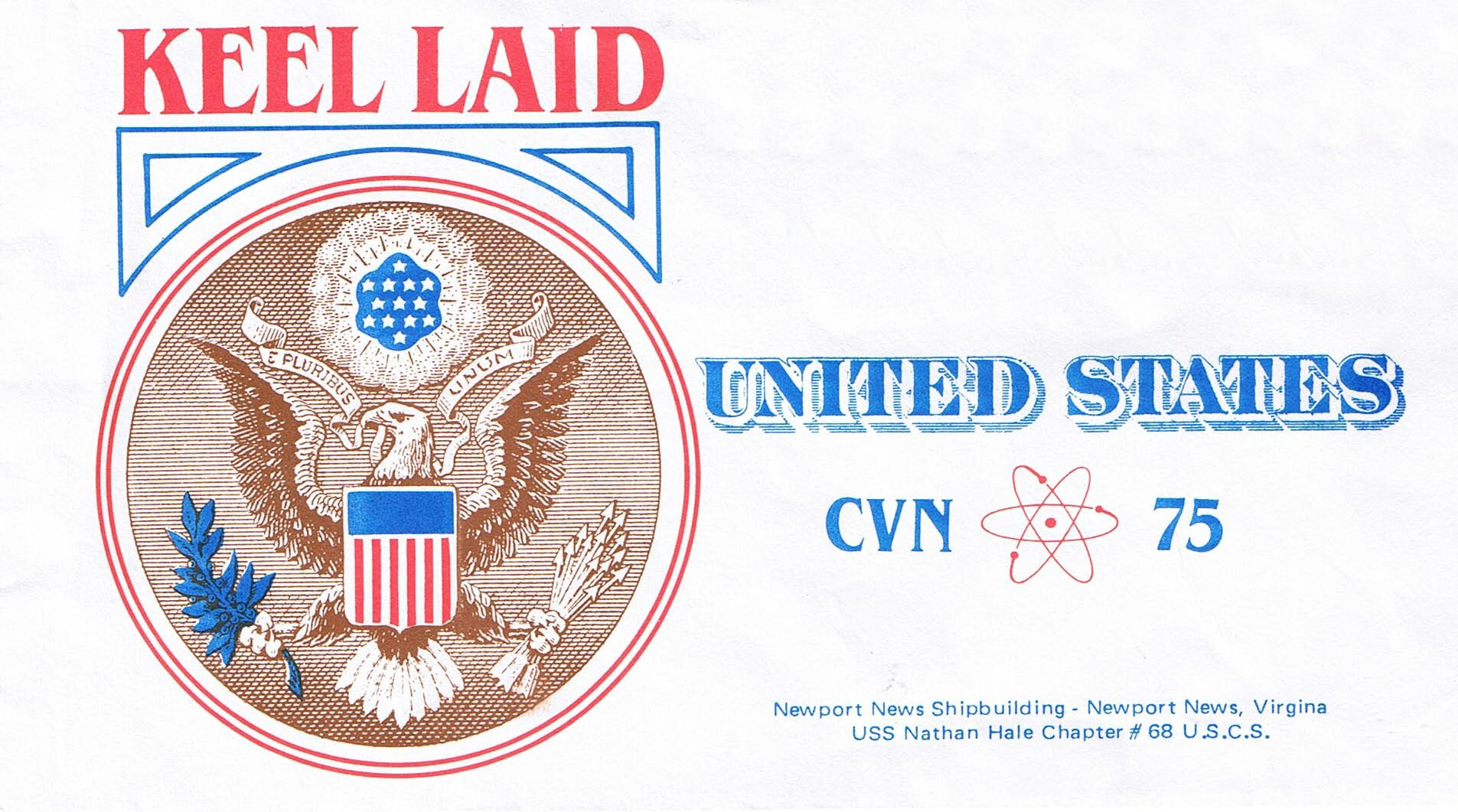
A cover for the keel laying of CVN-75 showing her keel was laid as USS United States

Her keel was laid by Newport News Shipbuilding on 29 November 1993 as USS United States, but her name was changed in February 1995 at the direction of then-Secretary of the Navy John H. Dalton. The ship was christened on 7 September 1996 and launched six days later.

Three Newport News ship workers died during construction when a pump room filled with methane and hydrogen sulfide gases during a sewage leak on 12 July 1997. They are commemorated by a brass plaque in the tunnel off Hangar Bay No. 1. The crew began moving aboard from contract housing in Newport News in January 1998. The ship completed builder's sea trial on 11 June 1998 after a short delay due to noises in one of the reactor closure heads. The ship was accepted by the Navy on 30 June 1998.

=== Commissioning ===
Harry S. Truman was commissioned on 25 July 1998 at Naval Station Norfolk. At the ceremony, the keynote speaker was President Bill Clinton. Other notable attendees and speakers were: Rep. Ike Skelton, D-Mo., who had pushed to have the carrier named after the 33rd president; Missouri Governor Mel Carnahan; Captain Thomas Otterbein, Harry S. Truman's first commanding officer; Secretary of Defense William Cohen; and Secretary of the Navy John H. Dalton.

=== 1998–1999 ===
In August 1998, Harry S. Truman left port for the first time to conduct certifications to test her ability to recover and launch aircraft. That was followed by sea trials and training exercises. In November, one of the Navy Blue Angels aircraft landed on HST, the only time the demonstration team has ever landed an aircraft on a carrier.

=== 2000–2001 ===
On 28 November 2000, Harry S. Truman began her maiden deployment with Carrier Air Wing 3 (CVW-3) on board. On 26 December 2000, the ship transited the Suez Canal.

For several months, the ship operated in support of Operation Southern Watch. Carrier Air Wing Three fly 869 combat sorties, including a strike on Iraqi integrated air defense system sites in a sanctioned response to Iraqi surface-to-air missile fire against United Nations Security Council coalition forces. Combat operations ended on 27 April. The carrier returned to the U.S. on 23 May, having steamed 44,000 nautical miles (81,000 km; 51,000 mi). She entered Norfolk Naval Shipyard in Portsmouth, Virginia, for her first planned incremental availability (PIA) on 5 September 2001.

=== 2002–2003 ===
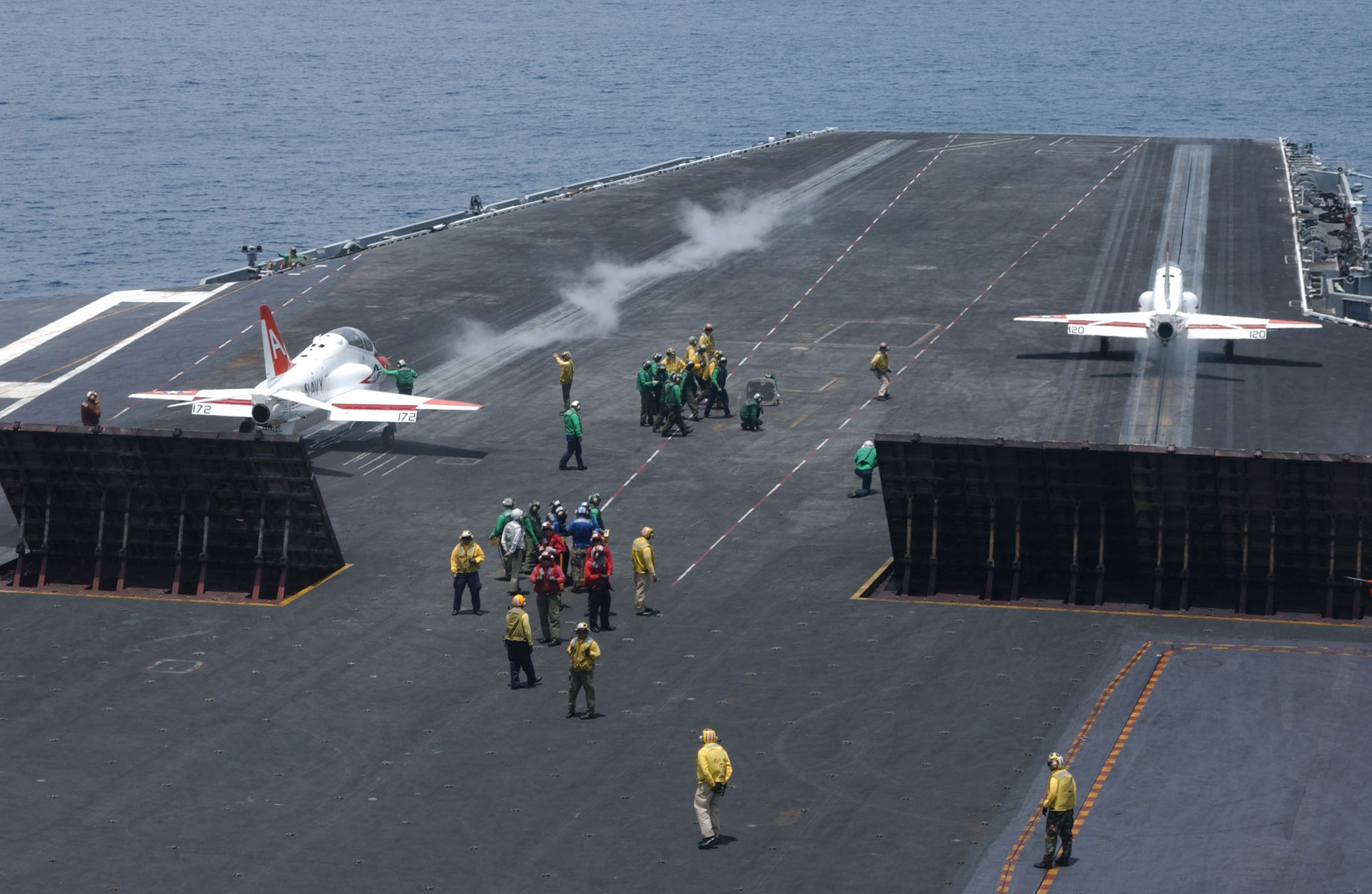
A pair of T-45 Goshawks of VT-7 Eagles stand on Harry S. Truman's forward catapults awaiting launch during carrier qualifications in July 2003

On 5 December 2002, HST left for her second deployment, again with CVW-3 embarked, visiting Marseille, France; Souda Bay, Crete; and Koper, Slovenia. Between 19 March and 18 April, airwing aircraft flew nearly 1,300 combat sorties from the Mediterranean Sea in the early stages of 2003 invasion of Iraq. The ship stopped in Portsmouth, England, before returning to Norfolk on 23 May.

In August 2003, Harry S. Truman began her second PIA at Norfolk Naval Shipyard (NNSY).

=== 2004–2005 ===
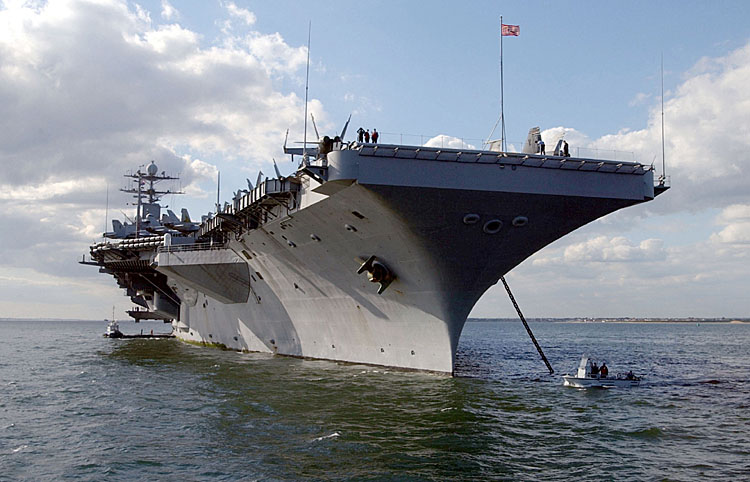
The ship anchored outside Portsmouth, England, date unknown

On 13 February 2004, Harry S. Truman left under budget and four days early from Norfolk Naval Shipyard.

On 2 June 2004, the ship "surged" for Exercise Summer Pulse, deploying to the Mediterranean Sea. The ship called at Naples, Italy, and participated in Operation Majestic Eagle in the eastern Atlantic Ocean before returning to NNSY on 25 July.

On 1 October 2004, as part of a Navy-wide series of redesignations, Harry S. Truman's immediate superior in command changed to Carrier Strike Group Ten. The ship set out from Norfolk on her third extended deployment on 13 October 2004, and visited Souda Bay, Crete, before relieving USS John F. Kennedy on 20 November in the Persian Gulf. Harry S. Truman and CVW-3 launched 2,577 sorties, totaling nearly 13,000 flight hours, flying combat missions over Iraq and maritime security operations before being relieved by USS Carl Vinson Carrier Strike Group in the Persian Gulf on 19 March 2005. Despite plans to cross the equator and visit South Africa, diplomatic issues caused her, instead, to transit the Suez Canal, stopping in Portsmouth, England, before returning home on 18 April 2005.

On 1 September 2005, Harry S. Truman set sail for to help the U.S. Gulf Coast devastated by Hurricane Katrina. She arrived in the Gulf of Mexico on 4 September and served as the flagship for the naval task force. While the ship's strike group (Carrier Strike Group 10) commander, Rear Adm. Joseph Kilkenny, was appointed deputy commander of Joint Task Force Gulf Coast (also known as JTF Katrina and Rita), the ship remained anchored in the gulf and provided desalinated water for the relief effort via helicopter (the actual command hub for the JTF was USS Iwo Jima). The carrier also provided support to JRB New Orleans in the form of aviation boatswain's mates and cooks to keep that station in operation. Harry S. Truman returned to home port in October 2005 after five weeks of relief efforts.

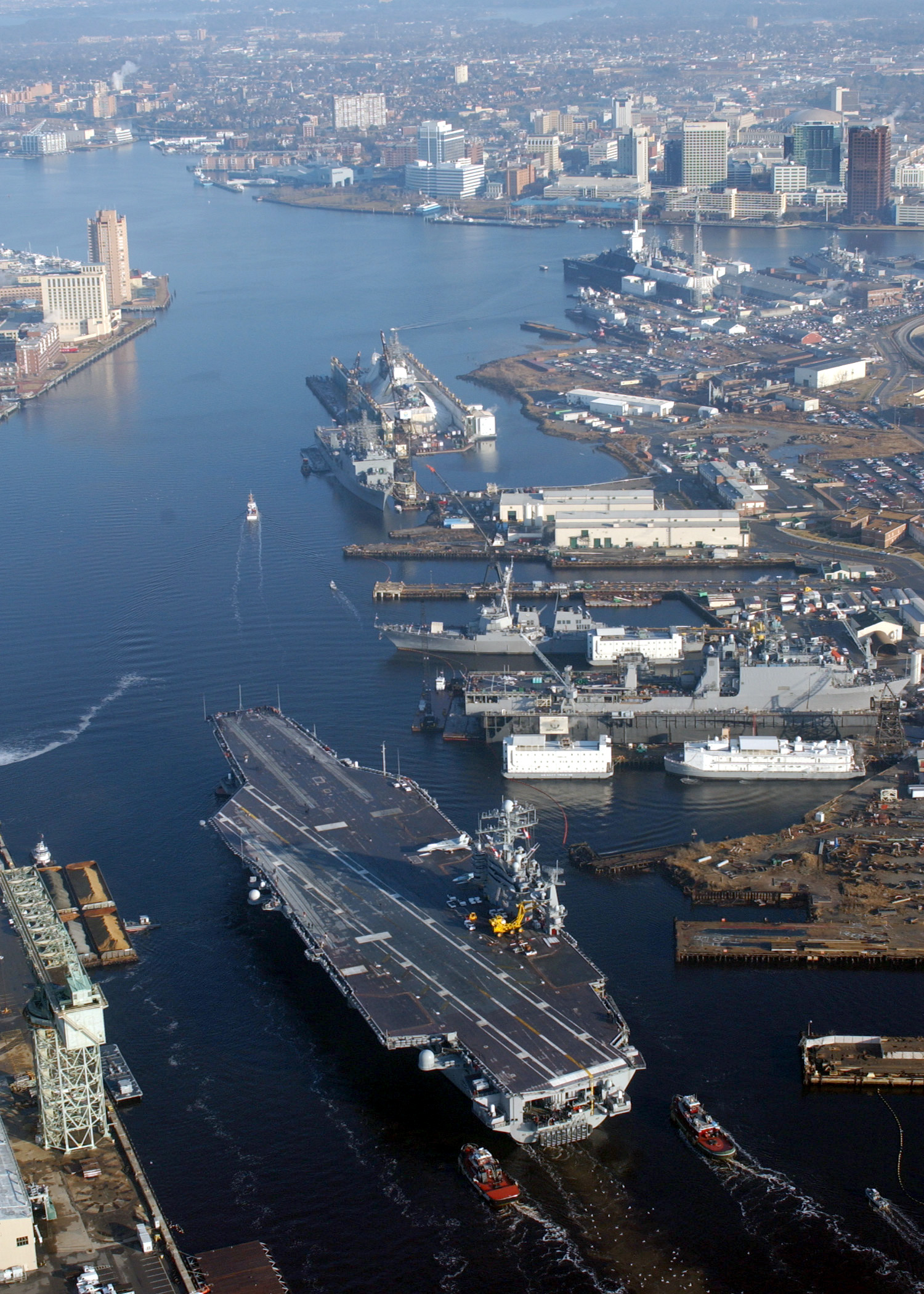
Harry S. Truman in the Elizabeth River near NNSY in 2004

=== 2006 ===
In January, Harry S. Truman entered the NNSY for a docked PIA. The ship received many system upgrades. Minor weld defects in the reactor plants were repaired. She left the yard in December and continued preparations for surge beginning in April 2007.

=== 2007 ===
On 15 August, an E-2C Hawkeye crashed after taking off from the carrier, killing all three crewmembers.

On 5 November, Harry S. Truman left Norfolk for her fourth extended deployment with CVW-3 embarked in support of OIF.

=== 2008 ===
HST returned to the U.S. in June. She first pulled into Naval Station Mayport, Florida, to welcome aboard family and friends for a three-day "Tiger Cruise" or Family Day Cruise, before returning to Norfolk Naval Station on 4 June 2008. The ship was awarded her fourth Battle E award for the East Coast (for 2008) in early 2009. Jimmy Buffett visited the ship and performed a concert on 28 January.

=== 2009 ===
In February, HST completed a nearly seven-month PIA at the NNSY in Portsmouth, Virginia.

On 5 August, EA-18G Growlers from Electronic Attack Squadron 129 (VAQ-129) and Electronic Attack Squadron 132 (VAQ-132) completed their first at-sea carrier-arrested landing (trap) aboard Harry S. Truman.

=== 2010 ===
Harry S. Truman began a seven-month deployment to the 5th and 6th Fleet areas of operations in support of maritime security operations.

On 21 May, Harry S. Truman led a task force of 11 American warships and 5,000 men into the Suez Canal.

On 20 June, the ship visited four ports during her 213 days at sea, including Marseille, France; Dubai, U.A.E; Manama, Bahrain; and Souda Bay, Crete, before returning to the United States on 21 December. During the deployment, Harry S. Truman traveled more than 50,000 nautical miles and flew more than 10,000 sorties in support of Operations Enduring Freedom and New Dawn.

=== 2011 ===
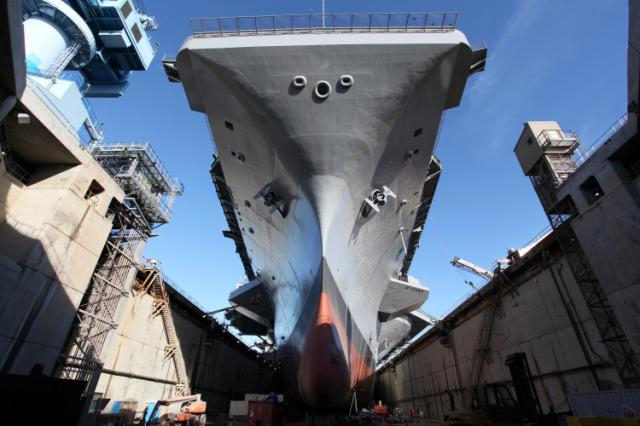
Dry docked

On 2 February, Commander, Naval Air Force U.S. Atlantic Fleet named Harry S. Truman as the Battle "E", award winner, which was her third consecutive Battle "E" award. This was the sixth award in the ship's 12-year history, having previously won the Battle "E" award in 2003, 2004, 2005, 2008, and 2009.

Harry S. Truman entered a docked PIA at NNSY in late March.

On 28 February, the aircraft carrier began her dry-docking PIA maintenance and yard overhaul period at NNSY in Portsmouth (pictured). During this maintenance cycle, Harry S. Truman received a new main mast, an upgrade in her close-in weapons systems, and the installation of the automated digital network system, which provides the carrier with enhanced communications and cooperative engagement capabilities to assess possible threats. Harry S. Truman was expected to complete this DPIA yard overhaul in early 2012 and begin preparations for her sixth overseas deployment. Also, her berthing spaces were also upgraded, installing 2,500 racks, replacing 46,000 square feet of deck and painting 106,000 square feet of spaces.

On 8 November, Captain Tushar Tembe died after collapsing on a pier near the ship. The ship's executive officer (XO) assumed the role of acting command officer, until relieved by Captain Dee L. Mewbourne three days later, and resuming his post as XO.

=== 2012 ===
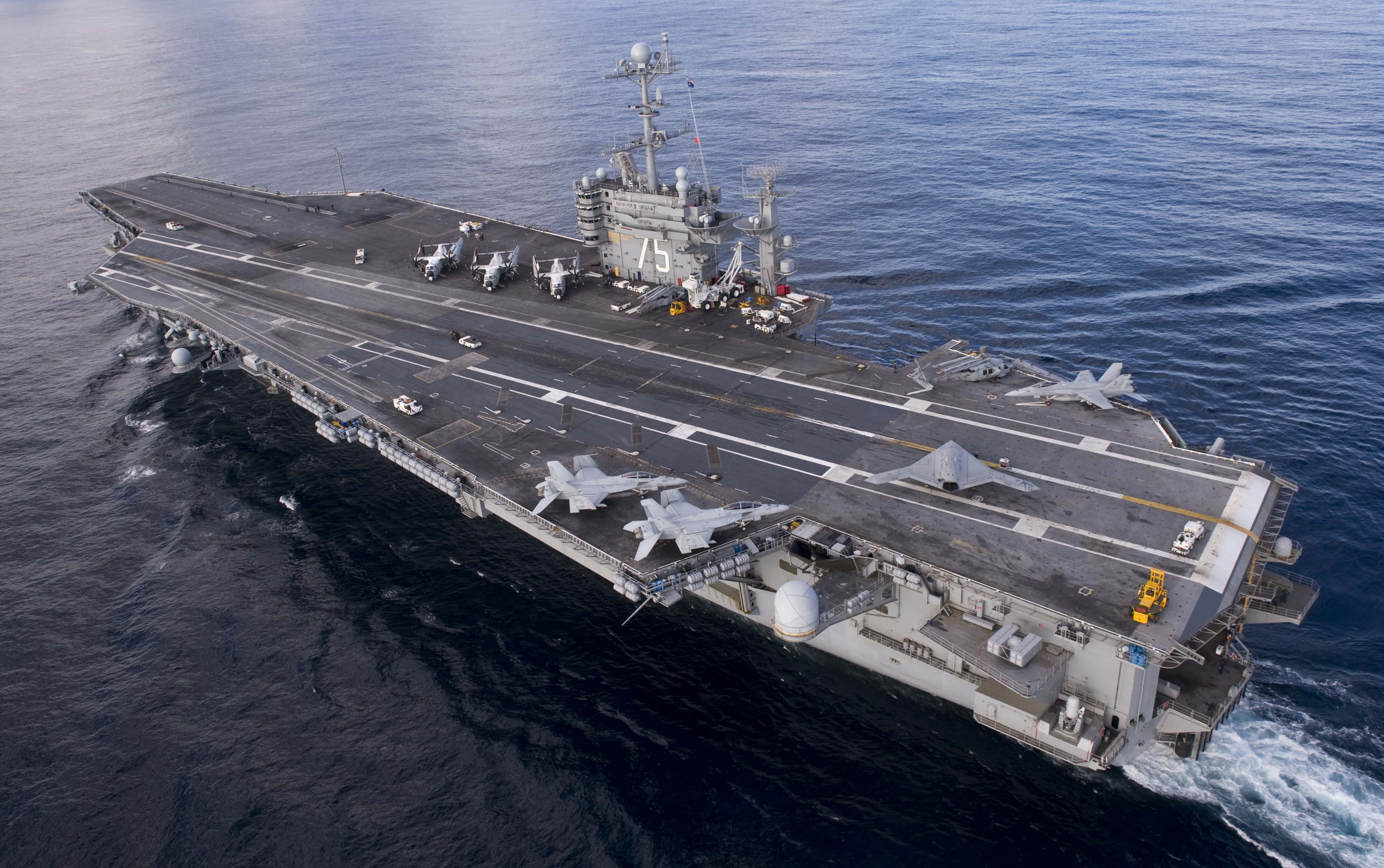
Harry S. Truman on carrier qualifications in the Atlantic in December 2012: Three C-2A Greyhounds are parked adjacent to the ship's island; behind them is a single SH-60F Seahawk; a second Seahawk is parked on the starboard side aft with an F/A-18E Super Hornet; an X-47B UCAV is taxiing from the port side aft, about to pass a pair of F/A-18F Super Hornets parked on the port side overhang.

On 7 April, Norfolk Naval Shipyard completed the ship's nuclear power plant modernization and testing was to begin to ensure her readiness for sea trials lasting 90 days. Harry S. Truman returned to the U.S. Navy fleet in the summer of 2012.

On 26 November, an X-47B unmanned combat air system was hoisted on board Harry S. Truman in preparation for an unmanned aircraft's first, carrier-based testing. Harry S. Truman was to be the first aircraft carrier in naval aviation history to host test operations for an unmanned aircraft. Testing on the X-47B was conducted over a three-week period that included in-port and underway demonstrations aboard. The X-47B successfully completed carrier deck tests aboard Harry S. Truman on 18 December 2012.

=== 2013 ===
On 6 February, the U.S. Department of Defense announced that the upcoming deployment of Harry S. Truman, the Ticonderoga-class guided-missile cruiser Gettysburg, and the rest of Carrier Strike Group 10 will be postponed pending the resolution of the upcoming budget sequestration, leaving the carrier John C. Stennis and her carrier strike group as the only carrier force operating in the Persian Gulf region. The strike group was originally scheduled to depart Naval Station Norfolk, Virginia, on 8 February 2013.

On 22 July, Harry S. Truman left for an extended deployment to the 5th Fleet area of responsibility, and settled into her mission of supporting Operation Enduring Freedom and the coalition of troops on the ground in Afghanistan.

=== 2014 ===
On 14 February, the Commander, Naval Air Force U.S. Atlantic Fleet named Harry S. Truman as the East Coast aircraft carrier Battle "E" award winner.

On 23 March, Harry S. Truman was relieved by George H.W. Bush in the U.S. 5th Fleet area of responsibility, conducting maritime security operations and supporting theater security cooperation efforts.

=== 2015 ===
On 16 November, Harry S. Truman, assigned with Carrier Air Wing Seven, began a scheduled deployment to the U.S. 6th and 5th Fleet areas of operation. The carrier was accompanied by the cruiser Anzio and Destroyer Squadron 28, Bulkeley, Gonzalez, Ramage and Gravely.

On 21 December, Djibouti President Ismail Omar Guelleh visited USS Harry S. Truman stationed near the Yemeni island of Berim. On 26 December while transiting the Strait of Hormuz, several unguided rockets fired by Iran landed about 1,500 yards (1,400 m) away from Harry S. Truman, which was traveling with the destroyer Bulkeley and the Provence. Iran had announced over maritime radio it was carrying out tests "only 23 minutes before" and was criticized by the U.S. Central Command for "Firing weapons so close to passing coalition ships and commercial traffic within an internationally recognized maritime traffic lane."

On 29 December, Harry S. Truman began launching strikes against the Islamic State group. By mid-April 2016, aircraft of Carrier Air Wing Seven operating from the carrier had dropped 1,118 pieces of ordnance in operations against the group, surpassing a record of 1,085 pieces that was set by aircraft assigned to USS Theodore Roosevelt in 2015.

=== 2016 ===
On 12 January, an unarmed Iranian drone flew directly over Harry S. Truman in international waters and took "precise" photos, according to state television in the Islamic Republic. In the first half of 2016, Harry S. Truman, as flagship of Carrier Strike Group 8, carried out an eight-month air operation deployment against ISIL from the Eastern Mediterranean as part of Operation Inherent Resolve. On 3 June, F/A-18 Hornets launched from Harry S. Truman conducted air strikes against ISIS targets from the eastern Mediterranean. It was the first time the U.S. Navy had conducted strike missions in the Middle East from the Mediterranean Sea since flying operations against the Iraqi military in 2003.

CVW-1 was reassigned to Harry S. Truman. On 25 August, she entered NNSY for her "10-month" PIA that is "expected to be completed" a year after work officially begins on 27 September.

=== 2017 ===
On 21 July, the refit was concluded and was followed by various training exercises placing emphasis on damage control, flight deck operations, and simulated combat at-sea.

=== 2018 ===
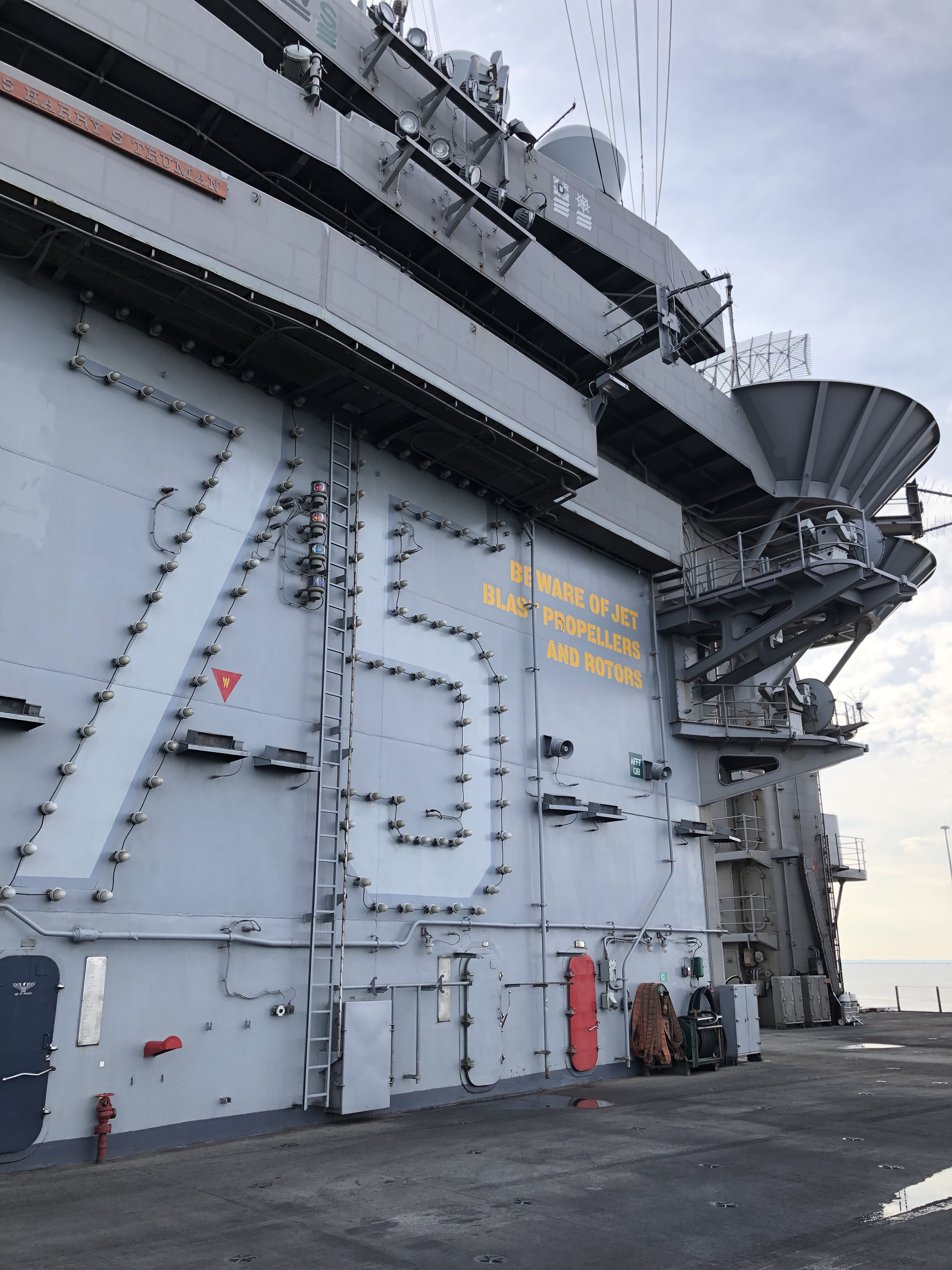
Island of Harry S. Truman

Carrier Strike Group 8 began a further scheduled deployment to the Middle East and Europe on 11 April 2018. The carrier returned to Norfolk on 21 July and left again for operations in the Western Atlantic Ocean on 28 August.

On 25 October, the carrier took part in the NATO exercise Trident Juncture, which was held in and around Norway.

=== 2019 ===
On 27 February, the Pentagon announced that Harry S. Truman's midlife refueling and overhaul, tentatively scheduled for 2024, may be cancelled and the ship instead retired early as a cost-saving measure. The likelihood of the ship actually being decommissioned more than 20 years ahead of schedule was uncertain, as this would have left the carrier fleet at 10 ships, one below the legally mandated level. The nominated chief of naval operations told Congress he supports "to forgo" the $ 3.5 billion overhaul scheduled for HST. Congress prevented the Navy from taking the same action with sister ship George Washington in 2016, as well as the White House, as President Donald Trump had promised to increase the carrier fleet to 12.

On 1 May, President Trump announced he overrode the decision to decommission USS Harry S. Truman.

In late August, a malfunction of the ship's electrical distribution system was announced as the cause that would prevent her scheduled deployment. The ship's electrical malfunction was repaired in late October and Harry S. Truman departed Norfolk to be deployed in the Persian Gulf. She was reported as entering the 6th Fleet region on 2 December 2019.

=== 2020 ===
In July 2020, USS Harry S. Truman was at NNSY in Portsmouth.

=== 2021 ===
Harry S. Truman, along with CVW-1 and her battlegroup, deployed out to sea on 1 December 2021. She was originally planned to transit the Suez Canal into the Middle East, but in light of the standoff between Russia and Ukraine in late 2021 escalating, the carrier was ordered to stay in the Mediterranean.

=== 2022 ===
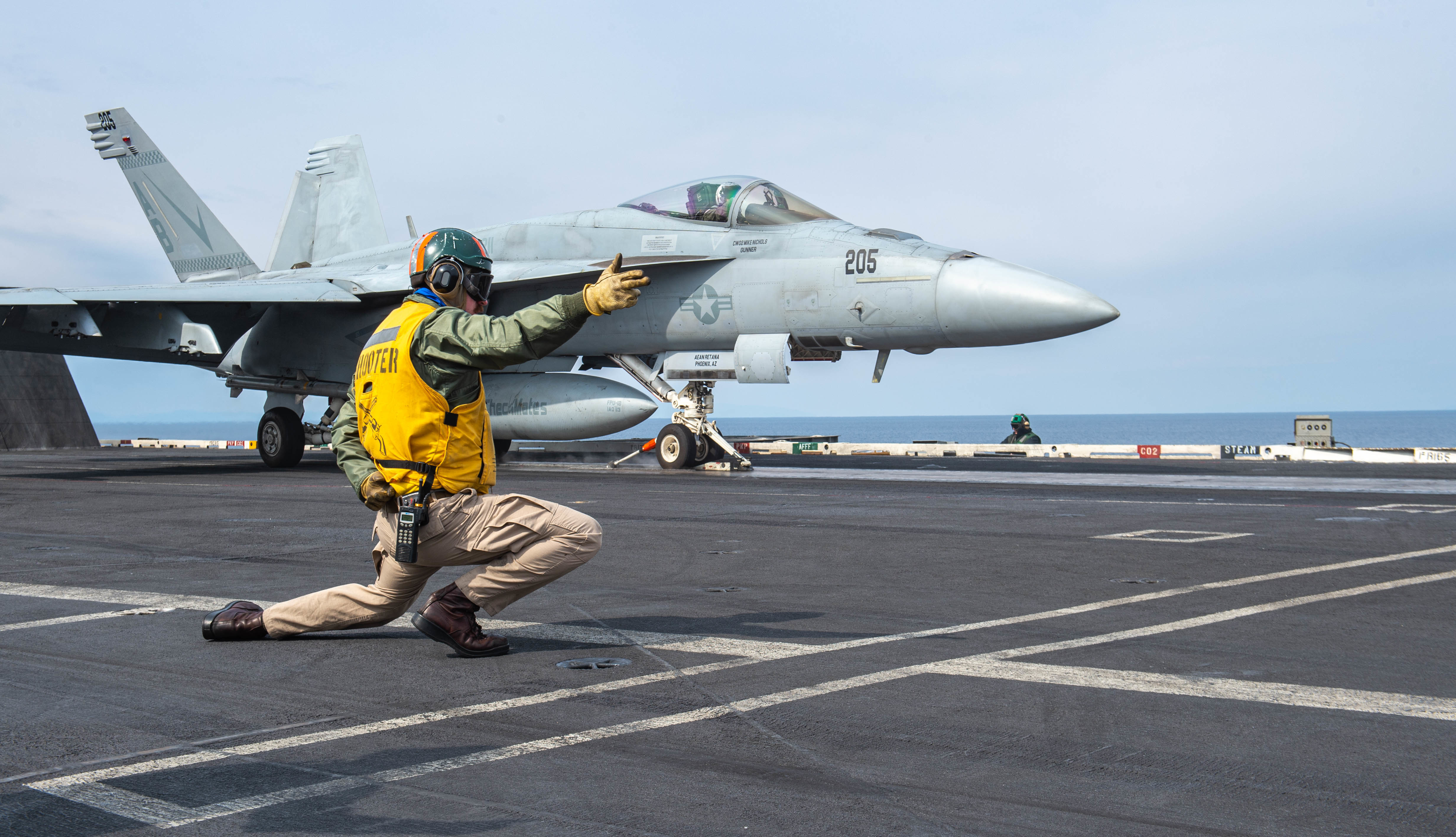
An F/A-18E Super Hornet of VFA-211 is launched from Harry S. Truman, March 2022: The pictured aircraft was blown overboard into the Mediterranean Sea in July 2022.

In January 2022, Harry S. Truman and her strike group came under command of NATO's Naval Striking and Support Forces for the first time since the Cold War, for a 10-day exercise patrolling the Mediterranean. From 17 to 23 May, Harry S. Truman and Carrier Strike Group 8 took part in the NATO vigilance activity, Neptune Shield 2022.

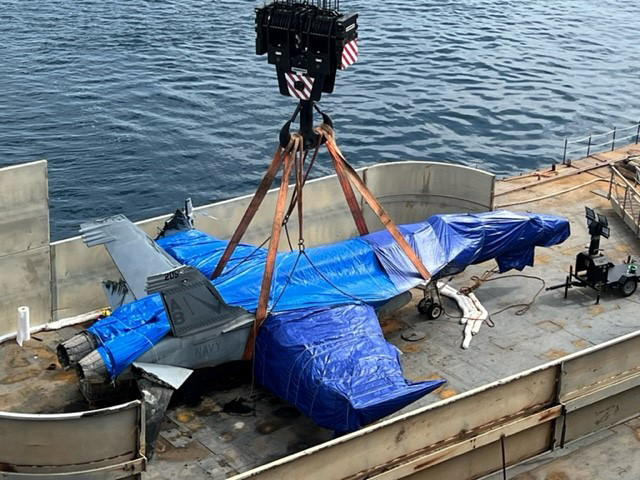
The recovered aircraft aboard USNS Mendonca at the Port of Augusta, 16 August 2022

On 8 July, an F/A-18E Super Hornet of Carrier Air Wing One was blown overboard into the Mediterranean Sea. The carrier had encountered unexpected heavy weather while conducting a replenishment-at-sea. One sailor received minor injuries. On 8 August 2022, the United States Sixth Fleet announced the lost aircraft had been recovered from a depth of 9,500 feet (2,900 m) using a remotely operated CURV-21 recovery vehicle. On 8 August, The Aviationist reported that based on a photo sent to the outlet, taken at the Port of Augusta, Sicily, they were able to identify the involved aircraft as the aircraft with modex 205, part of Strike Fighter Squadron 211 (VFA-211). The aircraft was loaded aboard Military Sealift Command roll-on/roll-off ship USNS Mendonca at the Port of Augusta on 16 August to be transported back to the United States.

Harry S. Truman returned to Naval Station Norfolk on 12 September. On 21 November, the Navy accepted Auxiliary Personnel Lighter 68 (APL68), with around 600 berths, saying it would support the impending Harry S. Truman carrier repair cycle.

=== 2024 ===
Harry S. Truman deployed on 23 September 2024 to the 6th fleet. After completing NATO exercises in the North Sea, she entered the Oslofjord for a visit on 1 November.

On 14 December, she transited the Suez Canal and entered the Middle East. She launched her first combat sorties in support of Operation Prosperity Guardian against the Houthi rebels in Yemen on 21 December. On 22 December 2024, an F/A-18F Super Hornet from VFA-11 was shot down by USS Gettysburg in a friendly fire incident. Both crewmembers of the aircraft survived.

=== 2025 ===
On 1 February, HST launched 27 F/A-18 Super Hornets as part of an airstrike against ISIS-Somalia leaders in caves about 50 miles southeast of Bosaso. The aircraft dropped 124,000 pounds of ordnance on targets in what the Navy called its largest air strike ever.

On 12 February, Harry S. Truman and the Panamanian-flagged merchant vessel Besiktas-M collided about 11:46 p.m. local time while operating near Port Said, Egypt, in the Mediterranean Sea. There were no reports of flooding or injuries, but the ship suffered damage. An investigation into the collision was launched. One week later Harry S. Truman's commanding officer, Captain Dave Snowden, was relieved of command.

In March 2025, the United States launched more than 47 airstrikes across Yemen. In response, the Yemeni army targeted Harry S. Truman in two attacks using ballistic missiles, cruise missiles, and drones. These two attacks were followed by a third attack the next day.

On 28 April, while under attack by missiles and drones from the Houthis, Harry S. Truman made a hard turn, causing a F/A-18E Super Hornet that was being towed in the hangar to fall overboard and sink. On 6 May, a second Super Hornet was lost when arresting gear failed to catch the plane during landing. After an eight-month deployment, Harry S. Truman returned to Naval Station Norfolk on 1 June.

=== 2026 ===
On September 30th, 2026, Harry S. Truman arrived at Newport News Shipbuilding to begin her mid-life refueling and complex overhaul (RCOH), the eighth Nimitz-class carrier to do so. The contract awarded to the shipyard for RCOH was worth $5.1 billion and expected to cover the work until its completion in 2031.

=== Awards ===
Harry S. Truman's awards include:

- Battenberg Cup: 2003
- Battle "E": 2003, 2004, 2005, 2008, 2009, 2010, 2014
- Dorie P. Miller Memorial Award for Food Service: 2002, 2004, 2024
- Marjorie Sterrett Battleship Fund Award (given to the most battle-ready ship in the U.S. Atlantic Fleet): 2004, 2009
- Ney Award: 1999, 2000, 2001, 2005, 2013, 2025
- Admiral Stan Arthur Award: 2004
- Combat Action Ribbon: 2025

=== Ship's seal and battle flag ===
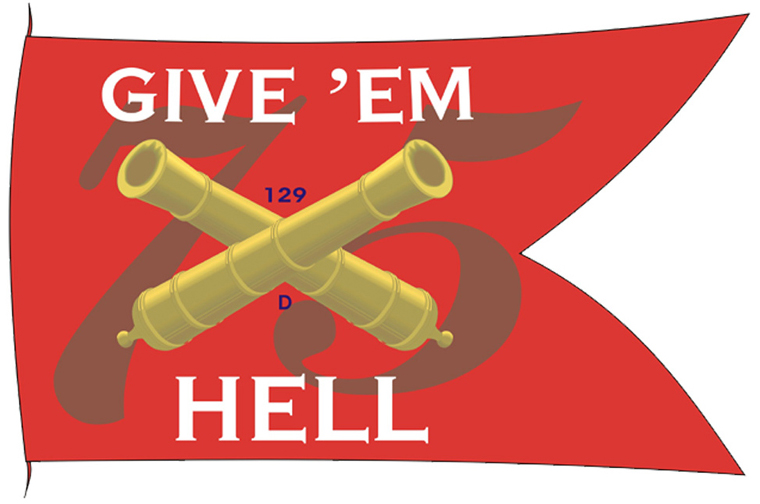
Harry S. Truman battle flag

The oval seal was designed by the ship's pre-commissioning crew and is primarily blue and gold. According to the ship's history webpage, the coat of arms "characterizes the global on-station capability of the ship and the United States Navy" and "Truman's name forms the shape of a forward-deployed aircraft carrier prepared to uphold and protect American interests". The three flags near the bottom represent the letters "HST". The 33 gold stars surrounding the seal represent Truman's position as the 33rd President.

The Harry S. Truman battle flag was designed by the ship's first navigator, and is a variation of the guidons carried by the companies of the 129th Field Artillery Regiment of the 35th Infantry Division, such as Battery D, the battery under the command of then-Army Capt. Harry Truman during World War I. It consists of crossed cannons on a scarlet background with the phrase "Give 'em hell", a reference to Truman's 1948 re-election campaign.

== See also ==
- List of aircraft carriers of the United States Navy
- List of United States Navy aircraft designations (pre-1962) (historical)
- List of United States naval aircraft (current)
- List of United States Navy aircraft squadrons
- Modern United States Navy carrier air operations
- Naval aviation
- United States Naval Aviator
