= Michael Wettlaufer =

American Navy admiral

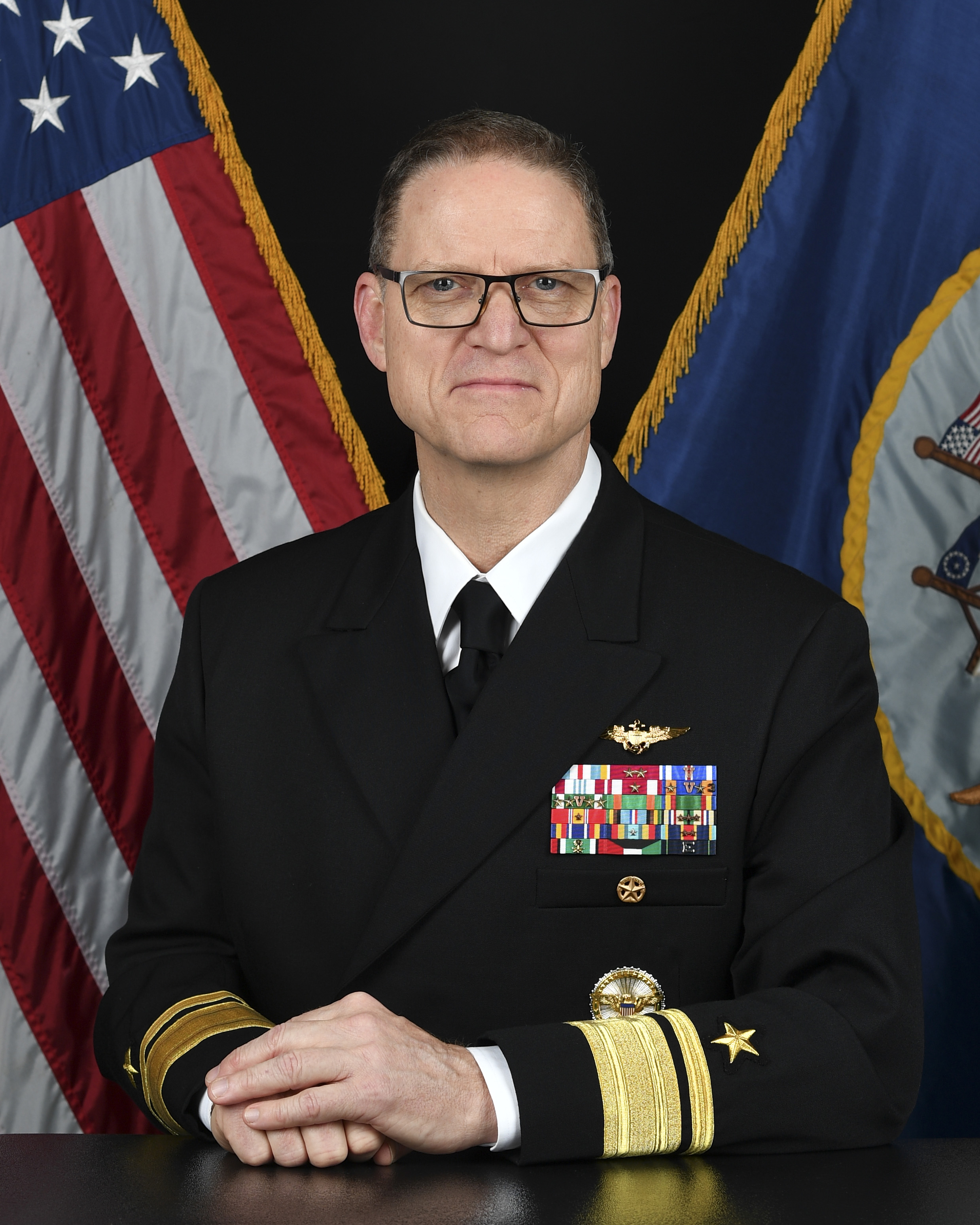
- Official portrait, 2019
- Born: 1960 (age 65–66); Alexandria, Virginia, US
- Military career
- Allegiance: United States
- Branch: United States Navy
- Service years: 1986–2023
- Rank: Rear Admiral
- Commands: Military Sealift Command; Carrier Strike Group 3; USS John C. Stennis; USS Denver; VFA-195
- Awards: Legion of Merit; Distinguished Flying Cross; Defense Meritorious Service Medal; Air Medal

Michael Andrew Wettlaufer (born 1960) is an American retired Naval officer. He commanded Carrier Strike Group 3, then Military Sealift Command, and retired as a rear admiral.

== Early life and education ==
Wettlaufer was born in Alexandria, Virginia, to Dr. John Nichols Wettlaufer, a trauma surgeon with the United States Army who retired as a colonel, and Rita Catherine Wettlaufer. He graduated with a Bachelor of Science in Microbiology from Colorado State University.

He received his commission through the Aviation Officer Candidate School in 1986 and studied to become a naval aviator at Naval Air Station Meridian, graduating in 1988. He further received a Master of Science in Aviation Systems from the University of Tennessee and a Master of Arts in National Security and Strategic Studies from the Naval War College and graduated as a Navy test pilot.

== Naval career ==
Wettlaufer was, in his time as a naval aviator, assigned to Attack Squadron 42, Attack Squadron 85, and Strike Fighter Squadron 106. He flew in three major deployments including to the Mediterranean Sea, the Indian Ocean and to the Persian Gulf during the Gulf War in 1991.

=== Collision with transmission tower ===
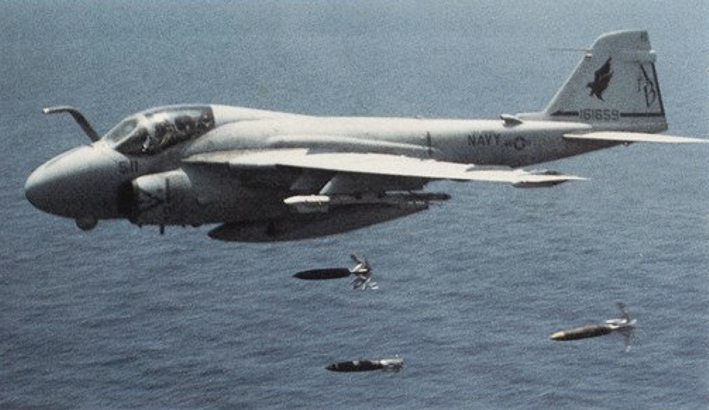
An A-6E Intruder of Attack Squadron 85 dropping bombs in 1992

During his time with Attack Squadron 85, Wettlaufer was assigned to the USS America which was deployed in December 1990. On the evening of June 26, 1991, he and his navigator and bombardier, lieutenant John Fellowes, flew from Oceana Naval Air Station to conduct a practice bombing run in a Grumman A-6 Intruder on the Pine Castle Warfare Range in the Ocala National Forest. A thunderstorm was occurring at the time.

During their flight, they collided with the transmission tower of television station WAYQ in Pierson, Florida. At first, it was believed that lightning had struck the tower; the following day, the collision was reported to the station by the Navy. The tower remained standing but was severely twisted and about 10 feet was torn off of the top of the 1,060 foot tower. The collision also tore two feet of metal off of the left wing of the aircraft, but Wettlaufer regained control, dropped their load of dummy bombs into Lake George and made an emergency landing at Jacksonville Naval Air Station about 45 miles north of the tower. Neither of the men were injured.

Officials from the station performed a helicopter survey of the tower two days after the incident; it was determined that the tower and, by extension, the station, could be out of action for several months. The incident caused between $200,000 and $999,000 in damages to the aircraft and up to $400,000 to the transmission tower. Both pilots were temporarily grounded during the investigation that followed. WAYQ had already been in bankruptcy proceedings since August 30 the previous year when the tower was clipped; it remained off-air, and a trustee was appointed to oversee its affairs. The station did not return to the air until June 1996.

=== Further career ===
Wettlaufer later became an aircraft carrier scheduler for the Commander of the 2nd Fleet, and also served as a project officer, a test pilot and a landing signal officer with the Strike Aircraft Test Directorate at Naval Air Station Patuxent River in Maryland.

He later served as a fixed-wing tutor and experimental test pilot at the Empire Test Pilots’ School for the Royal Navy. Then he became a Chief of Naval Operations Strategic Studies Group associate fellow and served as an analyst within the Office of the Secretary of Defense under the Deputy Assistant Secretary of Defense for European and NATO Policy.

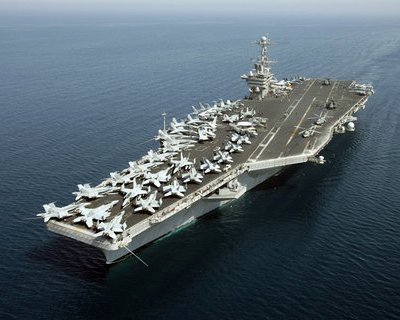
USS John C. Stennis in 2007

He began training under the Navy Nuclear Power Program in 2007, serving on the USS John C. Stennis as its executive officer. He completed his training in 2008 and continued to serve on the USS John C. Stennis until 2011, later becoming the United States European Command Deputy for Policy, Plans, Strategy, Capabilities and Resources. He then commanded the USS Denver for a short while before returning to the USS John C. Stennis on July 26, 2013, to become its commander. He held further commands, including VFA-195 and Carrier Strike Group 3 during its 2018–19 world tour, leaving the position on June 11, 2019.

On June 28, 2019, Wettlaufer succeeded Dee Mewbourne as Commander of the Military Sealift Command, an organisation responsible for the replenishment and military transport ships of the United States Navy. He was succeeded by Philip E. Sobeck on September 8, 2023.

== Personal life ==
Wettlaufer married his wife, Tina (née Matin), in April 1988.

== Awards and decorations ==
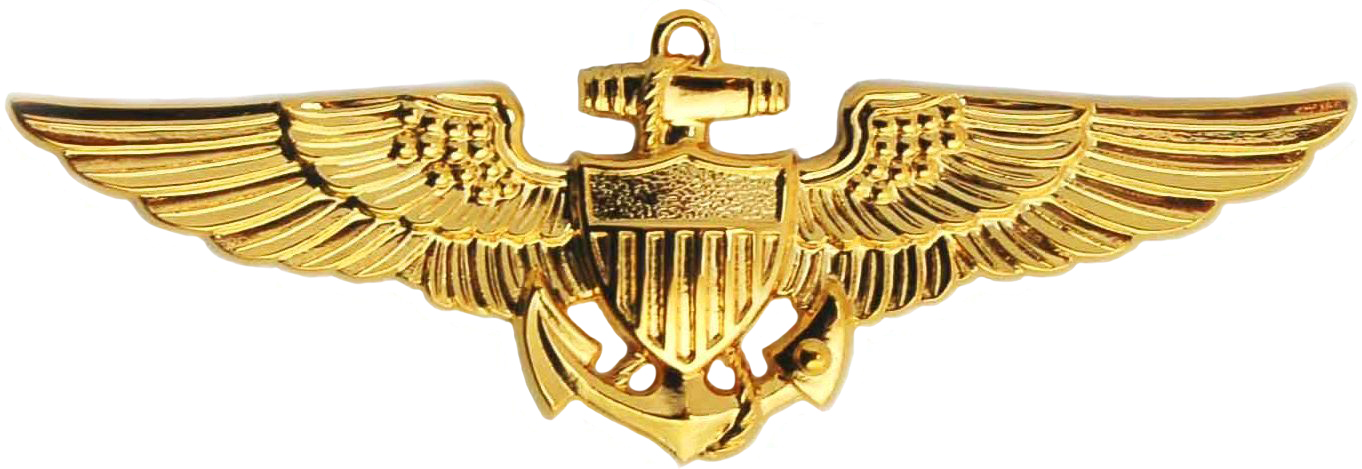

Naval Aviator Badge
Defense Superior Service Medal	Legion of Merit with two gold award stars	Distinguished Flying Cross with "V" device
Defense Meritorious Service Medal	Meritorious Service Medal with award star	Air Medal with two awards stars, on "V device", and 3 Strike/Flight numerals
Navy and Marine Corps Commendation Medal with four award stars and 'V' device	Navy and Marine Corps Achievement Medal	Navy Unit Commendation
National Defense Service Medal with bronze service star	Armed Forces Expeditionary Medal	Southwest Asia Service Medal with three campaign stars
Global War on Terrorism Service Medal with	Global War on Terrorism Expeditionary Medal with silver service star	Navy and Marine Corps Overseas Service Ribbon with two service stars
Global War on Terrorism Expeditionary Medal	Global War on Terrorism Service Medal	Navy Sea Service Deployment Ribbon with four bronze service stars
Kuwait Liberation Medal (Saudi Arabia)	Kuwait Liberation Medal (Kuwait)	Navy Expert Pistol Shot Medal
Command at Sea insignia
Office of the Secretary of Defense Identification Badge
