= Dee Mewbourne =

Retired United States Navy vice admiral (born 1961)

Dee Leon Mewbourne
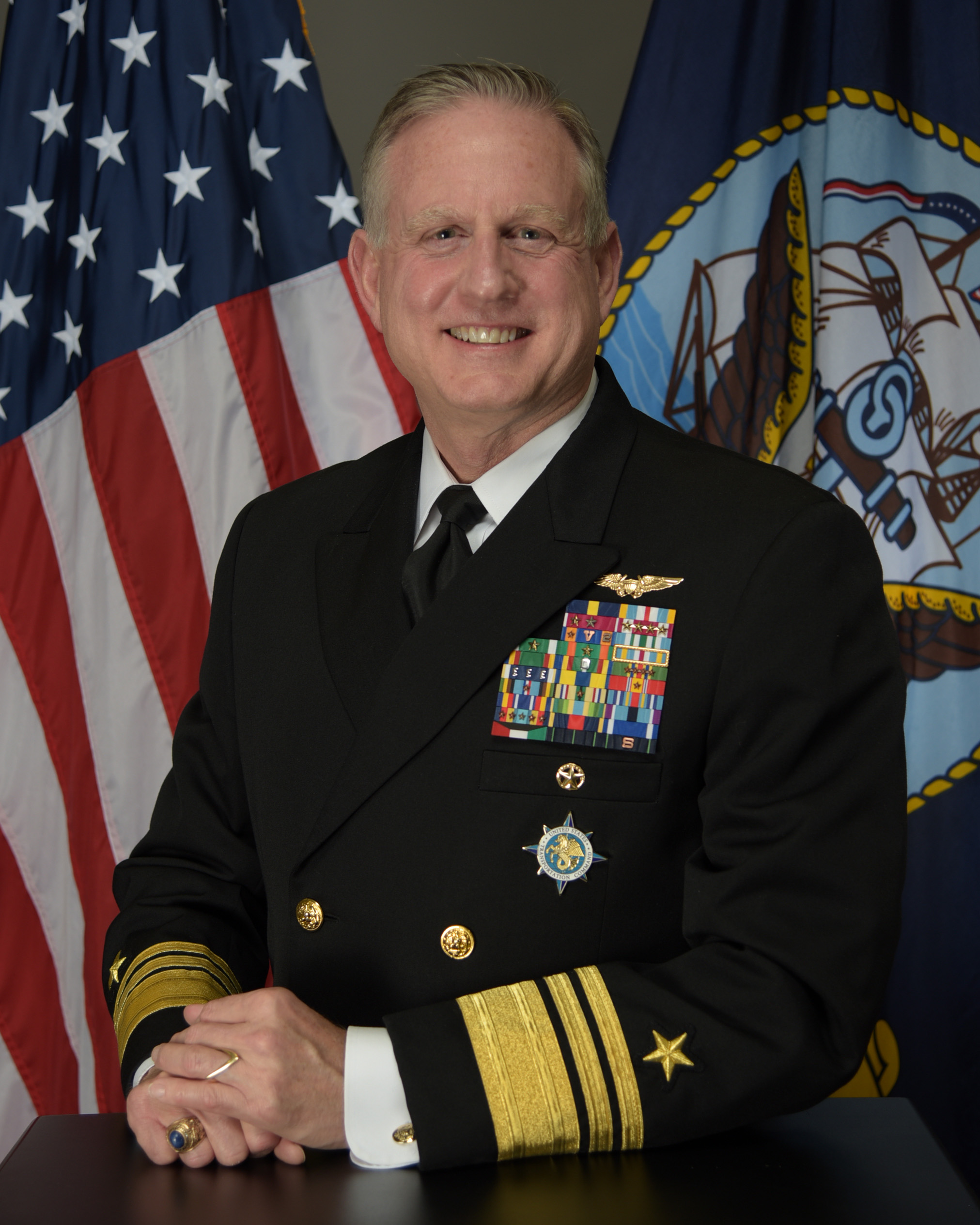
- Vice Admiral Mewbourne as Deputy, USTRANSCOM
- Born: December 9, 1961 (age 64); Ormond Beach, Florida, U.S.
- Military career
- Allegiance: United States
- Branch: United States Navy
- Service years: 1982–2022
- Rank: Vice Admiral
- Commands: Military Sealift Command; Carrier Strike Group 11; Carrier Strike Group 3 Naval Service Training Command; USS Harry S. Truman (CVN-75); USS Enterprise (CVN-65); USS Dwight D. Eisenhower (CVN-69); USS Nashville (LPD-13); VAQ-139
- Conflicts: Gulf War
- Awards: Navy Distinguished Service Medal; Defense Superior Service Medal; Legion of Merit (7)

Dee Leon Mewbourne (born December 9, 1961) is a retired United States Navy vice admiral who served as 16th deputy commander of United States Transportation Command between July 2, 2019 and June 29, 2022.

== Naval career ==
Mewbourne graduated from the United States Naval Academy in 1982 and was designated a naval flight officer in December 1983. He later earned a master's degree in business administration from Colorado State University. He is an honor graduate of the United States Naval Test Pilot School and completed the navy's Nuclear Power Program, Air Command and Staff College (ACSC), Joint Forces Staff College, and numerous executive education courses.

Mewbourne's command assignments include: Electronic Attack Squadron (VAQ) 139 aboard USS Abraham Lincoln (CVN-72), USS Nashville (LPD-13), USS Dwight D. Eisenhower (CVN-69), USS Enterprise (CVN-65), USS Harry S. Truman (CVN-75), Naval Service Training Command (NSTC), Carrier Strike Group (CSG) 3, CSG-11, and Military Sealift Command. Mewbourne holds the rare distinction of serving as commanding officer of three nuclear aircraft carriers. After serving a standard tour in command of the USS Dwight D. Eisenhower, he took command of the USS Enterprise in early 2011 after the previous CO of Enterprise was relieved for poor performance. In late 2011, Captain Mewbourne was called in to take command of the USS Harry S. Truman after the previous CO, Captain Tushar Tembe, died suddenly.

At sea, Mewbourne completed sea assignments flying the A-6E Intruder aircraft in Attack Squadron (VA) 34 embarked aboard USS America (CV-66); VA-75 aboard USS John F. Kennedy (CV-67); Carrier Air Wing (CVW) 3 aboard Eisenhower; and as the executive officer of VA-196 aboard USS Carl Vinson (CVN-70). After transitioning to the EA-6B Prowler aircraft, he served as the executive officer of VAQ-139 aboard Abraham Lincoln. He also served as the executive officer on USS George Washington (CVN-73).

Ashore, Mewbourne served as a flight instructor with VA-42, the East Coast A-6E Fleet Replacement Squadron (FRS), and project officer at the Strike Aircraft Test Directorate. Later, he served as military assistant and trip coordinator for the secretary and deputy secretary of defense; chief of staff for Navy Cyber Forces; on the staff of Commander, Naval Air Force Atlantic; and director, Maritime Operations for United States Fleet Forces Command.

While commanding Carrier Strike Group 11, Mewbourne oversaw the home port shift of USS Nimitz (CVN 68) from Everett, WA to Bremerton, WA. Mewbourne elected to volunteer the ship to conduct at-sea trials for the F-35C Lightning II rather than allowing crew members time to move their households and families to the new duty station over the Christmas holiday period.

Mewbourne retired from the U.S. Navy on June 30, 2022 at Scott Air Force Base.

== Awards and decorations ==
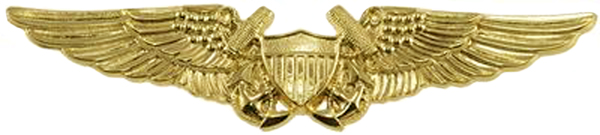

Naval Flight Officer
Navy Distinguished Service Medal	Defense Superior Service Medal	Legion of Merit with one silver and one gold award stars
Meritorious Service Medal with four award stars	Air Medal with Combat V, one bronze service star and bronze Strike/Flight numerals 2	Joint Service Commendation Medal
Navy and Marine Corps Commendation Medal with award star	Navy and Marine Corps Achievement Medal with award star	Joint Meritorious Unit Award
Navy Unit Commendation	Coast Guard Unit Commendation with "O" device	Navy Meritorious Unit Commendation
Navy "E" Ribbon with three Battle E devices	Navy Expeditionary Medal	National Defense Service Medal with service star
Armed Forces Expeditionary Medal with service star	Southwest Asia Service Medal with service star	Global War on Terrorism Expeditionary Medal
Global War on Terrorism Service Medal	Armed Forces Service Medal	Humanitarian Service Medal
Navy Sea Service Deployment Ribbon with one silver and four bronze service stars	Navy Accession Training Service Ribbon	NATO Medal for the former Yugoslavia
Kuwait Liberation Medal (Kuwait)	Navy Rifle Marksmanship Ribbon	Navy Pistol Sharpshooter Ribbon
Command at Sea insignia
United States Transportation Command Badge

- He received the Carl Vinson Leadership Award at the Naval Academy.
- Upon completing initial flight training in the A-6E Intruder at VA-42 in 1985, he was selected as the Replacement Bombardier/Navigator of the Year.
- In 1987, he was selected as the East Coast A-6 community’s Junior Intruder of the Year.
- In August 2012, he was awarded the Truman Foundation Leadership Award for inspirational leadership.

Military offices
Preceded by Michael S. White	Deputy Commander of the United States Fleet Forces Command; 2014–2015	Succeeded by Richard A. Brown
Preceded by Daniel Cloyd	Director of Maritime Operations of the United States Fleet Forces Command; 2015–2016	Succeeded by John D. Alexander
Preceded by Thomas K. Shannon	Commander of the Military Sealift Command; 2016–2019	Succeeded by Michael Wettlaufer
Preceded by John J. Broadmeadow	Deputy Commander of the United States Transportation Command; 2019–2022	Succeeded by John P. Sullivan
