= John J. Broadmeadow =

United States Marine Corps general

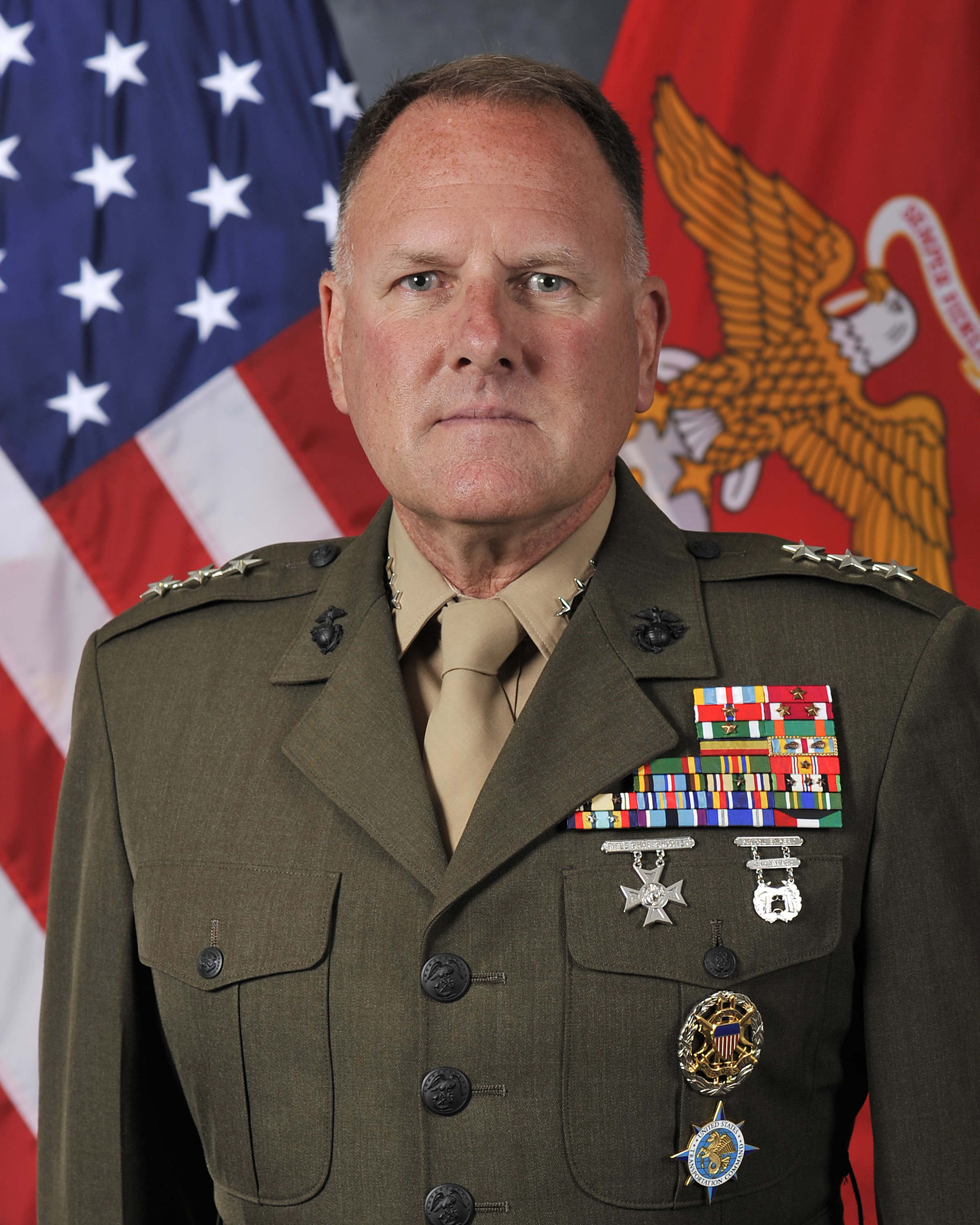
- Born: 1961 (age 64–65)
- Military career
- Allegiance: United States
- Branch: United States Marine Corps
- Service years: 1983–2020
- Rank: Lieutenant General
- Other work: President, Norwich University

John J. Broadmeadow (born 1961) is a retired lieutenant general in the United States Marine Corps, who served as Director of the Marine Corps Staff (DMCS) and was replaced by major general Gregg P. Olson in 2020. He previously served as the Deputy Commander of United States Transportation Command. Broadmeadow was commissioned upon graduating from Norwich University in 1983, and served as a member of the university's board of trustees before assuming office as the university's 25th president in 2024, and, officially inaugurated on Thursday, April 24, 2025.

Military offices
Preceded by Stephen R. Lyons	Deputy Commander of the United States Transportation Command; 2017–2019	Succeeded by Dee Mewbourne
