= Ottenbreit =

Ottenbreit or Ottenbrite is a surname. It is similar to Otterbein.

== List of people with the surname ==
- Anne Ottenbrite (born 1966), Canadian former breaststroke swimmer
- Greg Ottenbreit (born 1963), Canadian politician
