= Military Sealift Command =

United States Navy command for logistics

Coordinates: 36°56′39″N 76°16′38″W

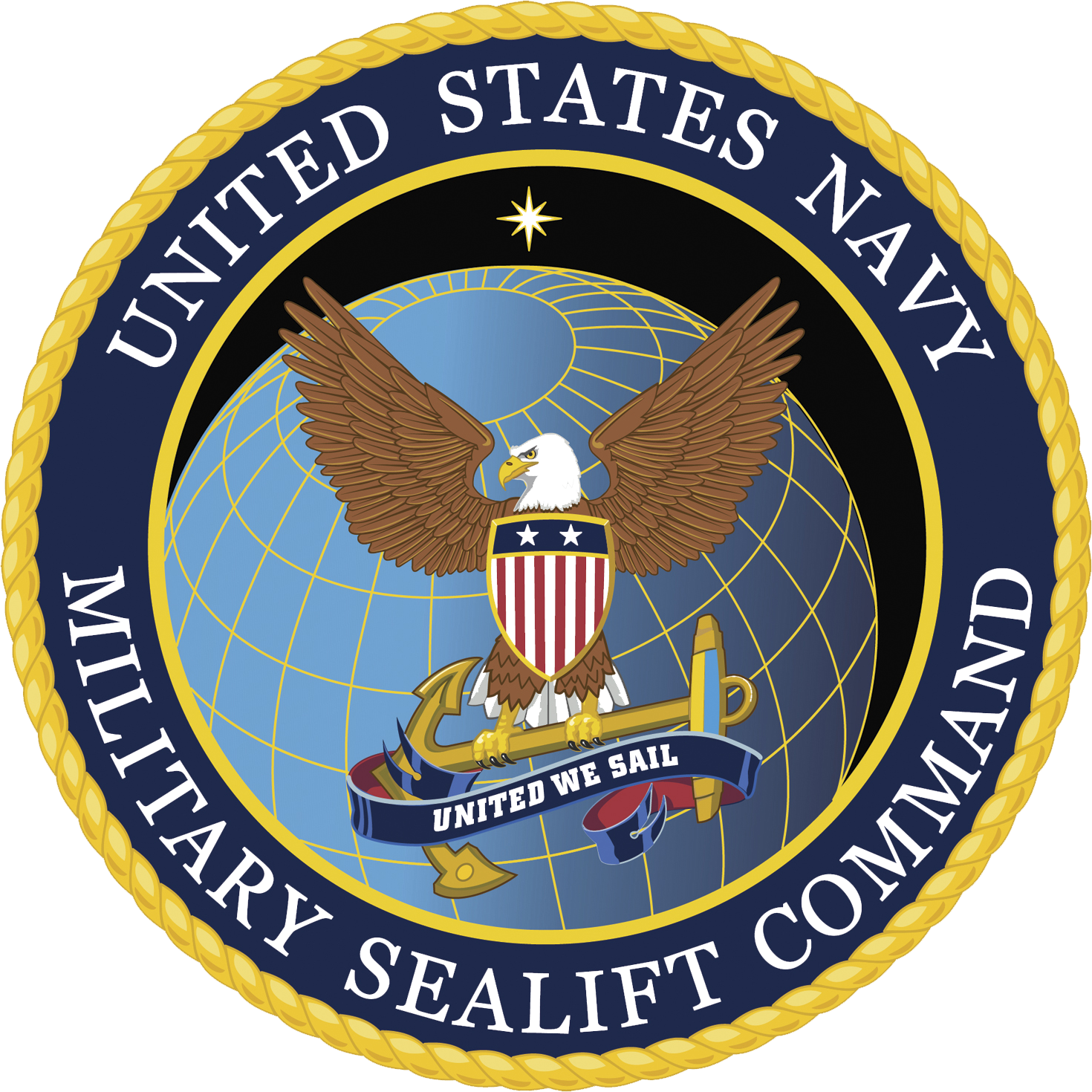
- The official seal of Military Sealift Command
- Active: 9 July 1949 – present
- Country: United States of America
- Branch: United States Navy
- Type: Component Command
- Role: Sea-based transportation
- Headquarters: Naval Station Norfolk, Norfolk, Virginia, U.S.

Commanders
- Current commander: RADM Philip E. Sobeck, USN; (8 Sept 2023 – present)

Insignia
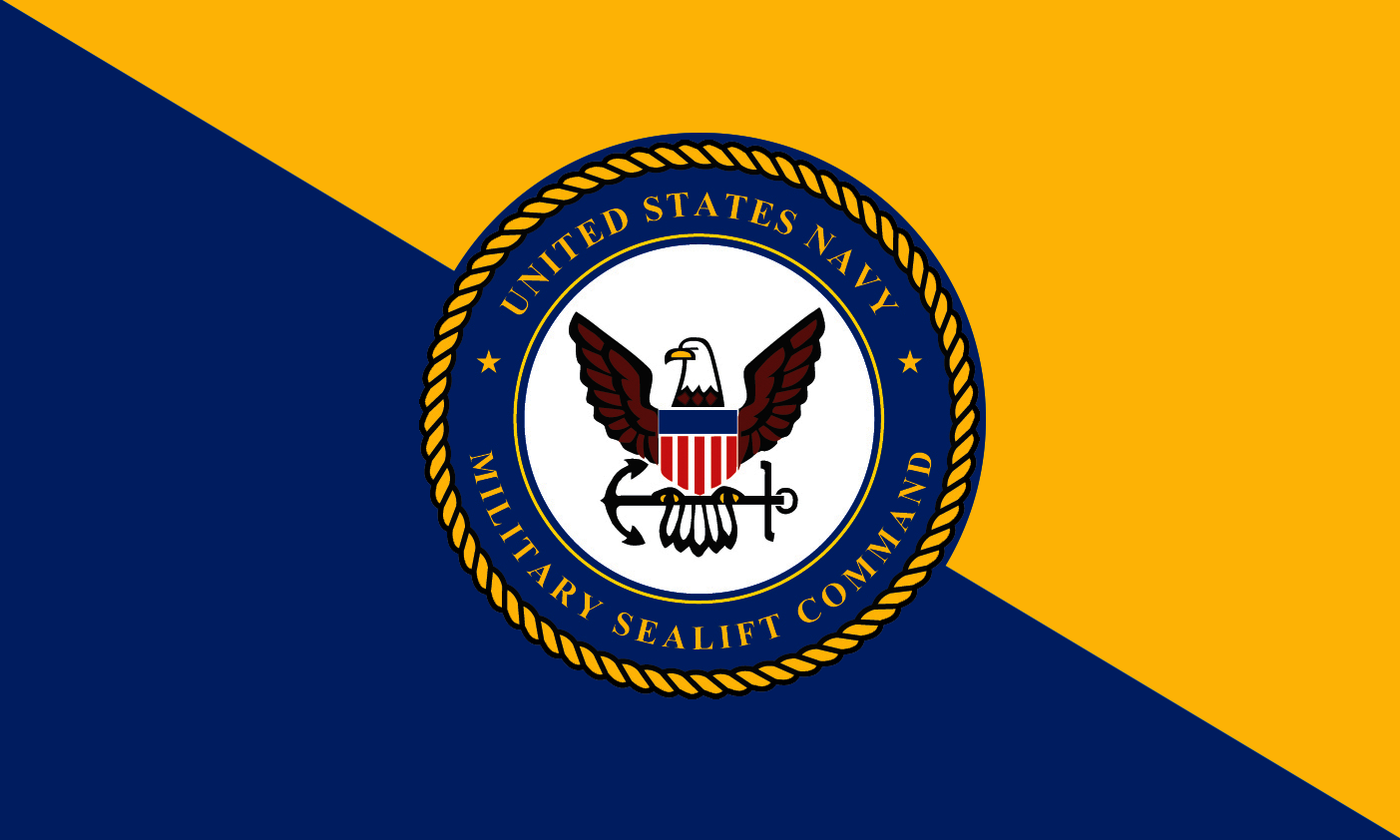
- Flag

The Military Sealift Command (MSC) is an organization that controls the replenishment and military transport ships of the United States Navy. Military Sealift Command has the responsibility for providing sealift and ocean transportation for all US military services as well as for other government agencies. It first came into existence on 9 July 1949 when the Military Sea Transportation Service (MSTS) became solely responsible for the Department of Defense's ocean transport needs. The MSTS was renamed the Military Sealift Command in 1970.

Military Sealift Command ships are made up of a core fleet of ships owned by the United States Navy and others under long-term-charter augmented by short-term or voyage-chartered ships.

- During a time charter MSC takes control of a merchant ship and operates it for the chartered amount of time. During this time the ship is crewed by civilian mariners and MSC pays for all expenses. Time chartered ships are not subject to inspections from foreign governments when in port, and MSC has operational control.
- Voyage chartered ships are crewed by civilian mariners, and MSC only pays the fee for transporting the cargo. These ships are chartered for the voyage, subject to inspections, and MSC does not have operational control of the ship.

The Navy-owned ships carry blue and gold stack colors, are in service with the prefix USNS (United States Naval Ship), rather than in commission (with a USS prefix), have hull numbers as an equivalent commissioned ship would have with the prefix T- and are primarily civilian crewed by either civil service mariners or contract crews (see United States Merchant Marine) as is the case of the special mission ships. Some ships may have Navy or Marine Corps personnel on board to carry out communication and special mission functions, or for force protection. Ships on charter or equivalent, retain commercial colors and bear the standard merchant prefix MV, SS, or GTS, without hull numbers.

Eight programs compose Military Sealift Command: Fleet Oiler (PM1), Special Mission (PM2), Strategic Sealift (PM3), Tow, Salvage, Tender, and Hospital Ship (PM4), Sealift (PM5), Combat Logistics Force (PM6), Expeditionary Mobile Base, Amphibious Command Ship, and Cable Layer (PM7) and Expeditionary Fast Transport (PM8).

MSC reports to the Department of Defense's Transportation Command for defense transportation matters, to the Navy Fleet Forces Command for Navy-unique matters, and to the assistant secretary of the Navy (Research, Development and Acquisition) for procurement policy and oversight matters.

== Command structure ==
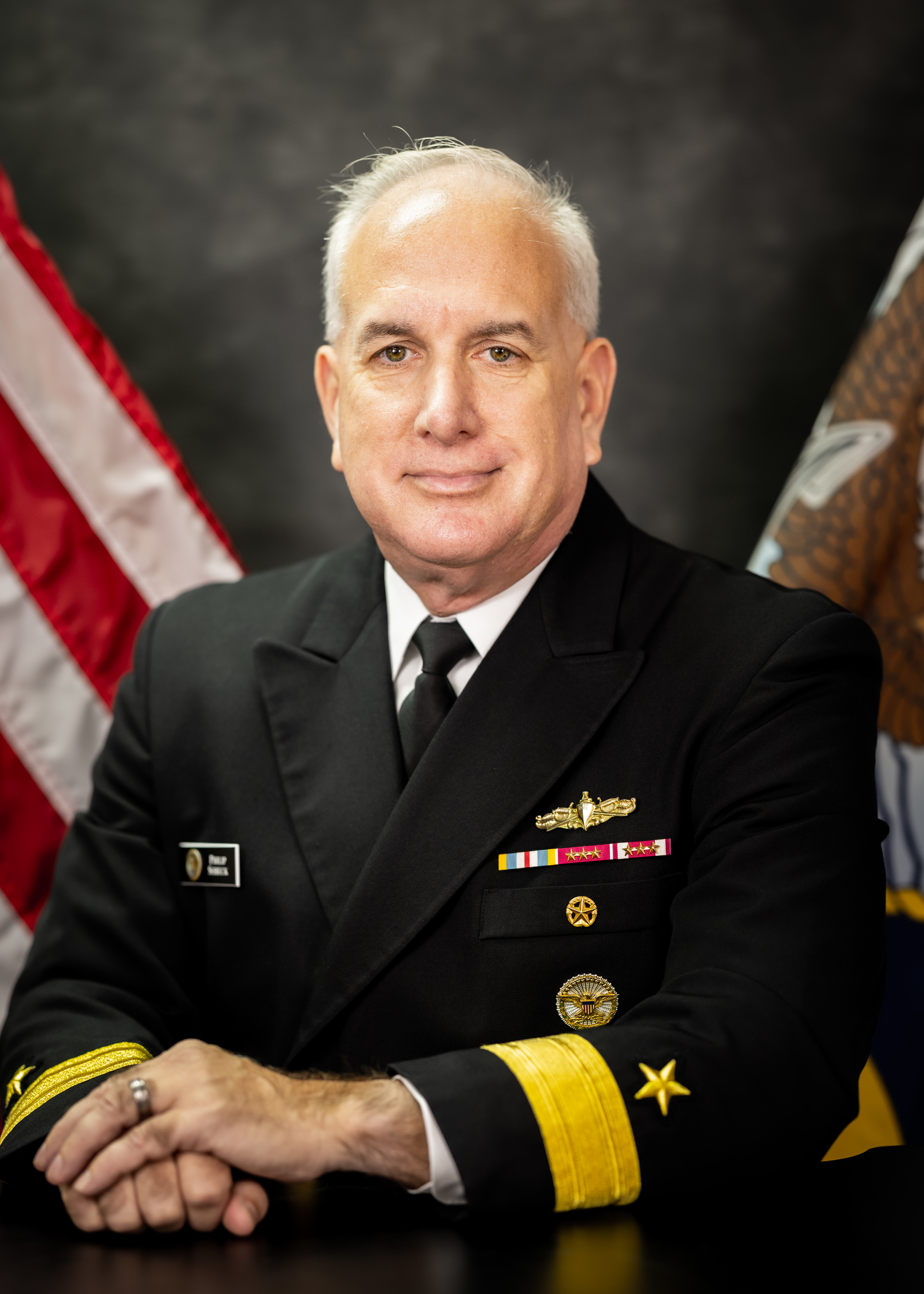
Rear Admiral Philip E. Sobeck, commander of Military Sealift Command.

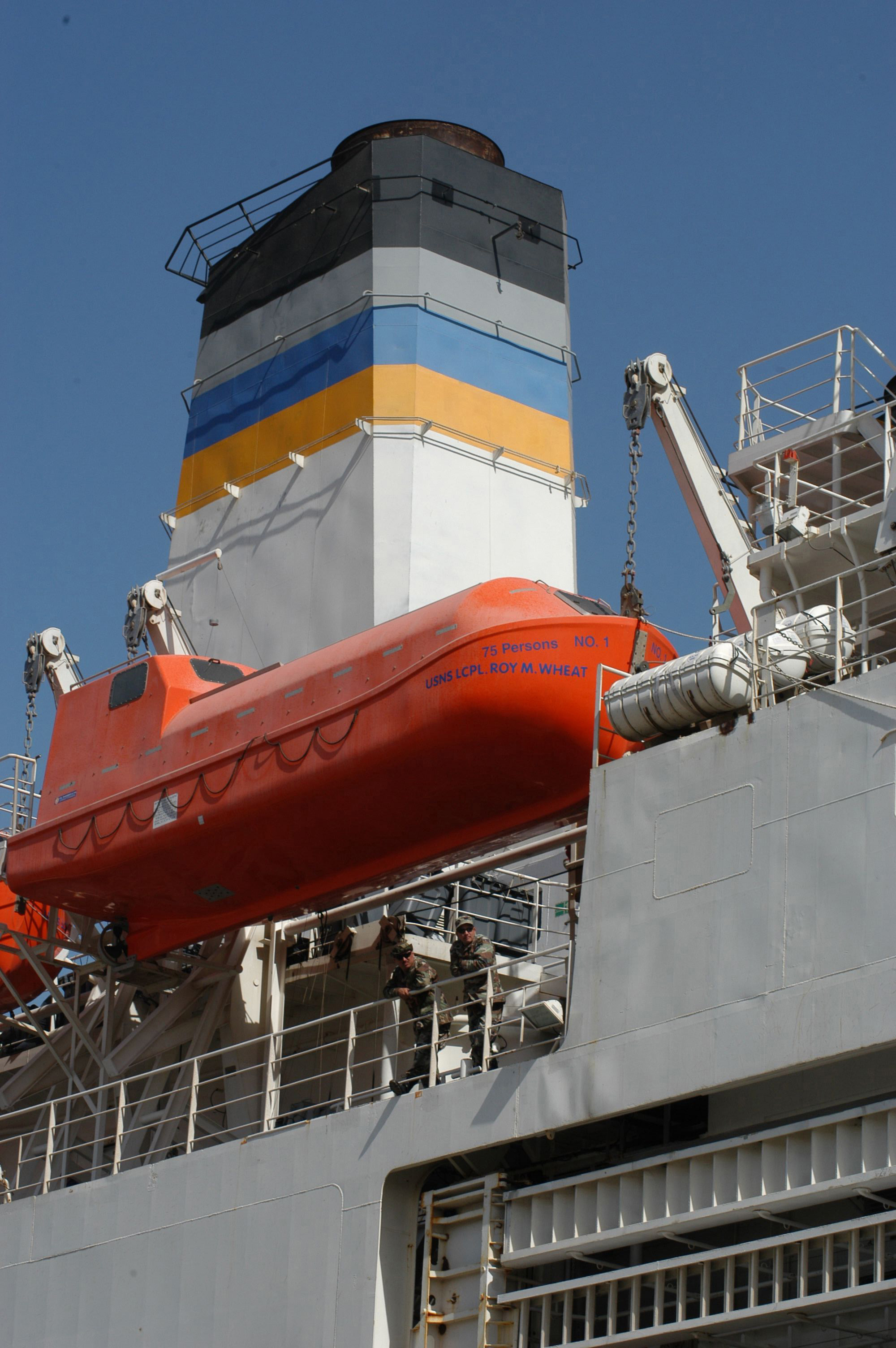
MSC ships are identified by the blue and gold stripes on their stacks.

Military Sealift Command ships as of January 2022

Military Sealift Command is organized around eight programs:

- Fleet Oiler Program N031 (formerly Combat Logistics Force (PM1) or Naval Fleet Auxiliary Force NFAF)
- Special Mission Program N032 (formerly (PM2))
- Strategic Sealift Program N033 (Formerly Prepositioning (PM3))
- Tow, Salvage, Tender, and Hospital Ship Program N034 (Formerly Service Support (PM4))
- Sealift Program N035 (Formerly Sealift (PM5))
- Combat Logistics Force Program N036 (Formerly Fleet Ordnance and Dry Cargo (PM6))
- Expeditionary Mobile Base, Amphibious Command Ship, and Cable Layer Program N037 (Formerly Afloat Staging Command Support (PM7))
- Expeditionary Fast Transport Program N038 (Formerly Joint High Speed Vessel (PM8))

On 9 January 2012, the MSC command organization was reorganized via a realignment of its structure to increase its efficiency while maintaining effectiveness. To better manage this new program structure, MSC repositioned three of its key Senior Executive Service (SES) personnel, with one SES acting as the program executive over MSC's government-operated ships, a second SES serving as the program executive over contract-operated ships, and a third SES overseeing total force manpower management for MSC worldwide operations. Also, MSC realigned two of its four mission-driven programs (Combat Logistics Force and Special Mission) and adding a fifth program (Service Support). The Prepositioning and Sealift programs are unchanged by the 2012 reorganization.

As of June 2013, Military Sealift Command operated around 110 ships, and employed 9,800 people (88% of whom are civilians).

In 2015, the Military Sealift Command underwent further restructuring with the relocation from the former headquarters at Washington Navy Yard to Naval Station Norfolk.

=== Fleet Oiler Program N031 ===
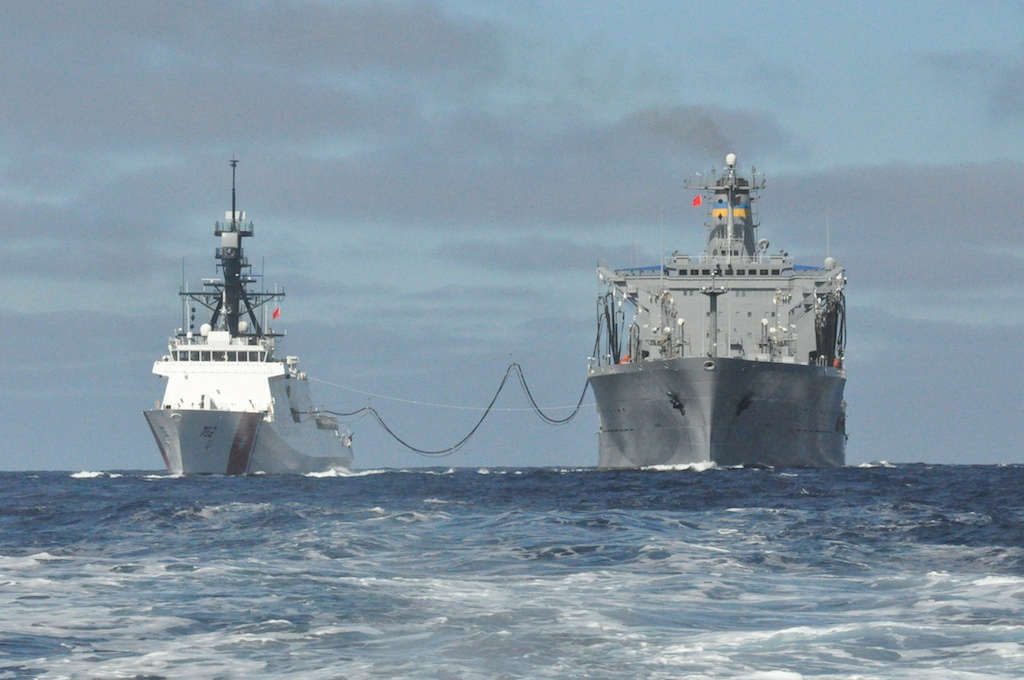
An Oiler conducts a replenishment-at-sea with USCGC Stratton, 2012

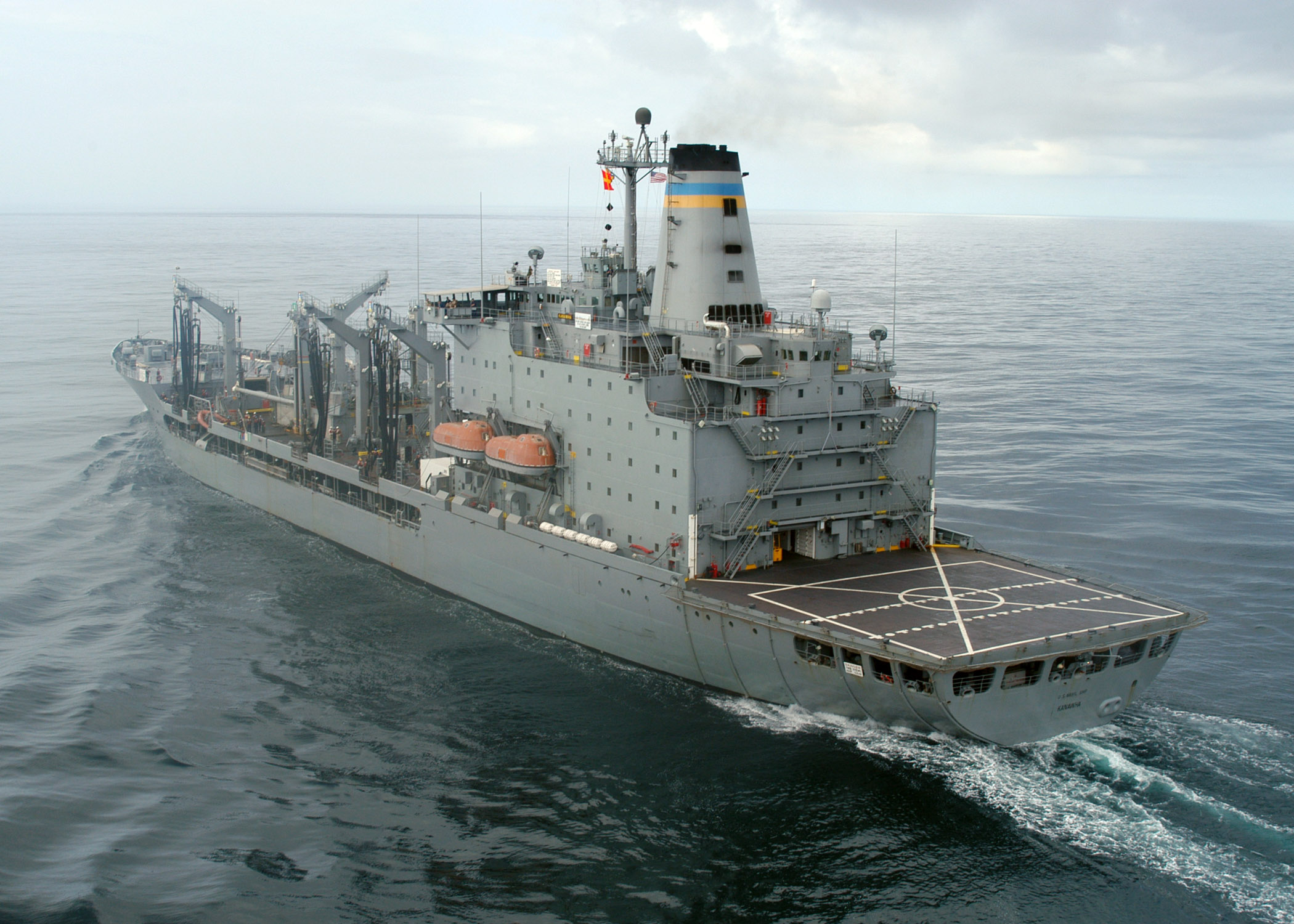
A Fleet Oiler (formerly the Naval Fleet Auxiliary Force) ship, USNS Kanawha, bearing the blue-and-gold stripes on its stack

The Combat Logistics Force was the part of the MSC most associated with directly supporting the Navy. In 1972, a study concluded that it would be cheaper for civilians to man USN support vessels such as tankers and stores ships. The CLF is the American equivalent of the British Royal Fleet Auxiliary. These MSC ships are painted haze gray and can be easily identified by the blue and gold horizontal bands around the top of their central smokestack.

The Combat Logistics Force was formerly called the Naval Fleet Auxiliary Force. After a 2012 reorganization, this program now maintains the 32 government-operated fleet underway replenishment ships from the former Naval Fleet Auxiliary Force (NFAF). Fleet replenishment oilers form the Oilers Program N031, while the dry cargo/ammunition ships and fast combat support ships were separated to Explosive Program N036.

Fleet Oiler Program ship types;

- Fleet Replenishment Oilers (T-AO) Henry J. Kaiser-class replenishment oiler
- Fleet Replenishment Oilers (T-AO) John Lewis-class replenishment oiler

=== Special Mission Program N032 ===
Military Sealift Command's Special Mission Program controls 24 ships that provide operating platforms and services for unique US Military and federal government missions. Oceanographic and hydrographic surveys, underwater surveillance, missile flight data collection and tracking, acoustic research and submarine support are among the specialized services this program supports. Special mission ships work for several different US Navy customers, including the Naval Sea Systems Command and the Oceanographer of the Navy. These ships like those of the NFAF are painted haze gray with blue and gold stack bands.

After a 2012 reorganization, this program now maintains all of its 24 contract-operated ships involved in missile range instrumentation, ocean surveillance, submarine and special warfare support, oceanographic survey, and navigation test support. Some of its ships were transferred to the new Service Support program.

Special Mission ship types;

- Missile Range Instrumentation Ship (T-AGM)
- Navigation Test Support Ship (T-AGS)
- Ocean Surveillance Ships (T-AGOS)
- Oceanographic Survey Ships (T-AGS)
- Submarine and Special Warfare Support (T-AGSE)
- Sea-based X-band Radar (SBX)

=== Strategic Sealift Program N033 ===
Military Sealift Command's Prepositioning Program is an element in the US's triad of power projection into the 21st century—sea shield, sea strike and sea basing. As a key element of sea basing, afloat prepositioning provides the military equipment and supplies for a contingency forward deployed in key ocean areas before need. Part of the prepositioning strategy is forward presence and power projection. Prepositioning extends the reach of operations, isolates conflicts away from the United States, allows for a swift response to conflict, and reduces time and resources delegated to transporting cargo. The MSC Prepositioning Program supports the US Army, Navy, Air Force and Marine Corps and the Defense Logistics Agency. Prepositioning ships remain at sea, ready to deploy on short-notice the vital equipment, fuel and supplies to initially support military forces in the event of a contingency. The Prepositioning Program consists of 34 at-sea ships plus two aviation support ships kept in reduced operating status. These ships wear civilian livery, and are only designated "USNS" if government-owned; those chartered from civilian owners are either "SS" or "MV". Two Dry Cargo/Ammunition Ships (T-AKE) are included in the program in a Reduced Operational Status (ROS).

Strategic Sealift Program ship types;

- Air Force Container Ships (T-AK)
- Army Container Ships (T-AK)
- Dry Cargo/Ammunition Ships (T-AKE)
- Aviation Logistics Support Ship (T-AVB)
- Break-Bulk Ships (T-AK)
- Large, Medium-Speed, Roll-On/Roll-Off Ships (T-AKR)
- Marine Corps Container and Roll-On/Roll-Off Ships (T-AK/T-AKR)
- Expeditionary Transfer Dock (T-ESD)

=== Tow, Salvage, Tender, and Hospital Ship Program N034 ===
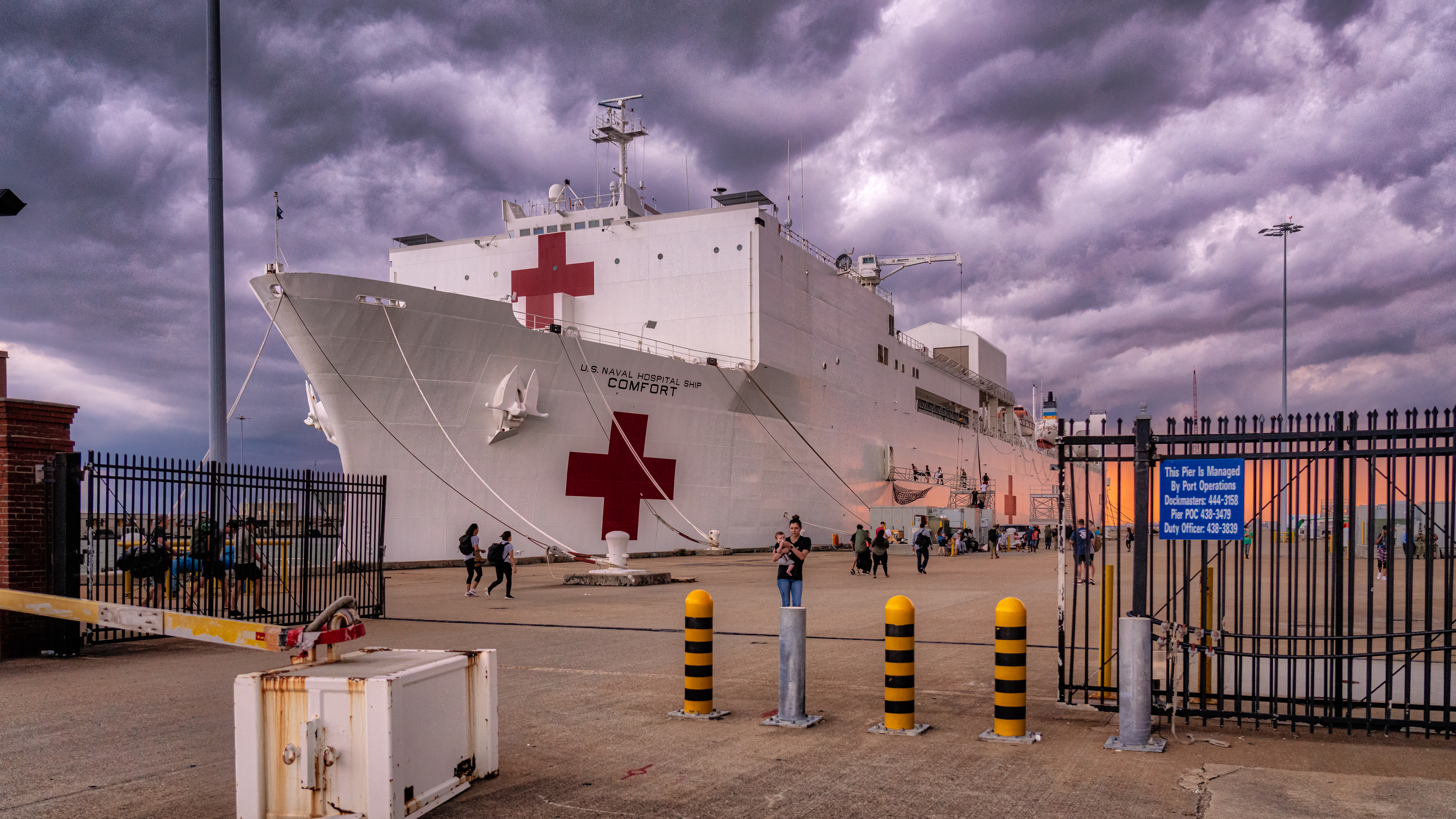
USNS Comfort (T-AH-20)

Formerly Service Support (PM4) it consists of fleet ocean tugs, rescue and salvage ships, submarines tenders, and hospital ships formerly from the NFAF. Command ships and cable layers were transferred to the N037 program.

Service Support ship types;

- Fleet Ocean Tugs (T-ATF)
- Rescue/Salvage Ships (T-ARS)
- Submarine Tender (AS)
- Hospital Ships (T-AH)

=== Sealift Program N035 ===
The mission of the Sealift Program is to provide ocean transportation to the Department of Defense by meeting its sealift requirements in peace, contingency, and war with quality, efficient cost effective assets and centralized management. This is achieved through the use of commercial charter vessels, Large, Medium-Speed Roll-on/Roll-off ships, and the Maritime Administration's Ready Reserve Force, including the eight former MSC fast sealift ships. Sealift is divided into three separate project offices: Tanker Project Office, Dry Cargo Project Office and the Surge Project Office.

Sealift Program Ship Types;

- Dry Cargo Ships (T-AK)
- Large, Medium-Speed, Roll-On/Roll-Off Ships (T-AKR)
- Tankers (T-AOT)

=== Combat Logistics Force Program N036 ===
Formerly the Fleet Ordnance and Dry Cargo (PM6), it is composed of twelve Dry Cargo/Ammunition ships and two Fast Combat Support ships. Dry Cargo and Ammunition ships, or T-AKEs, were designed to replenish dry and refrigerated stores as well as ordnance. They have replaced combat stores ships and ammunition ships incorporating the capabilities of both platforms into one hull. These multi-product ships increase the delivery capability to provide food, fuel, spare parts, ammunition and potable water to the U.S. Navy and allies' ships. Fast Combat Support Ships or T-AOEs provide parts, supplies and fuel at sea.

Combat Logistics Force Ship Types;

- Dry Cargo/Ammunition Ships (T-AKE)
- Fast Combat Supply (T-AOE)

=== Expeditionary Mobile Base, Amphibious Command Ship, and Cable Layer Program N037 ===
Formerly the Afloat Staging Command Support (PM7) program, it is composed of the Expeditionary Mobile Base ships (replacement for the Afloat Forward Staging Base), the Amphibious Command Ship Mount Whitney, and the cable layer Zeus.

Afloat Staging Command Support Program Ship Types;

- Expeditionary Mobile Base (ESB) – (ESD subvariant)
- Amphibious command ship (LCC)
- Cable layer (T-ARC)

=== Expeditionary Fast Transport Program N038 ===
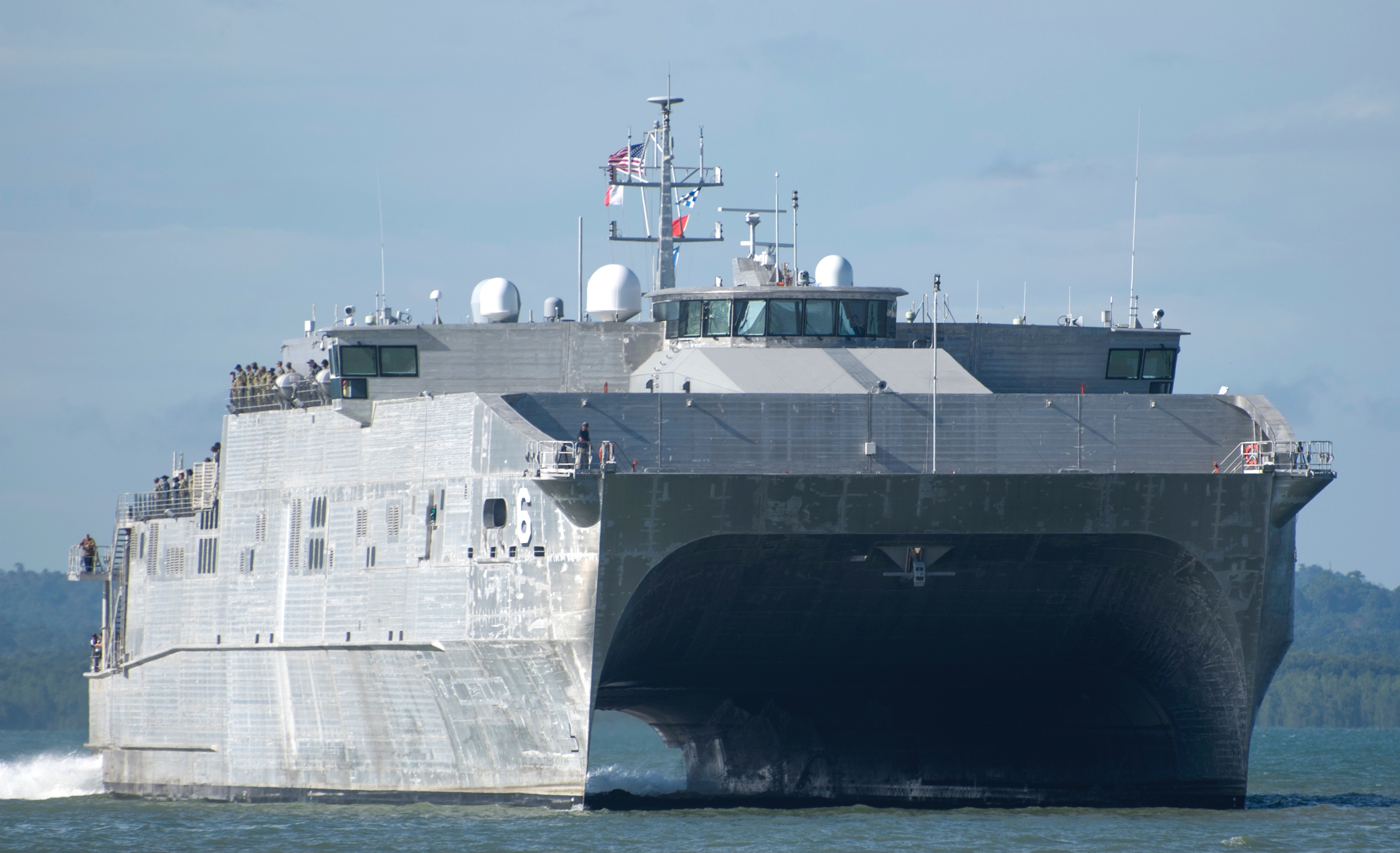
USNS Brunswick (T-EPF-6)

This consists of the class of ships formerly known as the Joint High Speed Vessel (JHSV) program but was changed to (EPF) in September 2015. The Expeditionary Fast Transport (EPF) program is a cooperative effort for a high-speed, shallow draft vessel intended for rapid intratheater transport of medium-sized cargo payloads. The EPF will reach speeds of 35–45 knots (65–83 km/h; 40–52 mph) and will allow for the rapid transit and deployment of conventional or special forces as well as equipment and supplies.

Expeditionary Fast Transport Program Ship Types;

- Expeditionary Fast Transport [formerly Joint High Speed Vessel (JHSV)

== Area commands ==
MSC headquarters is located at Naval Station Norfolk in Norfolk, VA. As a result of a 2012 organization, MSC's 12 worldwide MSC ship support units (SSUs) will now report to the MSC operational area commands in their respective areas of responsibility. These are responsible for crewing, training, equipping and maintaining MSC's government-owned, government-operated ships.

- MSC Atlantic in Norfolk. In October 2013, the MSCLANT Task Force Designator changed from CTF-23 to CTF-83. Missions, functions and tasks remained unchanged.
- MSC Pacific in San Diego
- MSC Europe & Africa in Naples
- MSC Central in Bahrain
- MSC Far East in Singapore

Formerly, these SSUs had reported to MSC's Military Sealift Fleet Support Command (MSFSC), a subordinate command of Military Sealift Command and is a single Type Commander (TYCOM) execution command having worldwide responsibility to crew, train, equip and maintain MSC government-owned, government-operated ships. MSFSC officially stood up on 13 November 2005. Stand up of the Ship Support Units (SSUs) followed establishment of MSFSC, their parent command. SSU San Diego stood up in conjunction with MSFSC. By late 2008, all subordinate SSUs were fully operational.

MSFSC was formed from the following MSC elements: Portions of Sealift Logistics Command Atlantic and the former Naval Fleet Auxiliary Force East; Portions of Sealift Logistics Command Pacific; Naval Fleet Auxiliary Force West (except those positions remaining in SSU San Diego); and The Afloat Personnel Management Center.

MSFSC was also responsible for providing support to other MSC assets as directed. MSFSC has ship support units, or SSUs, in Naples, Bahrain, Singapore, Guam, Yokohama and San Diego. The SSUs (except for Guam and Yokohama) are collocated with their respective numbered fleet operational logistics task force commanders and Sealift Logistics Commands, but are not within that chain of command. SSUs provide local TYCOM support to ships in their area of operations and report directly to MSFSC. MSFSC was disestablished following restructuring when Military Sealift Command relocated to Naval Station Norfolk from the Washington Navy Yard.

Sealift's capabilities are significantly hampered by biofouling. Maintenance is sometimes performed to remove fouling, but sealift maintenance must follow the Uniform National Discharge Standards for the chemicals used in this process.

== History ==
=== Military sea transportation prior to 1949 ===
As early as 1847, both the U.S. Army and U.S. Navy chartered American merchant ships separately. Following the Mexican–American War, Brigadier General Thomas S. Jesup, Quartermaster of the Army, recommended that the Navy be given responsibility for all water transportation requirements for the military. However, each service managed their own sea transportation throughout the nineteenth century and both World Wars.

In World War II, four government agencies conducted military sealift functions, the Naval Overseas Transportation Service (NOTS), the Army Transport Service, the U.S. Maritime Commission's War Shipping Administration, and the Fleet Support Services. To oversee these organizations, the Joint Chiefs of Staff (JCS) established the Joint Military Transportation Command.

=== Military Sea Transportation Service ===
On 15 December 1948, the Secretary of Defense James Forrestal issued a statement, "all military sea transport including Army transports would be placed under Navy command." Issues with funding held up the transfer of the functions to the Navy. The new Secretary of Defense, Louis Johnson, issued a memorandum on 12 July 1949 that detailed service responsibilities and the funding of the new Military Sea Transportation Service (MSTS).

MSTS became the single managing agency for the Department of Defense's ocean transportation needs. The command assumed responsibility for providing sealift and ocean transportation for all military services as well as for other government agencies. The new command set up subcomponents, for example, Military Sea Transportation Service Pacific (ComMSTSPac).

Nine months after its creation, MSTS responded to the challenge of the Korean War. On 6 July 1950, eleven days after the initial invasion of South Korea by North Korean troops, MSTS deployed the 24th Infantry Division for duty in Japan to Pusan, South Korea. In addition to transporting troops and combat equipment to and from Korea, command ships supplied US bases and Distant Early Warning line construction sites and supported US nation building efforts from Europe and Africa, to the Far East.

The 1960s brought the conflict in Southeast Asia. From 1965 to 1969 MSTS moved almost 54 million tons of combat equipment and supplies and almost 8 million long tons of fuel to South Vietnam. The Vietnam War era also marked the last use of MSC troop ships for personnel movement. Currently, most US troops are prepositioned by air.

=== Military Sealift Command ===
MSTS was renamed Military Sealift Command (MSC) in 1970. In 1971 Chief of Naval Operations Admiral Elmo Zumwalt proposed the use of MSC ships for direct support of the fleet at sea. Heretofore, these civilian-crewed ships had only been used for point to point transport of cargo. To determine the feasibility of this concept, Admiral Zumwalt directed the formation of a special study group to recommend how the navy could better utilize the MSC fleet to save both manpower and money. The high cost of training personnel after the advent of the all-volunteer navy made it imperative that seagoing personnel be assigned to complex warships of the fleet whenever possible. The study concluded that significant savings could be achieved if civilian mariners could be substituted for uniformed navy sailors in fleet support ships.

In 1972 a joint U.S. Navy-Maritime Administration project called "Charger Log" was established to test whether or not a union-crewed merchant ship could provide some or all of the fleet support services normally provided by navy oilers. Extensive trials were conducted using the civilian crewed merchant tanker SS Erna Elizabeth equipped with both alongside and astern fueling gear to test the feasibility of augmenting (not replacing) the service force with ships of the U.S. Merchant Marine. The success of 'Charger Log' contributed to the formation of the Naval Fleet Auxiliary Force.

The navy oiler USS Taluga (AO-62) was the first fleet-support ship to be placed under MSC control. Decommissioned on 4 May 1972, she was transferred to the MSC and redesignated T-AO-62. After its transfer, the ship underwent a thorough overhaul that included refurbishment of equipment, gear, and refueling rigs, modification of crew quarters, and the removal of armaments. She entered service with a crew of 105 civilian mariners hired by the government augmented by a sixteen-member naval complement.

The shortage of multiproduct replenishment ships in the early 1970s led to the development of an improvised system for dispensing fuel from ammunition and stores ships that allowed them to transfer fuel to smaller combatants. Neither type of ship had cargo fuel, but each could share its own fuel with destroyers and frigates in an emergency. The lack of sufficient numbers of AOEs or AORs precluded the deployment of these types in support of any of the surface warfare groups, which were generally composed of destroyers and frigates. The old saying that necessity is the mother of invention proved to be true when Rear Admiral John Johnson devised a practical solution to the shortage of fuel-carrying UNREP ships based on the modification of existing cargo transfer gear on ammunition and stores ships. As commander Task Force 73 (the service force of the Seventh Fleet) in 1973, Admiral Johnson had to contend with the problem of how to provide logistic support for the two Seventh Fleet destroyers deployed to the Indian Ocean for an extended period of time. The answer was to turn the USS Kiska (AE-35) into a mini multiproduct ship by adding two cargo reefer boxes as deck cargo and outfitting it with a jury-rigged fuel station. The latter was achieved by temporarily rigging a 7-inch fuel hose to the starboard side cargo station—the one closest to the ship's fuel receiving raiser. The highline was used as a span wire, and fuel hose saddles were supported from a wire whip from a nearby hauling winch or a fiber whip from a nearby gypsy. Fuel was pumped from the ship's own fuel bunkers to the receiving ship alongside using the fuel-transfer pump normally carried aboard the AE. The pumping rate was considerably less than that of a fleet oiler and, while workable, contained many drawbacks.

By the time the USNS Henry J. Kaiser (T-AO-187) entered service on 19 December 1986, the Navy had transferred the five Second World War vintage tankers of the Mispillion class and the six 1950s-built Neosho-class fleet oilers to the Military Sealift Command.

Through the 1970s and 1980s MSC provided the Department of Defense with ocean transportation. During the first Persian Gulf War, consisting of Operation Desert Shield and Operation Desert Storm, MSC distinguished itself as the largest source of defense transportation of any nation involved. Command resources delivered more than 12 million tons (11 million metric tonnes) of wheeled and tracked vehicles, helicopters, ammunition, dry cargo, fuel and other supplies and equipment during the war. At the high point of the war, more than 230 government-owned and chartered ships delivered the largest part of the international arsenal that defeated Saddam Hussein in Iraq. MSC was also involved in the 2003 invasion of Iraq, delivering 61,000,000 square feet (5.7 km^{2}) of cargo and 1,100,000,000 US gallons (4,200,000 m^{3}) of fuel by the end of the first year.

In August 2017, the Government Accountability Office issued a report detailing readiness issues that limited at-sea mission capabilities, prompting an investigation from the Department of Defense's Inspector General.

== List of commanders ==
No.	Commander		Term		
No.	Portrait	Name	Took office	Left office	Term length
17	Michael P. Kalleres	Vice Admiral; Michael P. Kalleres (1939–2010)	August 1992	August 1994	~2 years, 0 days
18	Philip M. Quast	Vice Admiral; Philip M. Quast (1939–2019)	August 1994	February 1997	~2 years, 184 days
19	James B. Perkins III	Vice Admiral; James B. Perkins III (1942–2021)	February 1997	February 1999	~2 years, 0 days
20	Gordon S. Holder	Vice Admiral; Gordon S. Holder (born 1946)	February 1999	30 August 2001	~2 years, 210 days
21	David L. Brewer III	Vice Admiral; David L. Brewer III (born 1946)	30 August 2001	10 March 2006	4 years, 192 days
22	Robert D. Reilly Jr.	Rear Admiral; Robert D. Reilly Jr. (born 1953)	10 March 2006	16 October 2009	3 years, 220 days
23	Mark H. Buzby	Rear Admiral; Mark H. Buzby (born 1956)	16 October 2009	10 May 2013	3 years, 206 days
24	Thomas K. Shannon	Rear Admiral; Thomas K. Shannon (born 1960)	10 May 2013	25 August 2016	3 years, 107 days
25	Dee L. Mewbourne	Rear Admiral; Dee L. Mewbourne (born 1961)	25 August 2016	28 June 2019	2 years, 307 days
26	Michael A. Wettlaufer	Rear Admiral; Michael A. Wettlaufer (born c. 1960)	28 June 2019	8 September 2023	4 years, 72 days
27	Philip E. Sobeck	Rear Admiral (lower half); Philip E. Sobeck	8 September 2023	Incumbent	3 years, 68 days

== Notable ships ==
Historically, Military Sealift Command operated former ships of the U.S. Navy, which upon decommissioning changes prefixes from United States Ship (USS) to United States Naval Ship (USNS). In rare instances, ships were transferred from MSC to the U.S. Navy, being commissioned and receiving the USS-prefix.

- USNS Point Barrow (T-AKD-1) was launched in 1957 and delivered to the Military Sea Transportation Service as a Cargo Ship Dock. She was later extensively modified and in 1974 reclassified a "Deep Submergence Support Ship" and renamed USS Point Loma (AGDS-2).
- USNS Lewis B. Puller (T-ESB 3) is the first purpose-built Expeditionary Mobile Base (previously Mobile Landing Platform, then Afloat Forward Staging Base) vessel for the United States Navy. She was delivered to Military Sealift Command in 2015, then later commissioned on 17 August 2017 in Bahrain, with her prefix changing from USNS to USS and her hull designation changing from T-ESB-3 to ESB-3.[10] She is the first overseas commissioning of a U.S. Navy warship.
- USS Coronado (AGF-11) was an Austin-class amphibious transport dock (LPD) commissioned in 1970 fitted with an additional superstructure level for command ship duties. In 2003 she was decommissioned, re-designated as USNS Coronado (T-AGF-11) with the intention of being operated by a civilian MSC crew. It was concluded shortly thereafter that the operations the ship engaged in required her to be a USS warship and thus she was transferred back to the Navy and recommissioned. She was finally decommissioned for the last time in 2006 and was later used for a SINKEX in 2012.
- USS Ponce (AFSB(I)-15) was an Austin-class amphibious transport dock (LPD) commissioned in 1971, and was planned for decommissioning in 2012, but was converted at short notice into the Afloat Forward Staging Base and operated by Military Sealift Command. She was relieved by the USNS Lewis B. Puller (T-ESB-3) in 2017, after which she was finally retired after 46 years of service.
- USS Card (CVE-11) was a Bogue-class escort aircraft carrier laid down in 1941 as a C-3 cargo ship, then acquired from the Maritime Commission while under construction and converted into an escort carrier, and decommissioned after World War 2. In 1958 she was placed into service with Military Sea Transportation Service as a civilian aircraft transport and later sunk pierside after being attacked by the Viet Cong in the Vietnam War, killing five civilian crew members.
- USS Taluga (AO-62) was a Cimarron-class fleet oiler acquired by the U.S. Navy during World War II. In 1972 she was decommissioned and turned over to the Military Sealift Command for civilian operation as USNS Taluga (T-AO-62) in a then-experimental use of the Military Sea Transportation Service's ability.
- USNS LCPL Roy M. Wheat (T-AK-3016) was originally launched in 1987 by the Black Sea Shipyard in Mykolaiv, Ukrainian SSSR as the GTS Vladimir Vaslyayev, she was acquired in 1997 by the US Navy and began conversion in 2001 for transfer to the Military Sealift Command, in 2003 this conversion was completed and she was renamed in honor of US Marine and Medal of Honor recipient Roy M. Wheat. The conversion process included a 118 ft midbody hull extension, the installation of two cargo cranes, installation of fore and aft garages, strengthening and increasing the length of the stern ramp, a stern helicopter deck, conversion of the electrical system from 50 Hz to 60 Hz, the replacement of the ship's generator and electrical switching gear replacement, new Vosper-Thornycroft machinery control systems, new and larger accommodations, and climate control systems for the cargo holds. LCPL Roy M. Wheat left service and was struck 30 December 2021

== See also ==
- United States Merchant Marine
- U.S. Merchant Marine Academy
- Royal Fleet Auxiliary
- El Faro
- Loss of Strength Gradient
- Power projection
- Seabasing
- Sealift

Comparable organizations

- United States Transportation Command
- U.S. Army Transportation Command
- Air Mobility Command (U.S. Air Force)
