= Thomas Otterbein =

American (U.S.) Navy captain

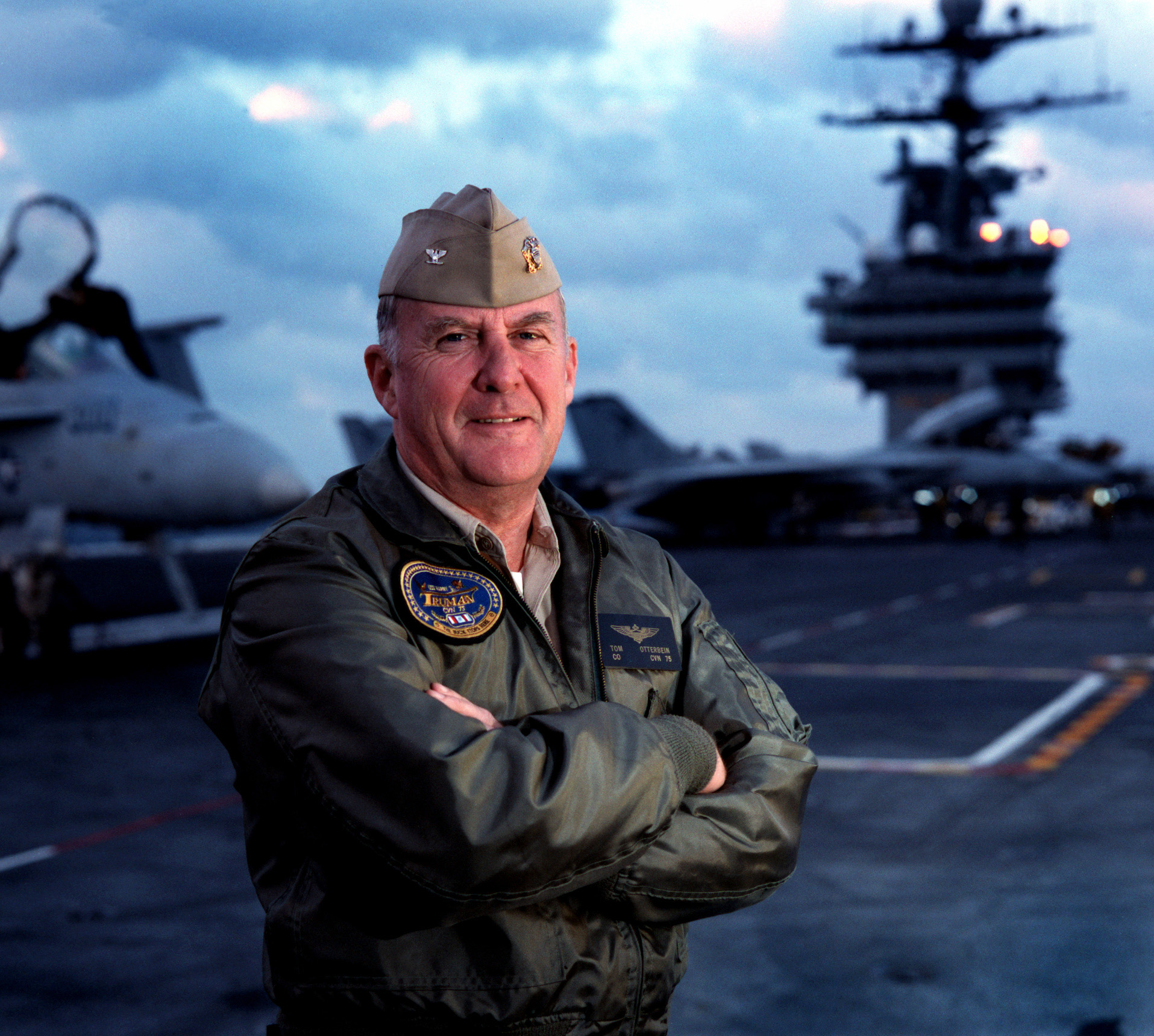
US Navy Captain Thomas G. Otterbein, first Commanding Officer of the nuclear powered aircraft carrier USS Harry S. Truman (CVN 75).

Thomas G. Otterbein is a retired captain of the United States Navy. A naval aviator, he held important aviation-related commands both at sea and on shore, including a stint as Executive Officer and acting Commanding Officer of the Navy Fighter Weapons School (TOPGUN).

== Early life and career ==
Otterbein was born in Bad Axe, Michigan. He entered the United States Naval Academy and graduated in 1970. After receiving his commission, he completed flight training and was designated a Naval Aviator in 1973.

His first operational tour was with VF-111 flying the F-4 Phantom II, where he made deployments to the Mediterranean Sea and western Pacific Ocean aboard USS Franklin D. Roosevelt and USS Kitty Hawk respectively. Upon completion of F-14 Tomcat training, his next sea tour was with Fighter Squadron 51, where he made an around the world cruise aboard USS Carl Vinson. In recognition of his superior aeronautical skills and leadership abilities, Captain Otterbein was selected for F/A-18 Hornet training and subsequently became the Executive Officer of Fighter Squadron 161 aboard USS Midway. Following that tour, he was the Executive Officer of Fighter Squadron 195 and had command of that squadron for eighteen months.

Captain Otterbein successfully completed Nuclear Power Training and was soon back in the fleet, serving as Executive Officer of USS Theodore Roosevelt. He subsequently assumed command of USS Nashville and led the ship through Operations Support/Uphold Democracy in Haiti, earning the Armed Forces Expeditionary Medal and Battle "E" award. The crowning achievement of his career came when he reported as Commanding Officer, USS Harry S. Truman.

== Retirement ==
Thomas Otterbein worked ten years for Sperry Corporation and Northrop Grumman Corporation providing navigation equipment and software for military and commercial use. Otterbein resides in Charlottesville, Virginia.
