= Thomas K. Shannon =

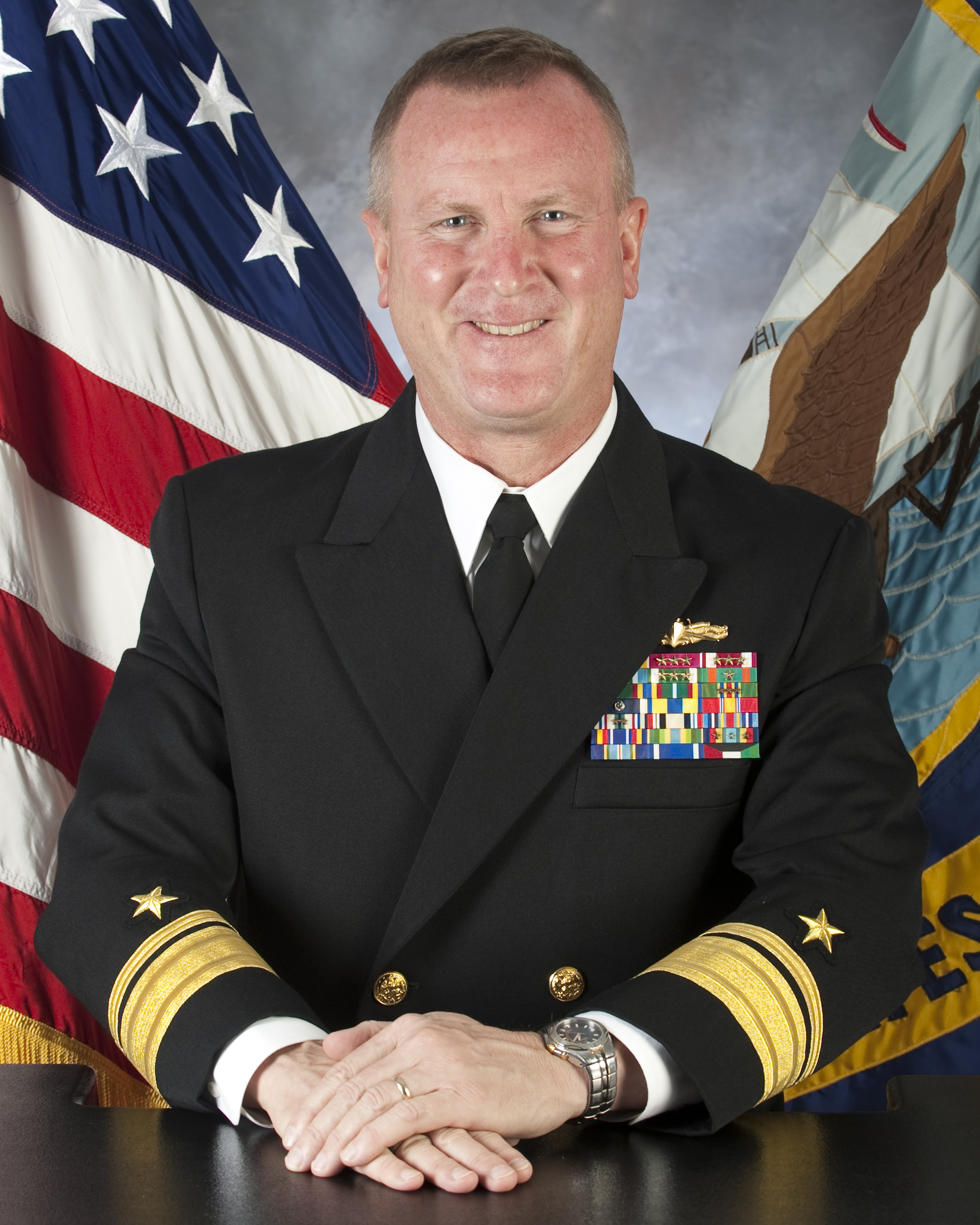
- Rear Admiral Thomas K. Shannon (USN)
- Born: 1960 (age 65–66)
- Military career
- Allegiance: United States of America
- Branch: United States Navy
- Service years: 1982–2016
- Rank: Rear admiral
- Commands: Military Sealift Command; Carrier Strike Group One; USS Vicksburg (CG-69); USS De Wert (FFG-45)
- Awards: Defense Superior Service Medal; Legion of Merit (4); Meritorious Service Medal

Rear Admiral (United States) Thomas Kennedy Shannon (USN) (born 1960) is a retired naval officer. His final assignment was as commander of the US Navy Military Sealift Command.

== Education ==
Shannon graduated with a BS in Nautical Science from the Maine Maritime Academy (1982) and was commissioned an ensign in the US Navy through the Naval Reserve Officers Training Corps program. He later received an MA in National Security and Strategic Studies from the Naval War College in March 1998.

== Career ==
After his commissioning, Shannon held various US naval commands of increasing responsibility, including in succession chief staff officer of Destroyer Squadron 14, surface operations officer of Cruiser-Destroyer Group Twelve, commanding officer of the USS De Wert (FFG-45), commanding officer of the USS Vicksburg (CG-69), air defense commander for the USS John F. Kennedy (CV-67) battle group, and commander of Carrier Strike Group 1. Shannon was then in the year 2012 promoted from the rank of rear admiral (lower half) to rear admiral, before being relieved of command of Carrier Strike Group 1 and named commander, Military Sealift Command in the year 2013. He completed this assignment on 25 August 2016 when he was relieved by Rear Adm. Dee L. Mewbourne and subsequently retired from the navy.

== Medals and decorations ==
Among the rear admiral's military decorations and awards are prominently:

Defense Superior Service Medal
Legion of Merit with 3 oak leaf clusters
Meritorious Service Medal
