= Amy Bauernschmidt =

United States Navy officer

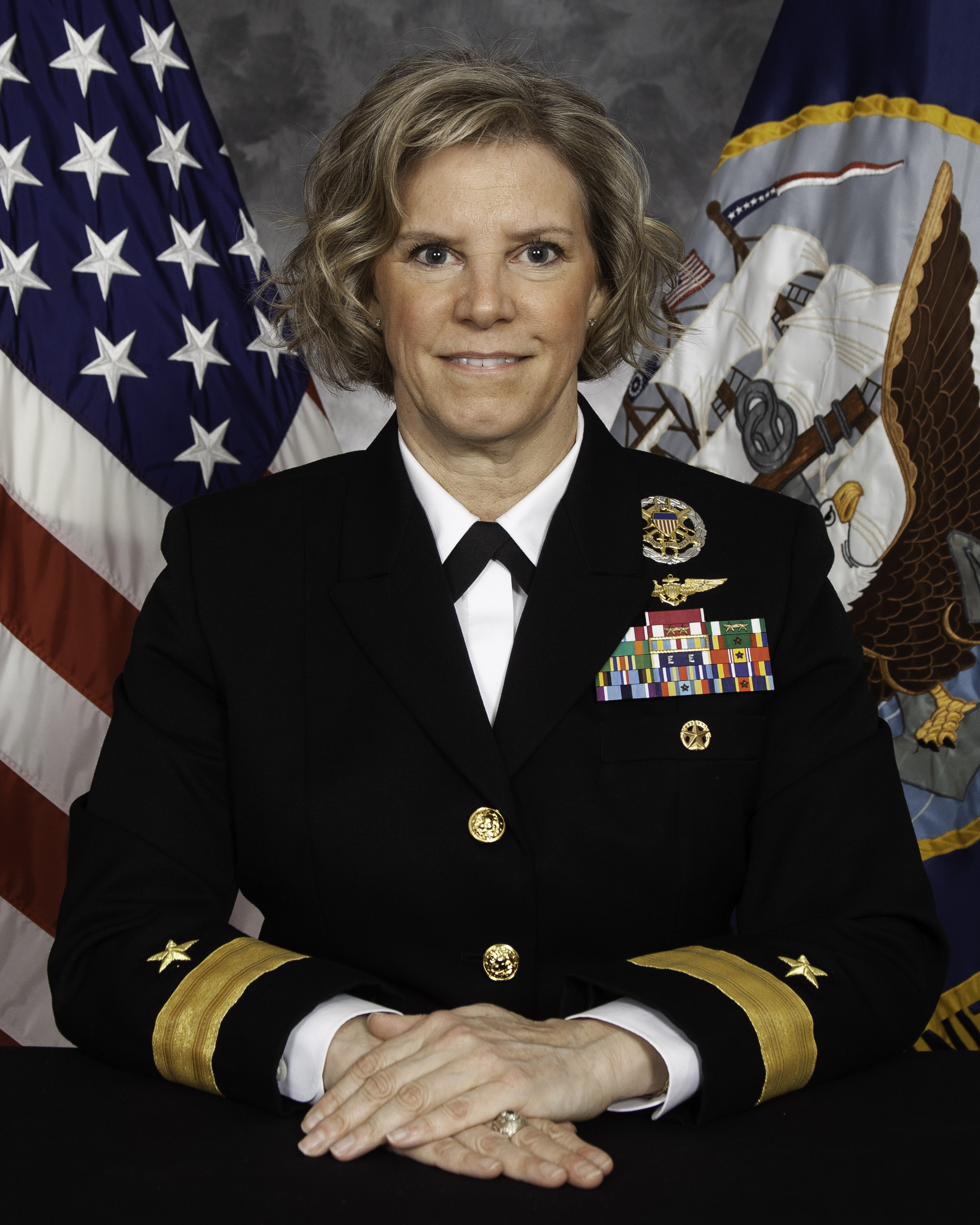
- Allegiance: United States
- Branch: United States Navy
- Service years: 1994–present
- Rank: Rear Admiral (lower half)
- Commands: Carrier Strike Group 1; USS Abraham Lincoln; USS San Diego; HSM-70
- Awards: Legion of Merit; Defense Superior Service Medal; Meritorious Service Medal; Naval Medal of Honor for Merit (Peru)

Amy N. Bauernschmidt is a United States Navy rear admiral, currently serving as Director of Maritime Operations, U.S. Pacific Fleet.

She was the first woman to serve as commanding officer of a U.S. Navy aircraft carrier when she assumed command of USS Abraham Lincoln (CVN-72) on 19 August 2021.

Previously, Bauernschmidt had been the first female executive officer of a U.S. aircraft carrier, serving aboard the same vessel.

== Early life and education ==
Bauernschmidt was raised in Milwaukee, Wisconsin and attended the United States Naval Academy. Six months before she graduated, the U.S. Congress passed legislation allowing women to serve on Navy combatant ships. She graduated in May 1994 with a B.S. degree in ocean engineering. On her first assignment as a Naval Academy midshipman, she chose aviation. After completing flight school, she was designated a naval aviator in 1996. She then learned to fly helicopters and also became a flight instructor.

Bauernschmidt later earned an M.A. degree in national security and strategic studies from the Naval War College.

== Career ==
Trained as a helicopter pilot, Bauernschmidt served with the "Wolfpack" of HSL-45 on the destroyer USS John Young and the "Warlords" of HSL-51 on the aircraft carrier USS Kitty Hawk. She later served as executive officer and then commanding officer of the "Spartans" of HSM-70 on the aircraft carrier USS George H.W. Bush. In September 2016, after completing nuclear power school, Bauernschmidt became the executive officer of USS Abraham Lincoln. On 5 August 2019, she assumed command of the amphibious transport dock USS San Diego. On 19 August 2021, Bauernschmidt became the commanding officer of USS Abraham Lincoln. After she received her master's degree in strategic studies, she also served at the U.S. Secretary of State's Office of Global Women's Issues.

On January 3, 2022, USS Abraham Lincoln deployed from Naval Air Station North Island under the command of Bauernschmidt.

In February 2023, Bauernschmidt was nominated for promotion to rear admiral (lower half). In December that year, she was assigned as Deputy Commander of the United States Seventh Fleet in Japan. In April 2025, she assumed command of Carrier Strike Group 1. Under her command, the strike group targeted Houthi positions in Yemen during Operation Rough Rider. She relinquished command in October 2025 and reported to the Pacific Fleet in November 2025.

In July 2026, the New York Times reported that Bauernschmidt was one of seven senior Navy officers whose promotions had been blocked by Secretary of Defense Pete Hegseth - five of whom are women or people of color. She had previously been chosen for a promotion to rear admiral by a Navy promotion board composed of senior flag officers. A four-star admiral unsuccessfully interceded, vouching for Bauernschmidt's "competence and character" in hopes of saving her nomination.
