= USS San Diego (LPD-22) =

US Navy amphibious transport ship

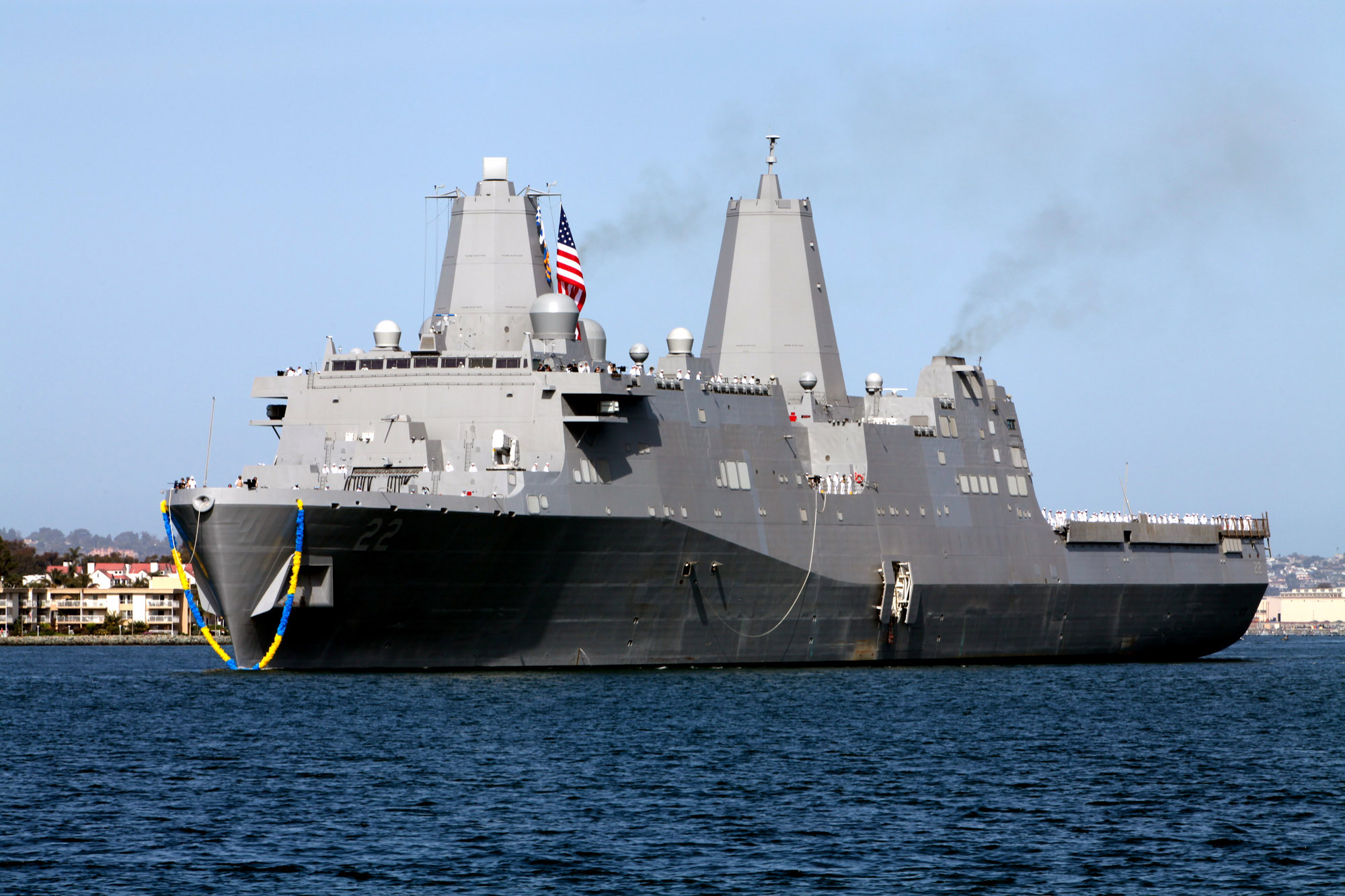
- USS San Diego on 6 April 2012

History

United States
- Name: San Diego
- Namesake: San Diego
- Awarded: 1 June 2006
- Builder: NGSS Ingalls
- Laid down: 23 May 2007
- Launched: 7 May 2010
- Christened: 12 June 2010
- Commissioned: 19 May 2012
- Home port: Sasebo
- Identification: MMSI number: 369970638; Callsign: NSDG; Pennant number: LPD-22
- Motto: Semper Vigilans; (Always vigilant)
- Status: in active service
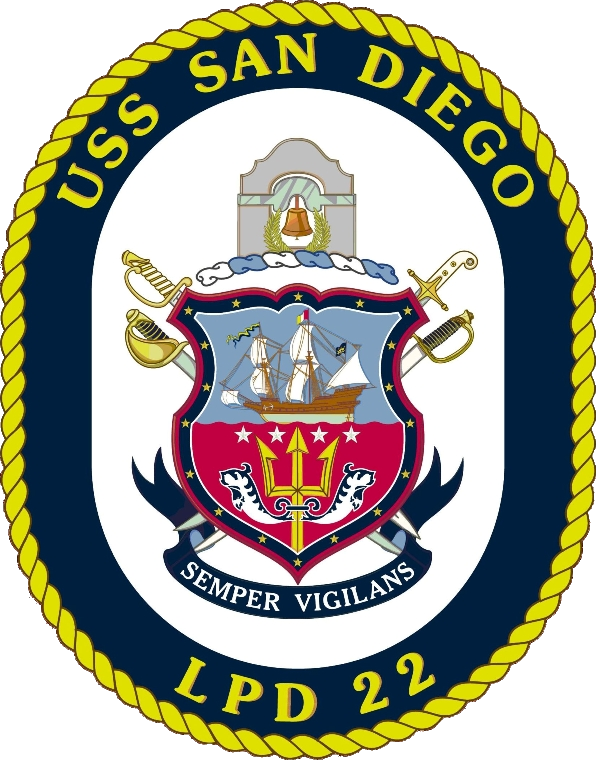
- Badge

General characteristics
- Class & type: San Antonio-class amphibious transport dock
- Displacement: 25,000 tons full
- Length: 208.5 m (684 ft) overall, 201.4 m (661 ft) waterline
- Beam: 31.9 m (105 ft) extreme, 29.5 m (97 ft) waterline
- Draft: 7 m (23 ft)
- Propulsion: Four Colt-Pielstick diesel engines, two shafts, 40,000 hp (30 MW)
- Speed: 22 knots (41 km/h)
- Boats & landing craft carried: Two LCACs (air cushion); or one LCU (conventional)
- Capacity: 699 (66 officers, 633 enlisted); surge to 800 total.
- Complement: 28 officers, 333 enlisted
- Armament: Two 30 mm Bushmaster II cannons, for surface threat defense; two Rolling Airframe Missile launchers for air defense
- Aircraft carried: Four CH-46 Sea Knight helicopters or two MV-22 tilt rotor aircraft may be launched or recovered simultaneously.

USS San Diego (LPD-22), a San Antonio-class amphibious transport dock, is the fourth ship of the United States Navy to be named for San Diego, California.

== Construction ==
=== Ship's name ===
Secretary of the Navy Gordon R. England named the San Diego on 30 April 2004:

San Diego is home to a large number of the Pacific Fleet's ships. For decades our nation's sailors and Marines have begun their service to America at boot camps in San Diego. Thousands of military families and veterans have fallen in love with the area, and are fortunate enough to live and work in San Diego. USS San Diego will project American power to the far corners of the earth and support the cause of freedom well into the 21st century.

The city is the home of Naval Base San Diego, the Navy's largest base in the Pacific, and Marine Corps Recruit Depot San Diego, the United States Marine Corps' west coast recruit training center.

San Diego's keel was laid down on 23 May 2007, at Northrop Grumman's Ingalls shipyard in Pascagoula, Mississippi. She was launched on 7 May 2010, and christened on 12 June, sponsored by Linda Winter, wife of former Navy secretary Donald C. Winter.

On 1 October 2011, it was announced that San Diego had completed her builders trials, including tests of her defensive, communications, propulsion, and other auxiliary systems, leaving only the repair of issues that arose in the builders trials and thereafter Navy Acceptance Trials before delivery. Her acceptance trials were completed on 17 November, ahead of her delivery to the Navy on 19 December.

=== Commissioning ===
San Diego departed Pascagoula on 15 March 2012 and arrived at Naval Station Guantanamo Bay, Cuba, on 19 March for a three-day layover on her way to San Diego. San Diego passed through the Panama Canal on 25 March. She arrived in San Diego on 6 April. San Diego was commissioned on 19 May 2012, in a ceremony at the Navy Pier (next to the USS Midway Museum) in San Diego.

== Operational history ==
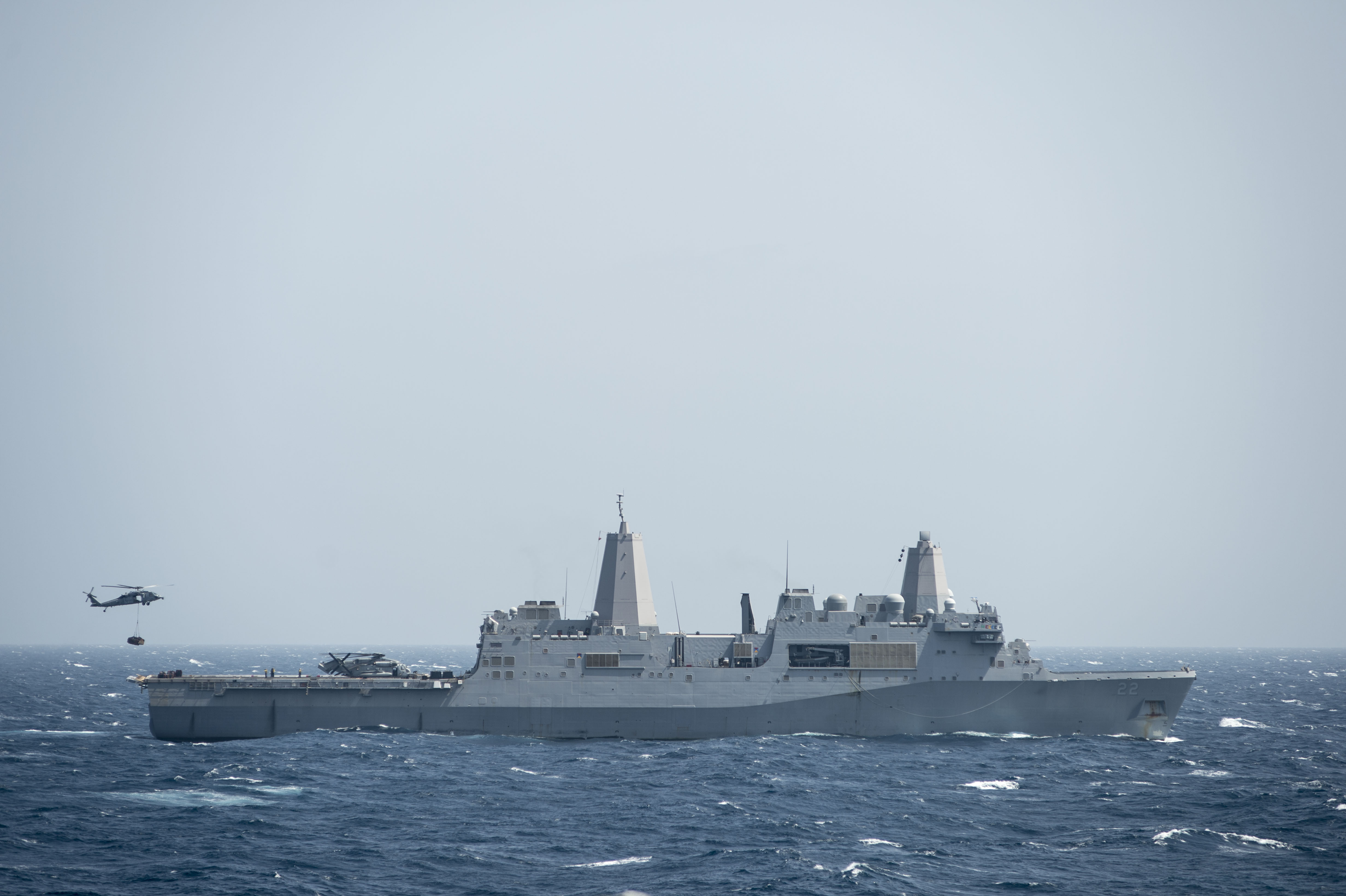
USS San Diego (LPD-22) in the Red Sea in October 2014.

In late 2014, San Diego operated with the Makin Island Amphibious ready group in the United States Fifth Fleet area.

In March 2026, The Wall Street Journal reported that USS Tripoli had been deployed, and was en route, to the Middle East to provide support for Operation Epic Fury. Tripoli is part of an amphibious ready group (ARG), and is being accompanied by San Diego and USS New Orleans. The ARG is reportedly transporting around 2,200 Marine Corps personnel from the Okinawa-based 31st Marine Expeditionary Unit (MEU) and will join the USS Abraham Lincoln-led Carrier Strike Group 3 which is already deployed in the region.

San Diego and New Orleans crossed the strait one day prior to Tripoli which was approaching the northern exit of the Strait of Malacca on 17 March 2026 as per the AIS tracking data accessed by the CNN. As of 20 March, the ships are located to the south of Sri Lanka and is expected to enter the Arabian Sea the following week and will reach the war theatre around 22–23 March.

Meanwhile, the president of the United States has explained in a press conference that he is not "putting troops anywhere" though he would not tell the journalists even if he had taken such decision. However, Reuters cited multiple US security officials saying that the Trump administration is still "considering deploying thousands of U.S. troops to reinforce its operation in the Middle East". The ARG deployment might also be used to free or open the Strait of Hormuz or assaulting the Kharg Island. There has been no firm decision.

On 19 March 2026, Newsmax reported that USS Rushmore might join the Tripoli Amphibious Ready Group since San Diego, which initially sailed with Tripoli and New Orleans, is expected to "hang back" to the Pacific for maintenance which was in the Philippine Sea. On the other hand, the US military also accelerated the deployment of the Boxer Amphibious Ready Group from San Diego.

== Incidents ==
=== Coronavirus pandemic ===
On 17 July 2020, The San Diego Union-Tribune reported that sailors of San Diego had stated, on condition of anonymity, that at least five sailors from their ship had tested positive for COVID-19 during the preceding few days. The sailors had been interviewed by the Union-Tribune presumably regarding a fire aboard nearby amphibious assault ship USS Bonhomme Richard. In response, a Navy spokesperson confirmed that two sailors who were part of the firefighting effort had tested positive for the virus. (Note: The San Diego Union-Tribune reported that the two sailors were from San Diego, while Navy Times reported that the spokesperson "declined to identify the local commands of the afflicted sailors, citing Defense Department policy for not naming units that suffer COVID-19 outbreaks".)

The two sailors had shown symptoms of the disease. One was part of a crew fighting the fire, and the other had been acting as support. One sailor who fought in the fire stated that the fire had destroyed much of Bonhomme Richard's firefighting gear, so the gear of nearby ships, including that of San Diego, was being used, and sailors fighting the fire often swapped gear with each other. In addition, 27 close contacts had been identified and placed in quarantine.
