= Frank E. Petersen =

United States Marine Corps general (1932–2015)

Frank E. Petersen Jr.
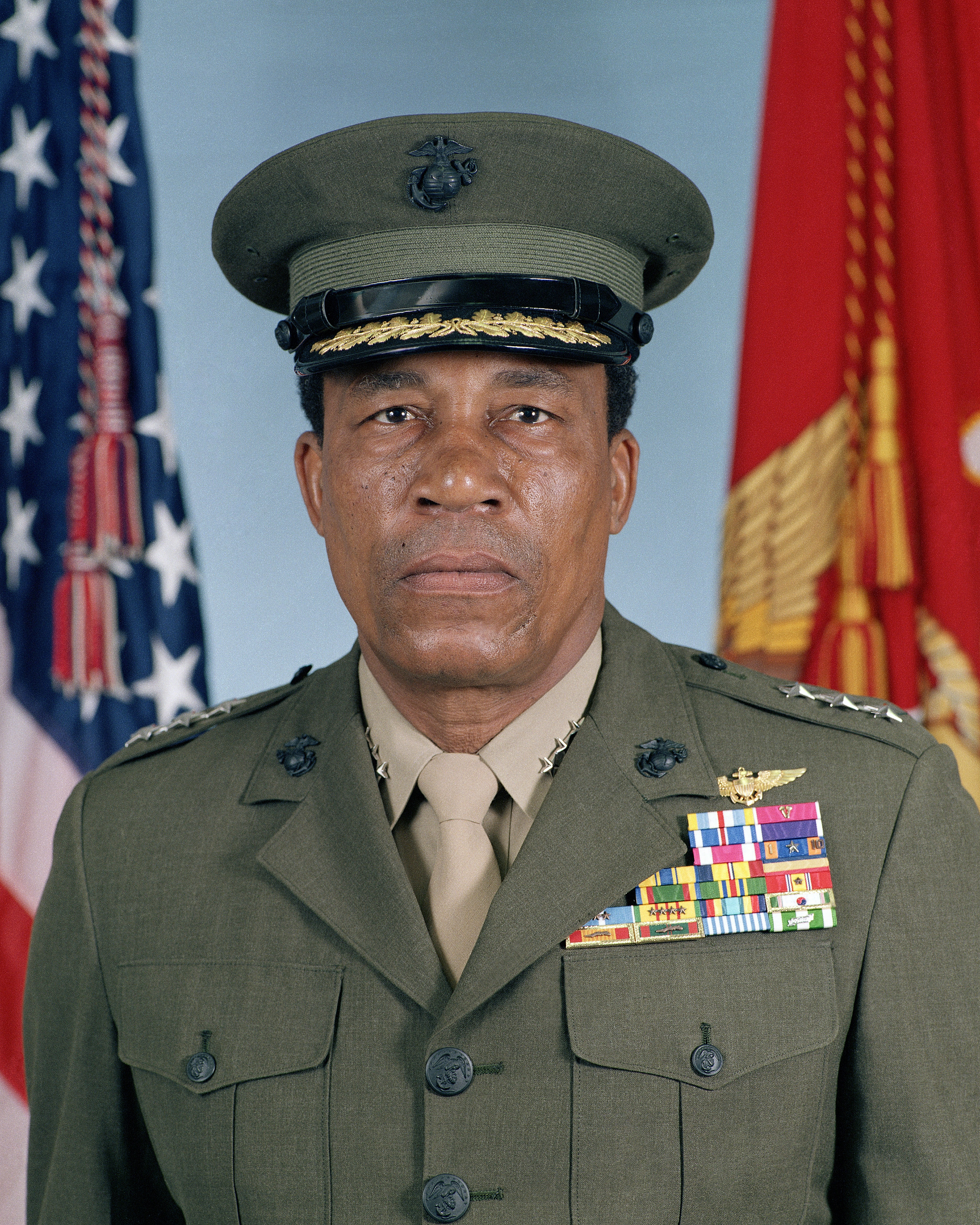
- Born: March 2, 1932; Topeka, Kansas, U.S.
- Died: August 25, 2015 (aged 83); Stevensville, Maryland, U.S.
- Burial place: Arlington National Cemetery
- Military career
- Allegiance: United States of America
- Branch: United States Navy; United States Marine Corps
- Service years: 1950–1952 (USN), 1952–1988 (USMC)
- Rank: Lieutenant general
- Commands: 1st Marine Aircraft Wing; VMFA-212; VMFA-314
- Conflicts: Korean War; Vietnam War
- Awards: Distinguished Service Medal; Defense Superior Service Medal; Legion of Merit with Combat "V"; Distinguished Flying Cross; Purple Heart Medal
- Other work: DuPont DeNemours Inc., VP of Corporate Aviation; National Marrow Donor Program, Chairman

Frank Emmanuel Petersen Jr. (March 2, 1932 – August 25, 2015) was a United States Marine Corps lieutenant general. He was the first African-American Marine Corps aviator and the first African-American Marine Corps general.

Petersen retired from the Marine Corps in 1988 after 38 years of service. "At the time of his retirement he was by date of aviator designation the senior ranking aviator in the U.S. Marine Corps and the United States Navy with respective titles of 'Silver Hawk' and 'Gray Eagle'. His date of designation as an aviator also precedes all other aviators in the U.S. Air Force and Army."

In 2010, President Obama appointed Petersen to the Board of Visitors to the United States Naval Academy.

== U.S. military career ==
Petersen enlisted in the U.S. Navy in June 1950 as a seaman apprentice and served as an electronics technician. When Petersen aced the Navy's entrance exam, the recruiter told him he would make a "great steward." However, being motivated by the recent Korean War combat death of the Navy's first black aviator Jesse L. Brown in December, Petersen vowed to be a combat pilot.

In 1951, he entered the Naval Aviation Cadet Program. In October 1952, he completed flight training and accepted a commission as a second lieutenant in the Marine Corps. Petersen served a combat tour in the Korean War (1953) and in the Vietnam War (1968). His first tactical assignment was with VMFA-212 during the Korean War. He would fly over 350 combat missions, and had over 4,000 hours in various fighter/attack aircraft. He held command positions at all levels of Marine Corps aviation, commanding a Marine Fighter Squadron, a Marine Aircraft Group and a Marine Aircraft Wing. He was also the first African-American to command a fighter squadron (VMFA-314), a fighter air group, an air wing and a major base. Petersen attended George Washington University, from which he received his Bachelor of Arts degree in social science in 1967 and a Master of Arts degree in international relations in 1973. In 1973, he also graduated from the National War College.

On February 23, 1979, he was promoted to brigadier general, becoming the first African-American general in the Marine Corps. In May 1983, he advanced to the rank of major general and on 12 June 1986, he was promoted to lieutenant general. Petersen relinquished duties as the Commanding General, Marine Corps Combat Development Command, Quantico, Virginia on July 8, 1988. He served as the Special Assistant to the Chief of Staff from July 8–31 and retired from the Marine Corps on August 1, 1988. Upon his retirement, he was presented the Distinguished Service Medal for exceptionally meritorious service as the Commanding General, Marine Corps Combat Development Command, Quantico, Virginia, from June 1986 to July 1988.

== Later life ==
In 1998, Petersen wrote an autobiography with J Alfred Phelps, Into the Tigers Jaw. Frank Petersen died at his home in Stevensville, Maryland, on August 25, 2015, from lung cancer. Petersen left behind his wife Alicia Petersen and children Gayle, Frank, Dana Moore, Lyndsay Pulliam and Monique.

== Legacy ==
On November 9, 2016, Secretary of the Navy Ray Mabus officially announced that an Arleigh Burke-class destroyer would be named in honor of Petersen. On February 21, 2017, the keel was laid for the guided-missile destroyer USS Frank E. Petersen Jr. at Huntington Ingalls Industries shipyard, Pascagoula, Mississippi.

The Navy said that the ship "will be built in the Flight IIA configuration with the Aegis Baseline 9 Combat System which includes integrated air and missile defense capability. This system delivers quick reaction time, high firepower, and increased electronic countermeasures capability for anti-air warfare". The ship was commissioned on 14 May 2022 at Charleston, South Carolina.

== Military awards ==
Petersen's military decorations and awards include:

Badge	Naval Aviator Badge			
1st Row	Navy Distinguished Service Medal			
2nd Row	Defense Superior Service Medal	Legion of Merit w/ Combat "V"	Distinguished Flying Cross	Purple Heart Medal
3rd Row	Meritorious Service Medal	Air Medal w/ one golden award numeral 1, 5/16" Silver Star and Strike/Flight numeral 10	Air Force Commendation Medal	Combat Action Ribbon
4th Row	Navy Presidential Unit Citation	Navy Unit Commendation	Navy Meritorious Unit Commendation	National Defense Service Medal w/ one 3/16" bronze star
5th Row	Korean Service Medal w/ two 3/16" bronze stars	Vietnam Service Medal w/ four 3/16" bronze stars	Navy Sea Service Deployment Ribbon	Republic of Korea Presidential Unit Citation
6th Row	Republic of Vietnam Gallantry Cross Unit Citation w/ palm and frame	Republic of Vietnam Civil Actions Unit Citation w/ palm and frame	United Nations Korea Medal	Republic of Vietnam Campaign Medal w/ 1960- device

== See also ==
- List of African-American firsts
- Jesse L. Brown, first African-American U.S. Navy aviator

== Publications ==
- Petersen, Frank E. (1998). Into the Tiger's Jaw : America's First Black Marine Aviator — The Autobiography of Lt. Gen. Frank E. Petersen. Presidio Press. ISBN 0-89141-675-7.
