= VMFA-314 =

Marine Fighter Attack Squadron 314
- VMFA-314 Insignia
- Active: 1 October 1943 – 30 April 1947; 1 February 1952 – present
- Country: United States
- Branch: United States Marine Corps
- Type: Fighter/Attack squadron
- Role: SEAD; Air Superiority; Aerial Reconnaissance; Close air support Land/Maritime Strike
- Part of: Marine Aircraft Group 11; 3rd Marine Aircraft Wing; Carrier Air Wing Nine
- Garrison/HQ: Marine Corps Air Station Miramar
- Nicknames: Black Knights; Bob's Cats (World War II)
- Motto: ONCE A KNIGHT IS NEVER ENOUGH
- Tail Code: VW / NG
- Engagements: World War II; Battle of Okinawa; Vietnam War; Operation El Dorado Canyon; Persian Gulf War; Operation Restore Hope; Operation Southern Watch; Global War on Terrorism; Operation Noble Eagle; Operation Enduring Freedom; Operation Inherent Resolve; Iraq War Operation Prosperity Guardian Operation Poseidon Archer Operation Epic Fury

Commanders
- Current commander: LtCol Lanier A. Bishop III
- Notable commanders: Homer S. Hill, Frank E. Petersen

Aircraft flown
- Fighter: F4U Corsair; F9F Panther; F4D Skyray; F-4 Phantom II; F/A-18 Hornet; F-35C Lightning II

Marine Fighter Attack Squadron 314 (VMFA-314) is a United States Marine Corps F-35C Lightning II squadron. The squadron, known as the "Black Knights", is based at Marine Corps Air Station Miramar, California and falls under the command of Marine Aircraft Group 11 (MAG-11) and the 3rd Marine Aircraft Wing (3d MAW), but deploys with the US Navy's Carrier Air Wing Nine (NG).

== History ==
=== World War II ===
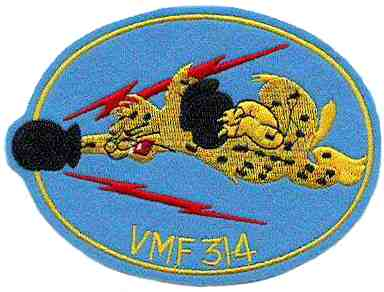
The squadron's World War II logo.

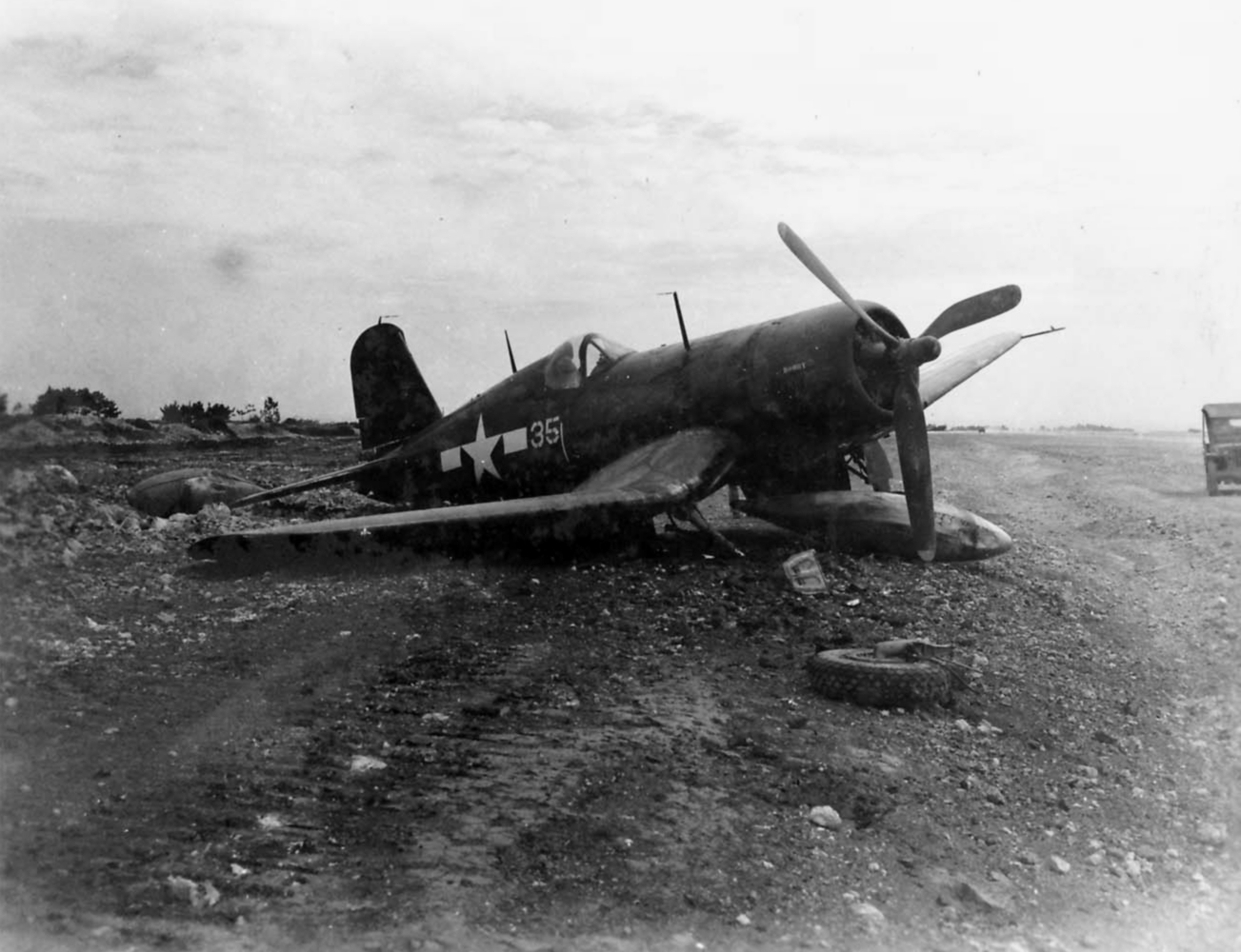
A battle-damaged VMF-314 F4U Corsair on Ie Shima in 1945.

Marine Fighting Squadron 314 (VMF-314) was commissioned on October 1, 1943, at Marine Corps Air Station Cherry Point, North Carolina. The squadron was originally given the nickname of, "Bob's Cats". The squadron was assigned to Marine Aircraft Group 32 (MAG 32) flying the F4U Corsair and began training immediately for combat in the South Pacific. In February 1944, the squadron, along with VMF-324, was among the first units aboard Marine Corps Auxiliary Air Field Kinston. The squadron departed MCAAF Kinston for the Pacific theater and arrived at Marine Corps Air Station Ewa on June 18, 1944, and was reassigned to Marine Aircraft Group 23, 3rd MAW. From there it deployed to Midway Atoll. VMF-314 returned to MCAS Ewa in December 1944 and remained there until April 1945. In May 1945 the squadron moved to Ie Shima to take part in the Battle of Okinawa as part of Marine Aircraft Group 22 (MAG-22). During the campaign, VMF-314 pilots were credited with 11 kills and the squadron was awarded the Presidential Unit Citation. After the surrender of Japan, VMF-314 moved to Kyūshū, Japan as part of the occupation force. VMF-314 returned to Marine Corps Air Station El Toro in November 1945 and in March 1946 they arrived back at MCAS Cherry Point. For a short time, the squadron was reassigned to Marine Aircraft Group 22 (MAG-22), 9th Marine Aircraft Wing but was later decommissioned on April 30, 1947.

=== Postwar years ===
VMF-314 was recommissioned in 1952 at MCAS Miami, Florida and was assigned to Marine Aircraft Group 31 (MAG-31), 3rd Marine Aircraft Wing flying the latest version of the Corsair. That same year, the squadron transitioned to the new F9F Panther. The next three years saw VMF-314 deployed twice, first to Roosevelt Roads, Puerto Rico, and then to Naval Air Facility Atsugi, Japan for an 18-month tour. VMF-314 earned the Korean Service Medal for operations conducted between 11 September 1953 and 27 July 1954. In 1955, VMF-314 returned from Japan and was assigned to Marine Aircraft Group 15, 3rd MAW, now stationed at Marine Corps Air Station El Toro, California.

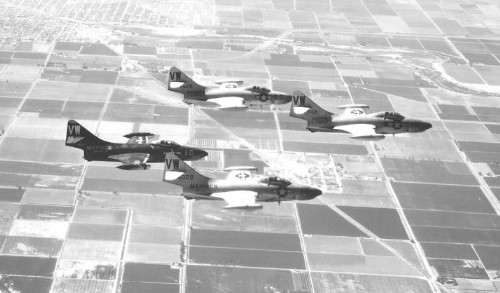
Four F9Fs from VMF(AW)-314 in formation.

In 1957, the squadron received the new F4D Skyray and was designated VMF(AW)-314. During that same year, the squadron officially became the "Black Knights", was awarded the Commandant’s Aviation Efficiency Trophy. They were briefly deployed to NAF Atsugi, Japan and then throughout the Far East both on land, including Ping-tung, Taiwan in support of the Republic of China against the communist China, as well as on board the fast attack carriers USS Hancock and USS Ticonderoga.

In 1961, the squadron became the first Marine squadron to transition to the new F-4B Phantom II and was designated VMFA-314. Between 1961 and 1964, the squadron deployed eight times. These included three separate carrier deployments and a single-flight aerial refueling mission spanning the Pacific Ocean from MCAS El Toro to Naval Air Station Atsugi, Japan.

=== Vietnam War ===
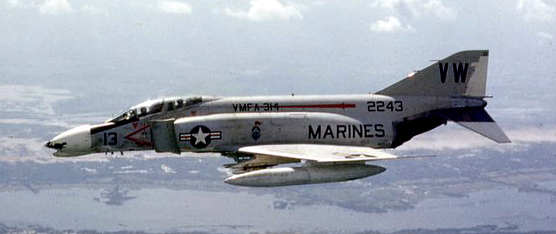
A F-4B Phantom from VMFA-314 returns to Chu Lai in September 1968.

In 1965, VMFA-314 headed off on board USS Valley Forge for combat operations in South Vietnam. From 1965 to 1970, the squadron flew more than 25,000 combat hours out of Chu Lai Air Base and Da Nang Air Base, and employed more than 100 million pounds of ordnance in support of the Marine rifleman and other allied ground units. In 1968, they received the Chief of Naval Operations Aviation Safety Award. In 1969, VMFA–314 was awarded the Hanson Trophy as the best Fighter Attack Squadron in the Marine Corps while under the command of Frank E. Petersen. The Commandant's Efficiency Trophy was awarded to the squadron in 1969 and again in 1970. In September 1970, VMFA-314 ended forty-nine months of deployed combat operations and received the Meritorious Unit Commendation for its outstanding performance.

=== Post-Vietnam War years ===
In May 1982, the squadron’s last F-4 was transferred in preparation for transition to the new F/A-18A Hornet. Later that year, VMFA-314 received the first of its F/A-18s under the command of Lt Col P. B. Field, becoming the first tactical squadron in the Marine Corps and Navy to employ the Hornet.

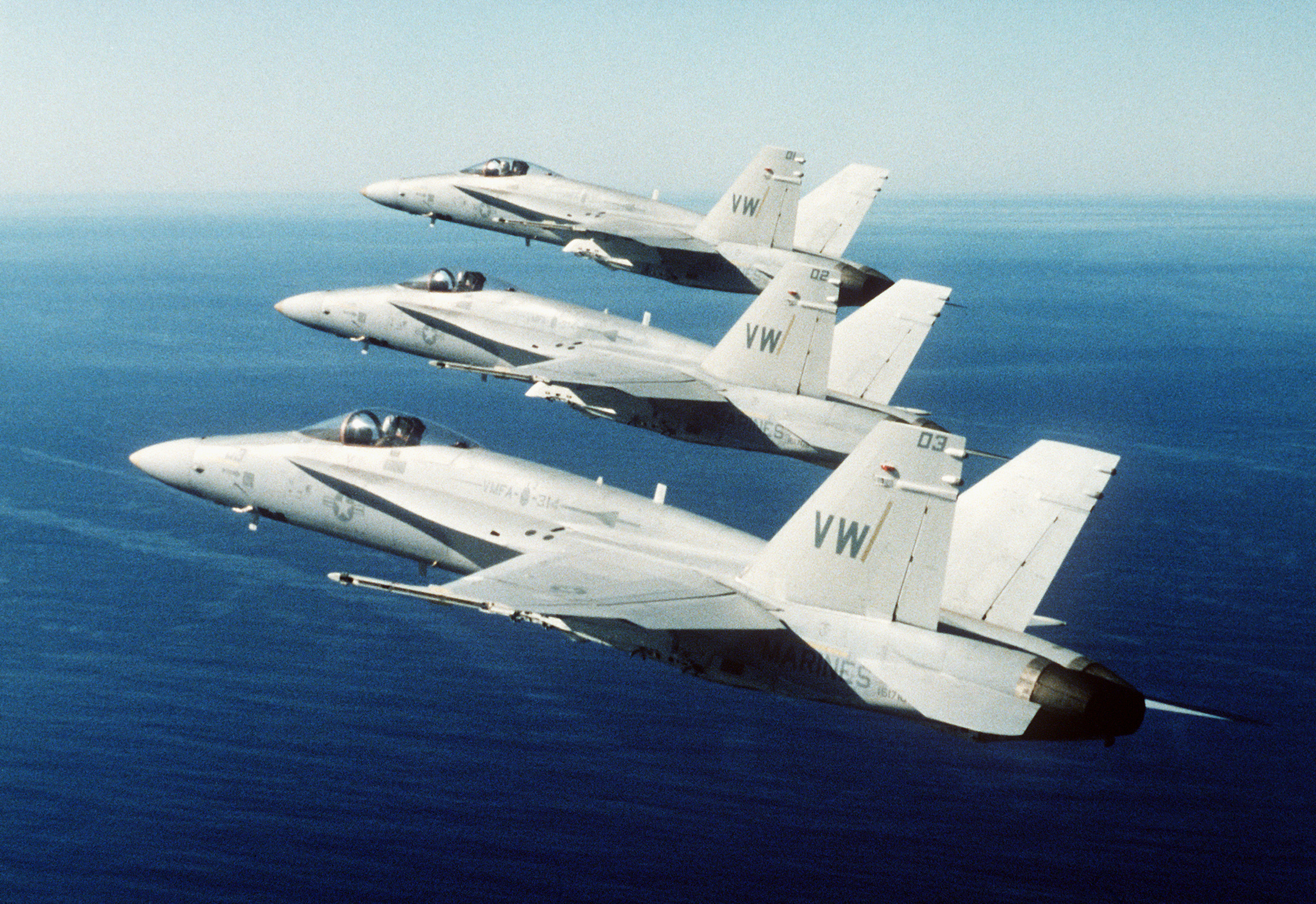
F/A-18A Hornets from VMFA-314 conducting formation flying in 1984.

In 1985, VMFA-314 transferred to Carrier Air Wing 13 (CVW-13), and embarked on board USS Coral Sea for duty with the U.S. Sixth Fleet in the Mediterranean Sea. They participated in Freedom of Navigation operations in the vicinity of Libya and took part in combat operations in support of Operation El Dorado Canyon in the Gulf of Sidra and in Libya.

=== Persian Gulf War and the 1990s ===
In the summer of 1990, while preparing to return to the Western Pacific, the squadron were rapidly deployed to the Persian Gulf and were the first Marine F/A-18 squadron to arrive in Bahrain for Operation Desert Shield as part of Marine Air Group 70. For nearly six months the "Black Knights" maintained 24-hour-a-day Combat Air Patrols over the Persian Gulf.

On 16 January 1991, Operation Desert Shield shifted to Operation Desert Storm. The squadron flew over 1,500 hours and 814 combat sorties, more sorties than any other Navy or Marine Corps squadron. Missions flown during the war included Escort, SEAD, Mig Sweep, and Strike. They returned from the Middle East in March 1991 without the loss of a single squadron member or aircraft.

In August 1992, VMFA-314 transferred to Carrier Air Wing 11 and in 1993 deployed to the Indian Ocean and Persian Gulf on board USS Abraham Lincoln. During the deployment the squadron participated in Operation Southern Watch, enforcing the U.N. "no-fly-zone" in southern Iraq, and in Operation Continue Hope, providing close air support to the 13th Marine Expeditionary Unit (13th MEU) and 22nd Marine Expeditionary Unit (22nd MEU) off the coast of Somalia. The squadron returned from cruise in December 1993 and was reassigned to Marine Aircraft Group 11 (MAG-11).

In June 1994, VMFA-314 was one of the first MAG-11 squadrons to move from MCAS El Toro to MCAS Miramar. In February 1996, the squadron received new lot 18 F/A-18C aircraft. In 1997, VMFA-314 transferred to Carrier Air Wing 9 and deployed on an "Around the World" cruise on board USS Nimitz. During the deployment, the squadron again participated in Operation Southern Watch.

In January 2000, the squadron deployed aboard USS John C. Stennis, with Carrier Air Wing Nine, for a six-month deployment to the Western Pacific and Persian Gulf in support of Operation Southern Watch. While in the Gulf, the "Black Knights" flew contingency operations under combat conditions in support of U.N. Resolutions, delivering accurate air-to-ground ordnance under hostile fire.

=== Global war on terrorism ===
VMFA-314 was called upon to deploy U.S. Marines and aircraft on board USS John C. Stennis in support of Operation Noble Eagle. The September 11 attacks of 2001 caused the planned deployment on board John C. Stennis to be accelerated by two months. Following a shortened at-sea period for FleetEx, VMFA-314 deployed on 12 November 2001 in support of Operation Enduring Freedom. The squadron began flying combat sorties on 18 December 2001 and delivered over 69,000 pounds of ordnance in support of U.S. forces on the ground in Afghanistan. Midway into a six-month deployment, VMFA-314 was extended in theater an extra five weeks resulting in a monumental 265 deployed days over a year’s period including a 98-day straight at-sea period.

The squadron deployed to the Iraq War in support of Operation Iraqi Freedom in March 2009. They were based at Al Asad Airbase and returned in September 2009.

The Black Knights were the first U.S. Marine Squadron to conduct offensive operations against ISIS in support of Operation Inherent Resolve 2014.

=== F-35C Transition ===
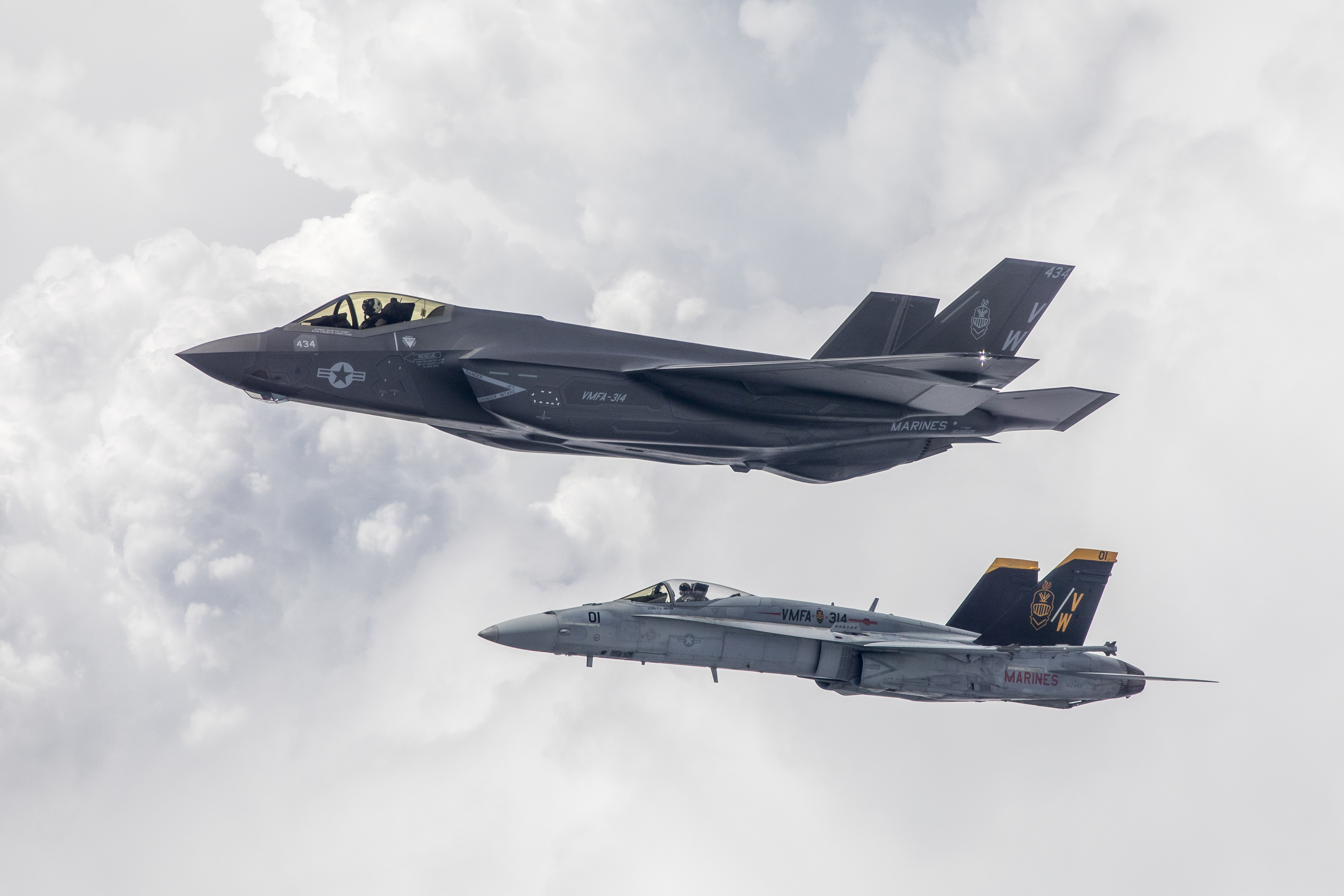
A F-35C and a F/A-18A of VMFA-314 in flight, in June 2019.

On 21 June 2019, the squadron retired the F/A-18A++ and began training on the F-35C. VMFA-314 was the first Marine Corps squadron to transition to the F-35C receiving its first aircraft on 21 January 2020.

On 3 January 2022, VMFA-314 departed Naval Base San Diego onboard the USS Abraham Lincoln (CVN-72) as part of Carrier Air Wing Nine. VMFA-314 was the first Marine Corps F-35C squadron to deploy on an aircraft carrier.

During their 2024 deployment as part of Carrier Air Wing 9 (CVW-9) aboard the USS Abraham Lincoln (CVN-72), VMFA-314 left MCAS Miramar for stationing in the South China Sea as part of their WESTPAC deployment. Shortly after their departure, Carrier Strike Group 3 (CSG-3) was redirected to C5F within Central Command (CENTCOM) by Secretary of Defense Lloyd Austin.

For four continuous months, VMFA-314 participated in numerous missions supporting NAVCENT and CENTCOM operations, ultimately culminating in a series of strikes targeting military facilities deep within Houthi-controlled Yemen. These deep strikes employed more than 72,000 pounds of ordnance and marked the first combat employment of the F-35C Lightning II, known as the ‘Panther’.

On 3 February 2026, an F-35C from VMFA-314 shot down an Iranian Shahed-139 drone in the Arabian Sea.

On 28 Feb 2026, as part of Carrier Air Wing NINE, VMFA-314 launched from the USS Abraham Lincoln to lead the opening wave of Operation Epic Fury (OEF) against the Islamic Republic of Iran. During the first 3 weeks of OEF, F-35Cs from VMFA-314 destroyed over 60 Iranian surface combatants, while sustaining over 112hrs of continuous combat operations.

== Awards ==
- Presidential Unit Citation, with two Bronze Stars
- Navy Unit Commendation, with four Bronze Stars
- Meritorious Unit Citation streamer, with one Bronze Star

2025, 2015, 1968 Robert M. Hanson Marine Fighter Attack Squadron of the Year Award

== In popular culture ==
USMC Major John Trotti, who flew the F-4 Phantom while a pilot for the squadron during the Vietnam war, recounted his experiences in the memoir Phantom Over Vietnam.

The squadron was portrayed flying F/A-18Cs and fighting against an alien invasion in the 1996 film Independence Day. The squadron was depicted as based in MCAS El Toro, although they had relocated to NAS Miramar two years prior.

The F/A-18s shown in the movie The Rock are marked with VMFA-314 livery, despite having "US Air Force" on the fuselage, and despite the USAF not actually operating that type of aircraft. This is because the movie used the same prop as Independence Day.

== See also ==
- United States Marine Corps Aviation
- List of active United States Marine Corps aircraft squadrons
- List of inactive United States Marine Corps aircraft squadrons
- VMM-264, a U.S. Marine Corps Medium helicopter squadron of the same namesake
- VFA-154, a U.S. Navy Fighter attack squadron of the same namesake
- RSAF Black Knights, a Singaporean Air Force precision aerobatic team of the same namesake
