= USS Frank E. Petersen Jr. =

Arleigh Burke-class destroyer

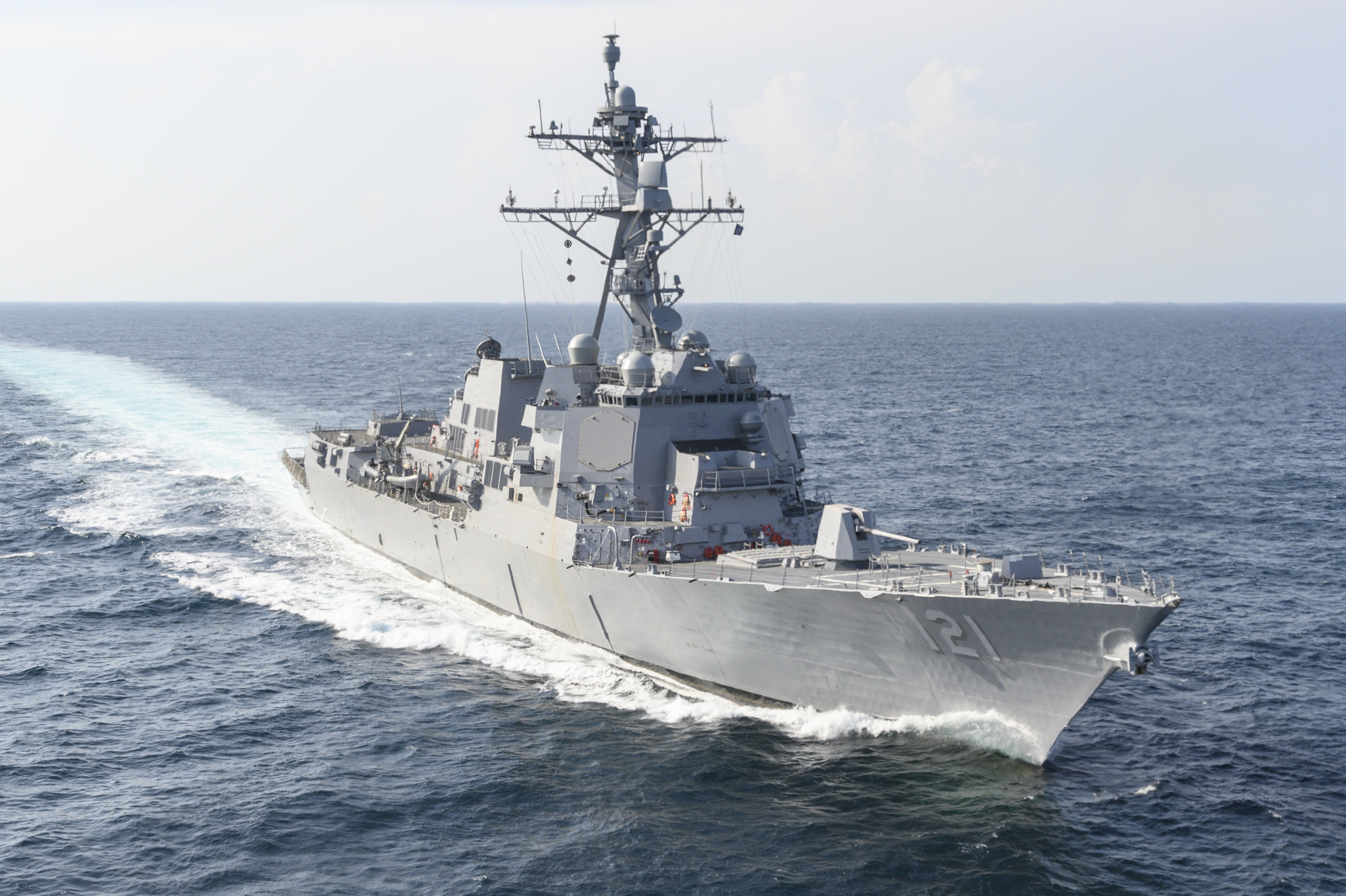
- USS Frank E. Petersen Jr. in August 2021

History

United States
- Name: Frank E. Petersen Jr.
- Namesake: Frank E. Petersen
- Awarded: 3 June 2013
- Builder: Ingalls Shipbuilding
- Laid down: 21 February 2017
- Launched: 13 July 2018
- Sponsored by: Alicia J. Petersen, D’Arcy Neller
- Christened: 6 October 2018
- Acquired: 30 November 2021
- Commissioned: 14 May 2022
- Home port: Pearl Harbor
- Identification: Hull number: DDG-121
- Motto: Into the Tiger's Jaw
- Status: In active service
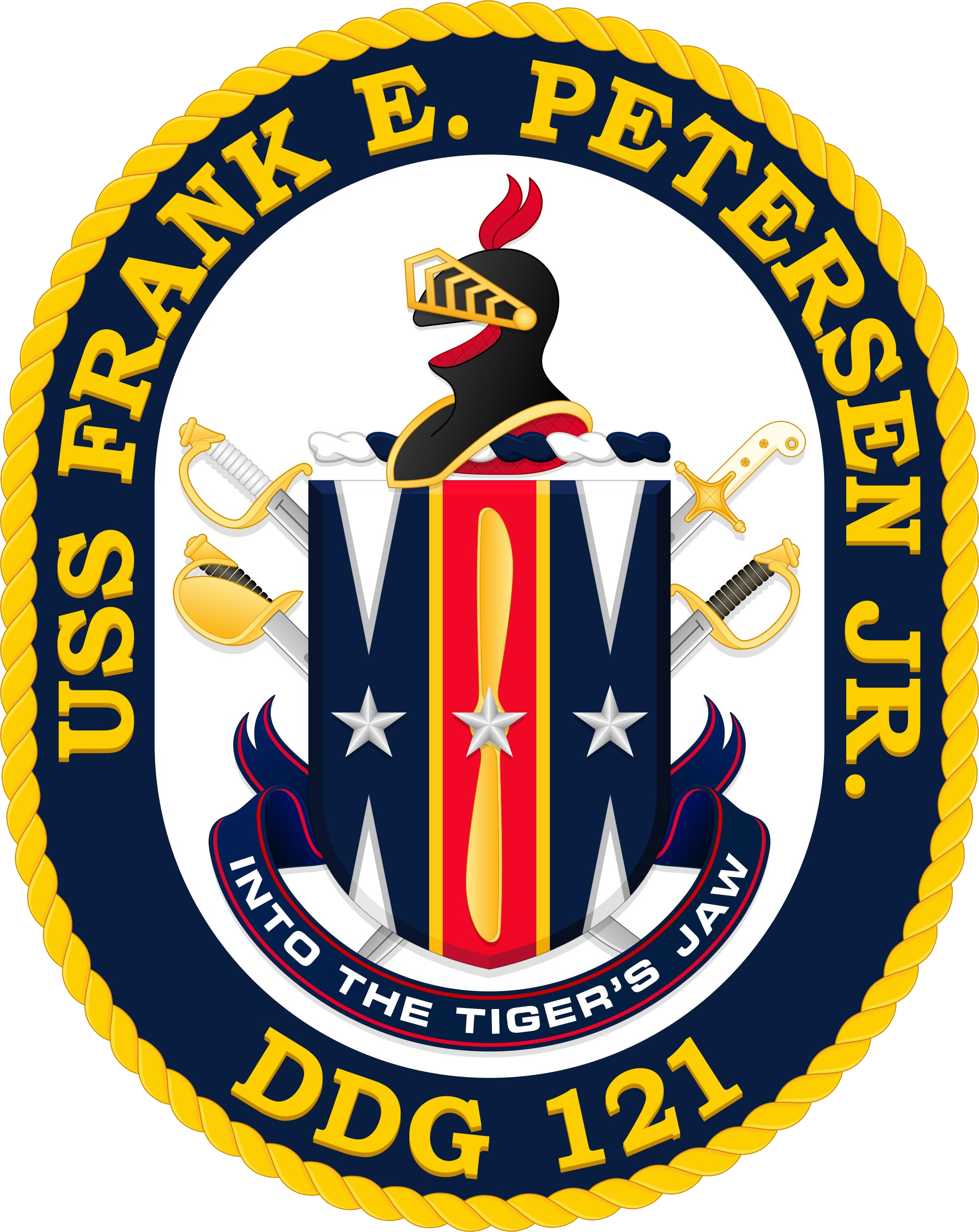
- Badge

General characteristics
- Class & type: Arleigh Burke-class destroyer
- Displacement: 9,217 tons (full load)
- Length: 513 ft (156 m)
- Beam: 66 ft (20 m)
- Propulsion: 4 × General Electric LM2500 gas turbines 100,000 shp (75,000 kW)
- Speed: 31 knots (57 km/h; 36 mph)
- Complement: 380 officers and enlisted
- Armament: Guns: 1 × 5-inch (127 mm)/62 Mk 45 Mod 4 (lightweight gun); 1 × 20 mm (0.8 in) Phalanx CIWS; 2 × 25 mm (0.98 in) Mk 38 machine gun system; 4 × 0.50 in (12.7 mm) caliber guns; Missiles: 1 × 32-cell, 1 × 64-cell (96 total cells) Mk 41 vertical launching system (VLS): RIM-66M surface-to-air missile; RIM-156 surface-to-air missile; RIM-174A Standard ERAM; RIM-161 anti-ballistic missile; RIM-162 ESSM (quad-packed); BGM-109 Tomahawk cruise missile; RUM-139 vertical launch ASROC; Torpedoes: 2 × Mark 32 triple torpedo tubes: Mark 46 lightweight torpedo; Mark 50 lightweight torpedo; Mark 54 lightweight torpedo
- Aircraft carried: 2 × MH-60R Seahawk helicopters
- Aviation facilities: Double hangar and helipad

USS Frank E. Petersen Jr. (DDG-121) is an Arleigh Burke-class (Flight IIA Technology Insertion) Aegis guided missile destroyer in the United States Navy. The ship was named for United States Marine Corps Lieutenant General Frank E. Petersen Jr. the first African-American Marine Corps aviator and the first African-American Marine Corps general. The contract for the ship, along with the name, was first announced in a press release from Huntington Ingalls Industries on 30 March 2016.

== Construction and career ==
The first "cutting of steel" took place in April 2016 and her keel was laid on 21 February 2017. She was launched on 13 July 2018. and christened on 6 October 2018. The ship was commissioned on 14 May 2022 at Charleston, South Carolina by Ms. Gayle Petersen, Lt. Gen. Petersen's daughter.

USS Frank E. Petersen Jr returned to their home port, Joint Base Pearl Harbor-Hickam, 12 December 2024, after a five-month maiden deployment assigned to the USS Abraham Lincoln Carrier Strike Group (ABECSG). Throughout deployment, Frank E. Petersen Jr. completed over 475 hours of flight quarters, 10 hours of small boat operations, conducted 17 replenishments-at-sea, 15 sea and anchor details, qualified 60 sailors in small craft action team (SCAT) and 17 sailors in Security Reaction Force Basic (SRF-B). Frank E. Petersen Jr. also welcomed six new chief petty officers, six new first class petty officers and 18 new second class petty officers.

On 12 April during the 2026 Iran war peace talks she and her sister ship USS Michael Murphy transited through the Strait of Hormuz into the Persian Gulf to "begin setting the conditions" to remove sea mines placed by the Iran Revolutionary Guard Corps.

== Awards ==
- Battle "E" – (2024)
