= USS Abraham Lincoln (CVN-72) =

US Navy Nimitz-class aircraft carrier

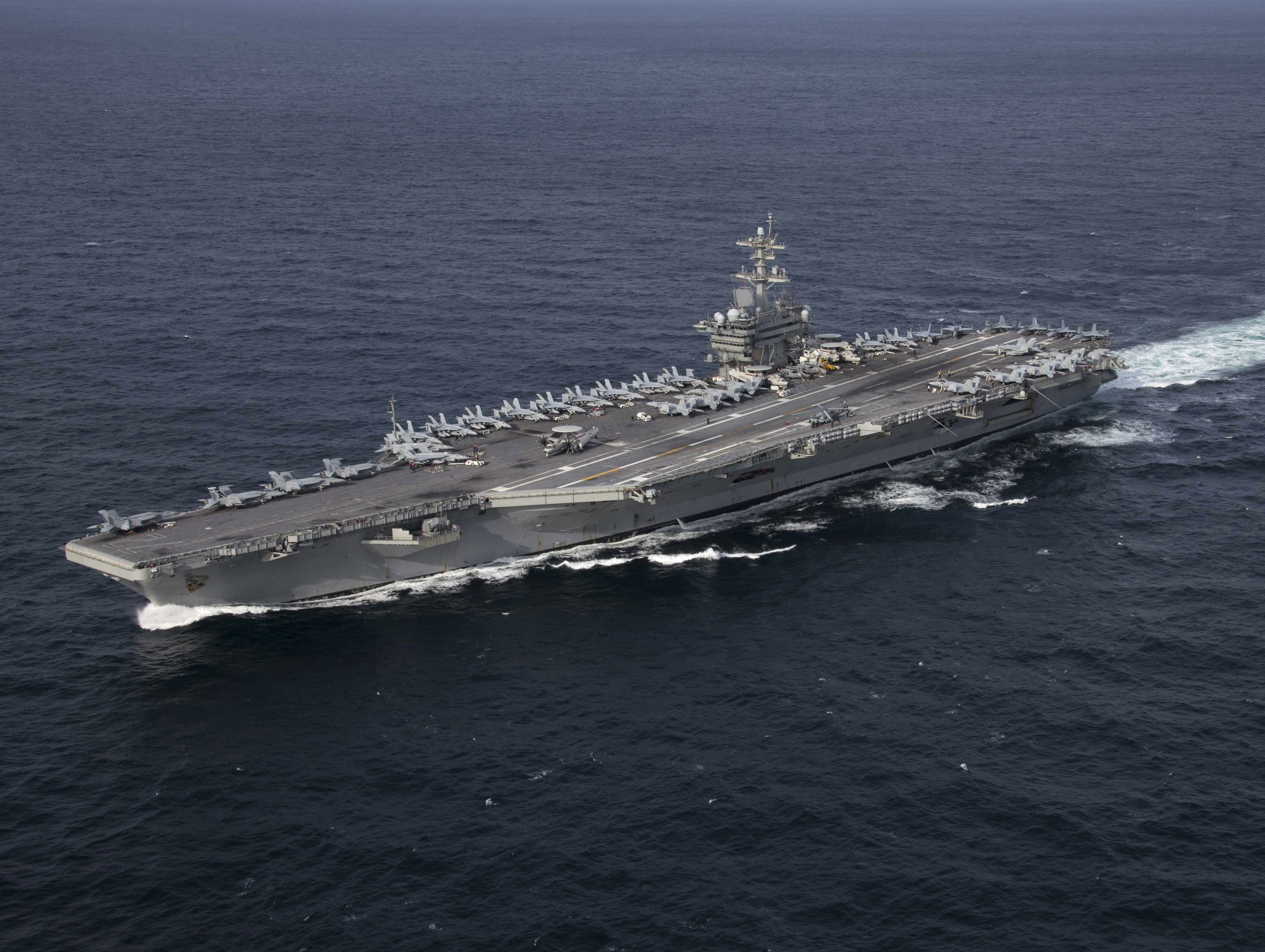
- USS Abraham Lincoln (CVN-72)

History

United States
- Name: Abraham Lincoln
- Namesake: Abraham Lincoln
- Operator: U.S. Navy
- Awarded: 27 December 1982
- Builder: Newport News Shipbuilding
- Cost: $2.24 billion ($6.82 billion in 2024)
- Laid down: 3 November 1984
- Launched: 13 February 1988
- Sponsored by: JoAnn K. Webb
- Christened: 13 February 1988
- Acquired: 30 October 1989
- Commissioned: 11 November 1989
- Home port: Naval Air Station North Island
- Identification: MMSI number: 369970406; Callsign: NABE; Hull number: CVN-72
- Motto: Shall Not Perish
- Nickname(s): Abe
- Status: in active service
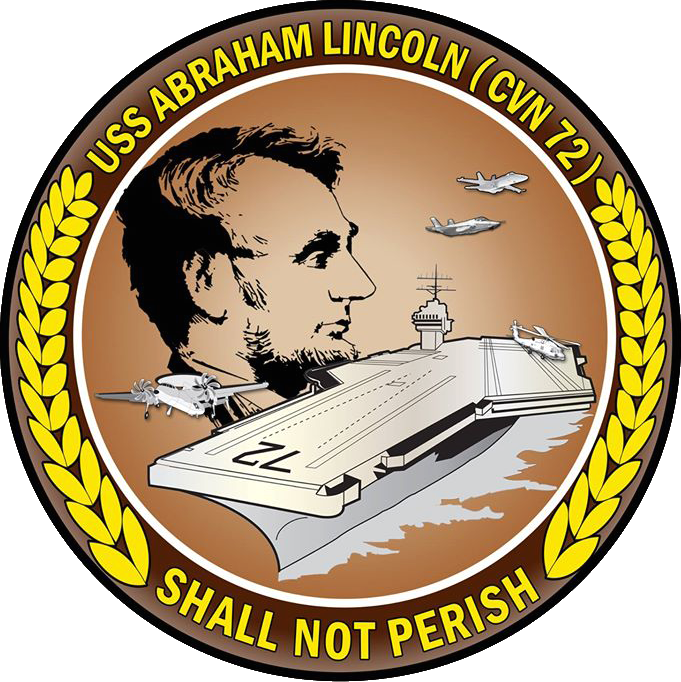
- Badge

General characteristics
- Class & type: Nimitz-class aircraft carrier
- Displacement: 104,300 long tons (116,800 short tons)
- Length: Overall: 1,092 ft (332.8 m); Waterline: 1,040 ft (317.0 m)
- Beam: Overall: 252 ft (76.8 m)
- Draft: Maximum navigational: 37 ft (11.3 m); Limit: 41 ft (12.5 m)
- Installed power: 2 × A4W nuclear reactors; 260,000 shp (190,000 kW)
- Propulsion: 4 × steam turbines; 4 × shafts
- Speed: Over 30 knots (56 km/h; 35 mph)
- Range: Unlimited distance; 20–25 years
- Complement: Ship's company: 3,200; Air wing: 2,480
- Sensors & processing systems: AN/SPS-48E 3D air search radar; AN/SPS-49(V)5 2D air search radar; AN/SPQ-9B target acquisition radar; AN/SPN-46 air traffic control radar; AN/SPN-43C air traffic control radar; AN/SPN-41 landing aid radar; 4 × Mk 91 NSSM guidance systems; 4 × Mk 95 radars
- Electronic warfare & decoys: SLQ-32A(V)4 Countermeasures suite; SLQ-25A Nixie torpedo countermeasures
- Armament: 2 × Mk 57 Mod 3 Sea Sparrow; 2 × RIM-116 Rolling Airframe Missile; 2 × Phalanx CIWS
- Aircraft carried: 90 fixed wing and helicopters

USS Abraham Lincoln (CVN-72) is the fifth Nimitz-class aircraft carrier in the United States Navy. It is the third Navy ship to have been named after the former president Abraham Lincoln. Its home port is NAS North Island, San Diego, California; she is a member of the United States Pacific Fleet. It was administratively responsible to Commander, Naval Air Forces Pacific, and operationally serves as the flagship of Carrier Strike Group 3 and host to Carrier Air Wing Nine.

== Abraham Lincoln Carrier Strike Group ==
Abraham Lincoln is part of Carrier Strike Group Three (CSG-3). Carrier Air Wing Nine (CVW-9) is embarked. Abraham Lincoln is the flagship of the strike group, and the home of the commander of Destroyer Squadron 21.

=== Ships of Destroyer Squadron 21 ===
- USS O'Kane (DDG-77) – Arleigh Burke class destroyer
- USS Spruance (DDG-111) – Arleigh Burke class destroyer
- USS Frank E. Petersen Jr. (DDG-121) – Arleigh Burke class destroyer

=== Squadrons of CVW-9 ===
Code	Insignia	Squadron	Nickname	Assigned Aircraft
VFA-14		Strike Fighter Squadron 14	Tophatters	F/A-18E Super Hornet
VFA-41		Strike Fighter Squadron 41	Black Aces	F/A-18F Super Hornet
VMFA-314		Marine Fighter Attack Squadron 314	Black Knights	F-35C Lightning II
VFA-151		Strike Fighter Squadron 151	Vigilantes	F/A-18E Super Hornet
VAQ-133		Electronic Attack Squadron 133	Wizards	EA-18G Growler
VAW-117		Carrier Airborne Early Warning Squadron 117	Wallbangers	E-2D Hawkeye
HSC-14		Helicopter Sea Combat Squadron 14	Chargers	MH-60S Seahawk
HSM-71		Helicopter Maritime Strike Squadron 71	Raptors	MH-60R Seahawk

== Ship history ==
=== Construction ===
Abraham Lincoln's contract was awarded to Newport News Shipbuilding on 27 December 1982. Her keel was laid 3 November 1984 at Newport News, Virginia. The ship was launched on 13 February 1988 and commissioned on 11 November 1989 which was also Veterans Day. The cost was over US$3 billion dollars and is the fifth Nimitz-class aircraft carrier. The ship underwent a 4 year modernization process where it got a refueling and complex overhaul starting in 2013 before it was completed in 2017.

=== 1990 to 1999 ===
In September 1990, Abraham Lincoln was transferred to the Pacific, performing Gringo—Gaucho with the Argentine Naval Aviation during the transit. From 4 October, Abraham Lincoln formed CTG 24.8 in company with USS Doyle; 6 October transit with USS Pawcatuck and Doyle in company. On 5 November 1990, as Abraham Lincoln was anchored in Valparaíso in Chile, Frente Patriótico Manuel Rodríguez guerrillas detonated a bomb inside the restaurant Max und Moritz, in the seaside resort of Viña del Mar, wounding three of her sailors.

On 28 May 1991, Abraham Lincoln's maiden Western Pacific deployment came unexpectedly, in response to Operation Desert Shield/Desert Storm. The ship had the staffs of Commander, Carrier Group Three, Rear Admiral Timothy W. Wright, and Destroyer Squadron 9 embarked, as well as Carrier Air Wing Eleven. She was accompanied by a seven-ship battle group.

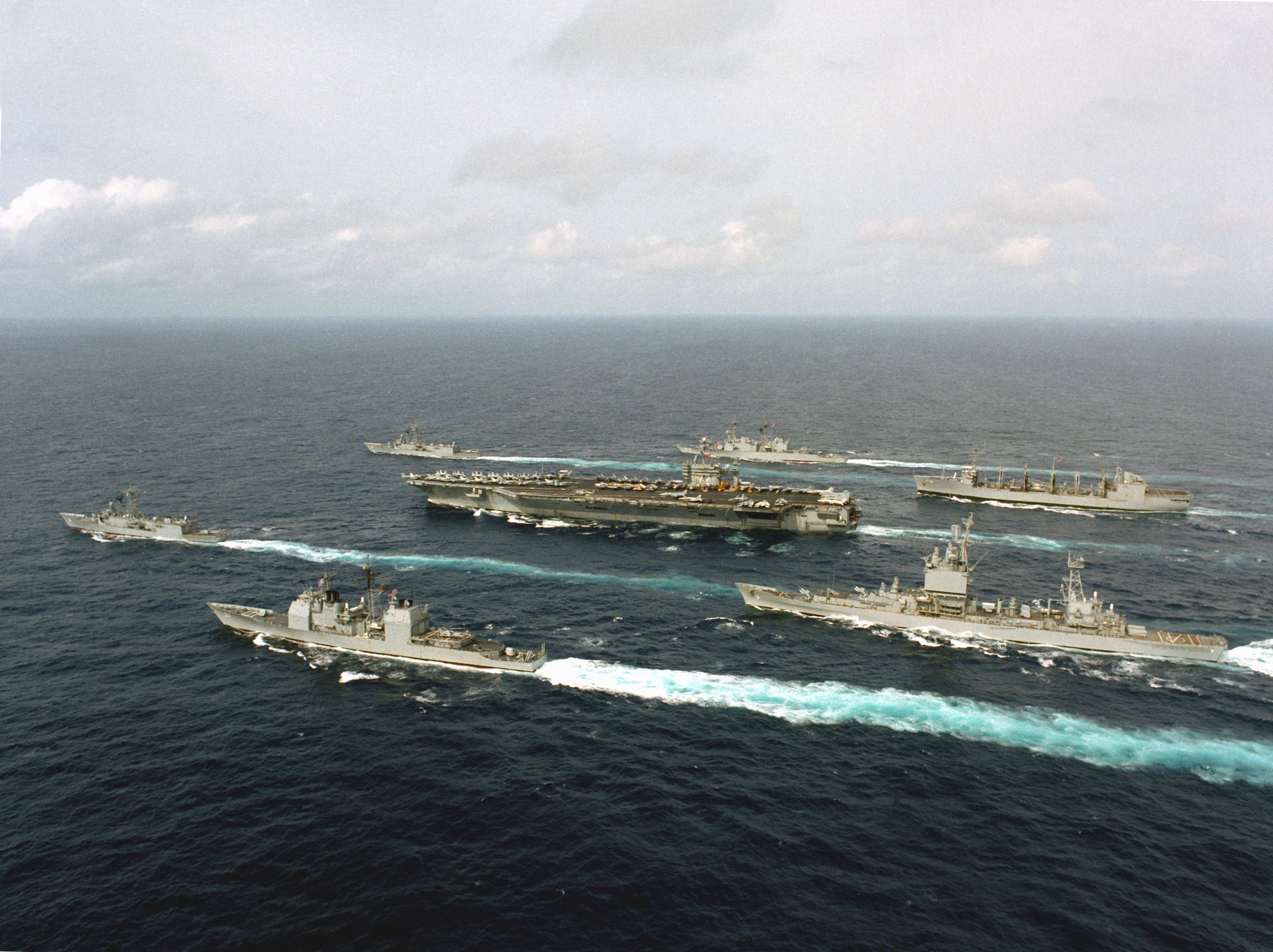
Abraham Carrier Battle group shortly before Operation Fiery Vigil, 1991

While heading towards the Indian Ocean, the ship was diverted to support evacuation operations after Mount Pinatubo erupted on Luzon Island in the Philippines. In support of Operation Fiery Vigil, Abraham Lincoln led a 23-ship armada that moved over 45,000 people from the Subic Bay Naval Station to the port of Cebu in the Visayas. It was the largest peacetime evacuation of active military personnel and their families in history.

One baby was born onboard Abraham Lincoln during the evacuation. His mother named him Abraham Lincoln Prestera. After Fiery Vigil, Abraham Lincoln steamed toward the Persian Gulf, to run reconnaissance and combat air patrols in Iraq and Kuwait, assisting allied and US troops involved with Desert Storm. In early 1992, the ship was at Naval Air Station Alameda, on Ship's Restricted Availability for minor maintenance and refitting.

From June 1993, Abraham Lincoln was the flagship of Commander, Carrier Group Three. In October 1993, the carrier was ordered to the coast of Somalia to assist United Nations humanitarian operations. For four weeks, Abraham Lincoln flew air patrols over Mogadishu in support of Operation Restore Hope.

USS Abahram Lincoln Flight Operations Support during Operation Epic Fury on March 2nd

Abraham Lincoln was the first Pacific Fleet carrier to integrate female aviators into the crew after the Combat Exclusion Laws were lifted on 28 April 1993. The ship left San Diego on 24 October 1994, to begin refresher training. The next day, Lieutenant Kara Spears Hultgreen, the first female F-14 Tomcat pilot, died when her plane crashed into the sea. Her F-14 suffered a compressor stall as she made her final approach, losing power to one of the engines. She aborted the landing to the best of her ability in an effort to prevent a collision with the aft end of the ship, and the plane inverted and went into the ocean. Radar intercept officer Lieutenant Matthew Klemish ejected safely from the plane, and was rescued from the water minutes later. Hultgreen, who was automatically ejected 0.4 seconds after Klemish, rocketed straight into the ocean and was instantly killed. Her body, still strapped in the ejection seat, was recovered 19 days later.

In February 1995, while maneuvering in fog off San Diego, Abraham Lincoln accidentally entered the racing area for the 1995 Louis Vuitton Cup, causing a yacht race in progress to be canceled.

Abraham Lincoln's third deployment began in April 1995 when she was sent to the Persian Gulf and took part in Operation Southern Watch and in Operation Vigilant Sentinel. During an underway replenishment, Abraham Lincoln was run into by USS Sacramento, when the latter had steering difficulties due to a split rudder, impacting Sacramento's port side, crushing the M-frames, partially crushing a female crew berthing area, and punching a large hole in Abraham Lincoln's superstructure, impacting the meteorology compartment. Abraham Lincoln was able to continue on with her mission, while Sacramento had to dock at Jebel Ali, United Arab Emirates, for several weeks for repair.

In June 1998, Abraham Lincoln began a fourth deployment. Once again, the ship headed for the Persian Gulf in support of Operation Southern Watch. Abraham Lincoln was awarded the Armed Forces Expeditionary Medal, and Abraham Lincoln carrier battle group the Meritorious Unit Commendation ribbon.

=== 2000s ===
The carrier's fifth deployment commenced in August 2000, when Abraham Lincoln again traveled to the Persian Gulf in support of Southern Watch. On this deployment, the carrier, air wing, and battle group ships earned the Navy Meritorious Unit Commendation. The ship earned the Arleigh Burke Fleet Trophy as the most improved command in the Pacific Fleet.

Abraham Lincoln was in port during the September 11 attacks. The carrier was put to sea on 20 July 2002 to support Operation Enduring Freedom. She took up station once more in support of Operation Southern Watch before taking a port visit to Fremantle, Western Australia. During this time, Abraham Lincoln was ordered to the Persian Gulf to take part in Operation Iraqi Freedom. This forced the Navy to extend Abraham Lincoln's stay from 20 January to 6 May 2003.

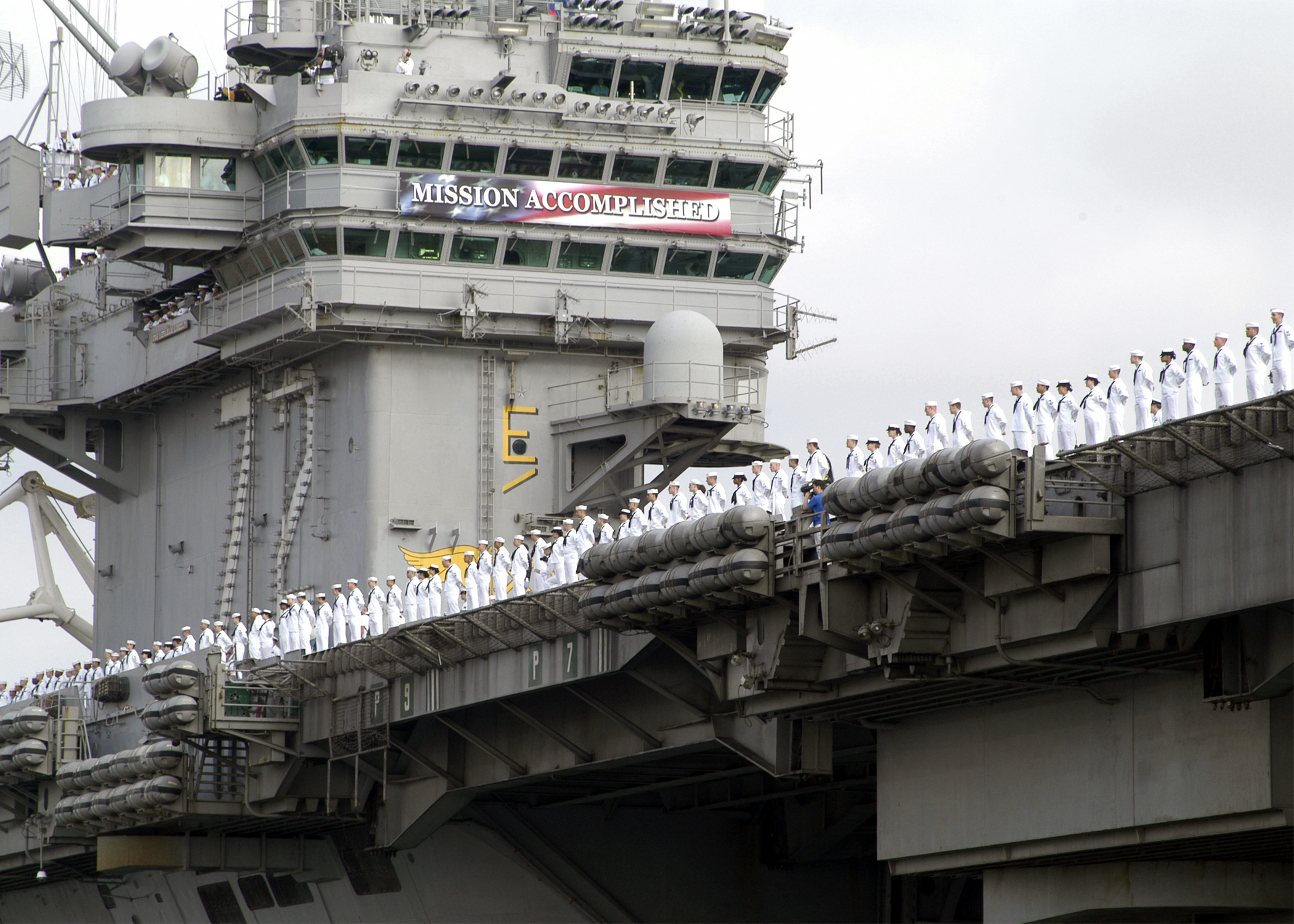
Abraham Lincoln returning to port carrying the Mission Accomplished banner, 2 May 2003

Abraham Lincoln and the carrier battle group and air wing helped deliver the opening salvos and air strikes in Operation Iraqi Freedom. During the air wing's deployment, some 16,500 sorties were flown and 1.6 million pounds of ordnance were used. Sea Control Squadron 35 (VS-35), the "Blue Wolves", was instrumental in delivering over 1,000,000 pounds (450,000 kg) of fuel to these strike aircraft, one of the largest aerial refueling undertakings by a carrier aviation squadron in history.

In May 2003, the carrier returned home, receiving a visit from President George W. Bush before officially ending Abraham Lincoln's deployment by docking at San Diego, before returning to homeport in Everett, Washington. Bush stated at the time that this was the end to major combat operations in Iraq. While this statement did coincide with an end to the conventional phase of the war, Bush's assertion—and a sign displayed during his visit—became controversial after guerrilla warfare in Iraq increased during the Iraqi insurgency. The vast majority of casualties, both military and civilian, occurred after the speech.

The White House said their services constructed the banner. As explained by Commander Conrad Chun, a Navy spokesman, "The banner was a Navy idea, the ship's idea. The idea popped up in one of the meetings aboard the ship preparing for her homecoming and thought it would be good to have a banner, 'Mission Accomplished.' The sailors then asked if the White House could get the sign made. The banner signified the successful completion of the ship's deployment," Cmdr. Chun continued, noting that Abraham Lincoln was deployed 290 days, longer than any other nuclear-powered aircraft carrier in history. This record was broken in 2020.

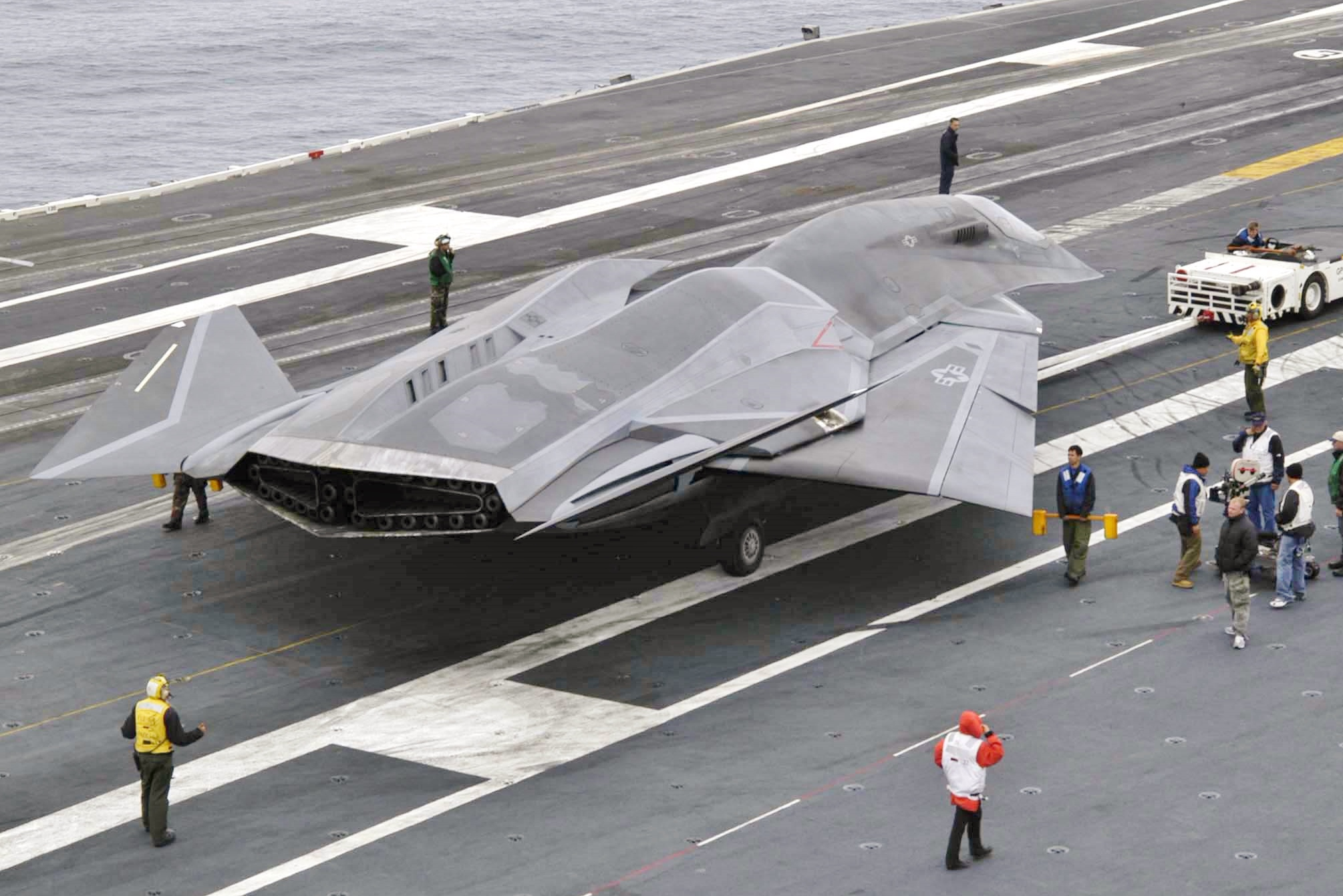
A mock-up of the fictional F/A-37 Talon aboard Abraham Lincoln during production of the film Stealth, 2004

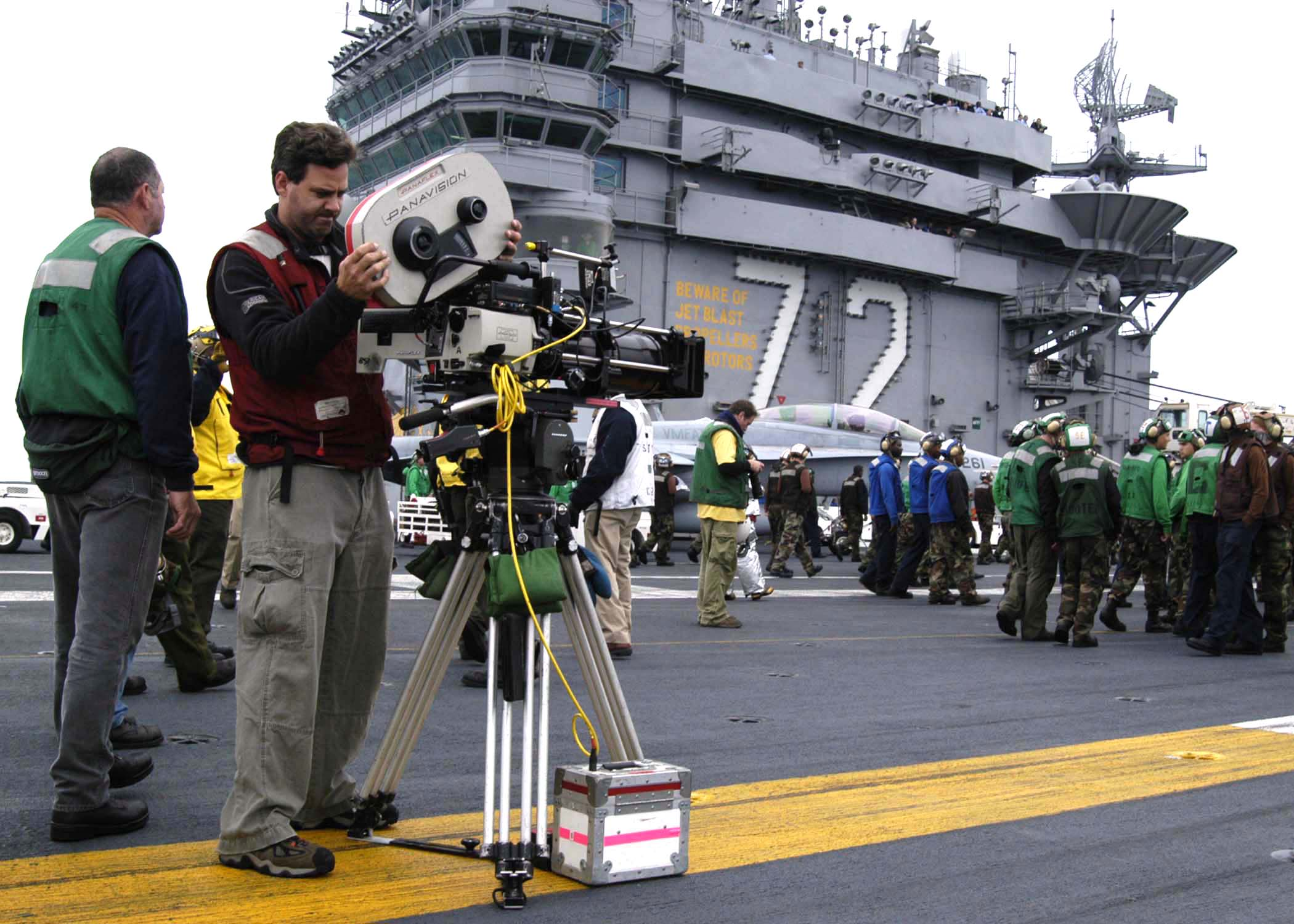
A camera crew sets up for scenes from the movie Stealth to be filmed on the flight deck with the crew

In June 2004, following a ten-month docking period, the ship put to sea for the start of working up prior to deployment. During this period, a film crew was hosted aboard to produce scenes for the film Stealth, which included the presence of a full-scale model of a fictional aircraft, the F/A-37 Talon, that would feature as operating from the carrier. On 1 October 2004, the carrier's controlling formation was re-designated from Cruiser-Destroyer Group Three to Carrier Strike Group Nine. Abraham Lincoln departed for her next voyage on 15 October 2004.

On 26 December 2004, the carrier was on a port call in Hong Kong when the 9.0-magnitude 2004 Indian Ocean earthquake struck southern Asia. To help with the international relief effort and assist with search and rescue efforts already underway, Carrier Strike Group 9, led by Abraham Lincoln deployed to the hard-hit western coast of Sumatra and Aceh in Indonesia to provide humanitarian assistance as part of Operation Unified Assistance. Abraham Lincoln's Air Transportation Office coordinated the flow of supplies into the region, and the carrier provided air traffic control for the relief effort. Sailors from Abraham Lincoln's Engineering Department Repair Division designed a potable water manifold to help bring fresh water to Aceh Province, Sumatra, with the system beginning to ship the much-needed fresh water on 4 January.

In total, Carrier Strike Group Three delivered 5,929,000 pounds (2,689,000 kg) of relief and humanitarian supplies, including 2,915,500 pounds (1,322,400 kg) of food and 748,410 pounds (339,470 kg) of medical supplies, during Operation Unified Assistance. Carrier Strike Group Three received the Humanitarian Service Medal in recognition of its humanitarian assistance/disaster response (HA/DR) efforts during the OUA mission.

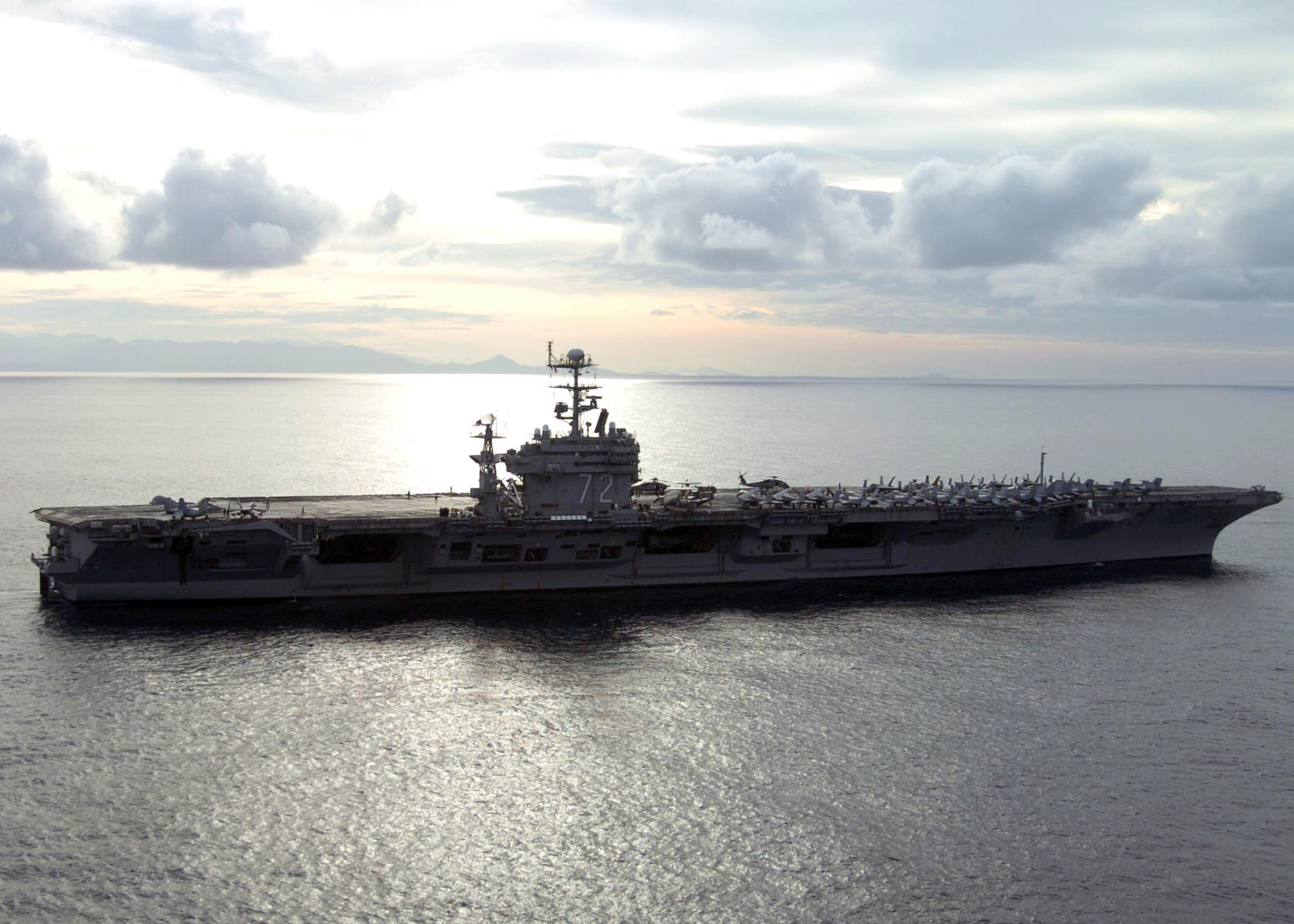
Abraham Lincoln off the coast of Sumatra, Indonesia. January 2005

In mid-January 2005, the carrier left Indonesian waters after the Indonesian government refused to allow fighter pilots assigned to Abraham Lincoln to conduct air patrols and training flights. By law, US carrier-based pilots must practice at least once every two to three weeks to remain "fit", otherwise they are grounded. Despite the move into international waters, Abraham Lincoln continued to provide support to the region until 4 February.

During the carrier's 33 days on station, she, along with her battle group, Carrier Strike Group Nine delivered 5.7 million pounds of relief supplies. The 17 helicopters assigned to HSL-47 Saberhawks and HS-2 "Golden Falcons", attached to CVW-2 flew 1,747 relief missions along the western coast of Sumatra. The carrier's departure coincided with the arrival of the hospital ship Mercy.

Between 7 March and 27 May 2005, Abraham Lincoln underwent a docking planned incremental availability yard overhaul at Naval Station Everett, Washington, and following subsequent sustainment training, the carrier underwent an additional planned incremental availability at NS Everett between 28 June and 26 August 2005. Between 1 and 23 June 2005, Abraham Lincoln and Carrier Air Wing Two (CVW-2) trained in the northern Pacific, conducting their quarterly Integrated Strike Group (ISG) Sustainment Training cycle.

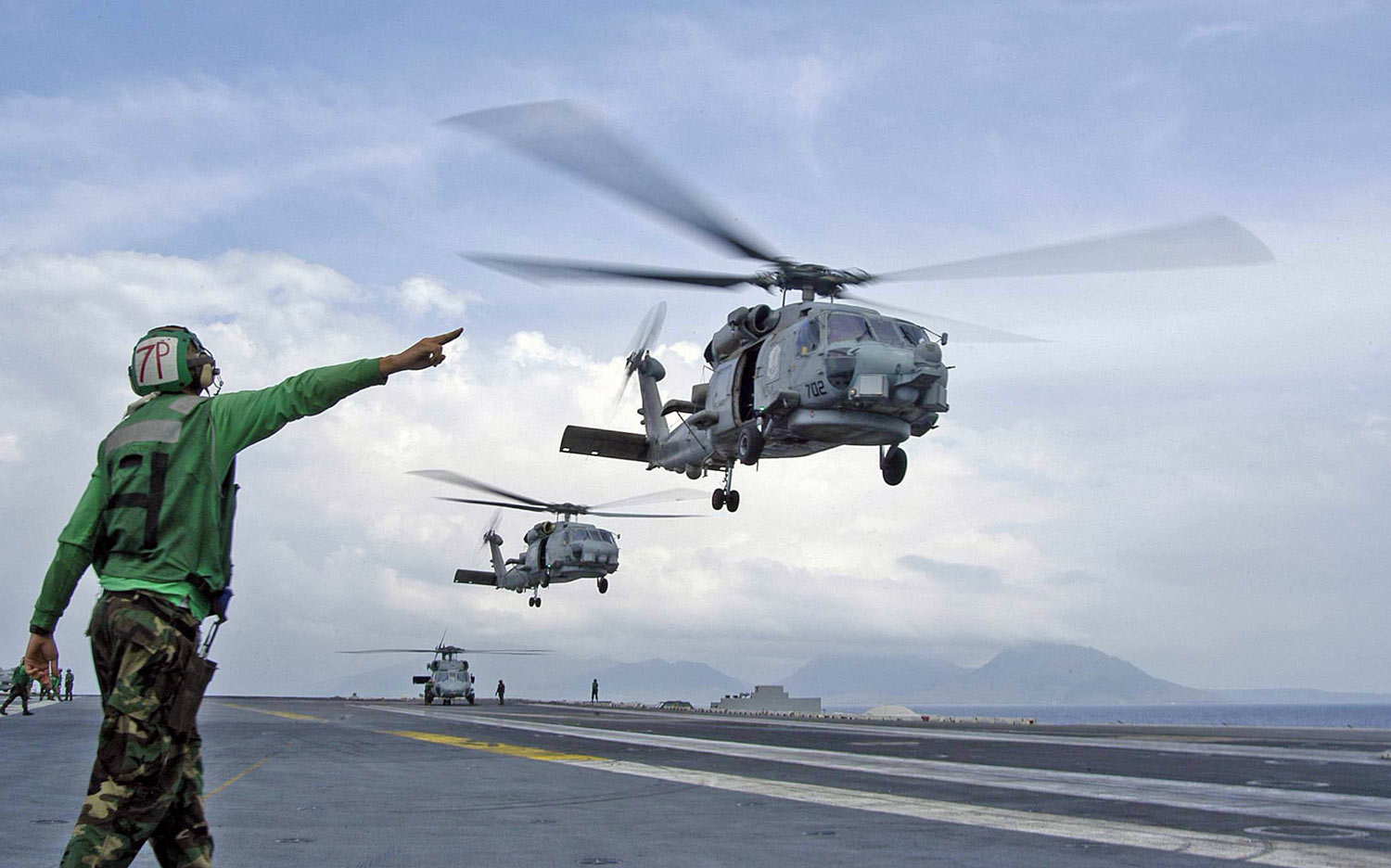
Helicopters depart from Abraham Lincoln en route to Aceh, Sumatra, supporting humanitarian airlifts to tsunami-stricken coastal regions, early 2005

Abraham Lincoln carried out surge sustainment training for the Fleet Response Plan, fleet replacement squadron carrier qualifications, and Joint Task Force Exercise 2005 in southern Californian waters between 19 October and 16 November 2005. For JTFEX-05, Abraham Lincoln and Carrier Air Wing Two were joined by the guided-missile cruiser Mobile Bay; the guided-missile destroyers Russell and Shoup, and Carrier Strike Group Seven led by the nuclear-powered aircraft carrier USS Ronald Reagan.

On 5 January 2006, the carrier Abraham Lincoln departed her homeport of Everett and transited to San Diego, California, for a scheduled underway period to undertake sustainment training exercises and post-refit inspection by the US Navy's Board of Inspection and Survey which were completed from 21 to 24 February.

On 29 August 2006, Abraham Lincoln arrived at Naval Base Kitsap in Bremerton, Washington, and on 8 September 2006, the carrier entered Dry Dock No. 6 at the Puget Sound Naval Shipyard and Intermediate Maintenance Facility to begin a scheduled Docked Planned Incremental Availability (DPIA) yard maintenance period. Major projects for this DPIA included the refurbishment of ship tanks, work on three of the four catapults, modernization of navigation systems, resurfacing of the flight deck, and updates to the ship's local area network. Abraham Lincoln also received installation of the RIM-116 Rolling Airframe Missile system, which improved the ship's close-range defensive capabilities. On 18 December 2006, Abraham Lincoln left dry dock ahead of schedule and under budget because the PSNS and IMF yard teams were able to cut the time of ship tank maintenance by more than half, completing 18 tanks in 89 days.

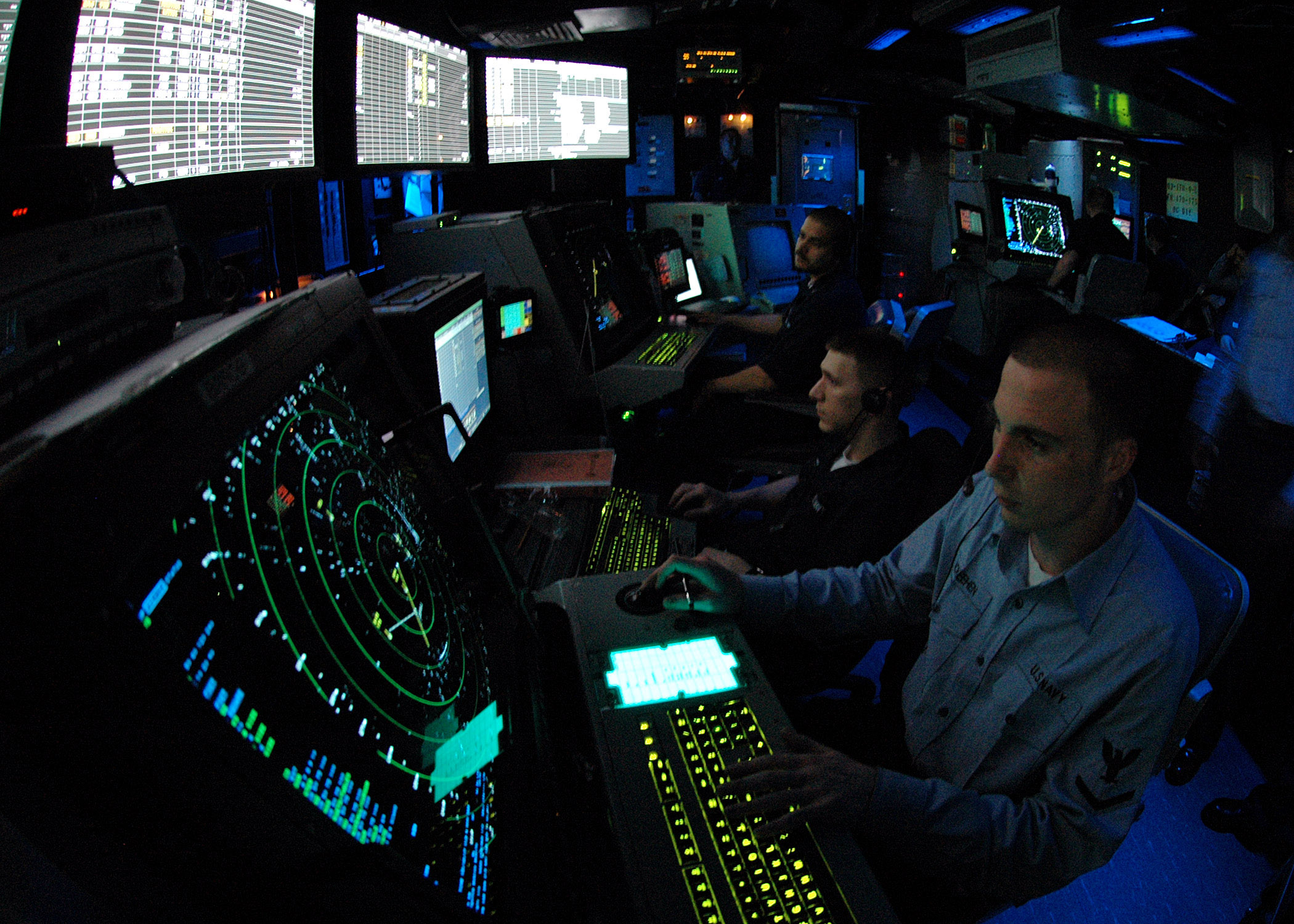
An air traffic controller works approach control in Carrier Air Traffic Control Center aboard the Nimitz-class aircraft carrier USS Abraham Lincoln in 2006

From 23 to 25 June 2007, Abraham Lincoln held a fast cruise from the pier and left Puget Sound on 26 June to conduct sea trials. On 30 June 2007, Lincoln returned to her homeport of Naval Station Everett. Abraham Lincoln underwent flight deck carrier qualifications while sailing in southern Californian waters 12–15 July . F/A-18E Super Hornets and F/A-18C Hornets from strike squadrons VFA-137 and VFA-151 joined VX-23 test pilots performed precision approach drills to ensure that the ship's equipment, such as the Precision Approach Landing System, operated within close tolerances, with SH-60B Seahawks from squadron HS-2 providing search and rescue capabilities during flight operations.

On 20 August 2007, Abraham Lincoln and embarked Carrier Air Wing Two completed their 25-day Tailored Ship's Training Availability (TSTA) and Final Evaluation Problem (FEP) training period off southern California. TSTA is designed to prepare the ship and crew for full integration into a carrier strike group, and FEP is a graded 48-hour evolution to evaluate how well the units learned during TSTA. Abraham Lincoln and embarked CVW-2 aircraft conducted over 1,000 fixed-wing sorties. Abraham Lincoln completed five replenishments-at-sea evolutions, including two with the fleet replenishment oiler Henry J. Kaiser, and participated in 18 general quarters (GQ) drills. On 13 August, Abraham Lincoln tested her defensive capabilities when she fired four RIM-7P NATO Sea Sparrow missiles, with two of them at BQM-74E Chukar remote-operated aerial target drones.

Carrier Strike Group Nine's Composite Unit Training Exercise featured 24 sailors from Mobile Security Squadron 2 (MSRON-2), Helicopter Visit, Board, Search and Seizure Team 1, a first for West Coast-based U.S. Navy ships. MSRON-2 Team 1 specializes in boarding noncompliant ships at sea in the dead of night, detaining the crew if necessary, and identifying suspected terrorists or subjects of interest, using the element of surprise afforded by helicopter insertion, night vision equipment, and state-of-the-art biometrics. MSRON-2 Team 1 was established in 2004 at Norfolk Naval Shipyard in Portsmouth, Virginia, and it was the first team of its kind to reach operational status.

On 11 November 2007, an HH-60H Seahawk helicopter from squadron HS-2 crashed while operating from the ship about 100 miles (160 km) from San Diego. Rescuers successfully pulled all seven crewmembers from the water.

Between 3 and 30 January 2008, Carrier Strike Group Nine conducted anti-submarine exercises and Joint Task Force Exercise 03-08 (JTFEx 03–08) off southern California. On 16 January, Secretary of the Navy Donald C. Winter visited Abraham Lincoln. On 20 January, a NATO Boeing E-3A Sentry Airborne Warning and Control System aircraft was deployed from NATO Air Base Geilenkirchen, Germany, with a multinational crew aboard for JTFEx 03–08, defended Carrier Strike Group Nine from a simulated air attack (30 January).

Abraham Lincoln began a planned incremental availability maintenance cycle at the Puget Sound Naval Shipyard in Bremerton, on 16 April 2009. The objective of this cycle is to refurbish Abraham Lincoln's shipboard system to meet the anticipated 50-year service life of the ship, including an upgraded local area network system. Beginning 1 December, Abraham Lincoln began daily flying squad, general quarters, and integrated training team drills in preparation for her first underway period following the ship's current maintenance cycle.

=== 2010 ===
On 13 January 2010, the carrier completed upgrades and repair that cost $250 million at Puget Sound Naval Shipyard. The carrier was to be assigned to Carrier Strike Group Nine. On 3 February 2011, the ship was awarded the Battle Effectiveness Award for high standards of excellence and combat readiness.

On 9 December 2010, the US Navy officially announced that Naval Station Everett, Washington, was the new homeport for USS Nimitz, replacing Abraham Lincoln, which would be undergoing a scheduled refueling and complex overhaul (RCOH) at the Northrop Grumman Shipbuilding-Newport News shipyard in Virginia, which was slated to begin in 2013.

=== 2011 ===
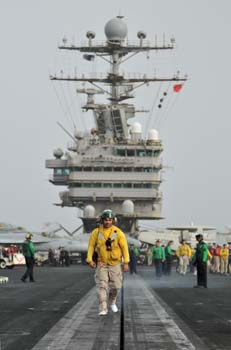
A catapult officer inspects the catapult track prior to flight operations on Abraham Lincoln with fellow shipmates in the background

On 1 March 2011, the news media reported that the US Navy had awarded Northrop Grumman Shipbuilding-Newport News a US$206.7 million option under a previously awarded contract to plan Abraham Lincoln's RCOH. The planning contract covered the design, documentation, engineering, advanced material procurement, inspections, fabrication, and support work for Abraham Lincoln's RCOH, with more than 1,000 employees supporting this planning phase. Additional funding for the RCOH was pending the passage of the U.S. Department of Defense's Fiscal Year 2011 budget appropriations by the U.S. Congress. Upon authorization, Abraham Lincoln's RCOH was anticipated to begin in 2013, and was scheduled to take between three and four years to complete at an estimated overall cost of US$3 billion.

On 1 August, the US Navy announced that Abraham Lincoln would shift homeport from Everett to Newport News for a scheduled RCOH in August 2012. The ship departed Everett for the deployment that would take the carrier around the world to Newport News in December 2011.

=== 2012 ===
From 6–10 January 2012, accompanied by guided missile cruiser Cape St. George, Abraham Lincoln visited the Gulf of Thailand port of Laem Chabang. During the visit, Singapore-based Glenn Defense Marine Asia provided husbanding services, for which the Navy was billed $884,000. In November 2013, federal prosecutors charged that the Navy had been overbilled more than $500,000.

On 22 January, the US Navy announced that Abraham Lincoln had entered the Persian Gulf "without incident." The deployment through the Straits of Hormuz came at a time of escalating tensions with Iran. Abraham Lincoln, accompanied by a strike group of warships, was the first U.S. aircraft carrier to enter the Persian Gulf since late December 2011 and was on a "routine rotation" to replace the outgoing USS John C. Stennis. The departure of John C. Stennis prompted Iranian army chief Ataollah Salehi to threaten action if another carrier passed back into the Persian Gulf, saying, "I recommend and emphasize to the American carrier not to return to the Persian Gulf. ... We are not in the habit of warning more than once," The US dismissed the warning.

In June, the actors, crew and producers of the film, Abraham Lincoln: Vampire Hunter attended an unconventional preview screening for the over eighteen hundred sailors aboard the namesake vessel of the 16th president. The event marked the first time a major motion picture had its debut screening for troops deployed in the Middle East.

Abraham Lincoln transited the Suez Canal northbound on 16 July and the Strait of Gibraltar on 26 July en route to the United States. On 7 August, Abraham Lincoln arrived at Norfolk Naval Station following an eight-month deployment to the US Navy's 5th, 6th and 7th Fleet areas of responsibility, in preparation for the Refueling and Complex Overhaul (RCOH) at Newport News.

=== 2013 ===
On 8 February 2013, the U.S. Department of Defense announced that the scheduled mid-life Refueling and Complex Overhaul intended for Abraham Lincoln would be postponed pending the resolution of the upcoming budget sequestration. This budget shortfall would affect Abraham Lincoln's refueling of her nuclear propulsion plant, and delay the next scheduled mid-life complex overhaul involving George Washington forward-based in Yokosuka, Japan, and the de-fueling of the recently deactivated Enterprise. By March 2013, Naval ship maintenance and overhaul budget issues had been addressed enough such that Abraham Lincoln's RCOH had been confirmed. The ship was made ready to tow over to Newport News Shipbuilding. By mid-March she had been towed over and docked, and the RCOH work began.

=== 2014 ===
On 3 October 2014, Huntington Ingalls Newport News Shipbuilding said that its workers had transferred a 30-ton anchor from Enterprise, the Navy's first and oldest nuclear carrier, to be installed aboard Abraham Lincoln during that week. The transfer was a result of an anchor replacement on Abraham Lincoln coinciding with the withdrawal of Enterprise, preserving the anchor rather than it being scrapped with the rest of the ship.

=== 2017 ===
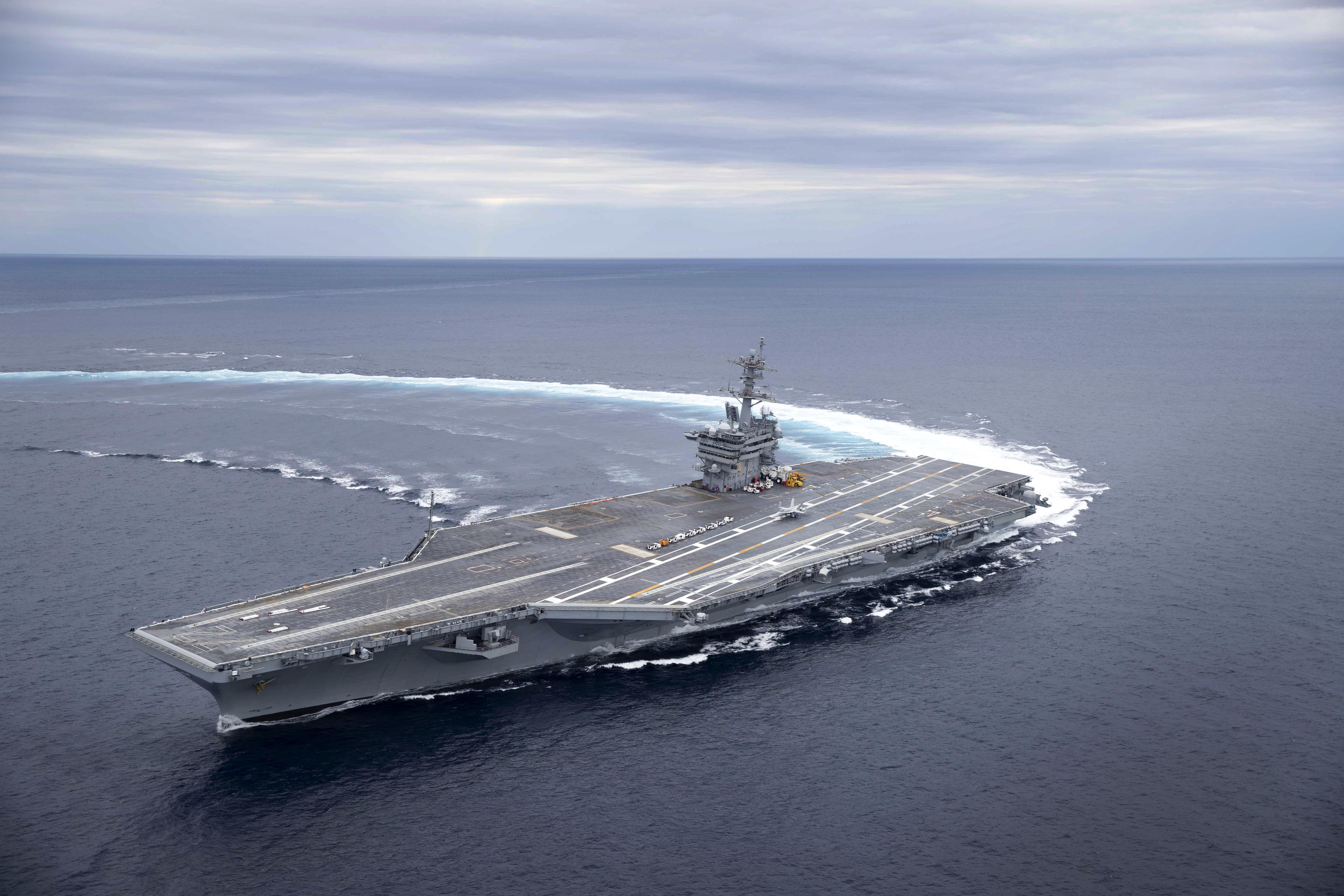
Abraham Lincoln carries out a high-speed turn during sea trials, May 2017

On 9 May 2017, Abraham Lincoln got underway for sea trials, following the four-year refueling and complex overhaul. More than 2.5 million man-hours of work were conducted aboard the ship, including refueling the reactors, upgrading ship's infrastructure and modernizing combat systems and air wing capabilities to increase combat effectiveness.

On 12 May, Abraham Lincoln was redelivered to the fleet. On 8 September Abraham Lincoln was deployed with USS Iwo Jima and USS New York to provide aid to Florida following the Hurricane Irma disaster. The vessels joined USS Farragut already on station.

=== 2018 ===
On 2 August 2018, it was announced that Abraham Lincoln would return to San Diego as part of a home port shift for three carriers, thus returning her to the Pacific Fleet. At the end of August, VFA-125 began operating from Abraham Lincoln as an integrated part of CVW-7, the first time that the F-35C had operated integrated cyclic operations, simulating the full spectrum of planned operations.

Also in August, a movie crew was aboard filming flight deck operations and flying sequences for the sequel Top Gun: Maverick off the coast of Virginia.

=== 2019 ===
On 1 April 2019, Abraham Lincoln and Carrier Strike Group 12 departed Norfolk for a six-month deployment that was expected to end with a shift of homeport to San Diego. On 9 April she arrived in the United States Sixth Fleet area of operations, where she would operate in the Mediterranean Sea before proceeding to the Persian Gulf, then the Indian Ocean and the South China Sea, before heading across the Pacific Ocean to her new homeport in San Diego.

On 23 April, Abraham Lincoln was reported to have operated simultaneously along with John C. Stennis in the Mediterranean Sea, the two carrier strike groups' operations including more than 130 aircraft, 10 ships, and 9,000 sailors and marines, according to the press release published by the U.S. Naval Forces Europe-Africa/US 6th Fleet. The operations were observed from the aircraft carrier by U.S. Ambassador to Russia, Jon Huntsman and Admiral James Foggo, commander, U.S. Naval Forces Europe-Africa and Joint Force Command Naples.

While aboard, Huntsman said: "Diplomatic communication and dialogue coupled with the strong defense these ships provide demonstrate to Russia that if it truly seeks better relations with the United States, it must cease its destabilizing activities around the world." On 5 May this deployment was diverted to the Middle East due to tensions with Iran and headed to the Persian Gulf. Her transit was expedited by omitting a port visit to Split, Croatia.

In October, it was revealed that Abraham Lincoln's Middle East deployment would be extended due to an electrical malfunction on USS Harry S Truman.

=== 2020 ===
Abraham Lincoln arrived in her new home port in San Diego on 20 January following 295 days at sea. This broke the ship's own record for the longest post-Cold War era deployment for a US carrier ship.

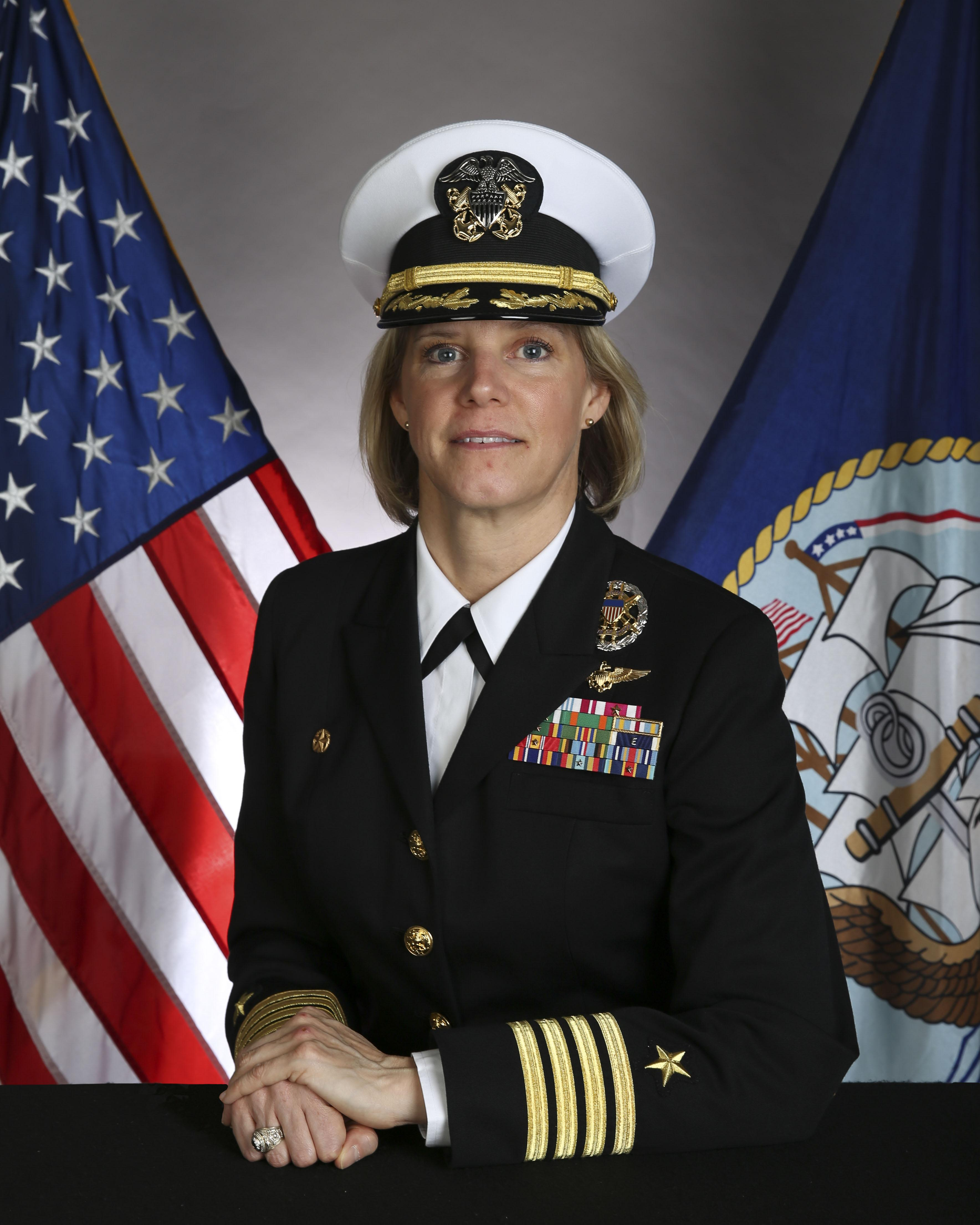
Captain Amy Bauernschmidt in 2019

On 18 December, the Navy announced Captain Amy Bauernschmidt would take command of Abraham Lincoln in the summer of 2021, the first time a woman would command an aircraft carrier.

=== 2021 ===
On 19 August, Captain Bauernschmidt, who previously served as the carrier's executive officer from 2016 to 2019, relieved Captain Walt Slaughter at a change of command ceremony in San Diego.

On 31 August, an MH-60S Knighthawk helicopter, embarked aboard Abraham Lincoln, crashed into the Pacific Ocean at approximately 4:30 pm (PDT) while conducting routine flight operations, approximately 60 nautical miles (110 km) off the coast of San Diego. Five crew members were killed. One was rescued during search and rescue operations.

=== 2022 ===
On 4 January, Marine Fighter Attack Squadron 314 (VMFA-314) became the first Marine Corps F-35C squadron to be deployed on an aircraft carrier.

On 21 May, Abraham Lincoln steamed into Tokyo Bay to relieve USS Ronald Reagan. The Abraham Lincoln carrier strike group was scheduled to participate in RIMPAC 2022.

On 21 September, the water onboard was discovered to be contaminated. Reports were made to the chain of command onboard but the commanding officer, Captain Bauernschmidt, did not inform the crew until the following day, almost 24 hours after initial reports were made. Reports continued throughout the evening, but actions by the engineering staff did little. The contaminated tank was even reintroduced back into service after being taken offline earlier in the day. Test reports of seven water samples revealed the presence of E. coli. Upon receipt of the test results, Captain Bauernschmidt told the crew of the contamination followed by, "before anybody starts freaking out, E. coli is an extremely common bacteria. Matter of fact, every single person on this ship has it in their digestive system right now."

On 11 November, Abraham Lincoln hosted a college basketball game on her deck between Gonzaga University and Michigan State University, won 64–63 by Gonzaga. The carrier suffered a minor fire that injured nine sailors on 29 November. The cause is unknown and an investigation was launched.

=== 2024 ===
On 2 August, the Abraham Lincoln carrier strike group was ordered by Defense Secretary Lloyd Austin to relieve USS Theodore Roosevelt operating in the Gulf of Oman, joining other US naval forces in the region as a deterrent against potential Iranian aggression against Israel. On 21 August, the U.S. Central Command announced that the vessel had arrived in the Middle East. Austin had ordered her to speed up to help Israel in case of a potential attack from Iran.

On 9 November, Marine F-35Cs from Abraham Lincoln carried out strikes on the Houthi movement in Yemen in the context of the Red Sea crisis.

On 12 November, the Yemeni Houthi group announced the launch of two military operations described as "qualitative" in the Red and Arabian Seas that lasted eight hours, targeting an aircraft carrier and two US destroyers. At least eight drones, five anti-ship ballistic missiles and three anti-ship cruise missiles were aimed at USS Stockdale and USS Spruance. All missiles were intercepted or did not hit their targets. There were no injuries or damage to the two destroyers.

Houthi spokesman Brigadier General Yahya Saree claimed the attack on the two destroyers was successful in a post on social media site X. Saree also said the Houthis attacked Abraham Lincoln in the Arabian Sea. Pentagon Press Secretary Major General Patrick S. Ryder said he was not aware of any attacks against the aircraft carrier. Supporters of the Houthis and many Indonesian and Singaporean news outlets made false claims about Abraham Lincoln being "damaged and returning home", and even going as far as to say it had sunk. Additional false claims of having damaged or sunk the aircraft carriers USS Dwight D. Eisenhower and USS Theodore Roosevelt were made by social media users. As of November 2024, there had been no reports of damage to US warships by Houthi attacks.

=== 2026 ===
On 8 January 2026, the carrier took part in a military exercise in the South China Sea, meant to test the Phalanx CIWS in the context of close-range aerial and surface threats. Then, following the protests and massacres in Iran, along with growing tension between Iran and the US, the carrier was reported heading to the Middle East, leaving the South China Sea. According to reports it deployed in the Middle East on 26 January and Trump declared it would hold multi-day aerial military drills on 27 January. It was expected to enter the Strait of Hormuz by 29 January.

On 3 February 2026, while the Lincoln was traveling in the Arabian Sea approximately 500 miles (800 km) from Iran's southern coast, an Iranian Shahed 139 drone flew toward the ship; a US F-35 shot it down.

On 1 March, the IRGC said the Lincoln was struck by four ballistic missiles. The Pentagon rejected these claims saying the ballistic missiles "weren't even close" to hitting their intended target. On 5 March, the Iranian military again stated that it had struck the Lincoln with a series of drone strikes. Iran would make a third claim on 25 March by firing Qader cruise missiles. The ship was not harmed in all three cases. On 29 March, Shahram Irani, commander of the Iranian navy, threatened the Lincoln if it entered missile range.

Also on 1 March, The New York Times reported that attacks by Iran damaged the US Navy's Naval Support Activity Bahrain base and others, forcing the US to seek and receive access from Great Britain to its base in Diego Garcia. Since that time the US Navy has used Naval Support Facility Diego Garcia as its main shipment point to its forces off Iran. This significantly lengthened the supply line to the Lincoln's operations in the Gulf of Oman as the Bahrain base is approximately 870 miles away, while Diego Garcia is much further at approximately 2,200 miles.

On 20 August The New York Times reported that the Lincoln had set sail that day for home and was expected in San Diego in four to five weeks. It was later reported that on the way home the Lincoln would finally have a port stop in Thailand in early September.The US was keeping twenty warships in The Persian Gulf, including two aircraft carriers, the USS George H. W. Bush and the USS George Washington.

On 22 August a report from The Central Oregon Daily News included a quote from Chief of Naval Operations Admiral Daryl Caudle during his visit on 3 June 2026, that the Lincoln "will probably, you know, change homeport to here as well", referring to Naval Base Kitsap in Washington State.

On September 2, 2026, Lincoln arrived in Thailand after 286 days at sea, including 208 consecutive days without a port call. The carrier spent about 200 days supporting U.S. operations against Iran, with significant corrosion visible on its exterior upon arrival.

==== Mental health on the Lincoln during Iran War ====
By early August 2026, the Lincoln had been to sea for over 260 days, including over 40 days of continuous combat operations, stopping in port only twice: once in Guam in December and in Oman in July. On 6 August, Navy leadership, including Acting Naval Secretary Hung Cao, attended a town hall at Naval Air Station North Island in San Diego with about 200 Lincoln family members who shared worries about mental health and exhaustion, and the risk of self-harm on the ship. Navy officials said they were working to send more mental health professionals to the Lincoln. On 10 August, Representative Mike Levin, a Democrat from California, posted on his X account in reference to what families had shared, and that conditions aboard the carrier included "moldy showers, broken toilets, laundry down for weeks, long stretches with no hot water, a meal that came down to half a cup of rice and two tortillas. No soap, deodorant, or toothpaste." He stated that when families raised the issues in April, Pete Hegseth dismissed reports as fake news.

On 11 August, Iranian media claimed that seven navy personnel died during a brawl on the ship, which CENTCOM denied.

By 12 August, several media outlets, including Stars and Stripes, reported that multiple sailors had made attempts to jump overboard the carrier due to poor conditions and mental stress. Defense Secretary Pete Hegseth said these reports "completely misrepresented" conditions aboard the ship, but did not directly respond to reports of deteriorating mental health and supply shortages. When asked whether he thought the Lincoln's deployment had gone on too long, President Donald Trump said "No. no. no. Not nearly long enough".

The US Navy denied there had been an increase of suicide attempts aboard the ship, while confirming one sailor went overboard in early August, was rescued, and received medical attention. On 26 August, MS NOW reported that a sailor who had jumped from the Lincoln in what his wife described as a suicide attempt was facing nonjudicial punishment by the Navy. Under Articles 83 and 86 of the Uniform Code of Military Justice the sailor was accused of "intentionally faking an illness or hurting themselves" and "absence without leave". Rep. Sara Jacobs, a member of the House Armed Services Committee, said that "No one should be punished for getting the mental health care they need."

Also on 12 August, Senator Richard Blumenthal of Connecticut, a Democrat and member of the Senate Armed Services Committee sent a letter to Defense Secretary Hegseth and Acting Naval Secretary Cao outlining a series of reported deficiencies aboard the Lincoln. The letter indicated that the aircraft carrier had been the subject of complaints including shortages of basic supplies, contaminated water, plumbing failures, declining mental health conditions, deck safety concerns, and a disrupted mail system that has resulted in many care packages being lost in transit for months. The letter raised many questions, including whether the Navy had the ability to maintain a carrier presence that could meet the Administration's demands.

On 13 August, it was reported that the aircraft carrier USS George Washington had left port the previous week from Da Nang, Vietnam, to replace the Lincoln amid reports of mental health issues.

On 16 August, CENTCOM posted a statement on social media from its commander, Admiral Brad Cooper, that he had visited the Lincoln. He wished the crew "fair winds and following seas on the way home". In reference to mental health issues aboard, he stated that "the Lincoln currently has among the lowest number of cases related to mental health" among the 11 active US carriers, indicating that the problem was worse on other aircraft carriers. On 18 August, Forbes reported that when asked by reporters, President Trump described the alleged mental health crisis aboard the Lincoln as a "fake CNN report", and that the ship was "beautifully maintained and beautifully taken care of."

On 17 August, USA Today reported that the loss of the US Navy's base in Bahrain resulted in the loss of a liberty port for the Lincoln's crew. A liberty port is a port where a crew can spend free time ashore. A Slate report on 19 August included a comment from a former senior Navy officer, who confirmed that the US could no longer send supply ships to Bahrain, which delayed the replenishment of ships in the region. A former Navy operations officer pointed out that some of the usual local vendors would have cut back on supplies due to fear of attack by Iran.

On 20 August CENTCOM posted that the George Washington had arrived in theater the day before. Its departure from the Western Pacific region left no US aircraft carrier there. On 22 August Senator Blumenthal's concern for its supply was noted as he stated "I have yet to be convinced that they have significantly improved the means and routes to supply the George Washington any better than they did with the Lincoln."

A 22 September letter from Acting Naval Secretary Cao reported eight suicide attempts among the broader strike group. CNN reported this as roughly in line with the average rate among active-duty Navy, while a US military official told CNN the number was "incredibly high" compared with other recent carrier strike group deployments.

On 6 October the U.S. Department of War announced that Secretary Hegseth would travel to San Diego to "welcome the USS Lincoln home tomorrow."

==== DHS detention of sailor's father ====
On Saturday 22 August, 2026, Luis Manula Aviles, the immigrant father of Joshua Aviles, a sailor on the Lincoln, was arrested by the Department of Homeland Security at a traffic stop in Key West, Florida, where the family lives. He would remain in ICE custody while the government sought to deport him. A DHS statement said that "having a family member in the military is not a free pass to violate our nation's laws", and included an offer to illegal aliens of "$2,600 and a free flight to self-deport now". Luis had been living in the United States for 20 years. His step-daughter, Katty Delgado stated Luis had a driver's license, a Social Security card, a work permit, and an active asylum case. He worked as a handyman. Delgado said she had no knowledge of an arrest history or any criminal allegations against him.

According to AP News, a well-publicized benefit of service is "military parole-in-place", which allows family of active-duty service members and veterans, with some exceptions, to obtain legal immigration status within the U.S. On 28 January 2026, an immigration judge terminated a deportation case against the Mexican father of three U.S. Marines, saying he had proven he was their father, making him eligible for lawful status.

On 25 August, Manula Aviles was released. Neither DHS nor ICE offered any comment at that time. On the weekend he had been detained, the Key West Immigrant Support Network had alerted residents of an "uptick in immigration activity" and a heightened Border Patrol presence.

== See also ==
- 2026 United States military buildup in the Middle East
- List of aircraft carriers
- List of aircraft carriers of the United States Navy
- Modern United States Navy carrier air operations

== Sources ==
- USS Abraham Lincoln (CVN-72) command histories – Naval History & Heritage Command

- 1989 Archived 5 November 2012 at the Wayback Machine
- 1990 Archived 5 November 2012 at the Wayback Machine
- 1991 Archived 5 November 2012 at the Wayback Machine
- 1992 Archived 5 November 2012 at the Wayback Machine
- 1993 Archived 5 November 2012 at the Wayback Machine
- 1994 Archived 5 November 2012 at the Wayback Machine
- 1995 Archived 13 October 2012 at the Wayback Machine
- 1996 Archived 5 November 2012 at the Wayback Machine
- 1997 Archived 16 September 2012 at the Wayback Machine
- 1998 Archived 5 November 2012 at the Wayback Machine
- 1999 Archived 5 November 2012 at the Wayback Machine
- 2001 Archived 5 November 2012 at the Wayback Machine
- 2002 Archived 5 November 2012 at the Wayback Machine
- 2003 Archived 15 September 2012 at the Wayback Machine
- 2004 Archived 31 January 2012 at the Wayback Machine

- g
