= Carrier Strike Group Three 2004–09 operations =

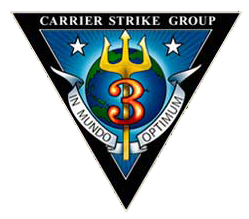
Carrier Strike Group Three crest

Carrier Strike Group Three 2004–2009 operations included a world cruise, three western Pacific (WESTPAC) deployments and a change-over of its flagship. During this period, CARSTRGRU-3 provided combat operational support for Operation Iraqi Freedom and Operation Enduring Freedom – Afghanistan (OEF-A) as well as participated such major exercises as Valiant Shield 2007, Key Resolve/Foal Eagle 2009, and Northern Edge 2009. The strike group's 2005 WESTPAC deployment marked the final overseas mission for Sea Control Squadron 33 (VS-33), the Screwbirds. Helicopter Maritime Strike Squadron 71 (HSM-71), a new component to Carrier Air Wing Nine (CVW-9), became the first squadron of its kind to embark on board a carrier as part of a carrier air wing when it operated with Carrier Strike Group Three during its 2009 WESTPAC deployment

Carrier Strike Group Three (CSG-3 or CARSTRGRU-3) is one of six U.S. Navy carrier strike groups currently assigned to the U.S. Pacific Fleet. CARSTRGRU-3 is currently based at Naval Base Kitsap, Washington, and it typically deploys to the U.S. Seventh Fleet operating in the Western Pacific (WESTPAC) and the U.S. Fifth Fleet in the Indian Ocean and the Persian Gulf. The Nimitz-class nuclear-powered aircraft carrier USS John C. Stennis (CVN-74) became the current flagship for Carrier Strike Group Three, replacing the USS Carl Vinson which began its 36-month mid-life refueling and complex overhaul in 2005.

== 2004 operations ==
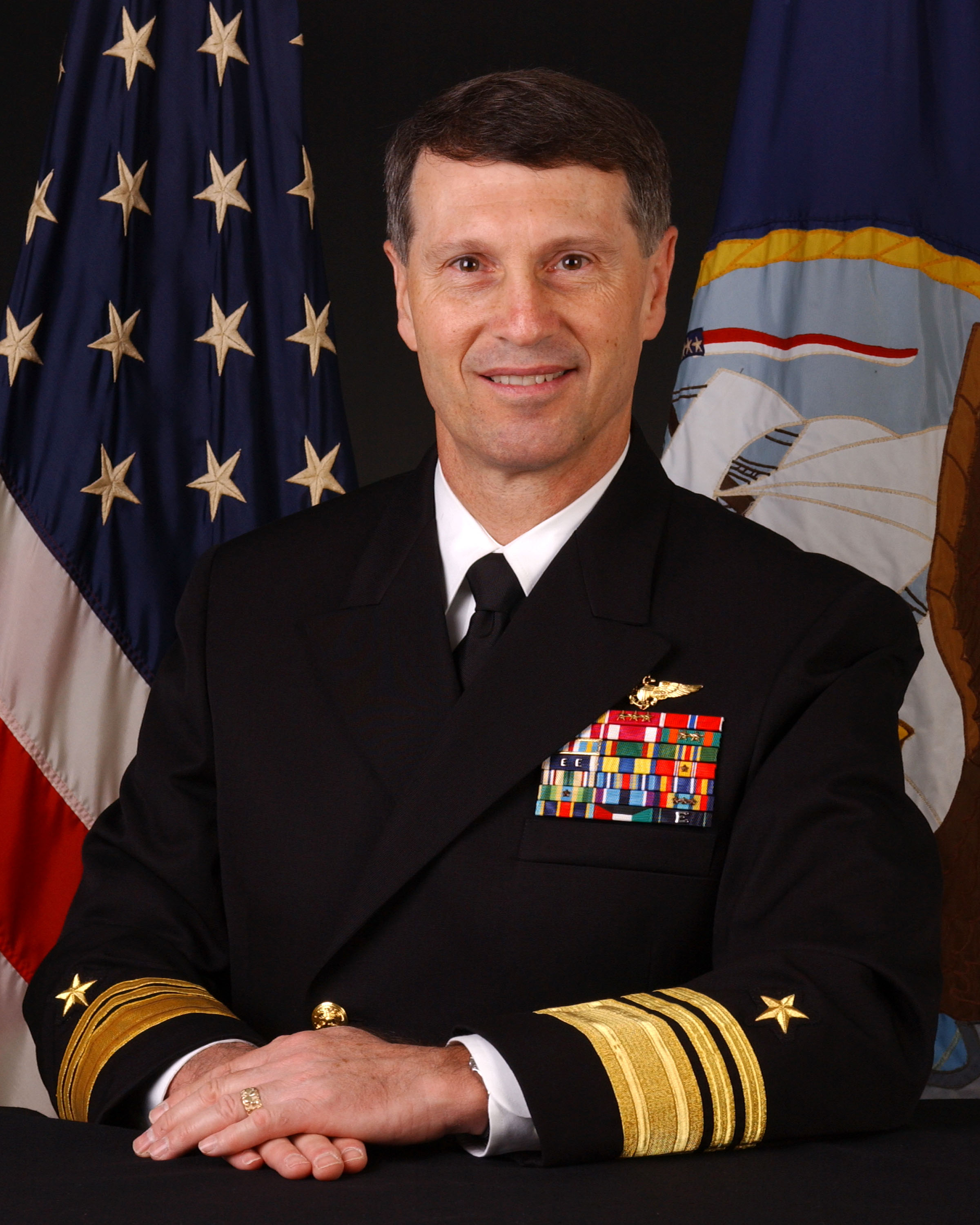
Adm. Bruce W. Clingan

=== Change of command ===
On 26 June 2004, Rear Admiral Bruce W. Clingan (pictured) relieved Rear Admiral Evan M. Chanik, Jr., as Commander Carrier Group Three (ComCarGru 3). During his tenure as ComCarGru 3, Chanik led the Carl Vinson strike group which was the first to undergo the new, innovative Inter-Deployment Training Cycle (IDTC), which greatly compressed the training required for oversea deployment. Admiral Chanik's next assignment was as director, Programming Division on the staff of the Chief of Naval Operations. A naval aviator, Admiral Clingan served as the commanding officer of U.S. Sixth Fleet flagship LaSalle and the aircraft carrier Carl Vinson, and prior to taking command of Carrier Group Three, he served as the deputy director of Operations, U.S. Central Command, during Operation Enduring Freedom – Afghanistan (OEF-A) and Operation Iraqi Freedom (OIF).

=== Pre-deployment training ===
In September 2004, Carrier Group Three (CarGru 3) departed for its 22-day Composite Training Unit Exercise (COMPTUEX) off the coast of Southern California. COMPUTEX was an intermediate-level, two-phase strike group training exercise that was a critical step toward the final certification to deploy overseas for a carrier strike group. Phase I provided training for warfare commanders and the rest of the strike group in operational tasking and decision-making. Phase II measured the ability of the strike group to act as a coordinated, combat-ready force, and it was intended to closely resemble real-life conflict. On 1 October 2004, Carrier Group Three was redesignated as Carrier Strike Group Three (CARSTRKGRU 3). A day later, on 2 October 2004, the newly renamed Carrier Strike Group Three completed its COMPTUEX.

== 2005 World Cruise ==
On 17 January 2005, Carl Vinson departed Bremerton, Washington, with CVW-9 embarked for a six-month deployment, which included several months in the Persian Gulf in support of Operation Iraqi Freedom. On 30 January 2005, COMCARSTKGRU 3 departed San Diego for its around the world voyage following the completion of Joint Task Force Exercise 05-2 (FTFE 05-2) under the command of Rear Admiral Bruce W. Clingan. This overseas deployment also marked the final overseas mission for the fast combat support ship Camden and Sea Control Squadron 33 (VS-33), the Screwbirds. The carrier strike group paid a port visit to Dubai.

On 5 May 2005, during a visit to strike group flagship Vinson on 5 May 2005, United States Central Command commander General John Abizaid paid tribute to the personnel of Carrier Strike Group Three: "Whenever I see young Marines and young Sailors at work where they are doing what their country’s asking them to do in a hard place, I can only come away thankful and impressed." Carrier Strike Group Three completed its 2005 western Pacific (WESTPAC) deployment and world cruise at Naval Station Norfolk, Virginia on 31 July 2005.

=== Force composition ===
Units	CARSTRKGRU 3 Warships/Units	Carrier Air Wing Nine (CVW-9) squadrons embarked aboard flagship USS Carl Vinson (CVN-70)	
No. 1	USS Antietam (CG-54)	Marine Fighter Attack Squadron 323 (VMFA-323): FA-18C(N) Hornet	Sea Control Squadron 33 (VS-33): S-3B Viking
No. 2	USS O'Kane (DDG-77)	Strike Fighter Squadron 154 (VVFA-154): F-18F Super Hornet	Helicopter Squadron 8 (HS-8): HH-60H/SH-60F Seahawk
No. 3	USS Mustin (DDG-89)	Strike Fighter Squadron 147 (VFA-147): FA-18C(N) Hornet	Fleet Logistics Support Squadron 40 (VRC-40), Det. 4: C-2A Greyhound
No. 4	USS Camden (AOE-2)	Strike Fighter Squadron 146 (VFA-146): FA-18C Hornet	—
No. 5	USS Olympia (SSN-717)	Electronic Attack Squadron 138 (VAQ-138): EA-6B Prowler	—
No. 6	EOD Mobile Unit 11, Detach. 9	Carrier Airborne Early Warning 112 (VAW-112): E-2C Hawkeye	—
Notes			

=== Joint Task Force Exercise 05-2 ===
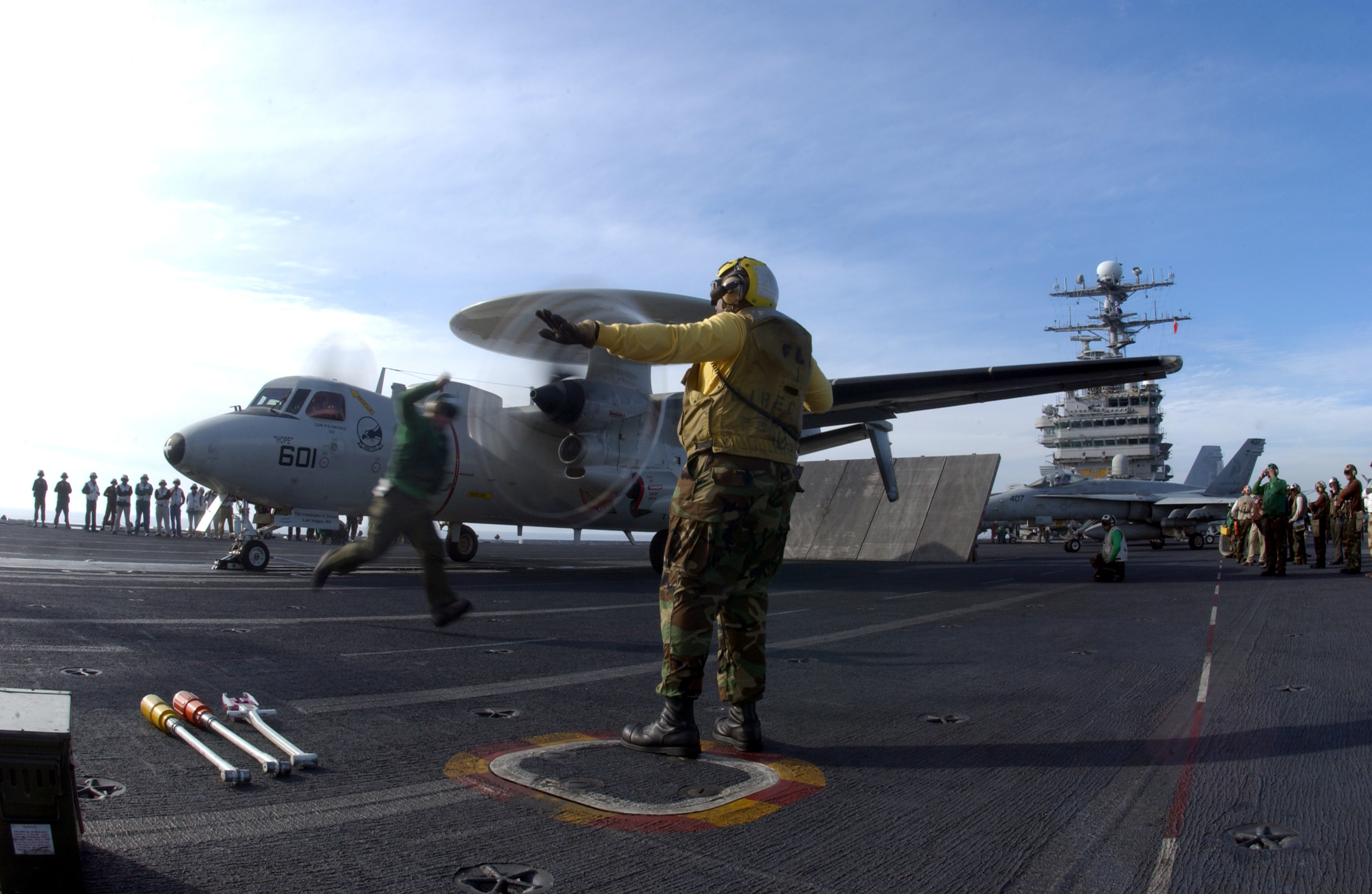
An aircraft director prepares an E-2C Hawkeye for launch during JTFEX 05-2

Carrier Strike Group Three participated in Joint Task Force Exercise 05-2 (JTFEX 05-2) off the coast of southern California. The exercise was the final step in preparing the strike group for deployment by testing its ability to operate in a complex, hostile environment with other U.S. and coalition forces, which included an anti-submarine warfare exercise (ASWEX), numerous simulated Tomahawk strike missions, an air defense exercise, and exercises with naval special warfare forces. Other participating military forces included Patrol Squadron 40 (VP-40); helicopter squadrons HSL-45 and HSL-49; and units from the Air Force Eighth Air Force. Admiral Clingan noted:

The Sailors and Marines of the Carl Vinson Strike Group have performed marvelously during the Joint Task Force Exercise. I couldn’t be more pleased with the way the strike group came together as a team and outperformed all expectations. This was a challenging exercise that required all of us to have our head in the game and think critically about how we fight. Everyone rose to that challenge and met it head on. There is no doubt our team is ready to answer our nation’s call during deployment.

With the 22-day exercise successfully completed on 30 January 2005, U.S. 3rd Fleet Commander Vice Adm. Michael McCabe certified that Carrier Strike Group Three was ready for its upcoming 2005 western Pacific (WESTPAC) deployment.

=== 2005 WESTPAC Deployment ===
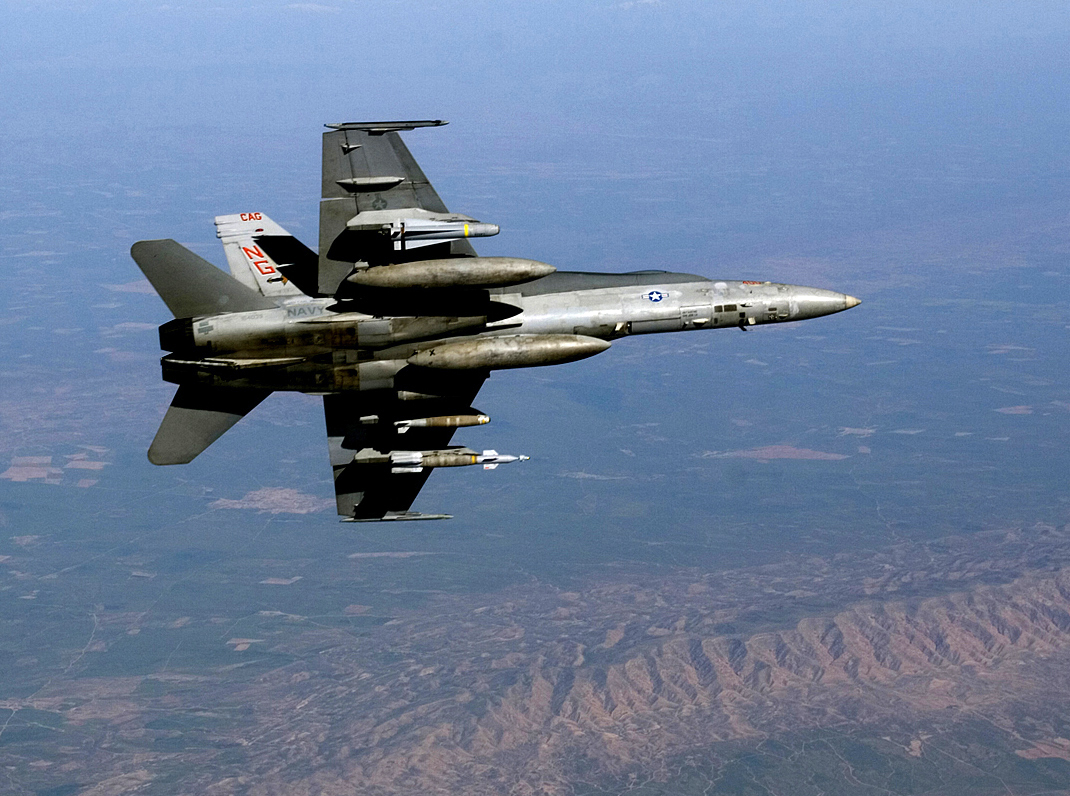
F/A-18C from VFA-147 over Iraq

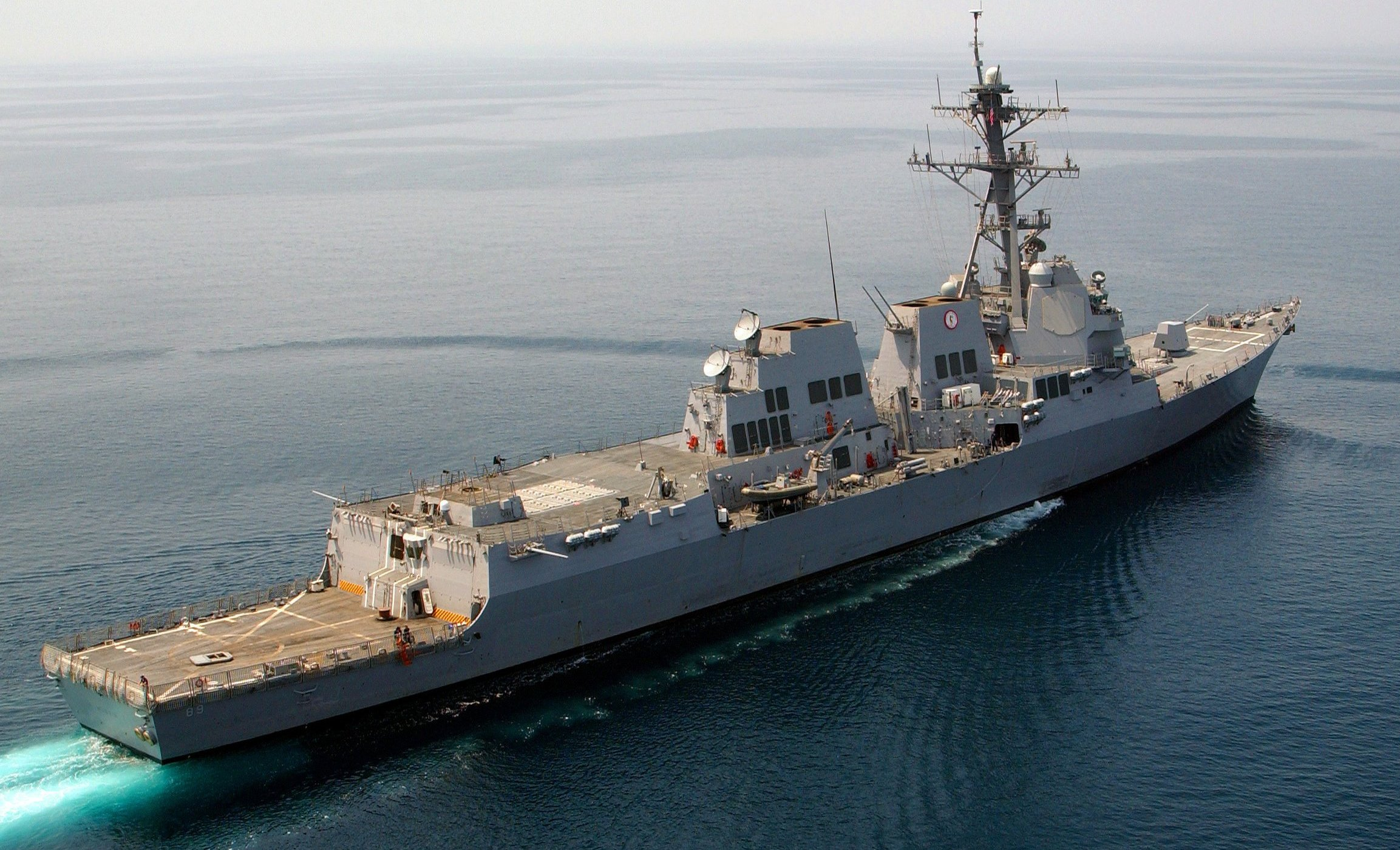
USS Mustin (DDG-89)

==== Carrier air operations ====
Carrier Strike Group Three relieved Carrier Strike Group Ten, led by the carrier USS Harry S. Truman (CVN-75), on 19 March 2005. On 8 May 2005, F/A-18C Hornet fighter jets dropped six precision bombs against anti-Iraqi forces south of Samarra, Iraq, while conducting presence and security missions in support of Iraqi and coalition ground forces. The aircraft came from CVW-9 squadrons VMFA-323 and VFA-147 (pictured). Also, a detachment from helicopter squadron HS-3 patrolled southeastern Iraq and the northern Persian Gulf to protect vital infrastructure, including Khawr Abd Allah and Khawr As Sabiyah, the waterways that separate Iraq from Iran and Kuwait. The detachment was temporarily based at Camp Arifjan, Kuwait.

In total, Carrier Strike Group Three launched more than 6,500 sorties, totaling more than 20,000 flight hours, in support of Operation Iraqi Freedom and maritime interdiction operations, including 2,600 flight hours logged by CVW-9's four F-18 squadrons. This overseas deployment marked the final overseas mission for Sea Control Squadron 33 (VS-33), the Screwbirds.

==== Maritime security operations ====
Overall, ships under the control of DESRON 31 conducted more than 80 boarding evolutions while working in cooperation with British, Italian, Australian, Canadian and regional forces. On 11 June 2005, DESRON-31 destroyer USS Mustin (DDG-89) (pictured) rendered at-sea medical assistance in response to a radio distress call from the Iranian-flagged fishing dhow Henif. A rigid hull inflatable boat (RHIB) transported an ill Iranian crew member to Mustin, where he was subsequently transported to Carl Vinson via an SH-60 helicopter. Once aboard Vinson, the Iranian fisherman was taken to the ship's medical facilities where he underwent a battery of tests. It was discovered that the fisherman was suffering from a severe allergic reaction. The Iranian national was treated, and after a short period of recovery, he was returned to the Henif via one of the carrier's RHIBs.

== CARSTRGRU-3 Flagship Changeover ==
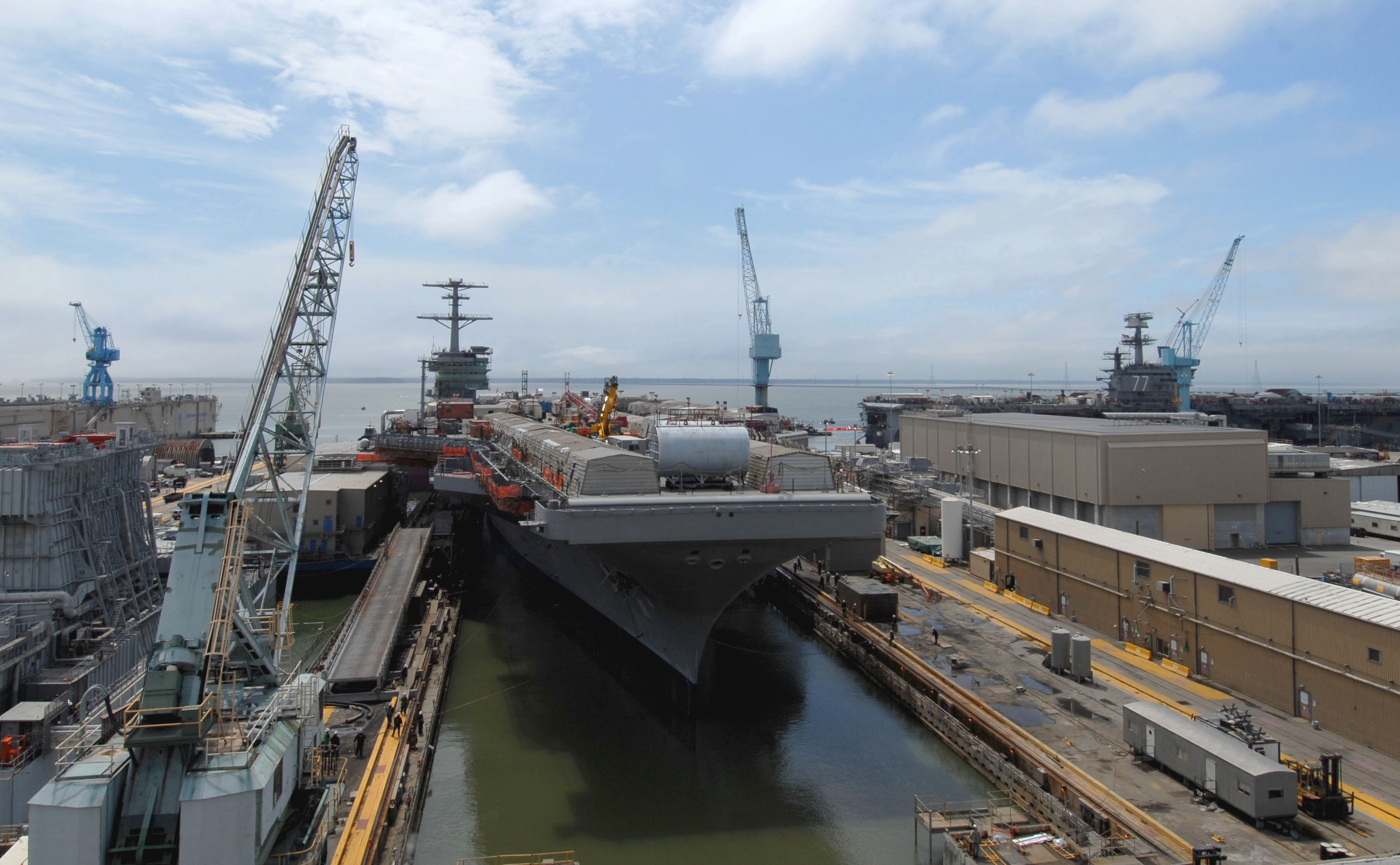
USS Vinson undergoing RCOH

Carrier Strike Group Three completed its 2005 deployment at Naval Station Norfolk on 31 July 2005, and the carrier Carl Vinson began its scheduled 36-month Refueling Complex Overhaul (RCOH) at the Northrop Grumman Newport News shipyard at Newport News, Virginia (pictured). The ship will spend nearly two-thirds of its RCOH in dry dock to accomplish planned repairs and install the latest technologies in computer software, combat systems, propulsion controls, and aviation support, including the installation of new propellers and a main master for its island superstructure. Following its RCOH, the Vinson became the flagship for Carrier Strike Group One.

The new Carrier Strike Group Three flagship, the aircraft carrier USS John C. Stennis (CVN-74), changed its homeport to Bremerton in January 2005, and once there, underwent an 11-month Docking Planned Incremental Availability (DPIA) 05/06 maintenance and yard overhail period, the first time she had been dry-docked since its 1995 commissioning.

Reflecting the reduced responsibilities while the ships were undergoing overhauls, Rear Admiral Clingan was succeeded by Captain Scott A. Berg in September 2005 as Commander Carrier Strike Group Three (COMCARSTKGRU 3). Rear Admiral Kevin M. Quinn subsequently relieved Captain Berg in November 2005.

== 2006 Operations ==
=== Pre-deployment training ===
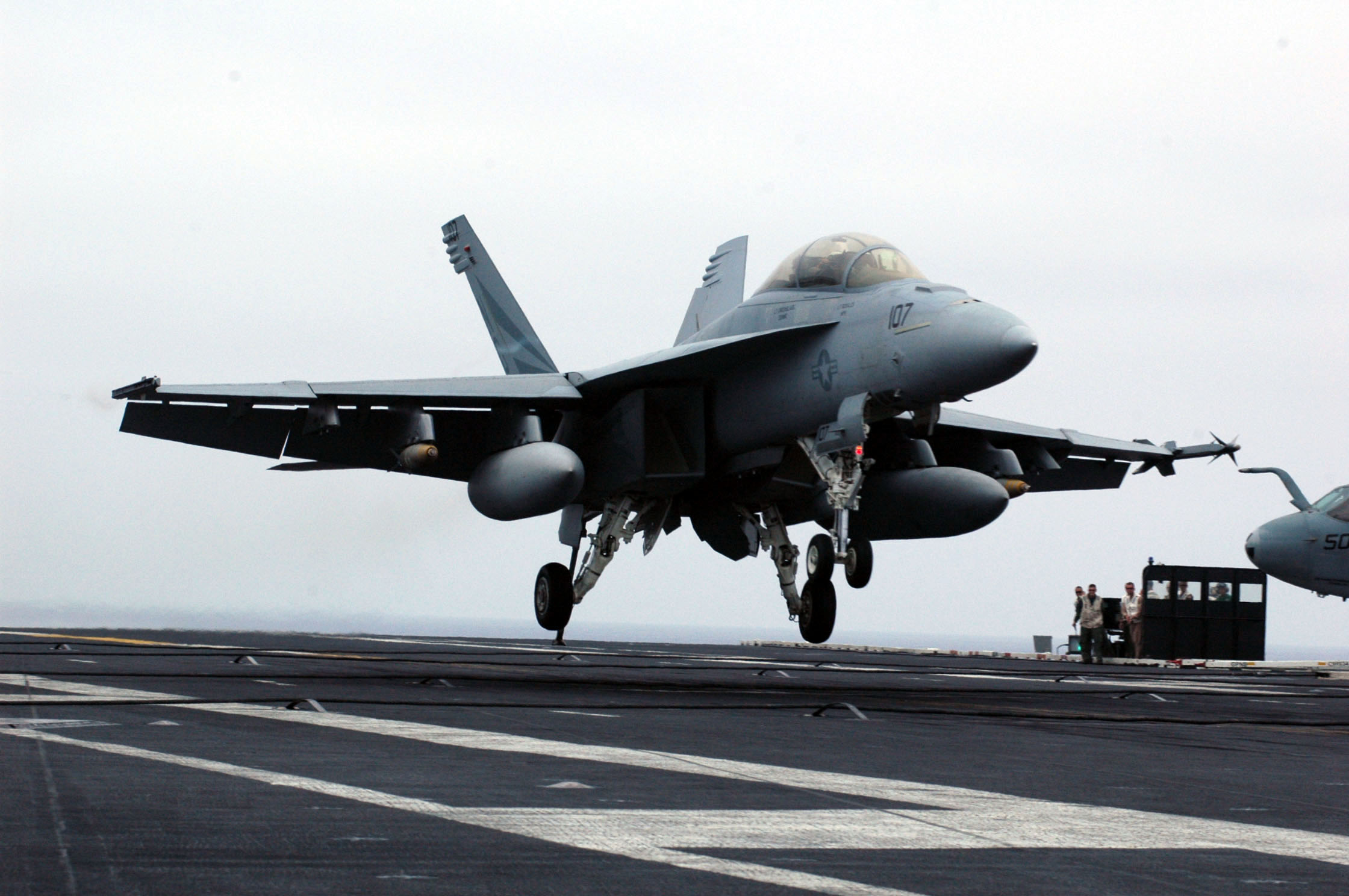
VFA-154 FA-18E Super Hornet

Stennis's post-DPIA sea trials occurred between 12 December–17, 2005, and the carrier completed its post-overhaul flight deck operation certification on 8 February 2006. Stennis also completed its carrier qualifications (CQ) for Carrier Air Wing Nine (CVW-9) pilots in April 2006, and the ship passed its Board of Inspection and Survey (INSURV) certification on 21 April 2006. The carrier and CVW-9 began conducting cyclic flight operations off the coast of Southern California on 21 June 2006, and Stennis successfully completed a subsequent seven-week underway period on 18 July 2006, being declared surge ready for any unscheduled overseas deployment.

The warships of the group began pre-deployment training during composite training unit exercises (COMPTUEX) on 21 September 2006. DESRON-21 guided missile destroyers USS Paul Hamilton (DDG-60), USS O'Kane (DDG-77), and USS Preble (DDG-88) joined the guided missile cruiser USS Antietam (CG-54) and the carrier Stennis in anti-submarine warfare (ASW) active/passive track training exercises. O'Kane practiced boarding and searching suspect vessels and fast attack craft/fast inshore attack craft countermeasure exercises. Paul Hamilton conducted visit, board, search and seizure (VBSS) team exercises as well Tomahawk land attack missile exercises (TLAMEX). Stennis and Carrier Air Wing Nine (CVW-9) completed surge flight operations certifications. Carrier Strike Group Three completed its COMPTUEX exercises on 12 October 2006.

=== Joint Task Force Exercise ===
Carrier Strike Group Three (CARSTKGRU 3) departed Naval Air Station North Island to conduct its Joint Task Force Exercise (JTFEX) off the coast of Southern California on 8 November 2006. It consisted of the carrier Stennis, Carrier Wing Nine; the guided missile cruiser Antietam, the guided missile destroyers O'Kane, Paul Hamilton, and Preble; the nuclear attack submarine Chicago;and the fast combat support ship Bridge. For this exercise, CARSTRKGRU 3 operated with Carrier Strike Group Seven which consists of the carrier Ronald Reagan; the guided missile cruiser Lake Champlain, and the guided missile destroyers Momsen and Russell. The two carrier strike groups rendezvoused off the coast of Southern California to form Carrier Task Force 150 (CTF-150), which operated between 12 November–16, 2006, under the overall command of Rear Admiral Kevin M. Quinn, the commander of Carrier Strike Group Three. The group returned to Naval Base Kitsap, Bremerton, Washington, on 21 November 2006 after completing the exercise.

== 2007 Operations ==
=== 2007 WESTPAC Deployment ===
Stennis departed from its homeport in Bremerton, Washington, on 16 January 2007, spent one day in port on-loading the air wing onto the carrier, and departed San Diego on 20 January 2007. The carrier strike group commander, Rear Admiral Kevin M. Quinn, outlined the objectives of the deployment:

We will support Operation Iraqi Freedom, Enduring Freedom, the Horn of Africa and maritime security operations with the purpose to provide regional and global stability. We’ve been preparing for this deployment for more than one year, we have trained and trained so that we are completely combat ready.

The strike group returned to San Diego on 27 August 2007, and the carrier John C. Stennis returned to its homeport on 31 August 2007.

==== Force composition ====
Units	CARSTRKGRU 3 Warships/Units	Carrier Air Wing Nine (CVW-9) squadrons embarked aboard flagship USS John C. Stennis (CVN-74)	
No. 1	USS Antietam (CG-54)	Marine Attack Fighter Squadron 323 (VMFA-323): FA-18C(N) Hornet	Sea Control Squadron 31 (VS-31): 8 S-3B Viking
No. 2	USS Preble (DDG-88)	Strike Fighter Squadron 154 (VFA-154): 12 FA-18F Super Hornet	Helicopter Squadron 8 (HS-8): 2 HH-60H Seahawk & 4 SH-60F Seahawk
No. 3	USS O'Kane (DDG-77)	Strike Fighter Squadron 147 (VFA-147): 12 FA-18C(N) Hornet	Fleet Logistics Support Squadron 40 (VRC-40), Det. 4: 4 C-2A Greyhound
No. 4	USS Paul Hamilton (DDG-60)	Strike Fighter Squadron 143 (VF-143): 12 FA-18C Hornet	—
No. 5	USNS Bridge (T-AOE-10)	Electronic Attack Squadron 138 (VAQ-138): 4 EA-6B Prowler	—
No. 6	EOD Unit 11, Det. 11	Carrier Airborne Early Warning 112 (VAW-112): 4 E-2C Hawkeye NP	—
Notes			

==== Seventh Fleet operations ====
Carrier Strike Group Three (CARSTRGRU-3) entered the U.S. Seventh Fleet area of responsibility (AOR) on 31 January 2007. and the Guam Operating area (GOA) on 4 February 2007, where CARSTRGRU-3 conducted integrated strike group (ISG) training exercises between 6 February–8, 2007. This training included maritime interdiction operations (MIO); visit, board, search and seizure (VBSS); combat-simulated flight operations; and various live-fire surface exercises.

==== Fifth Fleet operations ====
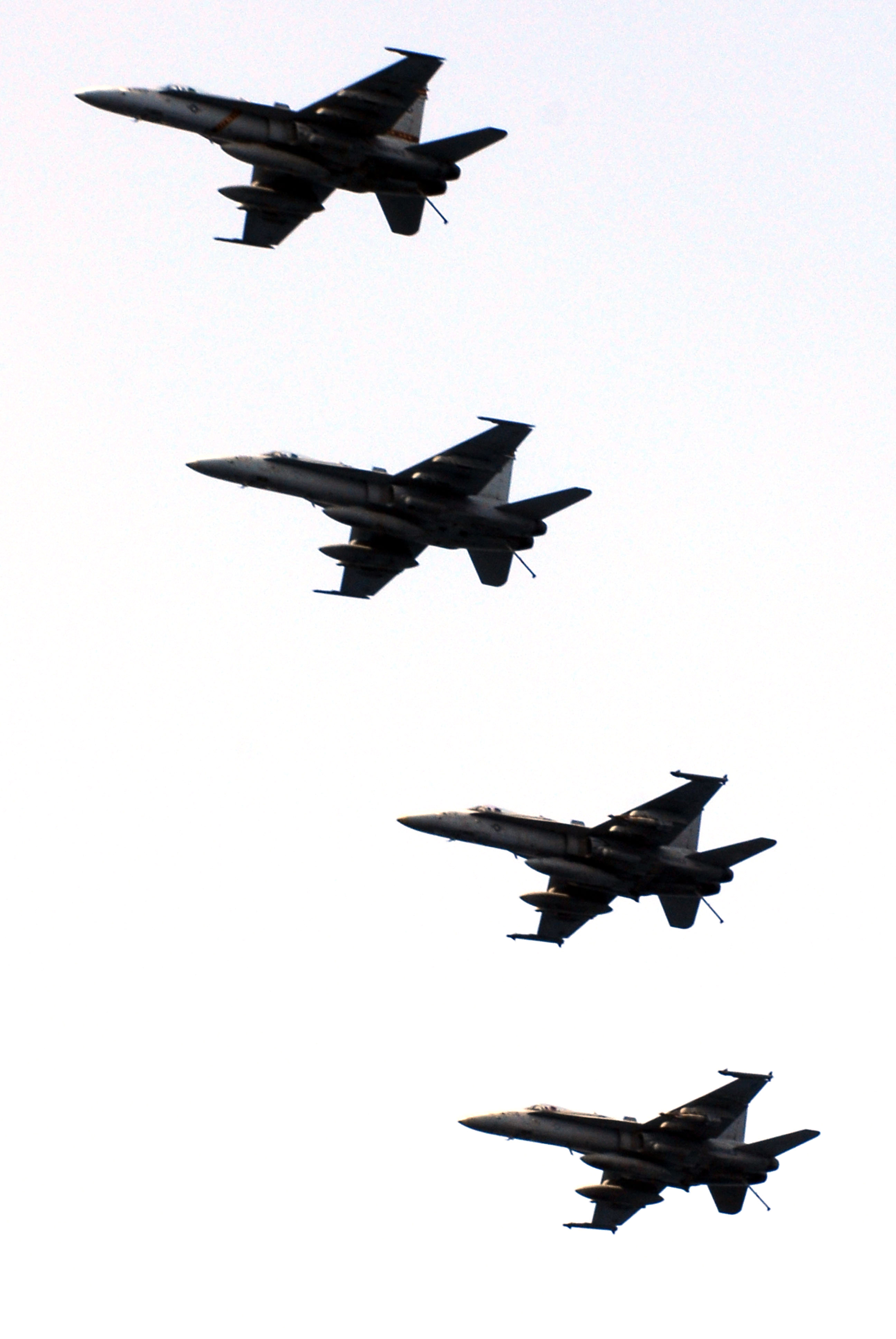
VFA-154 F/A-18F Super Hornets over Persian Gulf (28 March 2007)

Carrier Strike Group Three arrived in the Northern Arabian Sea on 19 February 2007, and the group began providing combat air support for ground forces operating in Afghanistan as well as conducting Maritime Security Operations (MSO) in regional waters.

===== Carrier air operations =====
The strike group joined the French carrier task group led by the nuclear carrier Charles De Gaulle. Both carrier groups operated together through 16 April 2007. The group spent five months deployed to the U.S. Fifth Fleet area of responsibility. Carrier Air Wing 9 flew more than 7,900 sorties providing more than 22,000 flight hours and dropping nearly 90,000 pounds of ordnance in support of the International Security Assistance Force operating on the ground in Afghanistan and Iraq. Admiral Quinn commended the efforts of Carrier Air Wing 9:

Reports from ground forces in combat say our aircraft are providing the support they need and are making a real difference in the fight against the Taliban. Not only are we helping our troops on the ground and saving lives, but we're helping the Afghan people.

During the 2007 WESTPAC deployment, Airborne Early Warning Squadron 112 (VAW-112) celebrated its 40th anniversary on 18 April 2007. Also, VFA-154 completed its first deployment with the FA-18F Super Hornet (pictured). Also, on 15 June 2007, the flight deck of USS John C. Stennis recorded its 100,000th arrested landing with the trap of an F/A-18F Super Hornet from the Strike Fighter Squadron 154 (VFA-154) flown by Commander Clark Troyer and Lt. John Young following a close-air-support mission over Afghanistan in support of Operation Enduring Freedom. Finally, Commander Muhammad Muzzafar F. Khan, the commanding officer of Sea Control Squadron 32 (VS-32), completed his 1,000th carrier arrested landing aboard USS John C. Stennis (CVN-74) on 4 August 2007 while transiting the Western Pacific Ocean en route to participate in Exercise Valiant Shield 2007.

The carrier strike group commander, Rear Admiral Kevin M. Quinn, noted the accomplishments of the 2007 deployment to the Fifth Fleet are of responsibility (AOR):

Our air wing set records for combat support for troops in Afghanistan. Their precision bombing in support of troops on the ground helped achieve our national objectives in the area, and more importantly, they helped save the lives of our troops who were in direct contact with the enemy.

===== Maritime security operations =====
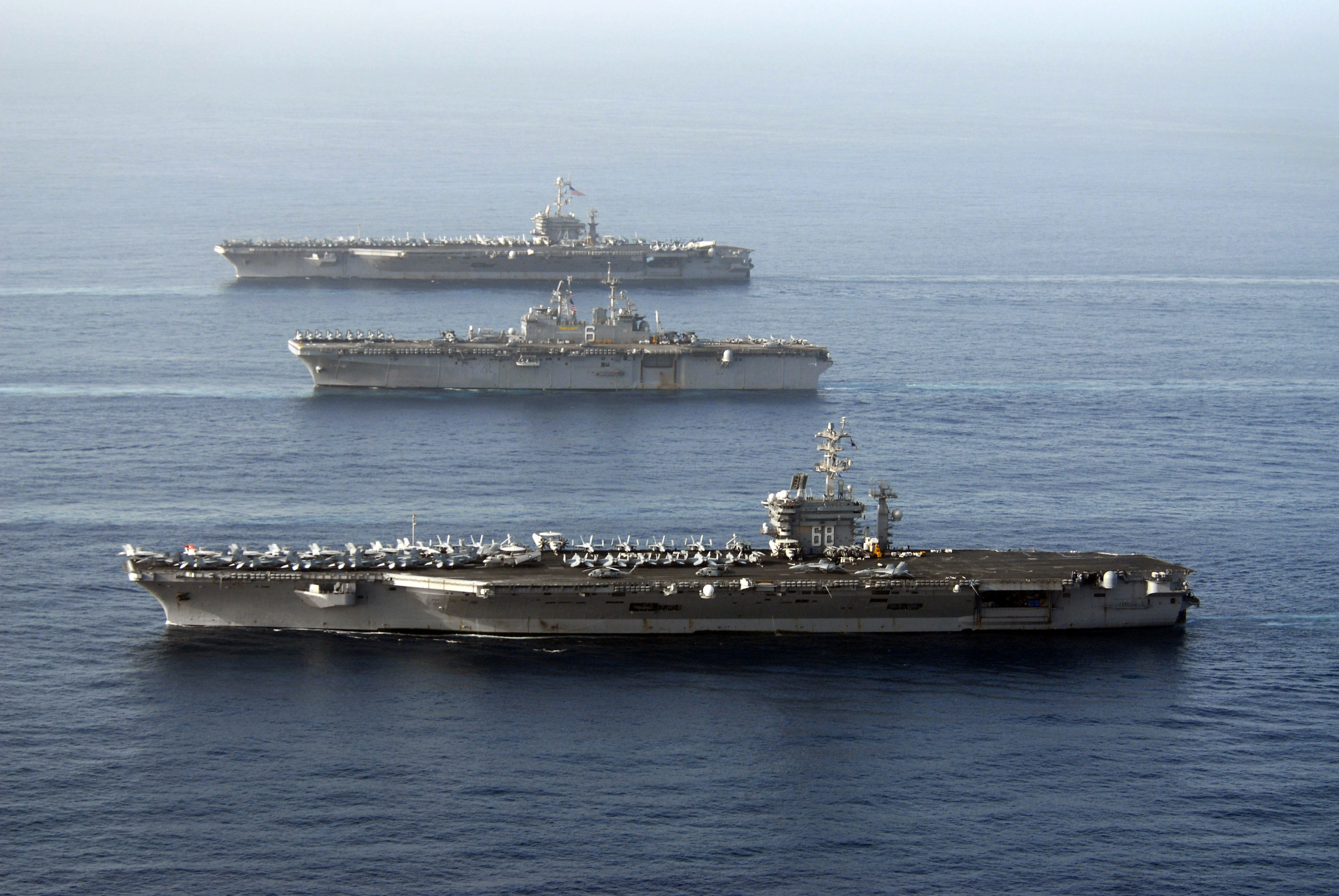
John C. Stennis, Bonhomme Richard, and Nimtz in Gulf of Oman (22 May 2007)

DESRON-21 guided-missile destroyers O'Kane and Preble were primarily responsible for carrying out MSO, Maritime Interdiction Operations, and Visit, Board, Search and Seizure operations for the group during its 2007 MED deployment. DESRON-21 commodore Captain Michael Salvato noted:

Conducting [maritime operations] in the Persian Gulf send a signal of security and stability to the region. We're all working to achieve the same objective; ensuring the free flow of commerce across the seas. Coalition ships working together are able to respond to any threat that might interfere with the stability of that objective.

===== Expeditionary strike force operations =====
On 23 May 2007, the carrier Stennis, along with eight other warships including the aircraft carrier Nimitz and amphibious assault ship Bonhomme Richard, passed through the Strait of Hormuz into the Persian Gulf (pictured). US Navy officials said it was the largest such move of warships since 2003. CARSTRKGRU 3 subsequently participated in Expeditionary Strike Force (ESF) training in the Fifth Fleet AOR while simultaneously providing close-air support to coalition ground forces in Iraq and Afghanistan. The ESF training brought together CARSTRKGRU 3, the Nimitz Carrier Strike Group, and Bonhomme Richard Expeditionary Strike Group to test their ability to plan and conduct multi-task force operations across a broad spectrum of naval disciplines.

==== Valiant Shield 2007 ====
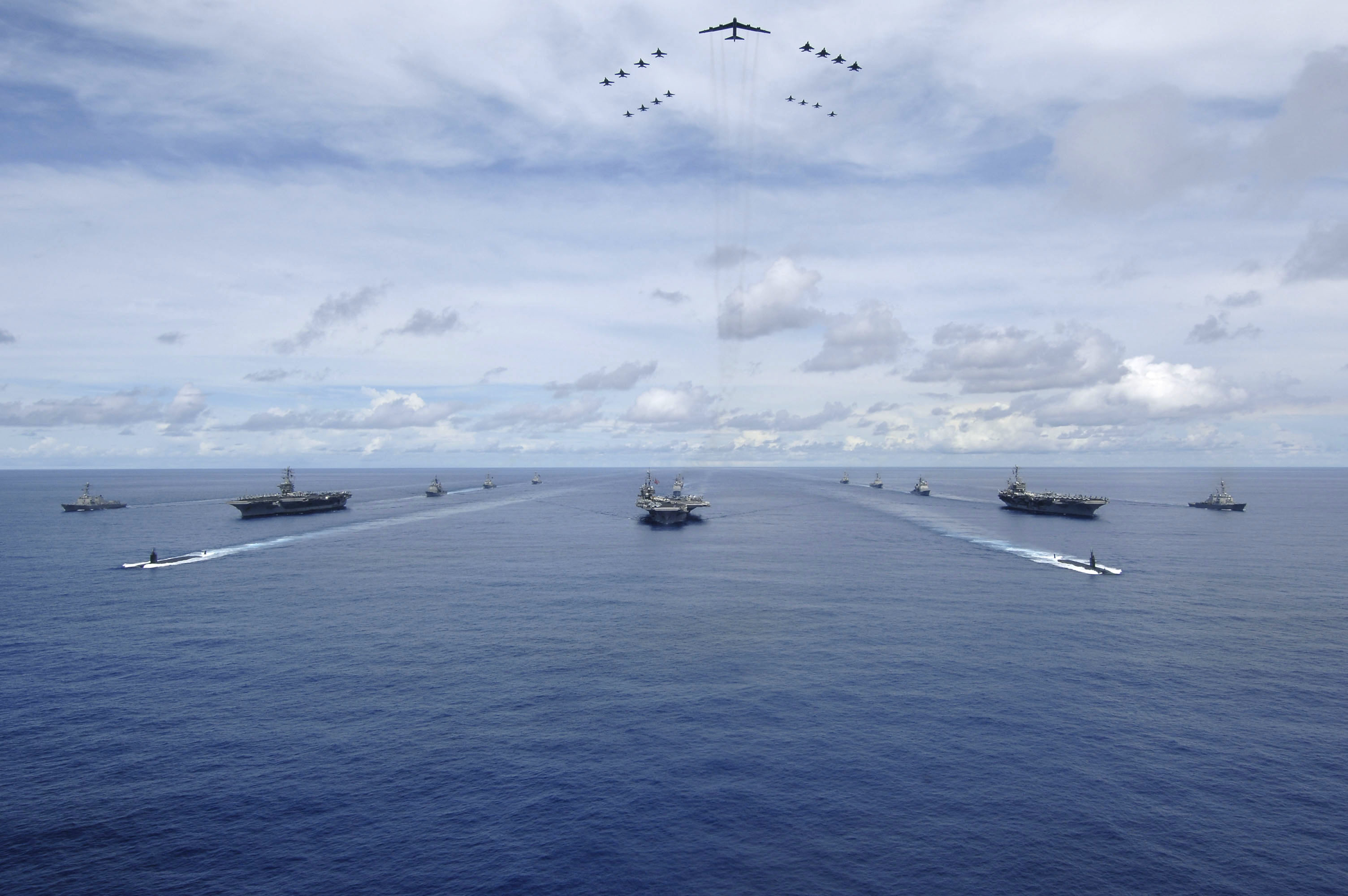
Valiant Shield 2007

Carrier Strike Group Three (CARSTRKGRU 3) participated in Exercise Valiant Shield 2007 off the coast of Guam between 7 August–14, 2007. The joint military exercise brought together more than 30 ships, including carrier strike groups led by the Kitty Hawk and Nimitz; 280 aircraft; and more than 20,000 service members from the U.S. Navy, U.S. Air Force, U.S. Marine Corps, and U.S. Coast Guard. Valiant Shield 2007 tested the military's ability to rapidly bring together joint forces in response to any regional contingency while demonstrating the United States' commitment to ensuring peace and stability throughout the Asia-Pacific region. CARSTRKGRU 3 commander, Rear Admiral Kevin M. Quinn, noted:

All the strike groups in Valiant Shield performed extremely well. What we found in Valiant Shield is that we can come together at sea, working in a joint military environment, having not worked with each other a lot before and fall into a strike force construct to conduct integrated combat operations.

Valiant Shield was the last operational portion of the group's 2007 deployment. The strike group sailed to the U.S. Third Fleet area of responsibility (AOR) and into Pearl Harbor on 20 August 2007.

==== Exercises and port visits ====
Number	Regional exercises				Port visits		Notes
Number	Duration	US force	Bilateral or multilateral partners	Operating area	Location	Dates	Notes
1st:	—	Carrier Strike Group Three	—	—	Singapore	19–23 July 2007	
2nd:	—	Carrier Strike Group Three	—	—	Hong Kong	28 July – 1 August 2007	
3rd:	7–14 August 2007	Carrier Strike Group Three	Valiant Shield 2007	Guam operating area (GOA)	Pearl Harbor	20 August. 2007	

=== Change of command ===
On 2 September 2007, Rear Admiral M. Stewart O'Bryan assumed command of Carrier Strike Group Three, relieving Rear Admiral Kevin M. Quinn. Admiral Quinn's next assignment was as Commander, Naval Surface Force Atlantic. A surface warfare officer (SWO), Admiral O'Bryan commanded the destroyer Cole and Task Group 55.6 in the Red Sea during Operation Iraqi Freedom, and prior to taking command of Carrier Strike Group Three, he served as the chief of staff of the U.S. Sixth Fleet.

=== USS John C. Stennis maintenance cycle ===
On 28 September 2007, the carrier Stennis began a six-month scheduled docking-planned incremental availability (DPIA) maintenance and yard overhaul period when the ship was shifted from its homeport pier at Naval Base Kitsap to a drydock at the Puget Sound Naval Shipyard and Intermediate Maintenance Facility (PSNS & IMF) in Bremerton, Washington.

== 2008 operations ==
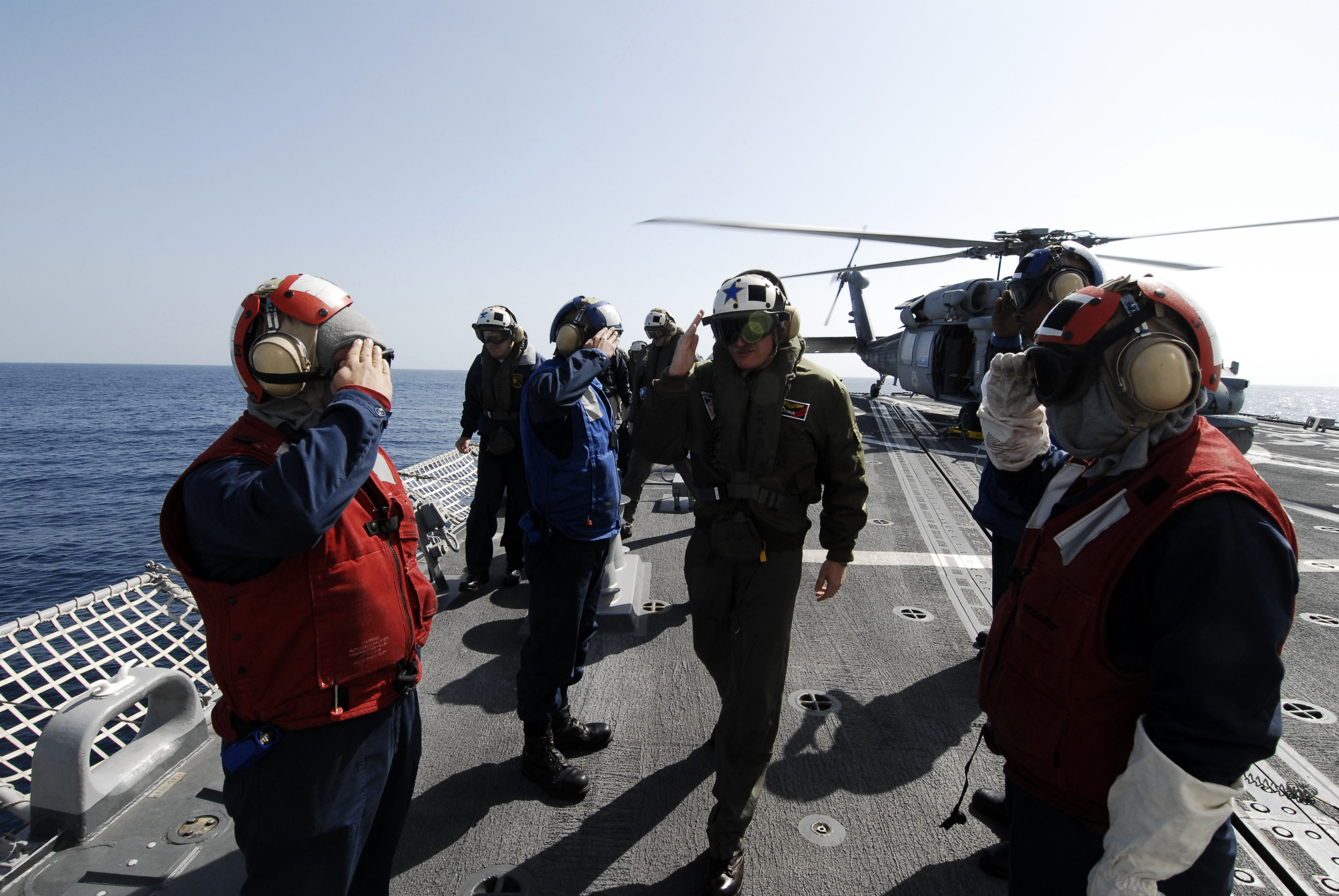
Rear Admiral Mark A. Vance on board USS Kidd (DDG-100)

=== Pre-deployment training ===
The carrier Stennis was underway for its post-refit sea trials between 24 March–28, 2008. The Stennis and Carrier Air Wing Nine (CVW-9) completed a two-month underway period on 30 June 2008, which included their Tailored Ship's Training Availability (TSTA) and the Final Evaluation Problem (FEP) training exercises. The group successfully completed a Composite Unit Training Exercise (COMPTUEX) off the coast of southern California on 5 November 2008. CARSTRKGRU 3 successfully completed its Joint Task Force Exercise (JTFEX) off the coast of Southern California on 16 November 2008.

=== Change of command ===
Rear Admiral Mark A. Vance (pictured) relieved Rear Admiral M. Stewart O'Bryan as the Commander Carrier Strike Group Three (COMCARSTKGRU 3) on 12 September 2008. Admiral O'Bryan's next assignment was as the director of Global Maritime Situational Awareness within the office of Chief of Naval Operations. A naval aviator, Admiral Vance commanded Carrier Air Wing Three during Operation Iraqi Freedom, and prior to becoming COMCARSTKGRU 3, he served as the served as associate director, Assessment Division (N81D) within the office of the Chief of Naval Operations.

== 2009 operations ==
=== 2009 WESTPAC deployment ===
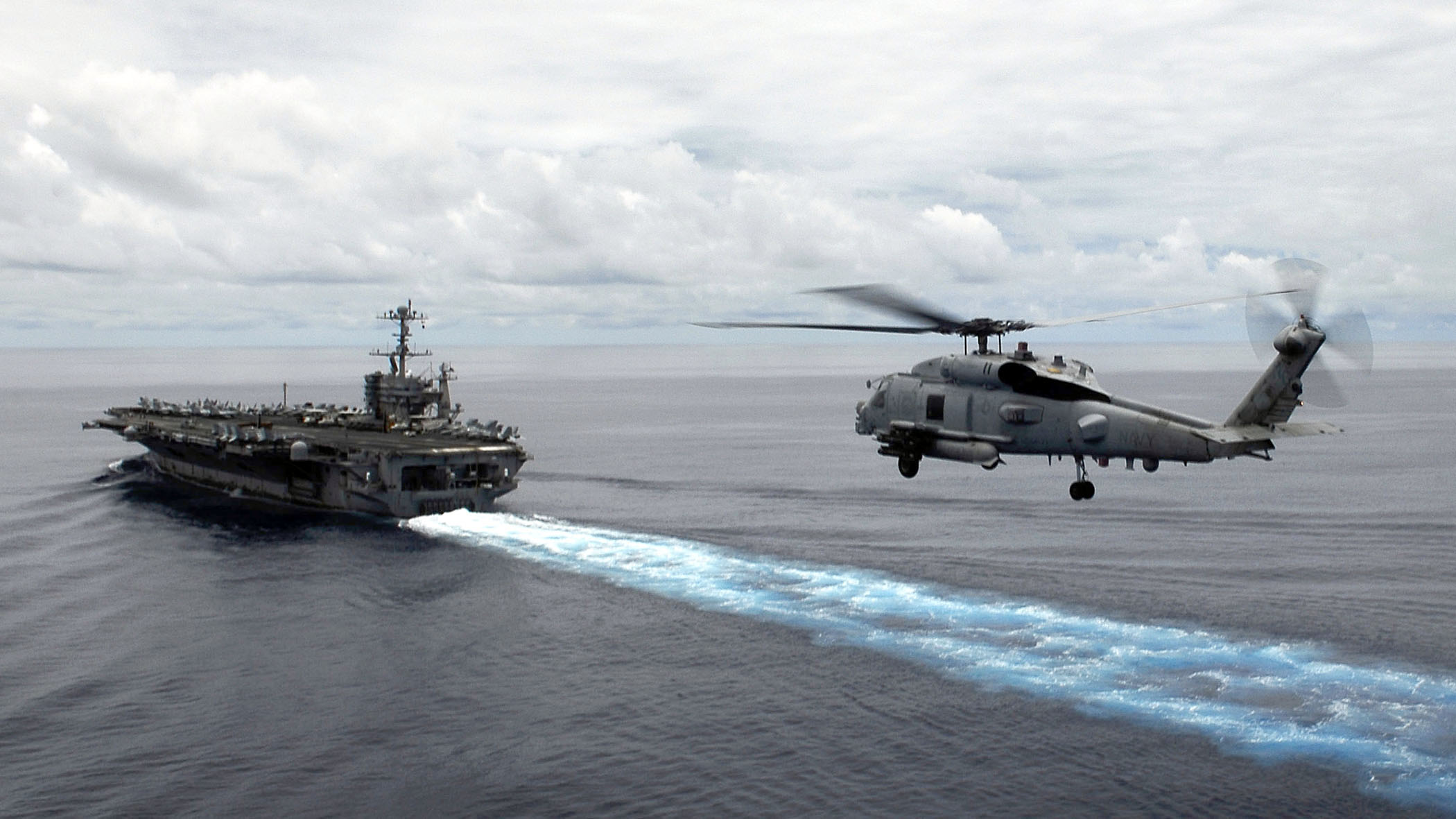
MH-60R Sea Hawk from HSM-71

The nuclear-powered aircraft carrier USS John C. Stennis (CVN-74) depart its homeport of Bremerton, Washington, on 13 January 2009, and departed Naval Air Station North Island on 17 January 2009 after embarking Carrier Air Wing Nine (CVW-9).

Carrier Air Wing Nine (CVW-9) flew more than 7250 sorties, consisting of approximately 12,747 flight hours with a sortie completion rate of 97 percent during it 2009 WESTPAC deployment. Also, Helicopter Maritime Strike Squadron 71 (HSM-71), a new component to Carrier Air Wing Nine (CVW-9), is the first squadron of its kind to embark on board a carrier as part of a carrier air wing (pictured). The squadron flew more than 4,690 hours with a 95 percent sortie completion rate and earned the right to fly the Enlisted Aviation Warfare Pennant. The highlight for the squadron occurred during the undersea warfare exercise (USWEX) when HSM-71 deployed multiple aircraft to simulate engagements with U.S. and Japanese submarines. The squadron kept three helicopters aloft throughout the entire four-day exercise for a total of 222 flight hours and conducted 28 simulated attacks on two U.S. and two Japanese submarines.

Carrier Strike Group Three completed its 2009 deployment after six months at sea, returning to Bremerton, Washington, on 10 July 2009.

==== Force composition ====
Units	CARSTRKGRU 3 Warships	Carrier Air Wing Nine (CVW-9) squadrons embarked aboard flagship USS John C. Stennis (CVN-74)	
No. 1	USS Antietam (CG-54)	Marine Attack Fighter Squadron 323 (VMFA-323): 10 FA-18C(N) Hornet	Electronic Attack Squadron 138 (VAQ-138): 4 EA-6B Prowler
No. 2	USS Kidd (DDG-100)	Strike Fighter Squadron 146 (VFA-146): 10 FA-18C Hornet	Carrier Airborne Early Warning 112 (VAW-112): 4 E-2C Hawkeye NP
No. 3	USS Preble (DDG-88)	Strike Fighter Squadron 154 (VFA-154): 12 FA-18F Super Hornet	Helicopter Maritime Strike Squadron 71 (HSM-71): 2 MH-60S Seahawk
No. 4	—	Strike Fighter Squadron 147 (VFA-147): 12 FA-18F Super Hornet	Helicopter Sea Control Squadron 8 (HSC-8): 4 MH-60R Seahawk
No. 5	—		Fleet Logistics Support Squadron 40 (VRC-40), Det. 4: 4 C-2A Greyhound
Notes			

Carrier Strike Group Three paid a scheduled port visit to Laem Chabang, Thailand, between 9 April–13, 2009.

==== Key Resolve/Foal Eagle 2009 ====
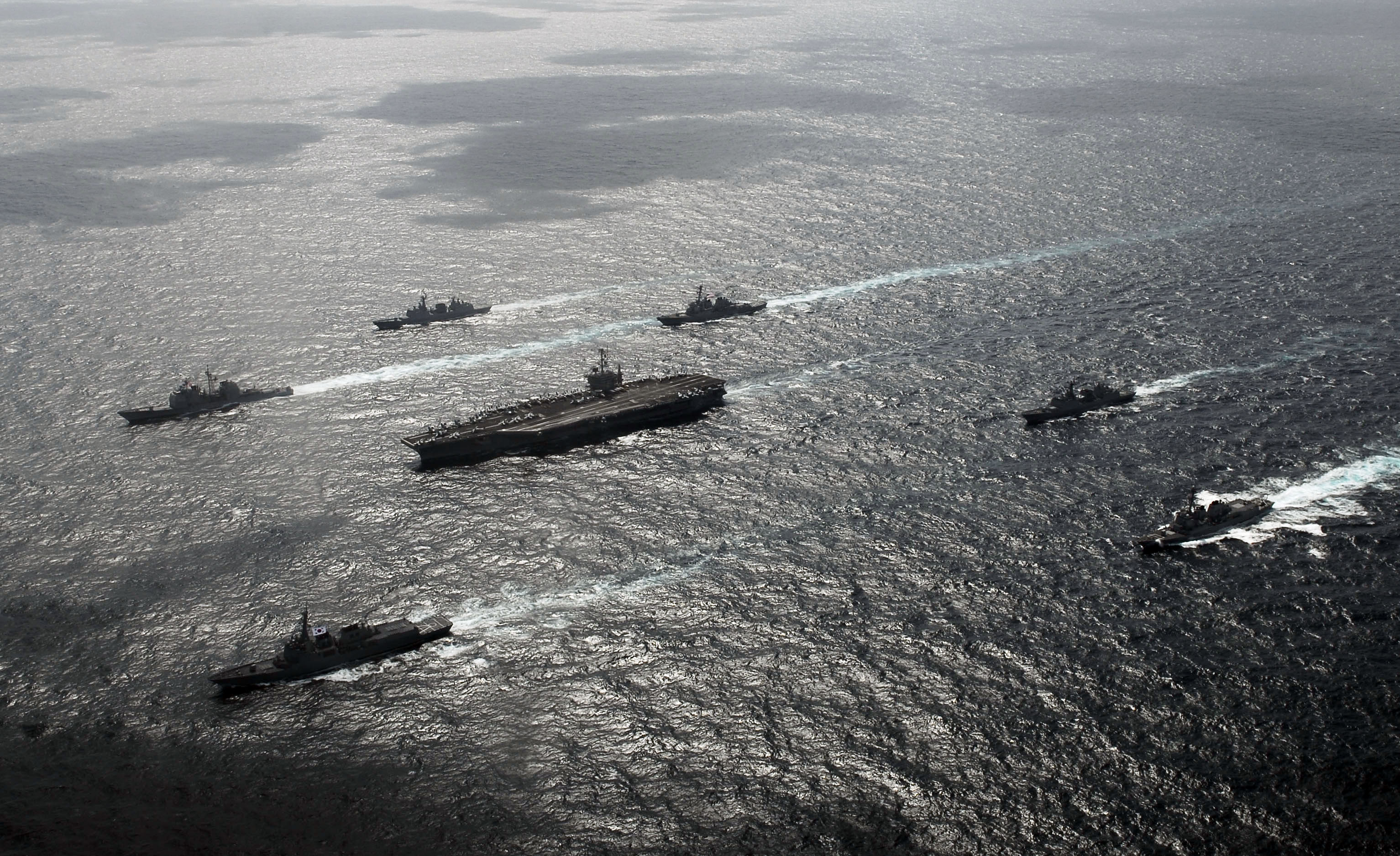
Key Resolve/Foal Eagle 2009

Carrier Strike Group Three participated in the Key Resolve/Foal Eagle 2009 (KR/FE 09) exercises (pictured) which began on 28 February 2009. Key Resolve/Foal Eagle was held in the aftermath of the sinking of the ROK corvette Cheonan and the shelling of Yeonpyeong Island by North Korea.

This annual combined Field Training Exercise (FTX) was conducted between the Republic of Korea (ROK) and United States armed forces under the auspices of Combined Forces Command (CFC) within the Korean Theater of Operations (KTO). Approximately 12,800 U.S. and 200,000 South Korean troops participated in the exercise. Key Resolve was the computer-based simulation portion of the combined exercise, while Foal Eagle was the peninsula-wide training portion of the exercise. Key Resolve is scheduled to end 10 March, and Foal Eagle on 30 April.

During the exercise, the aircraft carrier John C. Stennis was overflown by two Russian Ilyushin Il-38 maritime patrol aircraft on 16 March and two Tupolev Tu-95 long-range bombers on 17 March. In both incidents, the intruders were intercepted and escorted by F/A-18 Hornets until the Russian aircraft left the exercise area.

==== Northern Edge 2009 ====
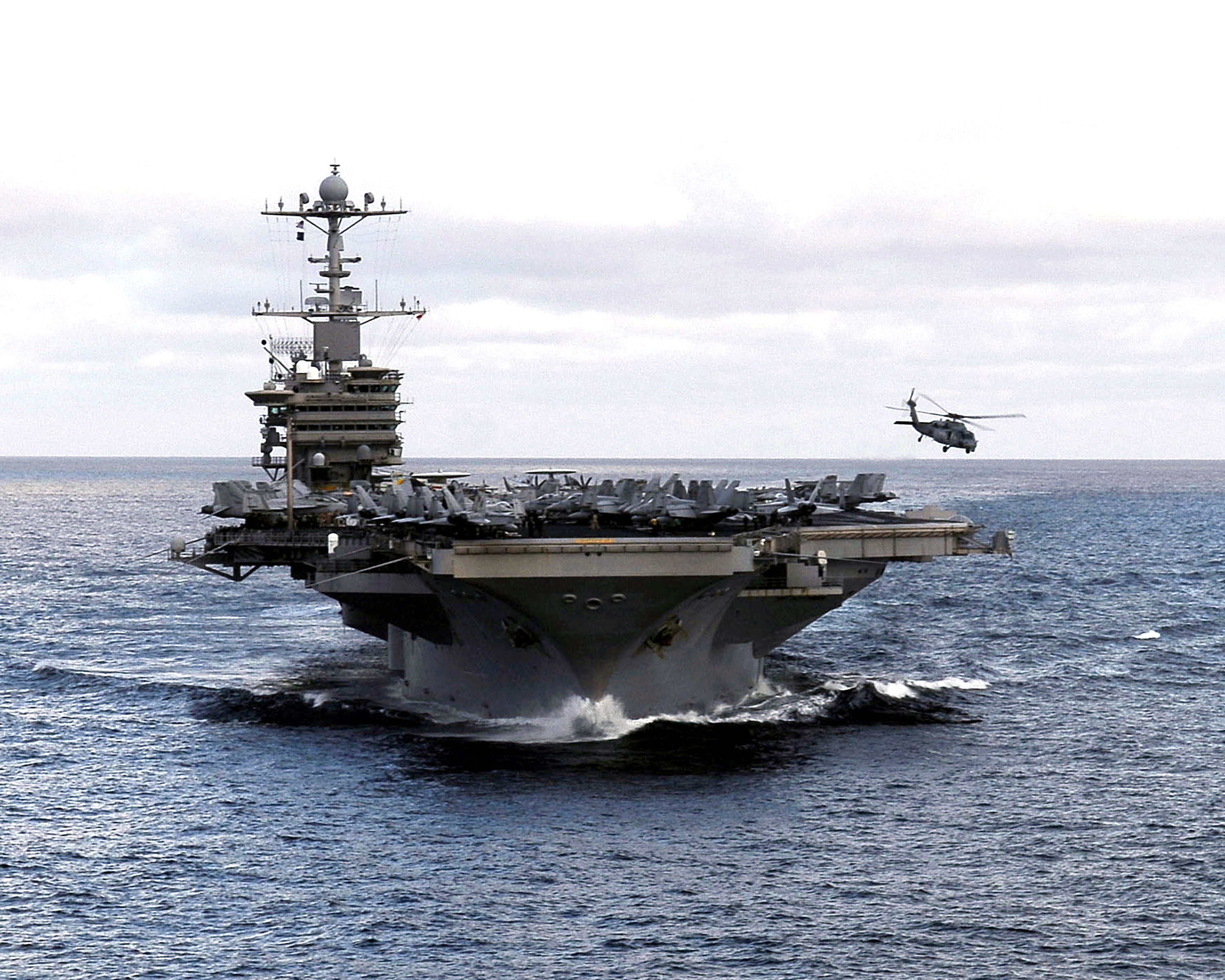
Northern Edge 2009

Carrier Strike Group Three participated in Operation Northern Edge (pictured) held between 15–26 June 2009. Strike group units consisted of carrier John C. Stennis (pictured), Carrier Air Wing Nine (CVW-9) and the guided-missile cruiser Antietam.

Northern Edge was joint exercise provided real-world proficiency in detection and tracking of units at sea, in the air and on land and response to multiple crises, with approximately 9,000 U.S. active-duty and reserve-component military personnel participating. It was designed to be an air-centric exercise to train units in joint air operations tactics and command and control in a cost-effective and low-risk environment, with more than 200 aircraft from every branch of the U.S. military involved. Lt. General Dana T. Atkins, USAF, the commanding general of Alaskan Command and Eleventh Air Force, noted:

Northern Edge is the premier exercise conducted within the Pacific Command's area of responsibility. It lets our joint warfighters learn about each other.

Northern Edge operations was conducted within the Joint Pacific Alaska Range Complex, which includes more than 60,000 square miles (155,399.29 square kilometers) of air space, and the Gulf of Alaska, which encompasses 50,000 square miles (129,499.40 square kilometers) of air space.

On 22 June 2009, during the Northern Edge exercise, Governor of Alaska Sarah Palin visited the Stennis.

==== Exercises and port visits ====
Number	Regional exercises				Port visits		Notes
Number	Duration	U.S. Force	Bilateral/Multilateral Partner(s)	Operating Area	Location	Dates	Notes
1st:	10 February.	Carrier Strike Group Three	USWEX: Japan Maritime Self-Defense Force	Western Pacific	Hong Kong	17 February.	
2nd:	—	Carrier Strike Group Three	—	—	Sasebo, Japan	27 February.	
3rd:	28 February. – 30 April.	Carrier Strike Group Three	Key Resolve/Foal Eagle: Republic of Korea Armed Forces	Korean Theater of Operations	Busan, RKO	11 March.	
4th:	—	Carrier Strike Group Three	—	—	Laem Chabang, Thailand	9–13 April.	
5th:	—	Carrier Strike Group Three	—	—	Singapore	24 April.	
6th:	15–26 June.	Carrier Strike Group Three	Northern Edge: Alaskan Command	Gulf of Alaska	Pearl Harbor	27 May – 10 June.	

=== Change of command ===
On 25 September 2009, Rear Admiral Joseph P. Aucoin relieved Rear Admiral Mark A. Vance as Commander, Carrier Strike Group Three (COMCARSTKGRU 3). Admiral Vance's next assignment was as Director, Programming Division (N80), office of the Chief of Naval Operations. A naval aviator, Admiral Aucoin had commanded Carrier Air Wing Five, and prior to becoming COMCARSTKGRU 3, he served as the deputy director, Air Warfare (N88B) within the office of the Chief of Naval Operations.

=== Sustainment training exercises ===
Carrier Strike Group Three (COMSTRGRU 3) departed San Diego to begin a two-week sustainment exercise (SUSTAINEX) on 6 November 2009, operating for the first time since the end of its last Western Pacific (WESTPAC) deployment. The strike group consisted of the carrier John C. Stennis; Carrier Air Wing Nine; the guided-missile cruiser Antietam: and the guided-missile destroyers Kidd and Milius. SUSTAINEX training maintained the strike group's operational proficiencies in order that the strike group can meet the U.S. Navy's need for available carrier presence in accordance with its Fleet Response Plan (FRP).

== Sources ==
- Buss, Captain David H. (14 February 2005). 2004 Command History: USS John C. Stennis CVN-74 (PDF) (Report). Washington Navy Yard: Naval History & Heritage Command. Archived from the original (PDF) on 28 June 2011.
- Christensen, Nathan (July 2007). "Securing the Gulf" (PDF). All Hands. Washington, DC: U.S. Navy: 31–35. Archived from the original (PDF) on 11 July 2007.
- Morison, Samuel Loring (May 2008). "U.S. Naval Battle Force Changes 1 January 2007 – 31 December 2007: Aircraft Carrier Airwing Assignments and Composition as of 31 December 2007". Naval Institute Proceedings. 134 (5): 96–106. ISSN 0041-798X. "(Subscription required.)"
