= VA-146 =

VA-146 may refer to:

- Attack Squadron 146 (U.S. Navy)
- State Route 146 (Virginia)
