= Carrier Air Wing Nine =

Carrier Air Wing Nine (CVW-9)
- Active: 26 March 1952 – present
- Country: United States
- Branch: United States Navy
- Type: Carrier Air Wing
- Part of: United States Pacific Fleet
- Garrison/HQ: NAS Lemoore; USS Abraham Lincoln
- Nickname: Shogun
- Mottos: "Agile, Disciplined, Lethal"
- Tail Code: NG
- Engagements: Korean War; Vietnam War; Operation Formation Star; Operation Desert Storm; Operation Southern Watch; Operation Enduring Freedom; Operation Iraqi Freedom; Operation New Dawn; Operation Freedom's Sentinel; Operation Resolute Support; Operation Inherent Resolve; Operation Prosperity Guardian; Operation Poseidon Archer; Operation Epic Fury

Commanders
- Commander: CAPT Gerry "Dutch" Tritz
- Deputy Commander: CAPT William Frank
- Command Master Chief: CMDCM. Michael Westgate

Carrier Air Wing Nine (CVW-9) is a United States Navy aircraft carrier air wing based at Naval Air Station Lemoore. The Air Wing is currently assigned to the aircraft carrier USS Abraham Lincoln (CVN-72). The Tail Code of aircraft assigned to CVW-9 is NG.

== Mission ==
To conduct carrier air warfare operations and assist in the planning, control, coordination and integration of seven air wing squadrons in support of carrier air warfare including; interception and destruction of enemy aircraft and missiles in all weather conditions to establish and maintain local air superiority. All weather offensive air-to-surface attacks, detection, localization, and destruction of enemy ships and submarines to establish and maintain local sea control. Aerial photographic, sighting, and electronic intelligence for naval and joint operations. Airborne early warning service to fleet forces and shore warning nets. Airborne electronic countermeasures. In-flight refueling operations to extend the range and the endurance of air wing aircraft and search and rescue operations.

== Subordinate units ==
CVW-9 consists of 8 squadrons.

Code	Insignia	Squadron	Nickname	Assigned Aircraft
VFA-14		Strike Fighter Squadron 14	Tophatters	F/A-18E Super Hornet
VFA-41		Strike Fighter Squadron 41	Black Aces	F/A-18F Super Hornet
VMFA-314		Marine Fighter Attack Squadron 314	Black Knights	F-35C Lightning II
VFA-151		Strike Fighter Squadron 151	Vigilantes	F/A-18E Super Hornet
VAQ-133		Electronic Attack Squadron 133	Wizards	EA-18G Growler
VAW-117		Carrier Airborne Early Warning Squadron 117	Wallbangers	E-2D Hawkeye
VRM-30		Fleet Logistics Multi-Missions Squadron 30, Det. 2	Titans	CMV-22B Osprey
HSC-14		Helicopter Sea Combat Squadron 14	Chargers	MH-60S Seahawk
HSM-71		Helicopter Maritime Strike Squadron 71	Raptors	MH-60R Seahawk

== History ==
=== Cold War years (1952–1991) ===
CVW-9 was established as Carrier Air Group Nine (CVG-9) on 26 March 1952 (it was the third Carrier Air Group to carry the CVG-9 designation). It made its first deployment aboard USS Philippine Sea (CV-47) in January 1953 participating in operations at the close of the Korean War. From 1954 to 1958, CVG-9 made an Around the World Cruise aboard USS Hornet (CV-12) and two Western Pacific deployments aboard USS Oriskany (CV-34) and USS Ticonderoga (CV-14).

In February 1960, Carrier Air Group 9 embarked in USS Ranger (CVA-61) for a seven-month Western Pacific cruise. The aircraft complement at the time included F-8 Crusader, F2H Banshee, A-4 Skyhawk, FJ-1 Fury and AD-1 Skyraider. On 20 December 1963 the Navy redesignated all Carrier Air Groups to Carrier Air Wings and CVG-9 became Carrier Air Wing Nine (CVW-9). Three additional deployments to Western Pacific aboard USS Ranger (CVA-61) included two Vietnam cruises. CVW-9 made seven subsequent Vietnam deployments aboard USS Enterprise (CVN-65), USS America (CVA-66) and USS Constellation (CV-64).

Later, the Air Wing made peacetime cruises to the Western Pacific aboard USS Constellation, USS Ranger and USS Kitty Hawk (CV-63) between June 1974 and June 1987. CVW-9 was assigned to USS Nimitz (CVN-68) in July 1987, completing the first Nimitz/Nine Western Pacific cruise in February 1989. The Air Wing completed a West to East Coast transit aboard USS Constellation (CV-64) in April 1990 before returning to USS Nimitz (CVN-68) to participate in post-Desert Storm operations from March to August 1991.

=== 1990s ===
From February through August 1993, and again in November 1995 through May 1996, the Nimitz/Nine team completed deployments to the Persian Gulf, supporting United Nations sanctions against Iraq in Operation Southern Watch. During the May 1996 deployment, the Battle Group sortied from the Gulf to conduct contingency operation off the coast of Taiwan. One month into their 1997/1998 around the world cruise, the Nimitz/Nine team responded to the Secretary of Defense's order to proceed to the Persian Gulf at best speed to reinforce the Southern "No Fly Zone" over Iraq and provide a presence amid the crisis which led to Operation Desert Fox. CVW-9 ended its association with USS Nimitz (CVN-68) in March, 1998, and deployed in 2000 on USS John C. Stennis (CVN-74) as part of the Carrier Group Seven.

=== 2000s ===
Following the 11 September attacks, the Stennis/Nine team provided air protection to the West Coast of the United States in support of Operation Noble Eagle. Shortly after, the Stennis/Nine team deployed to North Arabian Sea/Indian Ocean flying combat missions over Afghanistan in support of Operation Enduring Freedom before returning to homeport May 2002.

CVW-9 made another deployment less than nine months after returning home in January 2003 to the Western Pacific aboard the USS Carl Vinson (CVN-70). Operations included maritime patrol, security operations and participation with allied navies in joint operations and training.

In 2005 CVW-9 made an Around the World Cruise aboard the USS Carl Vinson (CVN-70) as part of Carrier Strike Group Three. During this cruise the air wing took part in combat operations during Operation Iraqi Freedom and Operation Enduring Freedom as well as Maritime Security Operations with allied forces in the Persian Gulf. CVW-9 squadrons embarked on board the Carl Vinson for the deployment included VMFA-323, VFA-154, VFA-147, VFA-146, VAQ-138, VAW-112, VS-33, HS-8 and Detachment 4 of Fleet VRC-40.

During the deployment, the air wing logged 2,600 flight hours by its four F-18 strike-fighter squadrons. This overseas deployment marked the final overseas mission for Sea Control Squadron 33 (VS-33), the Screwbirds.

On 12 January 2006 aboard the USS Midway (CV-41) Carrier Air Wing Nine held a historic change of command where United States Marine Corps Col. Doug 'Smash' Yurovich became the first Marine commanding officer of a Navy carrier air wing after relieving Captain Michael Spence, as part of the Navy Department's integrated tactical air assets program.

CVW-9 is (as of March, 2007) currently deployed aboard the USS John C. Stennis (CVN-74) in the Fifth Fleet area of responsibility as part of Carrier Strike Group Three.

CVW-9 deployed with USS John C. Stennis on a scheduled Western Pacific deployment on 13 January 2009. CVW-9 returned to the United States on 6 July 2009 after participating in operations in the Persian Gulf, exercises with Japan Maritime Self Defense Force and annual exercises as Foal Eagle with the Republic of Korea and joint exercise Northern Edge 2009. Upon completion of this deployment, VFA-154, and VFA-146 were replaced by VFA-41, and VFA-14.

=== 2010s ===
CVW-9 deployed again with USS John C. Stennis on a scheduled deployment on 29 July 2011 and returned to the United States on 27 February 2012 after participating in Operation Enduring Freedom (OEF). Aircraft from Carrier Air Wing Nine were the last aircraft to conduct combat missions over Iraq, ending Operation New Dawn.

Following a 5-month down period, CVW-9 deployed again with USS John C. Stennis on a scheduled deployment from August 2012 to April 2013 in support of 5th Fleet operations and Operation Enduring Freedom (OEF). USS John C. Stennis (CVN-74) and Carrier Air Wing (CVW) 9 collectively earned the 2012 Ramage Award for carrier/air wing operational excellence 26 March 2012. The Navy-wide award, named for Rear Adm. James "Jig Dog" Ramage, a legendary World War II ace, recognizes the top aircraft carrier/air wing team for best performance as an integrated unit and excellence in Navy aircraft carrier operations. VAQ-136 joined CVW-9 on 1 June 2013 making them the first EA-18G Growler squadron in the airwing's history. After a short stay, VAQ-136 was replaced by CVW-9's previous Electronic Attack Squadron, VAQ-133, after successful completion of the transition from EA-6B to EA-18G aircraft.

From January through August 2016 CVW-9 executed a scheduled deployment to the Western Pacific, strengthening partnerships with allies in the region and executing freedom of navigation missions in the South China Sea.

In October 2018 CVW-9 began an around the world cruise on board USS John C. Stennis (CVN-74) as part of Carrier Strike Group Three that would take them through operations in the Western Pacific, South China Sea, Indian Ocean, Persian Gulf, Red Sea, Mediterranean Sea, and Atlantic Ocean. During this historic deployment CVW-9 squadrons conducted combat flights in support of Operations Inherent Resolve, Resolute Support and Freedom Sentinel over Afghanistan, Iraq, and Syria. Carrier Air Wing NINE squadrons returned to NAS Lemoore, North Island, Point Mugu, and Whidbey Island in May 2019.

=== 2020s ===
In May 2020, the Air wing transferred to the USS Abraham Lincoln (CVN-72). In early August 2024, the Air Wing was deployed on the USS Abraham Lincoln in response to heightened tensions between Iran and Israel.

== Current force ==
=== Fixed-wing aircraft ===
- F/A-18E Super Hornet
- F/A-18F Super Hornet
- F-35C Lightning II
- EA-18G Growler
- E-2D Hawkeye

=== Rotary wing aircraft ===
- MH-60S Seahawk
- MH-60R Seahawk
- CMV-22B Osprey

== Previous Air Groups designated Carrier Air Group Nine ==
The first CVG-9 was established on 1 Mar 1942, and disestablished 15 Oct 1945. The second was established as CVG-20 on 15 Oct 1943, was redesignated CVAG-9 on 15 Nov 1946 and CVG-9 (the second use of the designation) on 1 Sep 1948. It was disestablished on 1 Dec 1949. Neither of these two Air Groups share a lineage with Carrier Air Wing Nine.

== See also ==
- History of the United States Navy
- Official Website
