= VFA-146 =

Strike Fighter Squadron 146
- Active: 1 February 1956 - present
- Country: United States
- Branch: United States Navy
- Type: Fighter/Attack
- Role: Close air support Air interdiction Aerial reconnaissance
- Part of: Carrier Air Wing Seventeen
- Garrison/HQ: NAS Lemoore
- Nickname: "Blue Chumps"
- Engagements: Vietnam War; Iranian Hostage Crisis; Operation Earnest Will; Gulf War; Operation Southern Watch; 1996 Taiwan Strait Crisis; Operation Enduring Freedom; Iraq War; Operation Inherent Resolve
- Decorations: Presidential Unit Citation; Battle "E", 1997; Michael J. Estocin Award, 1997; Wade McClusky Award, 1997; Scott F. Kirby Award, 1997

Commanders
- Commanding Officer: CDR David J. Wrigley
- Executive Officer: CDR James E. Sheets
- Command Master Chief: CMDCM Casey A. Wheeler

Aircraft flown
- Attack: A-4 Skyhawk; A-7 Corsair II
- Fighter: F9F Cougar; FJ-4B Fury; F/A-18C (N) Hornet; F/A-18E Super Hornet

Strike Fighter Squadron 146 (VFA-146) also known as the "Blue Diamonds" is a United States Navy operational fleet strike fighter squadron based at Naval Air Station Lemoore California. They fly the F/A-18E Super Hornet and are attached to Carrier Air Wing 17 (CVW 17), deployed aboard USS Nimitz. Their tailcode is NA and their radio callsign is Diamond.

== Squadron Insignia and Nickname ==
The first insignia for VA-146 was approved by CNO on 23 November 1956, consisting of two concentric circles, a yellow mach wave symbol and a yellow globe showing North and South America. The first nickname the squadron reported to have used was Blacktails. This name was in reference to the black color assigned to the squadron's position in the air group. The nickname Blue Diamonds was adopted by the squadron sometime in the late 1950s. In 1968 the squadron elected to simplify their insignia and bring it in concert with their nickname. Their current insignia was revised and approved on 29 August 1968.

== History ==
=== 1950s ===
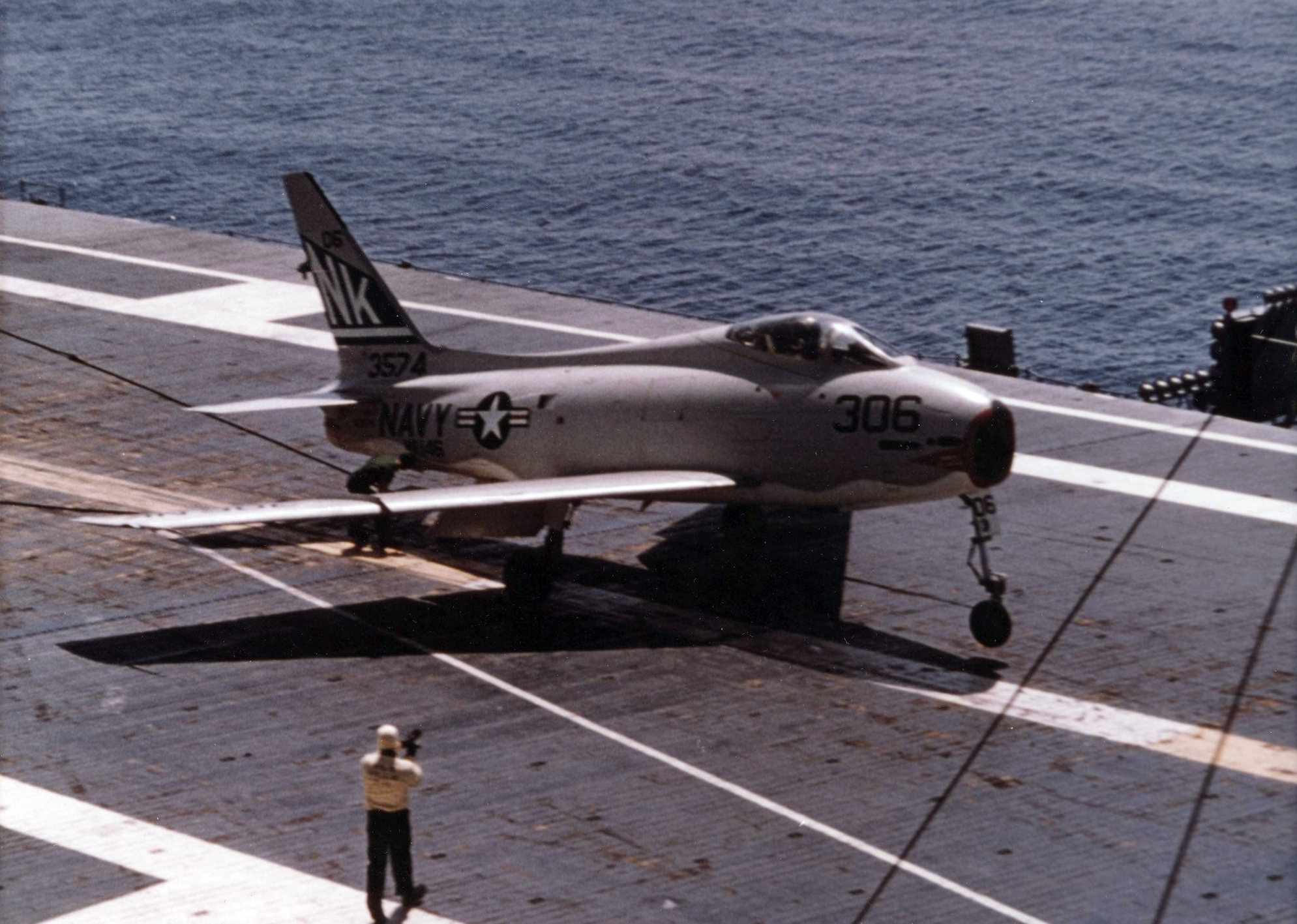
VA-146 FJ-4B Fury on USS Bennington, in 1958.

On 1 February 1956 Attack Squadron 146 (VA-146) became the Navy's newest jet attack squadron at NAS Miramar. Since there were no fleet replacement squadrons at this time, VA-146 started with only a handful of aircraft and began an "in-house" training regime in various models of the F9F Cougar. Their first deployment was aboard USS Hornet in 1957. In September 1957, the squadron transitioned to the FJ-4B Fury, deploying twice aboard USS Ranger prior to 1960.

=== 1960s ===
On 17 January 1960, VA-146 Furys participated in a coast-to-coast non-stop cross-country flight.

The squadron deployed Furys aboard USS Oriskany and USS Lexington.

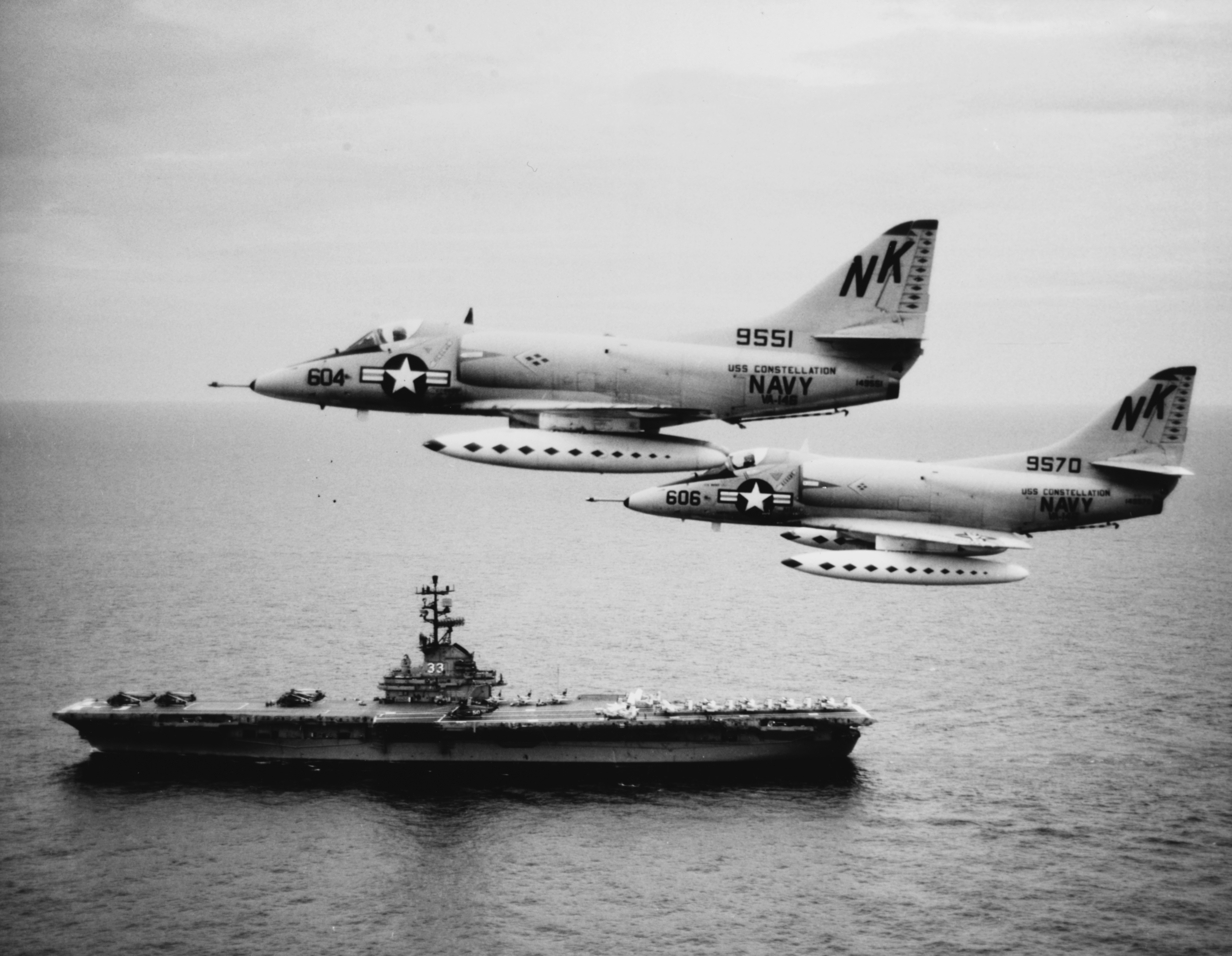
VA-146 A-4Cs in August 1964

In May 1962 the squadron moved to NAS Lemoore, and transitioned to the A-4 Skyhawk in June 1962. The squadron's first Skyhawk deployment was to the Western Pacific aboard USS Constellation.

From June to September 1964, while operating from USS Constellation off Yankee Station, VA-146 participated in photo reconnaissance missions over Laos. The squadron's A-4C Skyhawks were used to provide tanker and rocket-armed escort support for the photo reconnaissance sorties over Laos and South Vietnam. During this time, VA-146 aircraft also flew night sorties in support of DESOTO Patrol operations (the collection of signal intelligence) conducted by American destroyers operating in international waters off the coast of North Vietnam. In response to North Vietnamese torpedo boat attacks against USS Maddox and USS Turner Joy on 2 August 1964, VA-146 participated in Operation Pierce Arrow, retaliatory air strikes against North Vietnamese targets which resulted in the sinking or damaging of 8 torpedo boats, and marked the first use of the A-4 in combat.

On 29 June 1966, a 28-plane strike of VA-146 and other CVW-14 aircraft flying from USS Ranger struck the Haiphong Petroleum storage complex, the first American strike against this complex.

In December 1968 under the instruction of VA-125, VA-146 transitioned to the A-7B Corsair II. The squadron received its first A-7 on 4 June 1968 and deployed aboard USS Enterprise on 6 January 1969. Shortly after deployment in September 1969, the squadron upgraded to the A-7E.

=== 1970s ===
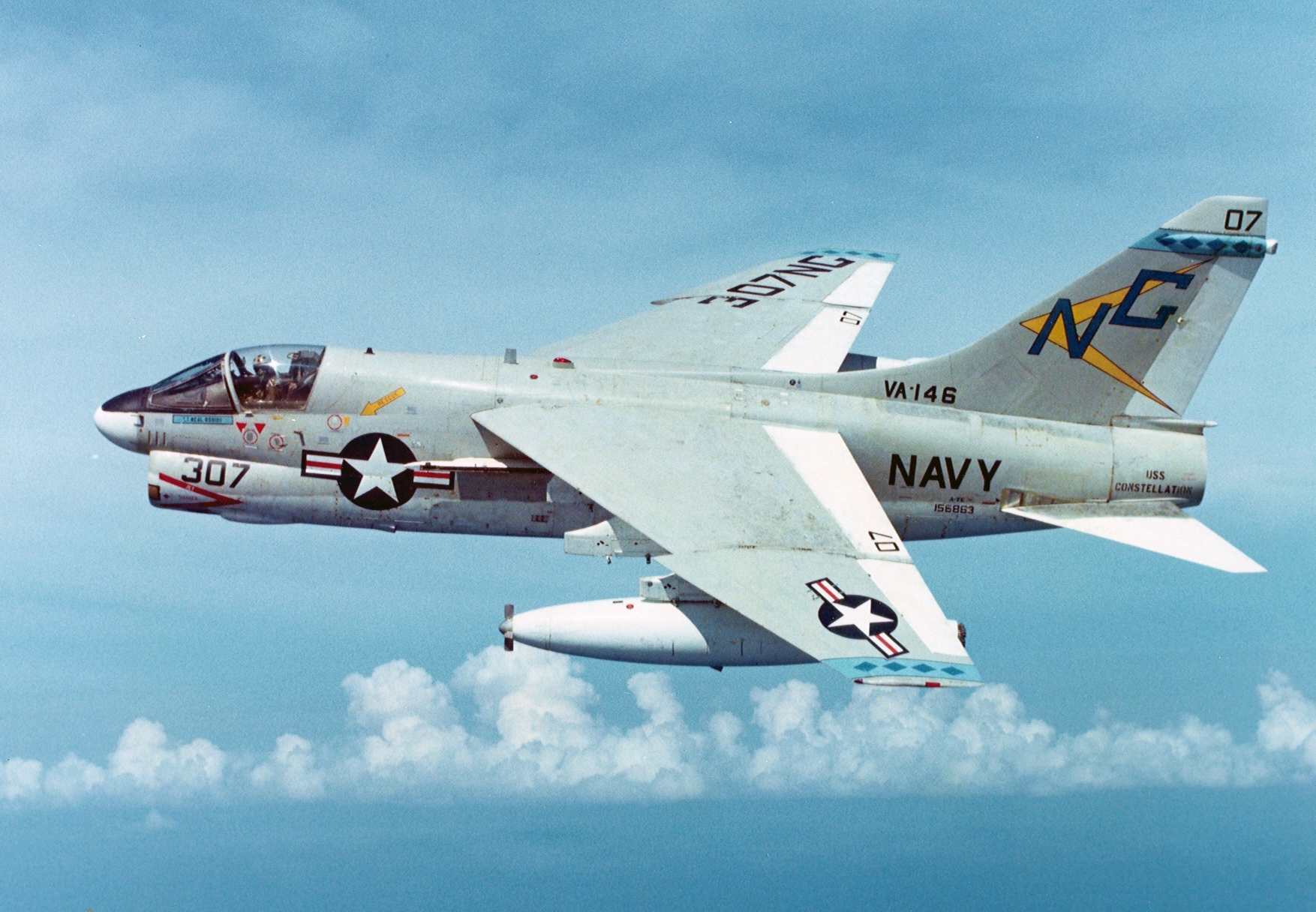
VA-146 A-7E Corsair II, in 1974.

In April 1970, the squadron embarked aboard USS America at NS Norfolk for her extended combat deployment to Vietnam, returning in December 1970. In December 1971, VA-146 became the first Navy squadron to use a laser-guided bomb (LGB) in combat. In May 1972 the squadron's A-7Es conducted night mining missions to North Vietnamese rivers. On 5 January 1973, VA-146 headed west with Carrier Air Wing Nine (CVW-9) embarked again on USS Constellation. This cruise would bring to an end Navy's participation in the Vietnam War. For the deployment, USS Constellation and CVW 9 were awarded the Presidential Unit Citation.

In November 1974, while aboard USS Constellation, VA-146 operated in the Persian Gulf, the first time in 26 years that an American carrier had entered and operated there.

=== 1980s ===
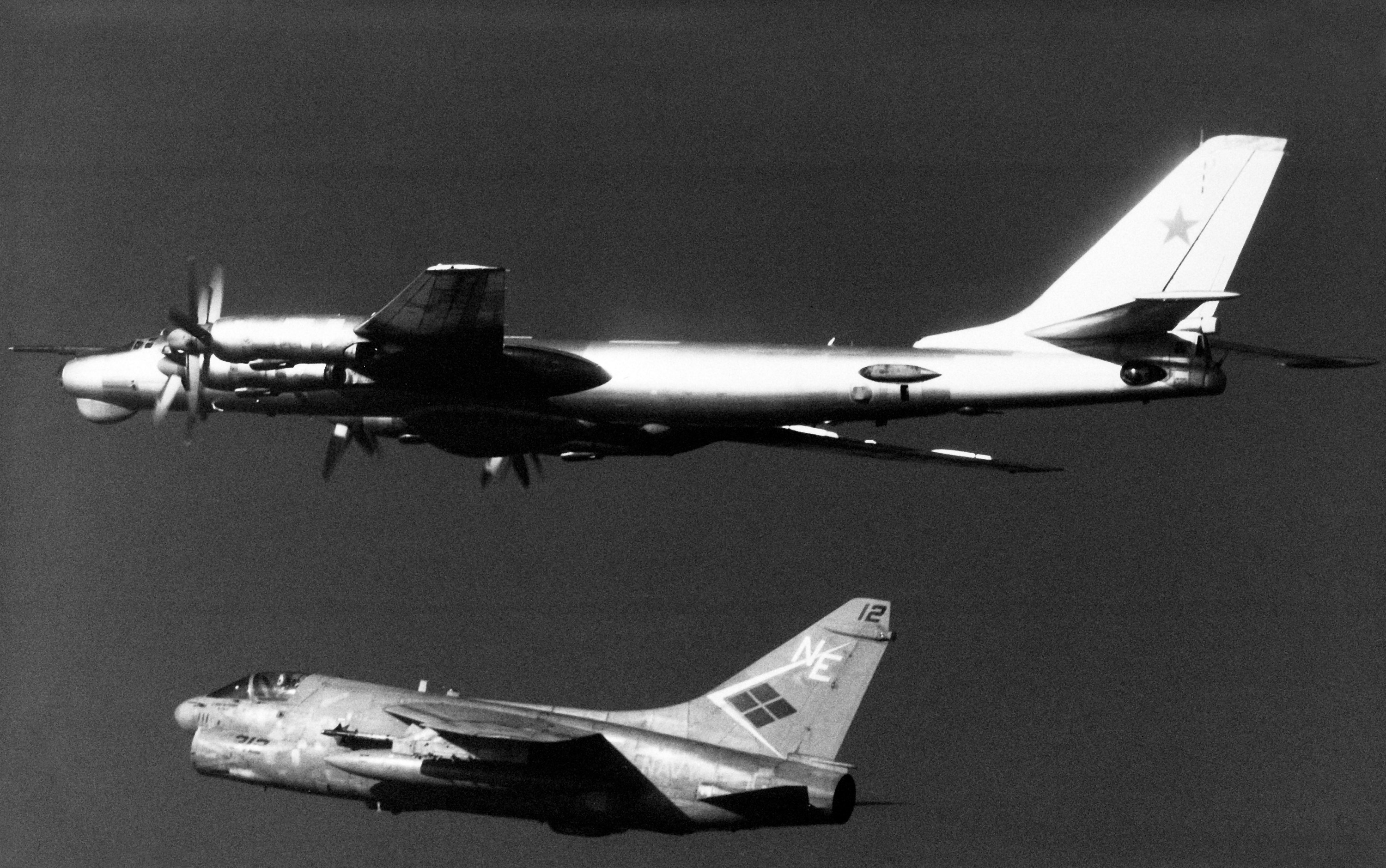
A Soviet Tu-95RT Bear-D being intercepted by an A-7E Corsair II from VA-146 in 1984.

In early 1980, VA-146 was named the safest A-7 squadron in combined Navy-Air Force history by surpassing all previous records for accident-free flight operations at 36,175 hours. In February 1980, VA-146 made the first Pacific deployment with the new Forward Looking Infrared (FLIR) system installed on the A-7. During the 1980 deployment aboard USS Constellation, the squadron spent 110 days at sea, the longest continuous at-sea period for any West Coast carrier since World War II.

In 1983 the squadron was tasked with fleet introduction of the HARM missile system, and their 14-year association with CVW-9 was broken when VA-146 was reassigned to Carrier Air Wing 2. Upon their return from a WestPac deployment aboard USS Kitty Hawk in August 1984, the squadron was again reassigned to CVW-9. In September 1988, VA-146 embarked aboard USS Nimitz for a Western Pacific deployment. The highlight of this cruise were operations in the Sea of Japan during the 1988 Summer Olympics. The next month, Nimitz, with VA-146 embarked, participated in Operation Earnest Will, the escorting of reflagged Kuwaiti tankers through the Persian Gulf.

On 21 July 1989, VA-146 was redesignated Strike Fighter Squadron ONE HUNDRED FORTY SIX (VFA-146), and they received their first F/A-18C Night Attack Hornet on 18 November 1989.

=== 1990s ===
The squadron deployed aboard the Nimitz with the rest of CVW-9 to take part in Operation Southern Watch on 27 November 1995. During their transit to the Persian Gulf, they crossed through the Taiwan Strait in December 1995 during the beginning of tensions between the PRC (Mainland China) and the ROC (Taiwan). Towards the end of the cruise, they were once again took part in Operations near the Taiwan Strait during the 1996 Crisis. VFA-146 spent the majority of 1997 preparing for a World Cruise aboard Nimitz, and extended their 13-year history of over 55,000 hours without a Class "A" safety mishap. The highlight of the work-up cycle was a 96-hour sortie surge operation in which they flew 226 sorties. On 4 September 1997, the squadron departed San Diego with the USS Nimitz Battle Group in support of Operation Southern Watch. Shortly after their return to NAS Lemoore, the squadron was named the 1997 COMNAVAIRPAC Battle "E" winner and Scott F. Kirby Ordnance Proficiency Award winner, and also received the US Navy's Michael J. Estocin Award for meritorious achievement by a strike fighter squadron and C. Wade McClusky as most outstanding attack squadron.

=== 2000s ===
On 12 November 2001, the squadron deployed with CVW-9 on USS John C. Stennis to conduct combat operations in support of Operation Enduring Freedom over Afghanistan. The squadron deployed two months early in response to the September 11 attacks. Port calls on the way included Hong Kong and Singapore arriving in the North Arabian Sea. On 12 December 2001, the squadron began their first night strikes into Afghanistan. The missions ranged from 4.5 to 6.0 hours with help from the Roosevelt Battle Group and the Kennedy Battle Group. The squadron amassed over 3,500 flight hours and delivering over 102,000 pounds of ordnance. Milestones included extending their Top Hook Award streak to 24 after the first line period. Weapons included the JDAM, Laser Guided Bombs, and Mark 82 bombs. The squadron returned at the end of May 2002 after a stopover in Australia and a Tiger Cruise from Hawaii.

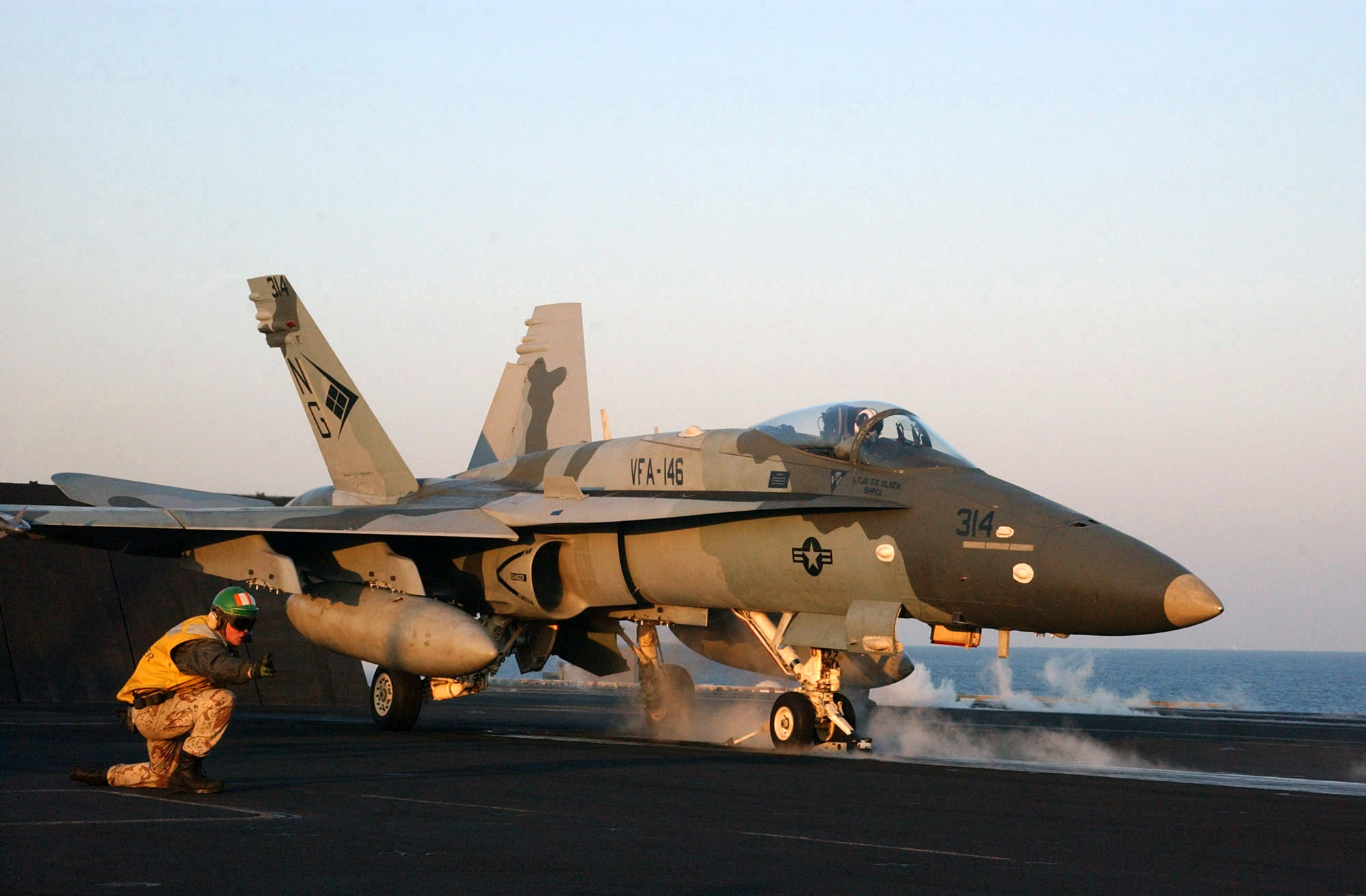
VFA-146 F/A-18C launches from USS Carl Vinson, in 2003.

VFA-146 began its 27th deployment on board USS Carl Vinson (CVN-70) on 15 January 2003. The Blue Diamonds and the CWV-9 team were attached to 7th Fleet in the Sea of Japan as a power projection asset. It was the first "traditional" WESTPAC for the Blue Diamonds in several years. The deployment lasted 8 months to the day, getting our Sailors home on 17 September 2003.

The squadron began a cruise aboard USS Carl Vinson on 17 January 2005. The "around-the-world" deployment took them across the Pacific and Indian Oceans into the Persian Gulf. For three months the squadron, along with the rest of CVW-9, flew missions in support of Operation Iraqi Freedom. USS Carl Vinson then turned south to steam around the Sinai Peninsula into the Red Sea, through the Suez Canal, the Mediterranean Sea, then across the Atlantic. On 31 July 2005, USS Carl Vinson pulled into its new homeport of Naval Station Norfolk for a scheduled nuclear refuelling.

On 18 January 2007, the Blue Diamonds deployed again on board USS John C. Stennis (CVN-74). For the next six months, the Diamonds flew combat missions in support of Operations ENDURING FREEDOM and IRAQI FREEDOM. The squadron reached an incredible milestone of 22 consecutive years with no Class A mishaps, extending their outstanding safety record to more than 92,000 mishap-free flight hours. Additionally, VFA-146 flew more than 400 combat sorties, encompassing over 2,500 flight hours during a highly dynamic deployment. Exceptional maintenance support led to the squadron's extraordinary combat performance in achieving a weapons effectiveness rate of 95% while delivering more than 23,000 pounds of ordnance and over 5,000 rounds of 20 mm in support of Coalition Forces. The command's attention to detail and tremendous pride were integral to daily operations, and resulted in the Blue Diamonds earning the CVW-9 "Golden Wrench Award" for maintenance excellence during the 2007 deployment.

On 17 January 2009, the Blue Diamonds embarked on USS John C. Stennis (CVN-74) for the beginning of their WESTPAC deployment. The Carrier Strike Group Three and CVW-9 team helped reinforce foreign diplomacy and international relations by participating in the Foal Eagle exercise off the coast of Korea. On their return home, the Blue Diamonds pulled into Hawaii before steaming north to participate in Northern Edge with the United States Air Force off the coast of Alaska. On 6 July 2009, CVN-74 pulled into San Diego marking the end of an era on board Stennis. Before departing CVW-9, the Blue Diamonds earned the 2009 Bruce Carrier award for maintenance excellence.

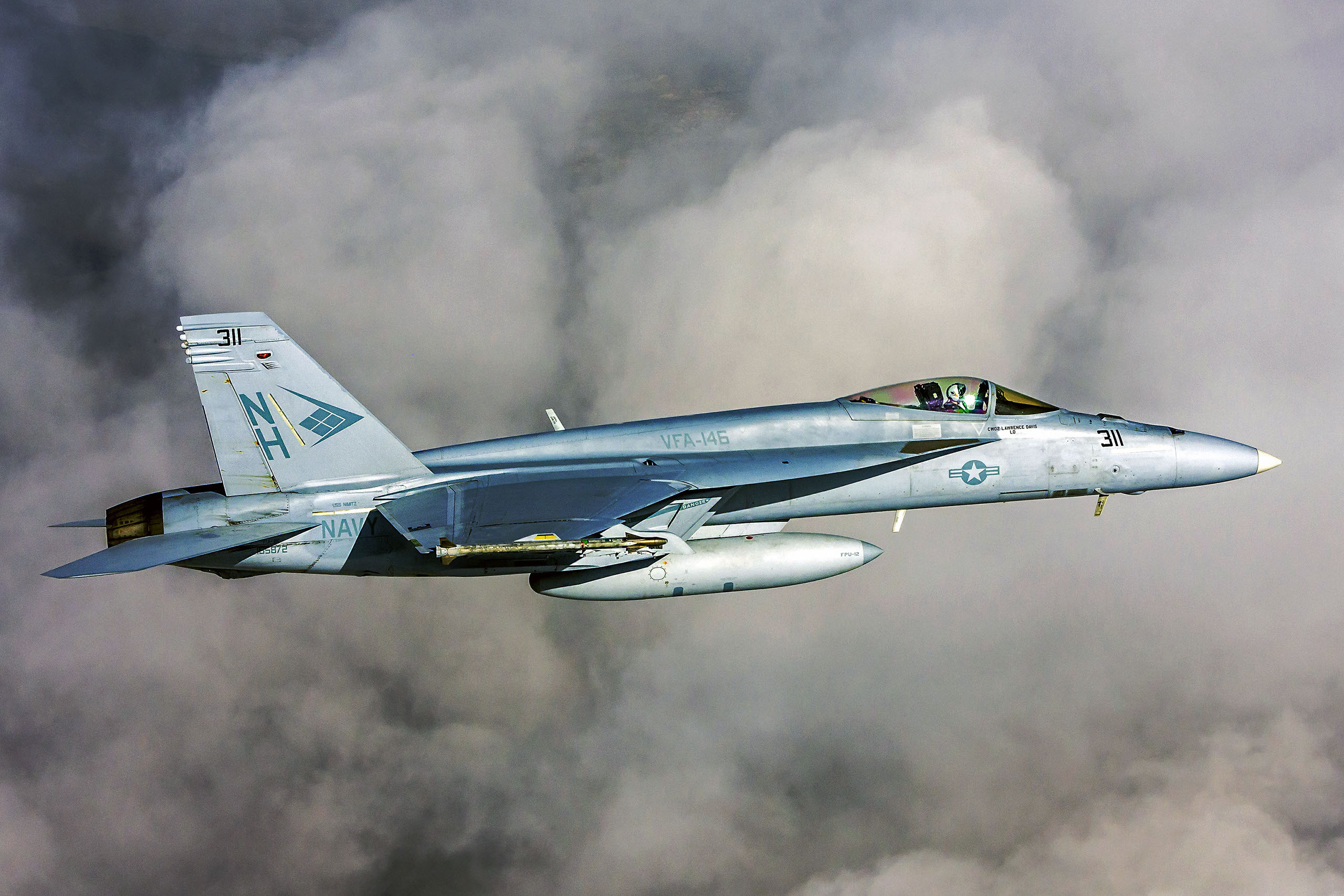
VFA-146 F/A-18E Super Hornet, in 2015.

=== 2010s ===
In 2015, VFA-146 transitioned from the F/A-18C to the newer F/A-18E Super Hornet.

In 2020, VFA-146 accompanying Carrier Air Wing Eleven, Deployed aboard the USS Theodore Roosevelt.

In 2022, VFA-146 Transferred to Carrier Air Wing 17.

== See also ==
- Naval aviation
- Modern US Navy carrier air operations
- List of United States Navy aircraft squadrons
