= VAQ-138 =

Electronic Attack Squadron 138
- Active: 27 February 1976 - Present (50 years, 4 months)
- Country: United States
- Branch: United States Navy
- Type: Electronic Attack
- Role: Electronic Warfare
- Part of: Electronic Attack Wing Pacific
- Garrison/HQ: NAS Whidbey Island
- Nickname: Yellowjackets
- Motto: "Nihil minor quam optime" - "Nothing less than the best"
- Colors: #fae600 #000000
- Engagements: Vietnam War; Operation Prairie; Operation El Dorado Canyon; Gulf War; Operation Desert Storm; Iraqi no-fly zones conflict; Operation Provide Comfort; Operation Southern Watch Operation Allied Force; War on terror; Operation Enduring Freedom; Iraq War; Operation New Dawn Operation Epic Fury
- Decorations: Safety "S" (2); Battle "E" (2); Admiral Arthur W. Radford Award (2); Prowler Maintenance Squadron of the Year; Golden Anchor Award; Prowler Safety Squadron of the Year
- Website: https://www.airpac.navy.mil/Organization/Electronic-Attack-Squadron-VAQ-138/

Commanders
- Commanding Officer: CDR. David “Nard Dog” Leisenring
- Executive Officer: CDR. Evan “Corky” Coleman
- Command Master Chief: CMDCM. Dennisha J. McElveen

Insignia
- Callsign: RAMPAGE
- Modex: 51X
- Tail Code: NL

Aircraft flown
- Electronic warfare: EA-6B Prowler(1976-2010); EA-18G Growler(2010-Present)

Electronic Attack Squadron 138 (VAQ-138), also known as the "Yellow Jackets", is an expeditionary EA-18G Growler squadron of the United States Navy based at Naval Air Station Whidbey Island, Washington.

== Squadron history ==
=== 1970s–1990s ===
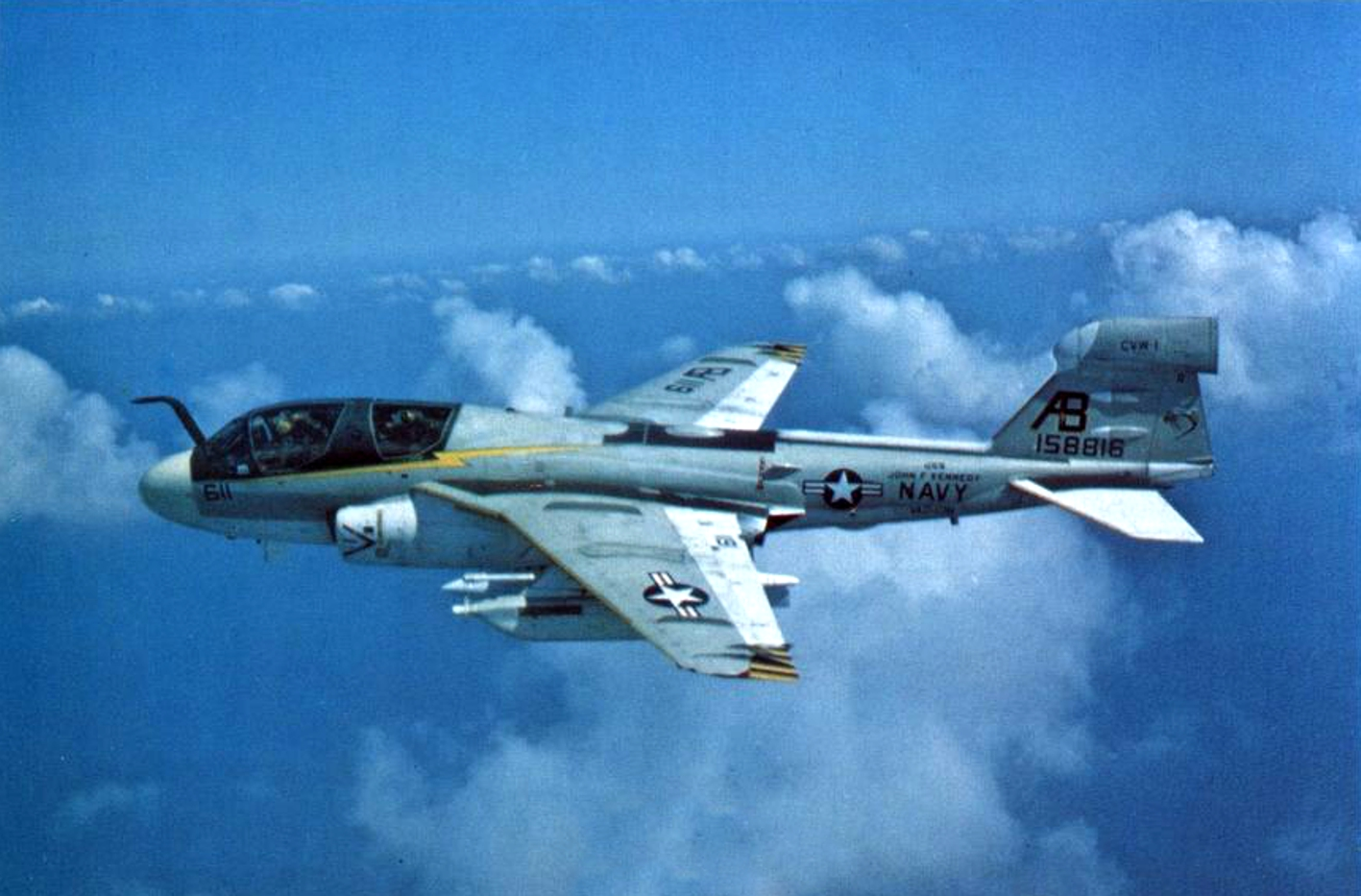
Grumman EA-6B Prowler of VAQ-138 in flight, circa 1980

VAQ-138 was established as an operational squadron in February 1976 and made its first deployment aboard USS Saratoga to the Mediterranean Sea. The squadron completed three more deployments to the Mediterranean Sea aboard USS Dwight D. Eisenhower and USS John F. Kennedy during the late 1970s and early 1980s. Following the Mediterranean/Indian Ocean cruise in 1982 aboard Kennedy, the squadron joined USS Ranger for a deployment to the Western Pacific and Indian Ocean in 1983. After 1984, the squadron made eight deployments aboard USS Nimitz, participating in Central American operations in 1985, the Libya airstrikes in 1986, Operations Desert Storm and Provide Comfort in 1991, and Operation Southern Watch in 1993, 1996, and a 1997–1998 around-the-world deployment.

In November 1996 the squadron filled a two-month gap in EA-6B coverage at Marine Corps Air Station Iwakuni, Japan. Upon their return, workups were started for an around-the-world cruise on USS Nimitz. Following their 1997–1998 Persian Gulf deployment the squadron was awarded the 1997 Admiral Arthur W. Radford Award, the 1997 Battle Efficiency Award, the 1997 CNO Aviation Safety Award, and the 1998 Golden Anchor Award.

In April 1999, VAQ-138 deployed to Aviano Air Base, Italy to conduct combat operations over Serbia and Kosovo during Operation Allied Force. While deployed to Aviano, the squadron flew over 500 combat sorties and fired more than 60 AGM-88 HARM against Serbian targets. Three weeks after returning from Italy, the squadron began work-ups aboard USS John C. Stennis, which culminated in a Western Pacific and Persian Gulf deployment, during which they conducted two and a half months of missions in support of Operation Southern Watch.

=== 2000 ===
The September 11, 2001 attacks found the squadron underway for work-ups aboard USS John C. Stennis, and resulted in an accelerated work-up cycle and deployment to the Northern Persian Gulf. The squadron commenced combat operations in support of Operation Enduring Freedom on 17 December 2001, and included missions in support of Operation Anaconda. The squadron returned to NAS Whidbey Island following seven months of deployment in June 2002.

In September 2002, the squadron began work-ups for an eight-month deployment to the Western Pacific from January though September 2003. During this time, the squadron transitioned to the Block 89A configuration of the EA-6B, and conducted the first operational deployment of the Block 89A. During the deployment, the squadron executed detachments to Kadena Air Base, Okinawa; MCAS Iwakuni, Japan; Andersen Air Force Base, Guam, and Naval Air Facility Atsugi, Japan and participated in Exercise Foal Eagle in Korea.

The squadron departed San Diego in February 2005 and sailed into Norfolk, Virginia, on the last day of July after flying over 300 combat sorties and amassing over 1600 combat flight hours during four months of supporting Operation Iraqi Freedom.

VAQ-138 departed Naval Air Station North Island, California on 18 January 2007 for USS John C. Stennis to begin their seven-month Western pacific deployment with Carrier Air Wing Nine (CVW-9), during which they supported the ongoing operations in Afghanistan and Iraq.

The squadron amassed over 650 flight hours consisting of combat missions over Afghanistan and Iraq. During their 2007 WESTPAC, the four EA-6B ICAP III Prowlers of VAQ-138 logged over 1,700 flight hours, and achieved a 96% combat sortie completion rate.

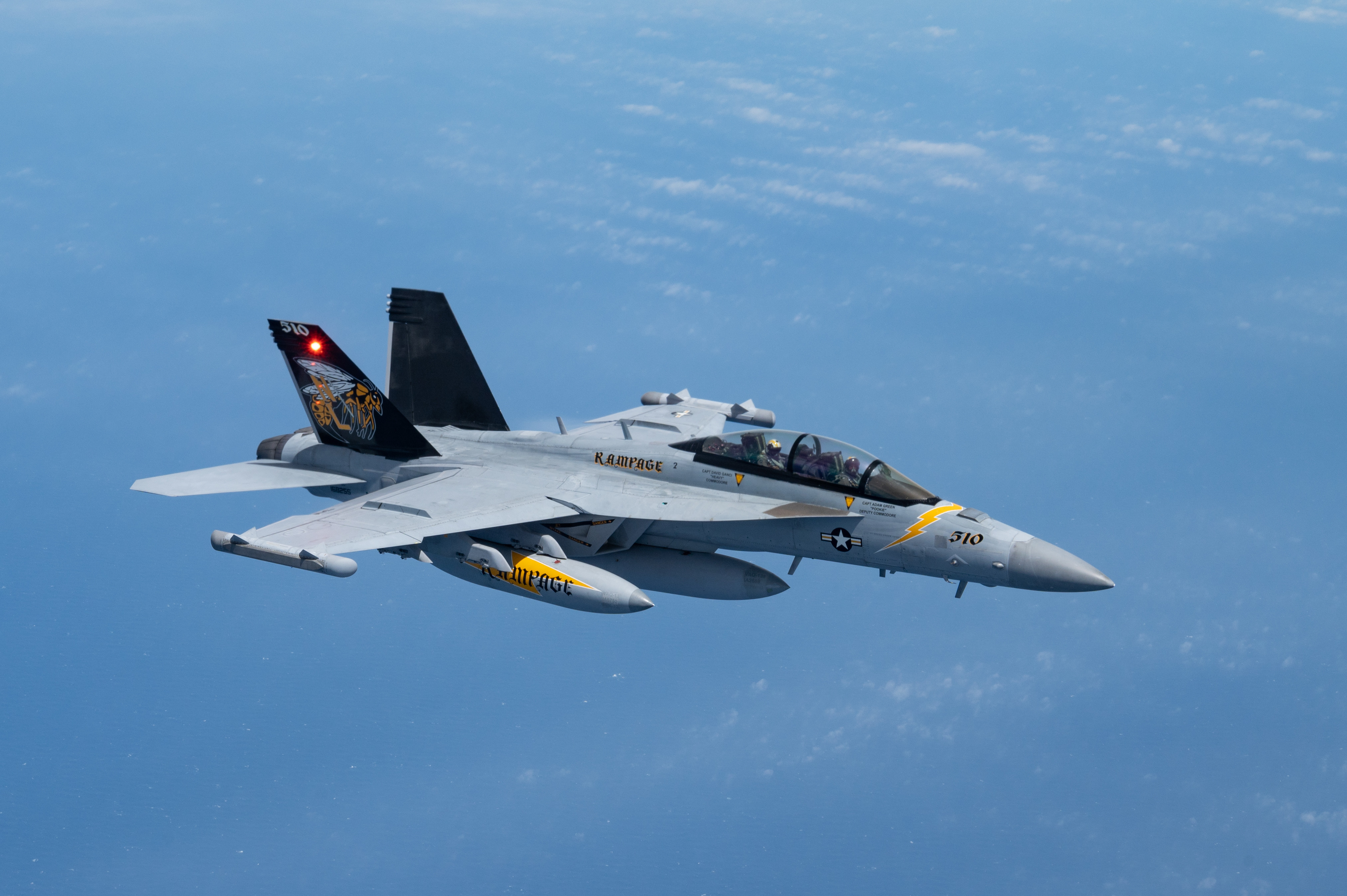
VAQ-138 EA-18G in 2024

=== 2010–present ===
Following their 2009 cruise on board USS John C. Stennis, the squadron began transitioning to the EA-18G Growler. They were certified 'Safe for Flight' in their new aircraft in August 2010.

VAQ-138 deployed to land bases, from June to 23 December 2011 they were based at Al Asad AB, Iraq. From August 2014 to 8 February 2015 they were based at Misawa AFB, Japan, and again from April to October 2016. While deployed to Misawa AFB in 2016, VAQ-138 sent a detachment to Clark AB, Philippines from June to July, followed by another detachment sent to Andersen AFB, Guam from July to August to participate in Exercise VALIANT SHIELD.

In January 2017, VAQ-138 flew to Nellis AFB, Nevada, to take part in RED FLAG 17–1 in preparation for a PACOM deployment starting in March. From March to October, VAQ-138 was stationed in Misawa, Japan with detachments participating in joint exercises in South Korea and Guam.

Starting in March 2018, the cycle begins again with VAQ-138 flying to Nellis AFB, Nevada, for RED FLAG 18–2. From May to December, the Rampaging Yellow Jackets once again found themselves stationed at Misawa, Japan for one of their most busy deployments yet by participating in the following exercises: MALABAR (Guam), THROWING KNIVES (Japan), NUDAY HUNTER (Guam), VALIANT SHIELD (Guam), PACIFIC THUNDER (South Korea), and KEEN SWORD (Japan).

After finishing the 2018 deployment, 2019's training cycle started in February for the squadron's first trip to NAS Fallon for a missile shoot. The next trip to Fallon lasted just shy of two weeks, beginning 31 March; the final trip to Fallon occurred in mid June, also for two weeks. In between the detachments, three times throughout 2019, VAQ-138 supported GTI operations in Fallon. The final detachment took the Rampaging Yellow Jackets up to Eielson AFB, Alaska, for a red flag integration exercise with various platforms from the United States Air Force. In October 2019, VAQ-138 was sent West, back to Misawa AFB, Japan, in support of Seventh Fleet and national tasking requirements. While on detachment, the Yellow Jackets seized the opportunity to partner with the esteemed F-16 "Wild Weasels" of the 13th Fighter Squadron to accomplish unique training opportunities, increasing joint capabilities.

Towards the end of January in 2019, while still stationed at Misawa AFB, a detachment was sent to Andersen AFB, Guam, to participate in Cope North for 5 weeks. At Cope North, VAQ-138 integrated with the Royal Australian Air Force (RAAF), Japanese Air Self-Defense Force (JASDF), United States Air Force (USAF), and the United States Marine Corps (USMC) assets to conduct multiple simulated large force strike. By the end of April, VAQ-138 and completed their mission and returned home to Whidbey Island, Washington. Later that year, the squadron played a role in Gunfighter Flag: a multi-branch/international integration exercise at Mountain Home AFB, Idaho, to practice SEAD (suppression of enemy air defenses). The highlight of 2020 for VAQ-138 took place in September, as the squadron made base history: becoming the first squadron to execute a high-speed anti-radiation missile (HARM) shoot from home base NASWI.

In late June 2026, VAQ-138 and their E/A-18Gs deployed to the CENTCOM AOR via NAS Oceana and Lajes AB. Following their arrival in theater, VAQ-138 began combat operations against Iran with Operation Epic Fury.

== See also ==
- Naval aviation
- Modern US Navy carrier air operations
- List of United States Navy aircraft squadrons
