= Carrier Strike Group 2 =

- Carrier Strike Group 2's Emblem
- Founded: 1 October 2004; 22 years ago
- Country: United States of America
- Branch: United States Navy
- Type: Carrier Strike Group
- Role: Naval air/surface warfare
- Part of: United States Fleet Forces Command
- Garrison/HQ: Naval Station Norfolk, Virginia
- Nickname: Dwight D. Eisenhower Carrier Strike Group
- Engagements: War in Afghanistan; Iraq War: Operation Steel Curtain; War on ISIL: US intervention in the Syrian civil war; Red Sea crisis: Operation Prosperity Guardian
- Website: Official website

Commanders
- Commander: Rear Admiral P. Scott Miller, USN
- Chief of Staff: Commander James R. McMillan III, USN
- Command Master Chief: CMDCM David Dammon, USN
- Notable commanders: James A. Winnefeld, Jr. David M. Thomas; Nora W. Tyson; Frederick C. Turner

Aircraft flown
- Electronic warfare: EA-18G Growler
- Fighter: F/A-18E/F Super Hornet
- Helicopter: MH-60R Seahawk; MH-60S Knighthawk
- Reconnaissance: E-2C Hawkeye
- Transport: Grumman C-2 Greyhound

Carrier Strike Group 2 (CSG-2 or COMCARSTRKGRU 2) is a U.S. Navy carrier strike group, tracing its history originally to 1931. The aircraft carrier USS Dwight D. Eisenhower is the strike group's current flagship. As of September 2026, other units assigned to Carrier Strike Group 2 included the nine squadrons of Carrier Air Wing Three and the Arleigh Burke-class destroyers USS Mitscher (DDG-57), USS Laboon (DDG 58), USS Mahan (DDG-72), and USS Thomas Hudner (DDG-116) from Destroyer Squadron 22.

The group traces its history to the creation of Carrier Division 2 on 1 April 1931. The group took its current form on 1 October 2004. On 29 July 2010, Rear Admiral Nora W. Tyson assumed command of the group, becoming the first woman to command a U.S. Navy carrier task group. The group's 2011 Mediterranean deployment marked the maiden deployment for the carrier USS George H.W. Bush and the guided-missile destroyer Truxtun. The group's units were the first U.S. naval forces to participate in Operation Inherent Resolve, the 2014 U.S.-led multi-lateral air campaign against the Islamic State group.

== Historical background ==
On 1 April 1931, Rear Admiral Joseph M. Reeves took command of Carrier Division 2 (CarDiv 2), becoming the first carrier division commander in the U.S. Navy. Reeves was also designated as Commander Aircraft U.S. Fleet. Carrier Division 2 initially consisted of the U.S. Navy's first true fast aircraft carriers, Lexington and Saratoga, as well as former minesweeper Gannet which acted as an aircraft tender and guardship for the two carriers. Under Reeves' leadership, both carriers had previously distinguished themselves in two major naval exercises, the 1929 Fleet Problem IX and the 1930 Fleet Problem X, demonstrating the potential of aircraft carriers and their embarked air groups in naval offensive operations. Aircraft carriers from Carrier Division 2 became the first to embark U.S. Marine Corps aviation units when, on 2 November 1931, squadron VS-14M joined the Saratoga and squadron VS-15M joined the Lexington.

In 1933, Saratoga and Langley were assigned to Carrier Division 2, which was under the Commander Aircraft, Battle Force, while Lexington was reassigned to Carrier Division One under Commander Aircraft, Scouting Force. In February 1939, Carrier Division Two, now consisting of Yorktown and Enterprise, participated in the war game Fleet Problem XX. The scenario for the exercise called for one fleet to control the sea lanes in the Caribbean against the incursion of a foreign European power while maintaining sufficient naval strength to protect vital American interests in the Pacific. In December 1941, on the eve of the United States' entry into the Second World War, Carrier Division Two was under the command of Vice Admiral William Halsey Jr., who was also the Commander Aircraft Battle Force in the Pacific Ocean.

During the Second World War, aircraft carriers assigned to Carrier Division Two participated in the Doolittle Raid, the Battle of Midway, the Battle of the Santa Cruz Islands, Operation Hailstone, the Battle of the Philippine Sea, and the Battle of Leyte Gulf, as well as the Solomon Islands campaign, the Gilbert and Marshall Islands campaign, the Hollandia and Western New Guinea campaign, the Philippines Campaign, the Mariana and Palau Islands campaign, the Iwo Jima campaign, and the Okinawan campaign, as part of the Navy's Fast Carrier Task Force. Rear Admiral Frederick C. Sherman commanded the division in 1943 while it was operating with the Fast Carrier Task Force.

On 1 August 1955 the division was made up of USS Bennington (Newport) and USS Lake Champlain (flagship) at Mayport. Ranger sailed as the flagship of Rear Admiral H. H. Caldwell, Commander, Carrier Division 2, from Hawaii to join the Seventh Fleet in February 1959. Air operations off Okinawa were followed by maneuvers with naval units from U.S. Naval Base Subic Bay. A special weapons warfare exercise and a patrol along the southern seaboard of Japan followed. During this deployment, Ranger launched more than 7,000 sorties.

After the war, division aircraft carriers were involved in the Cuban Missile Crisis and the Vietnam War. USS Enterprise flew the flag of Commander Carrier Division 2 in 1963. Rear Admiral Bernard M. Strean, as division commander, led Enterprise, Long Beach, and Bainbridge around the world in Operation Sea Orbit from July to October 1964. 'Sea Orbit' was a successful test of the first all-nuclear-powered task force. On 25 September 1965, Rear Admiral J. O. Cobb broke his flag as Commander, Carrier Division 2, aboard USS America. The division was re-designated as Commander Carrier Group 2 (ComCarGru 2) in 1973.

In 1986, while commanding Carrier Group Two, Rear Admiral Jerry C. Breast commanded the Coral Sea carrier battle group and Task Group 60.1 of the U.S. Sixth Fleet during a series of naval maneuvers code-named Attain Document. These naval maneuvers were intended to assert the freedom of navigation in the Gulf of Sidra as well as to challenge the territorial claims of Libya to that body of water. Subsequently, the Coral Sea carrier battle group and the rest of Task Force 60 carried out Operation El Dorado Canyon, a series of punitive air-strikes against Libya in retaliations to the 1986 Berlin discotheque bombing.

On 15 August 1990, the group staff embarked in USS John F. Kennedy for a no-notification combat deployment in response to the Iraqi invasion of Kuwait. The battle group deployed for Operation Desert Storm only five days after notification, even though she had dispersed her air wing throughout the continental United States for training and just off-loaded stores and material in preparation for a routine yard period. Rear Admiral Riley Mixson, Commander, Carrier Group Two, acted as Commander, Battle Force Yankee of Naval Forces Central Command during the war. Battle Force Yankee included Saratoga and probably John F. Kennedy, and operated in the Red Sea.

In the middle of 1992, the U.S. Navy instituted a concept which mandated greater task group integration of naval air and surface warfare assets into a more permanent carrier battle group structure. Instead of routinely changing the cruisers, destroyers, and frigates assigned to each carrier battle group, there was an attempt made to affiliate certain escorts more permanently with the carriers they escorted. Each of the Navy's 12 existing carrier battle groups was planned to consist of an aircraft carrier; an embarked carrier air wing; cruiser, destroyer, and frigate units; and two nuclear-powered attack submarines. For details regarding this re-alignments as it pertained to Carrier Group Two, see the chart below.

Carrier Group Two, late 1992

Cruisers/Submarines	Destroyer Squadron 20		Carrier Air Wing 3 squadrons embarked aboard USS John F. Kennedy (CV-67)	
USS Cape St. George (CG-71)	USS O'Bannon (DD-987)	USS Halyburton (FFG-40)	Fighter Squadron 32: F-14B	Airborne Early Warning Sqd. 126: E-2C
USS Gettysburg (CG-64)	USS John Rodgers (DD-983)	USS Underwood (FFG-36)	Fighter Squadron 14: F-14B	Sea Control Squadron 38: S-3A
USS Leyte Gulf (CG-55)	USS Caron (DD-970)	USS Stark (FFG-31)	Strike Fighter Squadron 105: F/A-18C	Helicopter Anti-Submarine Sqd. 7: SH-3H
USS Wainwright (CG-28)	——	USS McInerney (FFG-8)	Strike Fighter Squadron 37: F/A-18C	——
USS Albuquerque (SSN-706)	——	——	Attack Squadron 75: A-6E, KA-6D	——
USS Seahorse (SSN-669)	——	——	Airborne Early Warning Sqd. 130: EA-6B	——

During its Mediterranean deployments, the Kennedy battle group flew large numbers of Operation Deny Flight no-fly zone missions over Bosnia-Herzegovina. The battle group also saw service with the U.S. Fifth Fleet in support Operation Southern Watch, the enforcement of a no-fly zone over southern Iraq. Commander Carrier Group Two also served as Commander Joint Task Force 120 during Operation Uphold Democracy, the 1994–1995 intervention designed to remove the military regime in Haiti installed by the 1991 Haitian coup d'état. It appears that Kennedy transferred to another carrier group in 1995, as the announced 31 August 1995, listing of Carrier Group Two's composition included USS John C. Stennis (CVN-74) and USS San Jacinto (CG-56). In addition, USS Monterey (CG-61) was intended to join the group in 1996–97. In September 1995, USS Hue City (CG-66) joined Carrier Group Two. Hue City was transferred from Carrier Group 2 to the Western Hemisphere Group on 1 August 1998.

The group deployed in 2000–01 led by Harry S. Truman (CVN-75).

Theodore Roosevelt was reassigned to the group effective 1 February 2004, and the carrier underwent its Docked Planned Incremental Availability overhaul at the Newport Naval Yard in Virginia between 10 August and 10 December 2004.

== Command structure ==
Commander Carrier Strike Group 2 (COMCARSTRKGRU 2 or CCSG 2) is responsible for unit-level training, integrated training, and material readiness for the group's ships and aviation squadrons. When not deployed, the strike group is part of the U.S. Fleet Forces Command, and its commander reports to Commander, U.S. SECOND Fleet. When deployed overseas, the group comes under command of the numbered fleet (Third, Fourth, Fifth, Sixth, or Seventh) in whose area it is operating, and will have a task force or task group designator, for example, Task Group 50 in the Fifth Fleet area.

Group commanders since 2004 have included:

• Rear Admiral (lower half) Thomas J. Kilcline, Jr.	named 16 June 2003, in post May 2004, nominated to be promoted to rear admiral.
• Rear Admiral James A. Winnefeld, Jr.	(July 2004 – June 2006)
• Rear Admiral Michael C. Vitale	(June 2006 – September 2007)
• Rear Admiral Frank Craig Pandolfe	(September 2007 – July 2009)
• Rear Admiral David M. Thomas	(July 2009 – July 2010)
• Captain Jeffrey A. Hesterman	(July 2010)
• Rear Admiral Nora W. Tyson	(July 2010 – January 2012)
• Rear Admiral Gregory M. Nosal	(January 2012 – March 2013)
• Rear Admiral John C. Aquilino	(March 2013 – February 2014)
• Rear Admiral DeWolfe H. Miller III	(February 2014 – August 2015)
• Rear Admiral Brian E. Luther	(August 2015 – November 2016)
• Rear Admiral Kenneth R. Whitesell	(November 2016 – October 2017)
• Rear Admiral Stephen C. Evans	(October 2017 – August 2019)
• Rear Admiral Sara A. Joyner	(August 2019 – April 2020)
• Rear Admiral Richard J. Cheeseman Jr.	(April 2020 – December 2020)
• Rear Admiral Scott Robertson	(December 2020 – June 2022)
• Rear Admiral Marc J. Miguez	(June 2022 – June 2024)
• Rear Admiral Kavon Hakimzadeh	(June 2024 – May 2025)
• Rear Admiral Frank Rhodes	(May 2025 – June 2026)
• Rear Admiral P. Scott Miller	(June 2026 – Present)

== Operational history ==
On 1 October 2004, Carrier Group 2 was re-designated as Carrier Strike Group 2. Theodore Roosevelt underwent sea trials 11–15 December 2004, and the carrier was officially delivered back to the Navy on 17 December 2004. Joint Task Force Exercise 05-2 (JTFEX 05-2, or Operation Brewing Storm 2005) was held between 14 and 22 July 2005. It included Carrier Strike Group 2, Carrier Strike Group Ten, the Spanish frigate Álvaro de Bazán, and the Peruvian submarine Antofagasta. The group received its Combat Operations Efficiency certification following the completion of its Composite Training Unit Exercise on 17 July 2005.

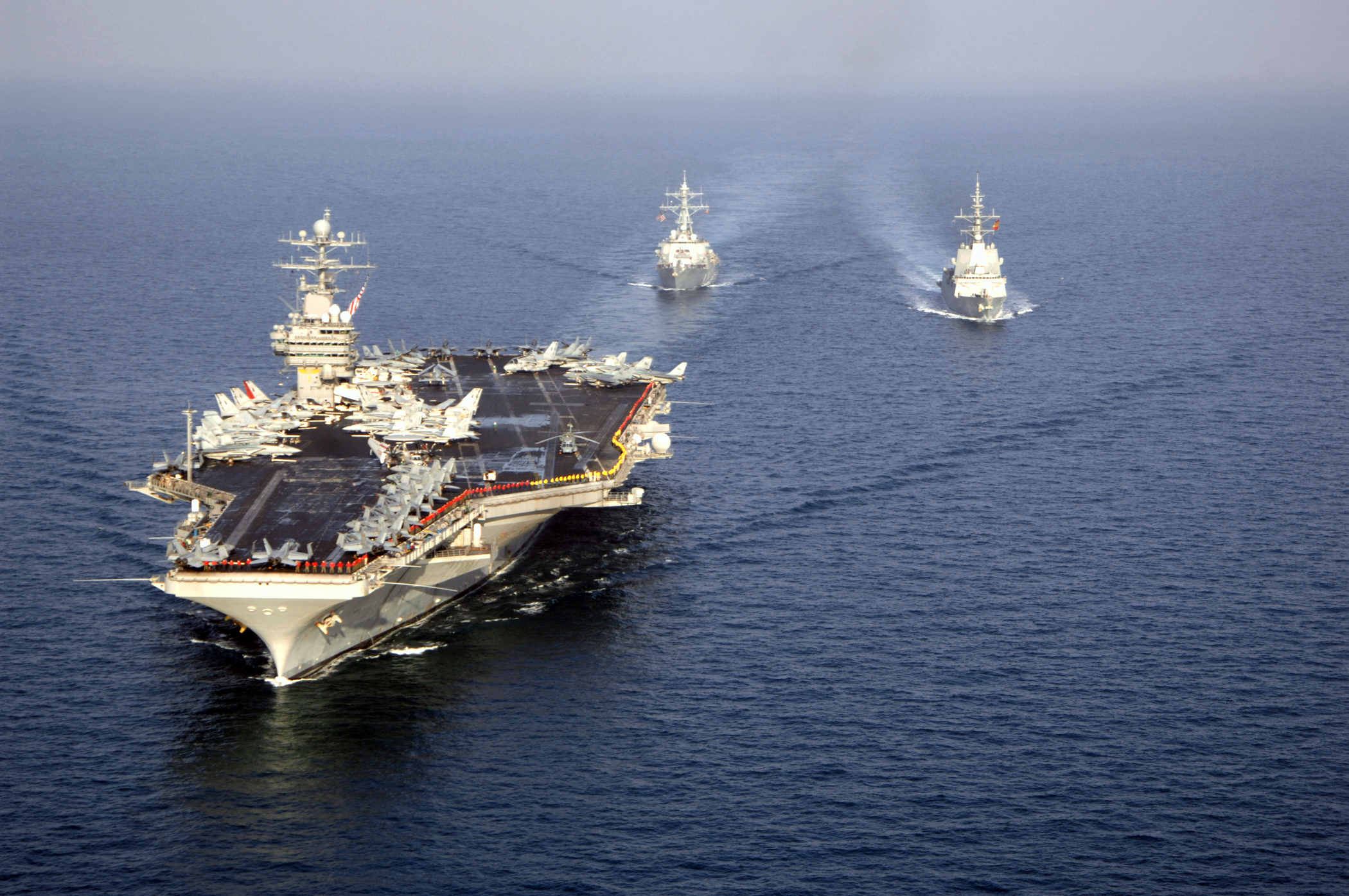
TR in the Persian Gulf (3 December 2005)

=== 2005–2006 deployment ===
The strike group departed from Norfolk on 1 September 2005 under the command of Rear Admiral James A. Winnefeld. On 6 October 2005, the group began air operations over Iraq, with fighter squadrons VF-213 and VF-31, along with the strike fighter squadrons VFA-87 and VFA-15, attacking insurgent targets. Electronic Attack Squadron 141 (VAQ-141) operated from Al Asad, Iraq, from 24 September to 6 October 2005, flying 37 combat sorties. VAW-124, VS-24, and HS-3 aircraft flew maritime security missions. Throughout the second week of November aircraft supported Operation Steel Curtain flying five consecutive days of close air support for troops in Iraq. The deployment was the final one for the F-14 Tomcat. It was also the final deployment of the Lockheed S-3 Viking ASW aircraft of squadron VS-24. The group transited the Suez Canal on 15 February 2006. It returned to Norfolk on 11 March 2006.

2005–2006 deployment force composition

Group Warships	Carrier Air Wing Eight (CVW-8) squadrons embarked aboard flagship USS Theodore Roosevelt (CVN-71)	
USS San Jacinto (CG-56)	Fighter Squadron 213 (VF-213): 10 F-14D	Sea Control Squadron 24 (VS-24): 8 S-3
USS Oscar Austin (DDG-79)	Fighter Squadron 31 (VF-31): 12 F-14D Tomcat	Helicopter Squadron 3 (HS-3): 2 HH-60H & 4 SH-60F
USS Donald Cook (DDG-75)	Strike Fighter Squadron 87 (VFA-87): 10 F/A-18C(N)	Fleet Logistics Support Squadron 40 (VRC-40), Det. 1: 2 C-2A
SPS Álvaro de Bazán (F101)	Strike Fighter Squadron 15 (VFA-15): 12 F/A-18C(N) Hornet	——
USNS Mount Baker (T-AE-34)	Electronic Attack Squadron 141 (VAQ-141): 4 EA-6B	——
USNS Kanawha (T-AO-196)	Carrier Airborne Early Warning (VAW-124): 4 E-2C 2000 NP	——

2005–2006 deployment exercises and port visits

Number	Regional Exercises				Port Visits		Notes
Number	Duration	U.S. Force	Bilateral/Multilateral Partner(s)	Operating Area	Location	Dates	Notes
1st:	——	Carrier Strike Group 2	——	——	Palma de Mallorca, Spain	13–17 Sep 2005	
2nd:	——	Carrier Strike Group 2	——	——	Naples, Italy	19–23 Sep 2005	
3rd:	——	Carrier Strike Group 2	——	——	Jebel Ali, UAE	28 December 2005	
4th:	——	Carrier Strike Group 2	——	——	Jebel Ali, UAE	22 January 2006	
5th:	——	Carrier Strike Group 2	——	——	Souda Bay, Crete	22 February 2006	

=== Operation Bold Step 2006 ===
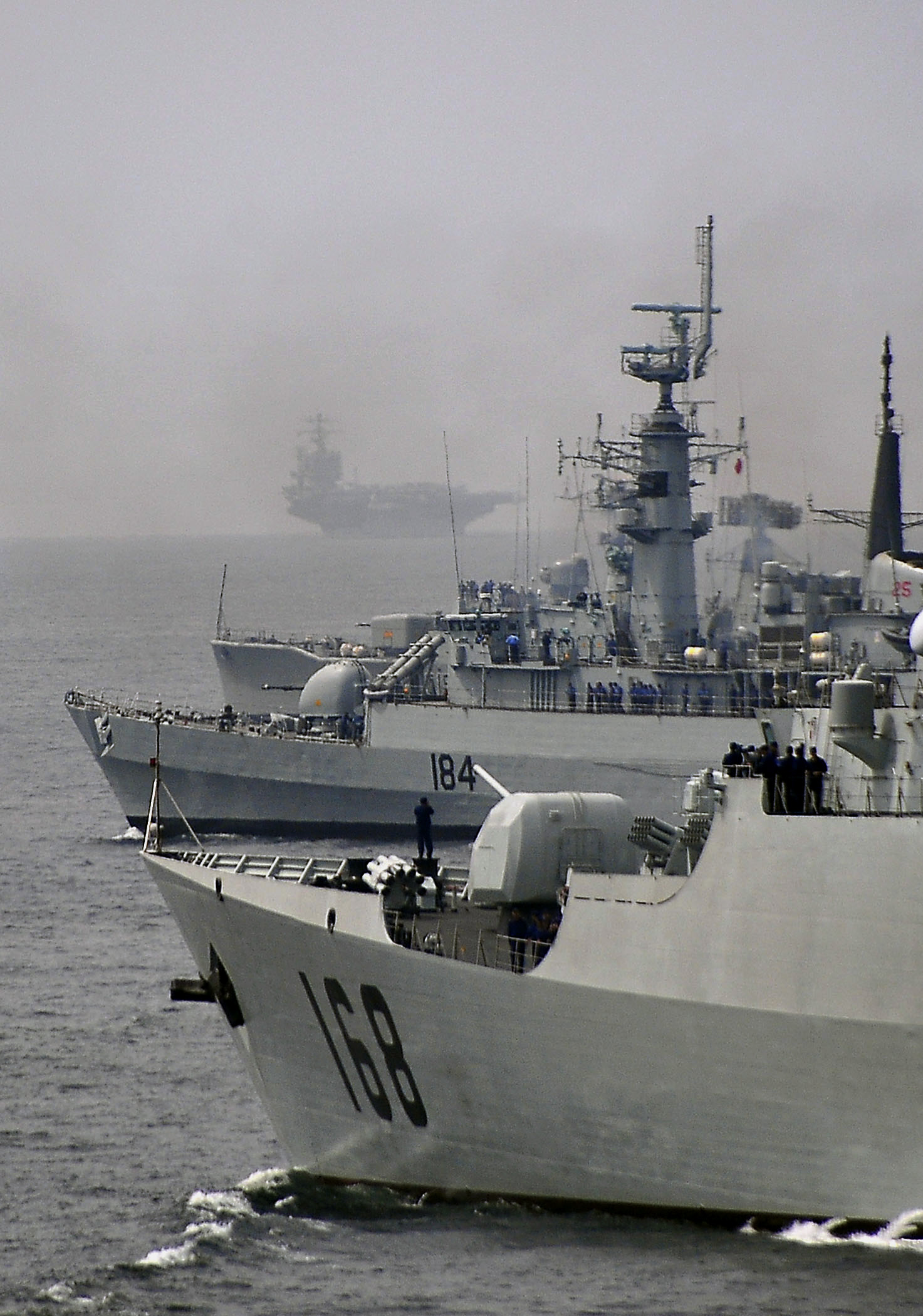
Aman 2009

Codenamed Operation Bold Step, Joint Task Force Exercise 06-2 (JTFEX 06-2) was held off the U.S. eastern coast between 21 and 31 July 2006 under the overall command of Vice Admiral Mark P. Fitzgerald, the commander of the U.S. Second Fleet. Carrier Strike Group 2, Carrier Strike Group 8, and the USS Bataan Expeditionary Strike Group were the major U.S. naval formations participating in Operation Bold Step which served as a major pre-deployment training exercise. Other allied naval units that participated in Operation Bold Step included the French nuclear-powered submarine Émeraude and the Colombian diesel-electric submarine Tayrona.

=== 2008–2009 deployment ===
On 8 September 2008, the strike group departed for a regularly scheduled deployment under the command of Rear Admiral Frank Craig Pandolfe. During its 2008 deployment, group aircraft flew more than 3,100 sorties into Afghanistan and dropped 59,500 pounds (27 t) of ordnance while providing vital close air support to coalition forces operating as part of the International Security Assistance Force (ISAF) in Afghanistan. On 9 October 2008, Theodore Roosevelt and the guided missile cruiser Monterey participated in a one-day theater security cooperation exercise with three South African warships and one French Navy warship in the Indian Ocean following a 3-day port visit to Cape Town, the first by a U.S. aircraft carrier since 1967.

Between 5 and 14 March 2009, Theodore Roosevelt, the cruiser Lake Champlain, and the Coast Guard cutter Boutwell participated in the international naval exercise Aman 2009 off the coast of Pakistan (pictured). The exercise was sponsored by the Pakistani Navy, and it included surface exercises, air-defense training, explosive ordnance disposal (EOD) exercises, and participation in foreign officer exchanges. Aman 2009 include participants from Australia, Bangladesh, China, France, Japan, Kuwait, Malaysia, Nigeria, Turkey, United States, and the United Kingdom. Forty-six observers from naval forces of 27 countries monitored the exercise.

2008–2009 deployment force composition

Group Warships	Carrier Air Wing Eight (CVW-8) squadrons embarked aboard flagship USS Theodore Roosevelt (CVN-71)	
USS Monterey (CG-61)	Strike Fighter Squadron 213 (VFA-213): 12 F/A-18F	Helicopter Squadron 3 (HS-3): 2 HH-60H & 4 SH-60F
USS Nitze (DDG-94)	Strike Fighter Squadron 87 (VFA-87): 10 F/A-18A+	Fleet Logistics Support Squadron 40 (VRC-40), Det. 1: 2 C-2A
USS Mason (DDG-87)	Strike Fighter Squadron 31 (VFA-31): 12 F/A-18E	——
USS The Sullivans (DDG-68)	Strike Fighter Squadron 15 (VFA-15): 10 F/A-18C(N)	——
USS Springfield (SSN-761)	Electronic Attack Squadron 141 (VAQ-141): 4 EA-6B	——
USNS Supply (T-AOE-6)	Carrier Airborne Early Warning (VAW-124): 4 E-2C	——

2008–2009 Deployment exercises and port visits

Number	Regional Exercises				Port Visits		Notes
Number	Duration	U.S. Force	Bilateral/Multilateral Partner(s)	Operating Area	Location	Dates	Notes
1st:	10 October 2008	Carrier Strike Group 2	South African Navy frigate SAS Isandlwana (F146), oiler SAS Drakensberg (A301), patrol boat SAS Isaac Dyobia (P1565), and the French Navy frigate Floreal (F730).	Indian Ocean	Cape Town, South Africa	4–7 Oct 2008	
2nd:	——	Carrier Strike Group 2	——	——	Jebel Ali, UAE	29 November 2008	
3rd:	——	Carrier Strike Group 2	——	——	Jebel Ali, UAE	29 January 2009	
4th:	5–14 Mar 2009	Theodore Roosevelt, Lake Champlain, Boutwell	Aman 2009	North Arabian Sea	Portsmouth, England	4 April 2009	

=== 2010 operations ===
In early 2010, more than 172 sailors from Carrier Strike Group Two took part in Operation Unified Response, the relief effort for earthquaked-ravaged Haiti. Rear Admiral David M. Thomas and his command staff managed the movement of U.S. food, water, medical supplies and relief personnel to Haiti from Naval Station Guantanamo Bay, Cuba, and ships operating off the coast. Thomas assumed command of Task Force 41, the U.S. Navy's sea-based element supporting Joint Task Force Haiti, on 1 February 2010, after Carl Vinson's Carrier Strike Group One departed the area. The group staff alternated between being embarked aboard the amphibious assault ship Bataan and living in tents outside of the U.S. Embassy in Port-au-Prince until late March. Most of the strike group staff returned to Naval Station Norfolk by 25 March 2010 after a 70-day tour of duty, with Rear Admiral Thomas returning on 1 April 2010.

=== 2011 deployment ===
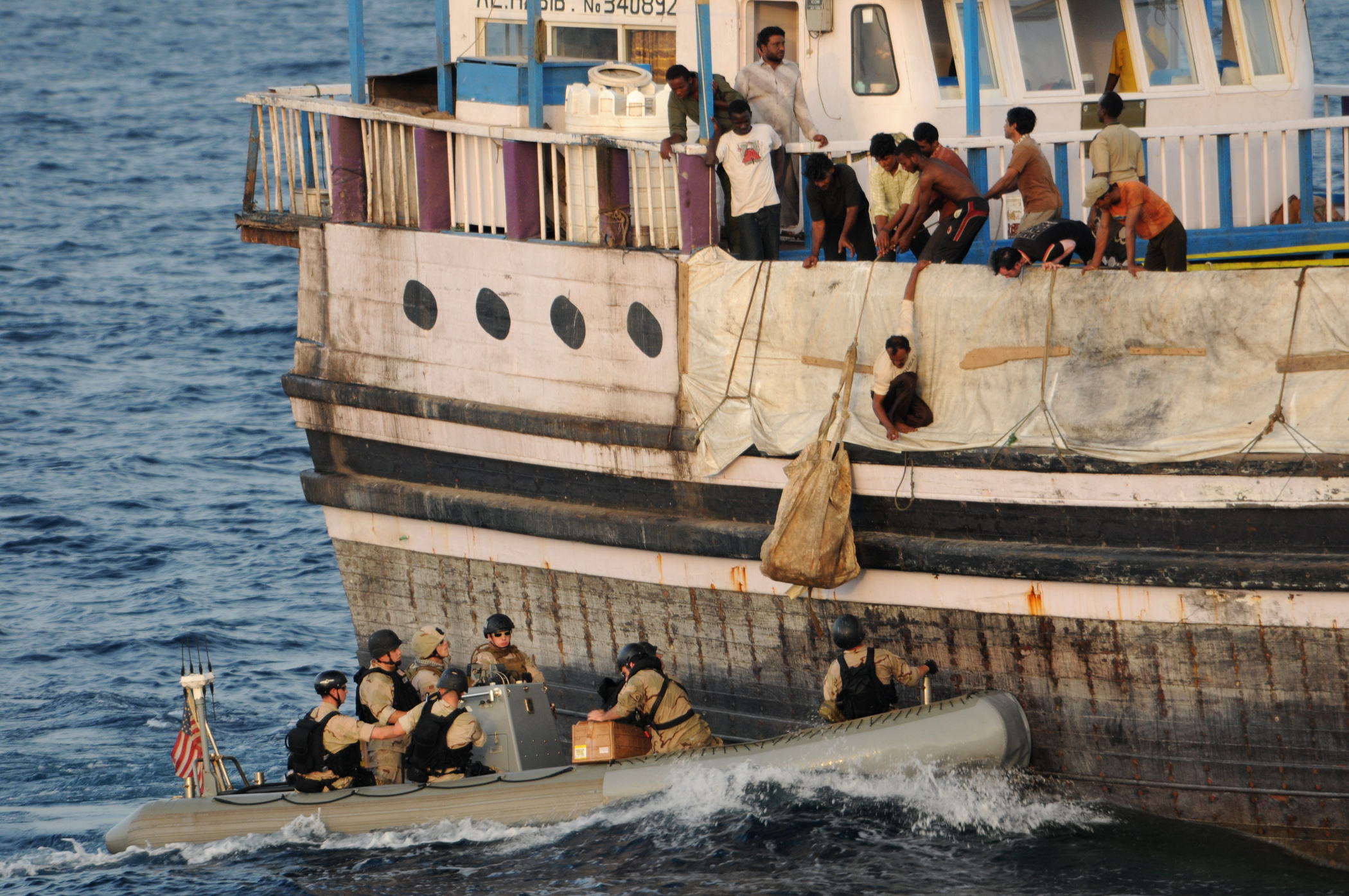
Gulf of Aden (13 August 2011)

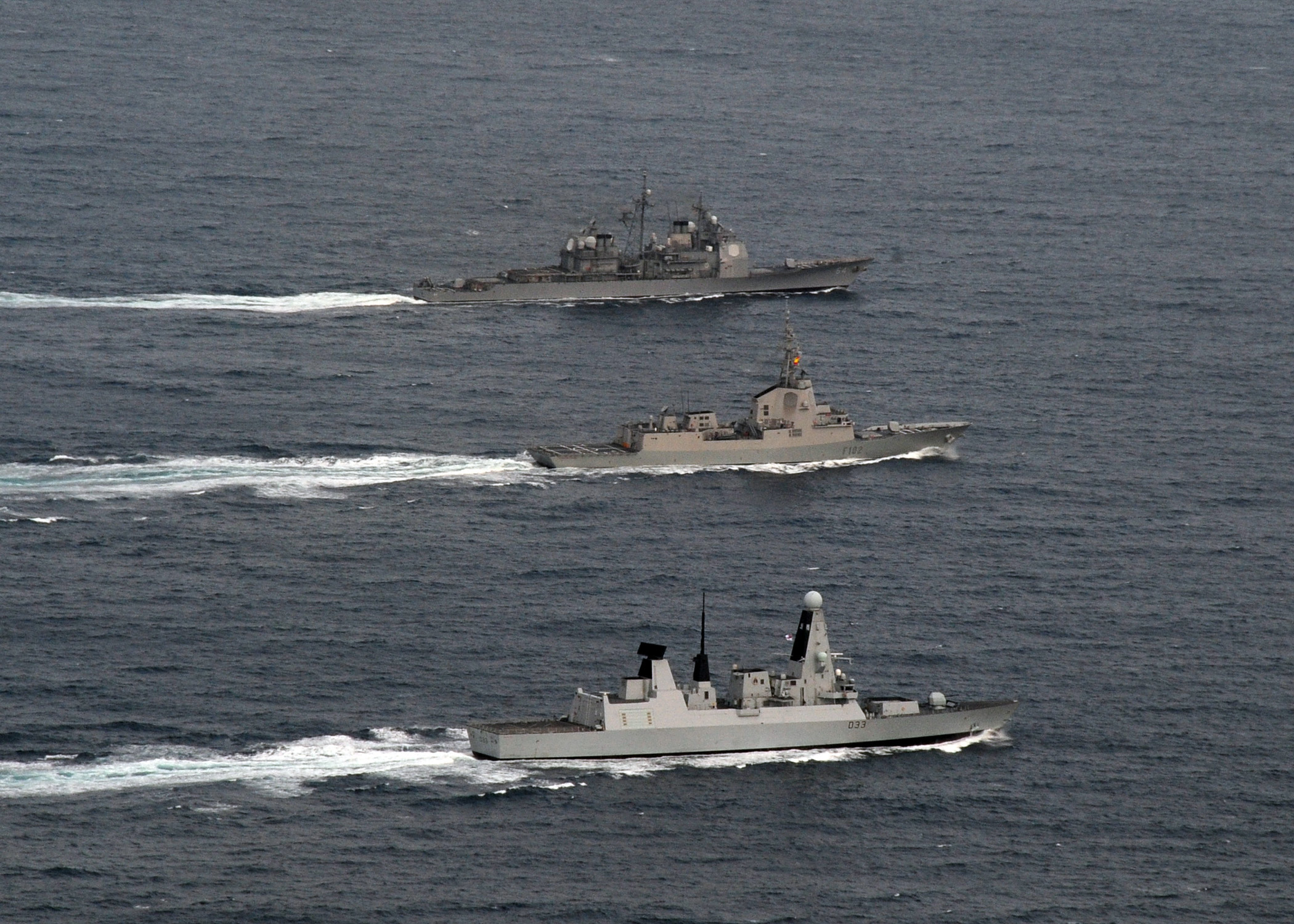
Saxon Warrior '11 (20 May 2011)

The group departed from Naval Station Mayport, Florida, for its Joint Task Force Exercise pre-deployment training exercise on 14 February 2011 prior to its deployment. The exercise was supported by personnel from Naval Striking and Support Forces NATO (STRIKFORNATO), with representatives from Canada, Denmark, Greece, Germany, France, Italy, the Netherlands, Spain, Turkey, the United Kingdom, and the United States. The exercise focused on increasing allied interoperability during major combat operations. STRIKFORNATO's interest in JTFEX training cycle dates back to 2008, and this is the first time that STRIKFORNATO had participated as a component commander in a carrier strike group certification.

During its 2011 deployment, the group's aircraft completed nearly 12,000 sorties, made over 9,000 arrested landings, and logged almost 31,000 flight hours. This included 2,216 combat sorties supporting U.S. forces in Iraq and Afghanistan. Over 20 tons of ordnance were delivered in support of coalition ground forces, consisting of laser-guided bombs, GPS munitions, and 20-mm ammunition. Carrier Air Wing Eight also participated in joint air operations with the Royal Jordanian Air Force and the Royal Saudi Air Force. After departing Djibouti on 1 July 2011, Anzio conducted counter-piracy and maritime security operations as a unit of Combined Task Force 151 before paying a goodwill visit to Victoria, Seychelles on 18 August 2011. On 13 August 2011, while with Combined Task Force 150 operating in the Gulf of Aden, the destroyer Mitscher provided assistance to the Sri Lankan cargo vessel Al Habib which was experiencing engineering problems and running low on water. Mitscher's boarding party transported supplies to the Al Habib via rigid-hulled inflatable boat (pictured).

Also during this deployment, the group participated in: Exercise Saxon Warrior '11, an eight-day NATO military exercise in the Western Approaches. Saxon Warrior '11 included naval forces from the United States, the United Kingdom, France, Germany, Sweden, Canada, and Spain under the overall direction of Flag Officer Sea Training. As part of Saxon Warrior '11, on 21 May 2011, the group's destroyers Truxtun and Mitscher joined the U.S. replenishment tanker Leroy Grumman and the Spanish frigate Almirante Juan de Borbón in conducting a transit exercise, with the British destroyer Gloucester and frigate Westminster acting as hostile forces during this exercise. Also, the guided-missile cruiser Gettysburg and the British destroyer Dauntless conducted joint air defense exercises (pictured).

On 8 December 2011, Gettysburg returned to Naval Station Mayport, Florida, and was greeted by Vice President Joe Biden. On 10 December 2011, George H.W. Bush, Anzio, Mitscher, Truxtun returned to Naval Station Norfolk, Virginia, completing the first overseas deployment for the Bush and Truxtun.

During 2011, the carrier George H.W. Bush and Carrier Air Wing Eight logged more than 250 days underway, 30,000 flight hours, and 14,000 sorties launched, which included 11,000 catapults shot, 15,000 aircraft recoveries, and no operational mishaps. The Bush also received the Battenberg Cup, Battle Effectiveness Award, and the Flatley Award for 2011.

2011 deployment force composition

Group Warships	Carrier Air Wing Eight (CVW-8) squadrons embarked aboard flagship USS George H.W. Bush (CVN-77)	
USS Anzio (CG-68)	Strike Fighter Squadron 213 (VFA-213): 12 F/A-18F	Carrier Airborne Early Warning Squadron 124 (VAW-124): 4 E-2C
USS Gettysburg (CG-64)	Strike Fighter Squadron 87 (VFA-87): 10 F/A-18A+	Helicopter Sea Combat Squadron Squadron 9 (HSC-9): 7 MH-60S
USS Truxtun (DDG-103)	Strike Fighter Squadron 31 (VFA-31): 12 F/A-18E	Helicopter Maritime Strike Squadron 70 (HMS-70): 11 MH-60R
USS Mitscher (DDG-57)	Strike Fighter Squadron 15 (VFA-15): 10 F/A-18C	Fleet Logistics Support Squadron 40 (VRC-40), Det.5: 2 C-2A
——	Tactical Electronics Warfare Squadron 141 (VAQ-141): 4–6 EA-18G	——

2011 deployment exercises and port visits

Number	Regional Exercises				Port Visits		Notes
Number	Duration	U.S. Force	Bilateral/Multilateral Partner(s)	Operating Area	Location	Dates	Notes
1st:	19–26 May 2011	Carrier Strike Group Two	Saxon Warrior '11: NATO	Western Approaches	Portsmouth, UK	27 May 2011	
2nd:	——	George H.W. Bush	Almirante Juan de Borbón	——	Cartagena, Spain	6–9 Jun 2011	
3rd:	——	Mitscher	——	——	Durrës, Albania	3–6 Jun 2011	
4th:	——	Gettysburg	——	——	Benidorm, Spain	6–9 Jun 2011	
5th:	——	Anzio	——	——	Odesa, Ukraine	3–6 Jun 2011	
6th:	6–18 Jun 2011	Anzio	Exercise Sea Breeze 2011	Black Sea	Batumi, Georgia	9–12 Jun 2011	
7th:	6–10 Jun 2011	Mitscher	Partnership of Adriatic Mariners (PAM)	Adriatic Sea	Bar, Montenegro	10–15 Jun 2011	
8th:	——	Truxtun	——	——	Limassol, Cyprus	10–13 Jun 2011	
9th	——	George H.W. Bush, Gettysburg	——	——	Naples, Italy	11–14 Jun 2011	
10th:	——	Truxtun	——	——	Haifa, Israel	15–16 Jun 2011	
11th:	——	Truxtun	——	——	Djibouti	26 June 2011	
12th:	——	Carrier Strike Group Two	——	——	Al Hidd, Bahrain	10–14 Jul 2011	
13th:	——	Truxtun	——	——	Manama, Bahrain	25 Jul – 13 August 2011	
14th:	1 Jul to 18 August 2011	Anzio	Combined Task Force 151	Gulf of Aden	Victoria, Seychelles	18 August 2011	
15th:	——	George H.W. Bush	——	——	Jebel Ali, UAE	31 Aug – 4 September 2011	
16th:	——	Gettysburg	——	——	Manama, Bahrain	31 Aug – 6 September 2011	
17th:	——	Anzio	——	——	Manama, Bahrain	29 September 2011	
18th:	——	Mitscher	——	——	Manama, Bahrain	29 Sep – 4 October 2011	
19th:	——	Truxtun	——	——	Manama, Bahrain	30 September 2011	
20th:	——	George H.W. Bush	——	——	Jebel Ali, UAE	31 October 2011	
21st:	3 November 2011	Mitscher	Pakistani Navy: Shah Jahan	Arabian Sea	Lisbon, Portugal	23 November 2011	
22nd:	——	Truxtun	——	——	Civitavecchia, Italy	23 November 2011	
23rd:	——	Anzio	——	——	Palma de Mallorca, Spain	24–27 Nov 2011	
24th:	——	George H.W. Bush	——	——	Marseille, France	25 November 2011	

=== 2012–2014 operations ===
On 25 July 2012, George H.W. Bush, began its four-month overhaul at Norfolk Naval Shipyard at Portsmouth, Virginia, which included scheduled short-term technical upgrades. Also undergoing maintenance during 2012 were the guided-missile destroyers Bainbridge, Mason, Bulkeley, Ross, and Barry, as well as the guided-missile frigate Kauffman.

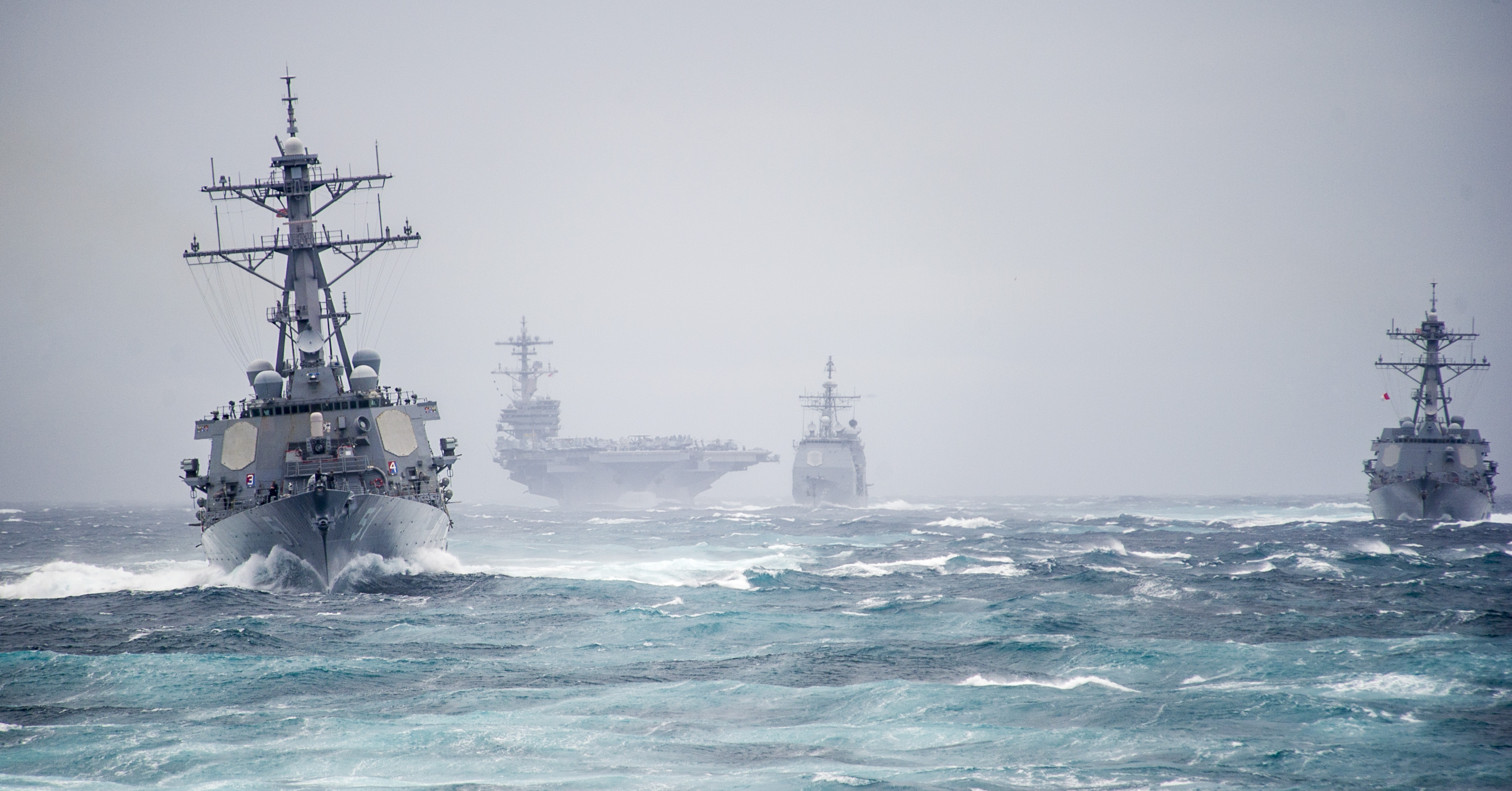
Carrier Strike Group Two underway (10 December 2013)

On 1 December 2012, the George H.W. Bush completed its maintenance cycle and began sea trials on 3 December 2012. After completing its sea trials on 4 December 2012, the Bush began its training and qualification cycle in preparation for the 2014 deployment of Carrier Strike Group Two. This included the on-loading of munitions in anticipation of the upcoming overseas deployment of Carrier Strike Group Two.

The pre-deployment training cycle for Carrier Strike Group Two began with the successful completion of its Tailored Ship's Training Availability/Final Evaluation Problem (TSTA/FEP) training exercises on 23 August 2013. TSTA integrated individual units of Carrier Strike Group Two into a single formation while FEP is a graded 48-hour training evolution that evaluated how effectively the strike group operated together. These exercises were the first time that the George H.W. Bush and Carrier Air Wing Eight had operated together since 2011. On 20 November 2013, Carrier Strike Group Two began its 29-day Composite Training Unit Exercise (COMPTUEX). This series of training exercises were designed to certify the carrier strike group's deployment readiness by testing its capability to react to real-world scenarios as an integrated naval combat formation. This included CVW-8 aircraft flying live bombing runs at the U.S. Navy's Pinecastle Bombing Range in Ocala National Forest, Florida, between 18 and 18 December 2013.

At the start of 2014, Carrier Strike Group Two was in port and not underway.

2012–2013 exercises and port visits

Number	Exercises/Operations				Port Visits		Notes
Number	Duration	U.S. Force	Joint/Bilateral/Multilateral Partner(s)	Operating Area	Location	Dates	Notes
1st:	1 Jun to 1 December 2012	Carr (Note: Detachment 2 of Helicopter Maritime Strike Squadron 46 (HSL-48) embarked.)	Joint Interagency Task Force South	U.S. Fourth Fleet	Various	Various	
2nd:	20–28 Sep 2012	Anzio, Gravely	UNITAS Atlantic 53-2012 (Note: Other warships included HMS Dauntless, BNS Greenhalgh, ARC Antioquia, ARM Independencia, and HMCS Preserver.)	Caribbean Sea	NAS Key West, Florida	16–20 Sep 2012	
3rd:	1–11 Oct 2012	Gettysburg, Mitscher	Joint Warrior 12-2 (Note: Joint Warrior 12-2 involved ground-air-sea forces from the United Kingdom, France, Canada, the Netherlands, Belgium, Estonia, Norway, Sweden, and the United States.)	Western Approaches	Portsmouth, U.K.	13–18 Oct 2012	
4th:	7 January 2013	George H.W. Bush	Munitions on-loading: William McLean	Atlantic Ocean	——	——	
5th:	30 Jul to 30 August 2013	Carrier Strike Group Two	Group Sail: TSTA/FEP (Note: Tailored Ship's Training Availability (TSTA) and Final Evaluation Problem (FEP) with George H.W. Bush, USS Truxtun (DDG-103), USS Roosevelt (DDG-80), USS Philippine Sea (CG-58), and USS Leyte Gulf (CG-55))	Atlantic Ocean	——	——	
8th:	20 Nov to 18 December 2013	Carrier Strike Group Two	COMPTUEX: Strike Force Training Atlantic (CSFTL)	Atlantic Ocean	——	——	

=== 2014 deployment ===
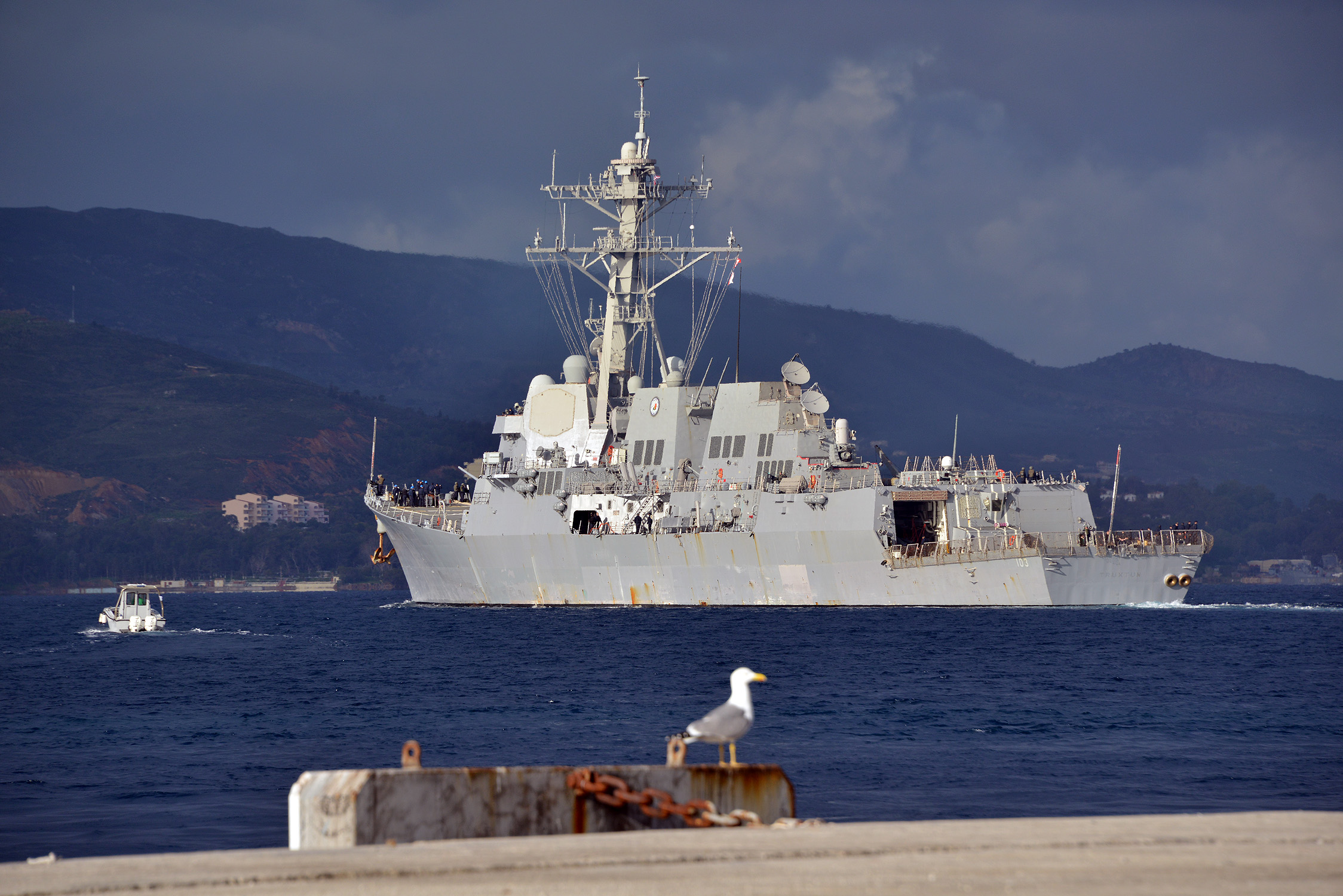
Souda Bay (6 March 2014)

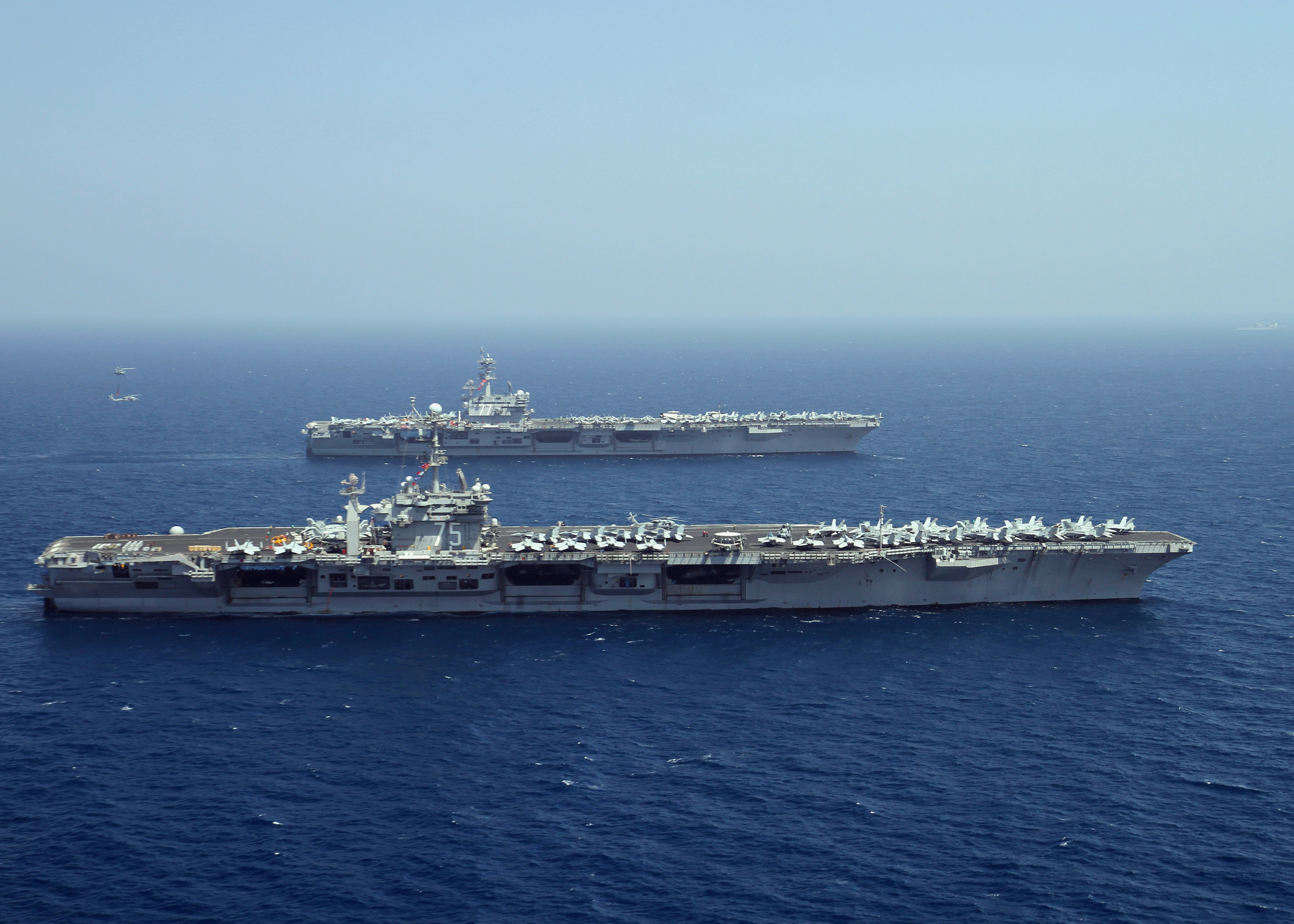
Gulf of Aden (6 March 2014)

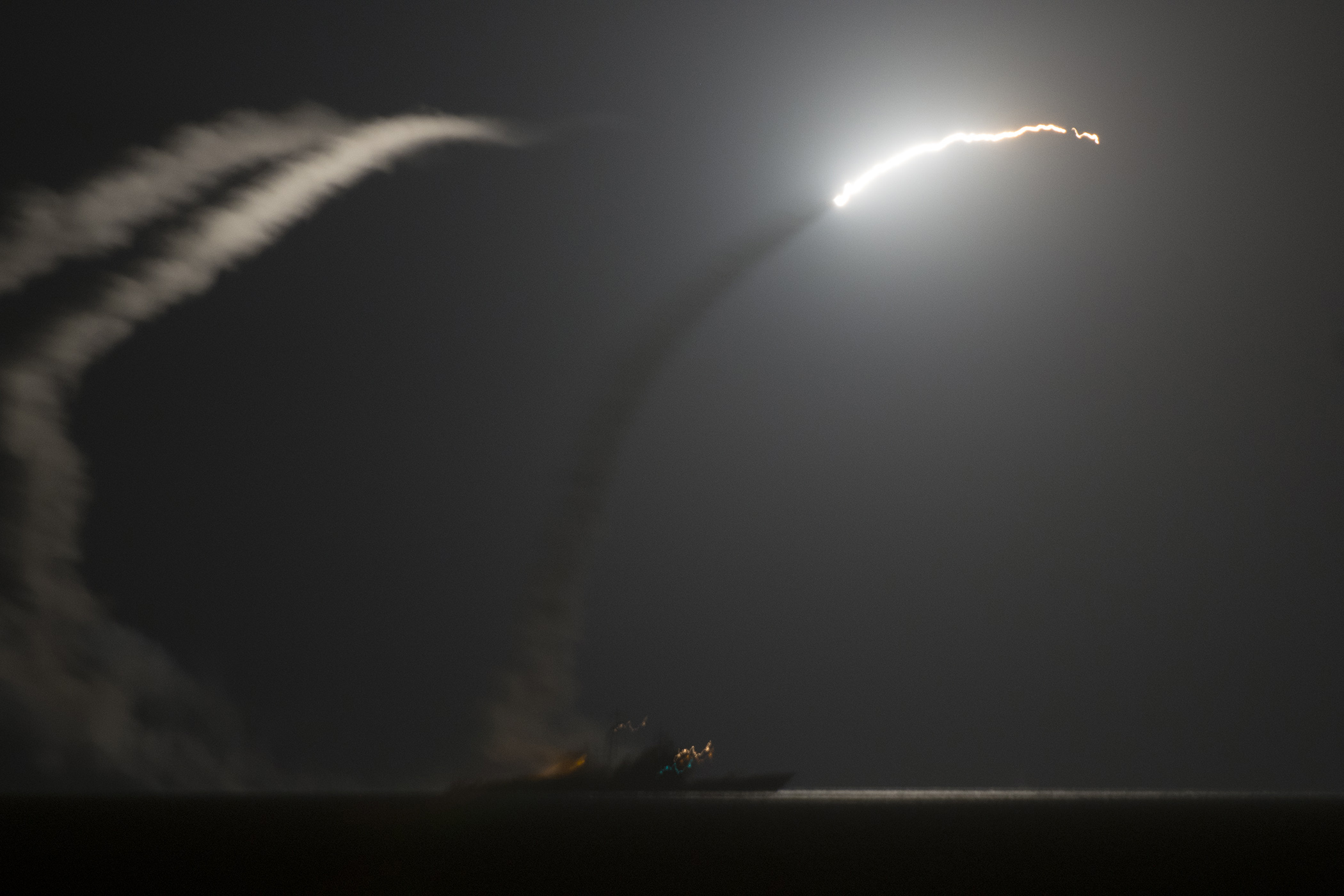
USS Philippine Sea (23 September 2014)

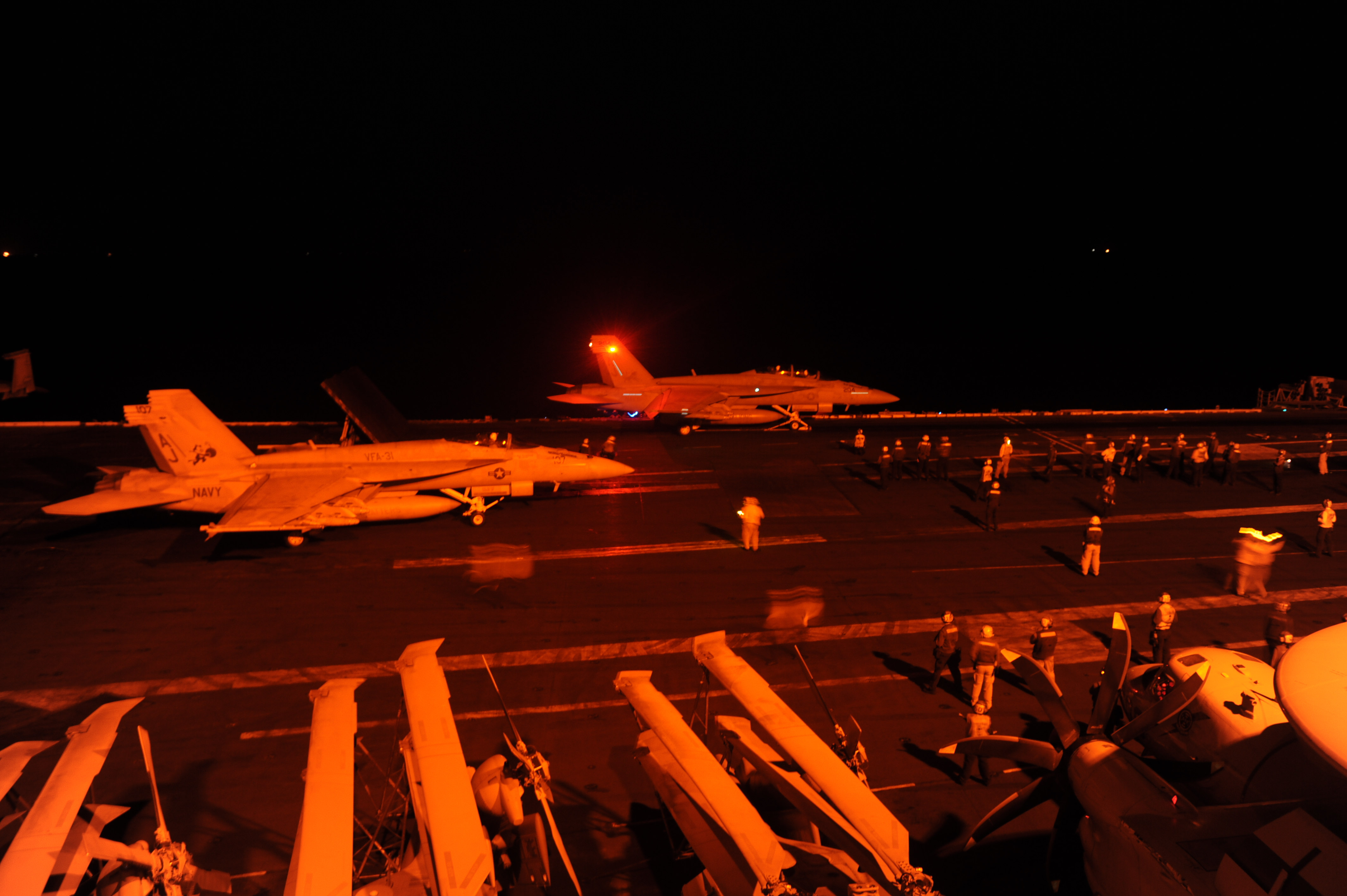
USS George HW Bush (23 September 2014)

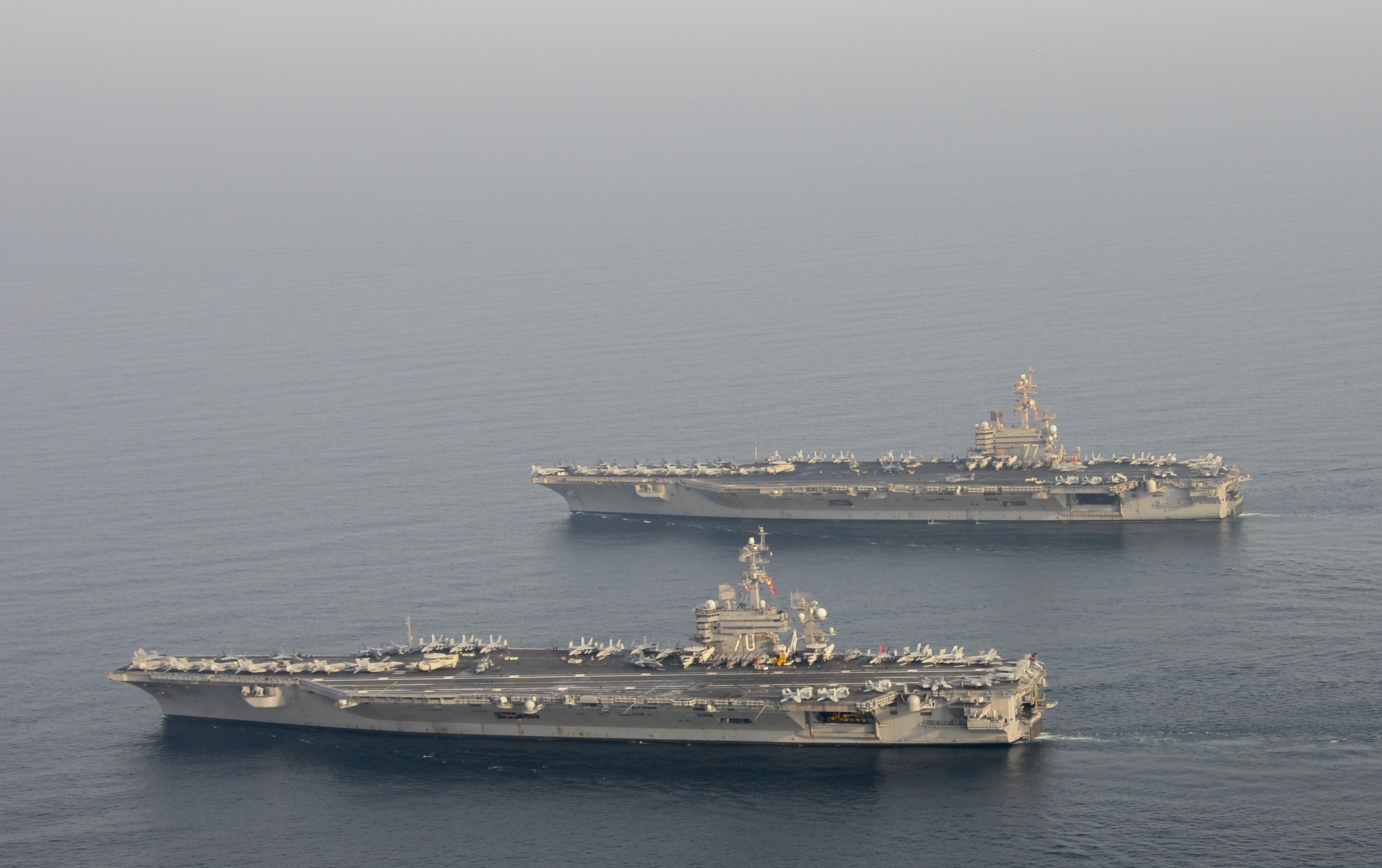
Task Force 50 (18 October 2014)

On 15 February 2014, Carrier Strike Group Two began its 2014 Mediterranean and Indian Ocean deployment. The carrier George H.W. Bush and the destroyer Truxtun departed Naval Station Norfolk, Virginia, to rendezvous with the cruiser Philippine Sea and destroyer Roosevelt that departed Naval Station Mayport, Florida, on 15 February 2014. Also on that date, the destroyer Arleigh Burke departed Norfolk for an independent eight-month Ballistic Missile Defense deployment with the U.S. Fifth Fleet.

On 17 February 2014, Rear Admiral DeWolfe H. Miller, III relieved Rear Admiral John C. Aquilino as Commander, Carrier Strike Group Two. A naval aviator, Miller had previously commanded the carrier George H.W. Bush while Aquilino's next assignment was operations director of the U.S. Pacific Fleet.

==== U.S. Sixth Fleet ====
On 24 February 2014, Carrier Strike Group Two entered the U.S. Sixth Fleet's area of responsibility. On 27 February 2014, the group transited the Straits of Gibraltar and entered the Mediterranean Sea. During its transit across the Mediterranean, the strike group encountered and monitored a Russian naval task group led by the aircraft carrier Kuznetsov. Carrier Strike Group Two entered the Suez Canal on 18 March 2014, exiting the Mediterranean Sea.

Russian annexation of Crimea

With the annexation of Crimea unfolding, on 6 March 2014, the guided-missile destroyer Truxtun (pictured) departed Souda Bay, Greece, for operations in the Black Sea with units of the Romanian and Bulgarian navies. The official U.S. Navy news release noted that "Truxtun's operations in the Black Sea were scheduled well in advance of her departure from the United States." The U.S. Department of Defense also announced that Carrier Strike Group Two's deployment to the U.S. Fifth Fleet would be temporarily delayed, and the carrier group held in the Mediterranean Sea because of the ongoing crisis in the Crimea.

Morning Glory Incident

In the early morning hours of 17 March 2014, a team of United States Navy SEALs team operating from the USS Roosevelt successfully retook the hijacked North Korean-flagged oil tanker Morning Glory from Libyan terrorists while steaming in international waters off the southeast coast of Cyprus. The Morning Glory had been seized "earlier in the month" by an armed group in the Libyan port of As-Sidra. The hijackers unsuccessfully attempted to sell the ship's oil cargo illegally on the black market, with the earnings going to their separatist group and not the Libyan interim central government's National Oil Corporation.

==== U.S. Fifth Fleet ====
On 19 March 2014, Carrier Strike Group Two transited the Suez Canal and joined the U.S. Fifth Fleet. The destroyer Truxtun rejoined the carrier group after departing the Black Sea on 21 March 2014. On 22 March 2014, Carrier Strike Group Two relieved Carrier Strike Group Ten in the Gulf of Aden (pictured). Operating in the North Arabian Sea, Carrier Air Wing Eight launched its first combat sorties in support of coalition forces in Afghanistan on 26 March 2014. In addition to close air mission in support of coalition ground forces, Carrier Strike Group Two launched air mission in conjunction with the Afghan run-off elections.

On 18 October 2014, Carrier Strike Group One relieved Carrier Strike Group Two in the Persian Gulf (pictured). As of that date, Carrier Strike Group Two and its embarked Carrier Air Wing Eight had amassed 32,611 flight hours, 12,548 total sorties, and 9,752 arrested landings on board the carrier George H.W. Bush. This included 3,245 combat sorties in support Operation Inherent Resolve (see below) in Iraq and Syria, as well as coalition ground forces in Afghanistan, with 18,333 combat flight hours flown and more than 120,000 lb (54,000 kg) of ordnance expended. Carrier Strike Group Two depart the U.S. Fifth Fleet on 27 October 2014, concluding a seven-month-long deployment.

Iraqi-Syrian Crises

With the ISIL military invasion of Iraq intensifying, Carrier Strike Group Two entered the Persian Gulf on 14 June 2014. Joining the carrier George HW Bush, the cruiser Philippine Sea, and the destroyer Truxtun were the destroyers Arleigh Burke and O'Kane which had been operating in the Persian Gulf. CVW-8 aircraft began flying combat air patrols over Iraq on 19 June 2014.

On 8 August 2014, Carrier Strike Group Two conducted air-strikes directed to stop the advancement of ISIS forces into Erbil. These air strikes marked the return of U.S. air combat forces to Iraq since the end of the U.S. military operations in 2011. By 20 August 2014, the strike group had launched 30 airstrikes against ISIS targets although the majority of the sorties have been devoted to surveillance missions.

Beginning 22 September 2014, a multi-lateral air campaign attacked ISIL military positions in Syria. The targets included training compounds, headquarters and command and control facilities, storage facilities, a finance center, as well as supply trucks and armed vehicles. Prior to the launch of the air campaign, a total of 47 land-attack Tomahawk cruise missiles were fired against ISIL military targets from the destroyer Arleigh Burke and the cruiser Philippine Sea (pictured) operating from international waters in the Red Sea and Persian Gulf. These missile strikes also included Khorasan Group targets located west of Aleppo. Finally, F/A-18 Hornets and EA-6B Prowlers (pictured) from Carrier Air Wing 8 executed the majority of the third wave of airstrikes against ISIL positions in Raqqa, Dayr az Zawr, Abu Kamal, and Al Hasakah.

On 6 October 2014, the anti-ISIL air campaign entered its ninth week of operation in Iraq and its fourth week in Syria. As of that date, units of Carrier Strike Group Two contributed 20 percent of the total munitions used at an overall cost of $62 million (USD). Effective 15 October 2014, the United States Central Command officially designated the U.S.-led air campaign against ISIL in Iraq and Syria as Operation Inherent Resolve. Carrier Strike Group Two concluded its final offensive operations against ISIL on 18 October 2014.

==== Homecoming and key accomplishments ====
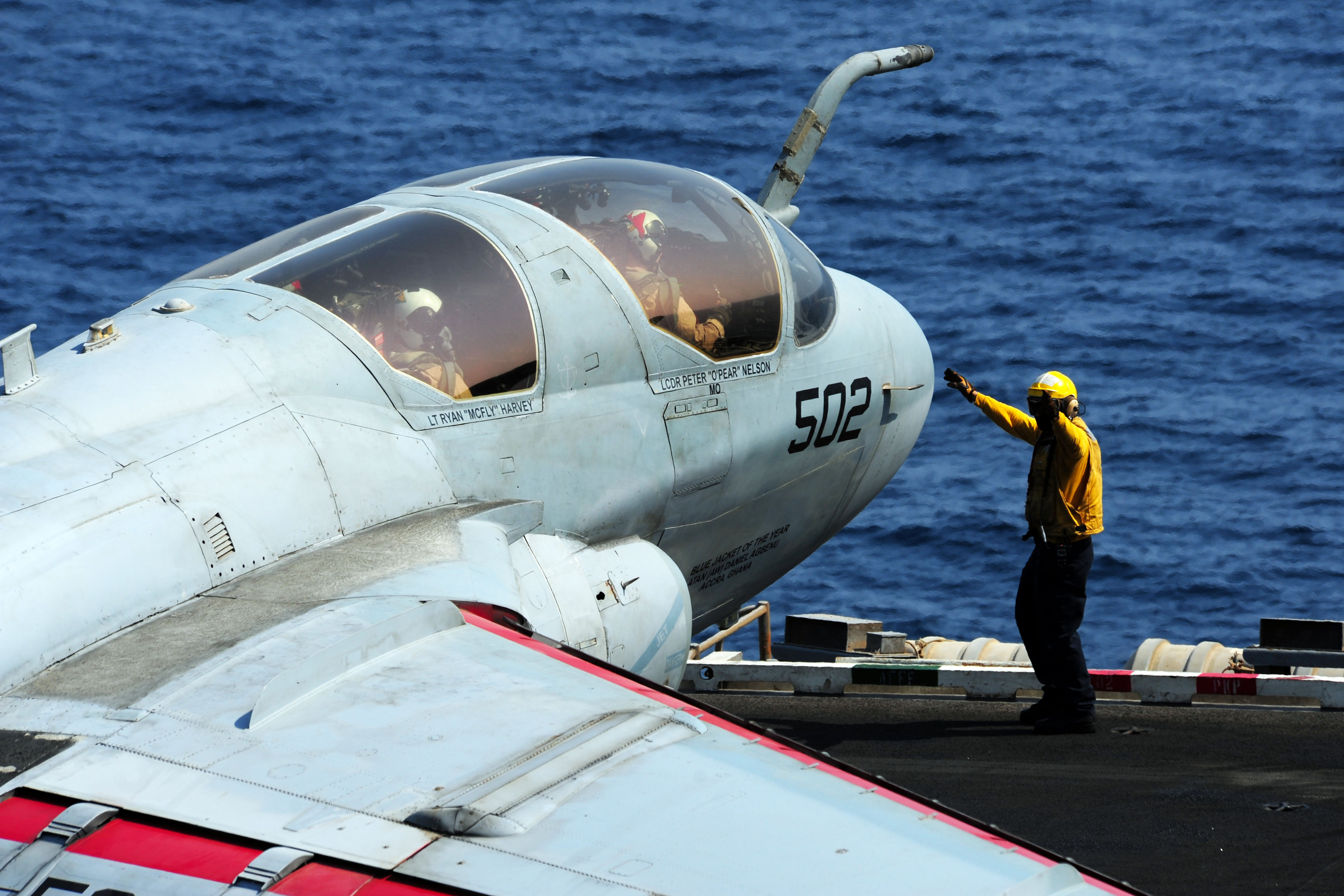
VAQ-134 EA-6B Prowler (26 August 2014)

Carrier Strike Group Two transited the Suez Canal on 27 October 2014. Following port visits, the strike group transited the Strait of Gibraltar on 6 November 2014. Carrier Strike Group Two concluded its nine-month-long deployment when it arrived in Norfolk, Virginia, on 15 November 2014. The strike group was preceded by the return of the destroyer Arleigh Burke from its eight-month-long independent deployment to the U.S. Fifth Fleet on 17 October 2014.

During its 2014 deployment, the strike group's aviation units flew 12,774 sorties for a total of 34,831 flight hours. This included 3,245 combat sorties with 18,333 combat flight hours flown. Aircraft delivered 232 precision guided bombs and fired more than 2,400 rounds of 20mm ammunition. The aircraft also made 10,003 catapult launches and arrested landings (traps).

Surface units of Carrier Strike Group Two were also active during this 2014 deployment. The destroyer Truxtun operated with the Romanian and Bulgarian navies while showing the flag in the Black Sea amid the ongoing annexation of Crimea by the Russian Federation. The destroyer Roosevelt served as the mother ship for the re-capture of the hijacked oil tanker Morning Glory from Libyan terrorists. Also, destroyer Arleigh Burke and the cruiser Philippine Sea launched 47 Tomahawk land attack cruise missiles against Syrian targets in support of Operation Inherent Resolve.

Finally, naval aviation history reached a milestone when the Northrop Grumman EA-6B Prowler (pictured) made its final overseas deployment with Carrier Strike Group Two, retiring after 42 years of operations with the United States Navy.

==== Forces, operations, and port visits ====
2014 deployment force composition

Group Warships	Carrier Air Wing Eight (CVW-8) squadrons embarked aboard flagship USS George H.W. Bush (CVN-77)	
USS Philippine Sea (CG-58)	Strike Fighter Squadron 213 (VFA-213): 12 F/A-18F	Carrier Airborne Early Warning Squadron 124 (VAW-124): 4 E-2C
USS Truxtun (DDG-103)	Strike Fighter Squadron 87 (VFA-87): 10 F/A-18C	Helicopter Sea Combat Squadron Squadron 9 (HSC-9): 8 MH-60S
USS Roosevelt (DDG-80)	Strike Fighter Squadron 31 (VFA-31): 12 F/A-18E	Helicopter Maritime Strike Squadron 70 (HMS-70): 11 MH-60R
USS Arleigh Burke (DDG-51)	Strike Fighter Squadron 15 (VFA-15): 10 F/A-18C	Fleet Logistics Support Squadron 40 (VRC-40), Det. 2: 2 C-2A
——	Tactical Electronics Warfare Squadron 134 (VAQ-134): 5 EA-6B	——

2014 deployment operations, exercises, and port visits

Number	Exercises/Operations				Port Visits		Notes
Number	Duration	U.S. Forces	Joint/Bilateral/Multilateral Partner(s)	Operating Area	Location	Dates	Notes
1st	——	Arleigh Burke	——	——	Marseille, France	2–14 Mar 2014	
2nd:	——	Truxtun	——	——	Souda Bay, Greece	3–6 Mar 2014	
3rd:	——	Bush, Philippine Sea	——	——	Piraeus, Greece	4–7 Mar 2014	
4th:	——	Roosevelt	——	——	Koper, Slovenia	4–7 Mar 2014	
5th:	12 March 2014	Truxtun	PASSEX: Romanian Naval Forces & Bulgarian Navy (Note: BGS Drazki (F 41), ROS Regina Maria (F222), ROS Admiral Petre Barbuneanu (F260), and ROS Contraamiral Eustatiu Sebastian (F264))	Black Sea	Constanta, Romania	8–12 Mar 2014	
6th:	17 March 2014	Roosevelt	U.S. Navy SEALs	Mediterranean Sea	Split, Croatia	8–11 Mar 2014	
7th:	13 March 2014	Bush, Philippine Sea	PASSEX: FS Cassard (D614)	Mediterranean Sea	Antalya, Turkey	9–12 Mar 2014	
8th:	——	Truxtun	——	——	Varna, Bulgaria	13–16 Mar 2014	
9th:	29 March 2014	Bush, Philippine Sea	Air Defense Exercise (ADEX) (Note: Spanish frigate Cristóbal Colón (F105) and Italian destroyer Francesco Mimbelli (D561))	North Arabian Sea	Hidd, Bahrain	22–28 Apr 2014	
10th:	30 Mar to 18 October 2014	Carrier Strike Group 2	Operation Enduring Freedom – Afghanistan: ISAF	Persian Gulf, Arabian Sea	——	——	
11th:	——	Arleigh Burke	——	——	Hidd, Bahrain	(Note: 29 March; 10–16 May May; 30 May – 6 June; 9–13 July; 8–30 August.)	
12th:	——	Roosevelt	——	——	Hidd, Bahrain	(Note: 2 April 2014, 2–6 May 2014; 31 June to 6 July; 4 September.)	
13th:	——	Truxtun	——	——	Aqaba, Jordan	(Note: 19–23 April; 19–23 August)	
14th:	——	Arleigh Burke	——	——	Abu Dhabi, U.A.E.	26–31 Apr 2014	
15th:	May 2014	Truxtun	Exercise Eager Lion 2014	Persian Gulf	Muscat, Oman	9–12 May 2014	
16th:	——	Bush, Philippine Sea	——	——	Abu Dhabi, U.A.E.	24–28 May 2014	
17th:	24 May 2014	Truxtun	Exercise Khunjar Haad	Red Sea	Hidd, Bahrain	30 May – 7 June 2014	
18th:	24 May 2014	Truxtun	——	——	Limassol, Cyprus	30 – 2 Jul 2014	
19th:	1 August 2014	Truxtun	Suez Canal operations: USS Annapolis (SSN-760)	Red Sea	Aqaba, Jordan	19–23 Aug 2014	
20th:	8 Aug to 18 October 2014	Carrier Strike Group 2	Combat air strike operations: Northern Iraq	Persian Gulf	Jebel Ali, U.A.E.	2–6 Aug 2014	
21st:	(Note: Transited Strait of Gibraltar on 6 October 2014.)	Arleigh Burke	Independent operations	Mediterranean Sea	various	(Note: Civitavecchia, Italy – 29 September to 3 October 2014; Ponta Delgada, Azores, 9 October 2014.)	
22nd:	23 Sep to 18 October 2014	Carrier Strike Group 2	Combat air strike operations: Syria	Persian Gulf, Red Sea	Hidd, Bahrain	5 October 2014	
23rd:	(Note: Departed Persian Gulf on 22 September 2014.)	Roosevelt	U.S. Fifth Fleet	Persian Gulf	Duqm, Oman	1–5 Oct 2014	
24th:	——	Bush, Philippine Sea	——	——	Manama, Bahrain	9 October 2014	
25th:	——	Truxtun	——	——	Abu Dhabi, U.A.E.	9–13 Oct 2014	
26th:	——	George H.W. Bush	——	——	Duqm, Oman	21 October 2014	
27th:	——	Roosevelt	——	——	Souda Bay, Crete	21–28 Oct 2014	
28th:	——	George H.W. Bush	——	——	Marseille, France	1–4 Nov 2014	
29th:	——	Philippine Sea	——	——	Barcelona, Spain	1–5 Nov 2014	
30th:	——	Truxtun	——	——	Villefranche, France	1–4 Nov 2014	
31st:	——	Roosevelt	——	——	Lisbon, Portugal	3–6 Nov 2014	

=== 2015 operations ===
On 31 January 2015, The George H.W. Bush departed Naval Station Norfolk, Virginia, for a six-day underway to conduct Carrier Qualifications with the Carrier Air Wing Eight and off-loaded ammunition offload with the USS Theodore Roosevelt (CVN-71), returning to Norfolk on 6 February 2015. Between 10 and 18 February, the Bush was underway for Fleet Replacement Squadron carrier qualifications.

On 1 April 2015, the Bush departed Norfolk for a 10-day underway for carrier qualification (CQ) operations for members of the Carrier Strike Group Ten and Carrier Air Wing Seven in the Atlantic Ocean, returning on 11 April 2015. During a subsequent underway period, between 24 and 25 April 2015, the Bush off-loaded its ammunition to the dry cargo ship USNS William McLean (T-AKE-12) in preparation for the carrier's planned incremental availability (PIA) refit. The Bush conducted a final carrier qualification operation between 6 and 9 May 2015.

On 16 June 2015, the carrier George H.W. Bush moored at Super Pier 5 at Norfolk Naval Shipyard in Portsmouth, Virginia, to begin a six-month Planned Incremental Availability (PIA) refit and upkeep period. The cruiser Philippine Sea and the destroyers Truxtun and Roosevelt are also scheduled to undergo maintenance and refit during 2015.

=== 2017 operations ===
In July/August 2017, after operations against Daesh/ISIS, it took part in Exercise Saxon Warrior 17, with command and control temporarily passed to the Royal Navy's Commander UK Carrier Strike Group (COMUKCSG) staff. This allowed COMUKCSG to prepare for future Royal Navy carrier operations.

=== 2023-present operations ===
Since 2023, the Strike Group has participated in Operation Prosperity Guardian in the Red Sea in an effort to protect shipping from Iran-backed Houthis in Yemen.

On December 31, 2023, Iranian-backed Houthi fighters attacked a Singapore-flagged commercial container ship in the Red Sea, and attempted to board it. U.S. Navy helicopters from the U.S.S. Eisenhower carrier group responded to the ship's distress call and arrived to chase the attackers away, and the Houthis opened fire on the helicopters. The helicopters responded in self-defense, sunk three Houthi fast boats, and killed all the crew members on the boats. The New York Times reported that: "It appeared to be the first time that American and allied forces patrolling the Red Sea ... have engaged in a deadly firefight with the Houthis since their attacks on ships began in October...."

== See also ==
- History of the United States Navy
- List of United States Navy aircraft squadrons

== Notes ==
Footnotes

Citations

== Sources ==
- Morison, Samuel Loring (September 2014). "U.S. Battle Force Aviation Changes 2013–14". Naval Institute Proceedings. 140 (4): 48–50. ISSN 0041-798X. "Registration required."
- —— (May 2009). "U.S. Naval Battle Force Changes 1 January 2008–31 December 2008: Aircraft Carrier Air Wing Assignments and Composition as of 17 Feb 2009". Naval Institute Proceedings. 135 (5): 118–120. ISSN 0041-798X. "Registration required."
- —— (May 2010). "U.S. Naval Battle Force Changes 1 January 2009–31 December 2009: Aircraft Carrier Air Wing Assignments and Composition as of 1 March 2010". Naval Institute Proceedings. 136 (5): 106–116. ISSN 0041-798X. "Registration required."
- —— (May 2011). "U.S. Naval Battle Force Changes 1 January 2010–31 December 2010: Aircraft Carrier Air Wing Assignments and Composition as of 1 March 2011". Naval Institute Proceedings. 137 (5): 117–120. ISSN 0041-798X. "Registration required."
- —— (May 2012). "U.S. Naval Battle Force Changes 1 January 2011–31 December 2011: Aircraft Carrier Air Wing Assignments and Composition as of 2 April 2012". Naval Institute Proceedings. 138 (5): 112. ISSN 0041-798X. "Registration required."
