= Stephen C. Evans =

U.S. Navy rear admiral (born 1963)

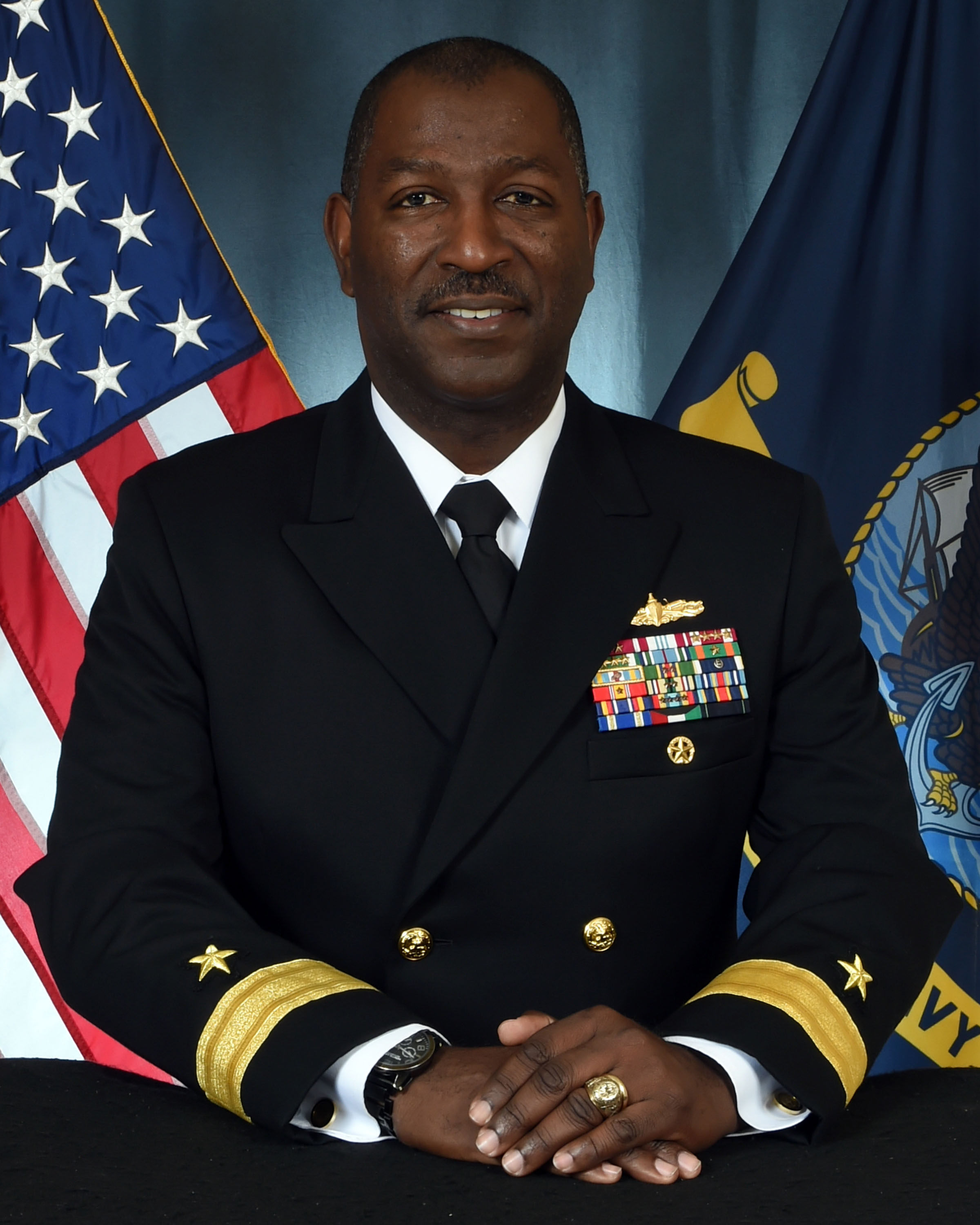
- Born: August 12, 1964 (age 62); Beaufort, South Carolina, U.S.
- Military career
- Allegiance: United States
- Branch: United States Navy
- Service years: 1986–2020
- Rank: Rear Admiral
- Commands: Carrier Strike Group 2 Naval Service Training Command; Destroyer Squadron 50; USS Mitscher (DDG-57)
- Conflicts: Gulf War
- Awards: Legion of Merit (3)

Stephen Carl Evans (born December 17, 1963) is a retired rear admiral in the United States Navy, who commanded Carrier Strike Group 2.

== Naval career ==
Evans' sea tours included service aboard the USS Theodore Roosevelt (CVN-71), the USS Deyo (DD-989) and the USS Hewitt (DD-966), before serving as executive officer of the USS Hué City and commanding officer of the USS Mitscher (DDG-57). Additionally, he was Commodore of Destroyer Squadron 50.

Duties ashore for Evans have include assignments with the Operational Test and Evaluation Force and Joint Warfare Analysis Center, as well as serving as Chairman of the Admissions Board of the United States Naval Academy, Senior Military Assistant to the United States Secretary of the Navy, and Commander of Naval Service Training Command.

Evans' awards include the Legion of Merit, the Defense Meritorious Service Medal, the Meritorious Service Medal, the Navy and Marine Corps Commendation Medal, the Joint Service Achievement Medal and the Navy and Marine Corps Achievement Medal.

== Personal ==
In the 2024 United States presidential election, Evans endorsed Kamala Harris.

== Education ==
- The Citadel, The Military College of South Carolina
- Naval War College
- Massachusetts Institute of Technology
