= William B. McLean =

US Navy physicist & primary inventor of the Sidewinder AAM

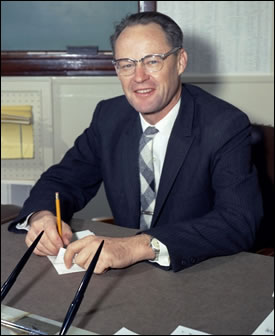
Dr. William B. McLean, technical director of NOTS, China Lake, Calif., November 1960.

William Burdette McLean (1914–1976) was a United States Navy physicist, who conceived and developed the heat-seeking Sidewinder missile. The Sidewinder was the first truly effective air-to-air missile; its variants and upgrades are still in active service.

The son of a Presbyterian minister, McLean attended Caltech, where he took three degrees in physics, finishing with a doctorate in 1939. During World War II, McLean worked on ordnance equipment and testing at the National Bureau of Standards in Washington, D.C. Following the war, he moved to the Naval Ordnance Test Station (NOTS), Inyokern, California (now the Naval Air Weapons Station China Lake), where he led the project team developing the Sidewinder missile from 1945 to 1954. In April 1954, he was appointed technical director, the senior civilian position at the Station, a position which he held till 1967.

For his work on the Sidewinder, he was awarded $25,000 and a plaque from President Eisenhower. He then served as technical director for the Navy's submarine-warfare research center in San Diego until 1974.

McLean was married to Edith LaVerne "LaV" McLean (died December 19, 2007).

The Memorial Award for Dr. William B. McLean was established in 1968, to recognize creativity in employees who furthered the mission at China Lake with significant inventions.

In 2008, the Navy announced that the dry cargo ship USNS William McLean (T-AKE-12) would be named in honor of Dr. McLean. On 16 April 2011, the ship was launched, sponsored by Dr. McLean's niece, Margaret Taylor.
