= USS Leyte Gulf =

Guided missile cruiser of the United States Navy

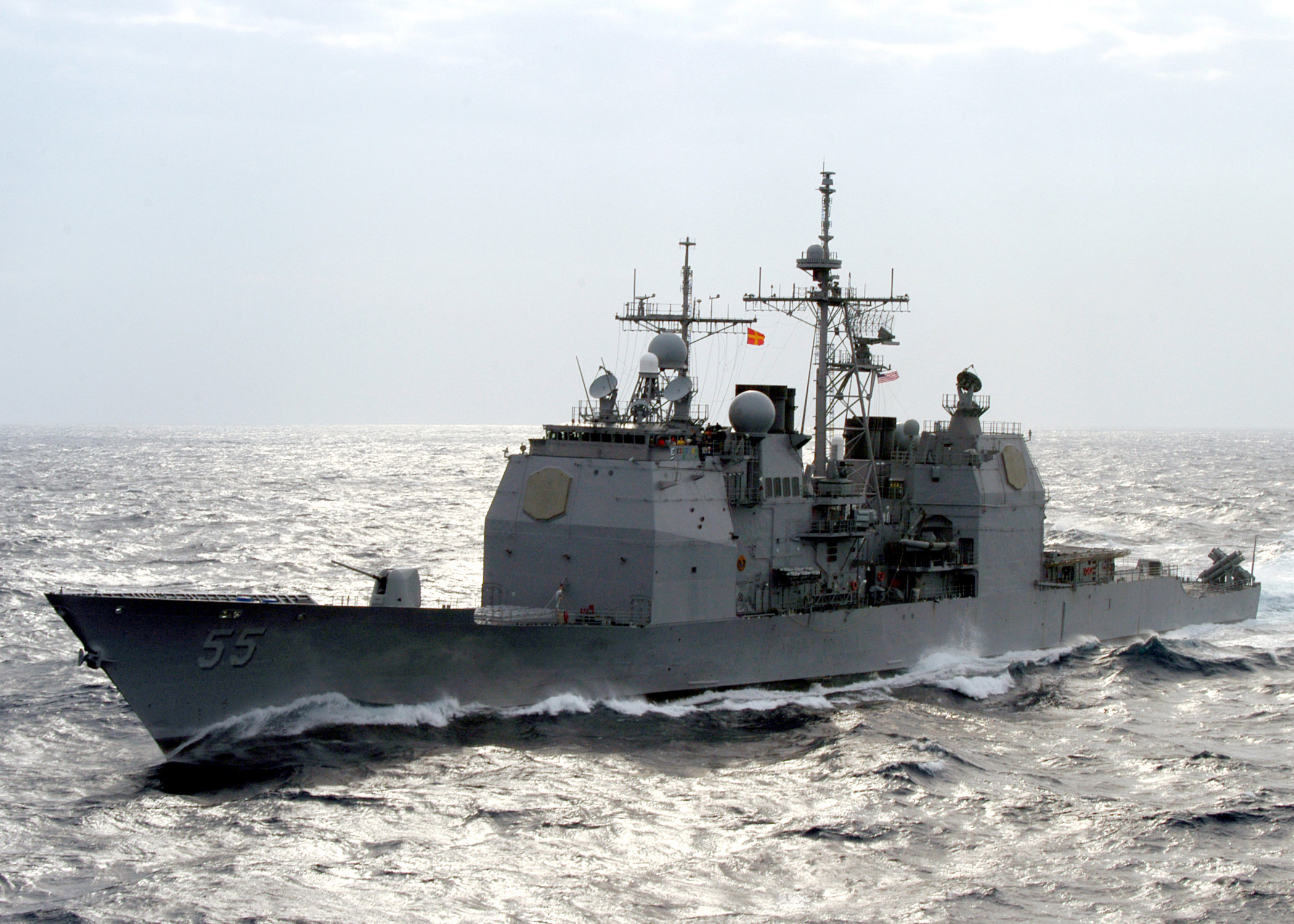
- USS Leyte Gulf on 22 February 2004

History

United States
- Name: Leyte Gulf
- Namesake: Battle of Leyte Gulf
- Ordered: 20 June 1983
- Builder: Ingalls Shipbuilding
- Laid down: 18 March 1985
- Launched: 20 June 1986
- Commissioned: 26 September 1987
- Decommissioned: 20 September 2024
- Identification: Call sign: NLEG; Hull number: CG-55
- Motto: Arrayed For Victory
- Nickname(s): Double Nickel, America's Battle Cruiser
- Status: Out of service
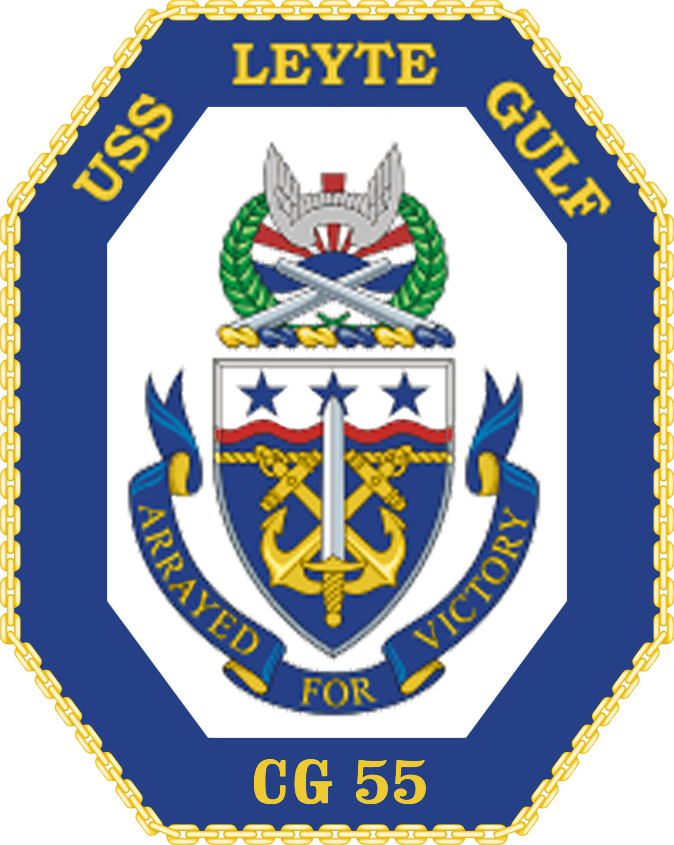
- Badge

General characteristics
- Class & type: Ticonderoga-class cruiser
- Displacement: Approx. 9,600 long tons (9,800 t) full load
- Length: 565 feet (172 meters) She lost 2 feet after colliding with USS Theodore Roosevelt (CVN-71)
- Beam: 55 feet (16.8 meters)
- Draft: 34 feet (10.2 meters)
- Propulsion: 4 × General Electric LM2500 gas turbine engines; 2 × controllable-reversible pitch propellers; 2 × rudders
- Speed: 32.5 knots (60 km/h; 37.4 mph)
- Complement: 30 officers and 300 enlisted
- Armament: 2 × 61 cell Mk 41 vertical launch systems containing; 122 × mix of: RIM-66M-5 Standard SM-2MR Block IIIB; RIM-156A SM-2ER Block IV; RIM-161 SM-3; RIM-162A ESSM; RIM-174A Standard ERAM; BGM-109 Tomahawk; RUM-139A VL-ASROC; 8 × RGM-84 Harpoon missiles; 2 × 5 in (127 mm)/62 caliber Mark 45 Mod 4 lightweight gun; 2 × Mk 38 25 mm Machine Gun Systems; 2–4 × .50 in (12.7 mm) cal. machine gun; 2 × Phalanx CIWS Block 1B; 2 × Mk 32 12.75 in (324 mm) triple torpedo tubes
- Aircraft carried: 2 × MH-60R Seahawk LAMPS Mk III helicopters.

USS Leyte Gulf (CG-55) is a decommissioned Ticonderoga-class guided missile cruiser in the United States Navy. She was named in memory of the World War II Battle of Leyte Gulf in the Pacific. She is powered by four large gas-turbine engines, and she has a large complement of guided missiles for air defense, attack of surface targets at sea and ashore, and anti-submarine warfare (ASW). In addition, she carries two "Seahawk" LAMPS multi-purpose helicopters, whose primary mission is ASW.

Leyte Gulf was laid down by the Litton-Ingalls Shipbuilding Corporation at Pascagoula, Mississippi, on 18 March 1985, launched on 20 June 1986, and commissioned on 26 September 1987 at Port Everglades, Florida.

Leyte Gulf was decommissioned on 20 September 2024 at Naval Station Norfolk, Virginia.

== History ==
Leyte Gulf deployed with the Theodore Roosevelt Battle Group as part of her second regularly scheduled deployment to the Mediterranean Sea, right after Christmas in December 1990. Rather than staying in the Mediterranean, though, she and her battle group were ordered through the Suez Canal as a preparation for hostilities under the about-to-start Operation Desert Storm. She escorted Theodore Roosevelt as the first ship astern of the carrier as they passed through the canal. Upon exiting the Suez Canal both Leyte Gulf and Theodore Roosevelt were ordered to detach from the remainder of their conventionally fueled battle group and make maximum possible speed for the Persian Gulf. To fulfill this order, Leyte Gulf maintained her highest possible speed (Flank 3) for 3 full days (a likely record for this class of ship) as these two ships travelled at maximum speed down the length of the Red Sea, around the Arabian Peninsula, and finally entered the Persian Gulf on 17 January 1991, after hostilities had begun. Left behind in the Red Sea because no refueling ship could keep up with Leyte Gulf and Theodore Roosevelt during their full-power run, Leyte Gulf instead refueled from Theodore Roosevelt herself as they made full speed for the Persian Gulf. The importance of that break-neck speed was due to uncertainty about Yemen's position on the war. Getting the carrier beyond shore batteries and short range patrol boats in the narrow straights was a priority before hostilities could commence on 16 January.

On 14 October 1996, Leyte Gulf collided with the Nimitz-class aircraft carrier, USS Theodore Roosevelt while conducting operations off the coast of North Carolina. The incident occurred as the carrier, without prior warning, reversed her engines while Leyte Gulf was behind her and slammed into the cruiser's bow. There were no personnel casualties or injuries reported, and damage to the Leyte was only $2 million.

In 1999, Leyte Gulf participated in Operation Allied Force.

In 2002, she won the Marjorie Sterrett Battleship Fund Award for the Atlantic Fleet.

In late 1992 Leyte Gulf was assigned to Carrier Group 2. In March 2003 Leyte Gulf was assigned to Carrier Group Eight.

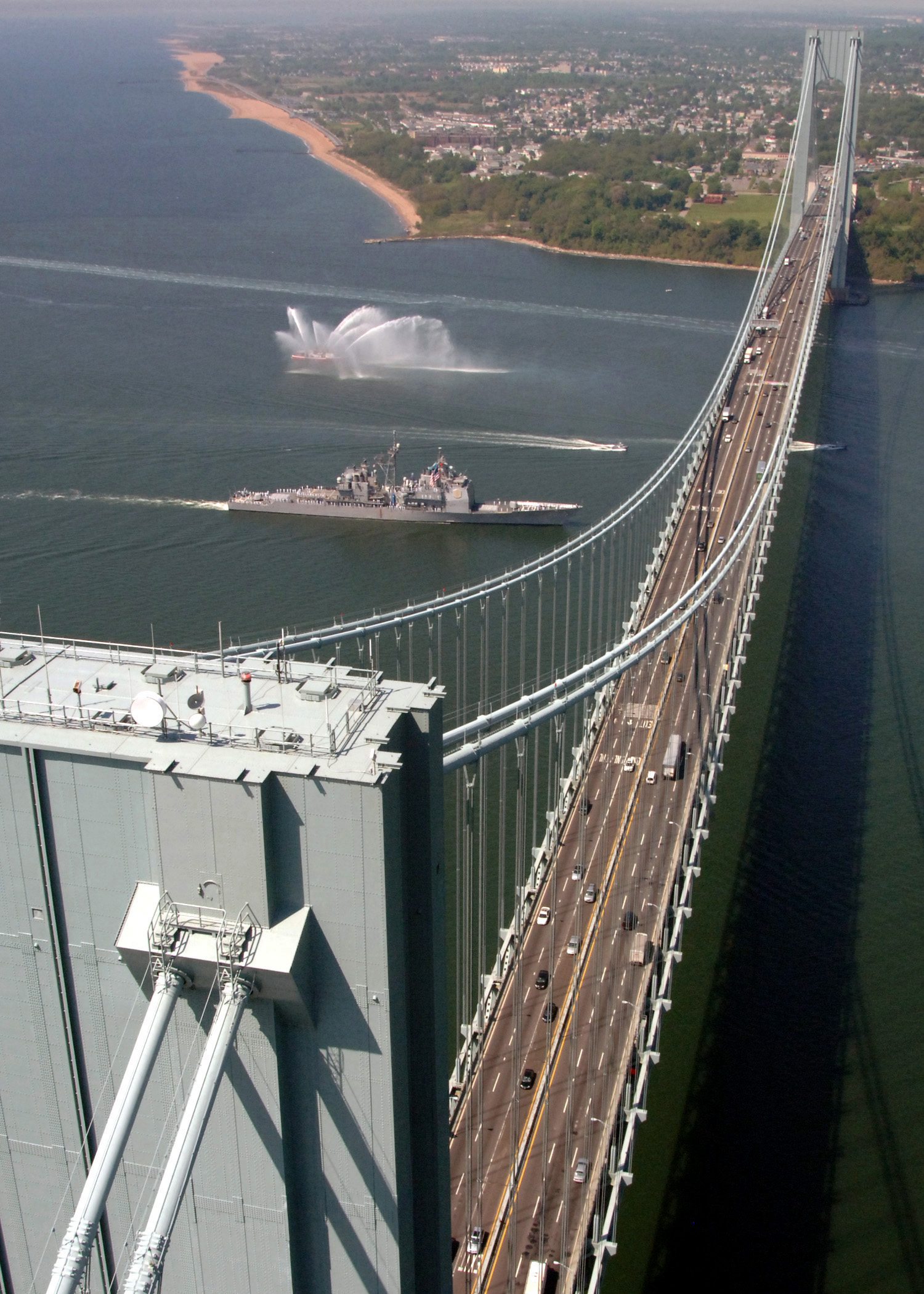
USS Leyte Gulf steams under the Verrazzano–Narrows Bridge during the parade of ships on the opening day of New York Fleet Week 2008.

On 15 September 2007, there was a fire aboard Leyte Gulf as she underwent an extensive modernization program in BAE Systems Shipyard in Norfolk, Virginia. Initially the fire received national attention due to the possibility that it was a terrorist incident, however, it was quickly revealed to be an industrial accident. Five shipyard workers were injured in the incident, one seriously, but no naval personnel were involved.

In February 2011, Leyte Gulf was involved in an incident with Somali pirates after they captured the United States flagged yacht Quest.

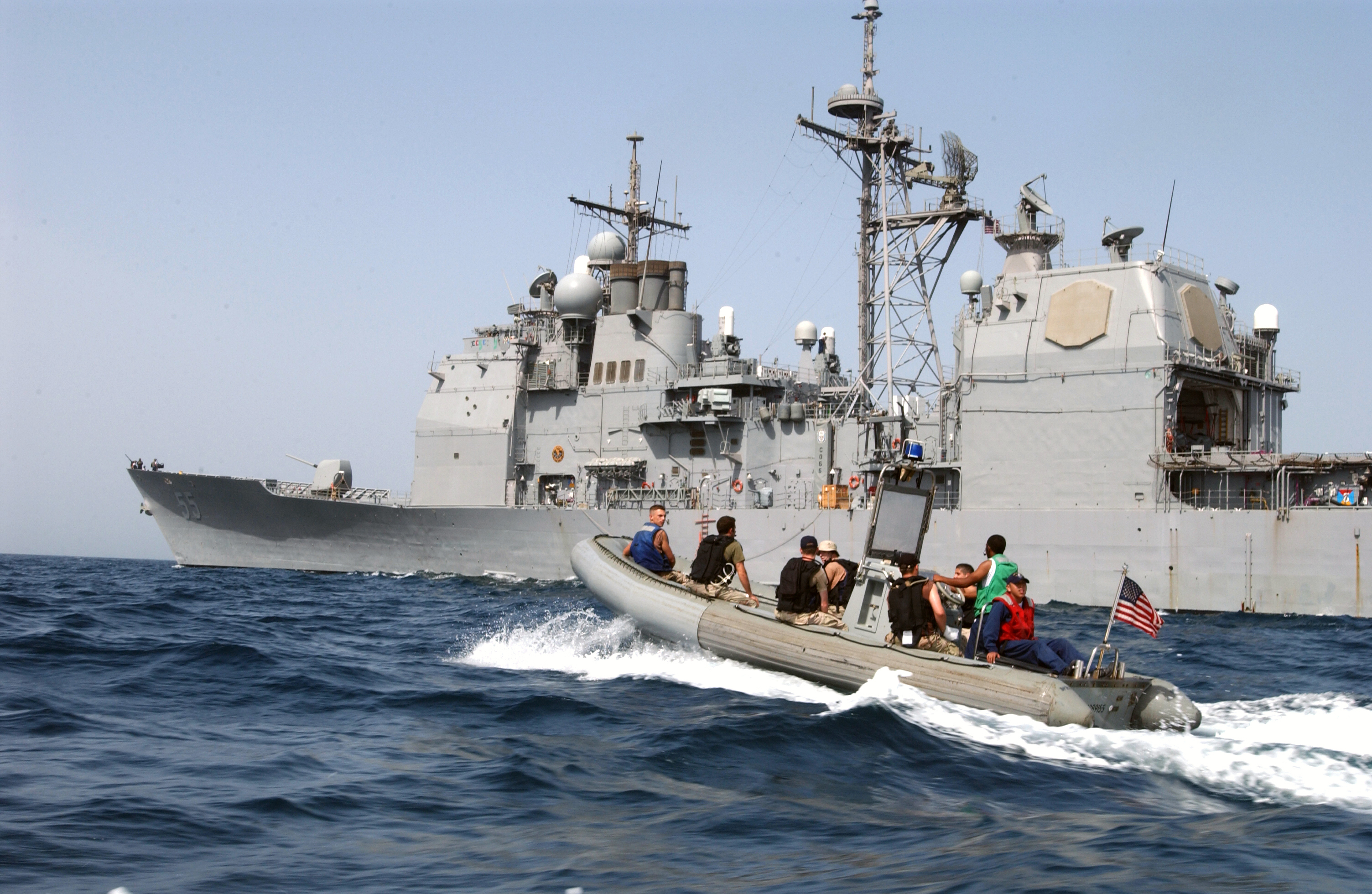
U.S. sailors from USS Leyte Gulf's Vessel Board Search and Seizure Team return to their ship

The cruiser returned to Norfolk on 15 July 2011. During her deployment, she had participated in operations which had captured 75 Somali pirates and had missile strikes by her carrier strike group against the Libyan government.

In January 2015, Leyte Gulf returned from a six-month deployment to the Mediterranean Sea. The ship served as flagship of Standing NATO Maritime Group 2 for much of the deployment.

In August 2022 Leyte Gulf was again deployed to the Mediterranean Sea. She returned to Norfolk on 9 June 2023.

On 29 January 2024, Leyte Gulf deployed Sunday from Naval Station Norfolk, Va., to the 4th Fleet area of operations, which includes the Caribbean and Central and South America. It will host HSM-50, Helicopter Maritime Strike Squadron 50 and Coast Guard Law Enforcement Detachment 404 and is expected to conduct passing exercises with regional partners and make port visits to counter threats such as illegal drug trafficking. She returned to Naval Station Norfolk on 17 May 2024. This will be her final deployment before decommissioning.

In March 2024, the Navy announced plans to inactivate Leyte Gulf on 20 September 2024.

On March 21, 2024, the Leyte Gulf and the US Coast Guard captured a narco-submarine 150 miles off the coast of Guyana carrying 5,225 pounds of cocaine.

On September 20, 2024 at Naval Station Norfolk, USS Leyte Gulf (CG-55) was decommissioned with Commanding Officer Commander Brian Harrington and Command Master Chief Michael Jedrykowski presiding.

== See also ==
- Carrier Strike Group Two
