= Frank Craig Pandolfe =

American Navy admiral

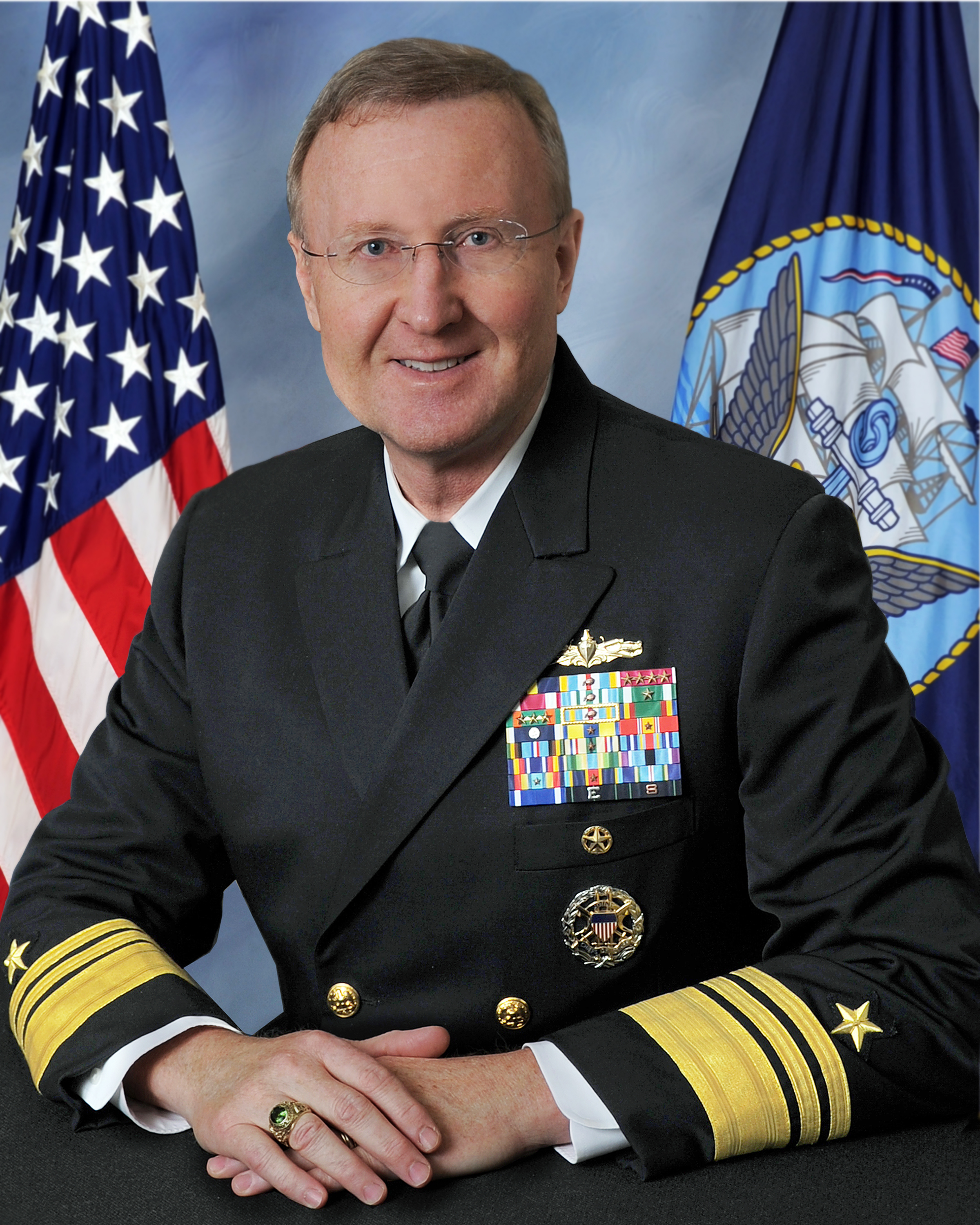
- Born: Frank Craig Pandolfe; 1958 (age 67–68)
- Allegiance: United States of America
- Branch: United States Navy
- Service years: 1980–2017
- Rank: Vice Admiral
- Commands: ACJCS; J-5, Joint Staff; United States Sixth Fleet; Destroyer squadron 18; USS Mitscher (DDG-57)
- Conflicts: War in Afghanistan
- Awards: Defense Distinguished Service Medal; Navy Distinguished Service Medal; Defense Superior Service Medal (2); Legion of Merit (5)

Frank Craig Pandolfe (born 1958) is a retired Vice Admiral in the United States Navy, and last served as the Assistant to the Chairman of the Joint Chiefs of Staff. Before, he was the Director, Strategic Plans and Policy, J-5, the Joint Staff. He had his retirement ceremony in September 2017, after more than 40 years of service.

== Career ==
Frank Pandolfe is from Scituate, Massachusetts where he was a star track athlete before graduating from Scituate High School in 1976. Pandolfe graduated from the United States Naval Academy in 1980. He later obtained a Ph.D. from The Fletcher School of Law and Diplomacy at Tufts University in Boston, Massachusetts.

Pandolfe commanded USS Mitscher (DDG-57) from 1999 to 2001. During that time, the ship was awarded the Battle Efficiency Award three times. He later served in the War in Afghanistan (2001–present).

Other positions he has held include serving in the Offices of the Chief of Naval Operations, Joint Staff and in the White House. He also served as Commander, of the United States Sixth Fleet. He is the Vice President and Strategic Account Executive for the Navy & Marine Corps at Leidos.

== Awards and decorations ==

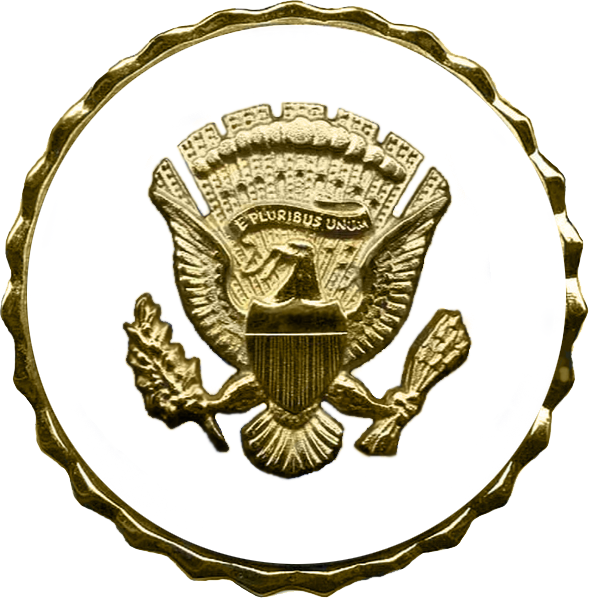

Surface Warfare Officer Pin
Defense Distinguished Service Medal
Navy Distinguished Service Medal	Defense Superior Service Medal w/ 1 bronze oak leaf cluster	Legion of Merit w/ 4 gold award stars
Meritorious Service Medal w/ 3 award stars	Joint Service Commendation Medal w/ 1 oak leaf cluster	Navy and Marine Corps Commendation Medal w/ 1 award star
Navy and Marine Corps Achievement Medal	Joint Meritorious Unit Award w/ 1 oak leaf cluster	Navy Unit Commendation
Navy "E" Ribbon with Wreathed "Battle E" device	Navy Expeditionary Medal with service star	National Defense Service Medal with service star
Armed Forces Expeditionary Medal	Southwest Asia Service Medal with service star	Global War on Terrorism Expeditionary Medal
Global War on Terrorism Service Medal	Armed Forces Service Medal	Humanitarian Service Medal
Navy Sea Service Deployment Ribbon with silver service star	Navy and Marine Corps Overseas Service Ribbon with service star	Special Operations Service Ribbon
NATO Medal for the former Yugoslavia	Navy Expert Rifleman Medal	Navy Pistol Marksmanship Ribbon with Sharpshooter Device
Command at Sea insignia
Office of the Joint Chiefs of Staff Identification Badge
Vice Presidential Service Badge

Military offices
Preceded by Harry B. Harris Jr.	Commander United States Sixth Fleet; October 2011 – October 2013	Succeeded by Philip S. Davidson
