= USNS William McLean =

US Navy cargo ship (built 2011)

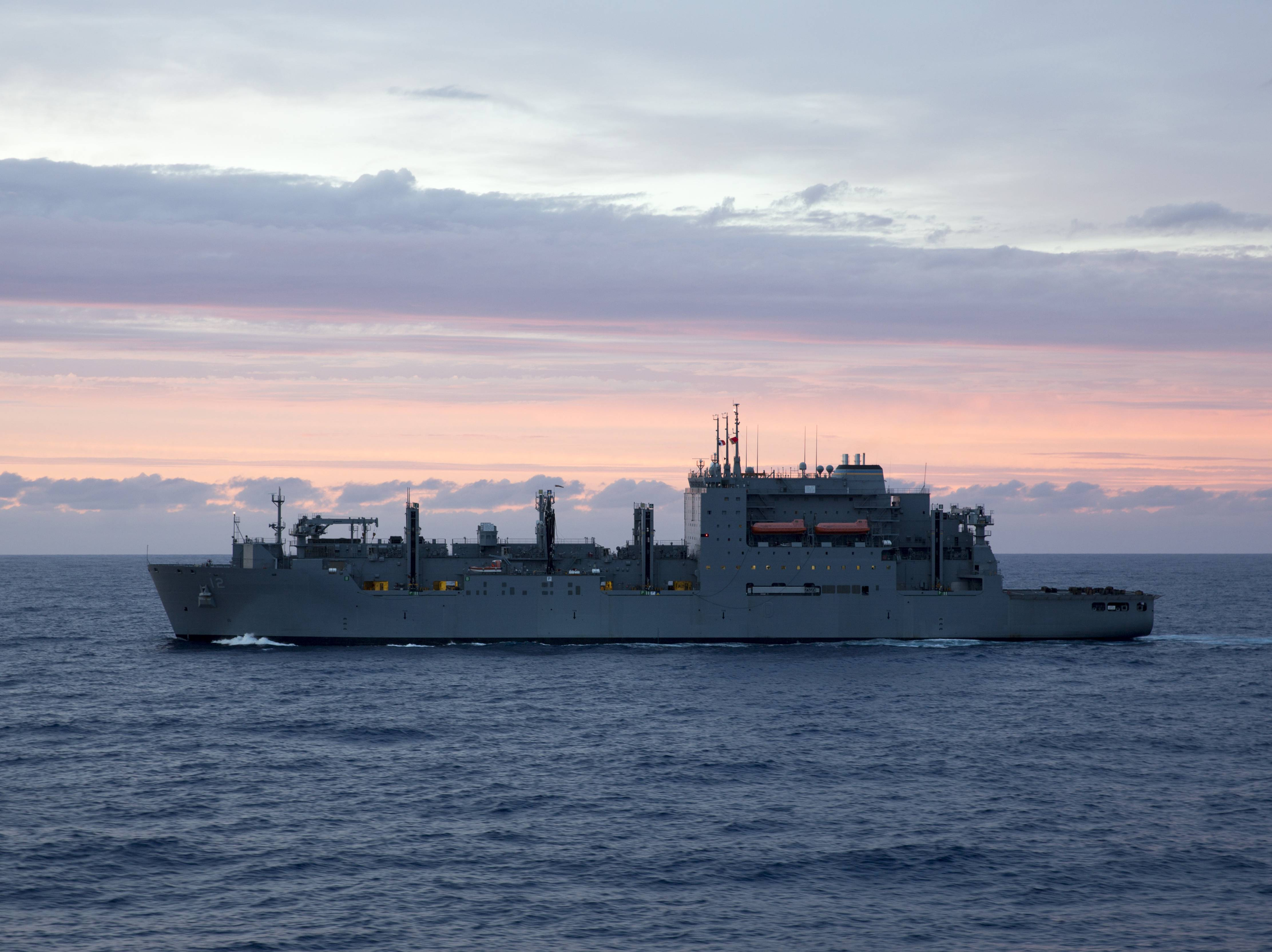
- USNS William McLean (T-AKE 12) in October 2013

History
- Name: William McLean
- Namesake: William McLean
- Awarded: 12 December 2008
- Builder: National Steel and Shipbuilding
- Laid down: 23 March 2010
- Launched: 16 April 2011
- Sponsored by: Margaret Taylor
- In service: 28 September 2011
- Home port: Naval Weapons Station Earle, Colts Neck, NJ
- Identification: IMO number: 9552006; MMSI number: 367852000; Callsign: NWMC
- Motto: Si Vis Pacem • Para Bellum
- Status: In service U.S. Atlantic Fleet
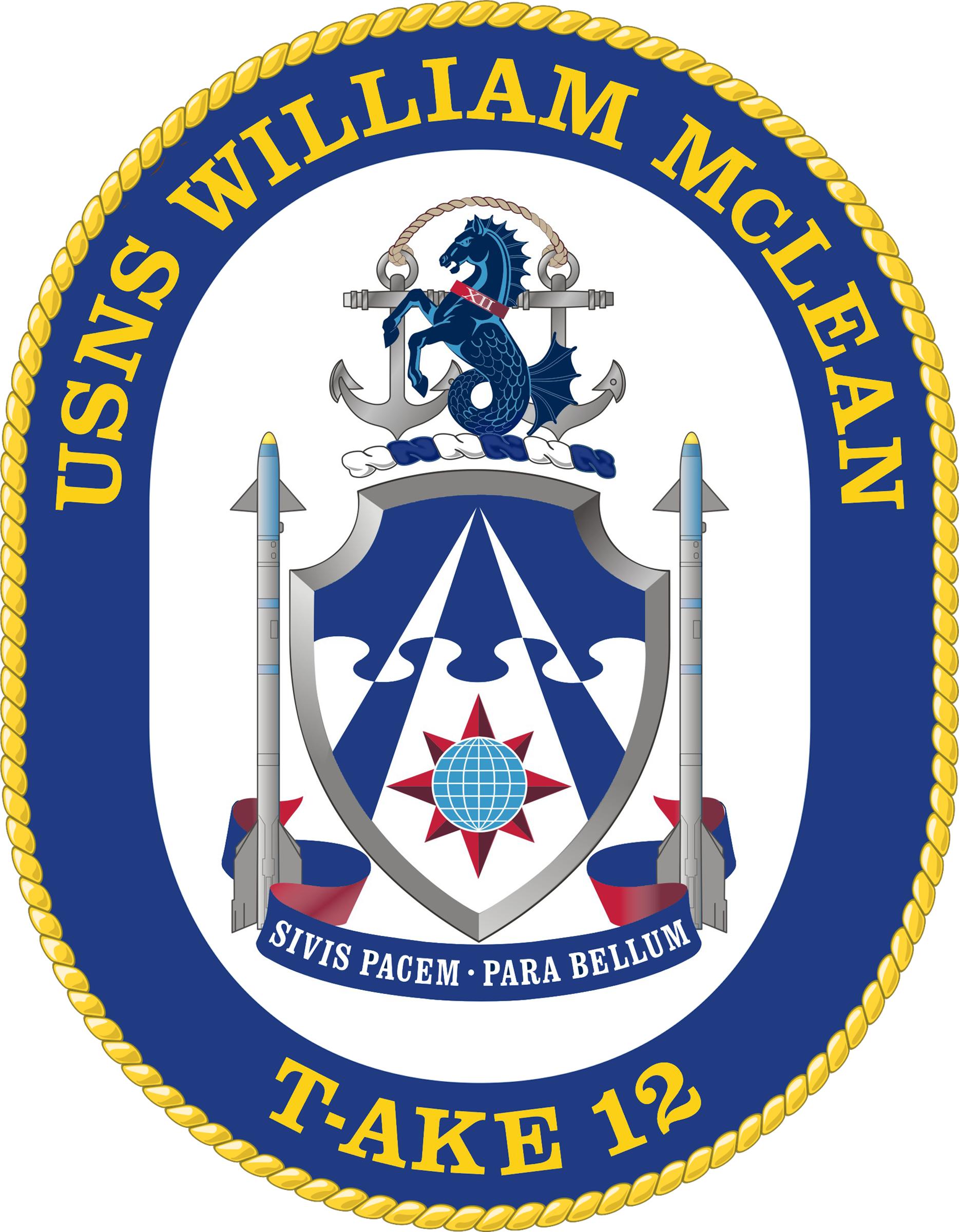
- Badge

General characteristics
- Class & type: Lewis and Clark-class cargo ship
- Displacement: 23,852 tons light, 40,298 tons full, 16,446 tons dead
- Length: 210 m (689 ft) overall, 199.3 m (654 ft) waterline
- Beam: 32.3 m (106 ft) extreme, 32.3 m (106 ft) waterline
- Draft: 9.1 m (30 ft) maximum, 9.4 m (31 ft) limit
- Propulsion: Integrated propulsion and ship service electrical system, with generation at 6.6 kV by FM/MAN B&W diesel generators; one fixed pitch propeller; bow thruster
- Speed: 20 knots (37 km/h)
- Range: 14,000 nautical miles at 20 kt; (26,000 km at 37 km/h)
- Capacity: Max dry cargo weight: 5,910 long tons (6,000 t); Max dry cargo volume: 783,000 cubic feet (22,200 m^{3}); Max cargo fuel weight: 2,350 long tons (2,390 t); Cargo fuel volume: 18,000 barrels (2,900 m³); (DFM: 10,500) (JP5:7,500)
- Complement: 0 military, 130 civilian
- Electronic warfare & decoys: Nulka decoy launchers (space allocated but not installed)
- Armament: 2–6 × 0.5 in (12.7 mm) machine guns; or 7.62 mm medium machine guns
- Aircraft carried: two helicopters, either Sikorsky MH-60S Knighthawk or Aerospatiale Puma

USNS William McLean (T-AKE 12) is a Lewis and Clark-class dry cargo ship of the United States Navy, named in honor of William McLean, a United States Navy physicist, who conceived and developed the heat-seeking Sidewinder missile. The contract to build William McLean was awarded to National Steel and Shipbuilding Company on 12 December 2008. William McLean was launched on 16 April 2011, sponsored by Dr. McLean's niece, Margaret Taylor. The ship was delivered to the Military Sealift Command (MSC) on 28 September 2011.

== Ship's badge ==
USNS William McLean has a shield "Per fess nebuly enhanced, two piles reversed in chief point issuant from dexter and sinister base, Azure and Argent, all counterchanged, in base a compass rose Gules bearing a globe Celeste with grid lines of the second; a bordure of steel Proper." Her crest is "From a wreath Argent and Azure two steel anchors erect Proper, superimposed by a seahorse rampant of the second gorged with a collar Gules charged with the Roman numerals "XII" Argent, all below an arced rope Proper tied to each anchor ring." Her motto is "A scroll, with ends behind base of the missiles, Azure doubled Gules and inscribed with "SI VIS PACEM, PARA BELLUM" (IF YOU WANT PEACE, PREPARE FOR THE WAR) Argent." and her supporters are "On either side of the shield a Sidewinder heat-seeking Missile erect Proper." The ship's seal is "the coat of arms as blazoned in full color upon a white oval enclosed by a blue collar edged on the outside with a gold rope bearing the inscription "USNS WILLIAM McLEAN" at top and in base "T-AKE 12" in gold letters."

=== Symbolism ===
- Shield: "Dark blue and gold are the colors traditionally used by the Navy. Gold is also emblematic of honor and high achievement. Blue and white echo the colors of the sea. The nebuly partition line is intended to look like clouds as depicted in heraldry. The two narrow pointed wedge shapes with points going up through the clouds allude to two launched missiles locking in on their target. The counterchanged colors stand for unity and cooperation. The clouds and sky also refer to the aviation capabilities of the USNS WILLIAM McLEAN. The compass rose and globe emphasize the world wide mission of the T-AKE ship. The thick steel border denotes strength and resolve."
- Crest: "The anchors, symbols of sea prowess, with the T-AKE being represented by one and the other, our Naval force. The rope connecting them signifies receiving the steady flow of cargo and ammunition from the T-AKE. The seahorse, strong and dependable, personifies the USNS WILLIAM McLEAN's being a work horse to the Navy providing a steady, secure stream of dry cargo and ammunition. The red of the collar inscribed with XII stands for the zeal and bravery of the mariners aboard T-AKE 12 and the warfighters it services."
- Supporters: "The Sidewinder missiles commemorate William McLean, the U.S. Navy physicist who conceived and developed the heat-seeking sidewinder missile."

== Deployments ==
On 22 December 2016 the USNS William McLean returned to Naval Weapons Station Yorktown from a 47-day surge deployment to the United States Sixth Fleet in the Mediterranean Sea.

McLean helped the Navy's Multipurpose Amphibious Assault and Transport ships, USS Wasp and USS San Antonio, as part of Operation Odyssey Lightning.

On Tuesday February 3rd 2026 USNS William McLean departed Naval Station Norfolk on a 5 month deployment to the US Navy's 6th Fleet. It is currently ported in Greece having met up with USS Gerald R. Ford for logistical support. McLean is now on its own with USS Gerald R Ford out of action due to a fire. McLean will remain in Greece until further notice.

On August 24th 2026 USNS William McLean arrived at Naval Weapons Station Yorktown and then departed and arrived at churchland in Portsmouth, Virginia on August 28th and as of September 5th in Alabama.
