= USS Mitscher (DDG-57) =

Arleigh Burke-class destroyer

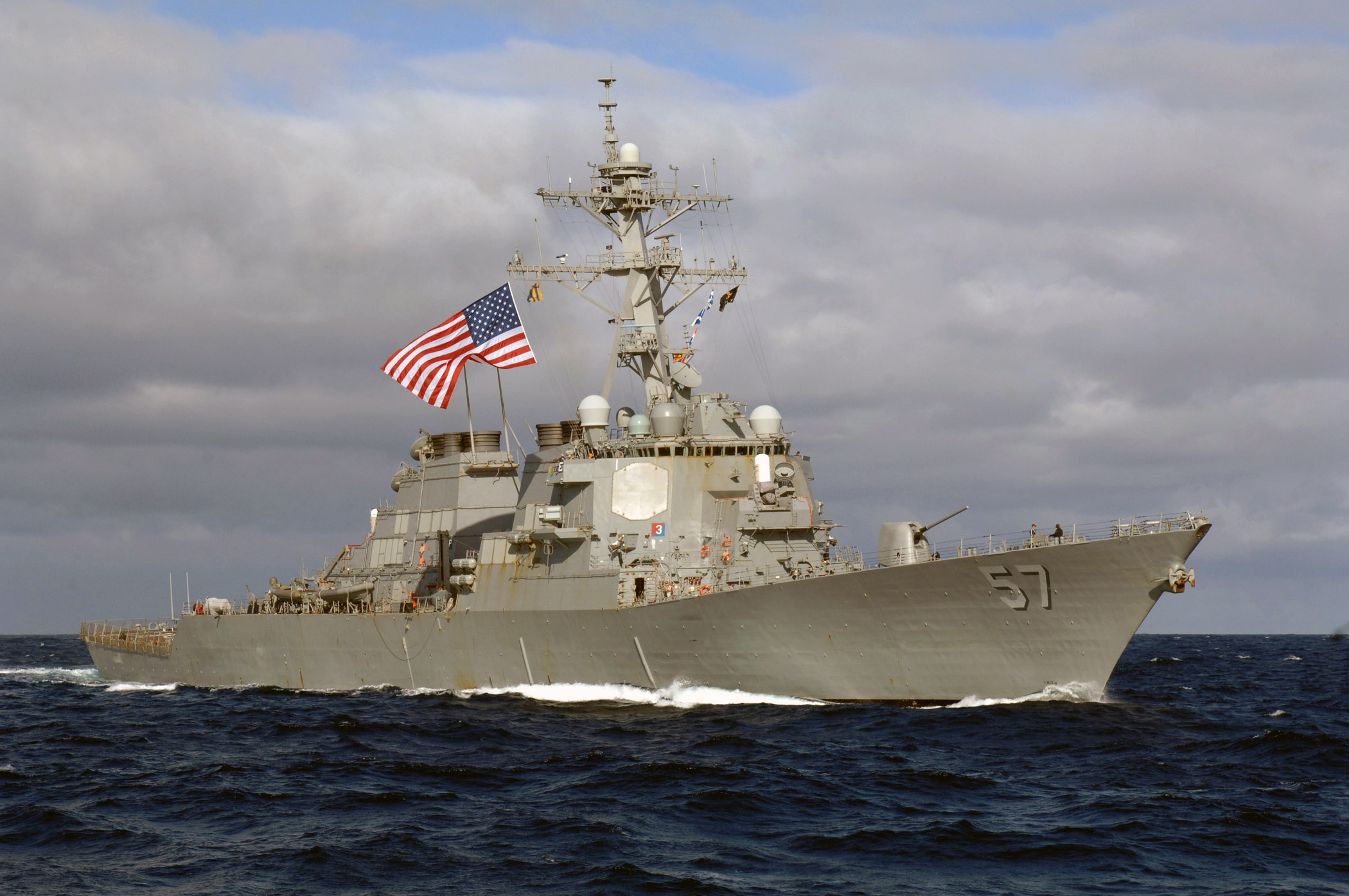
- USS Mitscher (DDG-57)

History

United States
- Name: Mitscher
- Namesake: Marc A. Mitscher
- Ordered: 13 December 1988
- Builder: Ingalls Shipbuilding
- Laid down: 12 February 1992
- Launched: 7 May 1993
- Commissioned: 10 December 1994
- Home port: Norfolk
- Identification: MMSI number: 366996000; Callsign: NMTR; Hull number: DDG-57
- Motto: Seize the Day
- Status: in active service
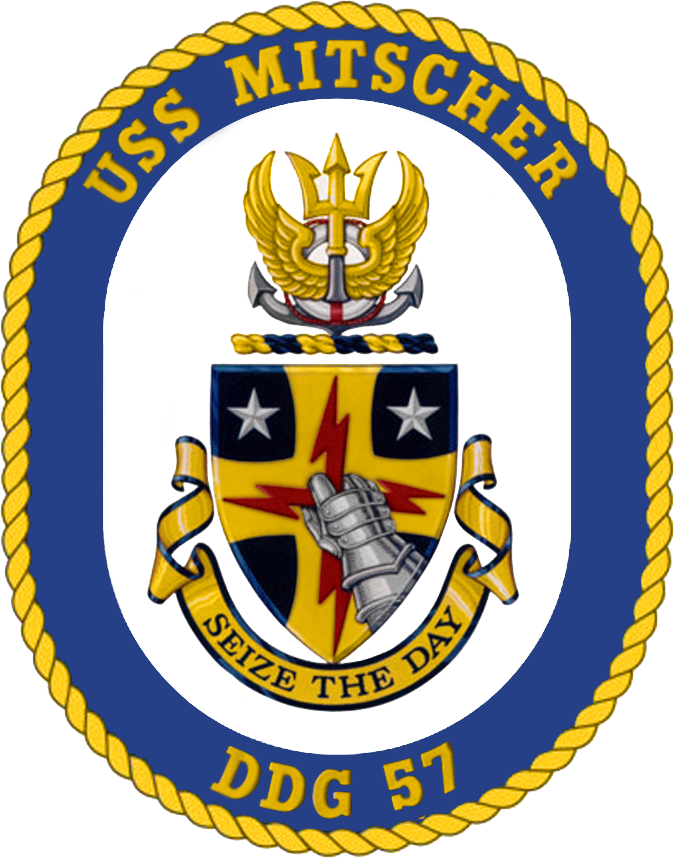
- Badge

General characteristics
- Class & type: Arleigh Burke-class destroyer
- Displacement: Light: approx. 6,800 long tons (6,900 t); Full: approx. 8,900 long tons (9,000 t)
- Length: 505 ft (154 m)
- Beam: 59 ft (18 m)
- Draft: 31 ft (9.4 m)
- Propulsion: 2 × shafts
- Speed: In excess of 30 kn (56 km/h; 35 mph)
- Range: 4,400 nmi (8,100 km; 5,100 mi) at 20 kn (37 km/h; 23 mph)
- Complement: 33 commissioned officers; 38 chief petty officers; 210 enlisted personnel
- Sensors & processing systems: AN/SPY-1D PESA 3D radar (Flight I, II, IIA); AN/SPY-6(V)1 AESA 3D radar (Flight III); AN/SPS-67(V)3 or (V)5 surface search radar (DDG-51 – DDG-118); AN/SPQ-9B surface search radar (DDG-119 onward); AN/SPS-73(V)12 surface search/navigation radar (DDG-51 – DDG-86); BridgeMaster E surface search/navigation radar (DDG-87 onward); 3 × AN/SPG-62 fire-control radar; Mk 46 optical sight system (Flight I, II, IIA); Mk 20 electro-optical sight system (Flight III); AN/SQQ-89 ASW combat system: AN/SQS-53C sonar array; AN/SQR-19 tactical towed array sonar (Flight I, II, IIA); TB-37U multi-function towed array sonar (DDG-113 onward); AN/SQQ-28 LAMPS III shipboard system
- Electronic warfare & decoys: AN/SLQ-32 electronic warfare suite; AN/SLQ-25 Nixie torpedo countermeasures; Mk 36 Mod 12 decoy launching systems; Mk 53 Nulka decoy launching systems; Mk 59 decoy launching systems
- Armament: Guns: 1 × 5-inch (127 mm)/54 mk 45 mod 1/2 (lightweight gun); 2 × 20 mm (0.8 in) Phalanx CIWS; 2 × 25 mm (0.98 in) Mk 38 machine gun system; 4 × 0.50 inches (12.7 mm) caliber guns; Missiles: 2 × Mk 141 Harpoon anti-ship missile launcher; 1 × 29-cell, 1 × 61-cell (90 total cells) Mk 41 vertical launching system (VLS): RIM-66M surface-to-air missile; RIM-156 surface-to-air missile; RIM-161 anti-ballistic missile; BGM-109 Tomahawk cruise missile; RUM-139 vertical launch ASROC; Torpedoes: 2 × Mark 32 triple torpedo tubes: Mark 46 lightweight torpedo; Mark 50 lightweight torpedo; Mark 54 lightweight torpedo
- Aircraft carried: 1 × Sikorsky MH-60R

USS Mitscher (DDG-57) is an Arleigh Burke-class (Flight I) Aegis guided missile destroyer in service with the United States Navy. It was constructed by Ingalls Shipbuilding, in Pascagoula, Mississippi on an order in December 1988. Laid down in 1992 it was formally commissioned on 10 December 1994.

== Namesake ==
USS Mitscher (DDG-57) became the second United States Navy warship named to honor Admiral Marc A. Mitscher (1887–1947), famed naval aviator and World War II aircraft carrier task force commander.

== Service history ==
Mitscher was commissioned on 10 December 1994, and was sponsored by Mrs. Elizabeth Ferguson. Mitscher transferred to her homeport in Norfolk, Virginia later in December 1994, and has since made three Mediterranean deployments and participated in many Caribbean exercises. On 20 September 1998 a plaque was dedicated to Mitscher at Mahon (Naval) Cemetery where US and UK sailors lie at rest, some from various ships in the 1800s.

In 2001, Mitscher deployed with Carrier Group 2 centered on the aircraft carrier Harry S. Truman. In October 2006, Mitscher participated in Neptune Warrior, a joint war exercise with navies from all over the world.

On 16 February 2007, Mitscher was awarded the 2006 Battle "E" award.

Beginning 23 July 2011, during its 2011 deployment, the strike group's anti-piracy capabilities was augmented by the addition of a U.S. Coast Guard 12-person Advanced Interdiction Team (AIT) embarked aboard Mitscher. These deployable Coast Guard boarding teams consisted of highly trained maritime law enforcement specialists capable of Level III non-compliant boardings. As the only organization in the U.S. government with the combined authority of a law enforcement agency, an intelligence agency, and a military service, they brought additional capabilities and expertise to Mitscher's embarked visit, board, search and seizure (VBSS) team. Mitscher's VBSS team and the AIT trained together between operations to enhance their joint boarding tactics, boat operation skills, and internal movements.

On 13 August 2011, as part of Combined Task Force 150 operating in the Gulf of Aden, Mitscher provided assistance to the Sri Lankan-flagged cargo vessel Al Habib which was experiencing engineering problems and running low on water. Mitscher's VBSS-AIT boarding party transported supplies to Al Habib via rigid-hulled inflatable boat, including two 3-gallon (11.36 liters) containers of water and four cases of bottled water.

On 24 February 2012 Commander Monika W. Stoker became the first African-American female to become the commanding officer of a U.S. destroyer. Commander Stoker relieved Commander Brian K. Sorrenson after serving as his executive officer for 20 months prior.

On 2 June 2015, Mitscher welcomed the Hermione in US waters on behalf of the US Navy.

On 16 April 2022, Mitscher arrived at Norfolk following a surge deployment.

On 9 August 2023, The Navy announced plans to extend the ship's service life beyond the initial 35 years, intending to keep Mitscher in service until at least 2034.

== Awards ==
- Battle "E" – (2019)

== Coat of arms ==
The combined anchor and trident symbolize sea prowess and combat readiness. The life preserver ringing the anchor commemorates Admiral Mitscher's compassion for his crew as manifested through his relentless determination in tracking down and recovering downed air crews. The three tines of the trident represent the ship's significant capabilities in strike, air, and subsurface warfare. The trident's position, rising above the crest, symbolizes the ability to project power over great distances. The gold wings represent Admiral Mitscher's service and dedication, throughout his career, in advancing naval aviation and developing strike warfare. Dark blue and gold are the colors traditionally associated with the Navy and represent the sea and excellence. Red is emblematic of sacrifice and valor. The cross throughout the shield recalls the Navy Cross Admiral Mitscher was awarded for his participation in the first successful transatlantic air passage. The two stars above the cross commemorate his awards of 2nd and 3rd Distinguished Service Medals and his 2nd and 3rd awards of the Navy Cross for meritorious service during operations in the Pacific during World War II. The armored gauntlet represents the strength and survivability of the ship. The lightning bolts symbolize energy and speed and the ability of the ship to conduct multi-mission operations in any dimension. The gauntlet grasping the lightning bolts highlights USS MITSCHER's motto "SEIZE THE DAY", recalling Admiral Mitscher's tenacious fighting spirit and dignifying DDG 57's legacy.
