= Carrier Strike Group Ten 2004–09 operations =

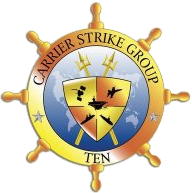
Carrier Strike Group Ten crest

Carrier Strike Group Ten was involved in a number of operations between 2004–2009. Carrier Strike Group Ten was a U.S. Navy carrier strike group. In 2004–09 it was based at Naval Station Norfolk. In those five years it made two Middle East providing air and naval support for the War in Iraq and the War in Afghanistan, as well as Operation Vigilant Resolve, and Joint Task Force Exercise 05-2 (JTFEX 05-2). In 2004–09 the group's flagship was the Nimitz-class nuclear-powered aircraft carrier USS Harry S. Truman (CVN-75).

== 2004–2006 Operations ==
=== 2004 Mediterranean deployment ===
The strike group departed Norfolk on 13 October 2004 for an extended deployment under the command of Rear Admiral Michael C. Tracy. The strike group participates in the Joint Maritime Course (JMC-043) north of Scotland between 25–28 October 2004. JMC-043 included strike, surface, and submarine warfare exercises with a multi-national force. CARSTRKGRU 10 subsequently paid by a port visit to Souda Bay, Crete, between 5–8 November 2004. Despite plans to cross the equator and visited South Africa, diplomatic issues caused the strike group to transit the Suez Canal, stopping in Portsmouth, England, prior to returning to the United States on 19 April 2005.

==== Force composition ====
Units	Group Warships	Carrier Air Wing Nine squadrons	
#1	USS Monterey (CG-61)	Marine Fighter Attack Squadron 115 (VMFA-115): 12 FA-18A+	Helicopter Anti-Submarine Squadron 7 (HS-7): 3 HH-60S & 4 SH-60S
#2	USS Mason (DDG-87)	Strike Fighter Squadron 105 (VFA-105): 12 FA-18C(N)	Fleet Logistics Support Squadron 40 (VRC-40), Det. 4: 2 C-2A
#3	USS Barry (DDG-52)	Strike Fighter Squadron 37 (VFA-37): 10 FA-18C(N)	Helicopter Antisubmarine Squadron Light 46 (HSL-46)
#4	USS Albuquerque (SSN-706)	Fighter Squadron 32 (FA-32): 10 F-14B	HSL-46 Det 3: 2 SH-60B – USS Monterey
#5	USNS Arctic (T-AOE-8)	Tactical Electronics Warfare Squadron 130 (VAQ-130): 4 EA-6B	HSL-46 Det 8: 2 SH-60B – USS Mason
#6	–	Carrier Airborne Early Warning Squadron (VAW-126): 4 E-2C	–
Notes			

==== Fifth Fleet operations ====
Carrier Strike Group Ten transited the Suez Canal on 11 November 2004 and relieved the John F. Kennedy carrier strike group on 20 November 2004. Truman and Carrier Air Wing 3 launched 2,577 sorties, totaling nearly 13,000 flight hours, in support of Iraq and maritime security operations (MSO) before being relieved by the USS Carl Vinson Carrier Strike Group in the Persian Gulf on 19 March 2005. One major air operation involved a VAW-126 detachment of two E-2C Hawkeyes that operated out of Kandahar Air Base, Afghanistan, from 4–13 December 2004. The detachment's mission was to provide airborne command and control for the inauguration of Hamid Karzai, Afghanistan's first democratically elected president. This event was attended by an entourage led by U.S. Vice President Richard B. Cheney and Secretary of Defense Donald H. Rumsfeld.

==== Exercises & port visits ====
Number	Regional Exercises				Port Visits		Notes
Number	Duration	U.S. Force	Bilateral/Multilateral Partner(s)	Operating Area	Location	Dates	Notes
1st:	25–28 October 2004	Carrier Strike Group 10	Joint Maritime Course (JMC-043)	Eastern Atlantic	Souda Bay, Crete	5–8 Nov 2004	
2nd:	—	—	—	—	Bahrain	13–18 Dec 2004	
3rd:	—	—	—	—	Portsmouth, England	4 April 2005	

=== Joint Task Force Exercise 05-2 (JTFEX 05-2), Operation Brewing Storm ===
The aircraft carrier Harry S. Truman was reassigned at the flagship for Carrier Strike Group Ten, and the Theodore Roosevelt was reassigned at the flagship for Carrier Strike Group Two.

The group then participated in Joint Task Force Exercise 05-2 (JTFEX 05-2), Operation Brewing Storm, between 14–22 July 2005. Brewing Storm presented U.S. and coalition forces with realistic and dynamic exercise threats that closely replicated operational challenges forces routinely encounter around the world. It was designed to provide quality, realistic training to prepare U.S. forces for joint and combined operations. In addition to CARSTRKGRU 10, Operation Brewing Storm also included Carrier Strike Group Two (CSG-2), led by the Theodore Roosevelt, the Spanish frigate Álvaro de Bazán, and the Peruvian submarine Antofagasta. Truman (CVN-75) and Carrier Air Wing 3 (CVW-3) also completed sustainment training 19 July under the U.S. Navy's Fleet Response Training Plan (FRTP) during Commander, U.S. 2nd Fleet's Joint Task Force Exercise (JTFEX 05-2), which included general quarters drills, strike warfare, close air support, and air defense.

=== USS Harry S. Truman maintenance cycle ===
USS Harry S. Truman (CVN-74) entered the Norfolk Naval Shipyard for a Docked Planned Incremental Availability overhaul in January 2006. The ship received many system upgrades, and underwent preventative maintenance to repair minor weld defects originating from the initial construction of the reactor plants. On 4 August 2006, the Truman left dry-dock and transited to Norfolk Naval Shipyard's Pier 5 to complete the last stages of its DPIA and continued preparations for its surge beginning in April 2007.

== 2007–2009 Operations ==
=== 2007–2008 MED deployment ===
Following humanitarian assistance and disaster response operation in the aftermath of Hurricane Katrina in September 2005, the Truman underwent an extended yard period at the Norfolk Naval Shipyard in Portsmouth, Virginia. On 5 November 2007, following the yard period and training exercises, Carrier Strike Group 10 departed Norfolk under the command Rear Admiral William E. Gortneyfor an extended deployment to the U.S. Fifth Fleet's area of responsibility (AOR). Carrier Strike Group 10 completed its seven-month overseas deployment, returning to Norfolk on 6 June 2008. The task group supported maritime security operations in the Mediterranean Sea and Persian Gulf as well as provided close air support for ground forces serving in Operation Iraqi Freedom.

==== Force composition ====
Units	CARSTRKGRU 10 Warships	Carrier Air Wing Three (CVW-3) squadrons embarked aboard flagship USS Harry S. Truman (CVN-75)	
#1	USS Hue City (CG-66)	Strike Fighter Squadron 105 (VFA-105): FA-18E Super Hornet	Tactical Electronics Warfare Squadron VAQ-130: EA-6B Prowler
#2	USS San Jacinto (CG-56)	Strike Fighter Squadron 37 (VFA-37): FA-18C(N) Hornet	Carrier Airborne Early Warning Squadron VAW-126: E-2C Hawkeye
#3	USS Winston S. Churchill (DDG-81)	Strike Fighter Squadron 32 (VFA-32): FA-18F Super Hornet	Helicopter Anti-Submarine Squadron 7 (HS-7): SH-60F/HH-60H Seahawk
#4	USS Oscar Austin (DDG-79)	Strike Fighter Squadron 11 (VFA-11): FA-18F Super Hornet	Fleet Logistics Support Squadron 40 (VRC-40), Det. 4: C-2A Greyhound
#5	USS Carney (DDG-64)	–	–
#6	HMS Manchester (D95)	–	–
#7	HMCS Charlottetown (FFH 339)	–	–
#8	USS Montpelier (SSN-765)	–	–
#9	USNS Arctic (T-AOE-8)	–	–
Notes			

==== Carrier air operations ====
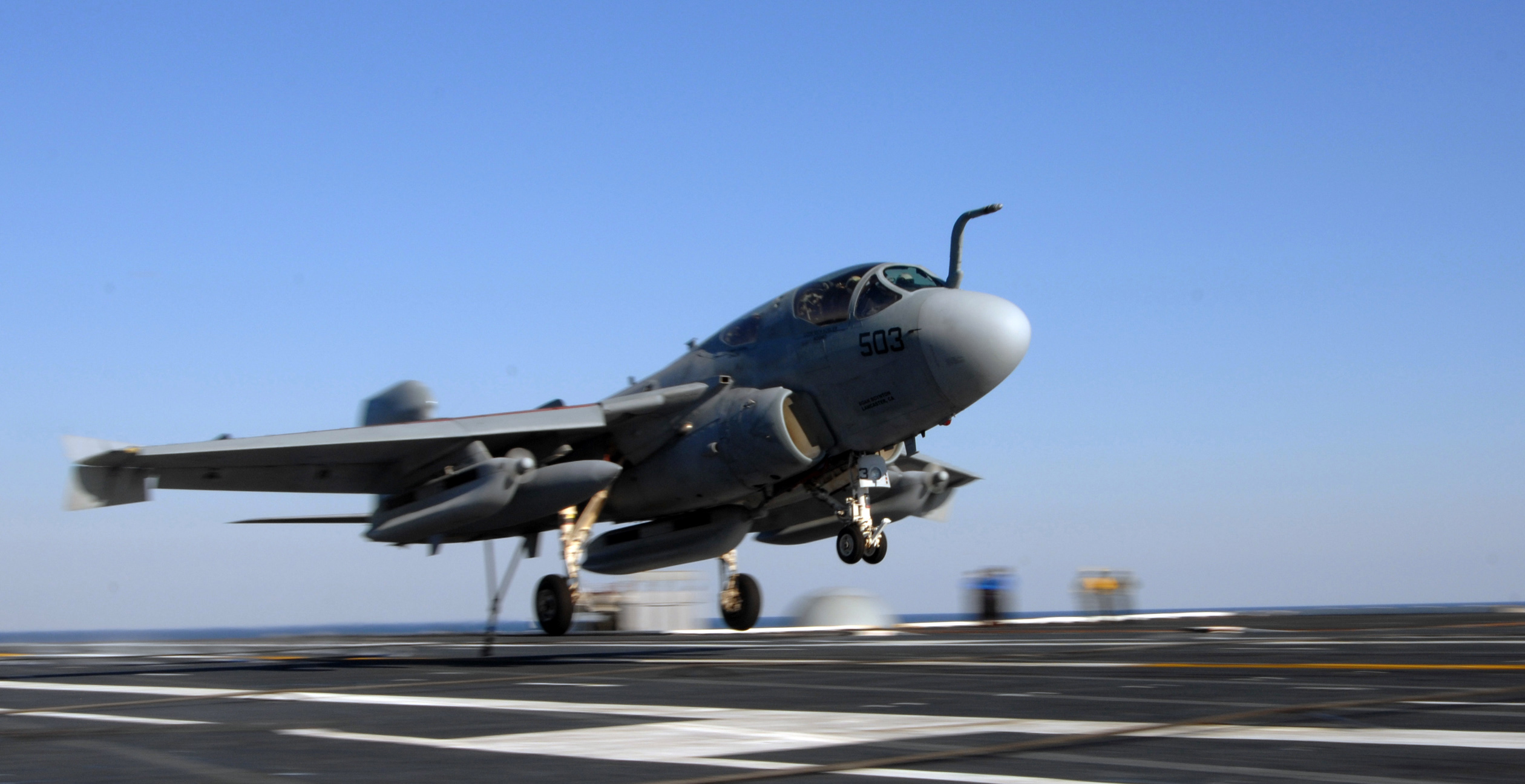
VAQ-130 EA-6B Prowler

Carrier Air Wing 3 (CVW-3) aircraft flew more than 26,500 hours during 9,500 sorties, including 2,459 combat sorties directly in support of coalition forces operating on the ground in Iraq. CVW-3 flew almost 14,000 combat hours and expended 77,500 pounds of ordnance during 228 troops-in-contact events, as well as providing defense to the Iraqi oil platforms. Additionally, the carrier air wing provided logistical support to the American Embassy in Lebanon. CVW-3 aircraft also carried out a variety of security cooperation exercises with five countries within the Sixth Fleet and Fifth Fleet areas of responsibilities to enhance allied cooperation and interoperability.

==== Maritime security operations ====
Surface warships of Destroyer Squadron 26 (DESRON-26) operated with over 50 coalition warships from 11 countries supporting combat operations in Iraq, carrying Maritime Security Operations (MSO) in the Persian Gulf, and conducting seven exercises throughout the Middle East. DESRON-26 warships made 1,021 approach-and-assist visits with local fishermen and merchants to encourage them to contact coalition warships as first responders against Persian Gulf piracy and smuggling. They also conducted visit, board, search, and seizures (VBSS) operations, searching for vessels that could support international terrorist organizations by transferring personnel, drugs, and weapons. Finally, DESRON-26 warships provided security patrols northern Persian Gulf to protect the vital Khor Al-Amaya and Al-Basra oil terminals from possible terrorist attacks.

=== USS Harry S. Truman maintenance cycle ===
USS Truman (CVN-75) completed sea trials following its nearly seven-month Planned Incremental Availability (PIA) at the Norfolk Naval Shipyard in Portsmouth, Virginia, on 14 February 2009. On 5 August 2009, EA-18G Growlers from Electronic Attack Squadron 129 (VAQ-129) and Electronic Attack Squadron 132 (VAQ-132) completed their first at-sea carrier-arrested landing (trap) aboard Harry S. Truman.
