= Mark Fox =

Mark Fox may refer to:

- Mark S. Fox (born 1952), Canadian computer scientist
- Mark I. Fox (born 1956), United States Navy officer
- Mark Fox (basketball) (born 1969), American basketball coach
- Mark Fox (footballer) (born 1975), English footballer

== See also ==
- Marcus Fox (disambiguation)
