= Carrier Strike Group 10 =

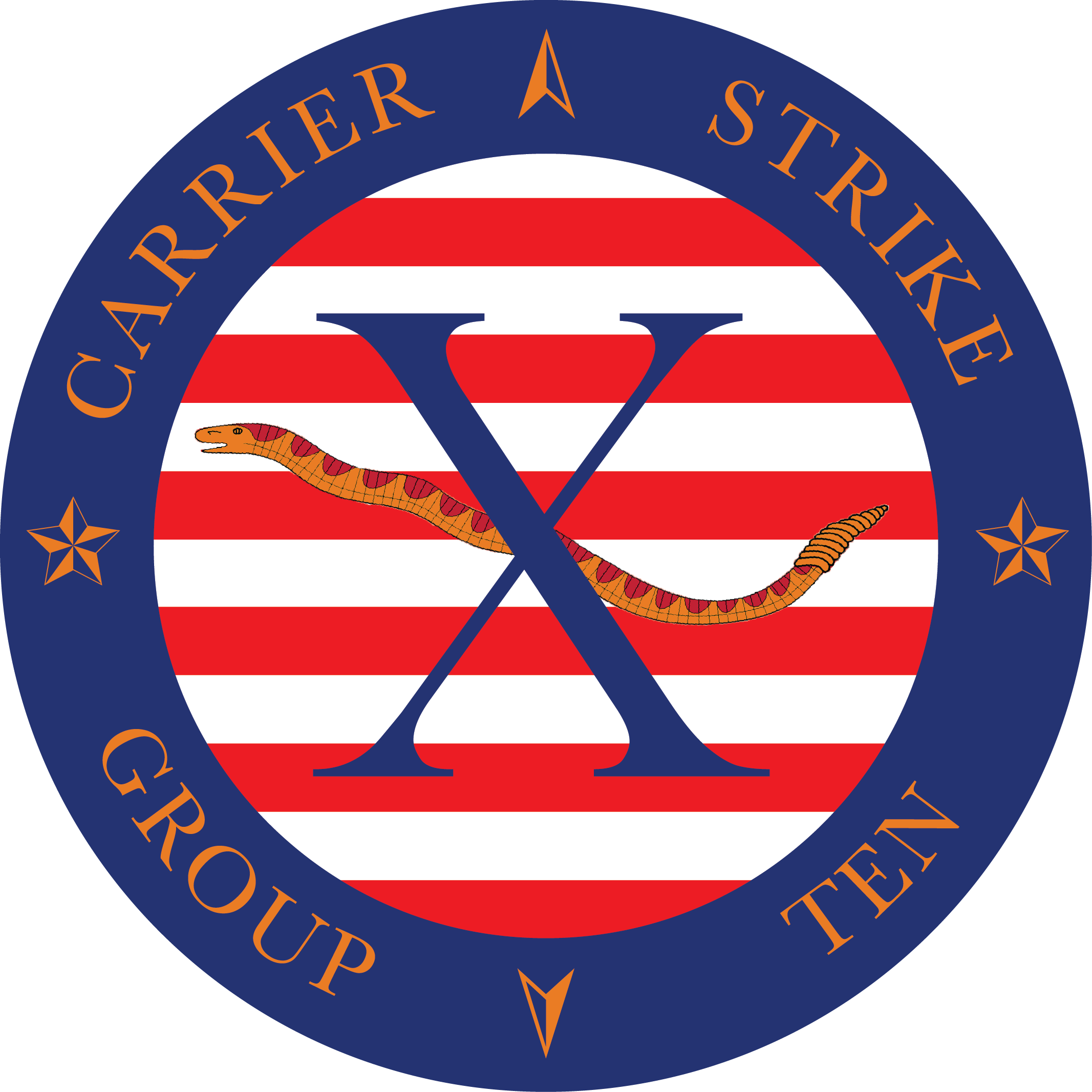
- Carrier Strike Group 10 crest
- Active: 1 October 2004 to date.
- Country: United States of America
- Branch: United States Navy
- Type: Carrier strike group
- Role: Naval air/surface warfare
- Part of: United States Fleet Forces Command
- Garrison/HQ: Naval Station Norfolk, Virginia
- Nickname: Bush Carrier Strike Group
- Engagements: Operation Enduring Freedom; Operation Iraqi Freedom; Operation Enduring Freedom – Afghanistan (OEF-A); Operation Vigilant Resolve

Commanders
- Commander: Rear Admiral (lower half) Alexis Walker, USN
- Chief of Staff: Captain Ron Withrow, USN
- Command Master Chief: Master Chief Pablo Rosado, USN
- Notable commanders: William E. Gortney; Mark I. Fox

Aircraft flown
- Electronic warfare: EA-18G Growler
- Fighter: F/A-18E/F Super Hornet
- Helicopter: MH-60R Seahawk; MH-60S Knighthawk
- Reconnaissance: E-2C Hawkeye
- Transport: CMV-22B Osprey

Carrier Strike Group 10 (abbreviated as CSG-10 or CARSTRKGRU 10), is a U.S. Navy carrier strike group. As of August 2022, CSG-10 consists of USS George H.W. Bush (CVN-77), the strike group's current flagship, with Carrier Air Wing Seven embarked on board, and ships of Destroyer Squadron 26. (Note: As of August 2022, the ships of Destroyer Squadron 26 deployed with CSG-10 were Arleigh Burke-class destroyers USS Nitze (DDG-94), USS Farragut (DDG-99), USS Truxtun (DDG-103), and USS Delbert D. Black (DDG-119).)

Through Cruiser-Destroyer Group 2 and Cruiser-Destroyer Flotilla 2, the group traces its history to the formation of Destroyer Flotilla 2 during the First World War. From the 1970s, the group has made scores of deployments to the Mediterranean and Middle East, usually led by a large-deck aircraft carrier. Between 2004 and 2014, the group made four deployments to the U.S. Fifth Fleet operating in the Persian Gulf and North Arabian Sea. The group's aircraft flew over 10,800 air combat missions in support of coalition ground forces in Iraq and Afghanistan. The group's surface warships were also involved in several high-profile anti-piracy and maritime security operations. The group participated in two major multi-lateral exercises, Operation Brewing Storm 2005 and Operation Bold Step 2007.

== Historical background ==
Carrier Strike Group 10's lineage can be traced to Destroyer Flotilla 2, which was established during the First World War at Naval Station Newport, Rhode Island. The Flotilla was deactivated in 1922 as part of fleet reductions after the war. Destroyer Flotilla 2 was reactivated in 1931 and served throughout the 1930s as a caretaker of reserve destroyers until again deactivated in the early days of World War II. As part of a Navy reorganization, the Flotilla was reactivated yet again in 1946. In 1973, Cruiser-Destroyer Flotilla 2 was renamed Cruiser-Destroyer Group 2, and it relocated to Charleston Navy Yard in South Carolina in 1974. Among its ships was USS Yosemite (AD-19), a destroyer tender.

Rear Admiral Samuel L. Gravely, Jr., the first African-American flag officer in the U.S. Navy, commanded Cruiser-Destroyer Group 2. Vice Admiral Henry C. Mustin, also commanded Cruiser-Destroyer Group 2. During his tenure as Commander Cruiser-Destroyer Group 2, Admiral Mustin was a pioneer in the tactical use of the Tomahawk cruise missile, and he was one of the first non-aviators to command a U.S. Navy carrier strike group.

In late June 1990, Rear Admiral Thomas D. Paulson, Commander Cruiser-Destroyer Group 2, led the cruiser USS Harry E. Yarnell (CG-17) and the frigate USS Kauffman (FFG-59) to visit Poland during BALTOPS '90, a U.S. Naval Forces Europe-hosted exercise in the Baltic Sea. Their port call at Gdynia was the first visit by United States Navy vessels to Poland since 1927.

USS America (CV-66) went to war during Operation Desert Storm as part of Cruiser-Destroyer Group 2.

In the middle of 1992, there was a U.S. Navy reorganization. The chart below shows Cruiser-Destroyer Group 2's units after the reorganization.

Cruiser-Destroyer Group 2, late 1992

| Cruisers/Submarines | Destroyer Squadron 26 | Carrier Air Wing 17 squadrons embarked aboard USS George Washington (CVN-73) | |
|---|---|---|---|
| USS Hue City (CG-66) | USS Kidd (DDG-993) | Fighter Squadron 103: F-14B | Airborne Early Warning Squadron 125: E-2C |
| USS San Jacinto (CG-56) | USS Deyo (DD-989) | Fighter Squadron 74: F-14B | Sea Control Squadron 30: S-3B |
| USS Bainbridge (CGN-25) | USS Spruance (DD-963) | Strike Fighter Squadron 83: F/A-18C | Helicopter Anti-Submarine Squadron 9: SH-3H |
| USS Harry E. Yarnell (CG-17) | USS Carr (FFG-52) | Strike Fighter Squadron 81: F/A-18C | —— |
| USS Hyman G. Rickover (SSN-709) | USS DeWert (FFG-45) | Attack Squadron 35: A-7E | —— |
| USS Bergall (SSN-667) | USS Doyle (FFG-39) | Airborne Early Warning Squadron 132: EA-6B | —— |

In 1993, following a fleet reorganization, the group staff went aboard a new flagship, the new Nimitz class aircraft carrier USS George Washington (CVN-73). The group participated in the 2000 NATO Exercise Destined Glory, Operation Joint Endeavor, Operation Deny Flight, Operation Southern Watch, and Operation Vigilant Resolve. After 2001 the group took part in Operation Enduring Freedom and Operation Iraqi Freedom. In 1997 Commander Cruiser-Destroyer Group 2, Rear Admiral Michael Mullen, led the group on deployment from George Washington.

On 1 October 2004, Cruiser-Destroyer Group 2 was redesignated as Carrier Strike Group 10. Subsequently, George Washington was relieved as the flagship by the nuclear-powered aircraft carrier USS Harry S. Truman (CVN-75).

== Structure ==
=== Commanders ===
The strike group commander is responsible for unit-level training, integrated training, and material readiness for the ships and aviation squadrons assigned to the group. When not deployed, the strike group is part of the U.S. Fleet Forces Command, and its commander reports to Commander Task Force 80, the director of Fleet Forces' Maritime Headquarters. Carrier Strike Group 10 is designated Task Group 80.4. When deployed overseas, the group comes under command of the numbered fleet (Third, Fourth, Fifth, Sixth, or Seventh) in whose area it is operating, and will have a task force or task group designator, for example, Task Group 50.1 in the Fifth Fleet area.

Group commanders since May 2004 have included:

• Rear Admiral Michael C. Tracy

(May 2004 – April 2005)
• Rear Admiral Joseph F. Kilkenny

(April 2005 – July 2006)
• Rear Admiral William E. Gortney

(July 2006 – April 2008)
• Rear Admiral Mark I. Fox

(April 2008 – May 2009)
• Rear Admiral Patrick Driscoll

(May 2009 – March 2011)
• Rear Admiral Herman Shelanski

(March 2011 – August 2012)
• Rear Admiral Kevin M. Sweeney

(August 2012 – August 2014)
• Rear Admiral Bruce Lindsey

(August 2014 – November 2015)
- Rear Admiral Jesse A. Wilson Jr.

(November 2015 – September 2016)
- Rear Admiral James J. Malloy

(September 2016 – July 2017)
- Rear Admiral Samuel Paparo

(July 2017 – March 2018)
- Rear Admiral John F. Meier

(March 2018 – June 2019)
- Rear Admiral Paul J. Schlise

(June 2019 – May 2020)
- Rear Admiral Brendan R. McLane

(May 2020 – December 2020)
- Rear Admiral Richard J. Cheeseman

(December 2020 – April 2022)
- Rear Admiral Dennis Velez

(April 2022 – May 2023)
- Rear Admiral Robert D. Westendorff

(May 2023 – March 2025)
- Rear Admiral Alexis T. Walker

(March 2025 – Present)

=== Composition ===
The current composition of the strike group includes:

- USS San Jacinto (CG-56)
- USS Monterey (CG-61)
- USS Vella Gulf (CG-72)
- Destroyer Squadron 26, at Naval Station Norfolk
  - USS Stout (DDG-55)
  - USS McFaul (DDG-74)
  - USS Oscar Austin (DDG-79)
  - USS Truxtun (DDG-103)
  - USS James E. Williams (DDG-95)
- USS Dwight D. Eisenhower (CV-69) – Flagship
  - Carrier Air Wing Three
    - Strike Fighter Squadron 105 'Gunslingers' – McDonnell Douglas F/A-18 Hornet
    - Strike Fighter Squadron 131 'Wildcats' – McDonnell Douglas F/A-18 Hornet
    - Strike Fighter Squadron 32 'Swordsmen' – McDonnell Douglas F/A-18 Hornet
    - Strike Fighter Squadron 83 'Rampagers' – McDonnell Douglas F/A-18 Hornet
    - Electronic Attack Squadron 130 'Zappers' – Boeing EA-18G Growler
    - Airborne Early Warning Squadron 123 'Screwtops' – Northrop Grumman E-2 Hawkeye
    - Helicopter Sea Combat Squadron 7 'Dusty Dogs' – Sikorsky SH-60 Seahawk
    - Helicopter Strike Maritime Squadron 74 'Swamp Foxes' – Sikorsky SH-60 Seahawk

== Operational history ==
=== 2004–2005 deployment ===
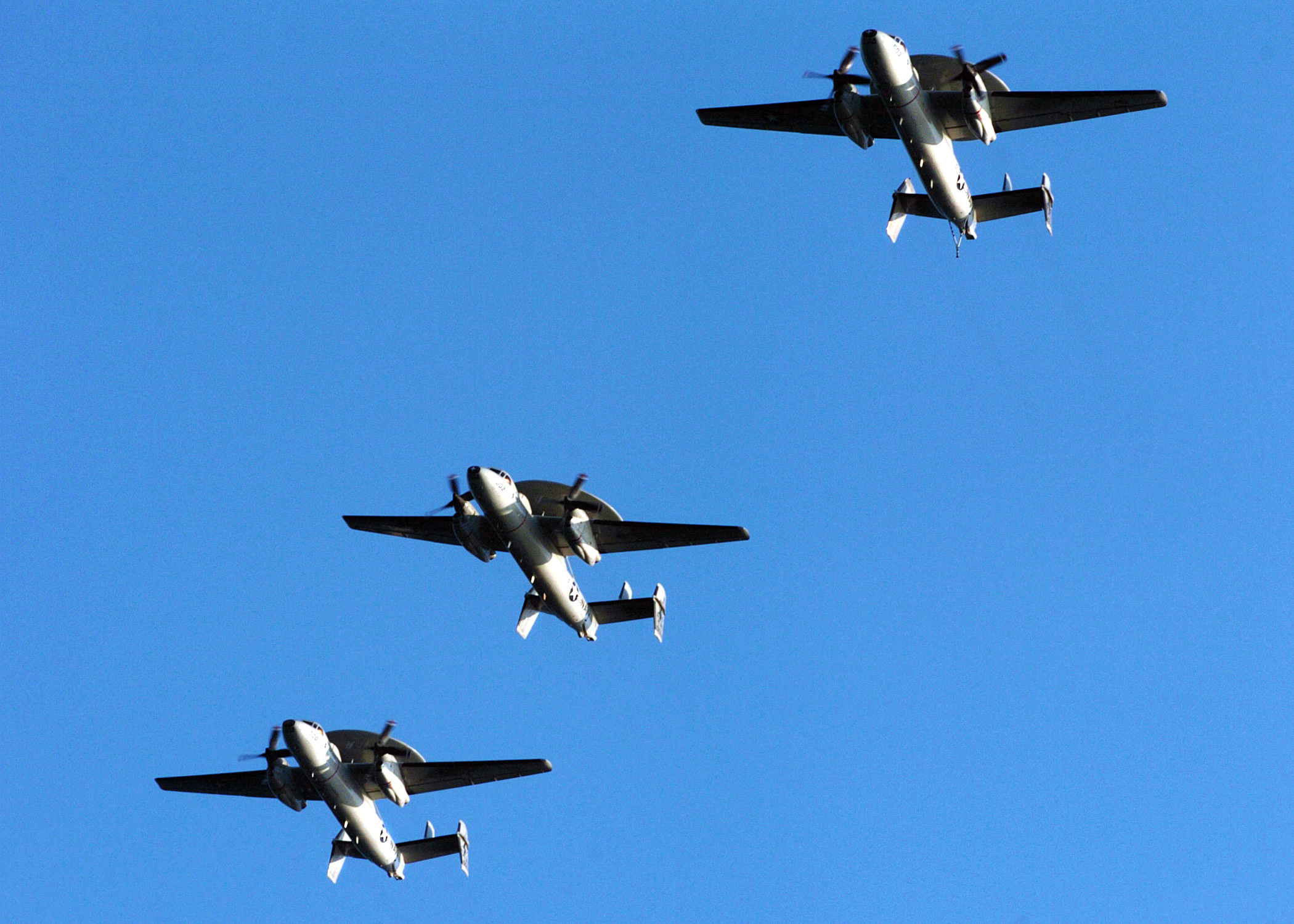
E-2C Hawkeyes from squadron VAW-126 (10 December 2004)

Carrier Strike Group Ten departed Norfolk on 13 October 2004 for an extended deployment under the command of Rear Admiral Michael C. Tracy. The strike group participated in the Joint Maritime Course north of Scotland between 25 and 28 October 2004 which included multi-national strike, surface, and submarine warfare exercises. The strike group transited the Suez Canal on 11 November 2004, joining the U.S. Fifth Fleet, and relieved Carrier Strike Group Four, led by USS John F. Kennedy, on 20 November 2004.

Truman and Carrier Air Wing Three launched 2,577 sorties, totaling nearly 13,000 flight hours, in support of Operation Iraqi Freedom and maritime security operations being relieved by the Carrier Strike Group One in the Persian Gulf on 19 March 2005. One major air operation involved a VAW-126 detachment of two E-2C Hawkeyes that operated out of Kandahar International Airport in southern Afghanistan, from 4–13 December 2004. The detachment's mission was to provide airborne command and control for the inauguration of President of Afghanistan Hamid Karzai. This event was attended by an entourage led by U.S. Vice President Richard B. Cheney and Secretary of Defense Donald H. Rumsfeld.

Despite plans to cross the equator and visited South Africa, diplomatic issues caused the strike group to transit the Suez Canal, stopping in Portsmouth, England, prior to returning to the United States on 19 April 2005.

2004–2005 deployment force composition

| CARSTRKGRU X Warships | Carrier Air Wing Three (CVW-3) squadrons embarked aboard flagship USS Harry S. Truman (CVN-75) | |
|---|---|---|
| USS Monterey (CG-61) | Marine Fighter Attack Squadron 115 (VMFA-115): 12 FA-18A+ | Helicopter Anti-Submarine Squadron 7 (HS-7): 3 HH-60S & 4 SH-60S |
| USS Mason (DDG-87) | Strike Fighter Squadron 105 (VFA-105): 12 FA-18C(N) | Fleet Logistics Support Squadron 40 (VRC-40), Det. 4: 2 C-2A |
| USS Barry (DDG-52) | Strike Fighter Squadron 37 (VFA-37): 10 FA-18C(N) | Helicopter Antisubmarine Squadron Light 46 (HSL-46) |
| USS Albuquerque (SSN-706) | Fighter Squadron 32 (VF-32): 10 F-14B | HSL-46 Det 3: 2 SH-60B – USS Monterey |
| USNS Arctic (T-AOE-8) | Tactical Electronics Warfare Squadron 130 (VAQ-130): 4 EA-6B | HSL-46 Det 8: 2 SH-60B – USS Mason |
| —— | Carrier Airborne Early Warning Squadron (VAW-126): 4 E-2C | —— |

2004–2005 deployment exercises and port visits

| Number | Regional Exercises | | | | Port Visits | | Notes |
| Number | Duration | U.S. Force | Bilateral/Multilateral Partner(s) | Operating Area | Location | Dates | Notes |
|---|---|---|---|---|---|---|---|
| 1st: | 25–28 Oct 2004 | Carrier Strike Group 10 | Joint Maritime Course (JMC-043) | Eastern Atlantic | Souda Bay, Crete | 5–8 Nov 2004 | |
| 2nd: | —— | —— | —— | —— | Bahrain | 13–18 Dec 2004 | |
| 3rd: | —— | —— | —— | —— | Portsmouth, England | 4 April 2005 | |

=== Preparation exercises, 2005 and 2007 ===
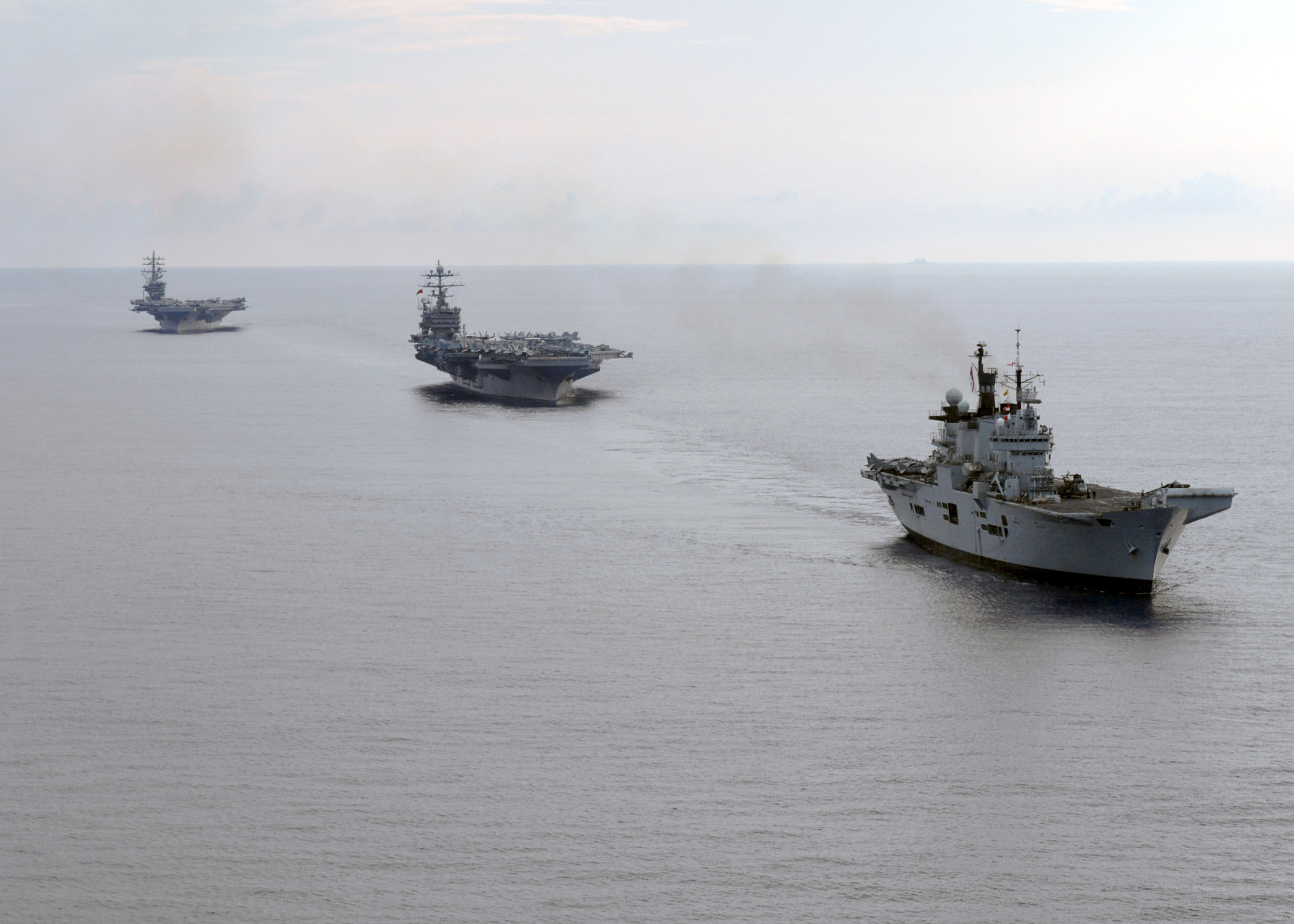
Three carriers in company during JTFEX 07-2, 29 July 2007

Code-named Operation Brewing Storm, Joint Task Force Exercise 05-2 (JTFEX 05-2) was held between 14 and 22 July 2005, and it involved Carrier Strike Group Ten, Carrier Strike Group 2, the Spanish frigate Álvaro de Bazán, and the Peruvian submarine Antofagasta. Truman and Carrier Air Wing Three also completed sustainment training 19 July 2005 in accordance with the U.S. Navy's Fleet Response Training Plan (FRTP), which included general quarters drills, strike warfare, close air support, and air defense operations. Following humanitarian assistance and disaster response operations in the aftermath of Hurricane Katrina in September 2005, Truman underwent an extended yard period at the Norfolk Naval Shipyard in Portsmouth, Virginia.

In 2007, the strike group's final preparation for deployment was Joint Task Force Exercise 07-2 (JTFEX 07-2). JTFEX 07-2 involved 30 ships and more than 15,000 personnel from five different navies led by the aircraft carriers USS Dwight D. Eisenhower, USS Harry S. Truman, and HMS Illustrious (pictured). It took place between 26 and 31 August 2007 off the coast of North Carolina and Florida.

=== 2007–2008 deployment ===
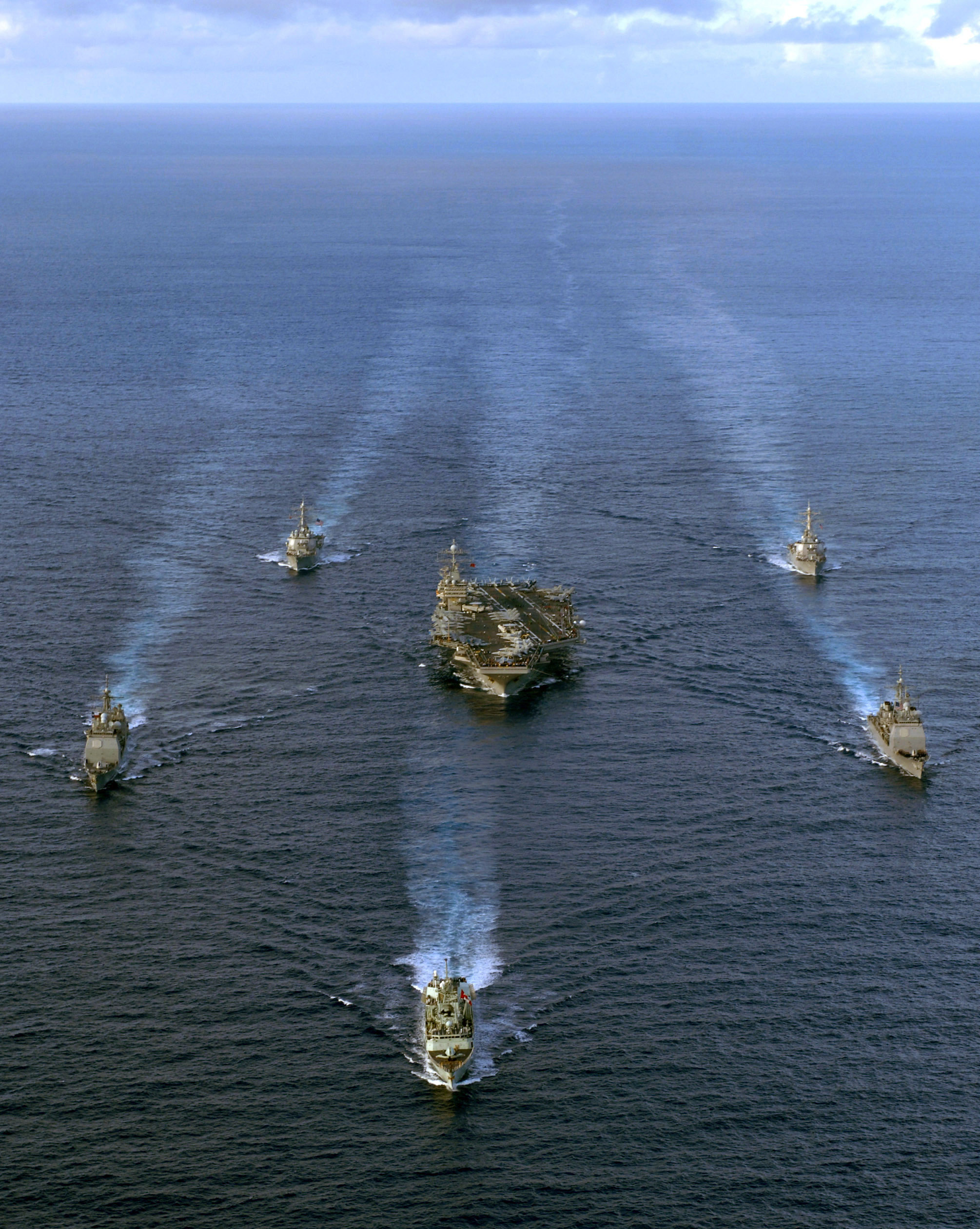
The group performs a multi-ship maneuvering exercise in November 2007

On 5 November 2007, the group departed Norfolk under the command of Rear Admiral William E. Gortney for its 2007–2008 deployment.

Carrier Air Wing Three aircraft flew more than 26,500 hours during 9,500 sorties, including 2,459 combat sorties directly in support of coalition forces operating on the ground in Iraq. This included flying almost 14,000 combat hours and expended 77,500 pounds of ordnance during 228 troops-in-contact events, as well as providing defense to the Iraqi oil platforms. Additionally, the carrier air wing provided logistical support to the American Embassy in Lebanon. The air wing's aircraft also carried out a variety of security cooperation exercises with five countries within the Sixth Fleet and Fifth Fleet areas to enhance allied cooperation and interoperability.

Surface warships of Destroyer Squadron 26 operated with over 50 coalition warships from 11 countries supporting combat operations in Iraq, carrying maritime security operations in the Persian Gulf, and conducting seven exercises throughout the Middle East. The squadron's warships made 1,021 approach-and-assist visits with local fishermen and merchants to encourage them to contact coalition warships as first responders against Persian Gulf piracy and smuggling. They also conducted Visit, Board, Search, and Seizure (VBSS) operations, searching for vessels that could support international terrorist organizations by transferring personnel, drugs, and weapons. Finally, Destroyer Squadron 26 provided security patrols in the northern Persian Gulf to protect the vital Khor Al-Amaya and Al-Basra oil terminals from possible terrorist attacks.

Carrier Strike Group 10 completed its 2007–2008 deployment on 6 June 2008.

2007–2008 deployment force composition

| CARSTRKGRU 10 Warships | | Carrier Air Wing Three (CVW-3) squadrons embarked aboard flagship USS Harry S. Truman (CVN-75) | |
|---|---|---|---|
| USS Hue City (CG-66) | HMS Manchester (D95) | Strike Fighter Squadron 105 (VFA-105): FA-18E | Tactical Electronics Warfare Squadron VAQ-130: EA-6B |
| USS San Jacinto (CG-56) | HMCS Charlottetown (FFH 339) | Strike Fighter Squadron 37 (VFA-37): FA-18C(N) | Carrier Airborne Early Warning Squadron VAW-126: E-2C |
| USS Winston S. Churchill (DDG-81) | USS Montpelier (SSN-765) | Strike Fighter Squadron 32 (VFA-32): FA-18F | Helicopter Anti-Submarine Squadron 7 (HS-7): SH-60F/HH-60H |
| USS Oscar Austin (DDG-79) | USNS Arctic (T-AOE-8) | Strike Fighter Squadron 11 (VFA-11): FA-18F | Fleet Logistics Support Squadron 40 (VRC-40), Det. 4: C-2A |
| USS Carney (DDG-64) | —— | —— | —— |

2007–2008 deployment exercises and port visits

| Number | Regional Exercises | | | | Port Visits | | Notes |
| Number | Duration | U.S. Force | Bilateral/Multilateral Partner(s) | Operating Area | Location | Dates | Notes |
|---|---|---|---|---|---|---|---|
| 1st: | —— | Oscar Austin | —— | —— | Palermo, Italy | 20 November 2007 | |
| 2nd: | —— | Truman, Hue City | —— | —— | Naples, Italy | 20–26 Nov 2007 | |
| 3rd: | —— | Hue City, Carney | —— | —— | Manama, Bahrain | 23 December 2007 | |
| 4th: | —— | Truman | —— | —— | Jebel Ali, UAE | 24–28 Dec 2007 | |
| 5th: | —— | San Jacinto | —— | —— | Naples, Italy | 9 January 2008 | |
| 6th: | —— | Carney | —— | —— | Souda Bay, Crete | 20 January 2008 | |
| 7th: | —— | Truman | —— | —— | Jebel Ali, UAE | 25 January 2008 | |
| 8th: | —— | San Jacinto | —— | —— | Souda Bay, Crete | 28 January 2008 | |
| 9th: | —— | San Jacinto | —— | —— | Varna, Bulgaria | 28 February 2008 | |
| 10th | —— | San Jacinto | —— | —— | Istanbul, Turkey | 8 March 2008 | |
| 11th | —— | San Jacinto | —— | —— | Souda Bay, Crete | 14 March 2008 | |
| 12th: | 15–17 Apr 2008 | Carney | Exercise Arabian Shark: Combined Task Force 152 | Arabian Sea | —— | —— | |
| 13th: | —— | Truman | —— | —— | Rhodes, Greece | 7 May 2008 | |

=== 2010 deployment ===
On 21 May 2010, Carrier Strike Group 10 deployed for its 2010 deployment under the command of Rear Admiral Patrick Driscoll. During the seven-month deployment, the strike group flew 2,915 missions into Afghanistan and Iraq, delivering 35,000 pounds (15,876 kg) of ordnance in support of Operations Enduring Freedom and Operation New Dawn, providing surge support for coalition forces in Afghanistan, and to support existing maritime security operations in the Persian Gulf. Detachments from helicopter squadron HSL-44 based on board the destroyers Oscar Austin and Winston S. Churchill flew a combined 1,875 hours in support of anti-piracy operations, multinational training events, and counter-smuggling missions in the Gulf of Aden and Indian Ocean.

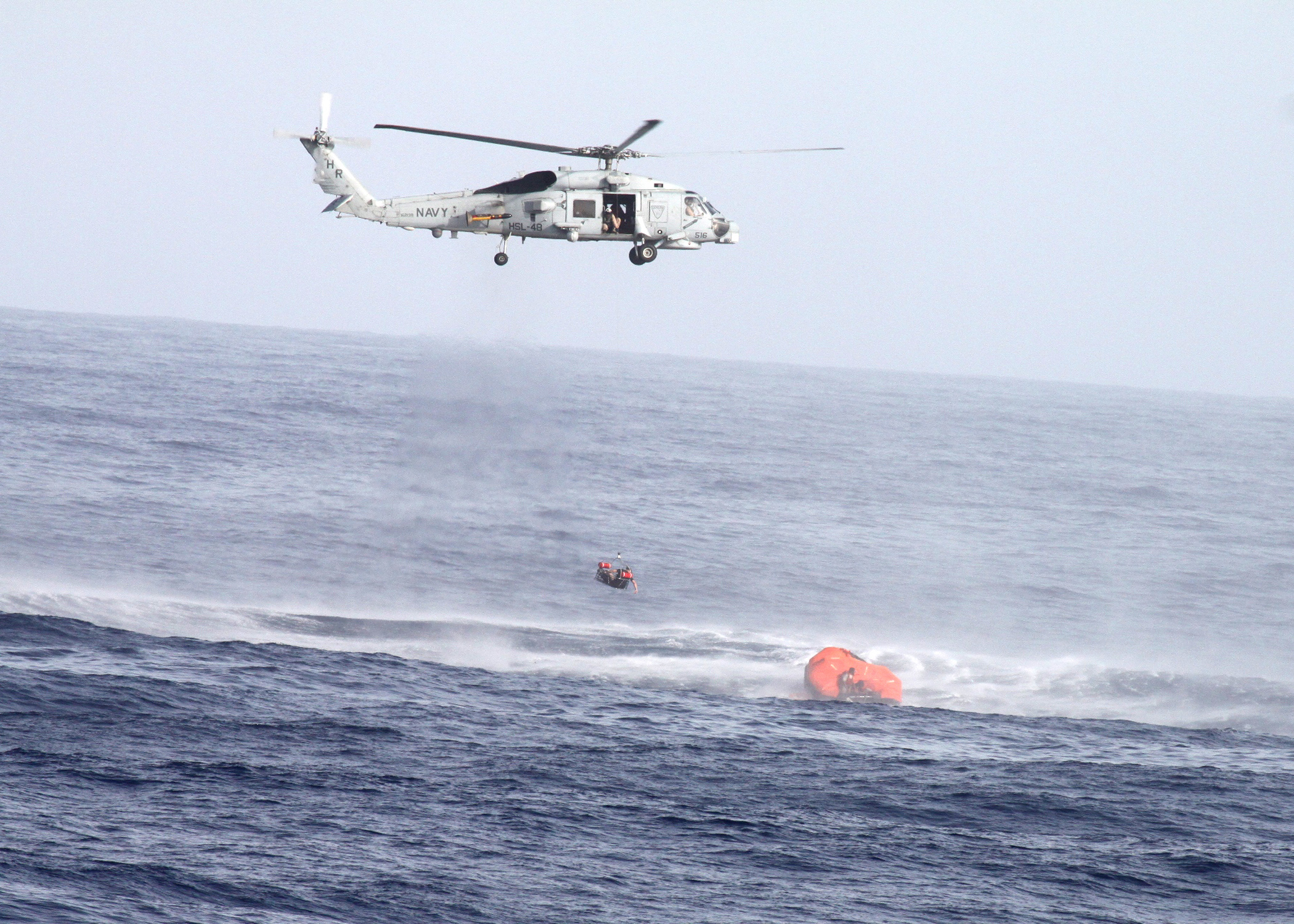
Rescue of Pakistani fishermen (6 July 2010)

Normandy served as the naval Regional Air Defense Commander (RADC) during the deployment, providing surveillance of more than 264 million square miles (683.8 million km^{2}) of air space. On 5 July 2010, the guided-missile frigate Elrod assisted 16 stranded Pakistani fishermen (pictured) whose boat had taken on water and sank two days earlier. After being spotted floating adrift in a life raft by a Task Force 57 Lockheed P-3 Orion, the stranded crew was recovered by the Elrod's rigid-hulled inflatable boat before being transferred to the Pakistani Navy frigate PNS Babur on 6 July 2010. On 18 November 2010, guided-missile destroyer Oscar Austin located and provided assistance to two Iranian mariners who were spotted floating in a life raft in the Persian Gulf. Oscar Austin was operating with Combined Task Force 152, and the two mariners were picked up by an Iranian rescue vessel.

On 15 November 2010, four Sikorsky CH-53E Super Stallion helicopters from squadron VMM-266 landed and re-fueled on board the carrier Harry S. Truman following operations in Afghanistan and Pakistan. These VMM-266 helicopters part of the 26th Marine Expeditionary Unit, and they were returning to the amphibious assault ship Kearsarge after completing humanitarian relief efforts in Pakistan. Because of the distance between Pakistan and Kearsarge, Truman acted as an intermediate refueling point.

Carrier Strike Group 10 returned to Naval Station Norfolk on 20 December 2010, completing its six-month deployment.

2010 deployment force composition

| CARSTRKGRU 10 Warships | | Carrier Air Wing Three (CVW-3) squadrons embarked aboard flagship USS Harry S. Truman (CVN-75) | |
|---|---|---|---|
| USS Hue City (CG-66) | USS Carney (DDG-64) | Strike Fighter Squadron 105 (VFA-105): FA-18E | Tactical Electronics Warfare Squadron VAQ-130: EA-6B |
| USS San Jacinto (CG-56) | HMS Manchester (D95) | Strike Fighter Squadron 37 (VFA-37): FA-18C(N) | Carrier Airborne Early Warning Squadron VAW-126: E-2C |
| USS Winston S. Churchill (DDG-81) | HMCS Charlottetown (FFH 339) | Strike Fighter Squadron 32 (VFA-32): FA-18F | Helicopter Anti-Submarine Squadron 7 (HS-7): SH-60F/HH-60H |
| USS Oscar Austin (DDG-79) | USS Montpelier (SSN-765) | Strike Fighter Squadron 11 (VFA-11): FA-18F | Fleet Logistics Support Squadron 40 (VRC-40), Det. 4: C-2A |
| USS Ross (DDG-71) | USNS Arctic (T-AOE-8) | —— | —— |

2010 deployment exercises and port visits

| Number | Regional exercises/combined operations | | | | Port visits | | Notes |
| Number | Duration | U.S. force | Bilateral/multilateral partner(s) | Operating area | Location | Dates | Notes |
|---|---|---|---|---|---|---|---|
| 1st: | —— | Winston S. Churchill | —— | —— | Portsmouth, England | 3–7 June | |
| 2nd: | 4–7 June | Carrier Strike Group 10 | French Navy Task Force 473 | Mediterranean Sea | Marseille, France | 8–11 June | |
| 3rd: | —— | Oscar Austin | —— | —— | Constanta, Romania | 8–10 June | |
| 4th: | 10 June | Ross | VBSS exercise: Croatian Navy | Adriatic Sea | Split, Croatia | 10 June | |
| 5th: | 7–9 July | Harry S. Truman, Winston S. Churchill | FS Jean Bart (D615) | Arabian Sea | —— | —— | |
| 6th: | —— | Carrier Strike Group 10 | —— | —— | Jebel Ali, U.A.E | 7–10 August | |
| 7th: | —— | Carrier Strike Group 10 | —— | —— | Jebel Ali, U.A.E | 10 September | |
| 8th: | —— | Carrier Strike Group 10 | —— | —— | Bahrain | 29 October – 1 November | |
| 9th: | —— | Carrier Strike Group 10 | —— | —— | Souda Bay, Crete | 3–6 December | |
| 10th: | —— | Ross | —— | —— | Istanbul, Turkey | 3–6 December | |

=== 2011–2013 operations ===
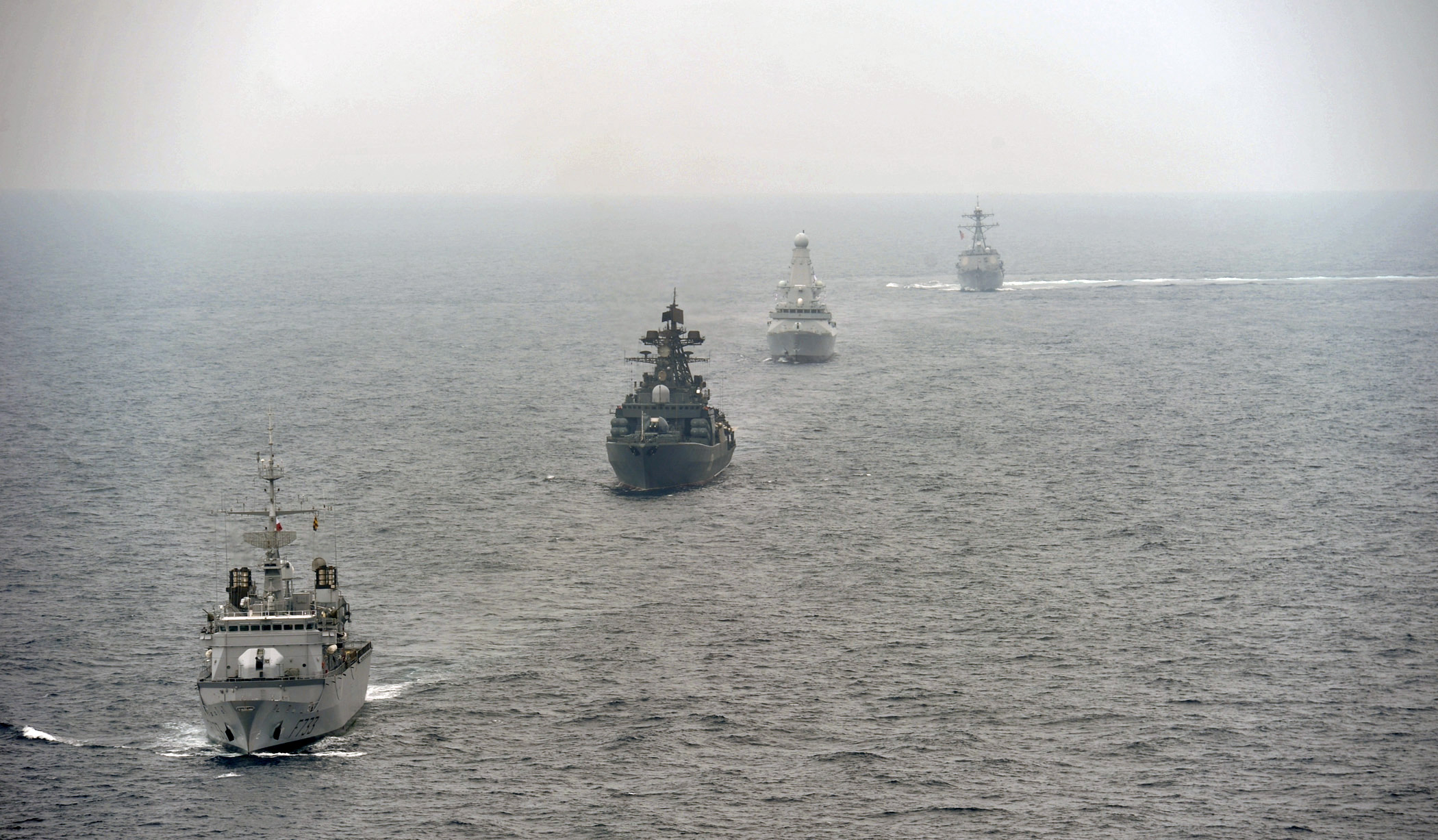
FRUKUS 2011 (29 June 2011)

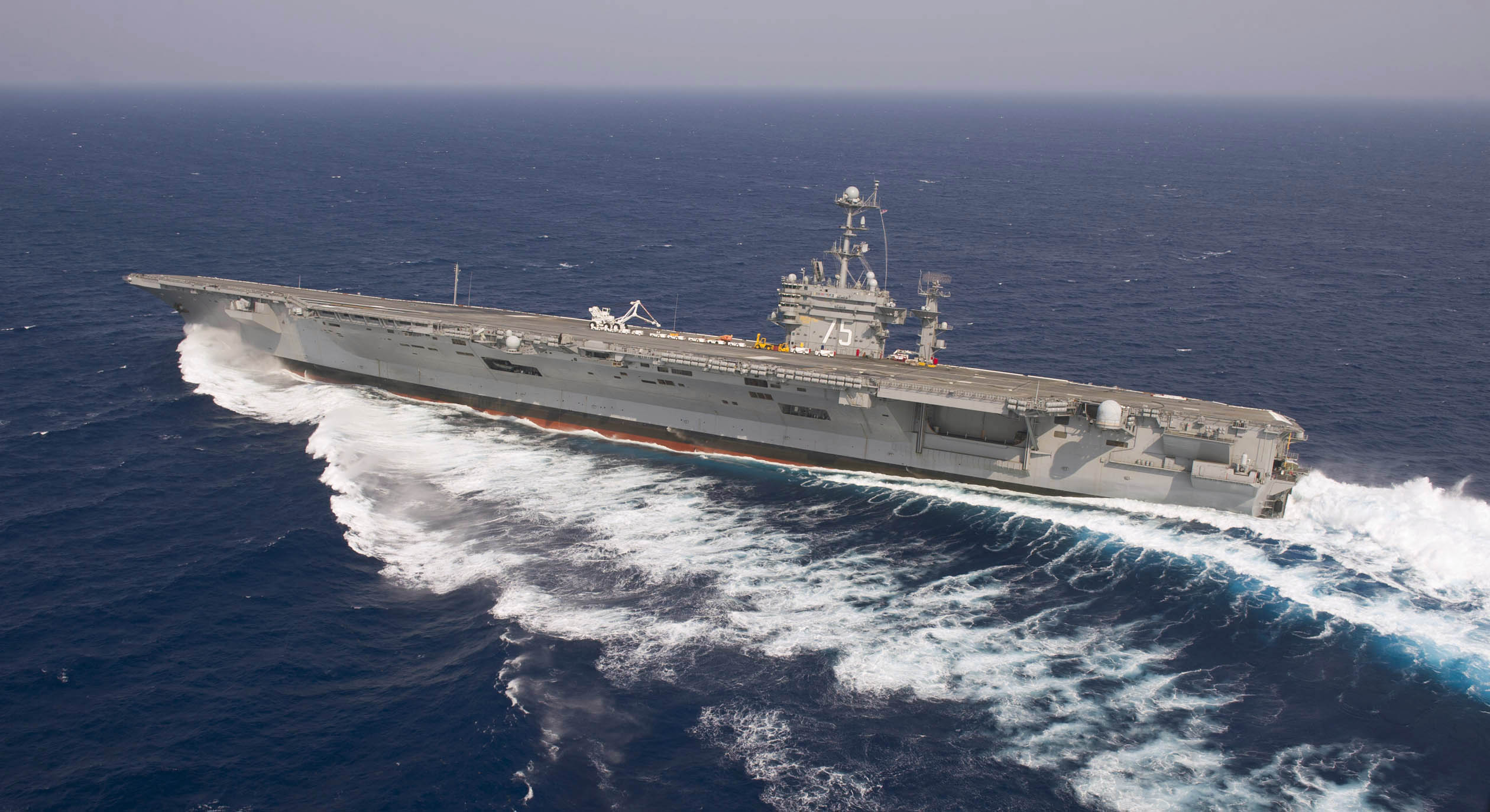
Sea trials (9 July 2012)

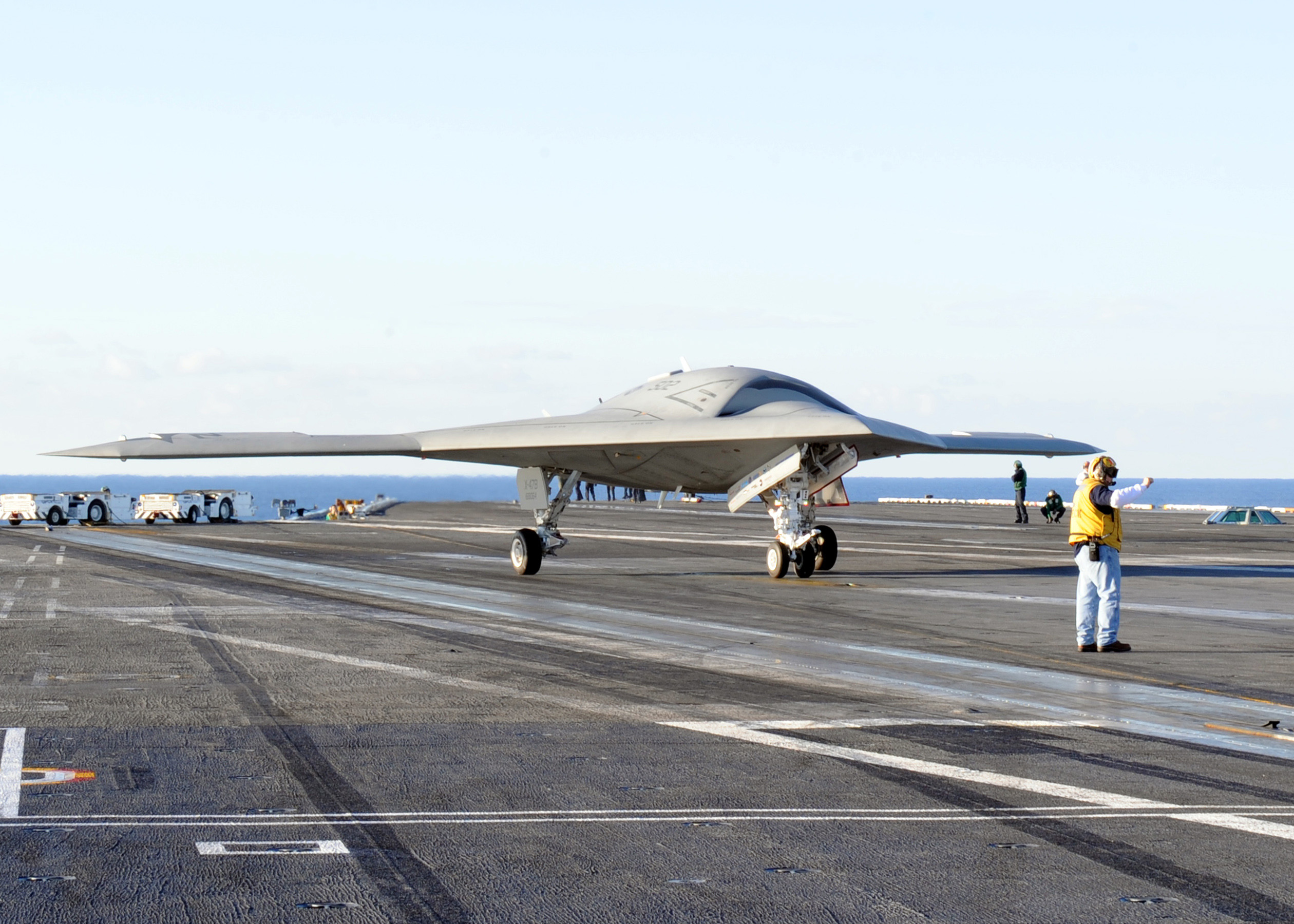
X-47B at-sea trials (9 December 2012)

Sustainment exercise (10 June 2013)

Exercise FRUKUS 2011, involving France, Russia, the United Kingdom, and the United States, began off the coast of Virginia on 20 June 2011. It was a two-week exercise to improve the navies' maritime security operations capabilities. Involved in the exercise were the carrier strike group, Destroyer Squadron 26, the U.S. destroyer James E. Williams, the French frigate French frigate Ventôse, the Russian Udaloy-class destroyer Admiral Chabanenko, and the British destroyer Dauntless. The exercise consisted of two phases, ashore and at-sea. The week-long ashore phase included damage control, fire fighting, and ship handling exercises. The at-sea phase (pictured) occurred during the second week, between 27 June and 1 July, and included maritime domain awareness training, anti-piracy operations, and maritime interdiction operations. A multi-national task group staff ashore provided command and control.

Between 31 July and 2 August 2011, Destroyer Squadron 26 participated in a passing exercise with Japan Maritime Self Defense Force ships off the east coast of the United States. Passing exercises are designed to provide realistic training environments that closely replicates the operational challenges routinely encountered around the world. The destroyer squadron worked in close coordination with the JMSDF Training Squadron which consists of newly commissioned Japanese surface warfare officers. U.S. naval units participating were Carrier Strike Group 10, Destroyer Squadron 26, the guided-missile cruiser Vicksburg, the guided-missile destroyer Nitze, and the guided-missile frigate Taylor. The JMSDF Training Squadron consisted of the destroyer Mineyuki, the training vessel Asagiri, and the training vessel Kashima.

Between 19 and 29 June 2012, the group staff participated in War of 1812 Commemoration Fleet Exercise, or 1812 FleetEx, with Rear Admiral Herman Shelanski embarked on the helicopter carrier Wasp. It involved 19 warships from the United States, Brazil, the United Kingdom, Norway, Germany, Portugal, Denmark, and Canada under the command of Rear Admiral Scott Craig, the Commander Strike Force Training Atlantic. The 1812 FleetEx also served as the summer cruise for over 60 midshipmen from the United States Naval Academy.

On 7 July 2012, Harry S. Truman departed Norfolk Naval Shipyard, Virginia, for sea trials (pictured) following its 16-month-long docking planned incremental availability overhaul. Harry S. Truman completed its sea trials on 10 July 2012, signaling the conclusion of Truman's overhaul period and the start of its pre-deployment training cycle, beginning with carrier qualifications on 3 August 2012.

On 24 October 2012, Harry S. Truman completed its tailored ship's training availability (TSTA) period. as well as successfully its final evaluation problem (FEP) assessment, following a 24-day underway period. Carrier Air Wing Three underwent advanced training at Naval Air Station, Nevada, between 12 November to 21 December 2012 while the Truman performed carrier-based evaluation of the X-47B Unmanned Combat Air System between 26 November and 18 December 2012 (pictured).

On 14 January 2013, the strike group began its Composite Training Unit Exercise in order to undertake a surge deployment to the U.S. Fifth Fleet, two months ahead of its previously scheduled departure date. One unit of Carrier Strike Group Ten not part of this surge deployment was the guided-missile cruiser San Jacinto which was undergoing repairs following a collision with the nuclear-powered attack submarine Montpelier on 13 October 2012 during training exercises off the coast of Florida. Joining the strike group were the Canadian frigate Ville de Québec and replenishment oiler Preserver, as well as the German frigate Hamburg. On 3 February 2013, the group completed its Composite Training Unit Exercise and returned to its homeports. It was also announced that the Ticonderoga-class guided-missile cruiser Gettysburg and the German frigate Hamburg would join the strike group for its upcoming 2013 deployment.

On 6 February 2013, the planned deployment of the strike group was postponed, pending the resolution of the upcoming U.S. budget sequestration, leaving Carrier Strike Group Three led by John C. Stennis as the only carrier force in the Persian Gulf region. Carrier Strike Group Ten was originally scheduled to depart Naval Station Norfolk, Virginia, on 8 February 2013.

On 5 June 2013, Carrier Strike Group 10 was underway to begin its final sustainment exercise (pictured) prior to its upcoming deployment, completing this exercise on 17 June 2013.

=== 2013–2014 deployment ===
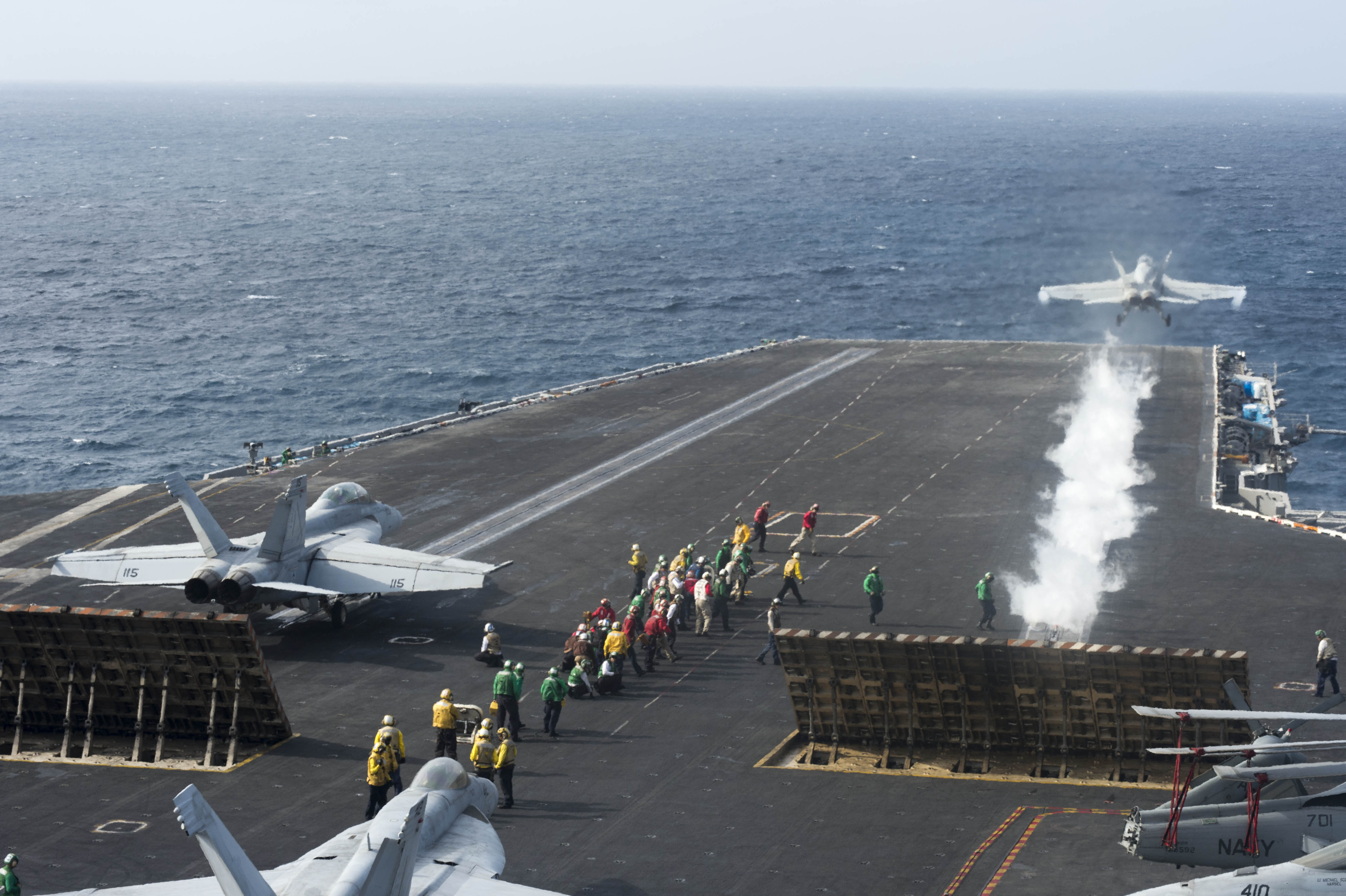
A F/A-18F Super Hornet launches from the Truman in the Arabian Sea on 27 August 2013

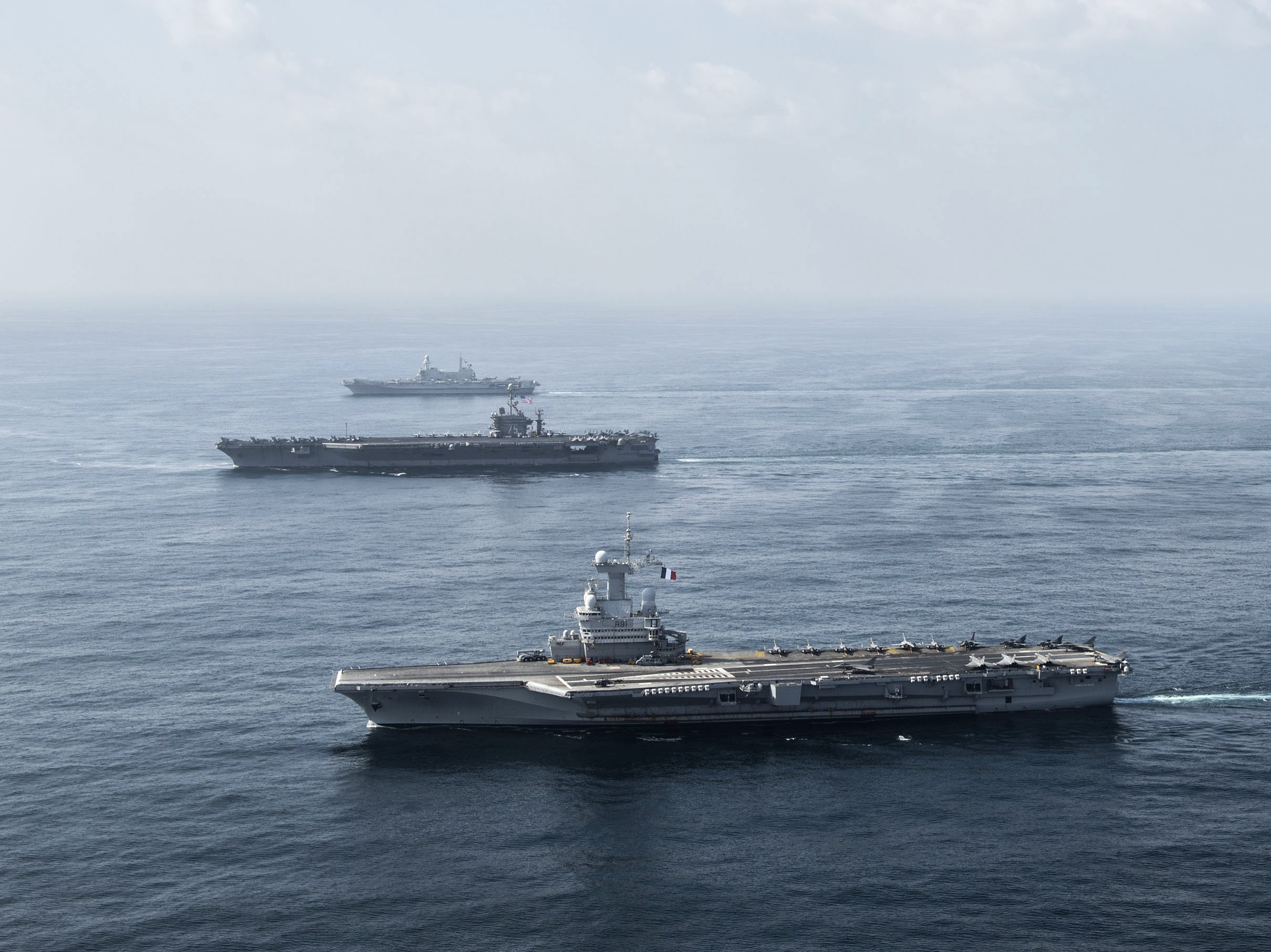
Gulf of Oman (3 January 2014)

On 22 July 2013, Carrier Strike Group Ten departed Norfolk Naval Base, Virginia, for its 2013 deployment to the Persian Gulf and Indian Ocean. The group was scheduled to join the U.S. Fifth Fleet in mid-August, and was slated to relieve Carrier Strike Group Eleven. The duration of this deployment was estimated to be between eight and nine months in length. The surface warfare duties for the strike group will be coordinated by the 1st Combined Destroyer Squadron, a combined American-British staff. Carrier Strike Group Ten joined the U.S. Sixth Fleet in the Mediterranean Sea in two sections. The first section consisted of the cruiser San Jacinto and the two destroyers, joining the fleet on 26 July 2013. The second section consisted of the carrier Harry S. Truman and the cruiser Gettysburg, joining on 29 July 2013. This is the first time that the strike group has operated with the Sixth Fleet since 2010.

On 19 August 2013, Carrier Strike Group Ten transited the Suez Canal (pictured) and joined the U.S. Fifth Fleet. Carrier Strike Group Ten relieved Carrier Strike Group Eleven on 26 August 2013 and began combat air operations in support of the War in Afghanistan on 27 August 2013 (pictured). Both U.S. Navy carrier strike groups remained in the north Arabian Sea area pending potential military action against Syria amid allegations that the regime of Syrian president Bashar al-Assad used chemical weapons during the ongoing Syrian civil war, including the gas attacks that occurred on 21 August 2013. On 2 September 2013, Carrier Strike Group Eleven moved into the Red Sea while Carrier Strike Group Ten continued to operate in the North Arabian Sea.

On 6 October 2013, the strike group's flagship, Harry S. Truman, dispatched a helicopter in response to a medical assistance on board the Marshall Islands-flagged merchant vessel C Elephant located 130 nautical miles (240 km; 150 mi) from Carrier Strike Group in the Gulf of Oman.

The destroyer Mason carried out independent operations in the Gulf of Aden, the Red Sea, and the Mediterranean Sea, including escorting the flagship of Carrier Strike Group Eleven, the carrier Nimitz, during its southbound transit of the Suez Canal on 6 November 2013.

On 16 November 2013, the cruiser San Jacinto provided assistance to a fishing vessel found adrift in the Red Sea. The two mariners were brought on board San Jacinto for medical examination prior to transferring them to the Yemen Coast Guard on 17 November 2013. Previously in October 2013, San Jacinto escorted Carrier Strike Group Eleven when that group operated in Red Sea.

By the midpoint of this deployment, 6 December 2013, Carrier Strike Group Ten and its Carrier Air Wing Three embarked on the carrier Truman had completed over 7,000 sorties for a total of 19,700 flight hours, including 1,500 sorties in support of combat operation in Afghanistan for a total of over 8,900 flight hours.

As of New Year's Day 2014, Carrier Strike Group Ten was the only U.S. Navy carrier strike group underway worldwide. On 14 January 2014, Carrier Strike Group Ten began combined air operations with the French Navy's Task Force 473 led by its flagship, the nuclear-powered aircraft carrier Charles de Gaulle. Additionally, both carrier task groups conducted cross-deck air training, air defense maneuvers, and a war at sea exercise during this month-long combined deployment in the Persian Gulf. On 2 February 2014, combined operations between the two carrier task groups concluded. Carrier Strike Group Ten ended combat operations for its 2013–2014 deployment on 19 March 2014. Carrier Air Wing Three flew over 2,900 sorties for over 16,400 flight hours in support of coalition operations in Afghanistan since 27 August 2013. On 22 March 2014, Carrier Strike Group Two relieved Carrier Strike Group Ten as Task Force 50. Carrier Strike Group Ten transited the Bab-el-Mandeb strait on 24 March 2014. On 18 April 2014, units of Carrier Strike Group Ten arrived back at their home-ports, completing a nine-month-long deployment.

Subsequently, Harry S. Truman entered the Norfolk Naval Shipyard, Virginia, to begin its yard maintenance period on 5 November 2014. Major tasks include modernization of the nuclear propulsion plant, the main engine, and attached lube oil pump repairs as well as major inspections of the ship's catapult launch system.

2013 deployment force composition

| CARSTRKGRU 10 Warships | Carrier Air Wing Three (CVW-3) squadrons embarked aboard flagship USS Harry S. Truman (CVN-75) | |
|---|---|---|
| USS Gettysburg (CG-64) | Marine Fighter Attack Squadron 312 (VMFA-312): 10 FA-18C | Carrier Airborne Early Warning Squadron 116 (VAW-116): 4 E-2C |
| USS San Jacinto (CG-56) | Strike Fighter Squadron 105 (VFA-105): 12 F/A-18E | Helicopter Sea Combat Squadron 7 (HSC-7): 8 MH-60S |
| USS Mason (DDG-87) | Strike Fighter Squadron 37 (VFA-37): 10 F/A-18C | Helicopter Maritime Strike Squadron 74 (HSM-74): 11 MH-60R |
| USS Bulkeley (DDG-84) | Strike Fighter Squadron 32 (VFA-32): 12 FA-18F | Fleet Logistics Support Squadron 40 (VRC-40), Det. 4: 2 C-2A |
| USNS Arctic (T-AOE-8) | Tactical Electronics Warfare Squadron 130 (VAQ-130): 5 EA-18G Growler | —— |

2013 deployment exercises and port visits

| Number | Regional exercises/combined operations | | | | Port visits | | Notes |
| Number | Duration | U.S. force | Bilateral/multilateral partner(s) | Operating area | Location | Dates | Notes |
|---|---|---|---|---|---|---|---|
| 1st: | —— | Mason | —— | —— | Amsterdam, Netherlands | 2–7 Aug 2013 | |
| 2nd: | —— | Harry S. Truman, Gettysburg | —— | —— | Marseille, France | 5–9 Aug 2013 | |
| 3rd: | —— | Bulkeley | —— | —— | Sevastopol, Ukraine | 6–9 Aug 2013 | |
| 4th: | —— | San Jacinto | —— | —— | Split, Croatia | 10–14 Aug 2013 | |
| 5th: | —— | Bulkeley | —— | —— | Batumi, Georgia | 10–13 Aug 2013 | |
| 6th: | 24 September 2013 | Bulkeley, Dallas | Response Force Task Group | Gulf of Oman | Hidd, Bahrain | 28 August 2013 | |
| 7th: | 24–25 August 2013 | Mason | Harbin, Weishanhu | Gulf of Aden | Eilat, Israel | 23–27 Sep 2013 | |
| 8th: | —— | Harry S. Truman, Gettysburg | —— | —— | Hidd, Bahrain | 18–23 Sep 2013 | |
| 9th: | —— | San Jacinto | —— | —— | Jebel Ali, UAE | 23 September 2013 | |
| 10th: | 28–31 Oct 2013 | Bulkeley, Ponce, Sirocco | Lucky Mariner 14–1: Armilla Patrol | Persian Gulf | Muscat, Oman | 18–22 Oct 2013 | |
| 11th: | —— | Harry S. Truman, Gettysburg | —— | —— | Jebel Ali, UAE | 25–29 Oct 2013 | |
| 12th: | —— | Harry S. Truman | —— | —— | Jebel Ali, UAE | 16–20 Nov 2013 | |
| 13th: | —— | San Jacinto | —— | —— | Hidd, Bahrain | 5 December 2013 | |
| 14th: | —— | Harry S. Truman, Gettysburg | —— | —— | Hidd, Bahrain | 22–28 Dec 2013 | |
| 15th: | 29 December 2013 to 2 February 2014 | Carrier Strike Group Ten (Note: Aircraft carrier USS Harry S. Truman (CVN-75); guided-missile cruisers USS Gettysburg (CG-64) and USS San Jacinto (CG-56); and guided-missile destroyers USS Bulkeley (DDG-84), USS Carney (DDG-64), USS Hopper (DDG-70), and USS Mason (DDG-87).) | French Navy Task Force 473 (Note: Aircraft carrier FS Charles de Gaulle (R 91), destroyer FS Forbin (D 620), frigate FS Jean de Vienne (D 643), and replenishment oiler FS Meuse (A 607), plus the Italian aircraft carrier ITS Cavour (CVH 550).) | Gulf of Oman | Hidd, Bahrain | 21–24 Jan 2014 | |

=== 2015 operations ===
On 27 May 2015, the Harry S. Truman completed five days of sea trials following its six-month condensed incremental availability (CIA) maintenance period. From 19 May 29 to 4 June 2015, the Truman completed flight deck certification and carrier qualifications. Truman also conducted an underway on-loading of ammunition from the dry cargo ship USNS William McLean (T-AKE-12) between 1–3 June 2015. Over 1,340 pallets of ordnance weighing estimated 3,900,000 lb (1,800,000 kg) were transferred to the Truman in preparation for the upcoming work-up exercise cycles for 2015 deployment of Carrier Strike Group Ten. On 8 June 2015, the Truman completed its Tailored Ship's Training Availability (TSTA) exercises. The strike group completed its Fleet Synthetic Training – Group Commander exercise on 21 August 2015. Truman departed for its Composite Training Unit Exercise (COMPTUEX) and Joint Task Force Exercise (JTFEX) training on 2 September 2015.

=== DSCA operations, September 2017 ===
Units under the command of CSG-10 commander Rear Adm. Samuel Paparo, including the amphibious assault ship USS Iwo Jima (LHD-7), the amphibious transport dock ship USS New York (LPD-21) and the guided-missile cruiser USS San Jacinto (CG-56), along with various embarked air and amphibious landing assets, arrived on station off of Key West, Florida, 12 Sep, to support Hurricane Irma relief efforts as part of Defense Support of Civilian Authorities (DSCA) operations.

The ships departed with Amphibious Squadron 4, a component of the 26th Marine Expeditionary Unit, a detachment from Helicopter Sea Combat Squadron 28, as well as members of Explosive Ordnance Disposal Group 2, Tactical Air Control Squadron 22 and Fleet Surgical Team 8.

The ships and embarked units joined the ongoing efforts of the aircraft carrier USS Abraham Lincoln (CVN-72), the amphibious assault ships USS Wasp (LHD-1) and USS Kearsarge (LHD-3) and dock landing ship USS Oak Hill (LSD-51). The Navy's involvement in the humanitarian assistance operations was led by the Federal Emergency Management Agency (FEMA) in conjunction with the Department of Defense.

While on station, Sailors and Marines worked with the people of Monroe County, along the Lower Keys, from Marathon to Key West and points between, clearing debris from roadways, distributing food and water, and repairing generators and other critical infrastructure such as water-pumping stations. Highlights included fly-away teams from both Iwo Jima and New York, Sailors normally deep within the ship making it go, who formed engineering-centric teams who helicoptered in and performed rapid repairs on generators in senior living communities. Initial operations wrapped up on 16 Sept.

=== Unit changes ===
On 6 October 2014, U.S. Fleet Forces Command announced that the future deployments for two Norfolk-based aircraft carriers have been changed in accordance with the U.S. Navy's Optimized Fleet Response Plan (O-FRP).

Beginning in Fiscal Year 2015, the Optimized Fleet Response Plan aligns carrier strike groups to a 36-month training and deployment cycle. All required maintenance, training, evaluations, plus a single eight-month overseas deployment, are scheduled throughout this 36-month cycle in order to reduce costs while increasing overall fleet readiness. Additionally, this new plan streamlined the inspection and evaluation process while maintaining a surge capacity for emergency deployments. The ultimate objective is to reduce time at sea while increasing in-port time from 49% to 68%. While initially to be used by U.S. Navy carrier strike groups, the Optimized Fleet Response Plan will be adopted for all fleet operations.

Accordingly, the carrier Harry S. Truman will be the first carrier to deploy under this new O-FRP cycle, replacing the previously scheduled USS Dwight D. Eisenhower (CVN-69) in the deployment lineup. Additionally, the Carrier Strike Group Eight command staff will deploy with Truman while Eisenhower will serve as the new flagship for Carrier Strike Group Ten. This change does not affect the other ships or units that are otherwise assigned to either strike groups.

=== 2022 deployment ===
On 10 August 2022, Carrier Strike Group 10 left Naval Station Norfolk to start a new deployment, with USS George H.W. Bush (CVN-77) as the group's flagship. This deployment is the carrier's first since 2017 and since she underwent major maintenance. USNI News reported that CSG-10 is most likely set to relieve Carrier Strike Group 8 (CSG-8) and its flagship, the USS Harry S. Truman (CVN-75), in the Mediterranean Sea. On 25 August 2022, CSG-10 transited the Strait of Gibraltar and entered the Mediterranean Sea.

=== 2026 deployment ===
On 31 March 2026, Carrier Strike Group 10 departed Naval Station Norfolk for deployment to the Middle East, following ongoing combat operations by the US towards Iran. The Carrier Strike Group had arrived in CENTCOM's area of responsibility on April 23, 2026, bringing the amount of Carrier Strike Group's in the area to 3. This is the first time in decades since three aircraft carriers were operating in the Middle East.

2026 deployment force composition

| Warships | Carrier Air Wing Seven squadrons embarked aboard USS George H. W. Bush (CVN-77) | |
|---|---|---|
| USS Ross (DDG-71) | Strike Fighter Squadron 103: F/A-18E/F | Electronic Attack Squadron 140: EA-18G |
| USS Donald Cook (DDG-75) | Strike Fighter Squadron 83: F/A-18E | Helicopter Sea Combat Squadron 14: MH-60S |
| USS Mason (DDG-87) | Strike Fighter Squadron 131: F/A-18E | Helicopter Maritime Strike Squadron 46: MH-60R |
| —— | Strike Fighter Squadron 105: F/A-18E/F | Airborne Command and Control Squadron 116: E-2D |
| —— | Fleet Logistics Support Squadron 40: C-2A | —— |

== See also ==
- History of the United States Navy
- List of United States Navy aircraft squadrons

== Notes ==
Footnotes

Citations

== Sources ==
- Morison, Samuel Loring (September 2014). "U.S. Battle Force Aviation Changes 2013–14". Naval Institute Proceedings. 140 (4): 48–50. ISSN 0041-798X. "Registration required."
- —— (May 2009). "U.S. Naval Battle Force Changes 1 January 2008–31 December 2008: Aircraft Carrier Air Wing Assignments and Composition as of 17 Feb 2009". Naval Institute Proceedings. 135 (5): 118–120. ISSN 0041-798X. "Registration required."
- —— (May 2010). "U.S. Naval Battle Force Changes 1 January 2009–31 December 2009: Aircraft Carrier Air Wing Assignments and Composition as of 1 March 2010". Naval Institute Proceedings. 136 (5): 106–116. ISSN 0041-798X. "Registration required."
- —— (May 2011). "U.S. Naval Battle Force Changes 1 January 2010–31 December 2010: Aircraft Carrier Air Wing Assignments and Composition as of 1 March 2011". Naval Institute Proceedings. 137 (5): 117–120. ISSN 0041-798X. "Registration required."
- Morton, John Fass (2003). Mustin: A Naval Family of the 20th Century. Annapolis, Maryland: United States Naval Institute Press. ISBN 1-59114-492-2.
- —— (May 2012). "U.S. Naval Battle Force Changes 1 January 2011–31 December 2011: Aircraft Carrier Air Wing Assignments and Composition as of 2 April 2012". Naval Institute Proceedings. 138 (5): 112. ISSN 0041-798X. "Registration required."
