= William E. Gortney =

United States Navy admiral

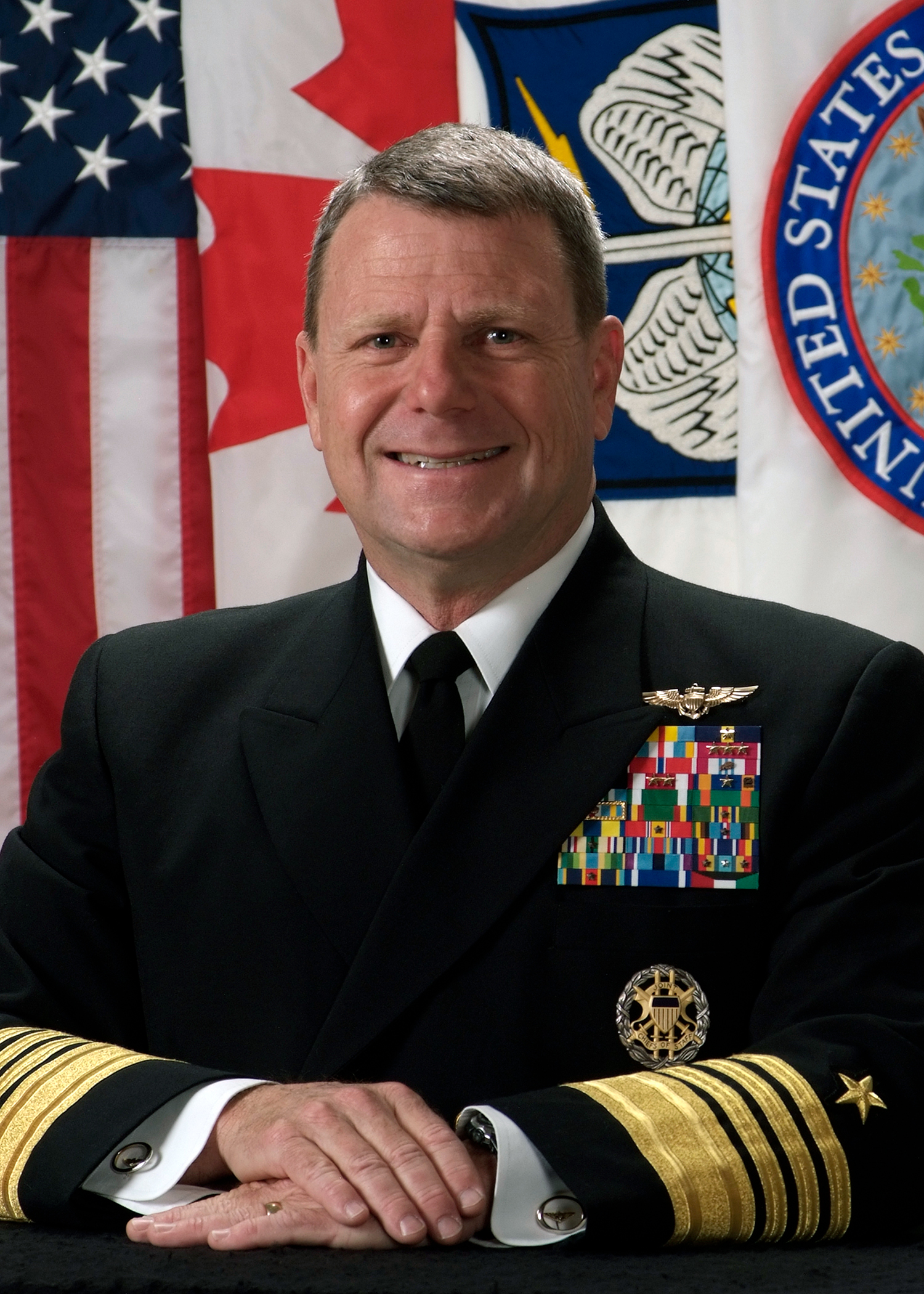
- Official portrait, 2015
- Born: 25 September 1955 (age 71); La Jolla, California, U.S.
- Military career
- Allegiance: United States
- Branch: United States Navy
- Service years: 1977–2016
- Rank: Admiral
- Nicknames: "Bill", "Shortney Gortney"
- Commands: United States Northern Command; North American Aerospace Defense Command; United States Fleet Forces Command; Carrier Air Wing 7 Carrier Strike Group Ten; United States Fifth Fleet
- Conflicts: Gulf War
- Awards: Defense Distinguished Service Medal (2); Navy Distinguished Service Medal (2); Defense Superior Service Medal; Legion of Merit (4); Bronze Star Medal

William Evans "Bill" Gortney (born 25 September 1955) is a retired United States Navy admiral who served as the sixth commander of United States Northern Command and the 23rd commander of North American Aerospace Defense Command (NORAD). He previously served as the Commander, United States Fleet Forces Command from 14 September 2012 to December 2014 and Director of the Joint Staff from 1 July 2010 to August 2012. Prior to that, he served as Commander, U.S. Naval Forces Central Command/5th Fleet. He assumed his post as CDRUSNORTHCOM and commander of NORAD on 5 December 2014, and was succeeded by General Lori Robinson on 13 May 2016.

== Early life and education ==
Gortney was born on 25 September 1955, and graduated from Elon College (now Elon University) in North Carolina, earning a Bachelor of Arts in History and Political Science in 1977. He was an officer of Kappa Sigma fraternity and a member of the varsity soccer team and the rugby club. The son of a retired United States Navy captain and a second generation Naval Aviator, Gortney entered the United States Navy as an aviation officer candidate at Aviation Officer Candidate School (AOCS, Class 12–77 [The Gamesmen]) in the summer of 1977 at NAS Pensacola, Florida.

== Career ==
Gortney received his commission in the United States Naval Reserve in September 1977 and earned his wings of gold and designation as a Naval Aviator following graduation from the jet strike pilot training pipeline in December 1978. He later augmented to the Regular Navy. Shore assignments include Training Squadron 26 (VT-26), NAS Chase Field, Texas, 1978–1980; Strike Fighter Squadron 125 (VFA-125), NAS Lemoore, California, 1984–1988, and aide and flag lieutenant to the Assistant Chief of Naval Operations (Air Warfare), Washington, 1990–1991. He is a 1996 graduate of the Naval War College, earning a Master of Arts in International Security Affairs. Additional command tours include Strike Fighter Squadron 15 (VFA-15), 1994–1995, on board USS Theodore Roosevelt, and VFA-106, the East Coast F/A-18 Fleet Replacement Squadron, NAS Cecil Field, Florida, 1996–1997. Fleet assignments include Attack Squadron 82 (VA-82), 1981–1984, on board USS Nimitz; VFA-87, 1988–1990, on board USS Theodore Roosevelt; executive officer, VFA-132, 1991–1992, on board USS Forrestal and executive officer, VFA-15, 1992–1994, on board USS Theodore Roosevelt.

In 2015, Gortney ordered "recruiting centers, reserve centers and ROTC facilities to increase surveillance and take basic steps such as closing blinds at the offices," in response to an armed shooting in Tennessee that resulted in the deaths of five US servicemen.

=== Flag assignments ===
Gortney's first flag tour was as the Deputy Chief of Staff for Global Force Management and Joint Operations, Fleet Forces Command, Norfolk, Virginia, 2004–2006. This was followed by assignment as Commander, Carrier Strike Group 10, during which time he was promoted to a two-star rear admiral. Appointed for promotion to vice admiral, he was then assigned as Commander, U.S. Naval Forces Central Command / U.S. 5th Fleet / Combined Maritime Forces. This was Gortney's third command tour in the U.S. Central Command (USCENTCOM) area of operations, supporting Maritime Security Operations and combat operations for Operation Enduring Freedom and Operation Iraqi Freedom. His previous command assignments in the USCENTCOM area of operations include Command of Carrier Air Wing 7 while he was still a captain, embarked aboard USS John F. Kennedy, in direct support of OEF in 2002. His second was as Commander, Carrier Strike Group Ten, on board USS Harry S. Truman, in support of Maritime Security Operations and OIF from 2007 to 2008.

Gortney's experience in the United States Central Command area of operations includes serving on the Joint Staff, J-33 Joint Operations Department CENTCOM Division (JODCENT) from 1998 to 1999, and tours supporting the violent peace of Operation Southern Watch from 2000 to 2001 as Deputy for Current Operations, Joint Task Force Southwest Asia (JTF-SWA) at Eskan Village, Saudi Arabia, and deploying as Deputy Commander, Carrier Air Wing 7, on board USS Dwight D. Eisenhower. He also served as Chief, Naval and Amphibious Liaison Element (NALE) to the Combined Forces Air Component Commander, U.S. Central Command, at Prince Sultan Air Base, Saudi Arabia, for the opening months of the 2003 invasion of Iraq, followed as Chief of Staff for Commander, U.S. Naval Forces Central Command / U.S. 5th Fleet in Bahrain from 2003 to 2004.

Gortney has flown over 5,360 flight hours and 1,265 carrier-arrested landings, primarily in the A-7E Corsair II and the F/A-18 Hornet.

== Awards and decorations ==
=== Medals and ribbons ===
U.S. military decorations
Defense Distinguished Service Medal w/ 1 bronze oak leaf cluster
Navy Distinguished Service Medal w/ 1 gold award star
Defense Superior Service Medal
Legion of Merit w/ 3 award stars
Bronze Star Medal
Defense Meritorious Service Medal w/ 1 oak leaf cluster
Meritorious Service Medal w/ 2 award stars
Air Medal w/ award star and bronze Strike/Flight numerals 2
Joint Service Commendation Medal w/ 2 oak leaf clusters
Navy and Marine Corps Commendation Medal
Navy and Marine Corps Achievement Medal
Unit awards
Joint Meritorious Unit Award w/ 1 oak leaf cluster
Navy Unit Commendation
Navy Meritorious Unit Commendation w/ 1 bronze service star
U.S. service (campaign) medals and ribbons
Navy Expeditionary Medal
National Defense Service Medal w/ 1 service star
Armed Forces Expeditionary Medal w/ 1 service star
Southwest Asia Service Medal w/ 1 campaign star
Global War on Terrorism Expeditionary Medal
Global War on Terrorism Service Medal
Armed Forces Service Medal
Humanitarian Service Medal
Sea Service Ribbon w/ 1 silver and two bronze service stars
Navy and Marine Corps Overseas Service Ribbon w/ 1 service star
Foreign military decorations
The Khalifiyyeh Order of Bahrain, 1st class
Canada Meritorious Service Cross (Military Division)
Condecoración al Mérito Militar, Primera Clase (Mexico)
Condecoración al Mérito Naval, Segunda Clase (Mexico)
Legion of Honour, Knight (France)
Non-U.S. service and campaign medals
NATO Medal for Former Yugoslavia
Kuwait Liberation Medal (Kuwait)

U.S. badges
Naval Aviator Badge
Command at Sea insignia
Joint Chiefs of Staff Identification Badge

Military offices
Preceded by Joseph F. Kilkenny	Commander of Carrier Strike Group 10; 2006–2008	Succeeded by Mark I. Fox
Preceded by Kevin J. Cosgriff	Commander of the United States Naval Forces Central Command; 2008–2010	Succeeded by Mark I. Fox
Preceded by Kevin J. Cosgriff	Commander of the United States Fifth Fleet; 2008–2010	Succeeded by Mark I. Fox
Preceded by Lloyd Austin	Director of the Joint Staff; 2010–2012	Succeeded by Curtis Scaparrotti
Preceded by John C. Harvey Jr.	Commander of the United States Fleet Forces Command; 2012–2014	Succeeded by Philip S. Davidson
Preceded by Charles H. Jacoby Jr.	Commander of the United States Northern Command and North American Aerospace Defense Command; 2014–2016	Succeeded by Lori Robinson
