= Marcus Fox (disambiguation) =

Marcus Fox (1927–2002) was a British Conservative Party politician.

Marcus Fox may also refer to:

- Marcus Fox, fictional character in television series Intruders

== See also ==
- Mark Fox (disambiguation)
