= Simon Fox (footballer) =

English footballer

Personal information
- Full name: Simon Michael Fox
- Date of birth: 28 August 1977 (age 49)
- Place of birth: Basingstoke, England
- Height: 5 ft 10 in (1.78 m)
- Position: Forward

Youth career
- Basingstoke Town
- Fleet Town
- Brighton & Hove Albion

Senior career*
Years	Team	Apps	(Gls)
1995–1997	Brighton & Hove Albion	21	(0)
1997–????	Hastings Town		
- St Leonards
- Rye & Iden United
- * Club domestic league appearances and goals

Simon Michael Fox (born 28 August 1977) is an English former professional footballer who played as a forward in the Football League for Brighton & Hove Albion.

== Life and career ==
Fox was born in 1977 in Basingstoke, Hampshire, and played youth football for Basingstoke Town and Fleet Town before signing for Brighton & Hove Albion as a schoolboy. He made his first-team debut on 23 April 1994, at the age of 16 years 238 days, in a Football League Second Division match at home to Fulham, becoming the youngest player to play in a competitive match for the club in peacetime. He turned professional in 1995, and made 24 appearances before being released at the end of the 1996–97 season. He went on to play non-league football for clubs including Hastings Town, St Leonards and Rye & Iden United.

Fox's older brother Mark played alongside him for Brighton & Hove Albion and for St Leonards.
