= Joseph F. Kilkenny =

American naval officer

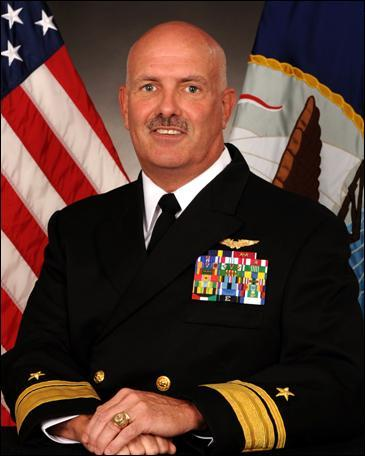
- Allegiance: United States
- Service / branch: United States Navy
- Rank: Rear Admiral
- Commands: Carrier Strike Group 10

Joseph F. Kilkenny is a Navy Rear Admiral who was commander of U.S. Navy Carrier Strike Group 10 and Naval Education and Training Command. Kilkenny graduated from the Citadel in 1977.
