= USS San Jacinto (CG-56) =

Ticonderoga-class cruiser

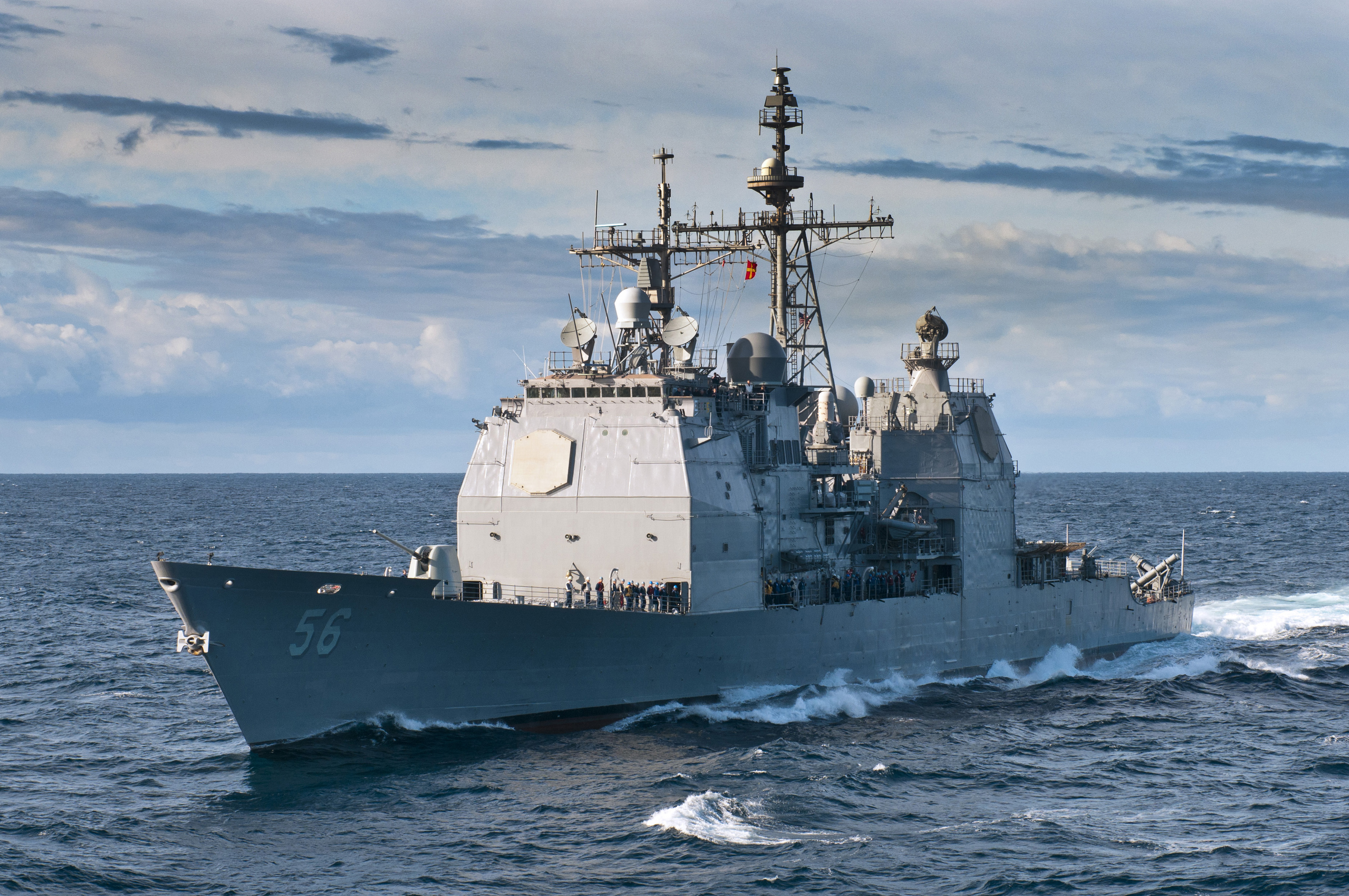
- USS San Jacinto on 6 June 2012

History

United States
- Name: San Jacinto
- Namesake: Battle of San Jacinto
- Ordered: 20 June 1983
- Builder: Ingalls Shipbuilding
- Laid down: 24 July 1985
- Launched: 14 November 1986
- Commissioned: 23 January 1988
- Decommissioned: 15 September 2023
- Identification: Call sign: NJAC; Hull number: CG-56
- Motto: Victory is Certain
- Nickname(s): San Jac
- Status: Stricken, pending final disposal
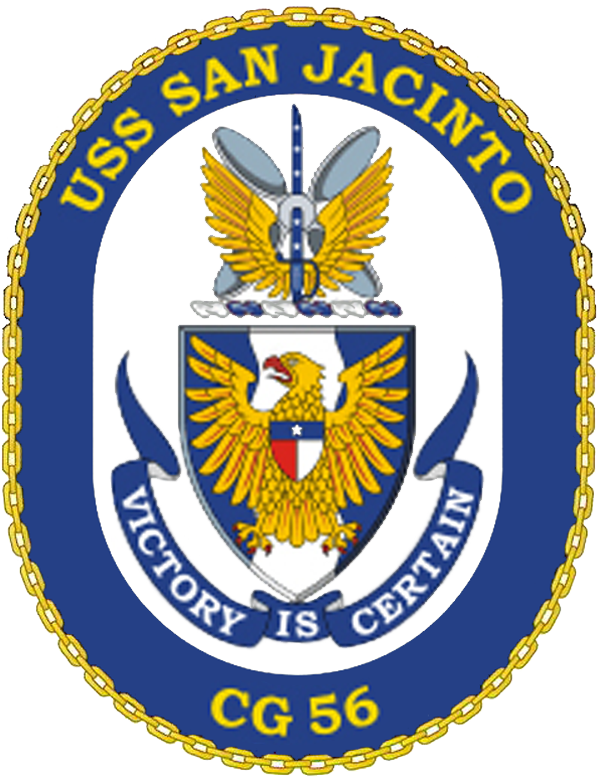
- Badge

General characteristics
- Class & type: Ticonderoga-class cruiser
- Displacement: Approx. 9,600 long tons (9,800 t) full load
- Length: 567 feet (173 m)
- Beam: 55 feet (16.8 meters)
- Draft: 34 feet (10.2 meters)
- Propulsion: 4 × General Electric LM2500 gas turbine engines; 2 × controllable-reversible pitch propellers; 2 × rudders
- Speed: 32.5 knots (60 km/h; 37.4 mph)
- Complement: 30 officers and 300 enlisted
- Sensors & processing systems: AN/SPY-1A/B multi-function radar; AN/SPS-49 air search radar (Removed on some ships); AN/SPG-62 fire control radar; AN/SPS-73 surface search radar; AN/SPQ-9 gun fire control radar; AN/SQQ-89(V)1/3 - A(V)15 Sonar suite, consisting of: AN/SQS-53B/C/D active sonar; AN/SQR-19 TACTAS, AN/SQR-19B ITASS, & MFTA passive sonar; AN/SQQ-28 light airborne multi-purpose system
- Armament: 2 × 61 cell Mk 41 vertical launch systems containing; 122 × mix of: RIM-66M-5 Standard SM-2MR Block IIIB; RIM-156A SM-2ER Block IV; RIM-161 SM-3; RIM-162A ESSM; RIM-174A Standard ERAM; BGM-109 Tomahawk; RUM-139A VL-ASROC; 8 × RGM-84 Harpoon missiles; 2 × 5 in (127 mm)/62 caliber Mark 45 Mod 4 lightweight gun; 2 × Mk 38 25 mm Machine Gun Systems; 2–4 × .50 in (12.7 mm) cal. machine gun; 2 × Phalanx CIWS Block 1B; 2 × Mk 32 12.75 in (324 mm) triple torpedo tubes
- Aircraft carried: 2 × MH-60R Seahawk LAMPS Mk III helicopters.

USS San Jacinto (CG-56) is a decommissioned Ticonderoga-class cruiser in the United States Navy. She is named for the Battle of San Jacinto, the decisive battle of the Texas Revolution.

== Construction ==
San Jacinto was laid down on 24 July 1985, by Ingalls Shipbuilding, in Pascagoula, Mississippi. She was launched on 11 November 1986, and commissioned 23 January 1988, by then vice-president George H. W. Bush in Houston, Texas.

== Service history ==
She completed her fitting out and work-ups, then deployed to the Mediterranean Sea in late May 1989, returning in November. While San Jacinto and her sister ship Leyte Gulf were underway off the Virginia coast, performing testing of CEC, the Iraqi army invaded and occupied Kuwait. The next day, Leyte Gulf detached and headed back to Mayport, Florida. The day after, San Jacinto returned to her homeport of Norfolk, Virginia, to prepare for the massive armada to the Middle East.

After CINCLANT had all their ships provisioned, barely five days later, San Jacinto headed for the Mediterranean. Other ships in the battle group included the cruiser Philippine Sea and the aircraft carriers America and John F. Kennedy. She fired the opening shots of Operation Desert Storm with the launch of two BGM-109 Tomahawk cruise missiles, firing a total of 16 missiles during the 43-day war. She was also the first ship of her class to be deployed with a full load of 122 missiles. While stationed in a search area at the southern tip of the Sinai Peninsula in the Red Sea, her Visit, Boarding, Search & Seizure (VBSS) teams inspected several dozen ships for contraband being smuggled for the Iraqi government.

During her 2000-2001 deployment with Carrier Group Two, she deployed with Helicopter Antisubmarine Squadron Light 42 (HSL-42) Det 8 with two SH-60B Seahawks.

On 26 May 2010, San Jacinto's VBSS team rescued five Yemenis hostages from 13 suspected pirates. The master stated his dhow had been under pirate control for one day only. The VBSS team detained the pirates on the dhow without conflict.

On 13 October 2012, San Jacinto was involved in a collision with U.S. nuclear submarine Montpelier off the coast of northeastern Florida. The cruiser suffered damage to her sonar dome. Due to the emergency dry docking, San Jacinto was unable to join Carrier Strike Group Ten and aircraft carrier Harry S. Truman deployment to the Persian Gulf. By June 2014, the cruiser had undergone approximately $11 million in repairs for the accident.

In 2020, San Jacinto and USS Dwight D. Eisenhower (CVN-69), while on deployment together, became the first U.S. Navy ships to exceed 160 consecutive days at sea. Later in 2020, San Jacinto was deployed to Cape Verde as a deterrent to any attempts to aid Venezuelan diplomat Alex Saab in fleeing the island prior to being extradicted to the U.S. on money-laundering charges.

In December 2020 the U.S. Navy's Report to Congress on the Annual Long-Range Plan for Construction of Naval Vessels stated their intention to decommission the ship in Fiscal Year 2022. The Navy formally asked Congress for permission to decommission the ship in the FY2022 budget in July 2021 along with six other cruisers, but Congress only allowed the Navy to retire five cruisers, and the Navy chose to retain San Jacinto. The Navy again asked Congress for permission to retire the ship in the 2023 budget request.

On 6 May 2022, San Jacinto conducted an underway replenishment (UNREP) with USNS Supply (T-AOE-6). San Jacinto was a part of Carrier Strike Group 8 led by the USS Harry S. Truman in the Mediterranean Sea.

San Jacinto was decommissioned on 15 September 2023 in a ceremony at her homeport Naval Station Norfolk. At that time, the Navy planned to inactivate San Jacinto and tow her to the Navy’s Inactive Ship Maintenance Facility in Philadelphia, Pennsylvania where she would be placed in a Logistic Support Asset (LSA) status.

== Awards ==
- Presidential Unit Citation
- Joint Meritorious Unit Commendation
- Navy Unit Commendation (2020)
- Meritorious Unit Commendation
- Battle E - 15 awards
- National Defense Service Medal (second)
- Armed Forces Expeditionary Medal
- Southwest Asia Service Medal
- Global War on Terrorism Expeditionary Medal
- Armed Forces Service Medal
- Humanitarian Service Medal
- Sea Service Deployment Ribbon (multiple)
- Secretary of the Navy Letter of Commendation
- Chief of Naval Operations Commendation
