= Mark I. Fox =

United States admiral (born 1956)

Mark Irby Fox
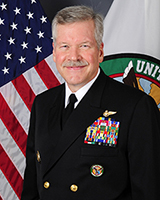
- Vice Admiral Mark I. Fox in October 2013
- Born: March 1, 1956 (age 70); Abilene, Texas, U.S.
- Military career
- Allegiance: United States
- Branch: United States Navy
- Service years: 1978–2016
- Rank: Vice Admiral
- Nickname: MRT
- Commands: United States Naval Forces Central Command; United States Fifth Fleet; Naval Strike and Air Warfare Center; Carrier Strike Group Ten; Carrier Air Wing 2 VFA-122; VFA-81
- Conflicts: Gulf War; Iraq War
- Awards: Defense Distinguished Service Medal; Navy Distinguished Service Medal (2); Silver Star; Legion of Merit (3); Distinguished Flying Cross; Bronze Star Medal (2)

Mark Irby "MRT" Fox (born March 1, 1956) is a retired United States Navy vice admiral who served as the Deputy Commander of United States Central Command (CENTCOM). Prior to assuming his duties at CENTCOM, he served as Deputy Chief of Naval Operations for Operations, Plans, and Strategy (N3/N5), Commander, United States Naval Forces Central Command and Commander, United States Fifth Fleet. He also previously served as the Commander of the Naval Strike and Air Warfare Center at Naval Air Station Fallon, Nevada, and as Communications Division Chief, American Embassy Annex, Baghdad, Iraq.

In October 2006, then-Rear Admiral Fox completed a tour as the Deputy Assistant to the President and Director of the White House Military Office (WHMO), responsible for overseeing all military support to the President of the United States. He also served as WHMO Deputy Director for 18 months before assuming responsibilities as WHMO Director in January 2005.

== Naval career ==
A native of Abilene, Texas, Fox was commissioned in June 1978 upon graduation from the United States Naval Academy and was designated a naval aviator in March 1980.

During his career, Fox deployed from both coasts in five fleet tours, flying the A-7E Corsair II and F/A-18 Hornet in over 100 combat and contingency missions off the coasts of Lebanon and Libya, and over the Balkans and Iraq.

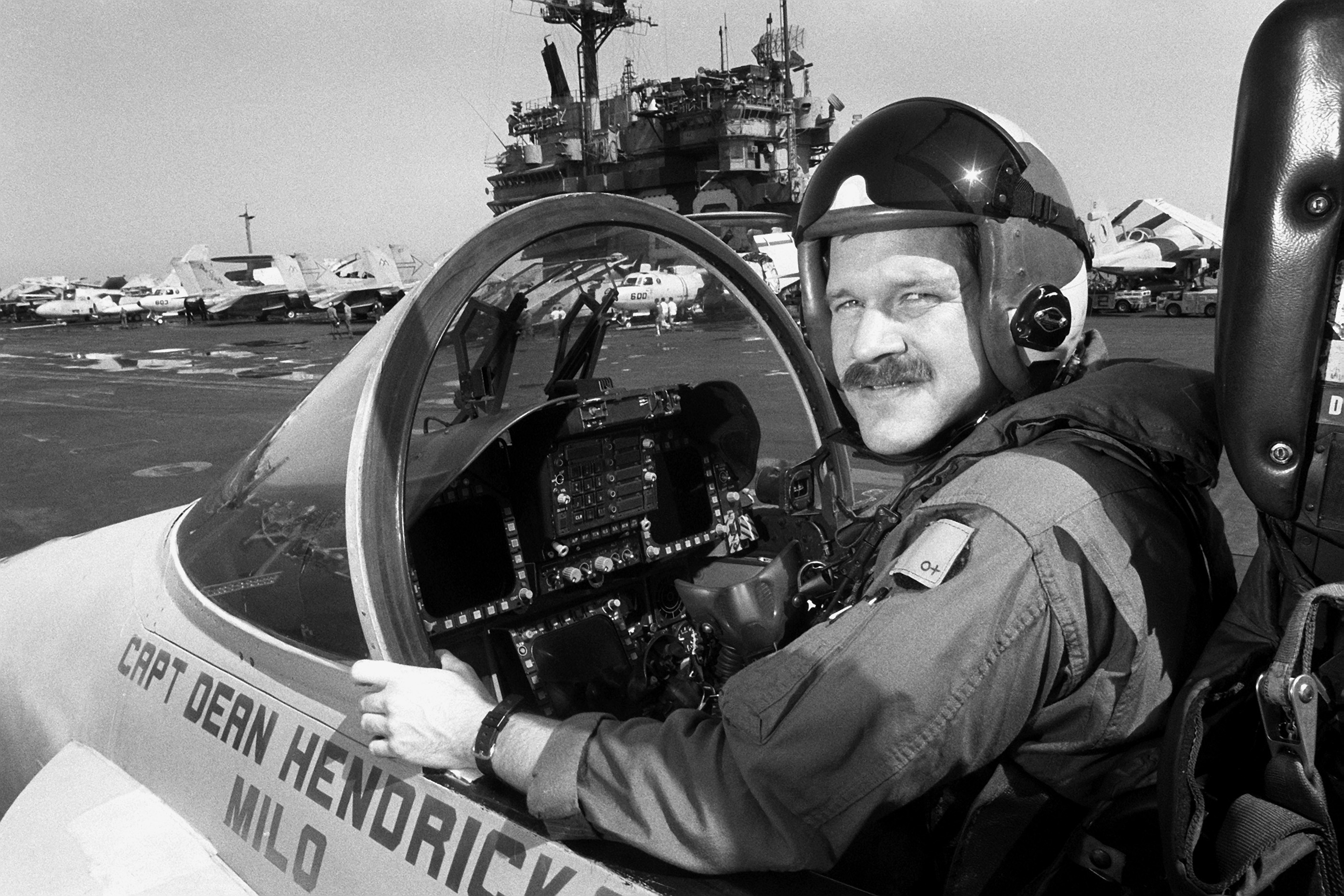
Lieutenant Commander Fox after recording first Iraqi MiG shoot down by coalition forces during Operation Desert Storm

Fox's combat highlights include scoring the first navy MiG kill of Operation Desert Storm prior to dropping his bombs on an airfield in western Iraq on January 17, 1991, and leading the opening "Shock and Awe" strike of Operation Iraqi Freedom on March 21, 2003.

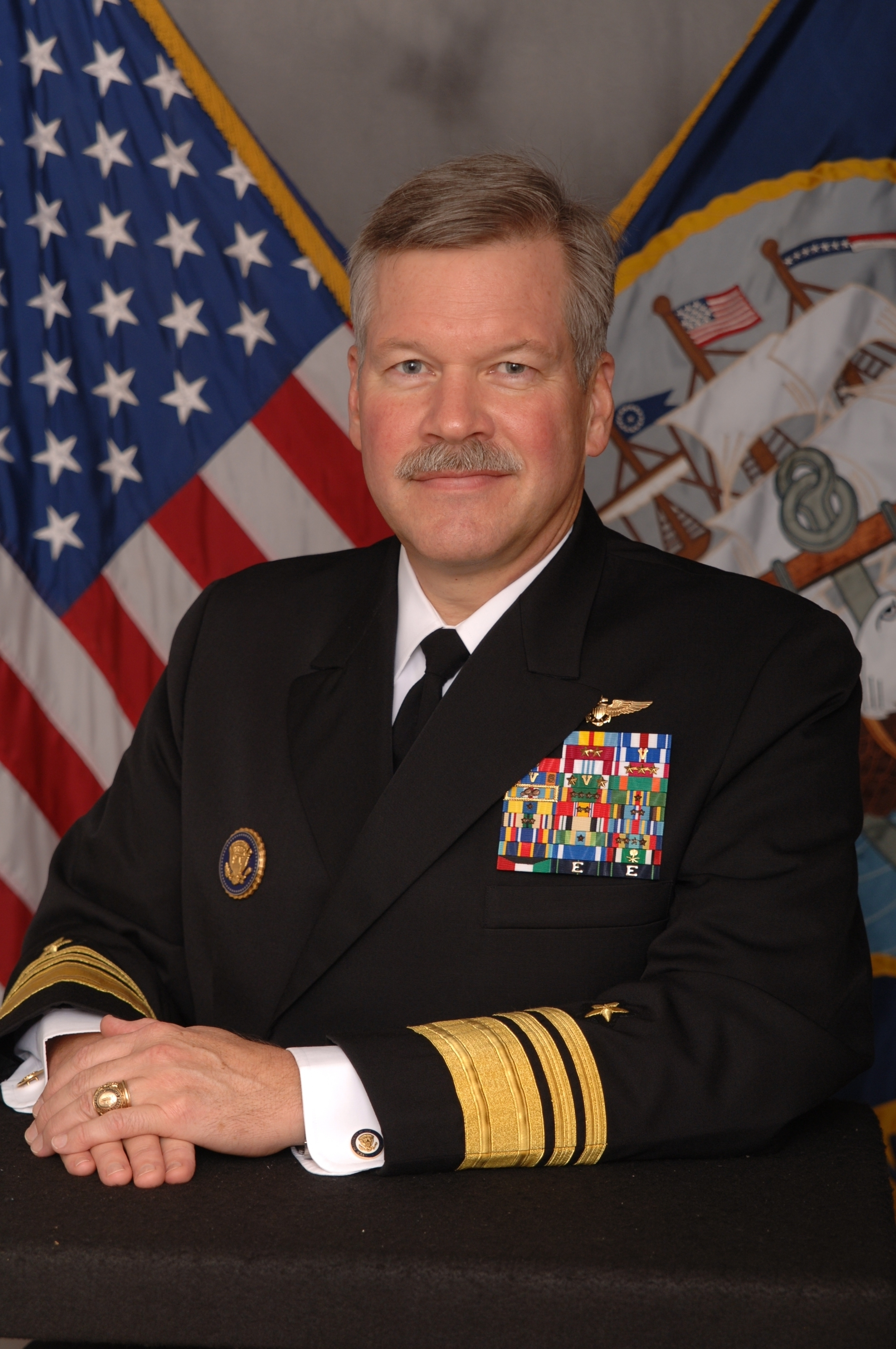
Vice Admiral Fox as Commander United States Naval Forces Central Command

Fox's previous command assignments include Commander, Naval Strike and Air Warfare Center; Commander, Carrier Strike Group Ten; Commander, Carrier Air Wing 2; Commander, Strike Fighter Wing, United States Pacific Fleet; the first Commanding Officer of Strike Fighter Squadron 122 (the Navy's first F/A-18E/F Super Hornet Fleet Replacement Squadron), and Commanding Officer of Strike Fighter Squadron 81.

Shore tours include duty as an A-7E Instructor Pilot in Attack Squadron 174; a tour as the Light Attack/Strike Fighter Junior Officer Detailer in the Naval Military Personnel Command; assignment as Aide and Flag Lieutenant for Commander, Naval Air Force, United States Atlantic Fleet; Aide and Flag Lieutenant to the Assistant Chief of Naval Operations (Air Warfare – OP-05); joint duty as the Maritime Plans Officer at Supreme Headquarters Allied Powers Europe in Casteau, Belgium; and service as the Joint Strike and Aviation Programs Liaison Officer in the Navy's Office of Legislative Affairs in Washington, D.C.

== Corporate career ==
Fox retired from the navy in April 2016, and in June 2016 joined Huntington Ingalls Industries as Newport News Shipbuilding Vice President of Customer Affairs.

Fox is married to Priscilla (née Wood). They have four children, William, Collin, Mason and Abigail.

== Awards and decorations ==
Fox has logged over 4,900 flight hours and 1,348 arrested landings on 15 different aircraft carriers.

Naval Aviator insignia
Presidential Service Badge
United States Central Command Badge

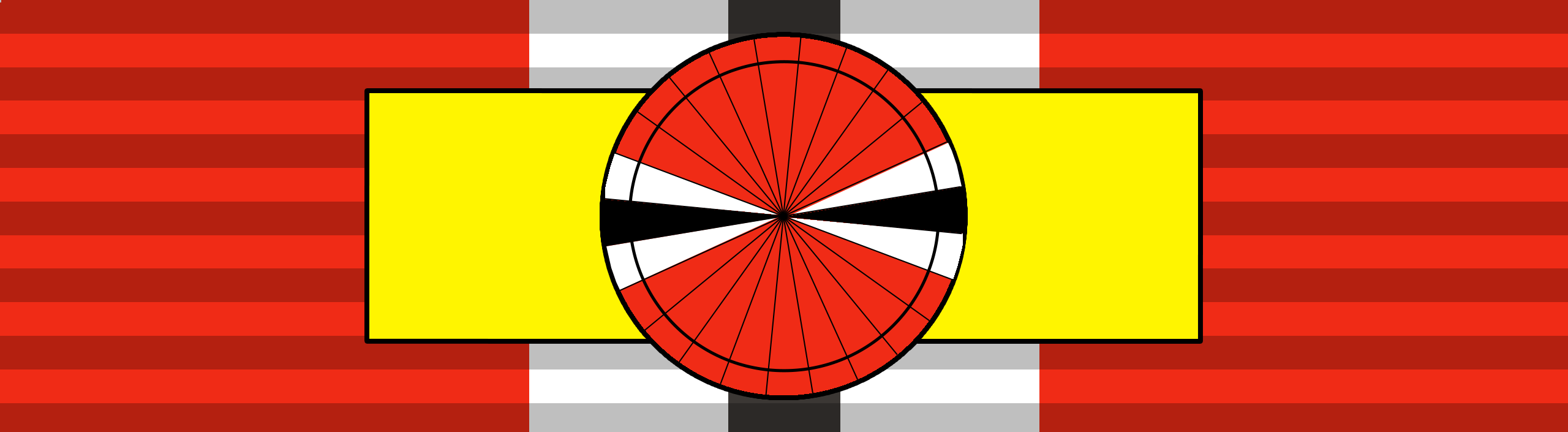
| Defense Distinguished Service Medal |
| Navy Distinguished Service Medal (with 1 gold award star) |
| Silver Star |
| Legion of Merit (with 2 award stars) |
| Distinguished Flying Cross (with Combat "V") |
| Bronze Star (with 1 award star) |
| Defense Meritorious Service Medal |
| Meritorious Service Medal (with 3 award stars) |
| Air Medal (with Combat V, silver award star and bronze Strike/Flight numeral 6) |
| Navy and Marine Corps Commendation Medal (with Combat V and 2 award stars) |
| Navy and Marine Corps Achievement Medal |
| Joint Meritorious Unit Award (with 2 bronze oak leaf clusters) |
| Navy Unit Commendation (with 4 bronze service stars) |
| Navy Meritorious Unit Commendation (with 1 service star) |
| Navy Expeditionary Medal (with 1 service star) |
| National Defense Service Medal (with 2 service stars) |
| Armed Forces Expeditionary Medal (with 2 service stars) |
| Southwest Asia Service Medal (with 2 service stars) |
| Iraq Campaign Medal |
| Global War on Terrorism Expeditionary Medal |
| Global War on Terrorism Service Medal |
| Armed Forces Service Medal (with 1 service star) |
| Navy Sea Service Deployment Ribbon (with 1 silver and 3 bronze service stars) |
| Navy & Marine Corps Overseas Service Ribbon |
| Order of National Security Merit, Gukseon Medal (Republic of Korea) |
| The Khalifiyyeh Order of Bahrain, First Class |
| NATO Medal for the former Yugoslavia |
| Kuwait Liberation Medal (Saudi Arabia) |
| Kuwait Liberation Medal (Kuwait) |
| Navy Expert Rifleman Medal |
| Navy Expert Pistol Shot Medal |

Military offices
| Preceded by William E. Gortney | Commander of the United States Naval Forces Central Command; 2010–2012 | Succeeded by John W. Miller |
| Preceded by William E. Gortney | Commander of the United States Fifth Fleet; 2010–2012 | Succeeded by John W. Miller |
| Preceded by Bruce W. Clingan | Deputy Chief of Naval Operations for Operations, Plans and Strategy; 2012–2013 | Succeeded by Michelle J. Howard |
| Preceded by Robert Harward | Deputy Commander of the United States Central Command; 2013–2016 | Succeeded by Charles Q. Brown Jr. |
