= Mark Fox (footballer) =

English footballer

Personal information
- Full name: Mark Stephen Fox
- Date of birth: 17 November 1975 (age 50)
- Place of birth: Basingstoke, England
- Height: 5 ft 11 in (1.80 m)
- Position: Midfielder

Senior career*
Years	Team	Apps	(Gls)
1990–1992	Fleet Town		
1992–1997	Brighton & Hove Albion	28	(1)
1997–1999	Bashley	70	(8)
- Basingstoke Town
- St Leonards
- * Club domestic league appearances and goals

Mark Stephen Fox (born 17 November 1975) is an English former professional footballer who played as a midfielder in the Football League for Brighton & Hove Albion.

== Life and career ==
Fox was born in 1975 in Basingstoke, Hampshire, where he attended Brighton Hill School. He played football for Fleet Town before signing for Brighton & Hove Albion in 1994. He made 36 appearances over three seasons with the club, before returning to non-league football with clubs including Bashley, Basingstoke Town, and St Leonards.

Fox's younger brother Simon played alongside him for Brighton & Hove Albion.
