= USS Hué City =

Ticonderoga-class guided missile cruiser

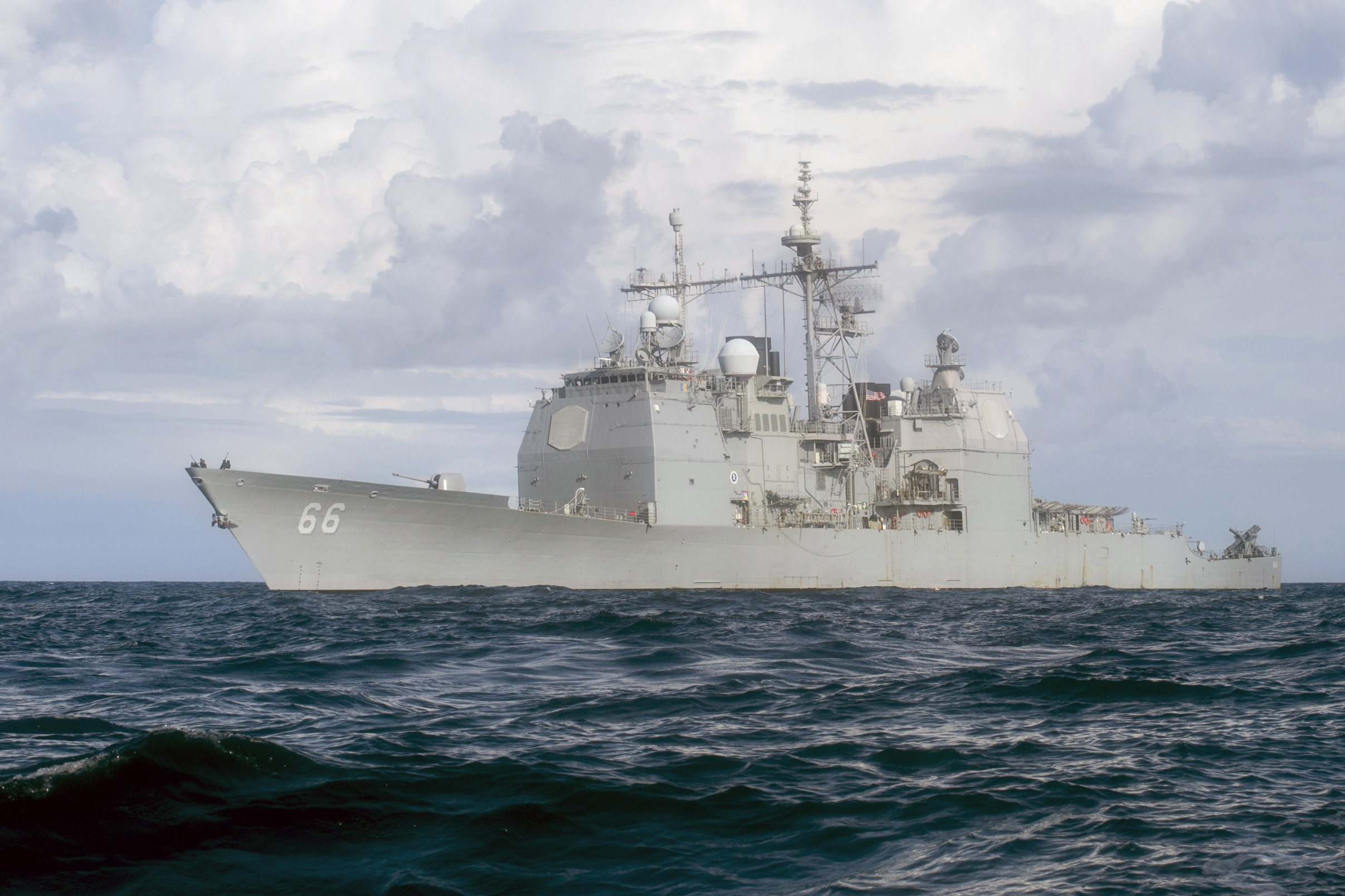
- USS Hué City on 30 September 2016

History

United States
- Name: Hué City
- Namesake: Battle of Hue
- Ordered: 16 April 1987
- Builder: Ingalls Shipbuilding
- Laid down: 20 February 1989
- Launched: 1 June 1990
- Acquired: 28 June 1991
- Commissioned: 14 September 1991
- Decommissioned: 23 September 2022
- Identification: Call sign: NHUE; Hull number: CG-66
- Motto: Fidelity, Courage, Honor
- Status: Stricken, Final Disposition Pending
- Badge

General characteristics
- Class & type: Ticonderoga-class cruiser
- Displacement: Approx. 9,600 long tons (9,800 t) full load
- Length: 567 feet (173 m)
- Beam: 55 feet (16.8 meters)
- Draft: 34 feet (10.2 meters)
- Propulsion: 4 × General Electric LM2500 gas turbine engines; 2 × controllable-reversible pitch propellers; 2 × rudders
- Speed: 32.5 knots (60 km/h; 37.4 mph)
- Complement: 30 officers and 300 enlisted
- Sensors & processing systems: AN/SPY-1A/B multi-function radar; AN/SPS-49 air search radar (Removed on some ships); AN/SPG-62 fire control radar; AN/SPS-73 surface search radar; AN/SPQ-9 gun fire control radar; AN/SQQ-89(V)1/3 - A(V)15 Sonar suite, consisting of: AN/SQS-53B/C/D active sonar; AN/SQR-19 TACTAS, AN/SQR-19B ITASS, & MFTA passive sonar; AN/SQQ-28 light airborne multi-purpose system
- Armament: 2 × 61 cell Mk 41 vertical launch systems containing; 122 × mix of: RIM-66M-5 Standard SM-2MR Block IIIB; RIM-156A SM-2ER Block IV; RIM-161 SM-3; RIM-162A ESSM; RIM-174A Standard ERAM; BGM-109 Tomahawk; RUM-139A VL-ASROC; 8 × RGM-84 Harpoon missiles; 2 × 5 in (127 mm)/62 caliber Mark 45 Mod 4 lightweight gun; 2 × Mk 38 25 mm Machine Gun Systems; 2–4 × .50 in (12.7 mm) cal. machine gun; 2 × Phalanx CIWS Block 1B; 2 × Mk 32 12.75 in (324 mm) triple torpedo tubes
- Aircraft carried: 2 × MH-60R Seahawk LAMPS Mk III helicopters.

USS Hué City (CG-66) is a decommissioned Ticonderoga-class guided missile cruiser that served in the United States Navy. She was ordered 16 April 1987, and laid down 20 February 1989, at Ingalls Shipbuilding, Pascagoula, Mississippi. Hué City was in active service from 14 September 1991 to 23 September 2022. She is named for the Battle of Huế, fought in the city during the Tet Offensive of 1968 by the 1st Marine Regiment (composed of 1st Battalion, 1st Marines, 1st Battalion, 5th Marines, 2nd Battalion, 5th Marines and attached units) during the Vietnam War. The three battalion commanders were the honored guests at her 1991 commissioning.

Hué City is the only U.S. Navy ship named after a battle in the Vietnam War, although it had been planned to name LHA-5 as USS Khe Sanh after the Battle of Khe Sanh, but that ship was commissioned in 1976 as Peleliu. As the only U.S. warship named for a battle that took place during the Vietnam War, Hué City had the opportunity to reach out to the veterans of the battle for which she is named. She frequently held memorials commemorating the Battle of Huế.

Hué City also shares her hull number with guided missile destroyer USS Gonzalez (DDG-66). Notable here is that Gonzalez is named after USMC Sergeant Alfredo Gonzalez, who earned the Medal of Honor for his actions in Operation Hué City.

== Ship history ==
=== 1990s ===
Hué City sailed on 11 March 1993, for her maiden deployment to the Mediterranean Sea as Air Warfare Commander for the Theodore Roosevelt Carrier battle group (CVBG). Principally operating in the Adriatic Sea, Hué City developed the air picture and transmitted it to command centers afloat and shore. Hué City also monitored the safety of United Nations relief flights to Bosnia and Herzegovina, ensuring Serb aircraft did not violate no-fly zones.

While conducting training near Guantanamo Bay, Cuba, in April 1994, Hué City was directed to serve as Destroyer Squadron 22 flagship in support of sanctions against Haiti. Hué City sailed for her second deployment 22 March 1995, with the Theodore Roosevelt CVBG. Hué City took station in the Red Sea, where she provided air coverage to the Combat Air Patrol enforcing the no-fly zone in Southern Iraq.

Hué City sailed for the Baltic Sea on 24 May 1996, to participate in operations involving forty-eight ships from thirteen nations. The operations focused on tracking air, surface, and subsurface targets in a multinational task force. Hué City deployed on 29 April 1997, to the Mediterranean Sea as Air Warfare Commander for the John F. Kennedy CVBG. Hué City operated in the Adriatic Sea, overseeing all air activity in support of naval operations.

In 1999, Hué City sailed for counter-drug operations in the Caribbean Sea. Later that year, Hué City participated in Baltic Operations, a multinational exercise consisting of fifty-three vessels from twelve nations.

=== 2000s ===
Hué City conducted multinational exercises in South America while acting as flagship in UNITAS 2000 Caribbean phase. On 26 June 2000, Hué City sailed to New York City, as the reviewing ship for President Clinton and his family, Secretary of Defense, Secretary of the Navy, Chief of Naval Operations, Commandant of the Marine Corps, and COMCRUDESGRU 12 in the International Naval Review 2000.

As part of the George Washington CVBG, and in response to the terrorist attacks of 11 September 2001, Hué City set sail in support of defense and humanitarian efforts off the coast of New York.

Ships and aircraft of the John F. Kennedy CVBG commenced use of the Vieques Island inner range beginning 24 September 2001, in conjunction with their Composite Unit Training Exercises (COMPUTEX). The exercise, which began the week prior, also utilized the northern and southern Puerto Rico operating areas, and involved complex battle group training events, naval surface fire-support training and air-to-ground bombing.

Hué City then took part in Underway No. 10, one in a series of tests leading to the Cooperative Engagement Capability (CEC) Operation Evaluation (OPEVAL) scheduled for Spring 2001. The CEC system provides the capability to cooperatively engage targets by a warship using data from other CEC-equipped ships, aircraft, and land-based sensors, even in an electronic-jamming environment. It also provides a common, consistent and highly accurate air picture, allowing battle group defenses to act as one seamless system. The test, off Wallops Island, Virginia, simulated missile firings from some of the Navy's most technically advanced ships against unmanned drones.

As part of the John F. Kennedy CVBG, Hué City took part Joint Task Force Exercise (JTFEX) 02-1, with Phase I of the exercise running from January 19 through 26, 2002 and Phase II running 7–14 February 2002.

In March 2002, Hué City was part of John F. Kennedy CVBG at it relieved the Theodore Roosevelt CVBG, in support of Operation Enduring Freedom.

In May 2002, during a three-day Naval Gun Fire Support (NGFS) exercise off the coast of Djibouti, Africa, Hué City fired hundreds of 5-inch rounds in support of Marine Expeditionary Unit Exercise 2002 (MEUEX '02) more than 60 targets that included tanks, bunkers, and various military vehicles. Hué City joined the Wasp Amphibious Ready Group (ARG) and the 22nd Marine Expeditionary Unit to conduct this first of its kind exercise in this little-known region of northeast Africa.

=== 2010s ===
Prior to 2014, she successfully completed consecutive deployments to the Persian Gulf and North Arabian Sea.

On 14 April 2014, Monday evening, a fire broke out at just after 6:20 p.m. local time while Hué City was steaming about 200 nautical miles northeast of Bermuda. The crew fought and defeated a major fire in one of the main engineering spaces without suffering any injuries. The ship's executive officer was relieved by the head of Carrier Strike Group 8 in June 2014 for "failing to ensure his crew properly stowed hazardous materials" which subsequently caught fire. According to the investigation report, bales of rags caught fire after they had been improperly stored in an exhaust uptake trunk. The fire caused over $23 million in damage and required over 9 months of repairs. It also caused Hué City to miss the planned deployment to Europe.

=== 2020s ===
In December 2020 the U.S. Navy's Report to Congress on the Annual Long-Range Plan for Construction of Naval Vessels stated that the ship was planned to be placed Out of Commission in Reserve in 2022.

On 23 September 2022, the Navy held a decommissioning ceremony for Hué City at Naval Station Norfolk.

== Awards ==
Hué City has received the following awards:

- Meritorious Unit Commendation, as part of TG 20.15 from 8 May 2000 to 14 May 2001
- Meritorious Unit Commendation, as part of TF 60 from 1 April 2002 to 30 September 2002
- Meritorious Unit Commendation, as part of COMCARSTRKGRU 8 from 1 October 2011 to 3 July 2013
- Armed Forces Service Medal for a number of periods relating to Bosnia from March to July 1993, June to September 1995 and June to August 1997.
- Navy E Ribbon, 13 awards. 1994, 1995, 1996, 1998, 1999, 2000, 2001, 2003, 2007, 2008, 2010, 2011 and 2012.
