= Brian Fort =

Retired U.S. Navy admiral

Brian P. Fort
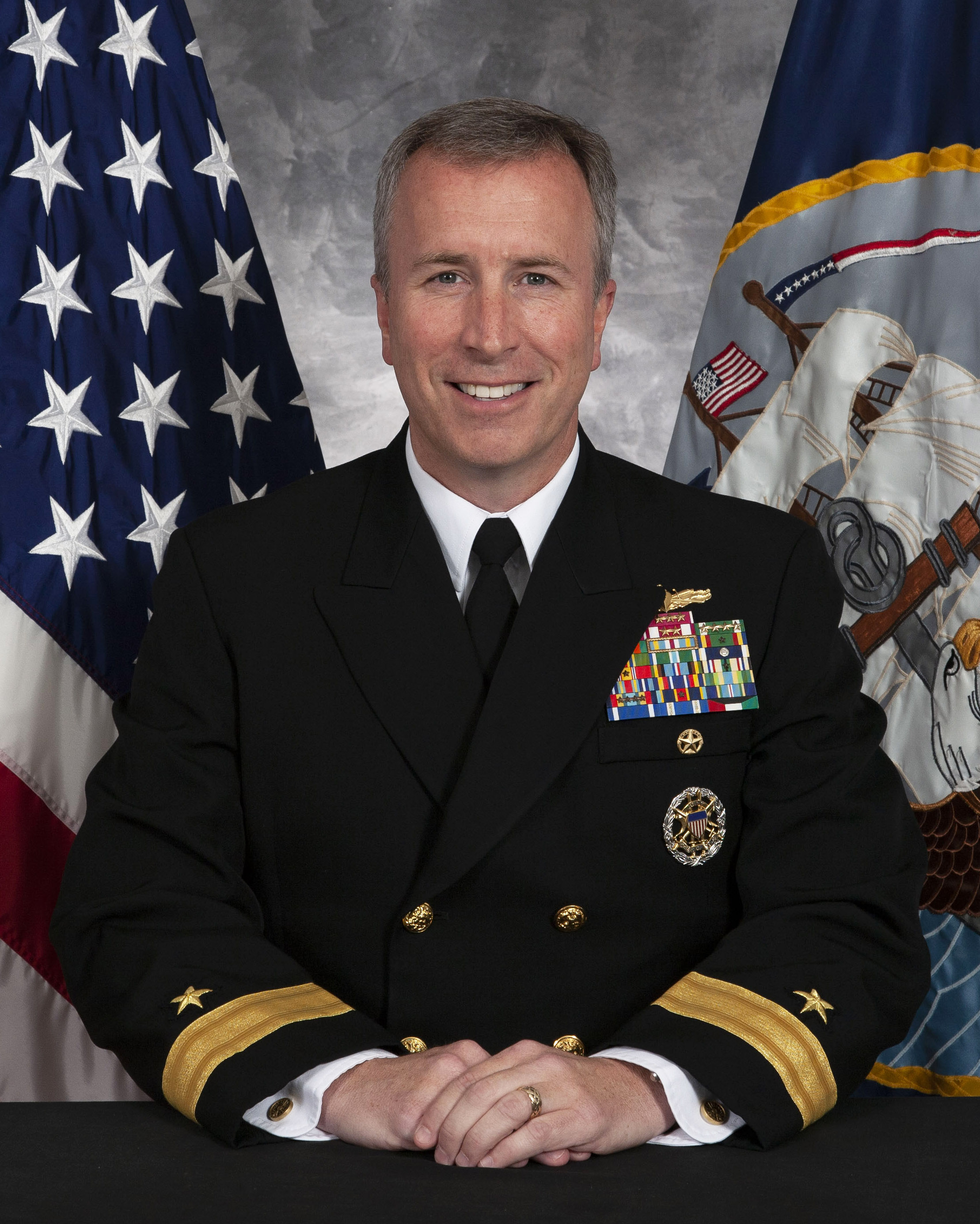
- Born: 1966 (age 59–60)
- Education: University of Arkansas (BS); Naval War College (MNSS); Joint Forces Staff College
- Military career
- Allegiance: United States
- Branch: United States Navy
- Service years: 1990–2021
- Rank: Rear Admiral (lower half)
- Commands: United States Naval Forces Japan; Navy Region Japan; Navy Region Hawaii; Naval Surface Group Middle Pacific; Navy Nuclear Power Training Unit, Ballston Spa; Destroyer Squadron 26; USS Gonzalez (DDG-66)
- Awards: Navy Distinguished Service Medal; Legion of Merit (4); Order of the Rising Sun

Brian Patrick Fort (born 1966) is a retired United States Navy rear admiral and surface warfare officer who last served as the 35th commander of the United States Naval Forces Japan and commander of Navy Region Japan from July 10, 2019 to July 14, 2021. As CNFJ/CNRJ, Fort was responsible for providing shore readiness to U.S. naval forces in Japan and maritime support to the American forward presence in Japan as well as cooperation with the Japan Maritime Self-Defense Force to promote regional stability and deter aggression. He previously served as commander of Navy Region Hawaii and Naval Surface Group Middle Pacific from August 2017 to June 2019, with tours as commodore of Destroyer Squadron 26 from June 2013 to June 2015 and commanding officer of USS Gonzalez (DDG-66) from February 2008 to August 2009.

In March 2021, Carl Lahti, former commandant of Naval District Washington was assigned to succeed Fort as commander of United States Naval Forces Japan and Navy Region Japan. The change of command ceremony took place on July 14, 2021, with Fort retiring from active duty after 32 years of distinguished service.

== Early life and education ==
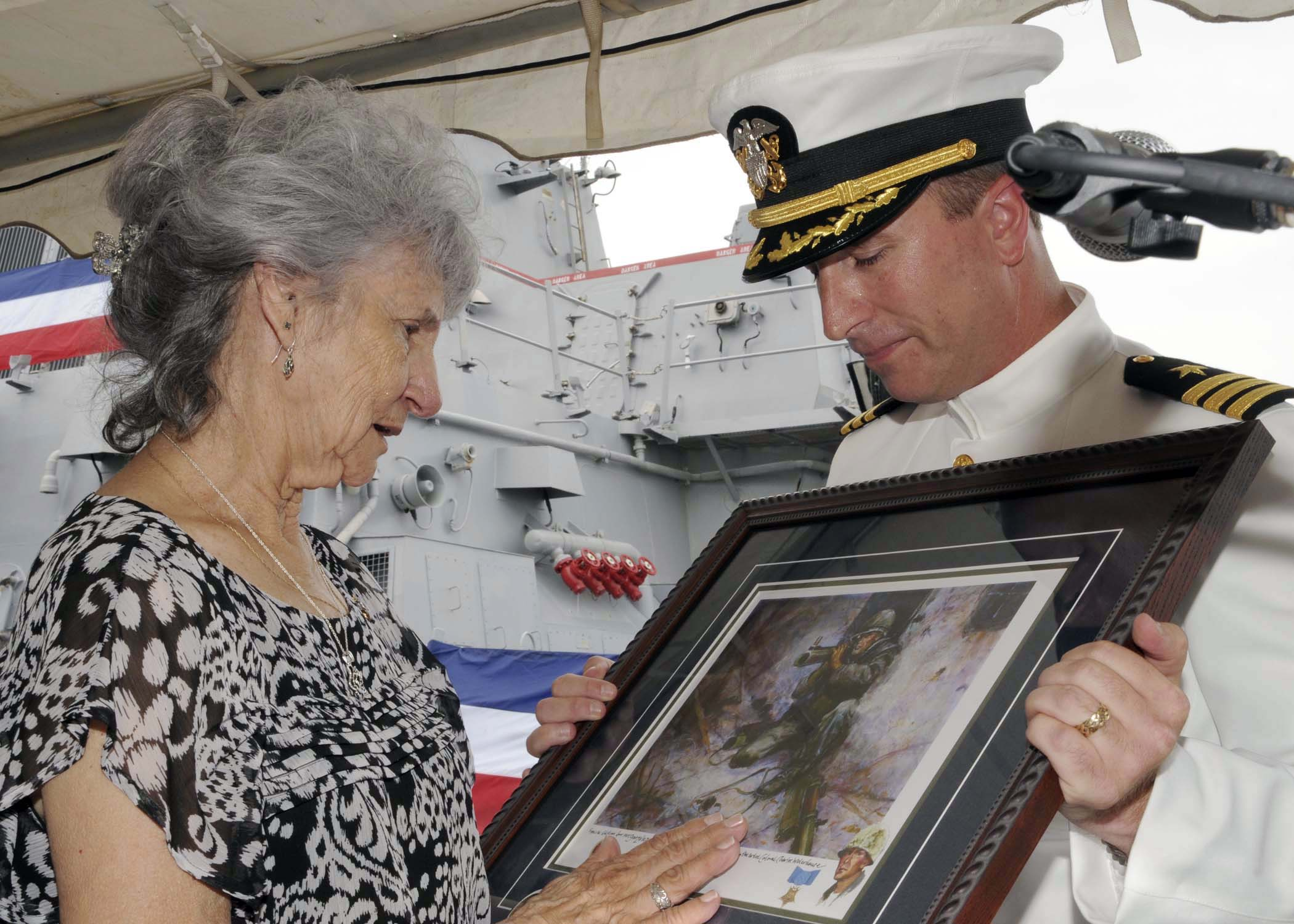
Cmdr. Brian Fort, commanding officer of the Arleigh Burke-class guided-missile destroyer USS Gonzalez (DDG 66), presents Dolia Gonzalez with a painting of her son, Marine Corps Sgt. Freddy Gonzalez, before turning command of the ship over to Cmdr. Lynn Acheson at Naval Station Norfolk.

Raised in Little Rock, Arkansas, Fort received his commission via Officer Candidate School in 1990. He earned a master's degree from the Naval War College in National Security and Strategic Studies and is also a graduate of the Joint Forces Staff College.

== USS Fitzgerald collision investigation ==
Fort was selected to lead the U.S. Navy's investigation into the collision of the USS Fitzgerald (DDG-62) with a civilian merchant ship in June 2017. The sudden assignment resulted in the cancellation of the planned Navy Region Hawaii change of command ceremony with John V. Fuller, who assumed command forgoing the ceremony.

== Awards and decorations ==

Surface Warfare Officer Pin
Navy Distinguished Service Medal	Legion of Merit with three award stars	Defense Meritorious Service Medal
Meritorious Service Medal with two award stars	Navy and Marine Corps Commendation Medal with four award stars	Navy and Marine Corps Achievement Medal
Joint Meritorious Unit Award	Navy Unit Commendation with bronze service star	Navy Meritorious Unit Commendation with bronze service star
Coast Guard Meritorious Unit Commendation	Navy "E" Ribbon, 4th award	National Defense Service Medal with bronze service star
Armed Forces Expeditionary Medal	Southwest Asia Service Medal with bronze service star	Global War on Terrorism Expeditionary Medal
Global War on Terrorism Service Medal	Armed Forces Service Medal	Navy Sea Service Deployment Ribbon with four bronze service stars
Navy and Marine Corps Overseas Service Ribbon with bronze service star	Special Operations Service Ribbon	NATO Medal for the former Yugoslavia
NATO Medal Ribbon (non-Article 5 version)	Order of the Rising Sun, 2nd Class	Kuwait Liberation Medal (Kuwait)
Command at Sea insignia
Office of the Joint Chiefs of Staff Identification Badge

Military offices
Preceded by R. Alistair Borchert	Commanding Officer of USS Gonzalez (DDG-66); 2008-2010	Succeeded by Lynn Acheson
Preceded by Nelson C. Castro	Commodore of Destroyer Squadron 26; 2013-2015	Succeeded by William S. Switzer
Preceded by John V. Fuller	Commander of Navy Region Hawaii; 2017-2019	Succeeded by Robert Chadwick II
Preceded by Gregory J. Fenton	Commander of the United States Naval Forces Japan and Navy Region Japan; 2019-2021	Succeeded by Carl A. Lahti
