= Carl Lahti =

U.S. Navy admiral

Carl A. Lahti
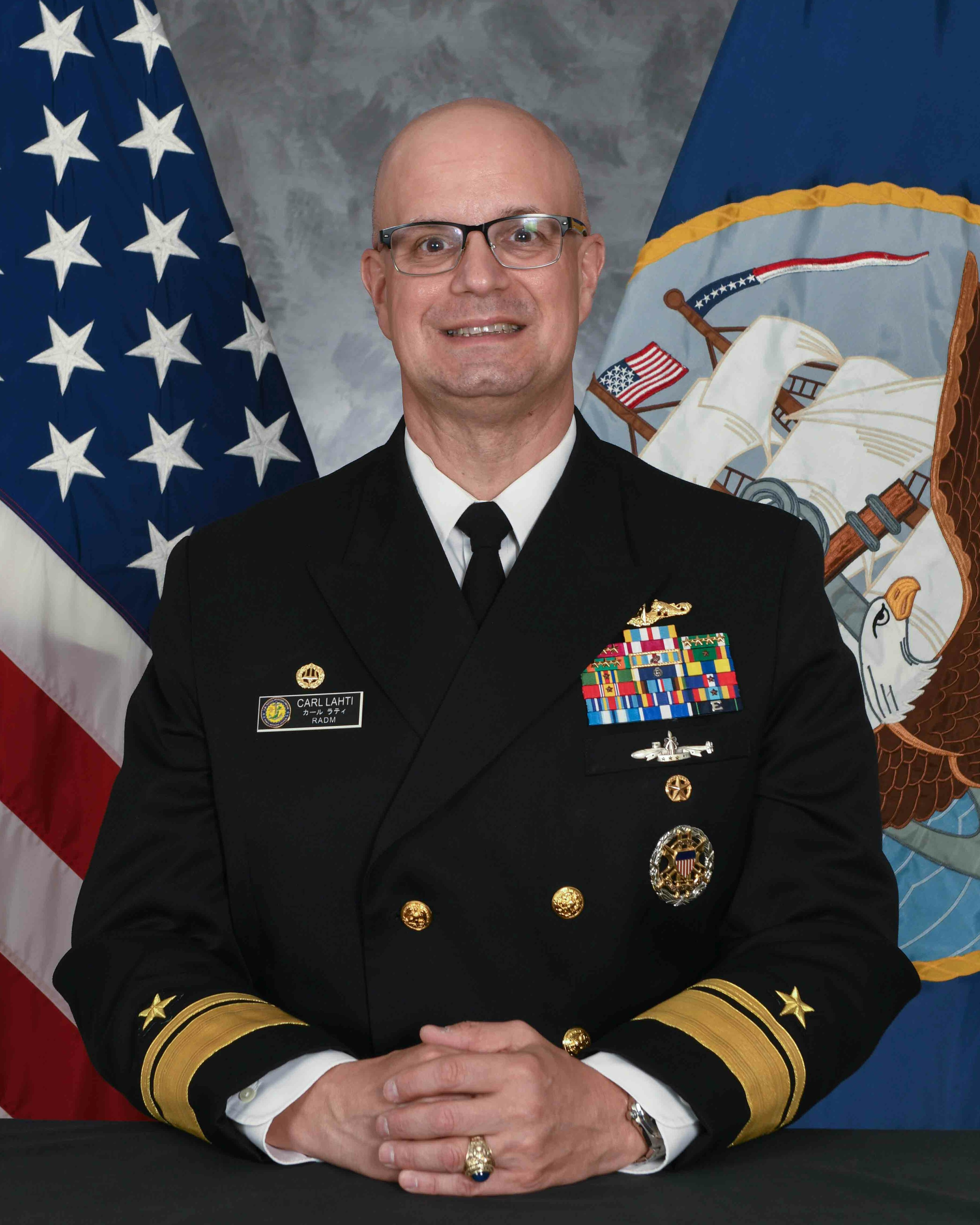
- Born: 1967 (age 58–59)
- Education: United States Naval Academy (BS); Naval Postgraduate School (MS); Naval War College (MA)
- Military career
- Allegiance: United States
- Branch: United States Navy
- Service years: 1989–present
- Rank: Rear Admiral
- Commands: Navy Region Mid-Atlantic; United States Naval Forces Japan; Navy Region Japan; Naval District Washington; Naval Submarine Base New London; USS Nebraska (SSBN-739)
- Awards: Defense Superior Service Medal; Legion of Merit (4)

Carl Andrew Lahti (born 1967) is a United States Navy rear admiral and submarine warfare officer who has served as the commander of Navy Region Mid-Atlantic since July 3, 2024. He most recently served as the 36th commander of the United States Naval Forces Japan and commander of Navy Region Japan from 2021 to 2024. He served as the 91st commandant of Naval District Washington and deputy commander of the Joint Force Headquarters National Capital Region from 2018 to 2021.

Prior to this assignment, Lahti served as director of energy and environmental readiness of the United States Navy, with command tours as commanding officer of the USS Nebraska (SSBN-739) from 2006 to 2009 and the 50th commander of Naval Submarine Base New London from 2013 to 2015.

Raised in Buffalo, New York, Lahti graduated from the United States Naval Academy in 1989 with a B.S. degree in systems engineering. He later earned an M.S. degree in electrical engineering from the Naval Postgraduate School in 1996 and an M.A. degree in national security and strategic studies from the Naval War College.

In March 2022, he was nominated for promotion to rear admiral. The promotion became effective on April 1, 2022.

In March 2024, he was assigned as the commander of Navy Region Mid-Atlantic.

== Awards and decorations ==
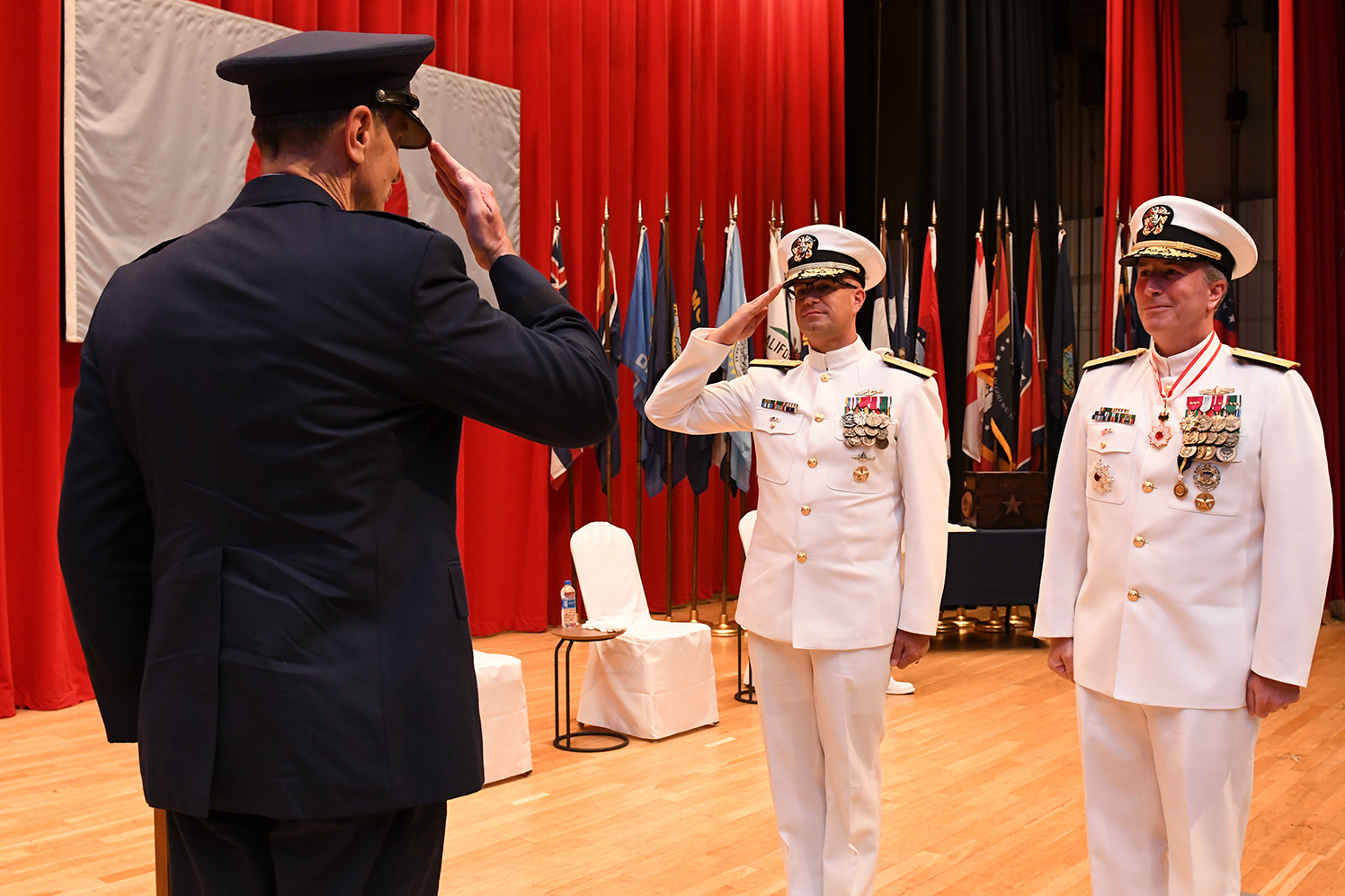
Lahti (center) salutes Lt. Gen. Kevin B. Schneider (left), commander of Fifth Air Force and United States Forces Japan after assuming command of United States Naval Forces Japan and Navy Region Japan from Rear Adm. Brian P. Fort (right) on July 14, 2021.

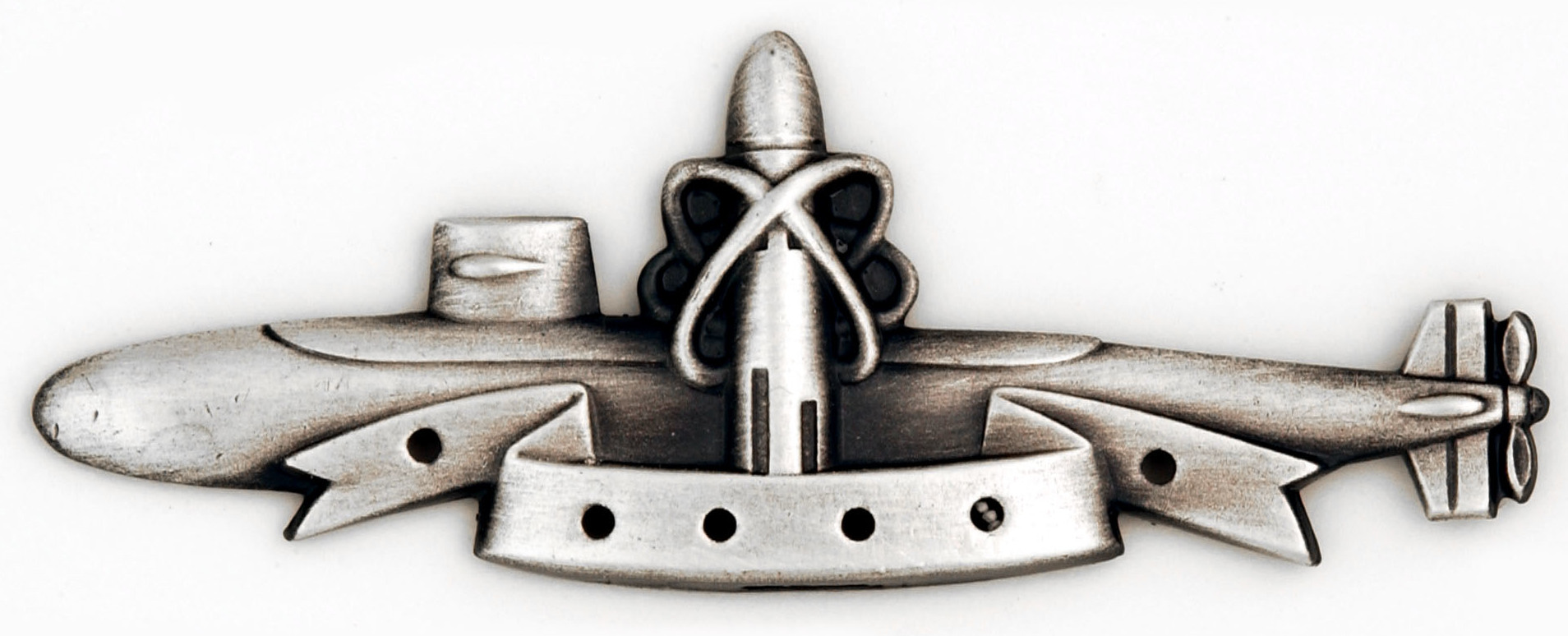

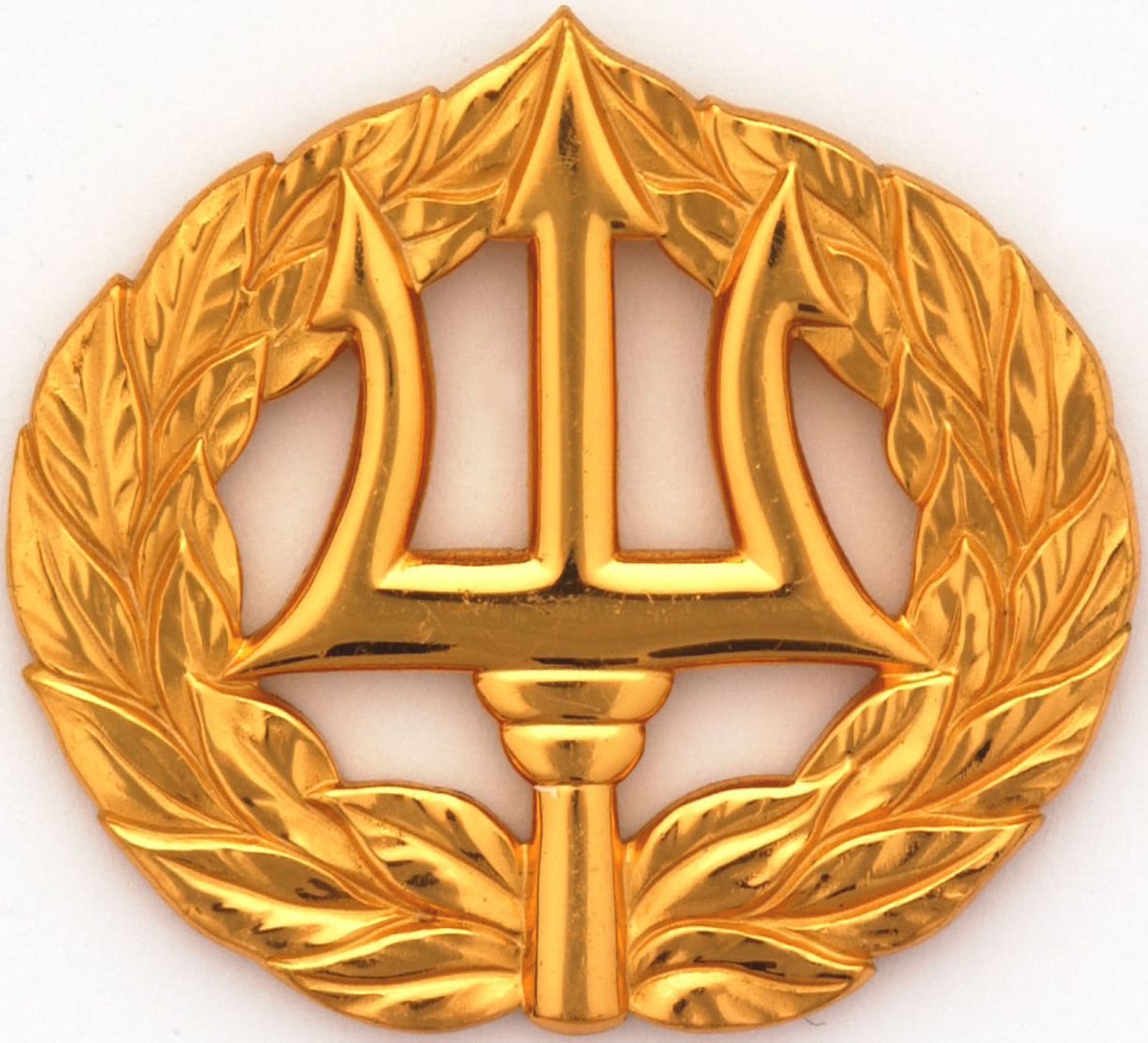

Submarine Warfare Officer Insignia
Defense Superior Service Medal
Legion of Merit with four award stars	Meritorious Service Medal	Navy and Marine Corps Commendation Medal with award star
Navy and Marine Corps Achievement Medal with three award stars	Joint Meritorious Unit Award	Navy Unit Commendation
Navy Meritorious Unit Commendation	Navy "E" Ribbon, 2nd award	Navy Expeditionary Medal
National Defense Service Medal with bronze service star	Armed Forces Expeditionary Medal	Kosovo Campaign Medal
Global War on Terrorism Expeditionary Medal	Global War on Terrorism Service Medal	Navy Sea Service Deployment Ribbon with bronze service star
Navy Arctic Service Ribbon	NATO Medal for Kosovo	Navy Expert Pistol Shot Medal
SSBN Deterrent Patrol Insignia in silver with two gold and one silver service stars
Command at Sea insignia		Command Ashore insignia
Office of the Joint Chiefs of Staff Identification Badge

Military offices
Preceded by Mark W. Denno	Commander of Naval Submarine Base New London; 2013–2015	Succeeded by Paul Whitescarver
Preceded by Charles W. Rock	Commandant of Naval District Washington and Deputy Commander of the Joint Force Headquarters National Capital Region; 2018–2021	Succeeded by Michael J. Steffen
Preceded by Brian P. Fort	Commander of United States Naval Forces Japan and Navy Region Japan; 2021–2024	Succeeded by Ian L. Johnson
Preceded by Wesley R. McCall	Commander of Navy Region Mid-Atlantic; 2024–present	Incumbent
