= Destroyer Squadron 26 =

Destroyer Squadron Twenty-Six
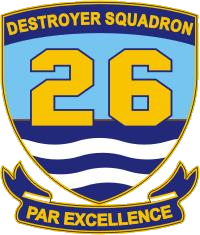
- Founded: 1950; 76 years ago
- Country: United States
- Branch: United States Navy
- Type: Destroyer squadron
- Role: Naval surface/strike/anti-aircraft warfare
- Part of: Carrier Strike Group Ten; Commander, Naval Surface Force Atlantic
- Garrison/HQ: Norfolk Naval Base, Virginia, US
- Motto: Par Excellence
- Engagements: Korean War; Vietnam War; Global War on Terrorism; War in Afghanistan; Iraq War; Operation Iraqi Freedom; Operation New Dawn
- Website: Official website

Commanders
- Commodore: CAPT Peter F. Halvorsen, USN
- Deputy commodore: CAPT Peter Halvorsen, USN
- Senior enlisted adviser: CMDCM Damien Williams, USN

Destroyer Squadron 26 (DESRON 26) is a destroyer squadron of the United States Navy. It was first created in 1950. It has seen action in the Korean War, service in the Atlantic, and in the Vietnam War. For a period (1971 until 1974), it became the 'Mod Squad', trialing ships commanded by officers one rank junior to the usual appointment rank.

== Composition ==
As of 2026 the squadron comprises:

- Squadron Headquarters, at Naval Station Norfolk
- USS Mason (DDG-87)
- USS Nitze (DDG-94)
- USS James E. Williams (DDG-95)
- USS Truxtun (DDG-103)
- USS Delbert D. Black (DDG-119)

== History ==
In 1950, four general purpose destroyers were grouped into Destroyer Squadron Twenty-Six, which saw combat action in the Korean War until 1952. Following the end of the Korean War, the squadron departed the Pacific for a new homeport in Norfolk, Virginia. By 1957 Destroyer Squadron 26 consisted of two divisions Destroyer Division 261 and Destroyer Division 262. Destroyer Division 262 consisted of four ships; the destroyers USS Corry (DDR-817), USS C. P. Cecil (DDR-835), USS Stickell (DDR-888), and USS O'Hare (DDR-889). On February 6, 1961 I went aboard USS Corry (DDR-817) the day she returned to D&S Piers Norfolk from a Med Cruise. Corry was in DESRON 26, DESDIV 262. Commander H.W. Hiller was the CO and LCDR Crevier was XO.' In July 1964, Destroyer Squadron TWENTY-SIX became one of the Navy's three all guided missile squadrons consisting of six modern and versatile destroyers. The squadron also saw combat action off Vietnam with the US Pacific Fleet from 1964 to 1970. From 1971 to 1974, Destroyer Squadron 26 was selected by the Chief of Naval Operations, Admiral Elmo Zumwalt, to evaluate a new manning concept in which ships would be manned and commanded by outstanding officers one rank junior to those normally assigned. This "Mod Squad," as it was nicknamed, initiated the "Go Navy" cruise recruiting program with 626 prospective recruits embarked in the squadron's ships conducting operations off Newport, Rhode Island. On 1 January 1971, USS Blandy (DD-943) joined the squadron.

Since 1974, Destroyer Squadron 26 has participated in the first Anti-Air Warfare Training Ship Program, the first Atlantic Fleet Open Ocean Mobile Sea Range Operation, Operation Sail ("Review of the Tall Ships"), and the 1976 NATO Firepower Demonstration, operating with the United States Second Fleet. In April 1978, Destroyer Squadrons in the Atlantic were reorganized and Destroyer Squadron 26 was designated a tactical squadron. As such, it was responsible for the "at-sea" training and operations of destroyers and frigates during exercises and deployments, while administrative responsibilities were assigned to readiness squadrons who remained in homeport. In September 1995, as a result of the reorganization of Commander, Naval Surface Force Atlantic, destroyer squadrons became permanent Immediate Superior In Command (ISIC) to all destroyers and frigates. This reorganization replaced all tactical destroyer squadrons and readiness squadrons and combined the duties and responsibilities of the two into the new destroyer squadron. USS Barry (DDG-52) was under command of (tactical) Destroyer Squadron 26 in 1993, 1994 and 1995, while administratively part of Destroyer Squadron 2. From August 31, 1995, in accordance with the reorganization, Destroyer Squadron 26 was to oversee the combat readiness of four ships, USS Barry (DDG-52), USS Arthur W. Radford (DD-968), USS Comte de Grasse (DD-974), and USS Samuel B. Roberts (FFG-58).

In July 1996 the squadron deployed with the USS George Washington Battle Group, completing a highly successful Black Sea visit. During the visit it made port visits to Varna, Bulgaria; Constanta, Romania; and Odessa, Ukraine. By the end of the deployment, DESRON 26 ships had participated in 13 major exercises. DESRON 26 crew members participated in community relations projects such as painting, electrical and mechanical repairs and lawn work. When visiting high school students, "...Sailors shared stories about growing up in America."

In 2005 the squadron was made up of USS Barry (DDG-52), USS Mahan (DDG-72), USS Mason (DDG-87), and USS Kauffman (FFG-59). Squadron duties also include the stewardship and oversight of training, material readiness, maintenance, and the personnel of the assigned ships. In 2010–11, whether deployed or in homeport (Norfolk, VA), DESRON 26 reported administratively and operationally to Commander Carrier Strike Group Ten. In 2012, USS Gettysburg (CG-64) and Mitscher were detached from Destroyer Squadron 22 to Destroyer Squadron 26 for the UK's Joint Warrior 12-2 exercise.

=== Activities from 2010 ===
In 2013 Destroyer Squadron 26's mission was officially described as to conduct underway operations and exercise tactical control of destroyers, frigates, submarines, and aircraft during peace and wartime operations.

When deployed as part of a carrier strike group, the squadron commander serves as Alternate Composite Warfare Commander (CWC) and Sea Combat Commander (SCC). The SCC is responsible for performing numerous roles within the Strike Group, including Undersea Warfare Commander, Surface Warfare Commander, Submarine Operations Coordinating Authority, Maritime Interception Operations Commander, and Screen Coordinator. During underway operations separate from the carrier strike group, the squadron commander may also serve as a Joint or naval Task Group Commander.

Squadron duties also include the stewardship and oversight of training, material readiness, maintenance, and the personnel of the assigned ships. Whether deployed or in its homeport, Norfolk, Virginia, the squadron reports administratively and operationally to Commander Carrier Strike Group Ten.

As of 2016, Destroyer Squadron 26 consisted of the Arleigh Burke-class destroyers USS Nitze (DDG-94), USS Mason (DDG-87), USS Oscar Austin (DDG-79), USS McFaul (DDG-74), USS Stout (DDG-55), and USS Barry (DDG-52).

On 14 March 2014, US warships under Destroyer Squadron 26 set sail for Scotland to participate NATO exercise Joint Warrior 14–2, a semi-annual United Kingdom-led training exercise designed to prepare NATO and allied forces for global operations. Joint Warrior 14-2 will involve air, naval, and ground forces from Belgium, Canada, Denmark, France, Germany, Greece, the Netherlands, Norway, Sweden, New Zealand, Turkey, the United Kingdom, and the United States.

== Commanders ==
Commanders of the squadron include:

- June 2013 – 2015 Captain Brian Fort
- 2015–2018 Captain William S. Switzer
- 2018–2019 Captain Chris H. Innskeep
- 2019–2020 Captain William K. Shafley
- 2020-2021 Captain Zoah Scheneman
- 2021–2022 Captain Frank Brandon
- 2022-present Captain Stephen Aldridge
