= John V. Fuller =

U.S. Navy Admiral (born 1965)

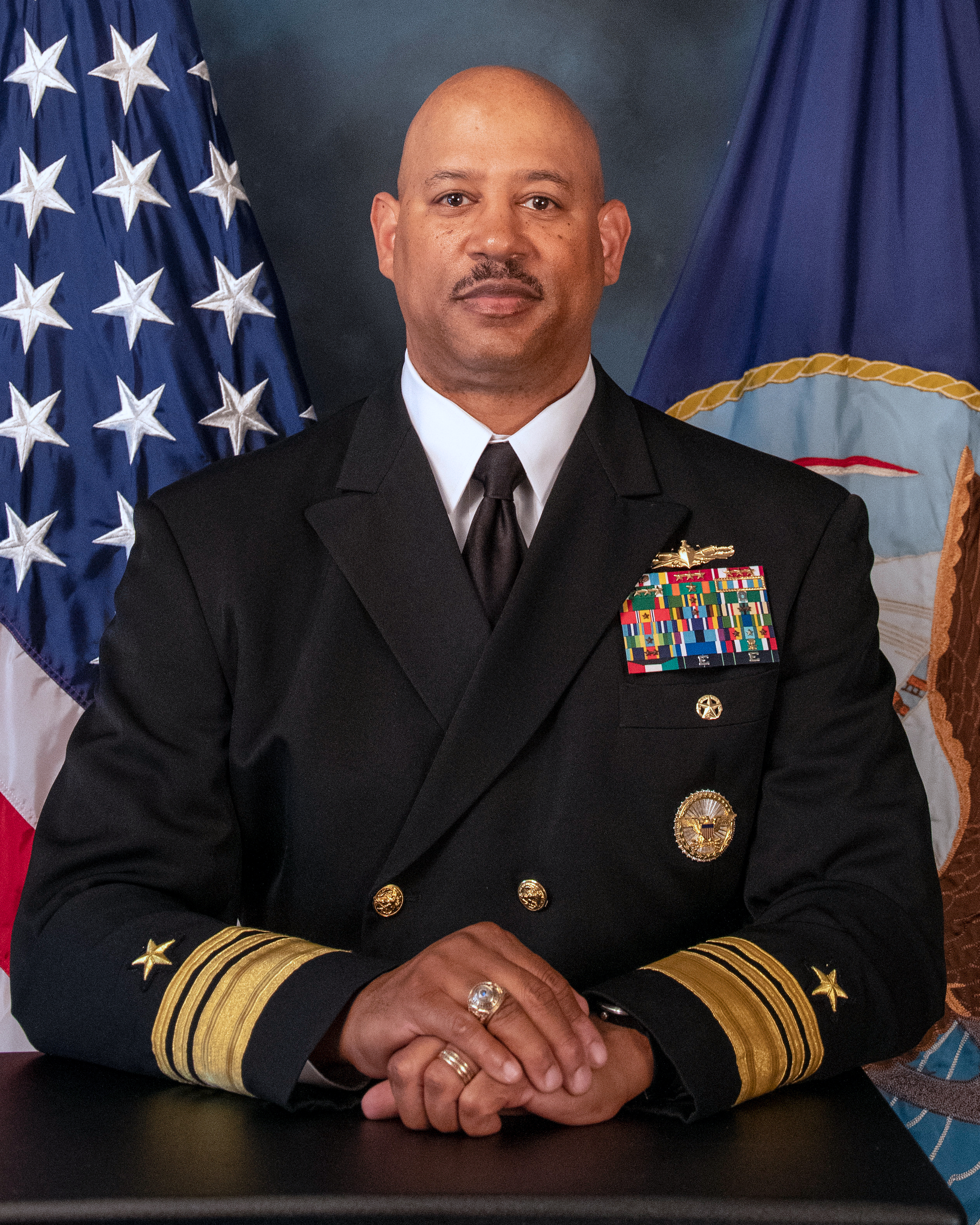
- Born: 1965 (age 60–61)
- Education: United States Naval Academy (BS); Naval Postgraduate School (MS); College of Naval Command and Staff (MA)
- Military career
- Allegiance: United States of America
- Branch: United States Navy
- Service years: 1987–2025
- Rank: Vice Admiral
- Commands: Carrier Strike Group 1 Naval Surface Group, Middle Pacific; Navy Region Hawaii; Destroyer Squadron 22; Task Group-Iraqi Maritime; USS Mason (DDG-87)
- Awards: Defense Superior Service Medal; Legion of Merit (4); Defense Meritorious Service Medal (4)

John Vincent Fuller (born 1965) is a retired United States Navy vice admiral who served as the 42nd Naval Inspector General since 11 June 2021. Prior to that, Fuller served as deputy director for force protection of the Joint Staff and before that as the director of strategy, plans, and policy of the United States Northern Command.

As the deputy director for force protection (DDFP), Fuller led three force protection divisions which include the Joint Integrated Air and Missile Defense Organization (JIAMDO) that is responsible for the advocacy and integration of Joint IAMD capabilities; Force Protection Division which identifies and develops joint requirements for asset and personnel protection; and serves as director, Joint Requirements Office for Chemical, Biological, Radiological, and Nuclear Defense (JRO-CBRND), a Chairman's Controlled Activity (CCA). Fuller also serves as the chairman of the protection Functional Capabilities Board.

== Education ==
He received his commission from the US Naval Academy on May 20, 1987. He earned a Bachelor of Science in political science from the Naval Academy and a Master of Science in management from the Naval Post Graduate School. He also earned a Master of Arts in national security and strategic studies from the College of Naval Command and Staff at the Naval War College. He is a Massachusetts Institute of Technology Seminar XXI Fellow.

== Military career ==
Fuller's sea duty tours include damage control assistant, combat information center officer and assistant engineering officer, USS Vandegrift (FFG-48); chief engineer, USS Kauffman (FFG-59); Atlantic Fleet Propulsion Examining Board; flag secretary, Amphibious Force, U.S. 7th Fleet; executive officer aboard USS Curtis Wilbur (DDG-54); commanding officer, USS Mason (DDG-87); deputy commander, Destroyer Squadron 22; commander, Task Group-Iraqi Maritime; and commander, Destroyer Squadron 22.

Ashore, he served in numerous joint and staff billets to include, Plans & Policy/Community Issues Section head and Strategy & Alignment Branch head, Surface Warfare Division; U.S. Naval Academy 4th Battalion Officer; military assistant to the director, rapid fielding in the Office of the Secretary of Defense (AT&L); special assistant to the Littoral Combat Ship (LCS)/Joint High Speed Vessel Council chairman, Navy Staff; operational definition team lead for the Small Surface Combatant Task Force; and deputy for LCS, Surface Warfare Division.

As a flag officer, he first served as commander of Navy Region Hawaii and Naval Surface Group, Middle Pacific.

Fuller assumed command of Carrier Strike Group 1 on 18 July 2017. He held that position until 2018 when he was replaced by Rear Admiral Alvin Holsey. He then served as the director of Strategy, policy & plans (J5), North American Aerospace Defense Command and U.S. Northern Command at Peterson Air Force Base, Colorado. Since 27 August 2020, he has served as the deputy director for force protection of the Joint Staff.

In April 2021, Fuller was nominated for promotion to vice admiral and assigned to replace Vice Admiral Richard P. Snyder as the Naval Inspector General. His nomination was confirmed by the United States Senate on 29 April. He assumed the position on 11 June 2021.

== Personal life ==
As a senior, Fuller played defensive end for the 1986 Navy Midshipmen football team.

Military offices
Preceded by Richard L. Williams Jr.	Commander of Navy Region Hawaii; 2015–2017	Succeeded by Brian P. Fort
Preceded by James Kilby	Commander of Carrier Strike Group 1; 2017–2018	Succeeded by Alvin Holsey
Preceded by Richard P. Snyder	Director of Strategy, Plans, and Policy of the United States Northern Command; 2018–2020	Succeeded by Daniel Cheever
Preceded by Sean A. Gainey	Deputy Director for Force Protection of the Joint Staff; 2020–2021	Succeeded by Rodney D. Lewis
Preceded by Richard P. Snyder	Naval Inspector General; 2021-present	Incumbent
