= Lee Ping Quan =

Chinese-American chef

Lee Ping Quan (1891–1943) was a Chinese-American chef and steward known for his culinary expertise, particularly during his service aboard the USS Mayflower, the presidential yacht, in the early 20th century.

== Early life and education ==
Born in 1891 in Canton, China, Quan was brought to the Philippines by his parents at the age of two. He attended a cooking school in Manila for five years, mastering various culinary skills such as making almond candies, chocolate drops, and sponge cake. His training aimed to assist his uncle, Li Wan Sun, the head of the pastry department in a Chinese hotel.

== Career ==
Joining the Navy at the young age of 14, Quan served on the torpedo boat Decatur at the Philippine Naval Base of Cavite. He later transferred to the USS Barry, actively engaged in convoy duty during World War I. Quan's exceptional culinary skills led to his appointment as an officers' steward, earning him widespread acclaim within naval circles by 1922. His rise was attributed to his habit of exploring restaurants in different ports, drawing inspiration for his culinary creations.

General John Pershing, a distinguished American military leader who commanded the American Expeditionary Force in World War I, once sampled Quan's food. Impressed, Pershing remarked, "If such delicious food was served to our doughboys, we would have won the war long ago."

Quan's culinary talent caught the attention of President Warren G. Harding, who appointed him as the personal chef on the Mayflower, where he served for eight years. During this time, Quan orchestrated elaborate dinners for President Calvin Coolidge of up to 20 courses, blending American and Cantonese cuisines – like fried soft shelled crab on corn cakes, roasted capon with cranberry sauce and chicken chop suey with rice, bamboo shoots and tomato salad.

When Hoover became president, he issued orders that the Mayflower be put out of commission in order to save $300,000 yearly upkeep. Quan reached the retirement period of 20 years of naval service. Subsequently, he opened his own restaurant Quan on West Fifty-First Street in New York City in 1929. He designed the restaurant to resemble the presidential yacht, offering patrons an experience reminiscent of his time serving the presidents. However, despite his efforts, the restaurant faced financial challenges, leading to its closure and his bankruptcy by the end of the year.

In 1939, he authored a cookbook titled To a President's Taste: Being the Reminiscences and Recipes of Lee Ping Quan, Ex-President's Steward on the Presidential Yacht, U.S.S. Mayflower (1939) This cookbook, featuring recipes such as shrimp à la king in puff pastry, became a notable contribution to the world of presidential cuisine.

== Death ==
In his later years, Quan faced personal hardships, including the destruction of his investments in China during the Japanese occupation. At the age of 61, he sought to return to active service in the Navy, but his application was declined due to his age. Quan died in 1943 at Bellevue Hospital, receiving a military funeral in recognition of his service.
