= Ronald A. Boxall =

U.S. Navy admiral (born 1963)

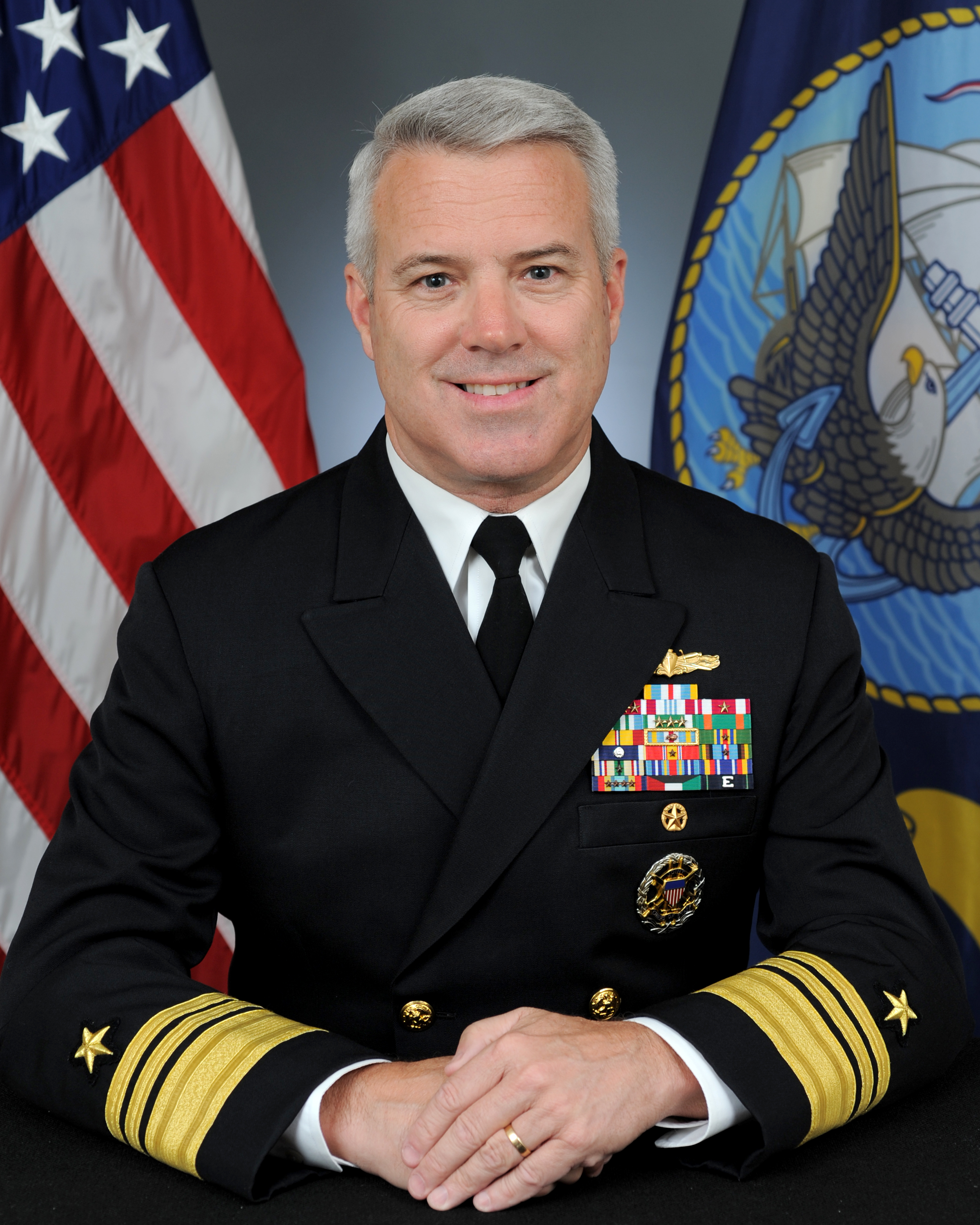
- Born: 1963 (age 62–63)
- Military career
- Allegiance: United States
- Branch: United States Navy
- Service years: 1984–2022
- Rank: Vice Admiral
- Commands: Carrier Strike Group 3 USS Lake Erie; USS Carney
- Conflicts: Gulf War
- Awards: Navy Distinguished Service Medal; Defense Superior Service Medal; Legion of Merit (3)

Ronald Alan Boxall (born 1963) is a retired United States Navy vice admiral who last served as the director for force structure, resources, and assessment of the Joint Staff. He was raised in Holland Patent, New York and graduated from Pennsylvania State University with a B.S. degree in science in 1984. Boxall later earned an M.S. degree in information systems from the Naval Postgraduate School and an M.A. degree in national security and strategic studies from the Naval War College.

== Awards and decorations ==

Surface Warfare Officer Pin
Navy Distinguished Service Medal		Defense Superior Service Medal
Legion of Merit with three gold award stars	Defense Meritorious Service Medal	Meritorious Service Medal with award star
Joint Service Commendation Medal	Navy and Marine Corps Commendation Medal with three award stars	Navy and Marine Corps Achievement Medal
Navy Combat Action Ribbon	Joint Meritorious Unit Award with bronze oak leaf cluster	Navy Meritorious Unit Commendation with bronze service star
Navy "E" Ribbon, 4th award	National Defense Service Medal with bronze service star	Armed Forces Expeditionary Medal with bronze service star
Southwest Asia Service Medal with silver service star	Global War on Terrorism Expeditionary Medal	Global War on Terrorism Service Medal
Navy Sea Service Deployment Ribbon with four bronze service stars	Kuwait Liberation Medal (Kuwait)	Navy Expert Pistol Shot Medal
Command at Sea insignia
Office of the Joint Chiefs of Staff Identification Badge

Military offices
Preceded by Richard P. Snyder	Director for Joint Strategic Planning of the Joint Staff; 2012–2014	Succeeded by Christopher P. McPadden
Preceded by Michael E. Smith	Commander of the Carrier Strike Group 3; 2014–2016	Succeeded by Marcus A. Hitchcock
Preceded by RADM Tom Rowden	Director of Surface Warfare of the United States Navy; 2016–2019	Succeeded by Eugene H. Black III
Preceded by Anthony R. Ierardi	Director for Force Structure, Resources, and Assessment of the Joint Staff; 2019–2022	Succeeded by Sara A. Joyner
