= Battenberg Cup =

United States Naval Award

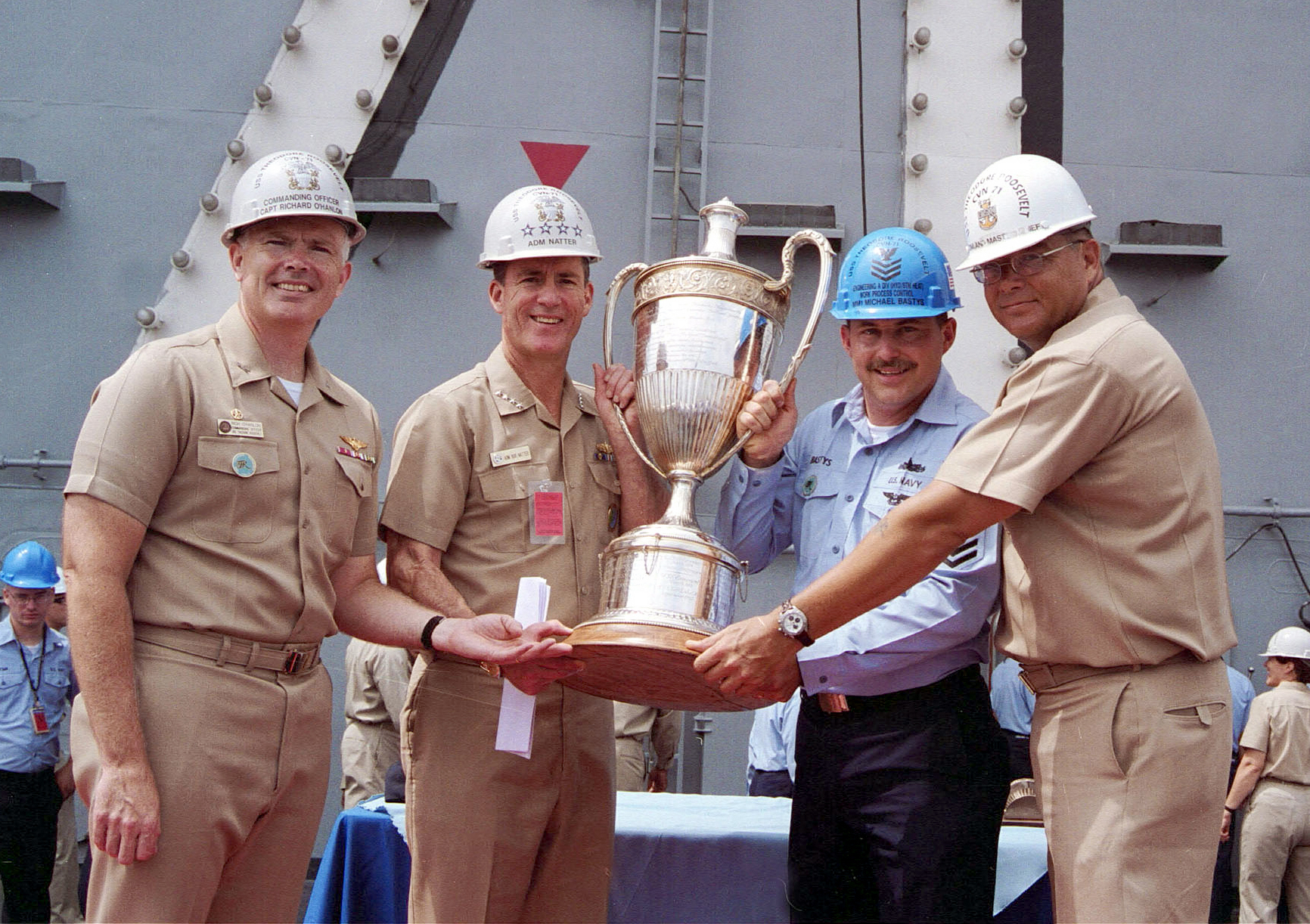
Battenberg Cup being presented aboard the USS Theodore Roosevelt

The Battenberg Cup is an award given annually as a symbol of operational excellence to the best ship or submarine in the United States Navy Atlantic Fleet. The cup was originally awarded as a trophy to the winner of cutter or longboat rowing competitions between crews of American and British naval ships. In more recent years it has been presented to the Battle Efficiency "E" winner selected as the best all-around ship of the Fleet based on crew achievements. These include performance in competition for Atlantic Fleet Sportsmanship Award, TYCOM Sailor of the Year Award, Golden Anchor Award (for retention), Captain Edward F. Ney Memorial Award (for food service), and command excellence awards. Other information, such as operating schedules, commitments and unusual factors contributing to the nomination may also be considered.

== History ==
In 1905, Prince Louis of Battenberg, commanding the five ships of the Royal Navy's 2nd Cruiser Squadron, visited the United States, making port visits in New York City, Annapolis and Washington, D.C. Shortly after his return to England, Battenberg sent the cup to Rear Admiral Robley Evans who at the time commanded the US North Atlantic Fleet. Battenberg requested the trophy become a challenge cup between enlisted men of the two navies. The challenge rules were set up for cutter racing, including a provision that British sailors could compete with their American counterparts "whenever a ship holding the cup would fall in with a British Man-O-War." Only once in 34 years of competition (in 1907 during the Jamestown Exposition in Norfolk, Virginia) and 52 challenges did the Americans lose the cup to the British.

The rowing competition was discontinued due to World War II and never resumed. The cup was present at the attack on Pearl Harbor on 7 December 1941 aboard USS West Virginia, the last ship to win the cup. It survived the sinking of the West Virginia during the attack and remained aboard as she was raised, refitted and returned to the war. The ship retained custody of the cup until her decommissioning in 1947 when the cup was displayed at several Navy commands. It was eventually placed in the Navy Memorial Museum in Washington, D.C. until the competition reemerged in 1978 with new criteria.

The side of the 3-foot-high (0.91 m), silver-plated cup is engraved, "To the enlisted men of the North Atlantic Fleet from their British cousins of the 2nd Cruiser Squadron. In grateful remembrance of the many kindnesses, tokens of good fellowship and wonderful entertainments that were given to them in cordial friendship by their comrades across the sea." It features the crossed ensigns of the US Navy and Royal Navy.

== Winners ==
- 2024 - USS Laboon (DDG-58)
- 2023 - USS Gerald R. Ford
- 2022 - USS The Sullivans (DDG-68)
- 2021 - USS Mitscher (DDG-57)
- 2020 - USS Harry S. Truman (CVN-75)
- 2019 – USS Minnesota (SSN-783)
- 2018 – USS Monterey (CG-61)
- 2017 – USS Hartford (SSN-768)
- 2016 – USS Mason (DDG-87)
- 2015 – USS George Washington (CVN-73)
- 2014 – USS Alaska (SSBN-732)
- 2013 – USS Gettysburg (CG-64)
- 2012 – USS Dwight D. Eisenhower (CVN-69)
- 2011 – USS George H. W. Bush (CVN-77)
- 2010 – USS Boise (SSN-764)
- 2009 – USS Carney (DDG-64)
- 2008 – USS Kearsarge (LHD-3)
- 2007 – USS Enterprise (CVN-65)
- 2006 – USS Dwight D. Eisenhower (CVN-69)
- 2005 – USS Memphis (SSN-691)
- 2004 – USS Anzio (CG-68)
- 2003 – USS Harry S. Truman (CVN-75)
- 2002 – USS George Washington (CVN-73)
- 2001 – USS Theodore Roosevelt (CVN-71)
- 2000 – USS George Washington (CVN-73)
- 1999 – USS Miami (SSN-755)
- 1998 – USS Barry (DDG-52)
- 1997 – USS George Washington (CVN-73)
- 1996 – USS Barry (DDG-52)
- 1995 – USS America (CV-66)
- 1994 – USS Barry (DDG-52)
- 1993 – USS Theodore Roosevelt (CVN-71)
- 1992 – USS San Jacinto (CG-56)
- 1991 – USS Theodore Roosevelt (CVN-71)
- 1988 – USS Nicholas (FFG-47)
- 1986 – USS Underwood (FFG-36)
- 1985 – USS Iowa (BB-61)
- 1983 – USS John F. Kennedy (CV-67)
- 1982 – USS Mississippi (CGN-40)
- 1980 – USS Briscoe (DD-977)
- 1979 – USS Richard L. Page (FFG-5)
- 1978 – USS Albany (CG-10)
- 1978 – USS Holland (AS-32)
- 1941–1977 – NO AWARD

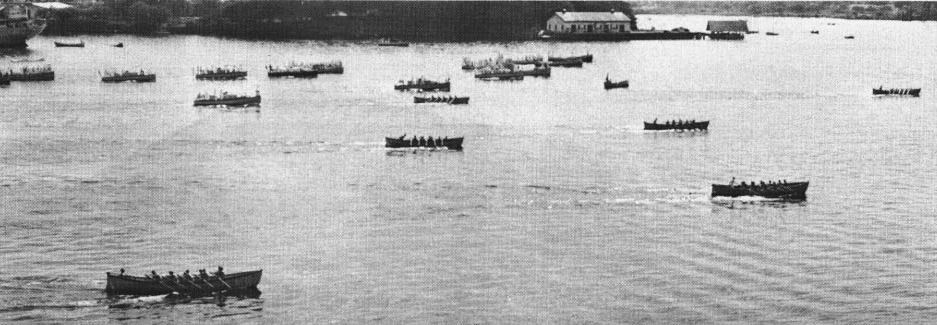
The 1939 Battenberg Cup whaleboat race at Pearl Harbor.

- 1940 – USS West Virginia (BB-48)
- 1939 – USS Enterprise (CV-6)
- 1937 – USS Tennessee (BB-43)
- 1936 – USS Concord (CL-10)
- 1935 – USS Concord (CL-10)
- 1934 – USS Arkansas (BB-33)

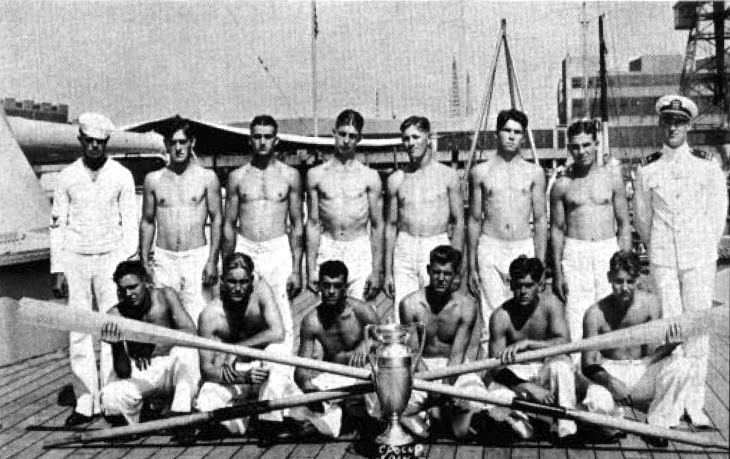
Arizona (BB-39) whaleboat crew with the Battenberg Cup, 1931.

- 1931 – USS Arizona (BB-39)
- 1929 – USS Arkansas (BB-33)
- 1928 October – USS Utah (BB-31)
- 1928 March – USS Arkansas (BB-33)
- 1927 October – USS Arkansas (BB-33)
- 1920 – USS Nevada (BB-36)
- 1919 – USS Arizona (BB-39)
- 1918 – USS Arizona (BB-39)
- 1909 – USS Minnesota (BB-22)
- 1908 - USS Louisiana (BB-19)
- 1907 – HMS Argyll (1904)
- 1906 – USS Illinois (BB-7)

== Bibliography ==
- Stillwell, Paul. Battleship Arizona; An Illustrated History. Annapolis, Maryland: Naval Institute Press, 1991. ISBN 0-87021-023-8. OCLC 23654474.
