= USS Barry (DDG-52) =

Arleigh Burke-class destroyer

- USS Barry (DDG-52)

History

United States
- Name: Barry
- Namesake: Commodore John Barry
- Ordered: 26 May 1987
- Builder: Ingalls Shipbuilding
- Laid down: 26 February 1990
- Launched: 10 May 1991
- Christened: 8 June 1991
- Commissioned: 12 December 1992
- Home port: Everett
- Identification: MMSI number: 898765527; Callsign: NNJB; Hull number: DDG-52
- Motto: Strength and Diversity
- Honors and awards: See Awards
- Status: in active service
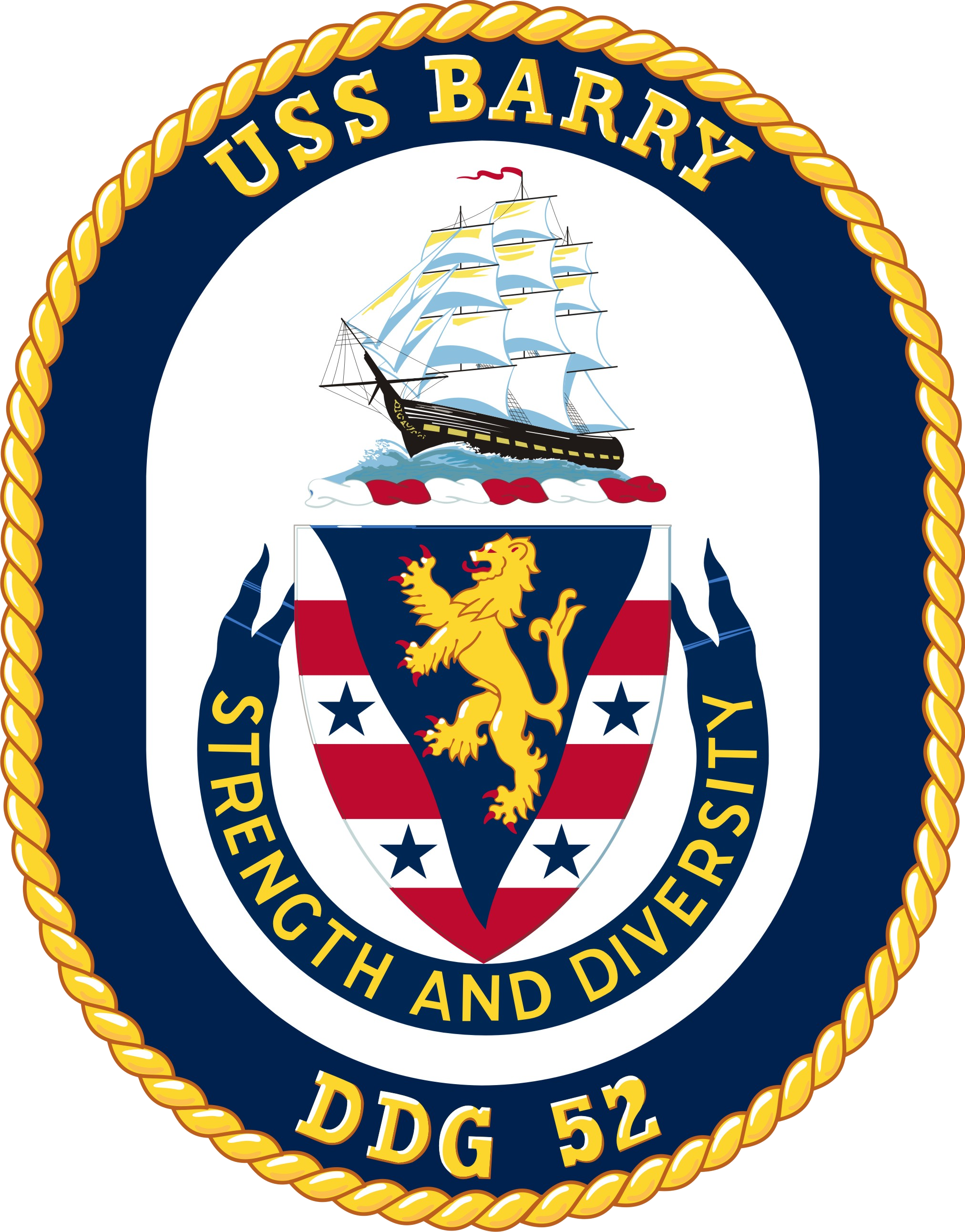
- Badge

General characteristics
- Class & type: Arleigh Burke-class destroyer
- Displacement: Light: approx. 6,800 long tons (6,900 t); Full: approx. 8,900 long tons (9,000 t)
- Length: 505 ft (154 m)
- Beam: 59 ft (18 m)
- Draft: 31 ft (9.4 m)
- Installed power: 4 × General Electric LM2500-30 gas turbines; 100,000 shp (75,000 kW)
- Propulsion: 2 × shafts
- Speed: In excess of 30 kn (56 km/h; 35 mph)
- Range: 4,400 nmi (8,100 km; 5,100 mi) at 20 kn (37 km/h; 23 mph)
- Complement: 33 commissioned officers; 38 chief petty officers; 210 enlisted personnel
- Sensors & processing systems: AN/SPY-1D PESA 3D radar (Flight I, II, IIA); AN/SPY-6(V)1 AESA 3D radar (Flight III); AN/SPS-67(V)3 or (V)5 surface search radar (DDG-51 – DDG-118); AN/SPQ-9B surface search radar (DDG-119 onward); AN/SPS-73(V)12 surface search/navigation radar (DDG-51 – DDG-86); BridgeMaster E surface search/navigation radar (DDG-87 onward); 3 × AN/SPG-62 fire-control radar; Mk 46 optical sight system (Flight I, II, IIA); Mk 20 electro-optical sight system (Flight III); AN/SQQ-89 ASW combat system: AN/SQS-53C sonar array; AN/SQR-19 tactical towed array sonar (Flight I, II, IIA); TB-37U multi-function towed array sonar (DDG-113 onward); AN/SQQ-28 LAMPS III shipboard system
- Electronic warfare & decoys: AN/SLQ-32 electronic warfare suite; AN/SLQ-25 Nixie torpedo countermeasures; Mk 36 Mod 12 decoy launching systems; Mk 53 Nulka decoy launching systems; Mk 59 decoy launching systems
- Armament: Guns: 1 × 5-inch (127 mm)/54 mk 45 mod 1/2 (lightweight gun); 2 × 20 mm (0.8 in) Phalanx CIWS; 2 × 25 mm (0.98 in) Mk 38 machine gun system; 4 × 0.50 inches (12.7 mm) caliber guns; Missiles: 2 × Mk 141 Harpoon anti-ship missile launcher; 1 × 29-cell, 1 × 61-cell (90 total cells) Mk 41 vertical launching system (VLS): RIM-66M surface-to-air missile; RIM-156 surface-to-air missile; RIM-161 anti-ballistic missile; BGM-109 Tomahawk cruise missile; RUM-139 vertical launch ASROC; Torpedoes: 2 × Mark 32 triple torpedo tubes: Mark 46 lightweight torpedo; Mark 50 lightweight torpedo; Mark 54 lightweight torpedo
- Aircraft carried: 1 × Sikorsky MH-60R

USS Barry (DDG-52) is an Arleigh Burke-class (Flight I) Aegis guided missile destroyer, commissioned in 1992. Barry is the fourth United States Navy ship named after the "Father of the American Navy", Commodore John Barry (1745–1803). Her homeport is Naval Station Everett, Washington. Several improvements over Arleigh Burke exist on this ship and all following Arleigh Burke-class destroyers, such as the ability to refuel a helicopter.

Barry's keel was laid down on 26 February 1990, at the Ingalls Shipbuilding shipyard in Pascagoula, Mississippi. She was launched on 10 May 1991, and christened on 8 June 1991, by her sponsor Rose Cochran, wife of United States Senator Thad Cochran. Barry was commissioned into the U.S. Atlantic Fleet on 12 December 1992, and was placed under the command of Commander Gary Roughead. The commissioning ceremony took place at Naval Station Pascagoula in Pascagoula, Mississippi.

Following ship's commissioning, Barry underwent Post Delivery Test and Trials (PDT&T). During this period, Barry tested every major system on board. An Operational Propulsion Plant Examination (OPPE) was conducted, with Barry receiving an overall grade of Excellent. Combat Systems Ship Qualifications Trials (CSSQT) were also conducted that included 13 missile firings.

Barry has received many awards, including the Battenberg Cup for the years 1994, 1996, and 1998. She has also been awarded the Battle E award eight times, and received the Golden Anchor and Silver Anchor Awards for retention. More recently, in 2004 Barry received the Arleigh Burke Fleet Trophy for being the most improved ship in the Atlantic Fleet.

== History ==
=== 1993 ===
In April 1993, Barry underwent Final Contract Trials (FCT) before returning to Ingalls Shipbuilding in May 1993, for a three-month Post Shakedown Availability (PSA). This availability included a 4-week dry-docking that included installation of the Navy's new generation Advanced Technology Design propellers, designed to reduce cavitation at high speed and improve fuel economy. Other improvements included installation of an Electro-Optical Sighting System (EOSS), application of Passive Countermeasure System (PCMS) material, tank stiffening and installation of a gray water collection system. On 21 October 1993, Captain Gary Roughead, Barry's first commanding officer, was relieved by Commander James G. Stavridis. Barry was under command of (tactical) Destroyer Squadron 26 in 1993, 1994 and 1995, while administratively part of Destroyer Squadron 2. In November 1993, Barry received orders to proceed to Haiti, to take part in Operation Support Democracy. Barry's duties included enforcing the embargo of arms and petroleum products to the island nation.

=== 1994 ===
In January 1994, Barry completed her first combined Combat Systems Assessment (CSA)/Cruise Missile Tactical Qualification (CMTQ), achieving one of the Atlantic Fleet's highest score to date. In March, Barry participated in exercise MAYFLYEX 94 where her Aegis combat system successfully engaged and destroyed several Exocet anti-ship cruise missiles. In April, Barry wrapped up her preparations for her first overseas combat deployment by participating in FLEETEX 2–94 with other units of the George Washington Battle Group. A highlight of this exercise was a covert SEAL team extraction in shallow water only a few miles off the Carolina coast, successfully validating the stealth characteristics of the DDG-51 class.

On 20 May 1994, Barry departed Norfolk, Virginia, on her first Mediterranean deployment. During Barry's maiden deployment, she served alongside the aircraft carrier George Washington as the backdrop for the 50th anniversary of D-Day. Barry also sailed the Mediterranean and Adriatic Seas as "Red Crown" in support of the No-Fly Zone over Bosnia-Herzegovina.

On 7 October 1994, Barry received orders to proceed to the Persian Gulf' in response to Iraq's massing of troops on the Kuwaiti border. In what would become known as Operation Vigilant Warrior, Barry's participation included escort of both George Washington, and an amphibious assault group, to anchorage off Kuwait City. Barry also served as alternate Persian Gulf Anti-Air Warfare Coordinator (AAWC), and principal Tomahawk strike platform during the crisis. Barry received a Meritorious Unit Commendation, the Southwest Asia Service Medal, the Armed Forces Service Medal, and the NATO Medal for her actions during the deployment and returned home to Norfolk, Virginia on 17 November 1994.

=== 1995 ===
In January 1995, Barry began a three-month SRA at Moon Engineering located in Portsmouth, Virginia. This SRA included the Women at Sea (WAS) modification.

=== 2003 ===
In March 2003, she was assigned to Destroyer Squadron 26.

=== 2004 ===
In 2004, Barry participated at the annual Fleet Week in New York City.

=== 2006 ===
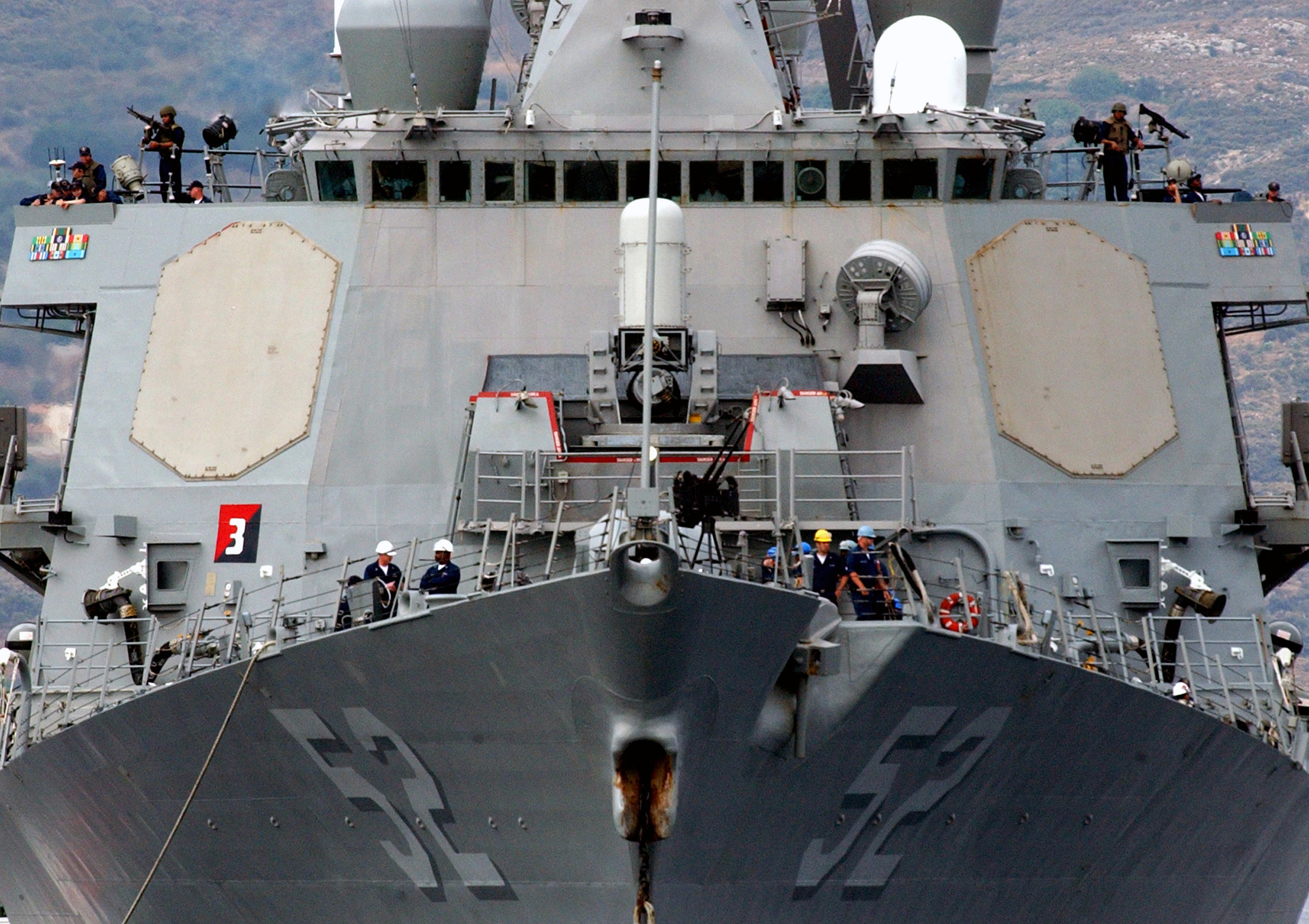
Bow view of Barry as she arrives in Souda Bay, Greece, 2006

In 2006, Barry joined her sister ship, Gonzalez, in providing cover for Orient Queen, a cruise ship chartered by the United States to help evacuate American citizens during the 2006 Israeli-Lebanon conflict.

=== 2011 ===
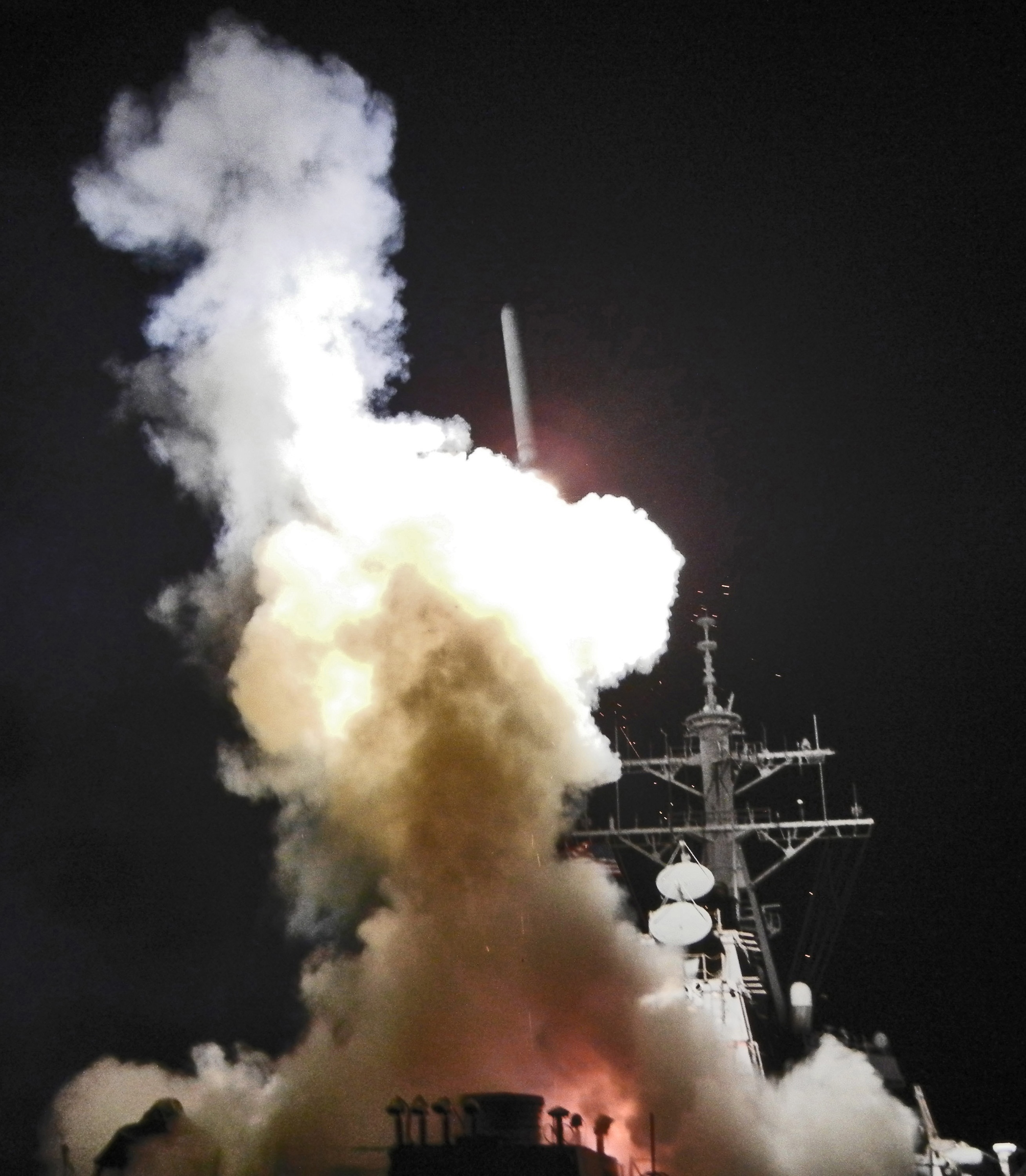
Barry firing a Tomahawk missile during Operation Odyssey Dawn on 19 March 2011

On 1 March 2011, Barry was dispatched to the Mediterranean Sea, in response to the 2011 Libyan civil war. On 19 March 2011, the Navy reported that Barry fired 55 Tomahawk cruise missiles to suppress the Libyan air defense system in support of United Nations Security Council Resolution 1973. The official codename for the U.S. part of the operation is Operation Odyssey Dawn. On 28 March, Barry assisted a U.S. Navy P-3C Orion, from Patrol Squadron Five, and an A-10 Thunderbolt aircraft attacking a group of three Libyan Coast Guard boats which were firing upon merchant vessels.

=== 2013 ===
In late August 2013, she was ordered, alongside her sister ships Gravely, Mahan and Ramage to patrol the eastern Mediterranean Sea in response to rising rumors of an imminent military intervention in the Syrian civil war.

=== 2016 ===
In early 2016, Barry conducted a hull swap with Lassen, in which the two crews switched ships. Lassen operated out of Yokosuka, from 2005 to 2016. Barry completed midlife modernization prior to making the switch and was outfitted with Aegis Baseline 9, the latest combat system, which is capable of defensive and offensive operations against aircraft, cruise missiles, ballistic missiles, surface ships, submarines and shore targets. Barry also received a fully integrated bridge, quality-of-life upgrades, and advanced galley during refit.

=== 2020 ===
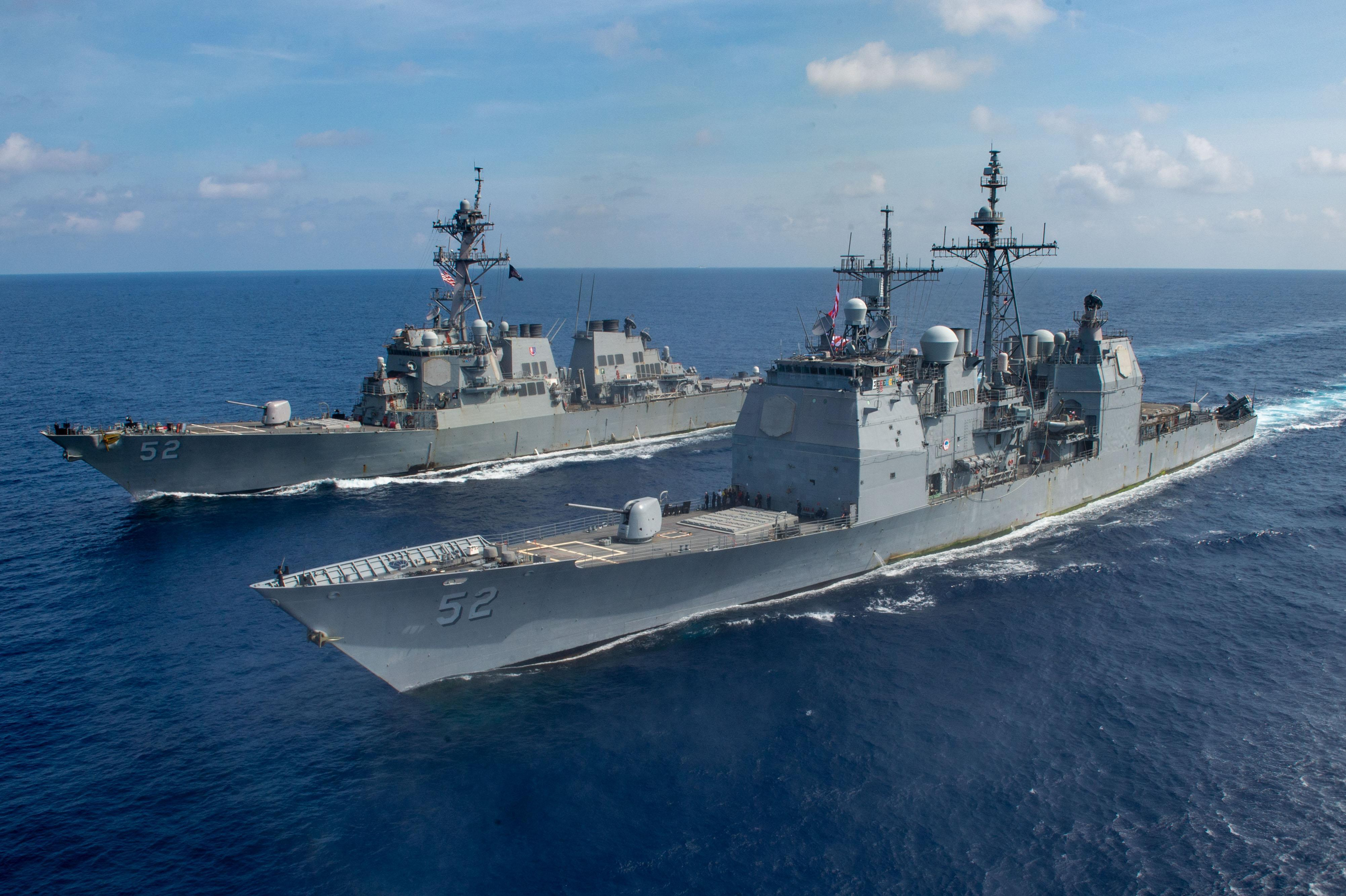
Barry underway in the South China Sea with Ticonderoga-class cruiser USS Bunker Hill, 18 April 2020

On 10 April and 24 April 2020, Barry transited the Taiwan Strait.

=== 2022 ===
In 2022, Barry was part of Carrier Strike Group 5 led by USS Ronald Reagan. Also deployed was sister ship USS Benfold and cruiser USS Chancellorsville.

=== 2023 ===
After forward deployment for six years, Barry moved to Naval Station Everett, where the ship underwent routine maintenance. In August 2023 Barry offered public tours as part of Seattle Fleet Week.

== Awards ==
- Navy Unit Commendation - (Jan 1994-Dec 1997, Oct 1997-Apr 1998, 5-31 Mar 2011)
- Navy Meritorious Unit Commendation - (2-8 Jun 1994, Jun-Nov 1994, Apr-Sep 2002, Jan 2011-Nov 2012, Feb-Nov 2020)
- Navy E Ribbon - (1994, 1996, 1997, 1998, 2011, 2013, 2020, 2021)
- Humanitarian Service Medal - (Jul-Aug 2006)
- Battenberg Cup - (1994, 1996, 1998)
- NATO Medal - (1994)
- Southwest Asia Service Medal - (1994)
- PACFLT Anti-Submarine Warfare (ASW) Bloodhound Award - 2020
- Spokane Trophy - (2020)
- Arleigh Burke Fleet Trophy - (2004)
