= Richard P. Snyder =

U.S. Navy general

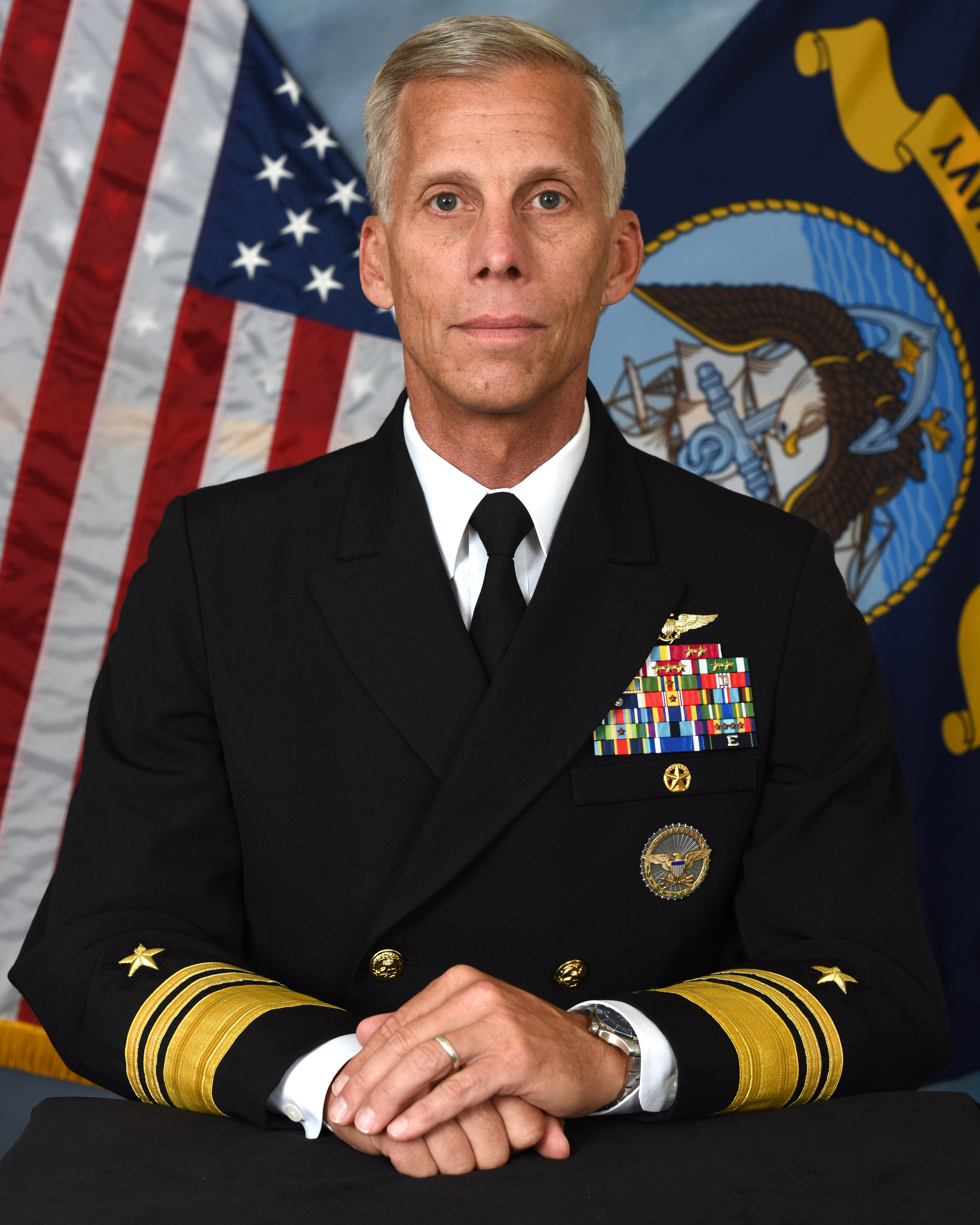
- Born: 1960 (age 65–66)
- Military career
- Allegiance: United States
- Branch: United States Navy
- Service years: 1983–2021
- Rank: Vice admiral
- Commands: Expeditionary Strike Group 2 USS Bataan (LHD-5); HSL-40; HSL-46
- Awards: Defense Superior Service Medal (3); Legion of Merit (3)

Richard Paul Snyder (born 1960) is a retired United States Navy vice admiral who last served as the 41st Naval Inspector General. Previously, he was the director of strategy, plans, and policy of the United States Northern Command. Snyder earned a B.S. degree in management from Tulane University in 1983. He was designated a naval aviator in November 1984. Snyder later received an M.S. degree in operations research from the Naval Postgraduate School.

Military offices
Preceded by Ann C. Phillips	Director for Joint Strategic Planning of the Joint Staff; 2011–2012	Succeeded by Ronald A. Boxall
Preceded by ???	Director of Strategy, Plans, and Policy of the United States Northern Command; 201?–2018	Succeeded by John V. Fuller
Preceded by Herman A. Shelanski	Naval Inspector General; 2018–2021	Succeeded by John V. Fuller
