= USS Nitze =

United States Navy destroyer

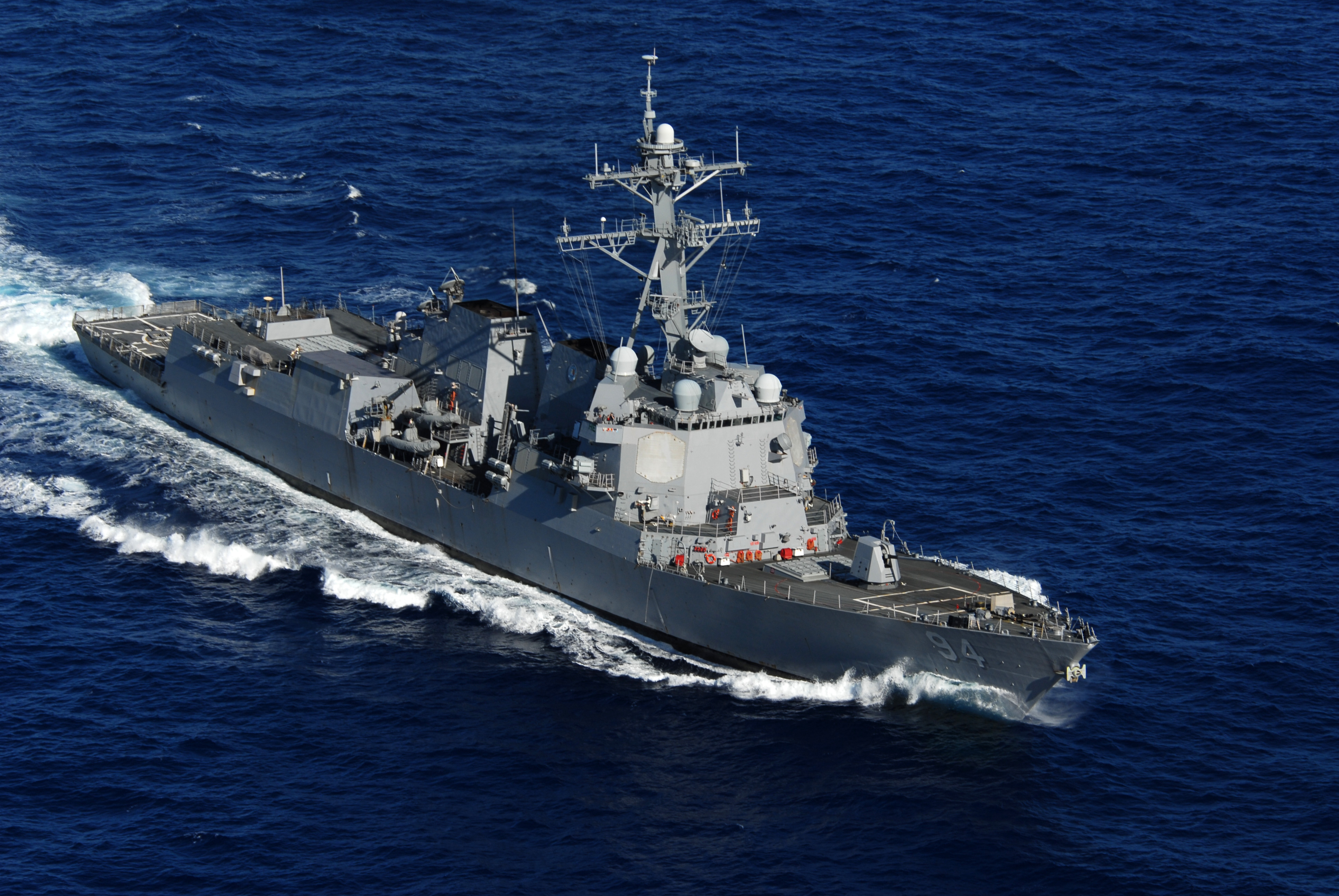
- USS Nitze on 23 April 2011

History

United States
- Name: Nitze
- Namesake: Paul Nitze
- Ordered: 6 March 1998
- Builder: Bath Iron Works
- Laid down: 20 September 2002
- Launched: 3 April 2004
- Commissioned: 5 March 2005
- Home port: Norfolk
- Identification: MMSI number: 369974000; Callsign: NCWR; Hull number: DDG-94
- Motto: Vision, Courage, Determination
- Honours and awards: See Awards
- Status: in active service
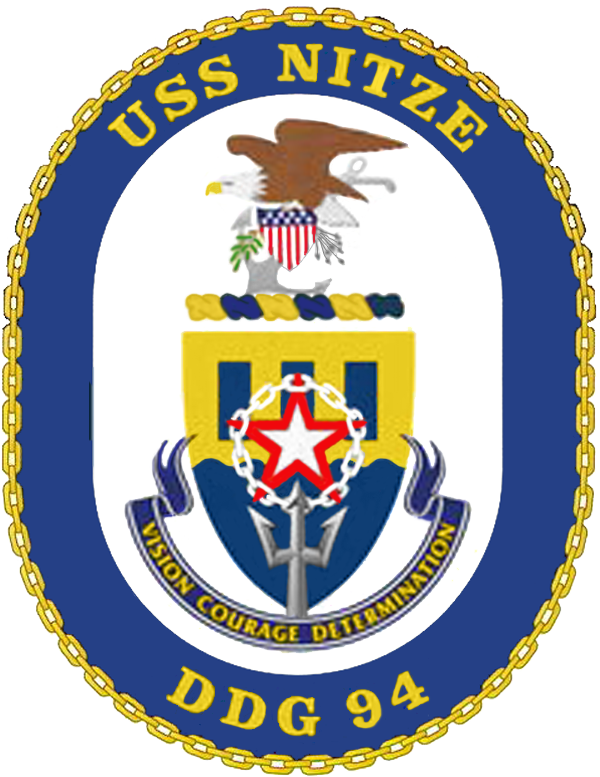
- Badge

General characteristics
- Class & type: Arleigh Burke-class guided missile destroyer
- Displacement: 6,600 tons light, 9,200 tons full, 2,600 tons dead
- Length: 509 feet 6 inches (155.30 m) length overall; 471 feet (144 m) waterline length
- Beam: 66 feet (20 m) extreme; 59 feet (18 m) at waterline
- Draft: 31 feet (9.4 m) maximum; 22 feet (6.7 m) limit
- Propulsion: Four General Electric LM2500-30 gas turbines, two shafts, 100,000 shp (75 MW)
- Speed: Over 30 knots (56 km/h; 35 mph)
- Complement: 30 officers, 350 sailors
- Armament: Guns: 1 × 5-inch (127 mm)/62 Mk 45 Mod 4 (lightweight gun); 1 × 20 mm (0.8 in) Phalanx CIWS; 2 × 25 mm (0.98 in) Mk 38 machine gun system; 4 × 0.50 in (12.7 mm) caliber guns; Missiles: 1 × 32-cell, 1 × 64-cell (96 total cells) Mk 41 vertical launching system (VLS): RIM-66M surface-to-air missile; RIM-156 surface-to-air missile; RIM-174A Standard ERAM; RIM-161 anti-ballistic missile; RIM-162 ESSM (quad-packed); BGM-109 Tomahawk cruise missile; RUM-139 vertical launch ASROC; Torpedoes: 2 × Mark 32 triple torpedo tubes: Mark 46 lightweight torpedo; Mark 50 lightweight torpedo; Mark 54 lightweight torpedo
- Aircraft carried: 2 × MH-60R Seahawk helicopters

USS Nitze (DDG-94) is an Arleigh Burke-class (Flight IIA) Aegis guided missile destroyer in the United States Navy. She is named for Paul Nitze, who served as Secretary of the Navy under President Lyndon B. Johnson and as chief arms control adviser in the administration of President Ronald Reagan.

== Service history ==
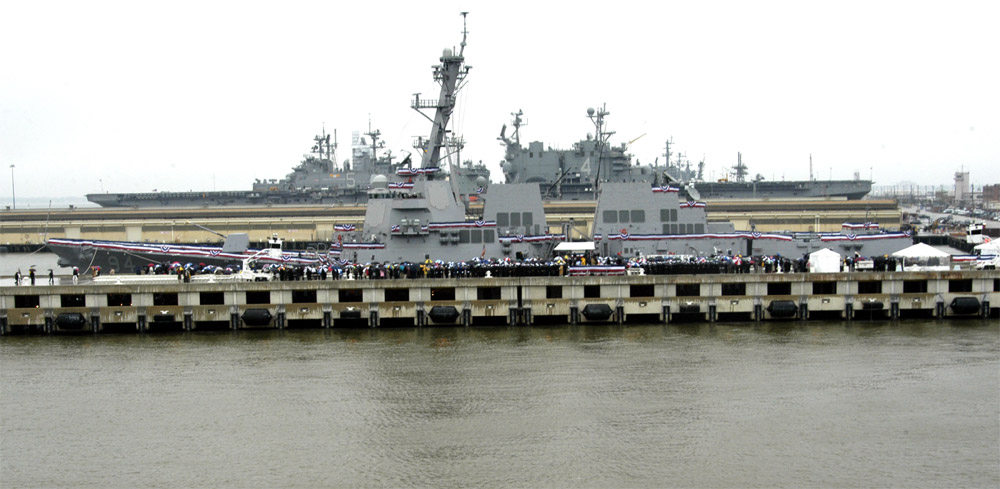
Nitze during her commissioning ceremony. USS Nassau and USS Bataan can be seen in the background, March 2005.

The contract to build her was awarded to Bath Iron Works Corporation in Bath, Maine, on 6 March 1998, and her keel was laid down on 20 September 2002. She was launched on 3 April 2004, sponsored by Elisabeth Porter, Nitze's wife. Nitze, who was 97 years old at the time, was present at the christening, thus adding the destroyer to the list of U.S. military vessels named after living Americans. Nitze was commissioned on 5 March 2005 in Norfolk, Virginia. Nitze, homeported in Norfolk, Virginia, went on her maiden deployment in January 2007 as part of the USS Bataan Expeditionary Strike Group, returning home on 3 July 2007.

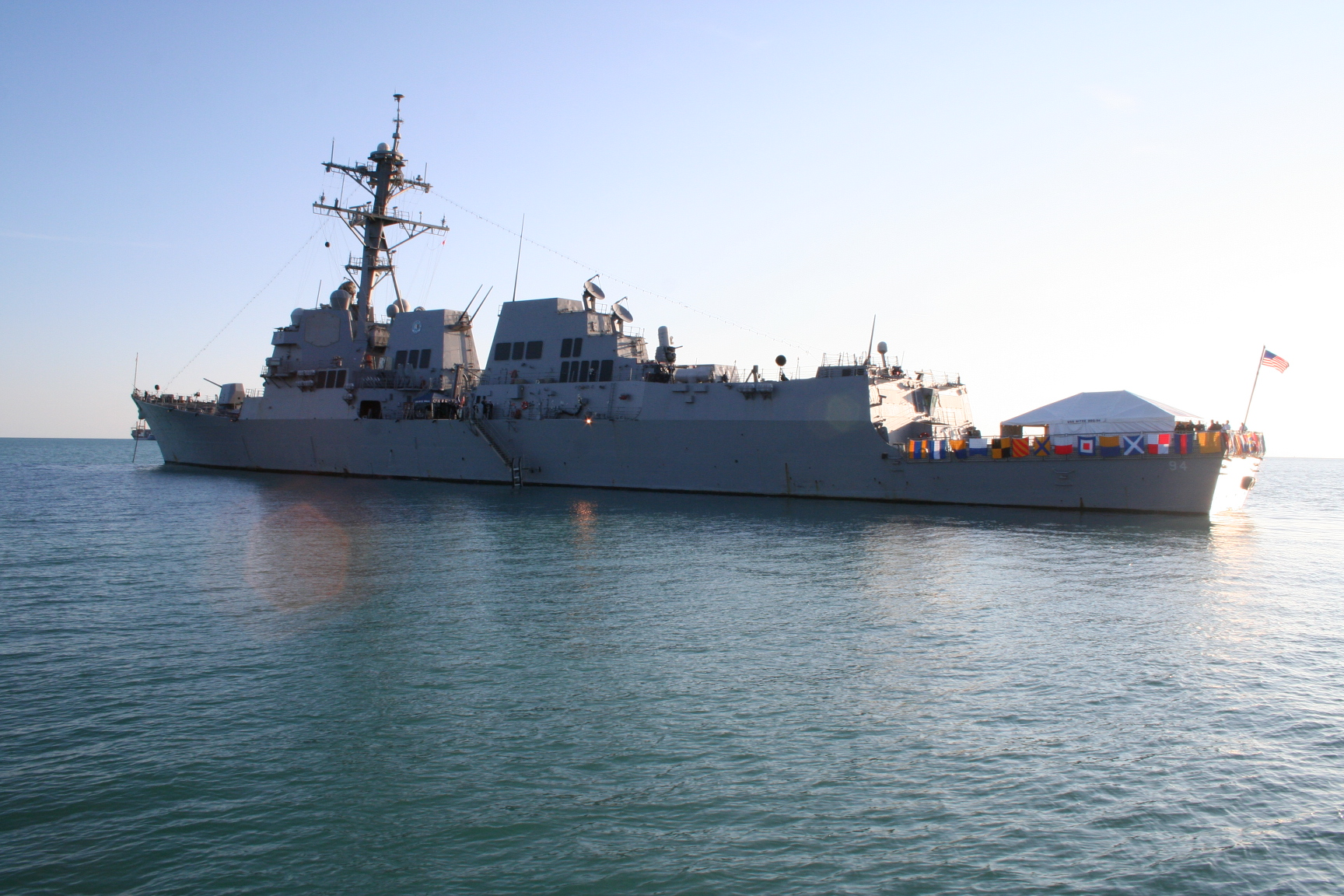
USS Nitze seen from her port side, with signal flags displayed on the railing of her helideck, March 2009

On 12 September 2008, Nitze departed Norfolk for a seven-month deployment with Carrier Strike Group Two, led by USS Theodore Roosevelt, returning on 18 April 2009. In October 2009, Nitze was open to the public for tours in downtown Norfolk as part of the Navy Fleet Week celebration. She was moored at the Nauticus Museum and Half Moone Cruise terminal. During 1–5 July 2011, Nitze was docked in Eastport, Maine, for 4th of July celebrations.

From 12 March to 4 November 2012, Nitze completed her third deployment to the Fifth Fleet Area of Responsibility with the USS Enterprise Battlegroup (CCSG 12). Nitze was deployed a fourth time, from 29 November 2013, to 15 July 2014, spending most of their time off the Horn of Africa conducting maritime security operations.

On 24 August 2016, Nitze was conducting a routine transit near the Strait of Hormuz, accompanied by USS Mason, when the ship was approached by four small patrol craft of the Iranian Revolutionary Guard Corps. The US Navy called the maneuver a "high speed intercept". After multiple attempts to contact the vessels, and then to warn them away, Nitze changed course to avoid closer contact. Two of the Iranian craft closed to 300 yards (270 m) before finally slowing and moving off.

On 13 October 2016, following two missile attacks on Mason from Houthi-held territory in war-torn Yemen, Nitze attacked three radar sites which had been involved in the earlier attacks with Tomahawk cruise missiles; the Pentagon assessed that all three sites were destroyed.

Nitze was underway for First East Coast Carrier Strike Group SWATT November 2018.

In July 2022, Nitze deployed as part of Destroyer Squadron 26 along with USS Delbert D. Black, USS Truxtun, and USS Farragut embarked with Carrier Strike Group 10 led by USS George H.W. Bush. As part of the deployment, the ship sailed in the Sea of Marmara in February 2023 making it the first U.S. warship to enter the Sea of Marmara since the beginning of the 2022 Russian invasion of Ukraine. She returned to Norfolk on 5 April 2023 completing a nine-month long deployment.

== Awards ==
- Combat Action Ribbon - (9-15 Oct 2016)
- Navy Unit Commendation - (Sep 2008-Apr 2009)
- Navy Meritorious Unit Commendation - (Jan 2011-Nov 2012)
- Navy E Ribbon - (2007, 2009, 2012, 2014, 2017, 2020, 2021, 2022)
- Secretary of the Navy (SECNAV) Energy Conservation Award (combatant medium/large category) - (2016)
