= USS Mahan (DDG-72) =

American guided missile destroyer

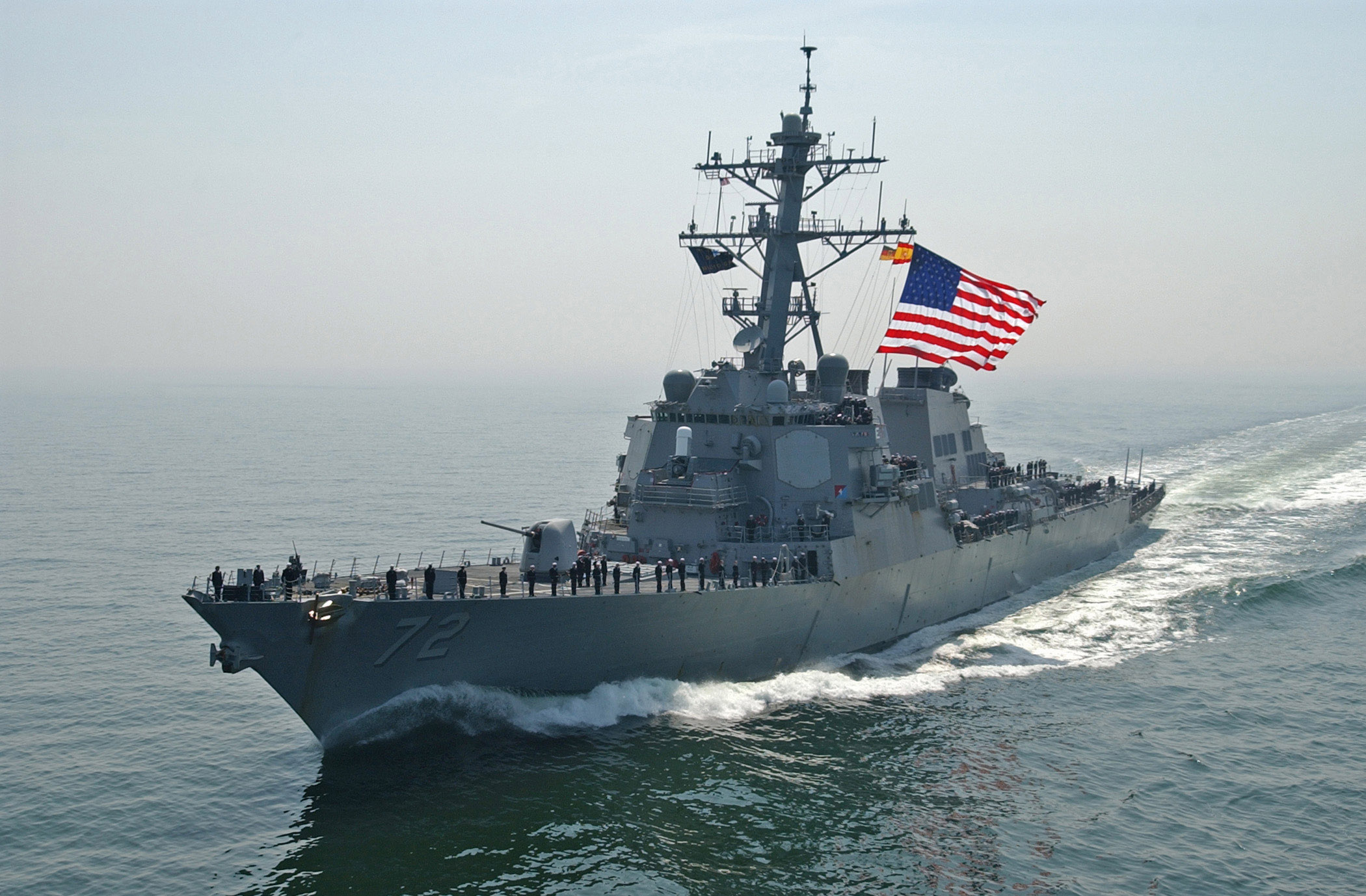
- USS Mahan (DDG-72) underway on 28 May 2007

History

United States
- Name: Mahan
- Namesake: Alfred Thayer Mahan
- Ordered: 8 April 1992
- Builder: Bath Iron Works
- Laid down: 17 August 1995
- Launched: 29 June 1996
- Acquired: 22 August 1997
- Commissioned: 14 February 1998
- Home port: Norfolk
- Identification: MMSI number: 368972000; Callsign: NBTF; Hull number: DDG-72
- Motto: Built to Fight
- Honours and awards: See Awards
- Status: in active service
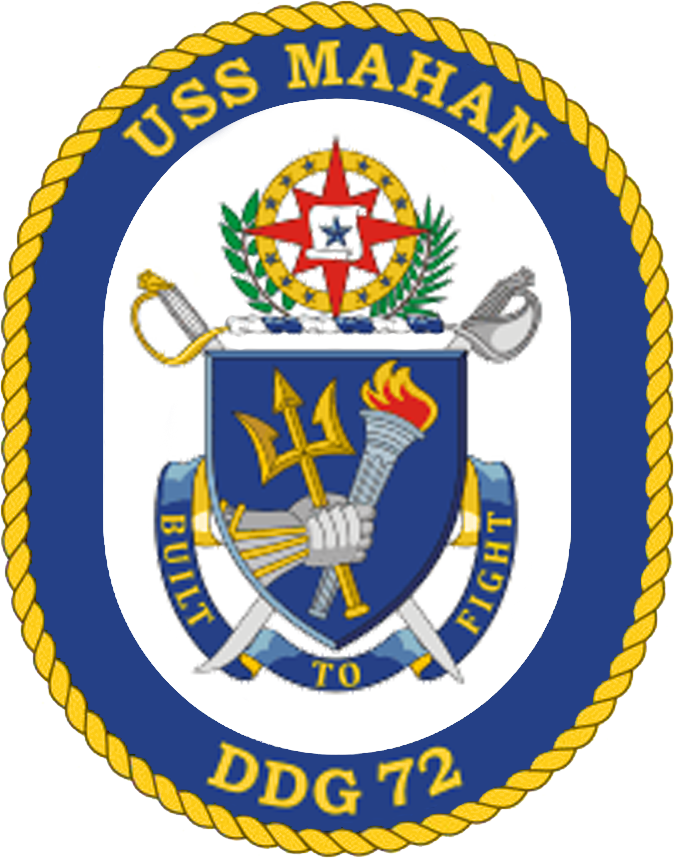
- Badge

General characteristics
- Class & type: Arleigh Burke-class destroyer
- Displacement: 8,637 long tons (8,776 t) (Full load)
- Length: 505 ft (154 m)
- Beam: 59 ft (18 m)
- Draft: 31 ft (9.4 m)
- Installed power: 4 × General Electric LM2500-30 gas turbines; 100,000 shp (75,000 kW)
- Propulsion: 2 × shafts
- Speed: In excess of 30 kn (56 km/h; 35 mph)
- Range: 4,400 nmi (8,100 km; 5,100 mi) at 20 kn (37 km/h; 23 mph)
- Complement: 33 commissioned officers; 38 chief petty officers; 210 enlisted personnel
- Sensors & processing systems: AN/SPY-1D PESA 3D radar (Flight I, II, IIA); AN/SPY-6(V)1 AESA 3D radar (Flight III); AN/SPS-67(V)3 or (V)5 surface search radar (DDG-51 – DDG-118); AN/SPQ-9B surface search radar (DDG-119 onward); AN/SPS-73(V)12 surface search/navigation radar (DDG-51 – DDG-86); BridgeMaster E surface search/navigation radar (DDG-87 onward); 3 × AN/SPG-62 fire-control radar; Mk 46 optical sight system (Flight I, II, IIA); Mk 20 electro-optical sight system (Flight III); AN/SQQ-89 ASW combat system: AN/SQS-53C sonar array; AN/SQR-19 tactical towed array sonar (Flight I, II, IIA); TB-37U multi-function towed array sonar (DDG-113 onward); AN/SQQ-28 LAMPS III shipboard system
- Electronic warfare & decoys: AN/SLQ-32 electronic warfare suite; AN/SLQ-25 Nixie torpedo countermeasures; Mk 36 Mod 12 decoy launching systems; Mk 53 Nulka decoy launching systems; Mk 59 decoy launching systems
- Armament: Guns: 1 × 5-inch (127 mm)/54 mk 45 mod 1/2 (lightweight gun); 2 × 20 mm (0.8 in) Phalanx CIWS; 2 × 25 mm (0.98 in) Mk 38 machine gun system; 4 × 0.50 inches (12.7 mm) caliber guns; Missiles: 2 × Mk 141 Harpoon anti-ship missile launcher; 1 × 29-cell, 1 × 61-cell (90 total cells) Mk 41 vertical launching system (VLS): RIM-66M surface-to-air missile; RIM-156 surface-to-air missile; RIM-161 anti-ballistic missile; BGM-109 Tomahawk cruise missile; RUM-139 vertical launch ASROC; Torpedoes: 2 × Mark 32 triple torpedo tubes: Mark 46 lightweight torpedo; Mark 50 lightweight torpedo; Mark 54 lightweight torpedo
- Aircraft carried: 1 × Sikorsky MH-60R

USS Mahan (DDG-72) is an Arleigh Burke-class (Flight II) Aegis guided missile destroyer currently in service with the United States Navy and is the first of the Flight II variant. This ship is the 22nd destroyer of her class. USS Mahan was the 12th ship of this class to be built at Bath Iron Works in Bath, Maine, and construction began on 17 August 1995. She was launched and christened on 29 June 1996. On 14 February 1998 she was commissioned in Tampa, Florida. Mahan is homeported in Norfolk, Virginia, and as of 2012 was attached to Destroyer Squadron 2. By 2016, the ship was part of Destroyer Squadron 22.

== Namesake ==
She is named for seapower naval theorist Admiral Alfred Thayer Mahan USN (1840–1914) and is the fourth Navy ship to bear the name. Mahan served with the Union's blockading squadrons during the American Civil War, and served as President of the Naval War College for two terms. Furthermore, he was a renowned U.S. Naval theoretician and is best known as the author of the book "The Influence of Sea Power upon History", which, with his other scholarly works, continues to influence strategic and geopolitical thinking throughout the world.

== Service history ==
The keel of Mahan was laid on 17 August 1995. Her mast was stepped on 6 February 1996, and she was launched and christened later that year on 29 June. The ship's sponsor is Mrs. Jennie Lou Arthur, wife of Admiral Stan Arthur. Her Aegis Combat System was lit off on 19 December.

1997 was a busy year for Mahan. Alpha/Bravo trials occurred on 21 July, Charlie trials on 5 August, and Delta trials on 12 August. The ship was officially transferred to the Navy on 22 August, and her Crew moved aboard on 17 October.

The ship’s first underway was 16–17 January 1998 from Bath, Maine, to Portland, Maine, for a three-day port visit. The weather was particularly heavy, and many of the crew members who had not put to sea before felt the effects of seasickness. Underway from Portland on 21 January, the ship pulled into her new homeport of Norfolk, Virginia, on 24 January. Mahan stayed in Norfolk until departing for her commissioning ceremony.

Mahan was commissioned at 1100 on 14 February 1998 at Tampa, Florida by the Commander, Naval Surface Force Atlantic, Vice Admiral Henry C. Griffin, III, USN with Commander Michael L. James, USN, commanding. Distinguished guests included Mr. Allen Cameron, President of Bath Iron Works, the Hon. Charles T. Canady, Congressman from Florida’s 12th District, and the Hon. George Nethercutt, Congressman from Washington’s 5th District. Mahan stayed in Tampa until 17 February, returning to Norfolk on 21 February. Mahan briefly left at the end of the month to conduct Combat Direction Finding System testing at sea.

The next few months saw events including Command Assessment of Readiness and Training (CART), ammunition onload at Yorktown Naval Weapons Station, Tailored Ship’s Training Availability (TSTA), Industrial Hygiene Survey, Combat Systems Ship’s Qualification Trial (CSSQT), evaluation at the Atlantic Undersea Test and Evaluation Center (AUTEC), MISSILEX, Naval Surface Fire Support (NSFS) qualification, VANDALEX, Final Conduct Trial, a post-Shipyard Availability Conference, and a recruiting video shoot, all before the end of July. In August, Mahan hosted the change of command ceremony for Commander Destroyer Squadron 26.

Mahan was placed in drydock in Portland, Maine on 1 September as part of the post-Shipyard Availability (PSA). Mahan departed Portland on 16 November, and during the transit back to Norfolk, conducted her first underway replenishment, with USNS Big Horn. The ship was underway twice for Helicopter Deck Landing Qualifications (DLQs) before the end of the year.

On 16 February 2007, Mahan was awarded the 2006 Battle "E" award.

In June 2009, Mahan participated as an opposition force unit during USS Harry S. Truman's Composite Training Unit Exercise (COMPTUEX).

In July 2009, Mahan participated in Operation Northern Trident, where she met two Royal Australian Navy ships, HMAS Sydney and HMAS Ballarat, in Halifax, Nova Scotia. The three ships conducted combined exercises at sea and a four-day port visit to New York City, New York. Mahan crew members worked with their Australian counterparts in cleaning the Soldiers, Sailors, Airmen, and Marines Center in midtown Manhattan. Receptions were held onboard all three ships while offering tours to the public. Crew members were able to pay their respects by conducting a wreath laying ceremony at the World Trade Center. Several sailors also reenlisted in Times Square and at the World Trade Center site.

USS Mahan began a Selected Restricted Availability (SRA) at the BAE Systems Ship Repair shipyard in Norfolk, Virginia on 6 January 2010. The extensive upgrades and installations received during this time focused on improving the ship's Command and Control capability. Mahan left the shipyard on 10 March, and completed a light-off assessment on 25 March, ending the SRA. The remainder of 2010 was dedicated to completing Basic Phase training, which had commenced prior to starting the SRA in 2009, conducting Integrated Phase training, and final repairs and installations to ensure Mahan was materially ready for an extended deployment. Mahan participated in the USS Kearsarge Amphibious Readiness Group's COMPTUEX in July, resulting in certification for maritime support operations. Mahan's executive officer was relieved on 17 September 2010 following an investigation and commodore's mast.

In August 2011, USS Mahan made a port visit to Rockland, Maine, in support of the 64th annual Maine Lobster Festival. The crew participated in a parade, tours, a cooking contest, community service projects, and a 10K race. Later that month, Mahan visited Newport, Rhode Island to be the Surface Warfare Officer's School (SWOS) Ship for the week of 15–19 August. Mahan was sortied along with 26 other ships in preparation for Hurricane Irene, returning 1 September 2011. Mahan began a Selected Restricted Availability (SRA) at the Marine Hydraulics International shipyard in Norfolk, Virginia, on 26 October 2011. During this availability, the ship received the Aegis Ballistic Missile Defense System upgrade. Commander Adam Aycock relieved Commander Kurt Mondlak as commanding officer on 4 November 2011.

USS Mahan's SRA ended on 29 February 2012, which was immediately followed by a light-off assessment and sea trials. The ship went through four Continuous Maintenance Availabilities (CMAVs) in April, June, September, and November. Following a command investigation, 13 Mahan sailors were awarded non-judicial punishment for illegal drug use during a captain's mast on 4 April 2012. On 10 April 2012, Mahan hosted a retired Chief Sonar Technician. In June and July, Mahan hosted midshipmen from the United States Naval Academy and Naval Reserve Officer Training Corps as part of Cortramid. In October, Mahan was evaluated by the Board of Inspection and Survey as part of a regularly scheduled inspection. Not only was Mahan the first ship to successfully demonstrate Ballistic Missile Defense during the inspection, the ship also achieved the highest score for a destroyer in several years. Later in October, Mahan was the host ship for the United States Naval Academy Homecoming Weekend in Annapolis, Maryland. The ship completed Independent Deployer Certification Exercise (IDCERTEX) in December in preparation for her upcoming deployment.

USS Mahan held a memorial ceremony on 6 December 2013, in honor of the 69th anniversary of the Battle of Ormoc Bay in which USS Mahan (DD-364) lost six crewmembers. On 10 January 2014, three USS Mahan (DDG-72) sailors traveled to Waynesburg, Pennsylvania, to present a flag to a veteran of USS Mahan (DD-364) who was unable to make the December ceremony.

USS Mahan visited New Orleans, Louisiana, during the 2014 Mardi Gras celebration.

A shooting occurred on the ship just before midnight on 24 March 2014, while the ship was pier-side at Naval Station Norfolk in Norfolk, Virginia. Master-At-Arms Second Class Mark Mayo who was on duty as the Chief of the Guard, dove in front of the ship's Petty Officer of the Watch to shield her from the gunman. For his actions, he was awarded the Navy and Marine Corps Medal. Mayo was killed and the civilian suspect was shot and killed by Naval Security Forces. The civilian armed himself by wrestling the weapon free from a Norfolk Naval Station Guard.

On 18 February 2026, it was reported to be joining the United States military buildup in the Middle East during the United States–Iran crisis as part of the USS Gerald R. Ford (CVN-78) carrier strike group.

Following her return from combat operations in Operation Epic Fury along with USS Gerald R. Ford to Naval Station Norfolk, U.S. Secretary of Defense Pete Hegseth, had awarded USS Gerald R. Ford and Mahan with the Presidential Unit Citation.

== Deployments ==
- MAR 2000-AUG 2000 Mediterranean Mahan departed Norfolk, Virginia, on 19 February 2000, on her maiden deployment to the Mediterranean as part of the USS Dwight D. Eisenhower Battle Group. She returned home on 18 August later that year.
- JUN 2002-DEC 2002 North Atlantic-Med-Indian Ocean Mahan's second deployment began when she departed Norfolk, Virginia, 20 June 2002. While deployed to the Mediterranean and North Atlantic Ocean, she made port visits in France, Scotland, Spain, Gibraltar, Slovenia, Crete, Malta, and the United Kingdom. She returned 20 December the same year.
- OCT 2006-NOV 2006 NEPTUNE WARRIOR
- JAN 2007-JUL 2007 SNMG-1
- SEP 2008-APR 2009 North Atlantic-Med-Indian Ocean
- NOV 2010-JUN 2011 North Atlantic-Med-Indian Ocean Mahan left Naval Station Norfolk on 7 November 2010, for a maritime security operation deployment as part of United States Naval Forces Europe to the Horn of Africa. The ship made port visits in Haifa, Israel, Djibouti, Djibouti, Souda Bay, Crete, and Istanbul, Turkey. The ship also stopped for fuel in Naval Station Rota in Spain. Mahan transited through the Suez Canal, the Bab-el-Mandeb Strait, the Dardanelles, and the Strait of Gibraltar. The ship returned to Naval Station Norfolk on 8 June 2011. During the 2011 maritime security operation deployment, USS Mahan was dispatched to the Mediterranean Sea to conduct operations in Libya. Insitu Inc. announced that its ScanEagle been assisting U.S. and NATO Forces in their mission to protect civilians and reduce the flow of arms to Libya. During a 72-hour counter-terrorism surge supporting Operation Unified Protector, the ScanEagle unmanned aerial vehicle was operated organically aboard Mahan to provide intelligence, surveillance and reconnaissance support. In strong winds, ScanEagle performed cooperatively with a host of US and NATO participating forces. On this deployment ScanEagles (the second aboard Mahan) the team achieved a 100 percent mission readiness rate, accruing 1,154 flight hours and 167 sorties.
- 28 Dec 2012-13 Sep 13 USS Mahan left Naval Station Norfolk on 28 December 2012, for a maritime security operation deployment to the United States Sixth Fleet Area of Responsibility. The ship made port visits in Augusta Bay, Sicily, Naples, Italy, Haifa, Israel, Limassol, Cyprus, Souda Bay, Crete, Rhodes, Greece, and Larnaca, Cyprus. The crew participated in community relations projects at every port. The ship also stopped for fuel in Funchal, Madeira and Naval Station Rota in Spain. During Mahan's visit to Rhodes, Commander Zoah Scheneman relieved Commander Adam Aycock as commanding officer on 7 May 2013. Mahan remained in theater after the Ghouta chemical attack in Syria. Mahan returned on 13 September 2013, and had a pinning ceremony for ten (10) chief petty officer selects as soon as the ship was moored.

On 9 January 2017, Sky News reported that whilst escorting two other US ships, the USS Mahan fired three warning shots at four Iranian Islamic Revolutionary Guard boats in the Strait of Hormuz after the Iranians did not respond to requests by the Mahan to slow down and instead continued asking the ship questions, coming to within 800m of the Mahan. According to the officials speaking anonymously to Reuters, a helicopter dropped a smoke float and the destroyer launched flares but the boats continued at speed. A similar incident occurred on 24 April 2017.

== Coat of arms ==
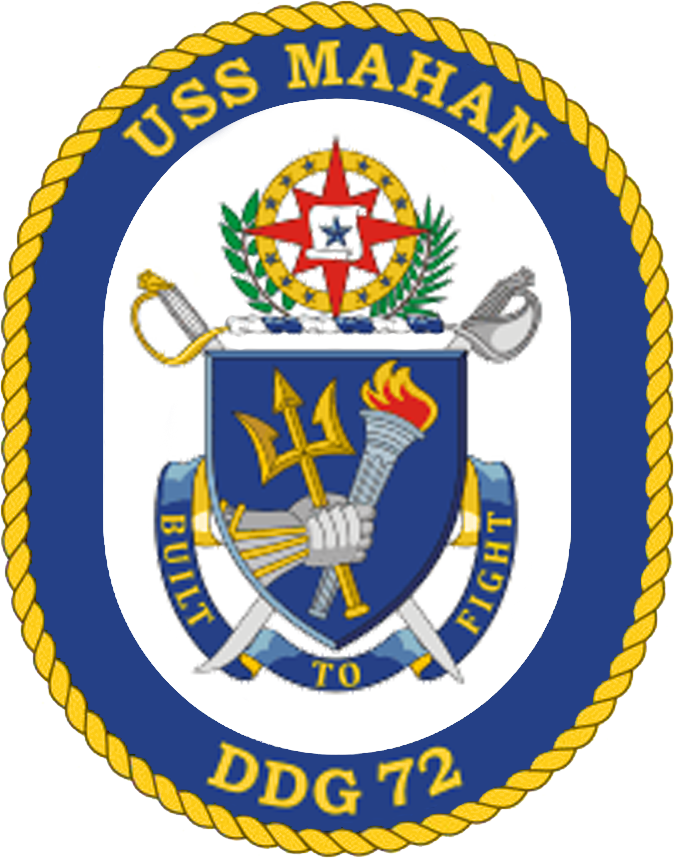

=== Shield ===
The shield has background of dark blue with a blue trim. The center of the shield shows a gauntlet wielding a trident and a torch.

The traditional Navy colors were chosen for the shield because dark blue and gold represents the sea and excellence respectively. The trident at the center of the shield symbolizes the ship's warfare capabilities while underscoring the importance of a strong navy. The gauntlet and torch are adapted from USS Mahan (DD-364)'s emblem highlighting the ship's namesake, Rear Admiral Alfred Thayer Mahan, as the father of all modern navies. The tines of the trident represent the three previous ships named Mahan, and the Officer, Chief Petty Officer, and Enlisted Corps of personnel which man the ship.

=== Crest ===
The crest consists of a red compass enclosed in a gold annulet surrounded by a wreath.

The central star commemorates the second USS Mahan's World War II battle honors (five battle stars), earned before she was sunk by kamikazes. The twelve small stars on the annulet denote the battle stars of the third USS Mahan (DDG-42) for service in the Vietnam War. The unfurled scroll underscores Mahan as the author of The Influence of Sea Power Upon History. The compass rose and annulet represent Mahan's influence of sea power, its strategy and geopolitical importance worldwide. The wreath combines laurel and palm to symbolize honor and victory.

=== Motto ===
The motto is written on a scroll of blue that has a gold reverse side.

The ship's motto is "Built to Fight." The motto was chosen as a remembrance of Admiral Arleigh Burke in memory of his contributions to the U.S. Navy. During USS Arleigh Burke's commissioning, Admiral Burke issued a challenge to his sailors: “This ship is built to fight; you’d better know how.”

=== Seal ===
The coat of arms in full color as in the blazon, upon a white background enclosed within a dark blue oval border edged on the outside with a gold rope and bearing the inscription "USS MAHAN" at the top and "DDG 72" in the base all gold.

== Awards ==
Ribbon	Description	Notes
Ribbon of the PUC	Presidential Unit Citation	28 Feb 2026 - 01 May 2026
Ribbon of the NMUC	Navy Meritorious Unit Commendation Ribbon	
	Navy "E" Ribbon	with three Battle E devices
	National Defense Service Medal	
Ribbon of the GWTEM	Global War on Terrorism Expeditionary Medal	
Ribbon of the GWTSM	Global War on Terrorism Service Medal	
	Navy Sea Service Deployment Ribbon	with one silver service star
