= Naval Forces Japan (United States) =

Command of the United States Navy in Japan

Commander, U.S. Naval Forces Japan Navy Region Japan
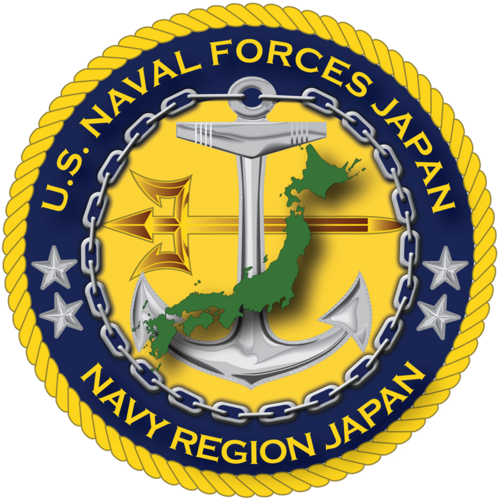
- Command insignia of Commander, U.S. Naval Forces Japan and Navy Region Japan
- Active: February 1, 1962 – present
- Country: United States
- Branch: United States Navy
- Type: Region Commander
- Role: Acts as Navy representative and coordinator Japan for shore installation management
- Part of: Commander, Navy Installations Command; Commander, United States Pacific Fleet
- HQ: Yokosuka, Japan
- Nickname: CNFJ
- Website: cnrj.cnic.navy.mil

Commanders
- Current commander: RDML Ian L. Johnson

The U.S. Naval Forces Japan/Navy Region Japan (CNFJ/CNRJ) is a dual-hatted command with command and control authority of all shore installations and assigned forces of the United States Navy in Japan as well as the responsibility to liaise with the Japanese Maritime Self-Defense Force (JMSDF). It is currently headquartered in Yokosuka, Japan, onboard United States Fleet Activities Yokosuka. CNFJ/CNRJ's area of responsibility extends from the southern tip of the Kamchatka Peninsula to the northern tip of Taiwan and, the Singapore area of operations, and the Indian Ocean British Territory of Diego Garcia, but excludes the Korean Peninsula.

== Mission ==
As a dual-hatted commander, CNFJ/CNRJ reports to Commander, U.S. Pacific Fleet for operational concerns and to Commander, Navy Installations Command for administrative and installation matters. The difference between the two titles is that CNFJ exerts operational control (OPCON) over shore-based Naval personnel in Japan, whereas CNRJ has administrative control of the installations and facilities. Essentially, this means that all shore-based Naval forces in Japan are under the command and control of CNFJ/CNRJ.

However, ships and their personnel that are "forward deployed" to Japan (which essentially is their home port) are excluded because they are operationally assigned to United States Seventh Fleet.

CNFJ/CNRJ is also only one of three Navy Regions to be commanded by a two-star admiral, along with Navy Region Mid-Atlantic and Navy Region Europe, Africa, Southwest Asia.

== History ==
In August 1945 the U.S. Pacific Liaison Group with the Supreme Commander for the Allied Powers (FLTLOSCAP) was established to carry out initial naval activities related to the Allied occupation of Japan. On 28 January 1946 FLTLOSCAP was dissolved and Naval Activities, Japan (COMNAVJAP) was established under the command of Vice Admiral R. M. Griffin, who retained this command until 9 July 1948 when he was relieved by Vice Admiral Russell M. Berkey.

When the Far East Command was established on 1 January 1947, Admiral Griffin was redesignated Commander Naval Forces, Far East (COMNAVFE), with the proviso that the title "Commander Naval Forces, Japan," would be used in connection with duties involving the Allied relationships for which Admiral Griffin was responsible to SCAP. On that same date Commander, Naval Activities, Japan, Commander, Naval Operating Base, Okinawa, and Commander, Naval Forces, Philippines, reported to CINCFE for duty while Commander, Marianas, reported for operational control. CINCFE in turn reassigned these responsibilities to COMNAVFE.

Naval Forces Japan was initially a subordinate command of Naval Forces Far East (NAVFE), which in turn from January 1, 1947, was part of Far East Command. NAVFE consisted of:

- Task Force 90 (Amphibious Force, Far East)
- Task Force 93 (Naval Forces Philippines)
- Task Force 94 (Commander Naval Forces Marianas)
- Task Force 96 (Naval Forces Japan)

On 3 April 1951, NAVFE was restructured. As a result, the Service Forces, previously fragmented among separate United States Seventh Fleet and NAVFE groups, were consolidated into a new Logistics Group, designated Task Force 92.

In March, 1952, the geographical boundaries of NAVFE were changed to exclude the Philippines, Marianas, Bonin and Volcano Islands.

== Current Subordinate Commands ==
- Naval Air Facility Atsugi
- Naval Air Facility Misawa onboard Misawa Air Base (support services to Naval personnel)
- Naval Support Facility Diego Garcia
- United States Fleet Activities Yokosuka
- United States Fleet Activities Sasebo
- United States Fleet Activities Okinawa onboard Kadena Air Base (support services to Naval personnel)
- Singapore Area Coordinator
