= Destroyer Squadron 22 =

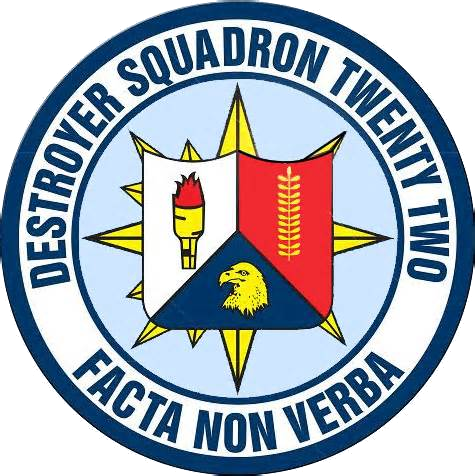
- Founded: 1943; 83 years ago
- Country: United States
- Branch: United States Navy
- Type: Destroyer squadron
- Part of: Carrier Strike Group Two
- Nickname: DESRON 22
- Motto: Facta Non Verba
- Website: https://www.surflant.usff.navy.mil/desron22/

Commanders
- Commodore: Captain Edward J. Pledger

Destroyer Squadron 22, often abbreviated as DESRON 22, is a squadron of warships of the United States Navy. It is an operational component of Carrier Strike Group Two. The squadron was formed in March 1943, and later was one of the first two squadrons of Arleigh Burke-class destroyers. Its unofficial motto is “The Fighting Double Duece.”

== Assigned ships ==
The squadron is currently made up of the following ships:

- USS Mitscher (DDG-57)
- USS Laboon (DDG-58)
- USS Mahan (DDG-72)
- USS Thomas Hudner (DDG-116)
- USS Porter (DDG-78)
