= Samuel L. Gravely Jr. =

United States Navy Vice Admiral

Samuel Lee Gravely Jr.
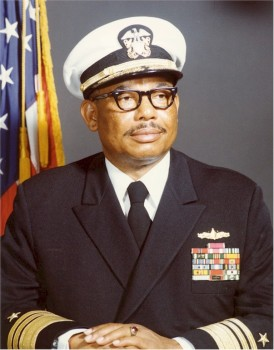
- Born: June 4, 1922; Richmond, Virginia, US
- Died: October 22, 2004 (aged 82); Bethesda, Maryland, US
- Burial place: Arlington National Cemetery
- Military career
- Allegiance: United States of America
- Branch: United States Navy
- Service years: 1942–1980
- Rank: Vice Admiral
- Commands: USS Theodore E. Chandler (DD-717); USS Falgout (DER-324); USS Taussig (DD-746); USS Jouett (DLG-29); Cruiser-Destroyer Group Two; Third Fleet; Defense Communications Agency
- Conflicts: World War II; Korean War; Vietnam War
- Awards: Legion of Merit (2); Bronze Star

Samuel Lee Gravely Jr. (June 4, 1922 – October 22, 2004) was a United States Navy officer. He was the first African American in the U.S. Navy to serve aboard a fighting ship as an officer, the first to command a Navy ship, the first fleet commander, and the first to become a flag officer, retiring as a vice admiral.

== Early life and training ==
Gravely was born on June 4, 1922, in Richmond, Virginia, the oldest of five children of Mary George Gravely and postal worker Samuel L. Gravely Sr. He attended Virginia Union University but left before graduating to join the Naval Reserve in 1942. He had attempted to enlist in the U.S. Army in 1940 but was turned away due to a supposed heart murmur.

After receiving basic training at Naval Station Great Lakes, Illinois, Gravely entered the V-12 Navy College Training Program at the University of California, Los Angeles. Upon graduating from UCLA, he completed Midshipmen's School at Columbia University and was commissioned an ensign on December 14, 1944. His commission came only eight months after the "Golden Thirteen" became the first African-American officers in the U.S. Navy.

== World War II and Korean War ==
Gravely began his seagoing career as the only black officer aboard the submarine chaser USS PC-1264, which was one of two U.S. Navy ships (the other being USS Mason (DE-529)) with a predominantly black enlisted crew. Before June 1, 1942, African Americans could only enlist in the Navy as messmen; PC-1264 and Mason were intended to test the ability of African Americans to perform general Navy service. For the remainder of World War II, PC-1264 conducted patrols and escort missions along the east coast of the U.S. and south to the Caribbean.

In 1946, Gravely was released from active duty, remaining in the Naval Reserve. He married schoolteacher Alma Bernice Clark later that year; the couple went on to raise three children, Robert, David, and Tracey. He returned to his hometown of Richmond and re-enrolled at Virginia Union University, graduating in 1948 with a degree in history and then working as a railway postal clerk.

Gravely was recalled to active duty in 1949 and worked as a recruiter in Washington, D.C., before holding both shore and sea assignments during the Korean War. During that time he served on the USS Iowa as a communications officer. He transferred from the Reserve to the regular Navy in 1955 and began to specialize in naval communications.

== Vietnam War and later career ==
Many of Gravely's later career achievements represented "firsts" for African Americans. From 15 February 1961 to 21 October 1961, he served as the first African-American officer to command a U.S. Navy ship, the USS Theodore E. Chandler (DD-717) (Robert Smalls had briefly commanded a Navy ship in the American Civil War, although he was a civilian, not a Navy officer). He also commanded the radar picket destroyer escort USS Falgout (DER-324) from January 1962 to June 1963. During the Vietnam War he commanded the destroyer USS Taussig (DD-746) as it performed plane guard duty and gunfire support off the coast of Vietnam in 1966, making him the first African American to lead a ship into combat. In 1967 he became the first African American to reach the rank of captain, and in 1971 the first to reach rear admiral.

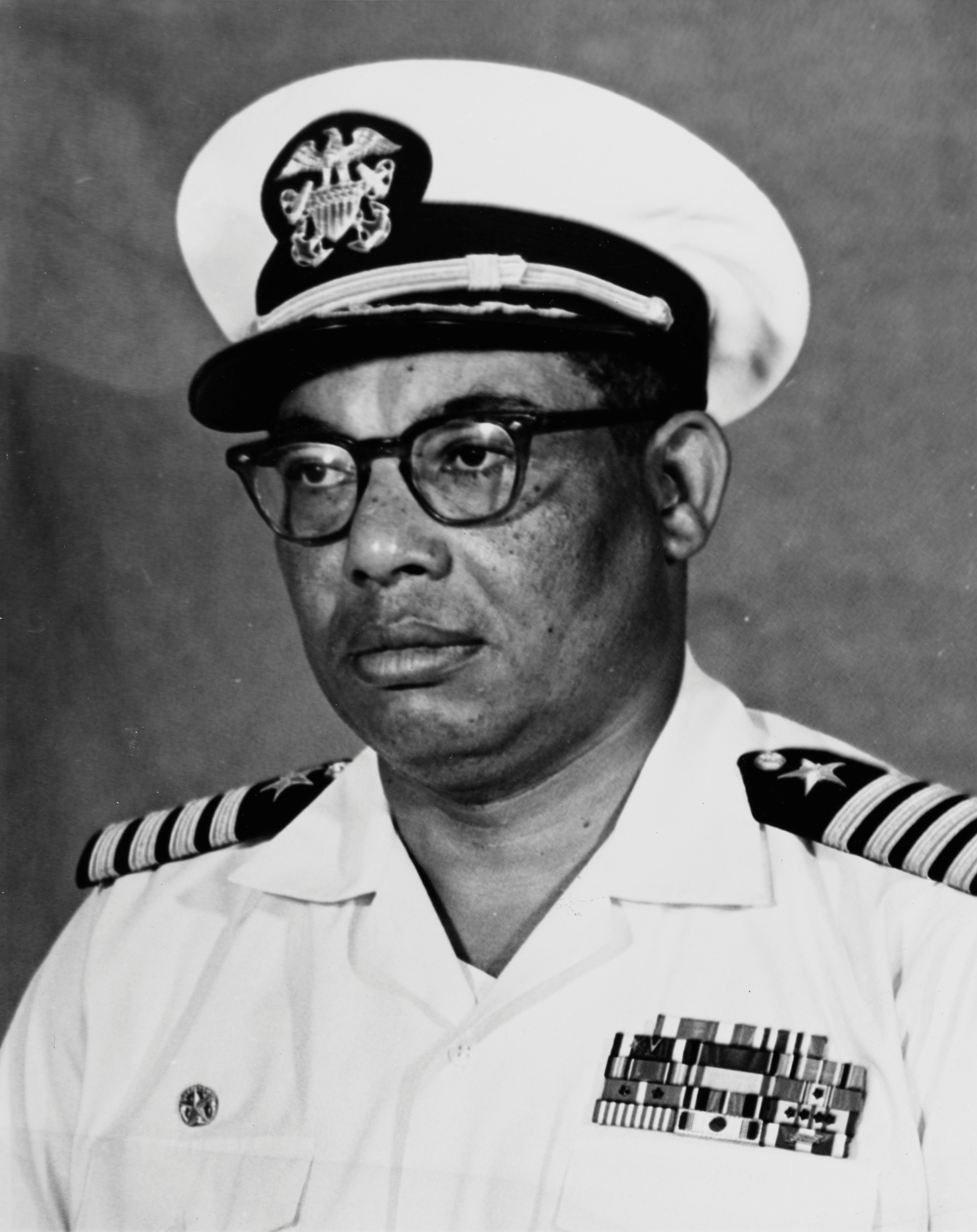
Capt. Samuel Gravely, U.S. Navy photograph circa 1970.

At the time of his promotion to rear admiral, he was in command of the guided missile frigate USS Jouett (DLG-29). Gravely commanded Cruiser-Destroyer Group 2. He was later named the Director of Naval Communications. From 1976 to 1978, he commanded the Third Fleet based in Hawaii, then transferred to Virginia to direct the Defense Communications Agency until his retirement in 1980.

Gravely's military decorations include the Legion of Merit, Bronze Star Medal, Meritorious Service Medal and Navy Commendation Medal. He was also awarded the World War II Victory Medal, the Korean Service Medal with two service stars, the United Nations Korea Medal, and the Republic of Korea Presidential Unit Citation.

== Later years and legacy ==
Following his military retirement, Gravely settled in rural Haymarket, Virginia, and worked as a consultant. An elementary school in Haymarket has been named the Samuel L. Gravely Jr. Elementary School in his honor.

After suffering a stroke, Gravely died at the National Naval Medical Center in Bethesda, Maryland, on October 22, 2004. He was buried in Arlington National Cemetery.

In Richmond, the street on which Gravely grew up was renamed "Admiral Gravely Boulevard" in 1977. Samuel L. Gravely, Jr. Elementary School in Haymarket, Virginia was named after him in 2008. The destroyer USS Gravely (DDG-107), commissioned in 2010, was named in his honor.

Vice Admiral Gravely is honored annually in San Pedro, California, aboard Battleship Iowa, at the Gravely Celebration Experience. Each year the organization honors trailblazers exemplifying VADM Gravely's leadership and service with the Leadership & Service Award. An essay competition for U.S. History high school students that explores VADM Gravely's motto — “Education, Motivation, Perseverance” — is affiliated with the annual event.

== See also ==
- List of African-American firsts
- Military history of African Americans
