= Proud (film) =

- Promotional poster
- Directed by: Mary Pat Kelly
- Written by: Mary Pat Kelly
- Produced by: Ally Hilfiger
- Starring: Ossie Davis; Stephen Rea; Aidan Quinn; Albert Jones
- Cinematography: Thom Marini
- Edited by: David Kausch; H. Spencer Young
- Music by: Tasso Zapanti
- Production company: THEntertainment
- Distributed by: Castle Hill Productions
- Release date: November 11, 2004 (High Falls Film Festival)
- Running time: 87 minutes
- Country: United States
- Language: English

Proud is a 2004 film directed by Mary Pat Kelly and stars veteran actor and activist Ossie Davis in his final film performance. The motion picture was filmed in Elmira and Buffalo, New York. The screenplay was written by Kelly based on her non-fiction book Proudly We Served (1999).

Proud was an official selection of the third annual Buffalo International Film Festival in 2009. Mary Pat Kelly and Lorenzo Dufau (last surviving crew member) introduced the screening.

== Premise ==
The film focuses on the meritorious service of the USS Mason (DE-529) of World War II, the first US Navy ship with a predominantly African-American crew, and how three of the men were finally honored in January 1994 for their meritorious service.

== Cast ==
- Reggie Austin as Dubois
- Vernel Bagneris as Larry's Father
- Marcus Chait as Lieutenant Westin
- Michael Ciesla as Yeoman of the Flagship
- Ossie Davis as Lorenzo DuFau
- Eric LaRay Harvey as Kevin / James Graham
- Rashad Haughton as Hank Fields
- Janet Hubert as Larry's Mother
- Albert Jones as Larry / Young Lorenzo DuFau
- Kidada Jones as Gordon's sister
- Jeffrey Nash as Marcus / Gordon Buchanan
- Denise Nicholas as Gordon's Mother
- Edward O'Blenis as Watkins
- Aidan Quinn as Commodore Alfred Lind
- Stephen Rea as Barney Garvey
- Darnell Williams as Thomas Young, war correspondent

== Reception ==
=== Critical response ===
When the film was released, Ronnie Scheib, film critic at Variety, gave the film a mixed review, writing, "A weird hodgepodge, Proud is part history lesson, part family saga, a lyrical nod to the Old Sod, a Navy recruitment flag-waver, and a war actioner. Earnest, intermittently rousing pic, skedded for a fall opening, should coast on Davis' masterful performance before being archived by cable for suitable occasions...Pic's overall structure is determined both by Davis' narration and by the presence of black war correspondent Thomas Young (Darnell Williams), who was assigned to cover the Mason. His frequent to-the-camera interviews with sailors abstractly punctuate the film, creating a broader sociological framework...Aside from generally excellent combat scenes, pic is uneven. The bigoted animosity of a petty officer, for instance, or the Admiral's dismissal of the captain's praise of his crew's valor as exaggeration unfold with the leaden sententiousness of a grade-school pageant."

Critic Marcia Davis with The Washington Post wrote, "The high purpose of Proud is not matched by the film's execution, however. It's worth seeing, but don't go expecting a traditional Hollywood feature film. It is rather oddly executed and uneven, unlike the well-known and controversial Glory, which won Denzel Washington his first Oscar, or the brilliant A Soldier's Story, adapted from Charles Fuller's A Soldier's Play. Proud is something of a hybrid, part documentary -- with actual footage from the Mason -- and part dramatization. It is at times deeply poignant when it talks about the longing of black men to be treated as men and what they went through to prove their worthiness. It can also be a bit of an unrestrained flag-waver on black American patriotism."

=== Accolades ===
Nominated

- Black Reel Awards: Best Independent Film, Mary Pat Kelly; 2006

== Distribution ==
Film festivals

- High Falls Film Festivals: November 11, 2004, Rochester, New York
- Tribeca Film Festival: April 23, 2005, New York, New York
- Lake Placid Film Festival: Lake Placid, New York
- Urbanworld Film Festival: New York, New York
- Buffalo International Film Festival: Buffalo, New York
