= USS Gravely =

U.S. Navy guided missile destroyer

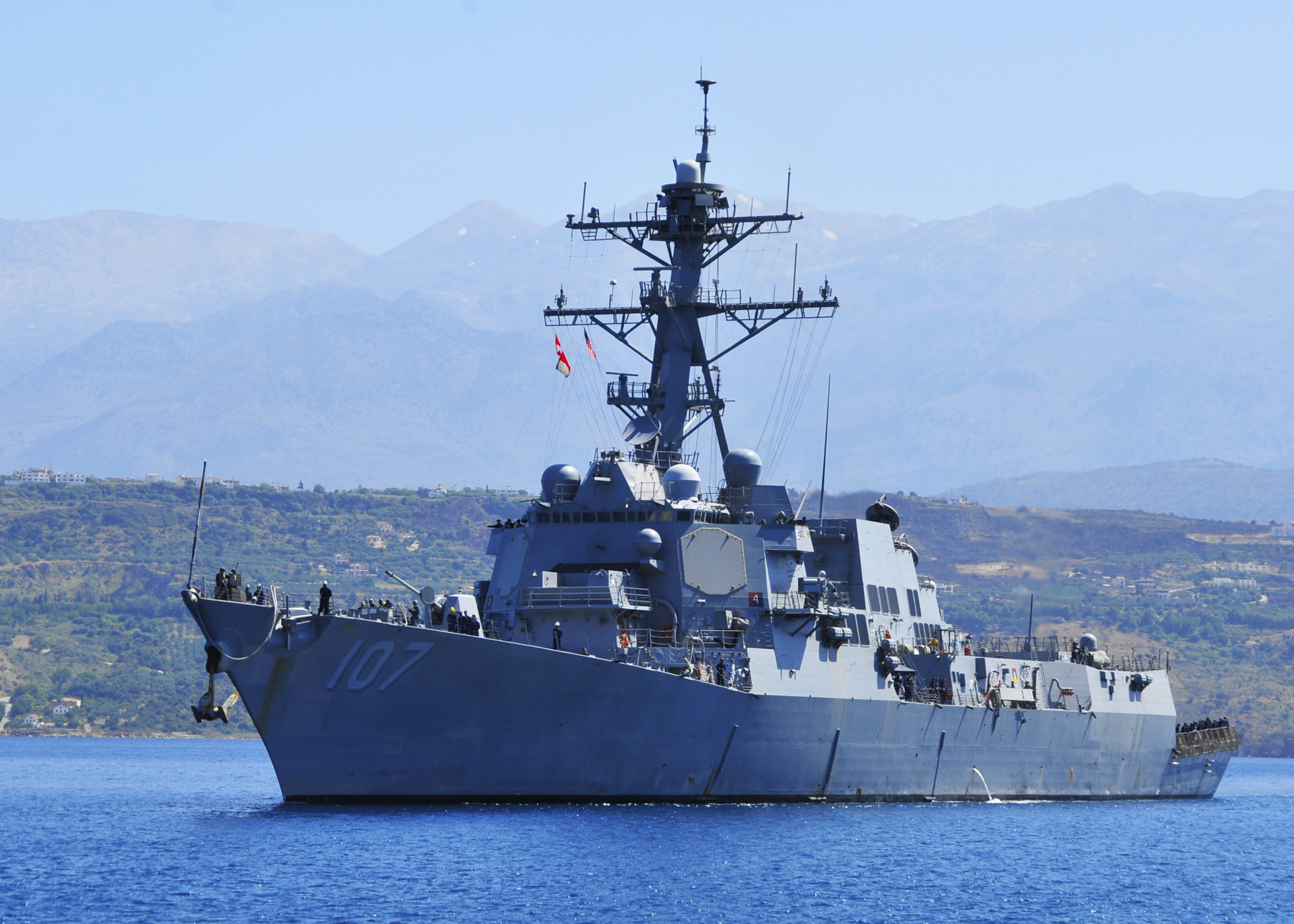
- USS Gravely in 2013

History

United States
- Name: Gravely
- Namesake: Samuel L. Gravely, Jr.
- Awarded: 13 September 2002
- Builder: Ingalls Shipbuilding
- Laid down: 26 November 2007
- Launched: 30 March 2009
- Sponsored by: Alma Gravely
- Christened: 16 May 2009
- Commissioned: 20 November 2010
- Home port: Norfolk
- Identification: MMSI number: 369970634; Callsign: NSLG; Hull number: DDG-107
- Motto: First To Conquer
- Status: in active service
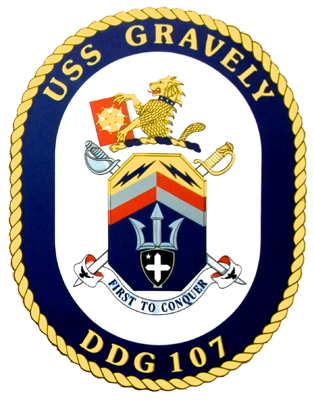
- Badge

General characteristics
- Class & type: Arleigh Burke-class destroyer
- Displacement: 9,200 long tons (9,300 t)
- Length: 509 ft 6 in (155.30 m)
- Beam: 66 ft (20 m)
- Draft: 33 ft (10 m)
- Propulsion: 4 × General Electric LM2500-30 gas turbines, 2 shafts, 100,000 shp (75 MW)
- Speed: 30 kn (56 km/h; 35 mph)
- Complement: 312 officers and enlisted
- Armament: Guns: 1 × 5-inch (127 mm)/62 Mk 45 Mod 4 (lightweight gun); 1 × 20 mm (0.8 in) Phalanx CIWS; 2 × 25 mm (0.98 in) Mk 38 machine gun system; 4 × 0.50 in (12.7 mm) caliber guns; Missiles: 1 × 32-cell, 1 × 64-cell (96 total cells) Mk 41 vertical launching system (VLS): RIM-66M surface-to-air missile; RIM-156 surface-to-air missile; RIM-174A Standard ERAM; RIM-161 anti-ballistic missile; RIM-162 ESSM (quad-packed); BGM-109 Tomahawk cruise missile; RUM-139 vertical launch ASROC; Torpedoes: 2 × Mark 32 triple torpedo tubes: Mark 46 lightweight torpedo; Mark 50 lightweight torpedo; Mark 54 lightweight torpedo
- Aircraft carried: 2 × MH-60R Seahawk helicopters

USS Gravely (DDG-107) is an Arleigh Burke-class (Flight IIA) Aegis guided missile destroyer in the United States Navy. She is named after Vice Admiral Samuel L. Gravely Jr. Commissioned in 2010, she has been on several overseas deployments.

== Construction ==
Gravely is the 57th destroyer in her class. She was authorized on 13 September 2002 and her keel was laid down on 26 November 2007 at Northrop Grumman Shipbuilding's Ingalls Shipbuilding shipyard in Pascagoula, Mississippi. Gravely was launched on 30 March 2009. The ship is named after Vice Admiral Samuel L. Gravely, Jr., the first African American in the U.S. Navy to serve aboard a fighting ship as an officer, the first to command a Navy ship, the first fleet commander, and the first to become a flag officer, retiring as a vice admiral. Admiral Gravely's wife, Alma Gravely, christened the ship on 16 May 2009 and serves as ship's sponsor. Retired Navy Admiral J. Paul Reason was the principal speaker at the ceremony, which was held at Northrop's facility in Pascagoula. She successfully completed sea trials in June 2010. Gravely, Northrop Grumman's 27th Aegis equipped guided missile destroyer, was commissioned at Wilmington, North Carolina on 20 November 2010.

== Service history ==
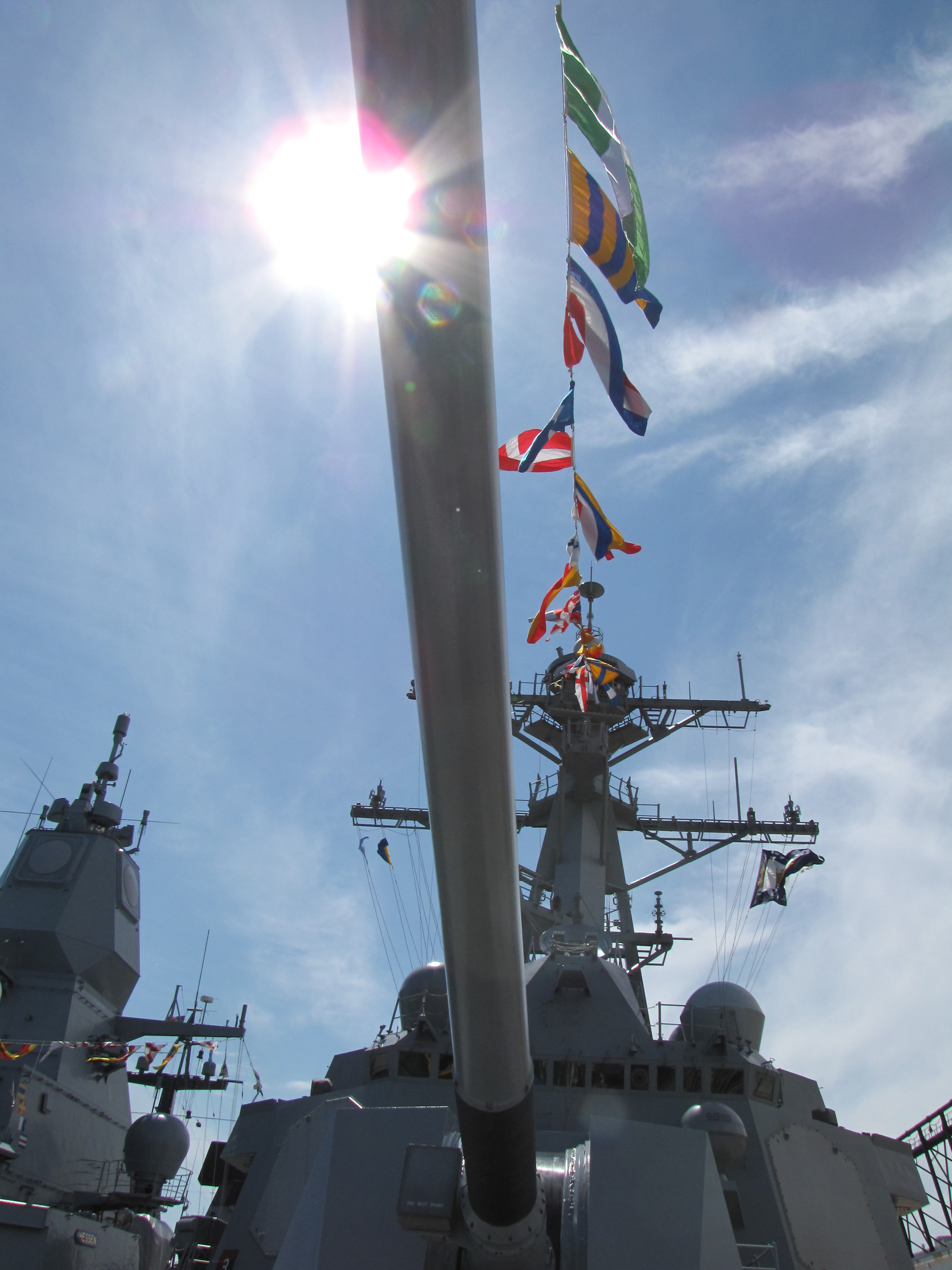
Forward 5 in/62 caliber gun of USS Gravely. Taken during Fleet Week 2012 in Boston. The superstructure of a German destroyer is in the left background.

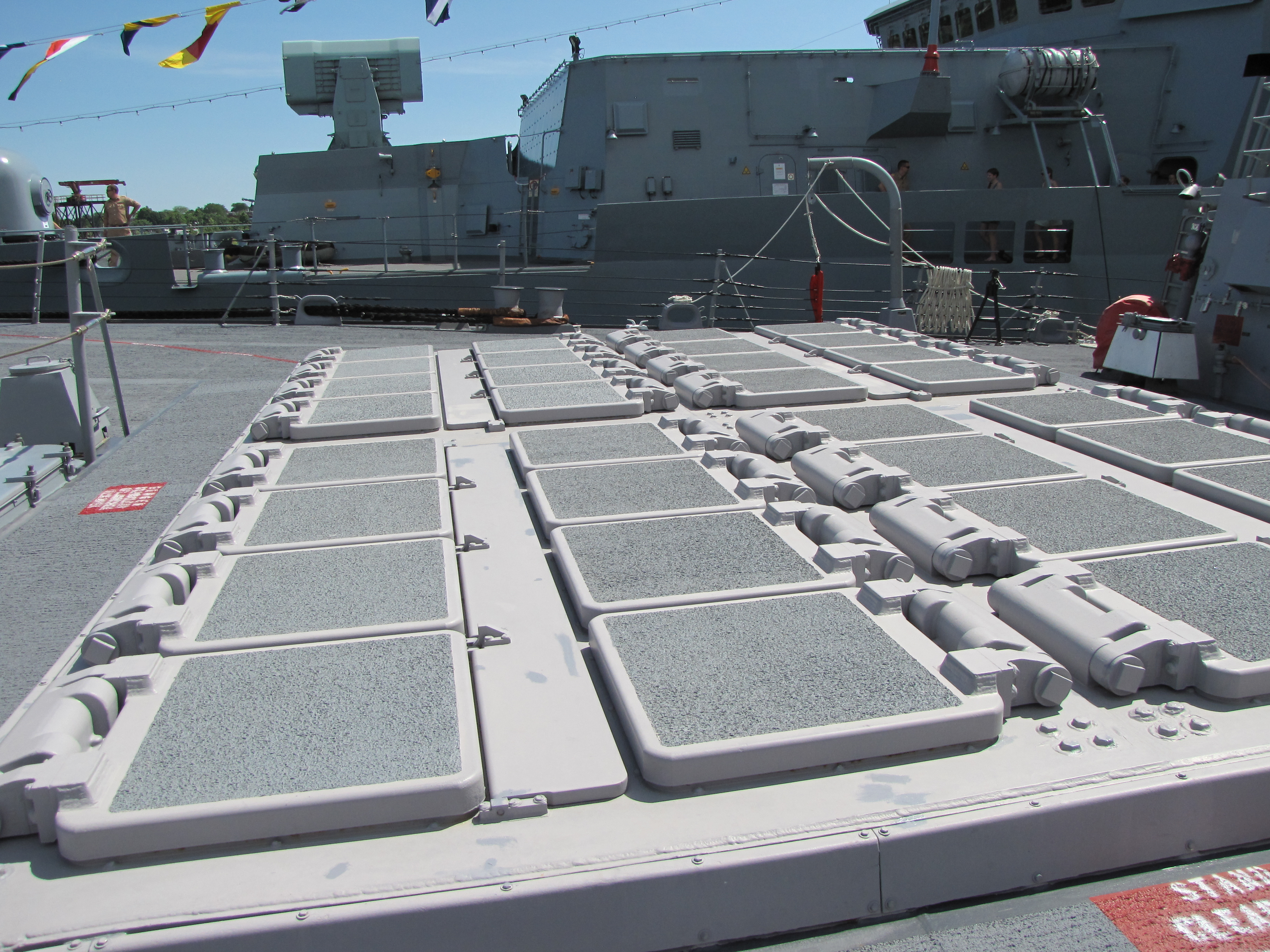
Gravely fore VLS. Picture taken during Fleet Week 2012 in Boston. The ship in the background is a German destroyer.

In late August 2013 along with her sister ships Mahan, Barry, and Ramage, Gravely was sent to patrol the eastern Mediterranean Sea in response to rising rumors of an imminent U.S. military intervention in the Syrian civil war. On 28 October 2013, the destroyers Gravely and Ramage answered a distress call from a vessel carrying immigrants located 160 nautical miles (300 km; 180 mi) off the coast of Kalamata, Greece. On 18 November 2013, Gravely returned to Naval Station Norfolk, Virginia, completing her first overseas deployment.

On 28 March 2016, Gravely provided assistance to USS Sirocco, which had seized a stateless dhow transporting weapons. Once the weapons were offloaded, the dhow and its crew were released. In June 2016 while escorting the aircraft carrier USS Harry S. Truman the destroyer had a close encounter with a Russian Navy frigate, causing Russian and U.S. Navy officials to accuse each other of dangerous and unprofessional conduct. On 11 March 2019, as part of Carrier Strike Group Eight (CSG-8), Gravely received the Meritorious Unit Commendation award in support of Operation Inherent Resolve during the 2015–2016 deployment.

On 13 May 2022, Gravely took part in a PASSEX training with the Finnish and Swedish navies in the northern Baltic Sea. In May 2022, Gravely was homeported out of Naval Station Norfolk and a part of Destroyer Squadron 28, along with Carrier Strike Group 8 led by Harry S. Truman.

On 24 June 2022, Gravely returned to Norfolk.

On 28 October 2025, USS Gravely docked in Trinidad and Tobago, approximately 10 nautical miles (18.5 kilometers) from Venezuelan waters, amid rising tensions with Venezuela related to the ongoing drug war. The ship departed three days later, on 31 October.

=== United States–Houthi conflict (2023–present) ===
On 14 October 2023, Lloyd Austin directed Dwight D. Eisenhower and her carrier strike group, which included the cruiser Philippine Sea, along with Gravely and sister-destroyers Laboon and Mason, to the eastern Mediterranean in response to the Gaza war. This was the second carrier strike group to be sent to the region in response to the conflict, following Gerald R. Ford and her group, which was dispatched six days earlier.

On 30 December 2023, the Danish container ship Maersk Hangzhou issued a distress call after coming under fire from four small ships commanded by Iranian-backed Houthi rebels from Yemen. Attempts were also made to board Maersk Hangzhou by force, while a contracted security team defended the ship. Gravely and Dwight D. Eisenhower responded to a distress call from the container ship. Verbal commands were radioed to the Houthi ships, while helicopters from Dwight D. Eisenhower were dispatched. After taking small-arms fire, U.S. Navy helicopters returned fire, sinking three of the four Houthi ships. There was no damage to U.S. equipment or personnel. In the process of responding to the distress call, Gravely shot down two anti-ship ballistic missiles fired from Yemen.

On 12 January 2024, Gravely along with Mason and Philippine Sea fired Tomahawk cruise missiles at Houthi rebels in Yemen. Aircraft from Carrier Air Wing Three embarked on Dwight D. Eisenhower participated in the strikes.

On 30 January 2024, Gravely used her Phalanx CIWS to shoot down an incoming anti-ship cruise missile fired by the Houthis. U.S. officials said that the missile came within a mile of the destroyer. No damage or injuries were reported.

On 15 March 2025, U.S. Northern Command deployed Gravely to the Gulf of Mexico to help assist with border security operations.

== Awards ==
- Combat Action Ribbon – (October 2023 – April 2024)
- Navy Unit Commendation – (Oct 2023 – May 2024)
- Meritorious Unit Commendation – (2015–2016)
- Arizona Memorial Trophy – (2021–2022)
