= Marcus Chait =

American actor

- Born: Marcus E. Chait; March 18, 1973 (age 53); Menlo Park, California, U.S.
- Occupations: Actor; producer
- Years active: 1998–present
- Spouse: Melissa Bell
- Children: 2

Marcus E. Chait (born March 18, 1973) is an American film and television actor and producer.

== Early life ==
Chait was born in Menlo Park, California on March 18, 1973. He went to school at Menlo-Atherton high school where he played football and helped start the boys volleyball team.

He went to University of California, Santa Barbara majoring in psychology but then transferred to Carnegie Mellon University, where he double majored in Acting for Film and Television as well as Acting for Musical Theater.

== Career ==
His television appearances include ER, CSI: Miami and Terminator: The Sarah Connor Chronicles.

He appeared in films such as Million Dollar Baby, North Country and Proud.

On Broadway, he starred in the original casts of URBAN COWBOY and THE PIRATE QUEEN, and played Christian opposite Frank Langella in CYRANO DE BERGERAC at The Roundabout.

Marcus founded the Film and New Media division for Author Solutions, the largest self publishing label in the world, where he produced thousands of pieces of original content, most notably the film MALEVOLENT which was sold to Netflix. The company was acquired in 2012 by Penguin Books.

He currently owns and operates two businesses in the San Francisco Bay Area: 66mint Fine Estate Jewelry (www.66mint.com) and Silicon Valley Diamond & Jewelry Buyers (www.SVDJB.com)

Marcus is one of the lead producers of THE LOST BOYS, a new musical opening at The Palace Theatre on Broadway in Spring of 2026 based on the iconic 1980's Warner Bros film. www.lostboysmusical.com

== Personal life ==
He is married to Melissa Bell. They have two children.

== Filmography ==
=== Film ===
Year	Title	Role	Notes
2004	Proud	Lieutenant Westin	
2004	Million Dollar Baby	J.D. Fitzgerald	
2005	North Country	Wayne	
2006	Argo	Cal	Short film

=== Television ===
Year	Title	Role	Notes
2003	Tarzan	Gary Lang	Episode: "Emotional Rescue"
2004	Crossing Jordan	Alex Dwyer / Ernie Pitts	Episode: "He Said, She Said"
2004	CSI: Miami	Chad Gilbert	Episode: "Speed Kills"
2005	Charmed	Vicus	Episode: "Imaginary Friends"
2008	Terminator: The Sarah Connor Chronicles	Justin Tuck	Episode: "Samson & Delilah"
2008	NCIS	Cole Erickson	Episode: "Capitol Offense"
2008	House	Mitch	Episode: "Last Resort"

=== Stage ===
Year	Title	Role	Notes
2003	Urban Cowboy	Wes	
2007	The Pirate Queen	Donal O'Flaherty	
