= USS Falgout =

1943 Edsall-class destroyer escort

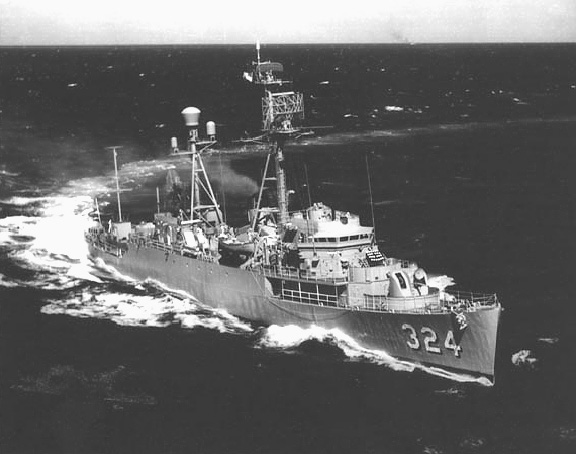

History

United States
- Name: USS Falgout
- Namesake: George Irvin Falgout (1922-1942), Navy Cross recipient
- Builder: Consolidated Steel Corporation, Orange, Texas
- Laid down: 24 May 1943
- Launched: 24 July 1943
- Commissioned: 15 November 1943
- Decommissioned: 10 October 1969
- Reclassified: DER-324, 28 October 1954
- Stricken: 1 June 1975
- Fate: Sunk as target off California on 12 January 1977

United States
- Name: USCGC Falgout (WDE-424)
- Commissioned: 24 August 1951
- Decommissioned: 21 May 1954
- Fate: Returned to USN, 21 May 1954

General characteristics
- Class & type: Edsall-class destroyer escort
- Displacement: 1,253 tons standard; 1,590 tons full load
- Length: 306 feet (93.27 m)
- Beam: 36.58 feet (11.15 m)
- Draft: 10.42 full load feet (3.18 m)
- Propulsion: 4 FM diesel engines, 4 diesel-generators, 6,000 shp (4.5 MW), 2 screws
- Speed: 21 knots (39 km/h)
- Range: 9,100 nmi. at 12 knots; (17,000 km at 22 km/h)
- Complement: 8 officers, 201 enlisted
- Armament: 3 × single 3 in (76 mm)/50 guns; 1 × twin 40 mm AA guns; 8 × single 20 mm AA guns; 1 × triple 21 in (533 mm) torpedo tubes; 8 × depth charge projectors; 1 × depth charge projector (hedgehog); 2 × depth charge tracks

USS Falgout (DE-/DER-324) was an Edsall-class destroyer escort built for the United States Navy during World War II. She served in the Atlantic Ocean and provided destroyer escort protection against submarine and air attack for Navy vessels and convoys. Post-war, she was borrowed by the United States Coast Guard and also served as a radar picket ship on the Distant Early Warning Line. She was reclassified DER-324 on 28 October 1954.

== Namesake ==
George Irvin Falgout was born on 28 October 1922 in Raceland, Louisiana. He enlisted in the United States Naval Reserve 19 February 1942. Seaman Second Class Falgout was killed in action in the Naval Battle of Guadalcanal on 12 November 1942, while serving on the USS San Francisco when he remained at his gun, firing at a Japanese aircraft until it crashed into his station. Seaman Second Class he was posthumously awarded the Navy Cross.

== Construction and commissioning ==
Falgout (DE-324) was launched 24 July 1943 by Consolidated Steel Corp, Ltd., Orange, Texas; sponsored by Mrs. H. J. Guidry, sister of Seaman Second Class Falgout; and commissioned 15 November 1943.

== World War II North Atlantic operations ==
While bound for shakedown at Bermuda, on 4 December 1943 Falgout rescued eleven survivors of the torpedoed tanker SS Touchet from a lifeboat. Completing her shakedown, she began Atlantic convoy escort duty out of Norfolk, Virginia, and New York to North African ports, making eight such voyages between 3 February 1944 and 2 June 1945.

== Under Attack by Luftwaffe Aircraft ==
On 20 April 1944, in the Mediterranean, her convoy UGS 38 came under heavy attack by German aircraft. Before the concentrated antiaircraft fire of Falgout and the other escorts could drive them off, they blew up the transport SS Paul Hamilton, sank the destroyer USS Lansdale, and damaged several of the merchantmen. With the other escorts picking up survivors or escorting the damaged ships into the nearest port, Algiers, Falgout screened the convoy on to its original destination, Bizerte.

== Under Attack by Submarines ==
The homeward bound passage of this same voyage was also a difficult one; on 3 May, one of the escorts was torpedoed and had to put into Algiers for repairs. Two of the other escorts sank the submarine which had crippled their sister, but on 5 May, another of the escort (USS Fechteler) was torpedoed, and sank. Falgout and the remaining escorts brought the convoy safely home, not a merchantman lost. On her third convoy voyage, while Gibraltar-bound in the Mediterranean, Falgout took prisoner from the sea four downed German aviators.

== End-of-War Activity ==
Falgout arrived at Balboa, Panama Canal Zone, 25 June 1945, where she remained until 13 December, making good will visits to Nicaragua and Costa Rica, joining in defense problems, and training submarines. She returned to Charleston, South Carolina, 18 December, and on 9 February 1946 arrived at Green Cove Springs, Florida, where she was placed in commission in reserve 9 May 1946, and out of commission in reserve 18 April 1947.

== On Loan to the Coast Guard ==
Falgout was on loan to the United States Coast Guard between 24 August 1951 and 21 May 1954, in commission, as WDE 424, and commanded by CDR G. L. Rollins, USCG for duty as an ocean station vessel out of Tacoma, Washington.

== Conversion to Radar Picket Ship ==
Upon her return to the Navy, she was converted to a radar picket escort vessel, and was recommissioned 30 June 1955. After shakedown, she arrived at Seattle, Washington, 20 November for duty with the Continental Air Defense Command. Her primary mission was to serve as radar picket in the Early Warning System, and from Seattle, she served regular cycles of duty at sea on picket station under the helmsmanship of Robert J. Lydon. This vital mission was interrupted only for necessary overhauls and refresher training following them.

== Later service ==
From 19 March 1959 to 26 June 1969, Falgout was based at Pearl Harbor, continuing her protection of the United States through service on the Pacific Barrier. From 31 January 1962 to 7 June 1963, Falgout was commanded by Lieutenant Commander Samuel Gravely, who would later become the first African-American admiral in the United States Navy. From 1966 to 1969 Falgout served in Operation Market Time, Republic of Viet Nam.

== Final Decommissioning ==
Falgout was decommissioned at Mare Island, Vallejo, California on 10 October 1969 and struck from the Navy List on 1 June 1975. On 12 January 1977 she was sunk as target off California.

== Awards ==
- Combat Action Ribbon
- European–African–Middle Eastern Campaign Medal with one battle star
- World War II Victory Medal
- National Defense Service Medal with star
- Korean Service Medal
- Republic of Korea Presidential Unit Citation
- United Nations Service Medal Korea
- Korean War Service Medal
