= USS PC-1264 =

1943 PC-461-class submarine chaser

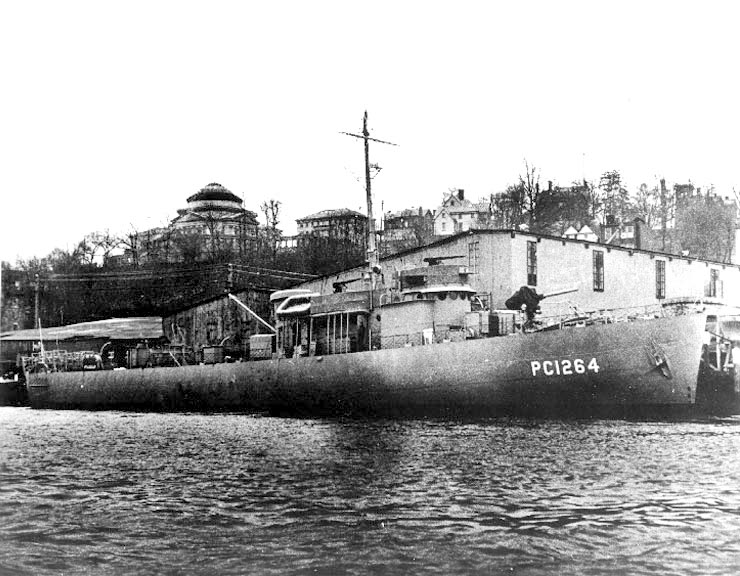
- USS PC 1264, New York, c. April 1944

History

United States
- Name: USS PC-1264
- Builder: Consolidated Shipbuilding Company, Morris Heights, Bronx, New York City, New York
- Laid down: 7 October 1943
- Launched: 28 November 1943
- Commissioned: 25 April 1944
- Decommissioned: 7 February 1946
- Fate: Sold for scrapping; extant, as of February 2008 at position 40.555899°N 74.217084°W

General characteristics
- Class & type: PC-461-class submarine chaser
- Displacement: 450 short tons (410 tonnes)
- Length: 173 ft 8 in (52.93 m)
- Beam: 23 ft 0 in (7.01 m)
- Draft: 10 ft 10 in (3.30 m)
- Propulsion: Two 1,280 bhp Hooven-Owens-Rentschler RB-99DA diesel engines, 2,560 bhp total
- Speed: 19 knots
- Complement: 65 officers and enlisted
- Armament: 1 × 3 in (76 mm)/50 gun, 1 × 40 mm gun, 5 × 20 mm guns, 2 × rocket launchers, 2 × depth charge projectors, 2 × depth charge tracks

USS PC-1264 was a PC-461-class submarine chaser built for the United States Navy during World War II. She was one of only two U.S. Navy ships to have a predominantly African-American enlisted complement during the war, the other being the Evarts-class destroyer escort USS Mason.

PC-1264 was in service for less than two years, but the performance of her crew—and of USS Mason's—led the U.S. Navy to reevaluate its perception of African Americans as members of the fleet. Although sold for scrapping, the ship remains at the Donjon Marine Yard in Rossville, Staten Island, New York.

== Career ==
USS PC-1264 was laid down at Consolidated Shipbuilding Company in Morris Heights, Bronx, New York, on 7 October 1943 and launched on 28 November 1943. PC-1264 was a United States Navy PC-461-class submarine chaser. This patrol class of submarine chaser was intended to intercept and destroy German U-boats stationed off the coast of the United States. Less expensive and faster to build than destroyers or even destroyer escorts, and requiring smaller crews, they quickly filled an important need for coastal convoy protection and anti-submarine warfare.

PC-1264 was commissioned in April 1944 and decommissioned in February 1946, serving a little less than 22 months as a U.S. Navy fighting ship.

=== Segregated ships ===
On 9 December 1941, the NAACP sent a telegram to Frank Knox, U.S. Secretary of the Navy, asking that African Americans be accepted into the navy in other than the messman branch. This request was refused. A 17 December letter from the NAACP to President Roosevelt resulted in the president turning the matter over to Mark Ethridge, chairman of the Fair Employment Practices Committee. This committee also received a negative response from the Navy Department. The president then sent a note to Secretary Knox stating:

I think that with all the Navy activities, BUNAV might find something that colored enlistees could do in addition to the rating of messman.

The navy's General Board, the group charged with the formulation of navy policy, countered with a suggestion that African Americans either be enlisted as messmen, or, "...if this proved not feasible," for general service. The problem was that the navy believed that integrated units would disrupt discipline aboard ships, entirely ignoring the fact that integrated crews had worked successfully aboard U.S. Navy ships during the American Civil War. The president responded, agreeing that "...to go the whole way in one fell swoop would seriously impair the general average efficiency of the Navy," but still felt that something could be worked out. On 27 March 1942, the Board replied, "The General Board fully recognizes, and appreciates the social and economic problems involved, and has striven to reconcile these requirements with what it feels must be paramount at any consideration, namely the maintenance at the highest level of the fighting efficiency of the Navy...", adding that "...if so ordered.." Negro units could be used "...with least disadvantage..." in shore establishments, local defense vessels, construction units and selected Coast Guard cutters.

On 7 April, the president 'so ordered,' and the navy announced that—beginning on 1 June—Negroes could enlist for the general service. As a result, the groundwork was laid for establishing African-American crews on USS Mason and USS PC-1264.

=== Commanding officers and POs ===
White officer Lieutenant Eric S. Purdon served as PC-1264's commanding officer from her commissioning on 25 April 1944 until 17 September 1945. He was replaced by his engineering officer, Lieutenant (jg) Ernest V. Hardman, who served as skipper until 31 October 1945. The third commanding officer was Lieutenant (jg) Jack W. Sutherland who came aboard on 31 October and helped decommission PC-1264 on 7 February 1946.

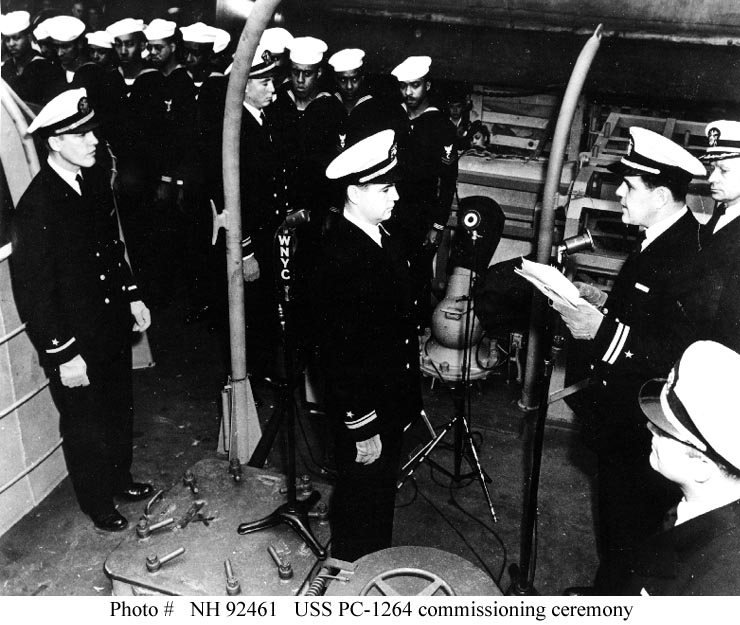
Lt. Eric Purdon, the ship's first commanding officer, reads the official orders directing him to assume command.

From that point, until PC-1264 was out of service, she was in the charge of African American Ensign Samuel L. Gravely Jr. Ensign Gravely had first reported aboard on 2 May 1945, and, at the time of the ship's decommissioning, was serving as her executive officer. PC-1264 was the first sailing assignment of future Admiral Gravely, the first African American to attain that rank.

In addition to the all-white officer complement, until the day Ensign Gravely reported aboard, eight white navy Petty Officers (PO), one in each specialty required on PC-1264, were also assigned to the ship. Their job was to train the African-American crew until Lt. Purdon considered some of the men expert enough in their specialty to rate promotion to petty officer. Months later, when eight African-American crewmen were promoted in their specialties, the white petty officers were transferred. This made PC-1264 the only U.S. Navy ship with a completely African-American crew, as USS Mason never replaced its white petty officers with African Americans.

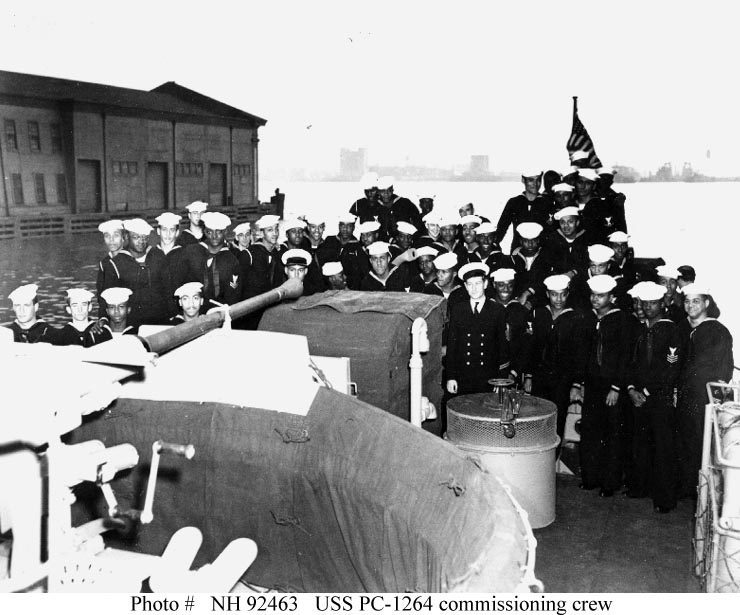
PC-1264's enlisted complement on the fantail, at the time of her commissioning ceremonies.

=== Training incidents ===
On 30 April 1944, after four days of intensive drills, PC-1264 went up the Hudson River to Iona Island to load ammunition for her guns for the first time. After loading, Lt. Purdon expected to moor there for the night, but was not allowed due to the danger from the large amount of ammunition stored there. Looking for a berth for the night, he called the duty office of the nearby U.S. Military Academy at West Point to ask if his ship could tie up at its pier. There was some confusion, as no Navy ship had tied up there in recent history. However, PC-1264, with its mostly African-American crew was made welcome, and numerous visitors walked along the dock inspecting her. In addition, the U.S. Army provided two buses, and many of the enlisted crewmen were taken on a tour of the academy under the guidance of knowledgeable sergeants.

Unfortunately for PC-1264, a number of other U.S. Navy bases and towns where the ship moored during its tour of duty did not extend the same hospitality as West Point. Especially in the southern United States, PC-1264's crew experienced various degrees of racial intolerance. For example, although most U.S. Navy seamen from nearby training facilities took their swimming tests off a pier at the municipal public beach at Miami Beach, on the day the crew of PC-1264 was supposed to qualify, the city of Miami Beach refused the use of its public beach for the training of Negroes.

At the Submarine Chaser Training Center in Miami, the civilian guards at the gate often took a long time inspecting the crew's ID cards and passes when the men were entering and leaving the base, far longer than the time spent inspecting white seamen. Then one day, this suddenly stopped. It took some time before the officers of PC-1264 were able to discover why. At a local bar, white seamen of another anti-submarine patrol craft had overheard civilians talking about going down to the base to shoot up the "nigger ship." These seamen returned to base, armed themselves with rifles and pistols without authorization and went to the gate to wait. When the nervous civilian guards asked what they were doing, the white seamen explained. After that the officers and crew of PC-1264 noticed that racial harassment at this base decreased significantly.

=== Shakedown cruise ===
After loading ammunition at Iona Island and leaving West Point, the ship sailed to Fort Lafayette to load depth charges. Then it reported to the United States Naval Frontier Base at Tompkinsville, Staten Island, New York, which became the PC-1264's home port. This base cared for the escort ships that accompanied convoys to many destinations. Once at Tompkinsville, the ship's crew continued training and calibrating their equipment, especially the ship's radio direction finder. Besides checking the structural strength of the hull and target practice on the range at Sandy Hook, the ship went through many other tests before going to sea for the first time. Finally, PC-1264 was ready for its shakedown cruise to the Submarine Chaser Training Center in Miami, Florida.

Upon arrival at Miami, the shakedown inspectors gave the ship and crew a rough going over for several days. However, the crew was jubilant when the ship received a glowing report. Leaving soon after on its first independent cruise, at about 10:35 am the ship encountered engine trouble and was stopped dead in the water far from land. After some delay, a naval tug returned the ship to post after midnight.

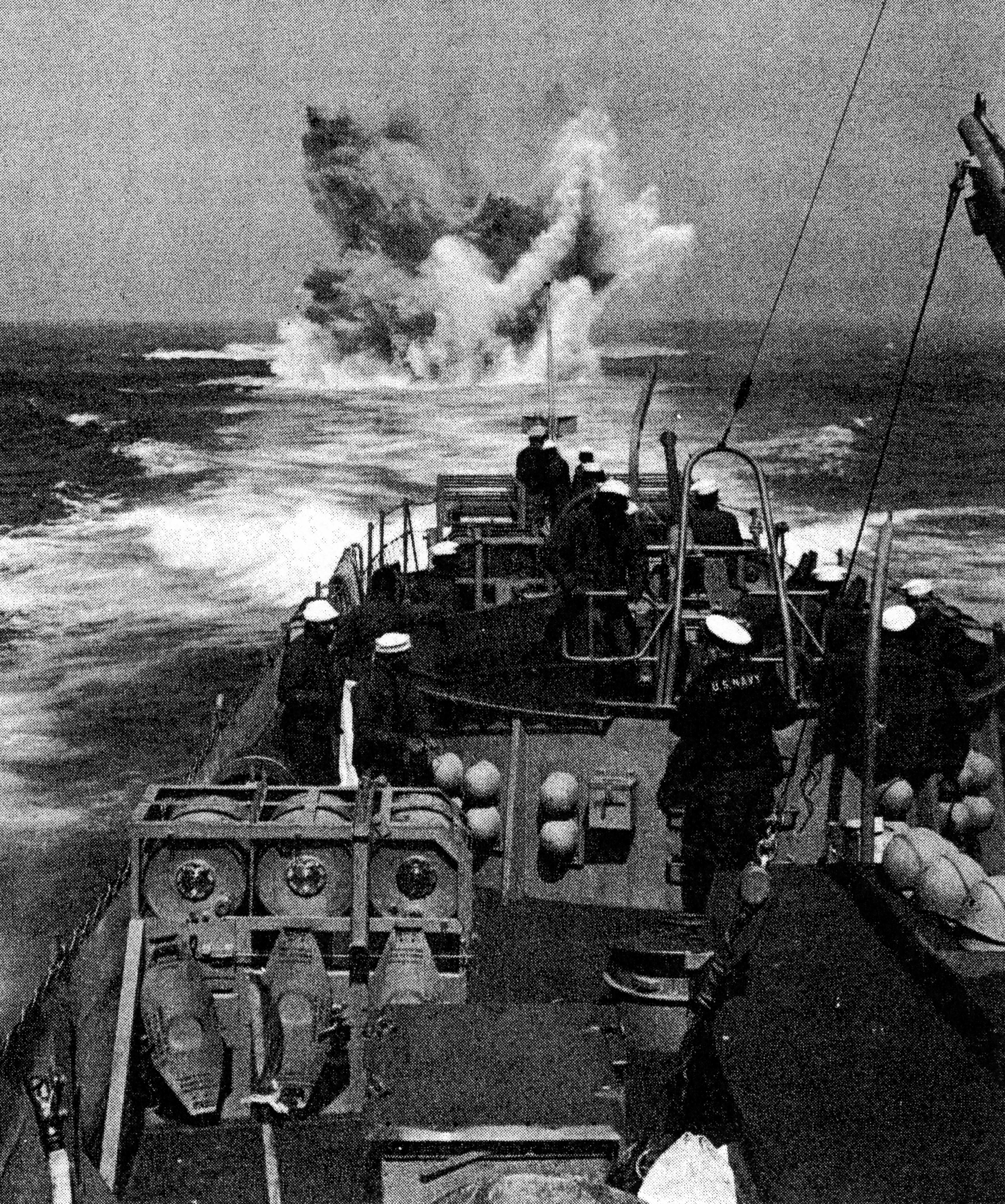
A depth charge explodes astern during a practice anti-submarine run during the ship's shakedown tests.

On 2 July 1944, the ship's shakedown cruise and post-inspection was completed. PC-1264 was then ordered to a three and a half-days' exercise at the Fleet Sound School in Key West. However, as far as the Submarine Chaser Training Center was concerned, PC-1264 was ready. Fifteen members of the crew also received the ship's first promotions.

=== Escort duty ===
After completing Fleet Sound School, PC-1264 returned to New York and reported for duty on 10 July 1944. She was assigned to Task Unit 02.9, a surface escort group based at the Naval Frontier Base, Staten Island. In the months ahead, PC-1264 would escort convoys from New York to Cuba or Key West and back again, or from Charleston, South Carolina to New York. She escorted the French submarine Argo from New York to Key West so that U.S. air and sea anti-submarine forces would not confuse Argo with a German submarine. PC-1264 would also serve in the role of an "enemy destroyer" to provide submarines with anti-escort training, which also gave additional anti-submarine training to PC-1264's crew.

Its first convoy duty was Convoy NG-448, from New York to Guantanamo Bay, Cuba. On 21 July sonar indicated a large unidentified object nearby and, acting on standard anti-submarine procedures, PC-1264 engaged the contact for three hours before leaving to rejoin the convoy, which was now safely out of range. Afterwards, she regularly escorted convoys from New York to Key West and back again.

In September 1944, the engineering section discovered a series of cracks between the engine mounts and bedplates (girders supporting the engines) that were welded to the ship's hull. These bedplates distributed the engine's weight along the 1/2-inch-thick (13 mm) hull. Base engineering confirmed that poor welding during construction was responsible for the cracks. The base engineer also stated that a heavy sea could shift the engines off their supports and sink the ship. As a result, PC-1264 was relieved from duty and towed to the Navy Yard Annex, at Bayonne, New Jersey. This may have saved the lives of the crew, as the convoy they were preparing to escort later encountered a hurricane with heavy seas. In all probability, PC-1264 would have been lost.

After the ship was repaired and passed sea trials, PC-1264 reported again to its Tompkinsville base. It was there, during the first week of November, that the eight white Petty Officers received orders detaching them from PC-1264, and their places were taken by eight, newly promoted, black Petty Officers.

=== Independent anti-submarine duty ===
In early January 1945, as PC-1264 and other escort ships were sailing with a convoy to Key West, the command vessel received a radio message from Eastern Sea Frontier headquarters detaching three of the ships, including PC-1264, and ordering their return to New York. While PC-1264 would escort one more convoy during the war, her primary mission now was anti-submarine duty. The capture of German spies landed by U-1230 during November 1944, and the statement by one of the spies that the Germans were preparing to launch V-1 and V-2 rockets by submarines against major U.S. ports, forced the U.S. Navy to respond by increasing its active anti-submarine forces. PC-1264 was part of that increase and began patrolling areas from Long Island south to Cape Charles, the entrance to the Chesapeake Bay.

On 17 January, PC-1264 unloaded her ammunition, then proceeded to the Luders Marine Construction Company in Stamford, Connecticut, to have her bottom cleaned and receive a new coat of paint on her underwater hull. She arrived on 18 January and was in drydock for three days. For the next three months, PC-1264 patrolled a line running north by east for 20 miles (32 km) from Buoy "Able," the farthest seaward buoy marking the mine-swept channel into New York, 45 miles (72 km) away. Despite the monotony and the winter weather, the duty was pleasant, as PC-1264 spent seven days at sea and then five days in port.

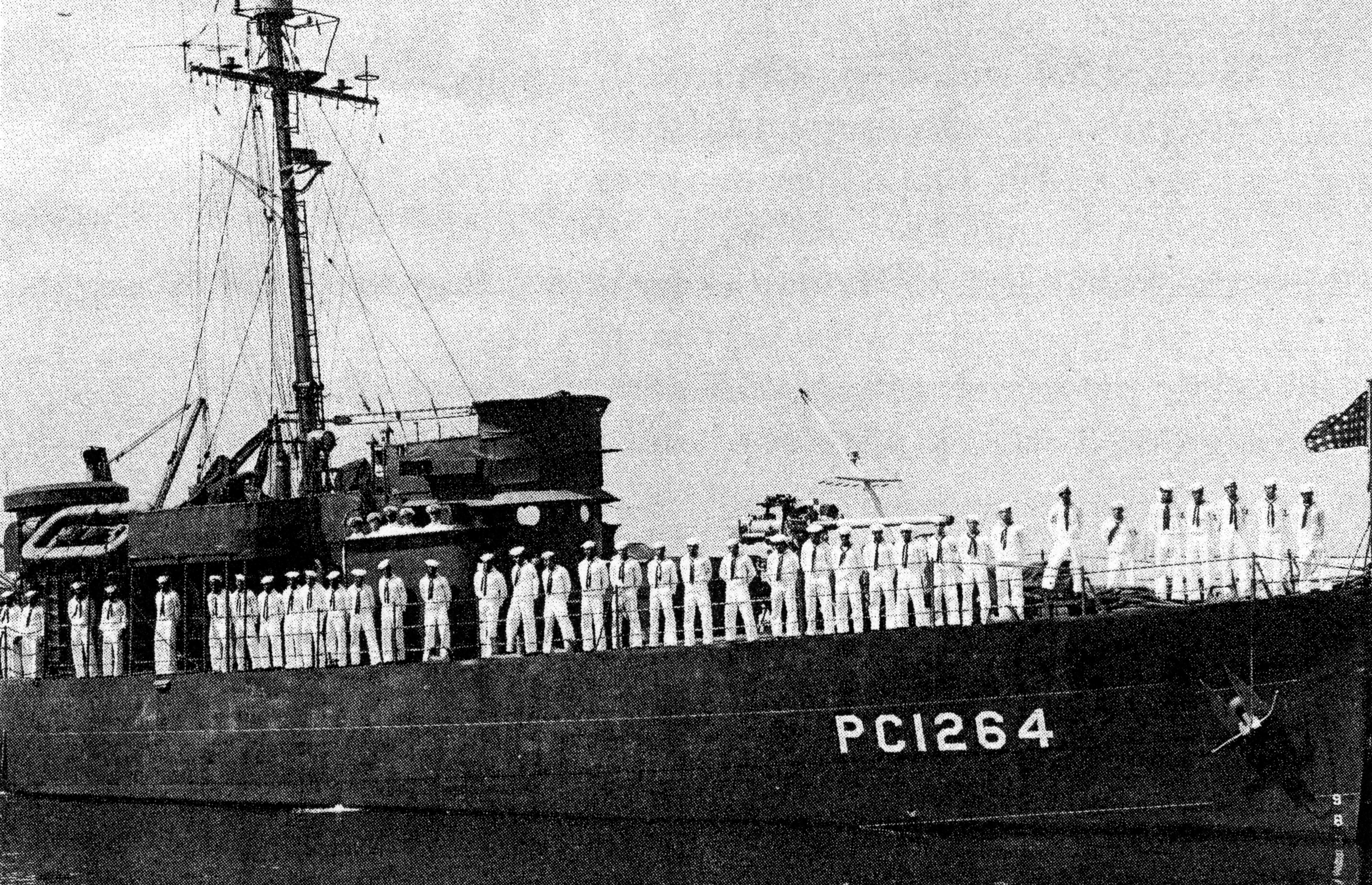
Officers and crew line the rails while in port.

On 28 February, while engaged in a practice "anti-submarine' run against Buoy Able, PC-1264 may have flushed a German submarine that was using Buoy Able as cover against sonar from patrolling vessels. As the ship neared the end of the practice run against the buoy, the sonar operator reported "Target bearing left rapidly." Lt. Purdon quickly realized what had probably happened and PC-1264 actively engaged the target with Mark 22 Antisubmarine Projectiles. This continued for several hours, and, at one point, two crewmen claimed to have seen a submarine conning tower rise briefly then sink back into the turbulence. Eventually the signal disappeared. While Eastern Sea Frontier headquarters believed that the ship had engaged a false signal, the crew always believed that they had flushed U-866, a damaged submarine sunk two weeks later off Sable Island, east of Nova Scotia.

On 23 April, PC-1264 left Tompkinsville on her last patrol. On 25 April, while at sea, the ship received new orders. PC-1264 was ordered to proceed to Charleston, South Carolina and assume command of the escort ships for Convoy KN-382. Although PC-1264 had participated in escorting many convoys, this was the first time she was to be in command of the escort group. This was an indication of the confidence Eastern Sea Frontier headquarters now had in PC-1264. On 27 April, PC-1264, accompanied by PC-1149 and PC-1547, led 30 merchant ships out of Charleston harbor. The convoy was to sail eastward to rendezvous with a smaller convoy heading north from Key West. The next morning, the 30-ship convoy met the northbound convoy of nine merchantmen escorted by three frigates and three subchasers. USS Natchez was in command of this convoy and PC-1264 reported in, turned over command of the 30 merchantmen, and assumed position on the starboard beam of the joining convoys. With the arrival of the three subchasers from Charleston, two of the smaller subchasers were detached for other duties. The next afternoon, two of the frigates also left.

On 29 April, the convoy encountered U-879, which was attacked by USS Natchez. The convoy and the other escorts, including PC-1264, continued on course with USS Natchez to deal with U-879. Later that night the convoy encountered Task Group 02.10, a Hunter-Killer Group, which passed down the port side of the convoy on its way assist USS Natchez. Two of the destroyer escorts in this group participated in the sinking of U-879, one of the last anti-submarine actions of the war in the Atlantic.

=== Battle of the Atlantic ends ===
Convoy NK-686 started from New York with 28 cargo ships and tankers with PC-1264 as one of the convoy's five escort ships. While the war in Europe had officially ended the day before, the Commander of Eastern Sea Frontier was not taking any chances that individual German submarines might continue the battle. As the convoy headed south toward Key West, 15 ships joined when it passed the Chesapeake Bay, while others left it for the ports of Charleston, Savannah and Jacksonville. Then, on 15 May, Eastern Sea Frontier headquarters was convinced the danger was over, and the merchantmen were dispersed to head for their destinations alone. The escort ships, Task Unit 02.9.10, were ordered to Key West for a week's training before returning to New York. On the return trip to Tompkinsville, New York, where Task Unit 02.9.10 arrived on 25 May, the crews' concern was where they were headed next, as there was still a war in the Pacific.

As PC-1264 remained in a crowded anchorage filled with numerous other escort vessels, the crew watched as many other submarine chasers had their K-guns, that fired the 300-pound (140 kg) depth charges, removed and their 20 mm guns replaced by twin-barreled guns of the same caliber. These ships were headed for the Pacific where men-of-war needed heavy anti-aircraft defenses against Japanese suicide planes. Finally the word came down:

From Chief of Naval Operations. To USS PC1264. When in all respects ready for sea, and when directed by Commander Eastern Sea Frontier, you will proceed to Norfolk, Virginia, and report to Commander-in-Chief, Atlantic Fleet, for training. Upon completion of refresher training, you will proceed via Canal Zone and report to Commander-in-Chief, Pacific Fleet.

PC-1264 soon had her K-guns removed from the afterdeck, and on 31 July she left for Norfolk. After an inspection by base personnel, PC-1264 left for Miami and arrived at the Submarine Chaser Training Center on 5 August. PC-1264 was due to remain at the center for ten days training, but an incident cut that time short.

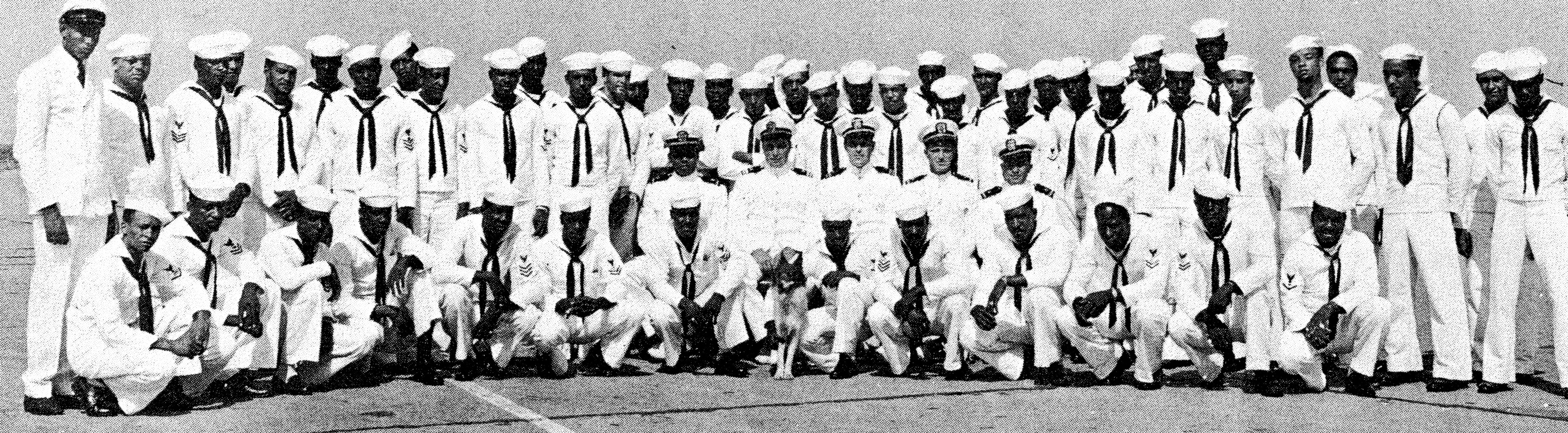
Officers, crew and mascot pose for a photograph.

One night, at a club that served African Americans, a small fight resulted in the club owner calling the Shore Patrol. When the three white members of the Shore Patrol arrived—a Navy Chief, another enlisted sailor, and an army MP—the chief stayed with the vehicle while the other two entered the club. There, they spotted a black sailor in an officer's uniform. Since impersonating an officer is a Federal offense, the MP went over to that man. The man suspected of "impersonating an officer" was actually Ensign Sam Gravely. When the MP told Ensign Gravely that the chief wanted to see him, Gravely replied, "If the Chief wants to see me, tell him to come here."—following correct naval protocol for an enlisted man to come to an officer. The MP then grabbed Ensign Gravely out of his chair. "Take it easy," Ensign Gravely shouted to the other men in the club who were visibly upset; then added, "This is only a mistake." Then to the MP, he said, "Let's go." However, the word spread quickly that Ensign Gravely was being arrested. Black sailors converged on the MP and the Shore Patrol chief radioed for reinforcements. Two more Shore Patrol vehicles with more men soon arrived, to find Ensign Gravely trying to calm the men and explain the mistake to the Shore Patrol. However, Shore Patrol personnel in the two vehicles quickly emerged and forced a number of PC-1264's crew into the trucks. Ensign Gravely got into the chief's vehicle, and all proceeded to Shore Patrol Headquarters.

One of PC-1264's crew ran for the ship to tell the captain what had happened. When Lieutenant Purdon arrived at Shore Patrol headquarters he found the Shore Patrol officer on duty apologizing to Ensign Gravely as the Ensign had explained the MP's mistake. However, the men who had moved against the Shore Patrol, seeking to defend Ensign Gravely, were charged with "Refusal to Obey Orders of Shore Patrol," "Interference with Shore Patrol," two charges of "Drunk and Disorderly," and one charge of "Drunk." The next morning at base headquarters, Lieutenant Purdon was informed that the admiral commanding the naval district wanted Lieutenant Purdon to "institute general count martial proceedings against that ensign for 'conduct unbecoming an officer and a gentleman'". Lieutenant Purdon, as the commanding officer of PC-1264, refused, citing Navy Regulations that a commandant of a naval district could not order a ship's captain to bring charges against any officer under that ship captain's command. The base adjutant, hearing and understanding the facts behind the incident, advised Lieutenant Purdon to restrict his men to the ship and, therefore, out of reach of the Shore Patrol and the admiral, which Lieutenant Purdon did. PC-1264 spent four more days in training and left Miami for Key West.

=== End of the war ===
Key West was as far west as PC-1264 ever sailed. The day after her arrival, President Truman announced that an atomic bomb had been dropped on Japan. With her orders canceled, PC-1264 waited at Key West for three weeks. Eventually, the Bureau of Naval Personnel issued plans for demobilization. Lieutenant Purdon requested to be released from active duty and recommended that Lieutenant (jg) Ernest Hardmann, his executive officer, be given command. On 5 September, orders arrived for PC-1264 to proceed to Norfolk, where Lieutenant Purdon would turn over command to Lt. Hardmann. PC-1264 arrived at Norfolk on 10 September, and the change of command ceremony took place on 17 September. Before this ceremony, members of the crews already were being released from active duty or transferred to other stations. Also, the crew presented Lieutenant Purdon with a desk lamp with the inscription "USS PC 1264 We Will Never Fail." Afterwards, the ship stayed at Norfolk for six more weeks, then moved to the Norfolk Naval Shipyard, just up the Elizabeth River.

In early October, PC-1264 was honored by being selected as one of forty-seven representative warships for a review of the fleet by President Truman on Navy Day, 27 October. On 24 October, she sailed from Norfolk to New York, where the review was to be held. Soon after PC-1264 left Norfolk, her new commanding officer, Lieutenant (jg) Jack Sutherland, arrived—after traveling there from New York. He was sent back to New York and arrived there soon after his new command. However, he would not take command until after Navy Day. PC-1264, as the smallest vessel, was at the tail end of the Fleet review. However, President Truman, on board the destroyer USS Renshaw, circled PC-1264 and waved to the crew.

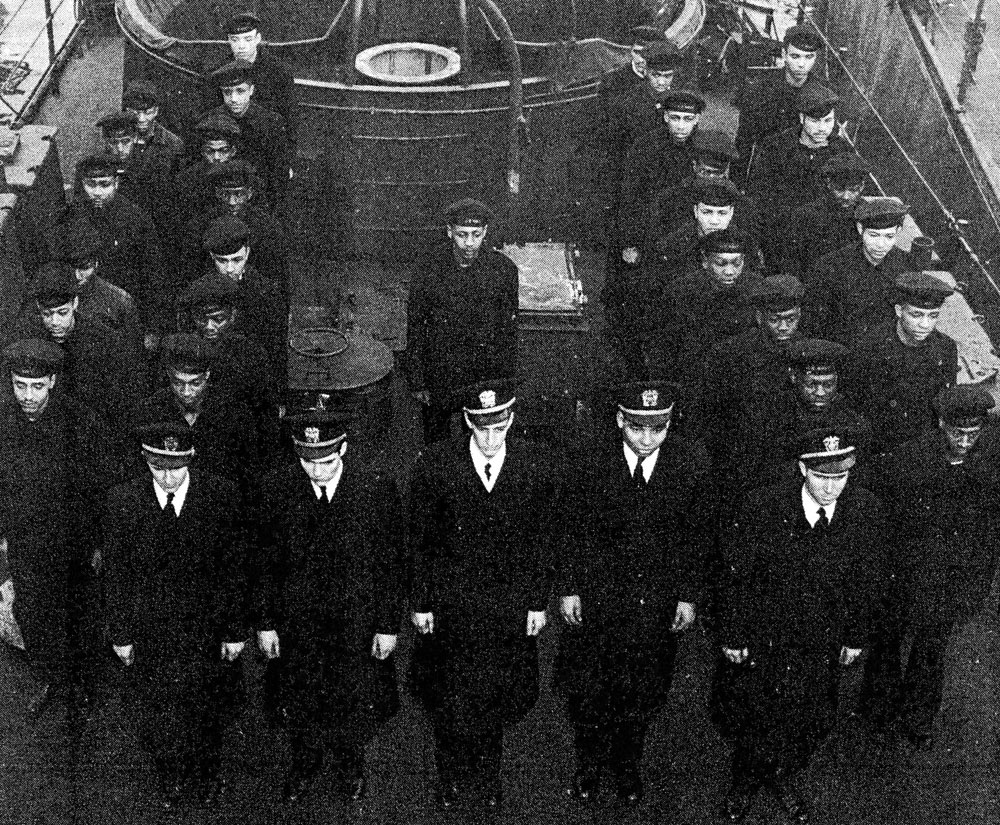
Officers and enlisted men of PC-1264 at its decommissioning.

Both before and after the fleet review, PC-1264 held "open house" for families and friends of the crew and other interested persons, especially from the African-American community which had great pride in the ship's accomplishments. On 31 October, Lieutenant (jg) Sutherland assumed command. On 4 November, the ship sailed for New London, Connecticut, where it spent all of November and half of December assisting in the training of submarine officers, as a target ship for them to practice submarine runs on. On 15 December, PC-1264 returned to Tompkinsville for Christmas leave. While on leave, Ensign Ben Shanker, the executive officer, received orders to the Pacific and did not return to the ship. When the crew returned, Ensign Sam Gravely was the new executive officer. Soon after, PC-1264 returned to New London for its submarine training duty. However, PC-1264 then received orders to return to New York "for disposal." On 7 February 1946, five officers and twenty-eight enlisted men stood at attention as PC-1264 was officially decommissioned.

The war records of the submarine chaser PC-1264 and the destroyer escort USS Mason considerably contributed to opening up billets for African Americans in the post-war navy. As a final honor for PC-1264, the officer-in-charge of the final inspection party remarked, "This ship has done a better job of decommissioning—is in better shape—than any other ship, at least, here in New York." Because of her condition, PC-1264 became the subchaser used as a showcase for prospective civilian purchasers.

== After the war ==
After PC-1264 was decommissioned, she was transferred to the United States Maritime Commission for final disposition. As of February 2008, she was extant—albeit in poor repair—at the former Donjon Marine Yard in New York. Two 1990-era photographs show her heavily rusted, but still afloat amid other hulks.

Like many officers, Lieutenant Purdon left the U.S. Navy after the war but remained in the Naval Reserve. He worked as an intelligence analyst for the Central Intelligence Group until 1948, when he was recalled to active duty. He retired in 1963 with the rank of commander. Eric Purdon then held civilian jobs with the Commerce Department, Office of Economic Opportunity and the Job Corps, and was also an author. He died in 1989.
