= USS Mason (DDG-87) =

American guided missile destroyer

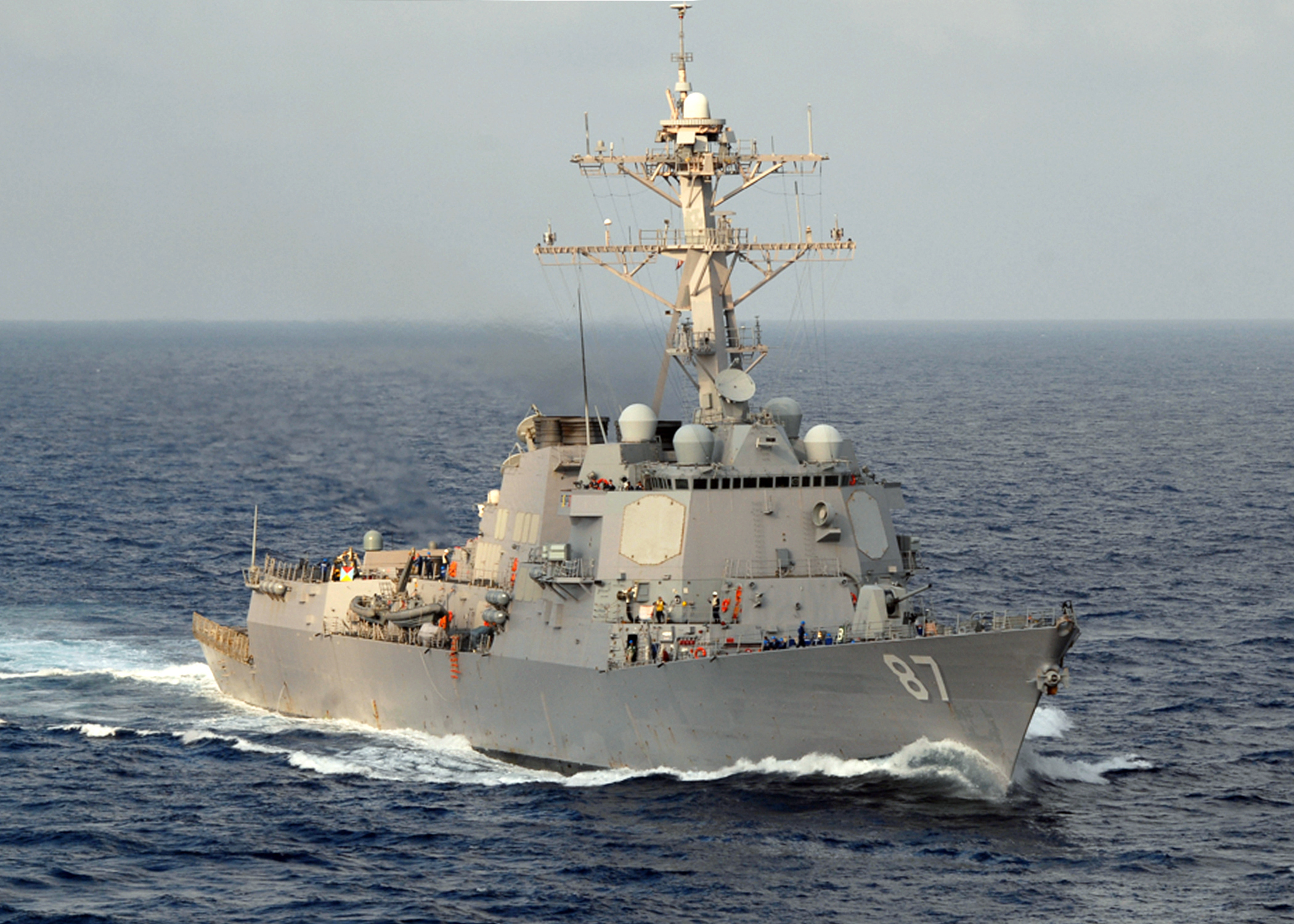
- USS Mason on 29 July 2008

History

United States
- Name: Mason
- Namesake: Newton Henry Mason
- Ordered: 13 December 1996
- Builder: Bath Iron Works
- Laid down: 19 January 2000
- Launched: 23 June 2001
- Commissioned: 12 April 2003
- Home port: Mayport
- Identification: MMSI number: 369918000; Callsign: NPWS; Hull number: DDG-87
- Motto: Proudly We Serve
- Status: in active service
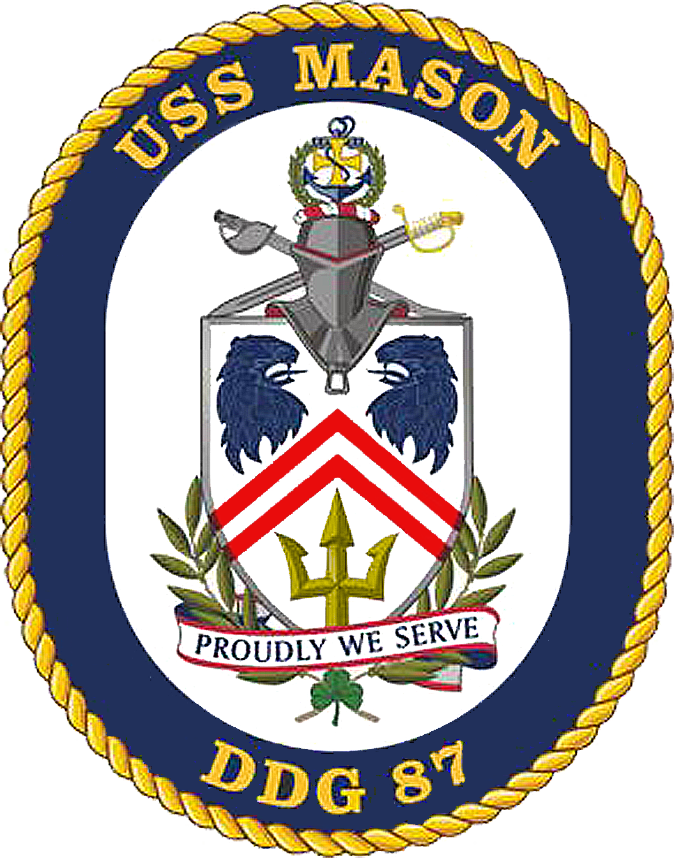
- Badge

General characteristics
- Class & type: Arleigh Burke-class guided missile destroyer
- Displacement: 9,200 tons
- Length: 509 ft 6 in (155.30 m)
- Beam: 66 ft (20 m)
- Draft: 31 ft (9.4 m)
- Propulsion: 4 × General Electric LM2500-30 gas turbines, 2 shafts, 100,000 shp (75,000 kW)
- Speed: exceeds 30 knots (56 km/h; 35 mph)
- Complement: 380 officers and enlisted
- Armament: Guns: 1 × 5-inch (127 mm)/62 Mk 45 Mod 4 (lightweight gun); 1 × 20 mm (0.8 in) Phalanx CIWS; 2 × 25 mm (0.98 in) Mk 38 machine gun system; 4 × 0.50 in (12.7 mm) caliber guns; Missiles: 1 × 32-cell, 1 × 64-cell (96 total cells) Mk 41 vertical launching system (VLS): RIM-66M surface-to-air missile; RIM-156 surface-to-air missile; RIM-174A Standard ERAM; RIM-161 anti-ballistic missile; RIM-162 ESSM (quad-packed); BGM-109 Tomahawk cruise missile; RUM-139 vertical launch ASROC; Torpedoes: 2 × Mark 32 triple torpedo tubes: Mark 46 lightweight torpedo; Mark 50 lightweight torpedo; Mark 54 lightweight torpedo
- Aircraft carried: 2 × MH-60R Seahawk helicopters

USS Mason (DDG-87) is an Arleigh Burke-class (Flight IIA) Aegis guided-missile destroyer in the United States Navy. She is named in honor of the black crewmembers who served on board USS Mason (DE-529) during the period of racial segregation in the United States Armed Forces.

Mason was the 21st ship of this class to be built at Bath Iron Works in Bath, Maine, and construction began on 19 January 2000. She was launched and christened on 23 June 2001. On 12 April 2003, a commissioning ceremony was held at Port Canaveral, Florida. She is currently homeported at the Naval Station Mayport in Mayport, Florida.

== Etymology ==
This is the third U.S. Navy warship with the name USS Mason. The first Mason (DD-191), in service from 1920 to 1941, was named for John Young Mason, well known for his service as the secretary of the navy for two American Presidents. The second Mason (DE-529) was named for Ensign Newton Henry Mason, a naval aviator who posthumously was awarded the Distinguished Flying Cross. This ship is named for the crew of the second Mason (DE-529), as this was the first ship in the US Navy with the distinction of having a predominantly black crew.

== Service history ==
=== 2004–2015 ===
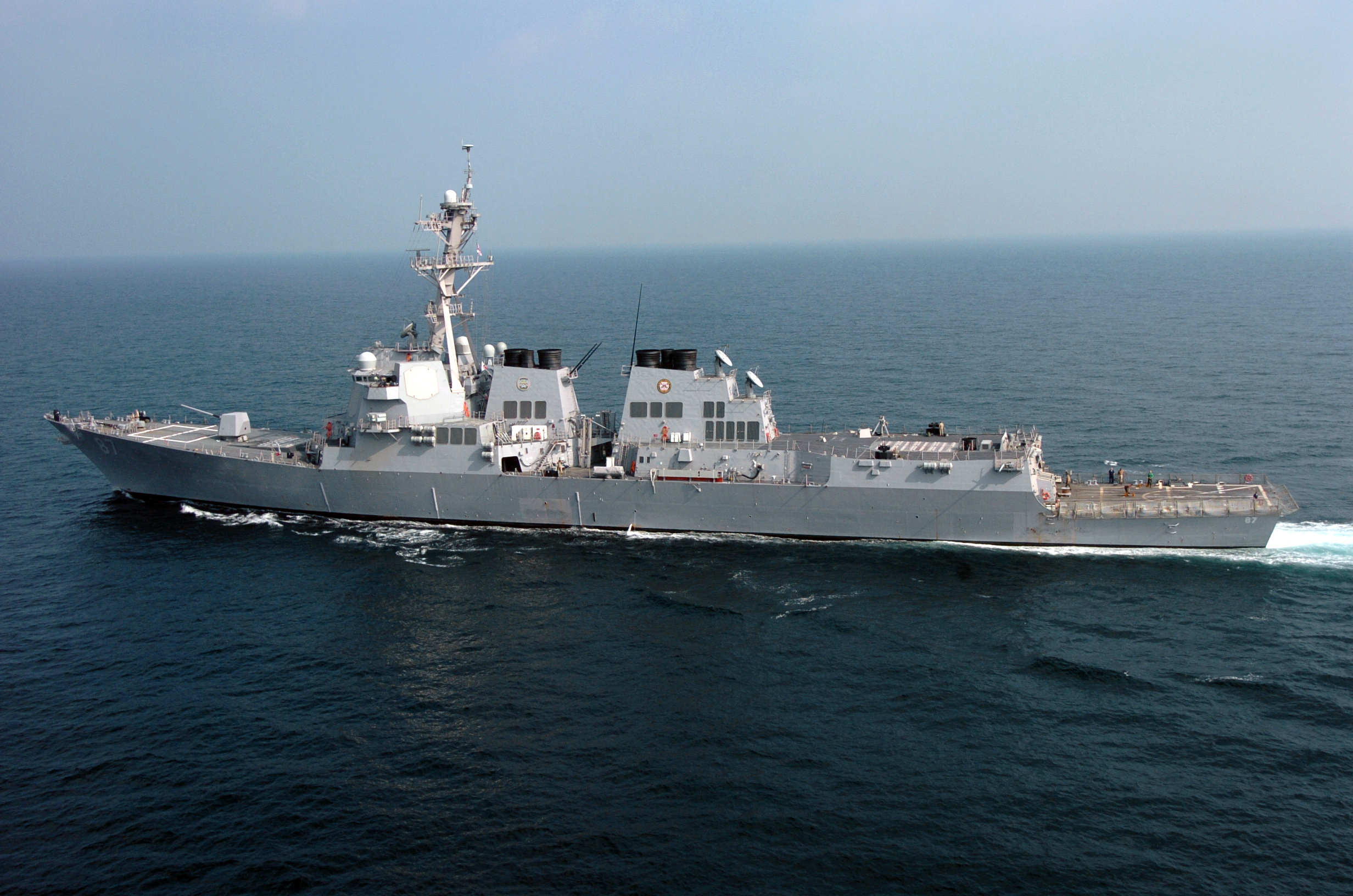
Mason in the Persian Gulf, January 2005

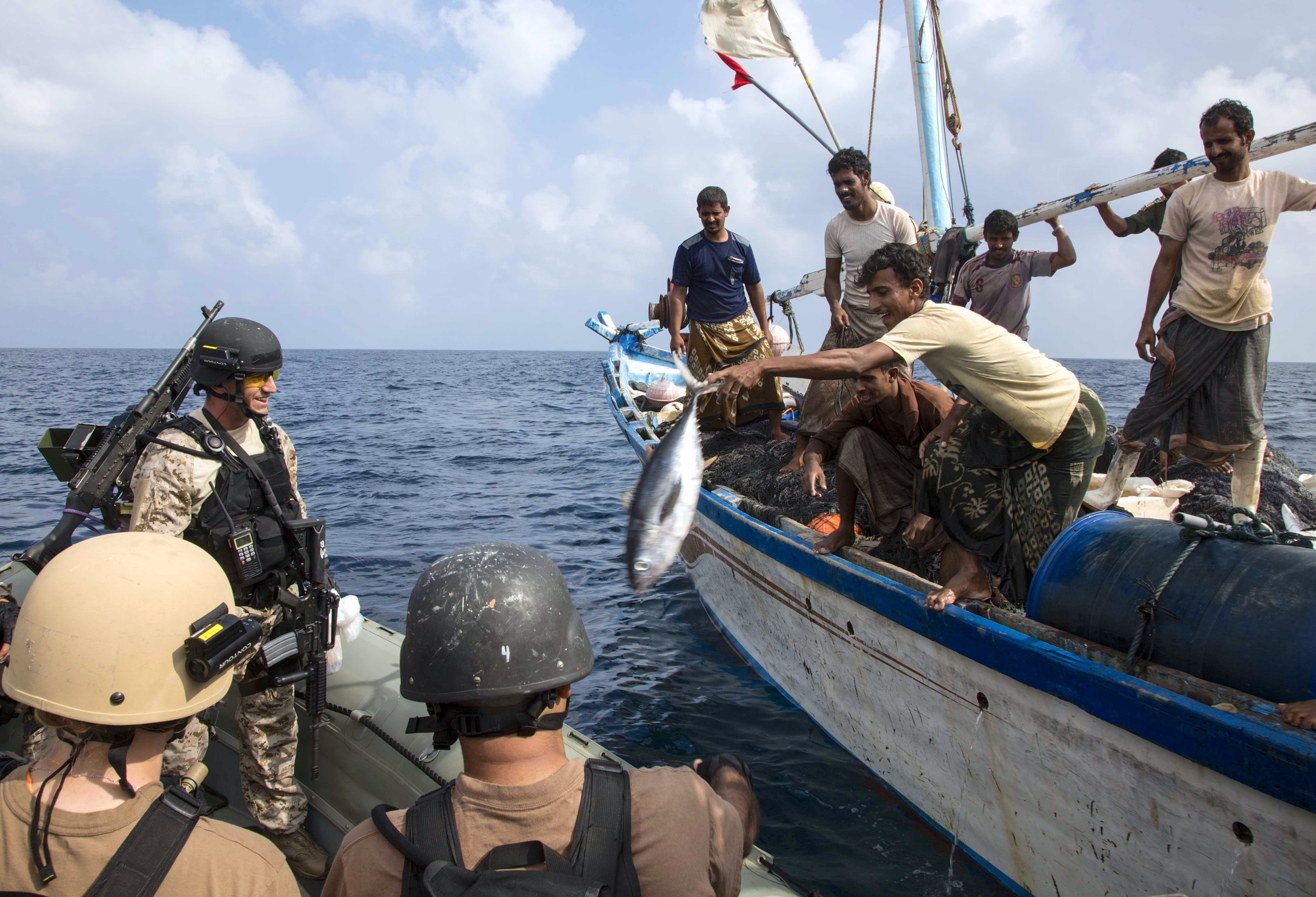
The visit, board, search and seizure (VBSS) team receive a fish from a Yemeni fisherman

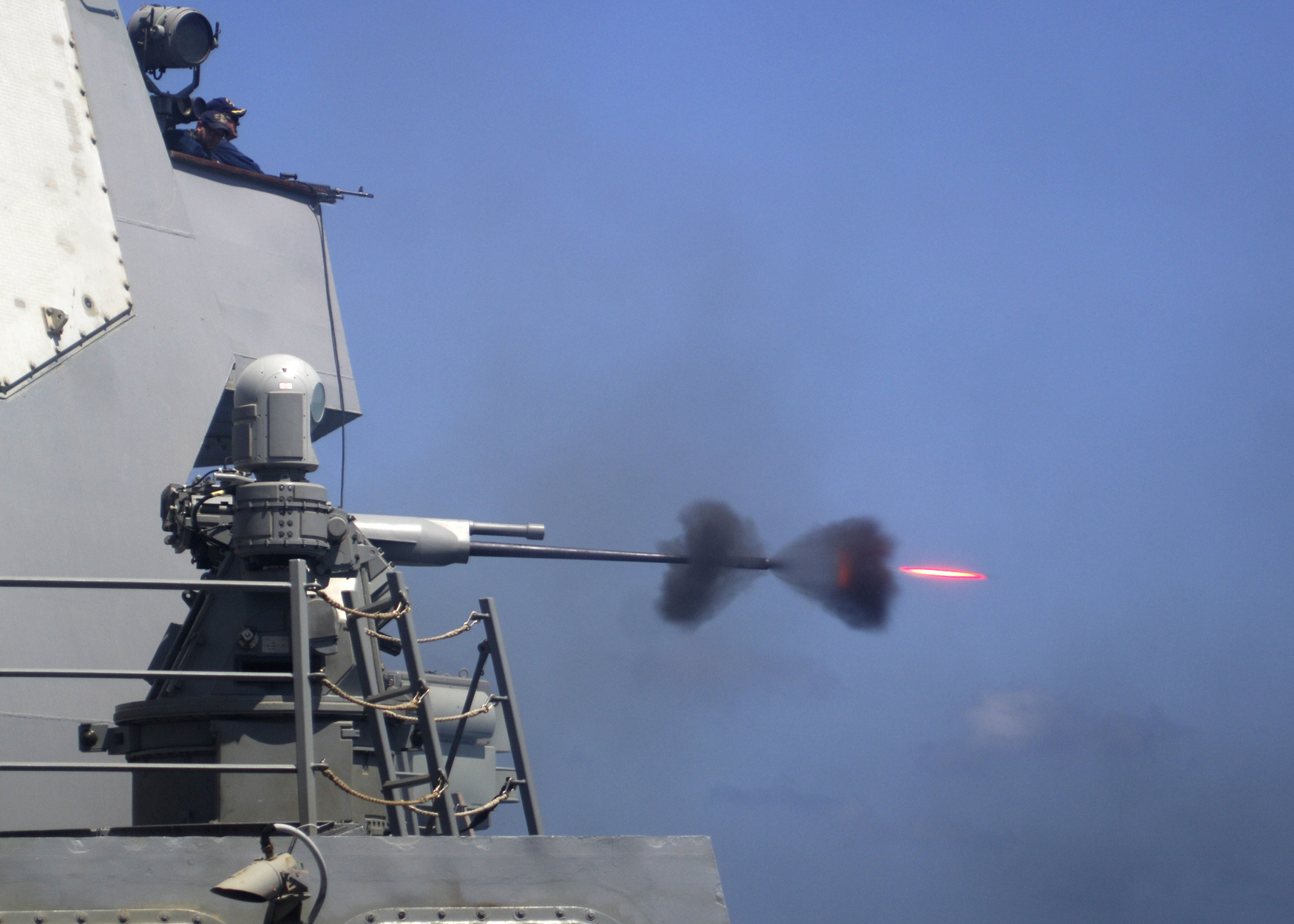
An MK-38 25 mm gun system is fired during a live-fire exercise

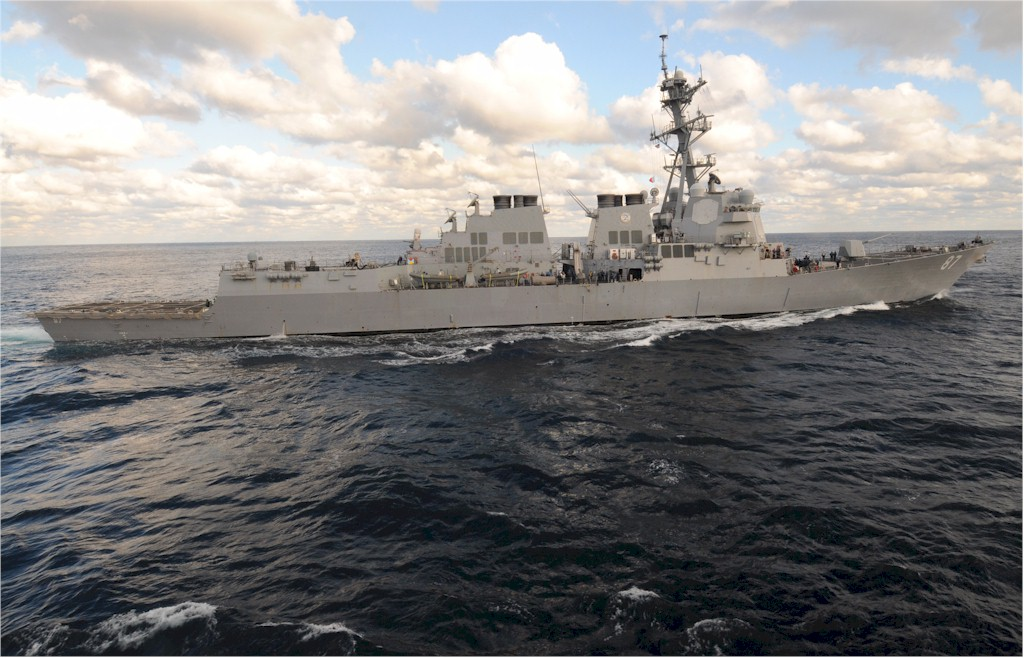
Mason in the Atlantic, 2011

USS Mason conducted her maiden deployment with the USS Harry S. Truman Carrier Strike Group in support of Operation Iraqi Freedom/Operation Enduring Freedom in late 2004. Mason returned home after six months on 18 April 2005.

On 3 October 2006, Mason departed Naval Station Norfolk for a seven-month deployment to the Persian Gulf in support of the global war on terrorism. She participated in Exercise Neon Falcon. Mason returned home in May 2007.

Mason deployed with the aircraft carrier USS Theodore Roosevelt on 12 September 2008 for a scheduled deployment. Mason made scheduled port calls in 2008-2009 to ports in Mykonos, Nice, Aqaba, Istanbul, Dubai, Bahrain, and Jebel Ali. Mason conducted operations in the Persian Gulf in support of operation enduring freedom.

On 12 March 2011, she sailed through the Suez Canal en route to the Mediterranean, to support possible humanitarian or military action in response to the Libyan Civil War. In April 2011, a boarding team from the ship successfully liberated five Yemeni hostages from 11 Somali pirates who had taken over the Yemeni-flagged ship F/V Nasri. The pirates had seriously injured two other fishermen in their attack, left the wounded ashore, and then taken Nasri to sea as a pirate mothership. Assault weapons, ammunition, rocket propelled grenades, and launchers were destroyed by the boarding team.

On 22 July 2013, she deployed to the Fifth Fleet and Sixth Fleet area of responsibility as part of the Harry S. Truman Carrier Strike Group. Mason returned to her homeport on 18 April 2014.

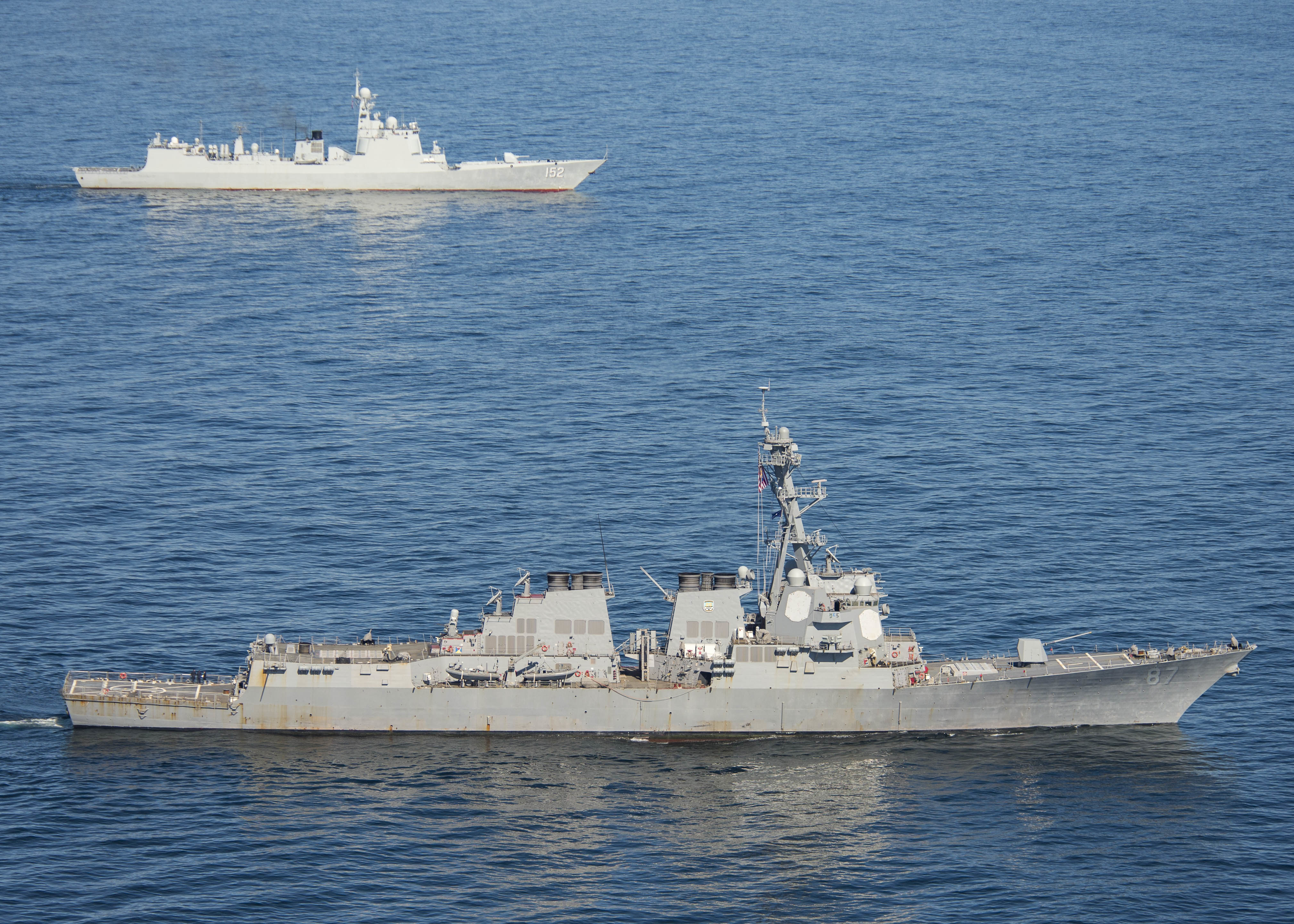
Mason with Chinese destroyer Jinan, 6 November 2015

On 7 November 2015, Mason, acting as the flagship for Destroyer Squadron 26, completed the first East Coast Passing Exercise with the People's Republic of China's People's Liberation Army-Navy ships.

=== 2016 attacks off the coast of Yemen ===
On 3 October 2016, following a guided-missile attack by Houthi rebels on the United Arab Emirates-operated HSV-2 Swift, Mason was deployed off the coast of war-torn Yemen, along with destroyers USS Nitze and USS Roosevelt, and USS Ponce, an amphibious transport dock being used as a forward landing base and laser test bed. According to an unnamed U.S. Department of Defense official, the purpose for sending the ships was "to ensure that shipping continues unimpeded in the strait and the vicinity."

On 9 October 2016, Mason, operating near the Bab-el-Mandeb strait, was targeted by two missiles fired from Houthi-controlled territory. Both missiles fell short and crashed into the water. The Houthi insurgency denied launching the attack on the warship. The United States Naval Institute reported that Mason fired two SM-2 Standard missiles and one RIM-162 ESSM missile to intercept the two missiles, and deployed her Nulka missile decoy. One of two U.S. defense officials cited anonymously added that whether the incoming missiles had been shot down or crashed into the water on their own was not clear . This marked the first recorded instance of ship-based anti-air missiles being fired from vertical launching cells in combat in response to an actual inbound missile threat.

On 12 October 2016 Mason was again targeted by missiles fired from Yemeni territory, while she was operating in the Bab el-Mandeb strait. Mason was not hit by the two missiles, which were fired from near the southern Yemen city of Al Hudaydah. While the Navy was not certain whether the first incoming missile was intercepted or instead just fell into the sea, officials said Mason successfully intercepted the second missile at a distance around 8 miles (13 km), marking the first time in history a warship destroyed an inbound antiship missile with a Surface-to-air missile in actual self-defense. On 13 October 2016, the U.S. attacked three radar sites in Houthi-held territory, which had been involved in the earlier missile attacks, with cruise missiles launched from Nitze. The Pentagon assessed that all three sites were destroyed.

On 15 October 2016, Mason was targeted in a third attack by Houthi rebels based in Yemen, by five antiship cruise missiles while operating in the Red Sea north of the Bab el-Mandeb strait. Mason fired a radar decoy, an infrared decoy, and several SM-2 Standard missiles in response, either neutralizing or intercepting four of the five incoming missiles. The Navy reported the fifth incoming missile was neutralized by a radar decoy launched from Nitze, after Mason alerted her to the threat.

=== 2017–2022 ===
On 23 May 2017, Mason was awarded the 2016 Battenberg Cup, signifying she was the best all-around ship or submarine in the United States Navy's Atlantic Fleet based on crew achievements. Mason was only the fifth destroyer in the prior 111 years to receive the award.

On 22 August 2022, Mason completed a homeport shift to Naval Station Mayport, in Jacksonville, Florida.

=== Gaza war ===
On 14 October 2023, US Secretary of Defense Lloyd Austin directed nuclear-powered aircraft carrier Dwight D. Eisenhower and her carrier strike group, which includes the cruiser Philippine Sea, along with Mason and sister destroyers Laboon and Gravely, to the eastern Mediterranean in response to the Gaza war. This is the second carrier strike group to be sent to the region in response to the conflict, following aircraft carrier Gerald R. Ford and her group, which had been dispatched six days earlier.

On 26 November 2023, Mason responded to a distress call from the commercial tanker Central Park, which was seized by gunmen in the Gulf of Aden. Five gunmen tried to escape on a fast boat, but were chased and eventually surrendered to a search-and-seizure team dispatched by Mason. Two ballistic missiles were fired from Houthi-controlled parts of Yemen towards the general direction of Mason and Central Park, but they landed about 10 nautical miles away from the ships, with no reported injuries or damage.

On 6 December 2023, Mason shot down an air drone headed toward Mason from Yemen, which officials attributed to Houthi rebels, as it was in the southern Red Sea.

After the Norwegian-flagged oil and chemical tanker Strinda, traveling from Malaysia and carrying a cargo of palm oil, was struck by an antiship cruise missile while passing through the Bab-el-Mandeb strait on 11 December 2023, Mason responded to the ship's distress call and rendered assistance.

On 13 December 2023, Mason shot down in self-defense a drone launched from a Houthi-controlled area of Yemen, which was heading directly towards Mason. Mason was at the time responding to the distress call issued by the tanker Ardmore Encounter. Houthi forces had unsuccessfully attempted to board the tanker on skiffs, exchanged fire with the ship’s armed guards, and then fired two missiles in the Ardmore Encounter's direction, prompting the distress call. The tanker was carrying jet fuel from India to the Netherlands and Sweden.

=== United States–Houthi conflict (2023–present) ===
On 12 January 2024, Philippine Sea, Mason, and Gravely fired Tomahawk cruise missiles at Iranian-backed Houthi rebels in Yemen. Aircraft from Carrier Air Wing Three, embarked on the carrier Dwight D. Eisenhower, also participated in the strikes.

=== 2026 Iran war ===
On 4 May 2026, American forces reportedly destroyed six or seven small Iranian boats in the Strait of Hormuz in a clash during the Operation Project Freedom as part of the 2026 Iran war. The boats were destroyed after they allegedly tried to interfere with the transit of two US-flagged commercial vessels and USS Truxtun and USS Mason.

== Coat of arms ==
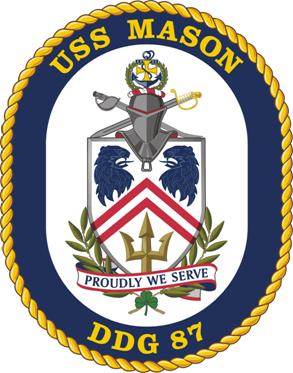
Crest

The shield has background of white with a double chevron across the center. Above are opposing lions and below is a gold trident. The traditional U.S. Navy colors were chosen for the shield because dark blue and gold represents the sea and excellence, respectively. The colors red, white, and blue represent the United States. The double chevron is to honor DD 191 and DE 529, the former ships named USS Mason. The facing lions, adapted from the Mason family coat of arms, denote the Atlantic and Pacific campaigns of World War II. The trident, symbol of sea prowess, represents Mason's modern warfare capabilities, which include the AEGIS weapon system (including Aegis Ballistic Missile Defense System from theater ballistic missiles) and Cooperative Engagement Capability.

The crest consists of a helm, crossing swords behind, and a combined anchor and cross surrounded by a wreath. The helm is symbolic to strong defense with power projection. The anchor refers to the namesake of DD 191, John Y. Mason, who was the Secretary of the Navy under Presidents John Tyler and James K. Polk. The cross is in reference to Newton Henry Mason's Distinguished Flying Cross award. The wreath represents all the awards, honors, and achievements of the past ships with the namesake Mason and crews who served them.

The motto is written on a scroll of white with a red trim. The ship's motto is "Proudly We Serve". The motto is in honor of the high achievement of the African-American crew of DE-529 who made history with their selfless bravery in defense of the U.S. in World War II, and marks their contribution to the eventual desegregation of the U.S. Navy.

The coat of arms in full color as in the blazon, upon a white background enclosed within a dark blue oval border edged on the outside with a gold rope and bearing the inscription "USS Mason" at the top and "DDG 87" in the base, all gold.

== Awards ==
- Combat Action Ribbon - (9-15 Oct 2016, Oct 2023 - Apr 2024)
- Navy Unit Commendation - (Oct 2006-May 2007, Sep 2008-Apr 2009, Oct 2023-May 2024)
- Navy Meritorious Unit Commendation - (Jan 2011-Nov 2012)
- Navy E Ribbon - (2004, 2005, 2016, 2023)
- Navy Expeditionary Medal - (Sep-Nov 2013)
- Battenberg Cup - (2016)
- LANTFLT Anti-Submarine Warfare (ASW) Bloodhound Award - 2015, 2019
