= USS Mason (DE-529) =

1943 Evarts-class destroyer escort

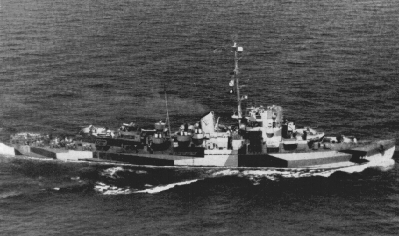
- USS Mason with dazzle camouflage

History

United States
- Name: Mason
- Laid down: 14 October 1943
- Launched: 17 November 1943
- Commissioned: 20 March 1944
- Decommissioned: 12 October 1945
- Stricken: 1 November 1945
- Fate: Sold for scrap 1947

General characteristics
- Class & type: Evarts-class destroyer escort
- Displacement: 1,140 short tons (1,030 tonnes)
- Length: 289 ft 5 in (88.21 m)
- Beam: 35 ft 1 in (10.69 m)
- Draft: 8 ft 3 in (2.51 m)
- Speed: 21 knots (39 km/h; 24 mph)
- Complement: 156 officers and men
- Armament: 3 × 3-inch/50-caliber guns; 4 × 1.1-inch/75-caliber guns; 9 × Oerlikon 20mm cannon; 2 × depth charge tracks; 8 × depth charge projector; 1 × Hedgehog anti-submarine projector

USS Mason (DE-529), an Evarts-class destroyer escort, was the second ship of the United States Navy to be named Mason, though DE-529 was the only one specifically named for Ensign Newton Henry Mason. USS Mason was one of two US Navy ships with largely African-American crews in World War II. The other was USS PC-1264, a submarine chaser. These two ships were manned by African Americans as the result of a letter sent to President Roosevelt by the NAACP in mid-December 1941. Entering service in 1944, the vessel was used for convoy duty in the Battle of the Atlantic for the remainder of the war. Following the war, Mason was sold for scrap and broken up in 1947.

== Design ==
The Evarts-class destroyer escorts were 289 ft 5 in (88.21 m) long overall, and they had a beam of 35 ft 2 in (10.72 m). They had an average draft of 10 ft 1 in (3.07 m) at their full load displacement of 1,416 long tons (1,439 t). Each ship had a normal crew numbered 156 officers and sailors.

Mason was propelled by a pair of diesel motors manufactured by General Motors, which drove a pair of screw propellers. Her propulsion system was rated to produce 6,000 brake horsepower (4,500 kW) for a top speed of 19.5 knots (36.1 km/h; 22.4 mph). Oil storage amounted to between 131 and 197 long tons (133 and 200 t), which allowed a cruising radius of up to 6,000 nautical miles (11,000 km; 6,900 mi) at an economical pace of 10 knots (19 km/h; 12 mph).

The ship's armament consisted of a main battery of three 3-inch (76 mm) /50-caliber guns in individual pivot mounts, which could be used against air or surface targets. These were supported by a light anti-aircraft battery that initially consisted of four 1.1 in (28 mm) /75-caliber guns in a quadruple mount and nine 20 mm (0.79 in) Oerlikon guns. For attacks against submarines, the ship was equipped with a Hedgehog mortar, eight depth charge throwers, and two depth charge racks.

== Service history ==
Mason's keel was laid down in the Boston Navy Yard on 14 October 1943. She was named after Newton Mason, a naval aviator killed at the Battle of the Coral Sea. Mason was launched on 17 November 1943, sponsored by Mason's mother. The ship was commissioned on 20 March 1944.

Following a shakedown cruise off Bermuda, Mason departed from Charleston, South Carolina, on 14 June, escorting a convoy bound for Europe, arriving at Horta Harbor, Azores, on 6 July. She got underway from Belfast, Northern Ireland, headed for the East Coast on 26 July, arriving at Boston Harbor on 2 August for convoy duty off the harbor through August.

On 2 September, she arrived at New York City to steam on 19 September in the screen for convoy NY-119. Mason reached Falmouth, Cornwall, with part of the convoy 18 October, and she returned to New York from Plymouth, England, and the Azores on 22 November.

On 18 October, Mason supported Convoy NY-119 in a severe North Atlantic storm. The ship suffered and self-repaired critical structural damage and still rescued ships from the convoy. The crew of Mason was not awarded a letter of commendation until 1994 for meritorious service during this action.

Mason joined Task Force 64 at Norfolk, Virginia, on 17 December. Two days later, she sailed in convoy for Europe, passing by Gibraltar on 4 January 1945 to be relieved of escort duties. Continuing to Algeria, she entered Oran on 5 January for the formation of Task Group 60.11. The escort ship cleared Oran 7 January. Four days later, Mason made radar contact with a surface target. She rang up full speed with all battle stations manned to attack the presumptive submarine, rammed, and dropped depth charges. Unable to regain contact, the ship returned to the contact point, where searchlight revealed the target—a wooden derelict about 100 by 50 feet (30 by 15 m). Mason then steamed to Bermuda for repairs, entering St. George's Harbor on 19 January. Five days later, she reached the New York Navy Yard.

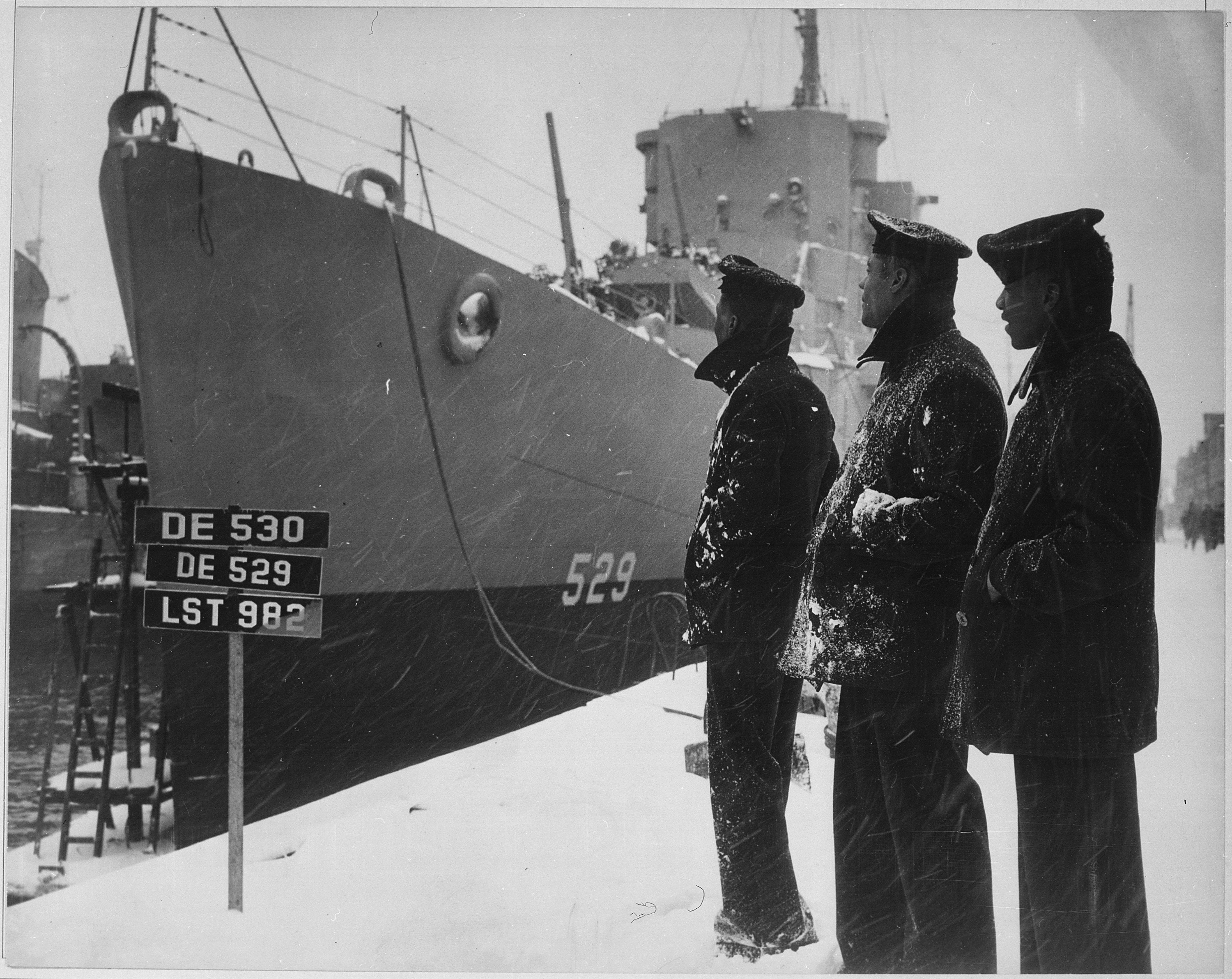
Sailors of USS Mason commissioned at Boston Navy Yard 20 March 1944 proudly look over their ship. (National Archives and Records Administration)

On 12 February Mason departed Norfolk in convoy for the Mediterranean Sea, arriving off Gibraltar on 28 February. She cleared Oran 8 March to guard a convoy to Bermuda and Chesapeake Bay before returning to New York 24 March. After sonar exercises off New London, Connecticut, and fighter-director training with naval aircraft from Quonset Point, Rhode Island, she steamed from Norfolk 10 April with another convoy to Europe, leaving the convoy at Gibraltar 28 April. Mason was two days out of Oran en route to the East Coast when the end of World War II in Europe was announced on 8 May.

Mason arrived at New York on 23 May for operations along the East Coast into July. From 28 July to 18 August, she served as a school ship for the Naval Training Center, Miami, Florida. On 20 August, she arrived at New London to be outfitted for long-range underwater signal testing in the Bermuda area into September. Mason departed from Bermuda on 8 September for Charleston, arriving there two days later. Mason was decommissioned on 12 October, struck from the Naval Vessel Register on 1 November 1945, and sold and delivered to New Jersey on 18 March 1947 for scrapping.

The Arleigh Burke-class destroyer USS Mason (DDG-87) was named in honor of Mason's mostly African American enlisted crew, and the 2004 film Proud dramatizes their story.
