= Stephen Koehler =

United States Navy admiral (born 1964)

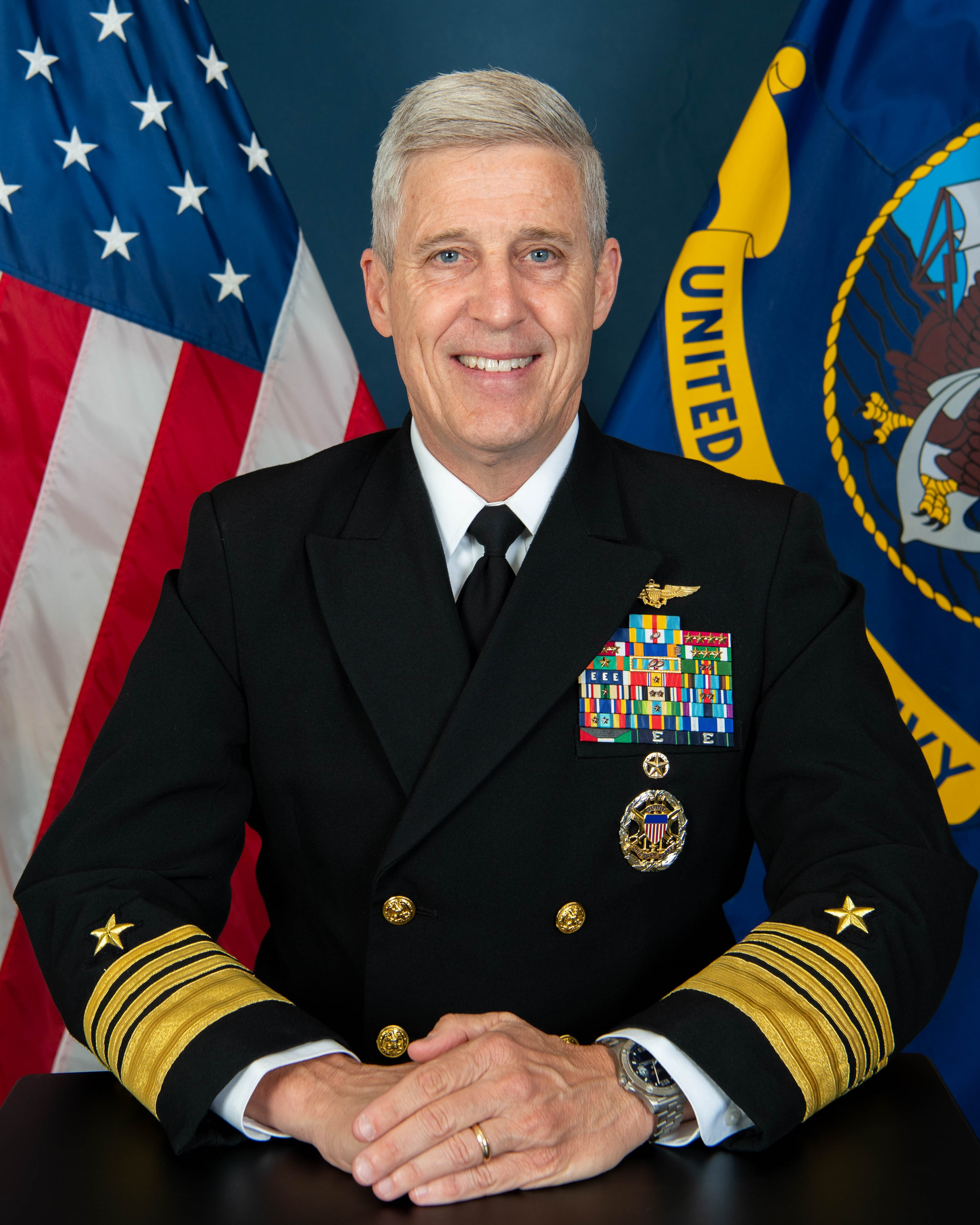
- Born: 15 April 1964 (age 62); Norfolk, Virginia, U.S.
- Alma mater: Joint Forces Staff College; Naval War College (MNSA); University of Colorado Boulder (BS)
- Military career
- Allegiance: United States
- Branch: United States Navy
- Service years: 1986–present
- Rank: Admiral
- Nickname: Web
- Commands: United States Pacific Fleet; United States Third Fleet; Carrier Strike Group 9 USS Dwight D. Eisenhower (CVN-69); USS Bataan; VFA-143
- Conflicts: Gulf War; Iraq War
- Awards: Defense Distinguished Service Medal; Navy Distinguished Service Medal; Defense Superior Service Medal (2); Legion of Merit (5)

Stephen Thomas Koehler (born 15 April 1964) is a United States Navy admiral who serves as the commander of the United States Pacific Fleet. He previously served as the director for strategy, plans, and policy of the Joint Staff from 2022 to 2024 and as commander of the United States Third Fleet from 2021 to 2022.

== Early life and education ==
Koehler was born in Norfolk, Virginia, and raised in San Diego, where he graduated from Mt. Carmel High School in 1982. He earned a Bachelor of Science in Physics from the University of Colorado Boulder in 1986. Koehler holds a master's degree in National Security and Strategic Studies from the Naval War College and also graduated from the Joint Staff College and the Navy Nuclear Power Program.

== Naval career ==
Koehler was commissioned through the Naval Reserve Officers Training Corps (NROTC) in 1986 and designated a naval aviator in March 1989. His command tours include the Pukin' Dogs of Fighter Squadron (VF/VFA) 143, USS Bataan (LHD-5), USS Dwight D. Eisenhower (CVN-69), and Carrier Strike Group 9. Other seaborne assignments include tours in Fighter Squadron (VF) 211, VF-41 and executive officer of the USS Carl Vinson (CVN-70). He was the Director of Operations of the United States Indo-Pacific Command from June 2018 to October 2020.

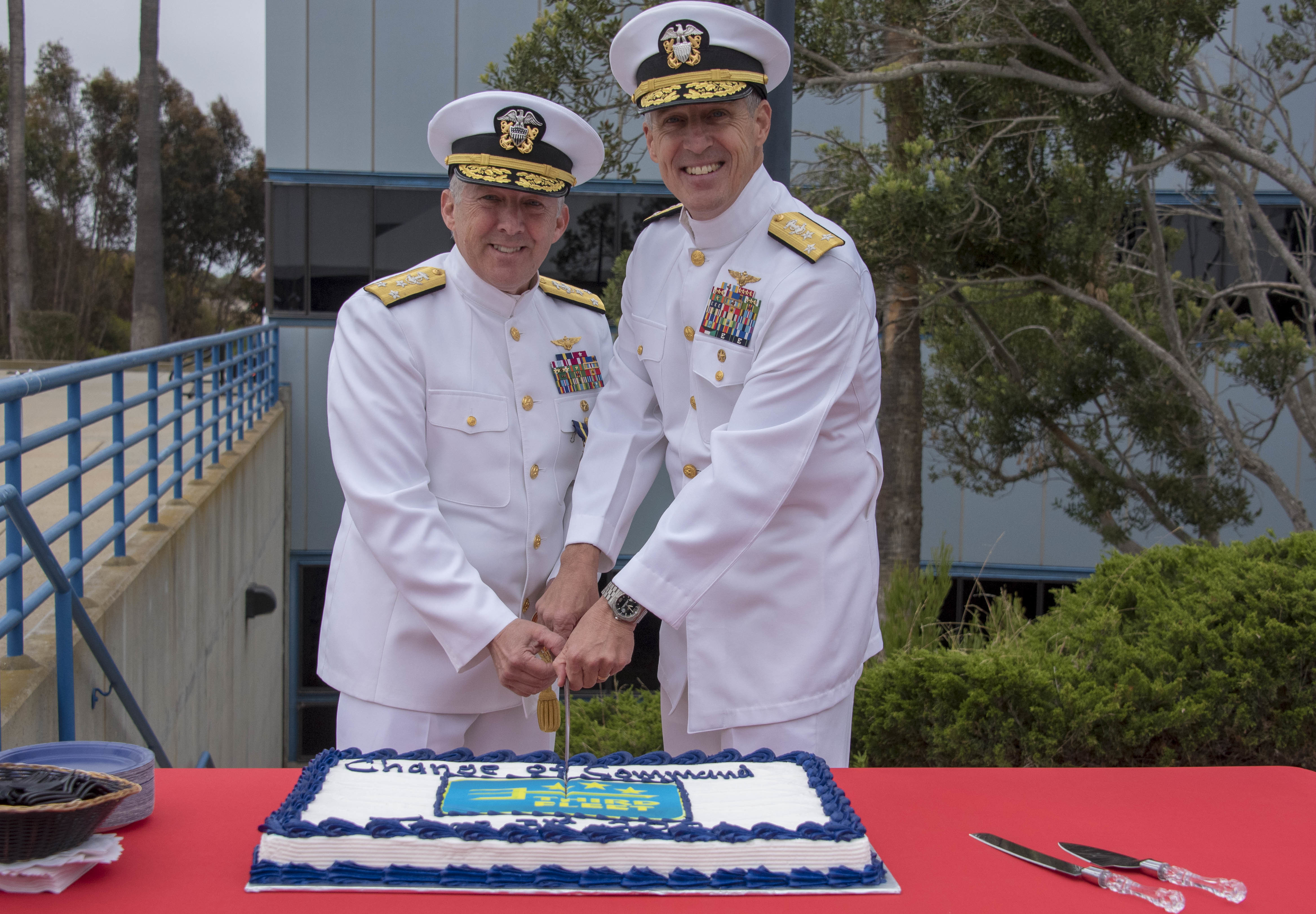
Koehler, right, commander, U.S. 3rd Fleet, and Vice Adm. Scott D. Conn cut a cake after their change of command ceremony on Naval Base Point Loma, 3 June 2021.

Koehler was originally slated to replace Andrew L. Lewis as commander of the United States Second Fleet and Joint Force Command Norfolk in March 2020; despite being confirmed by the Senate, he did not assume command.

In April 2022, Koehler was nominated for assignment as director for strategy, plans, and policy of the Joint Staff and senior member of the Military Staff Committee of the United Nations.

In July 2023, Koehler was nominated for promotion to admiral with assignment as commander of the United States Pacific Fleet.

== Awards and decorations ==

Naval Aviator's Badge
Defense Distinguished Service Medal
| Navy Distinguished Service Medal | Defense Superior Service Medal with one bronze oak leaf cluster | Legion of Merit with four gold award stars |
| Meritorious Service Medal with three award stars | Air Medal with strike/flight numeral "2" device | Navy and Marine Corps Commendation Medal with three award stars |
| Navy and Marine Corps Achievement Medal with award star | Joint Meritorious Unit Award | Navy Meritorious Unit Commendation with two bronze service stars |
| Navy "E" Ribbon with three Battle E devices | National Defense Service Medal with service star | Armed Forces Expeditionary Medal |
| Southwest Asia Service Medal with service star | Iraq Campaign Medal with two service stars | Global War on Terrorism Expeditionary Medal with two service stars |
| Global War on Terrorism Service Medal | Armed Forces Service Medal with service star | Humanitarian Service Medal |
| Navy Sea Service Deployment Ribbon with one silver and one bronze service star | Navy and Marine Corps Overseas Service Ribbon | NATO Medal Ribbon (non-Article 5) |
| Kuwait Liberation Medal (Kuwait) | Navy Expert Rifleman Medal | Navy Expert Pistol Shot Medal |
Command at Sea insignia

Military offices
| Preceded by Samuel Howard | Commanding Officer of USS Bataan (LHD-5); 2010-2011 | Succeeded by Erik M. Ross |
| Preceded by Marcus A. Hitchcock | Commanding Officer of USS Dwight D. Eisenhower (CVN-69); 2013-2015 | Succeeded by Paul C. Spedero Jr. |
| Preceded by James S. Bynum | Commander of Carrier Strike Group 9; 2017-2018 | Succeeded by Daniel W. Dwyer |
| Preceded by Mark C. Montgomery | Director of Operations of the United States Indo-Pacific Command; 2018–2020 | Succeeded by John F.G. Wade |
| Preceded by Kenneth R. Whitesell | Deputy Commander of the United States Pacific Fleet; 2020–2021 | Succeeded by Blake L. Converse |
| Preceded by Scott D. Conn | Commander of the United States Third Fleet; 2021–2022 | Succeeded by Michael E. Boyle |
| Preceded by Lisa Franchetti | Director for Strategy, Plans, and Policy of the Joint Staff; 2022–2024 | Succeeded by Joseph McGee |
| Preceded by Samuel Paparo | Commander of the United States Pacific Fleet; 2024–present | Incumbent |
