= Erik M. Ross =

United States Navy admiral

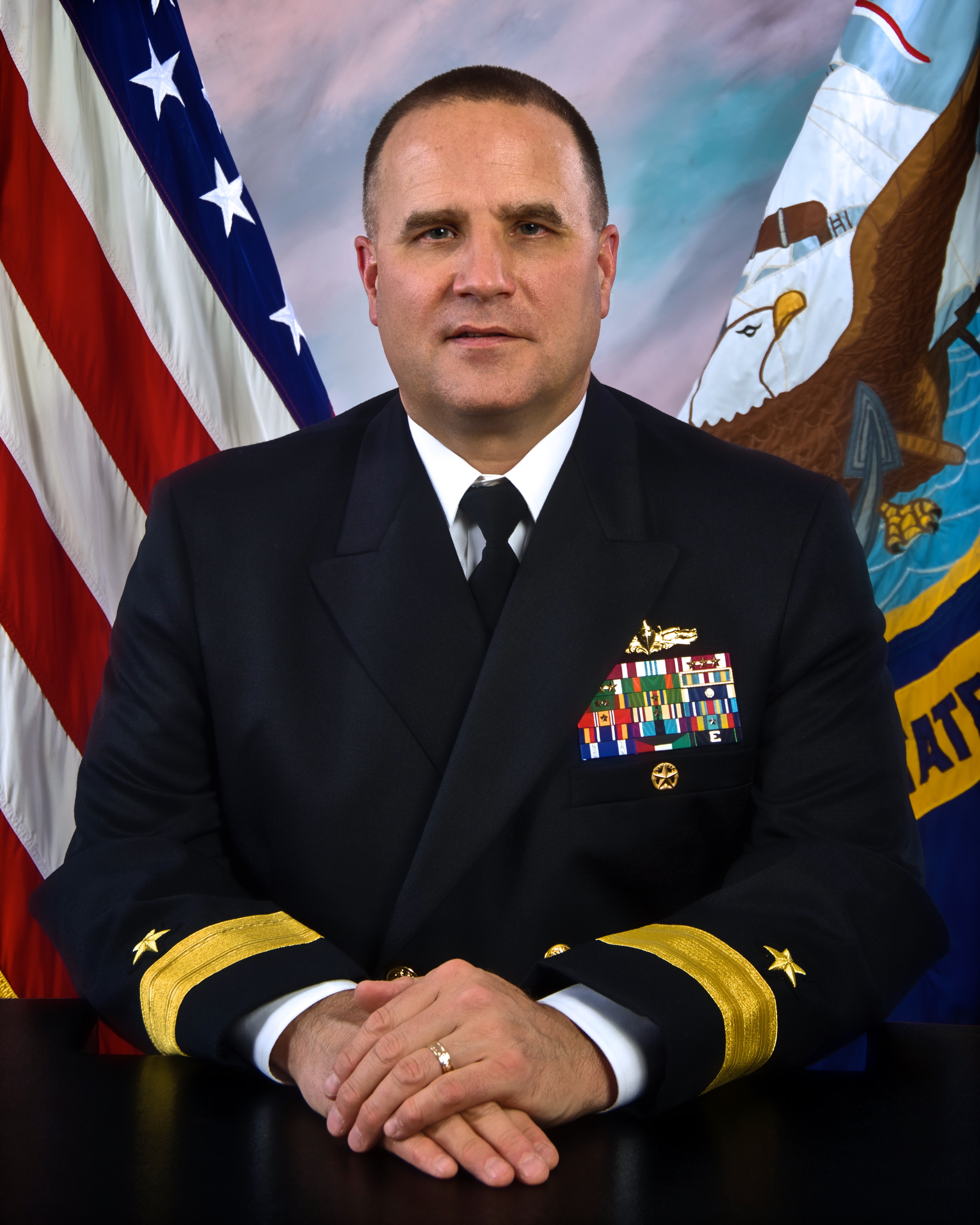
- Born: 1965 (age 60–61)
- Education: Cornell University (BA); University of San Diego (MA)
- Spouse: Cindy Ross
- Children: 3
- Military career
- Allegiance: United States
- Branch: United States Navy
- Service years: 1988–2020
- Rank: Rear Admiral (lower half)
- Commands: Expeditionary Strike Group 2 USS Bataan (LHD-5); USS Whidbey Island (LSD-41)
- Awards: Legion of Merit

Erik Matthew Ross (born 1965) is a retired United States Navy rear admiral and surface warfare officer who last served as commander of Expeditionary Strike Group 2 from July 23, 2019 to September 27, 2019. Prior to that, he served as the 67th President of the Board of Inspection and Survey from June 2017 to May 2019.

== Personal life and education ==
A native of Appleton, Wisconsin, Ross graduated from Appleton East High School. He later graduated from Cornell University with a bachelor's degree in government (with a concentration in international relations) in 1988 and the University of San Diego with a master's degree in international relations in 1995. Ross is married to Cindy Ross and has three children: Matthew, Angel, and Danielle.

== Naval career ==
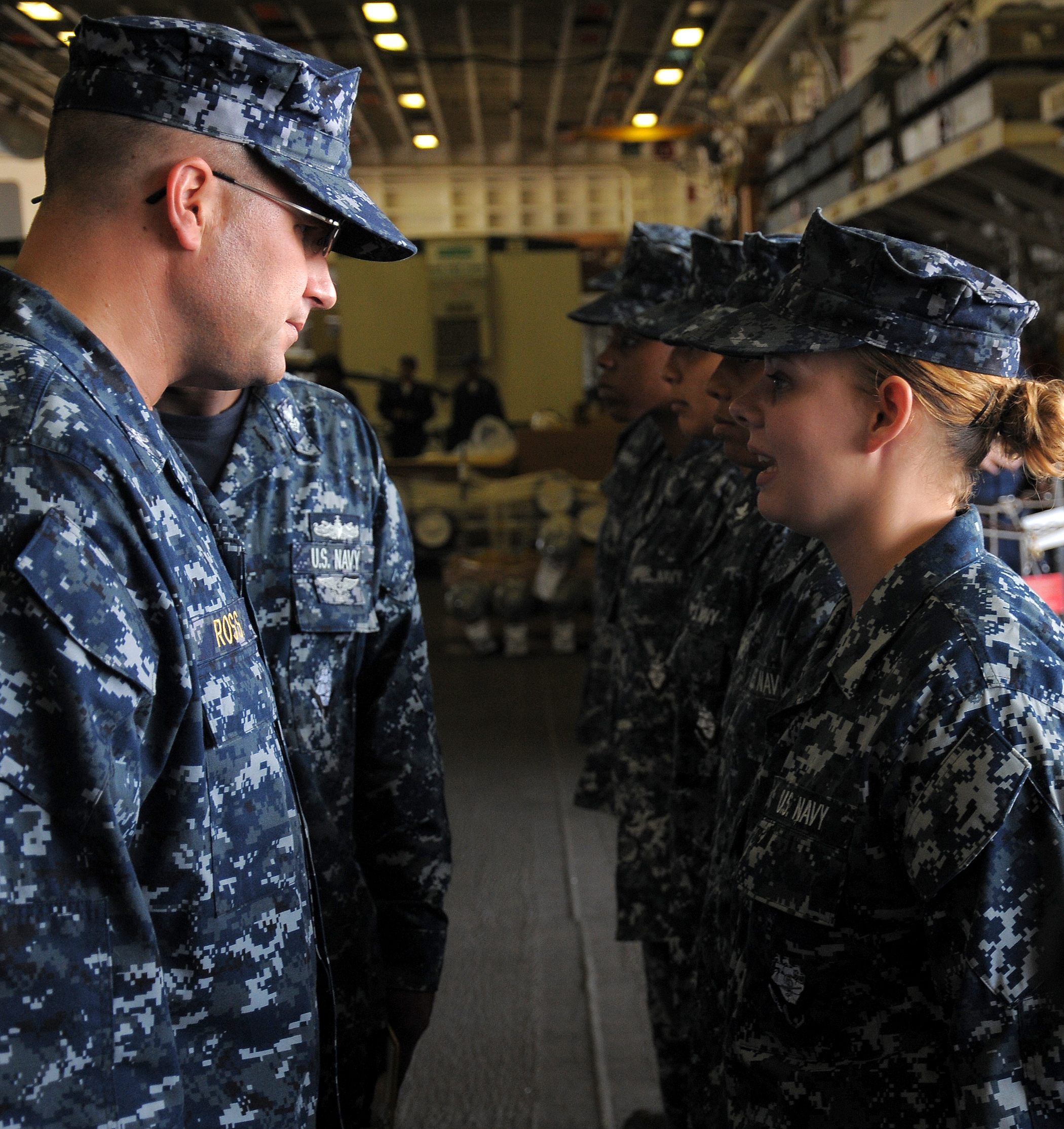
Captain Erik M. Ross, executive officer of the USS Bataan (LHD-5), conducts a personnel inspection on August 9, 2010.

Ross was commissioned as an ensign through the Naval Reserve Officers Training Corps program at Cornell University in 1988. At sea, his earlier assignments include having served aboard the USS Coronado (AGF-11), the USS Callaghan (DDG-994), as executive officer of the USS Pearl Harbor (LSD-52) and operations officer of the USS Tarawa (LHA-1). From 2006 to 2007, Ross commanded the USS Whidbey Island (LSD-41), which included a tour of duty during Operation Enduring Freedom. Ross was executive officer of the USS Bataan (LHD-5) from 2010 to 2011, from which time he was its commanding officer from August 2011 to February 2013.

Ross's shore assignments include serving on the Strategic Planning and Policy Directorate of United States Pacific Command, director of the Fleet and International Training Department (N72) at Surface Warfare Officers School, an instructor at the Navy's Command Leadership School and chief of staff for Commander, Naval Surface Force Atlantic. He assumed the presidency of the Board of Inspection and Survey in June 2017, coupled with a promotion to rear admiral (lower half).

Ross assumed his final command of Expeditionary Strike Group 2 from Rear Admiral John B. Skillman on July 23, 2019 in a change of command ceremony aboard Ross's former command, the USS Bataan.

=== Relief and retirement ===
On September 27, 2019, two months into his tenure, Ross was relieved as commander of ESG-2 by Vice Admiral Andrew L. Lewis due to "a loss of confidence in his ability to command". According to Second Fleet spokeswoman Lt. Cmdr. Ashley Hockycko, his firing was in connection to an “alleged off-duty incident” which called into question the flag officer's judgment. ESG-2's chief of staff, Captain Darren Nelson, assumed command of the group until a permanent replacement was named. Ross's successor, John Mustin assumed command in late 2019, while Ross himself was re-assigned to the staff of Second Fleet.

Ross was taken to admiral's mast by Vice Admiral Lewis and presented with a punitive letter of reprimand for violating Article 133 of the Uniform Code of Military Justice, according to Captain Sarah Self-Kyler, a spokeswoman for United States Fleet Forces Command. He subsequently submitted a letter of resignation and retired on August 31, 2020.

=== Post-retirement ===
Since retiring, Ross has voluntarily publicized his situation and problems with drunkenness to help other military leaders deal with their job stress in a more appropriate manner.

== Awards and decorations ==

Surface Warfare Officer Pin
Legion of Merit	Defense Meritorious Service Medal	Meritorious Service Medal
Navy and Marine Corps Commendation Medal with three award stars	Navy and Marine Corps Achievement Medal	Joint Meritorious Unit Award
Navy Unit Commendation with two bronze service stars	Navy Meritorious Unit Commendation with bronze service star	Navy "E" Ribbon, 4th award
National Defense Service Medal with bronze service star	Southwest Asia Service Medal with bronze service star	Global War on Terrorism Expeditionary Medal
Global War on Terrorism Service Medal	Humanitarian Service Medal	Navy Sea Service Deployment Ribbon with silver service star
NATO Medal Ribbon (non-Article 5)	Kuwait Liberation Medal (Kuwait)	Navy Pistol Marksmanship Ribbon
Command at Sea insignia

Military offices
Preceded by ???	Commanding Officer of USS Whidbey Island (LSD-41); 2006–2007	Succeeded by Michael Junge
Preceded by Stephen T. Koehler	Commanding Officer of USS Bataan (LHD-5); 2011–2013	Succeeded by George J. Vassilakis
Preceded by Jon C. Kreitz	President of the Board of Inspection and Survey; 2017–2019	Succeeded by Christopher Engdahl
Preceded by John Skillman	Commander of Expeditionary Strike Group 2; 2019	Succeeded by Darren Nelson; Acting
