= Allied Command Operations =

NATO strategic command

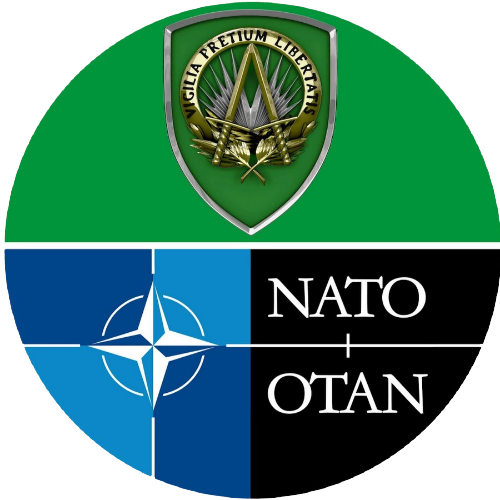
- Emblem
- Founded: 2002
- Part of: (NATO) North Atlantic Treaty Organization
- Headquarters: SHAPE
- Motto: Vigilia Pretium Libertatis
- Website: www.shape.nato.int

Commanders
- SACEUR: General Alexus G. Grynkewich; United States Air Force

The Allied Command Operations (abbr. ACO, French: Commandement allié Opérations) (Note: "English and French shall be the official languages for the entire North Atlantic Treaty Organization." "... the English and French texts [of the Treaty] are equally authentic ...") is one of the two strategic commands of the North Atlantic Treaty Organization (NATO), the other being Allied Command Transformation (ACT). The headquarters and commander of ACO is the Supreme Headquarters Allied Powers Europe (SHAPE) and Supreme Allied Commander Europe (SACEUR), respectively.

== Structure ==
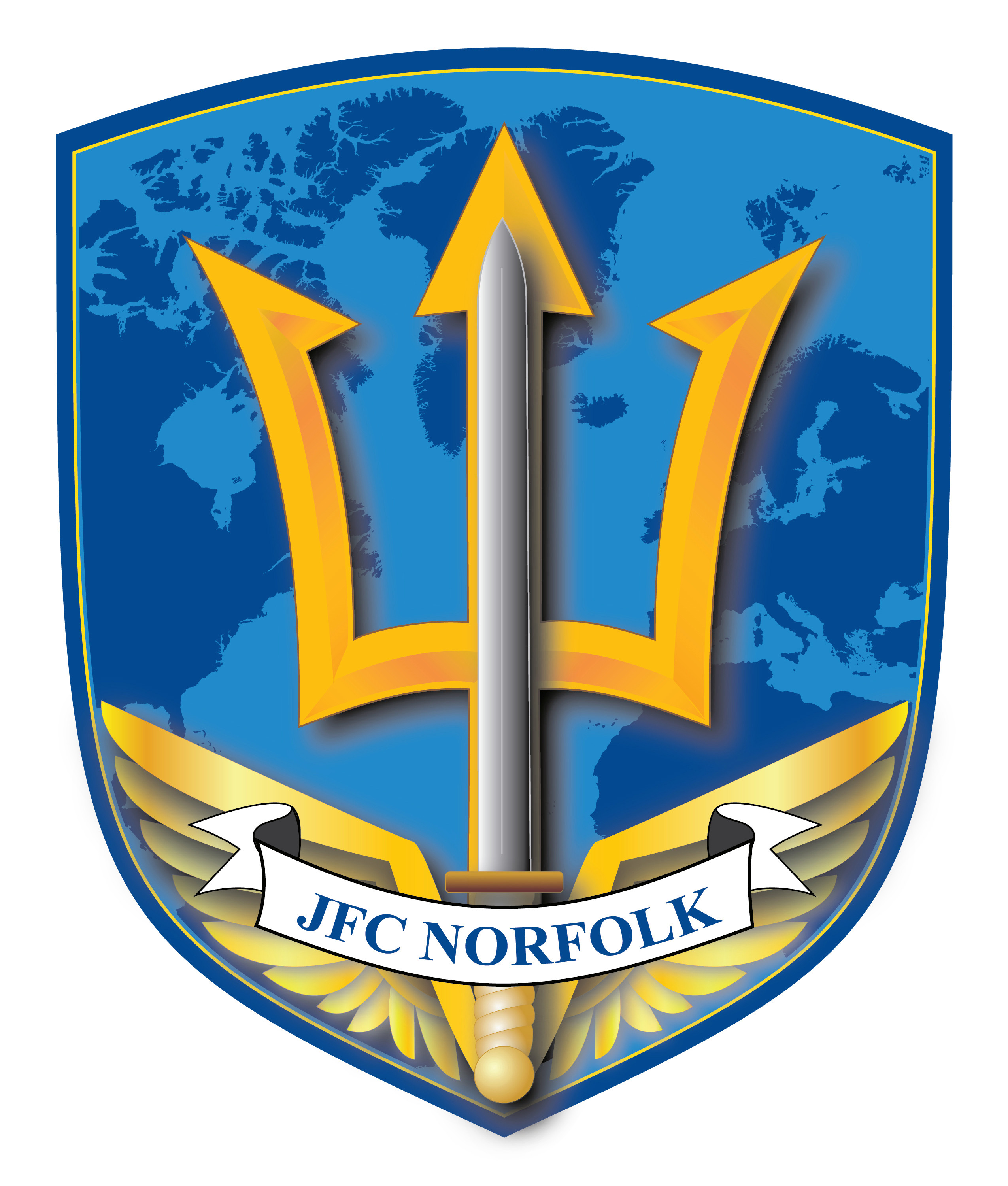
POLITICAL-STRATEGIC LEVEL:	North Atlantic Council (NAC); NATO Headquarters, Brussels, BEL
Secretary-General (SECGEN); NATO Headquarters, Brussels, BEL	International Staff (IS); NATO Headquarters, Brussels, BEL
MILITARY-STRATEGIC LEVEL:
International Military Staff (IMS); NATO Headquarters, Brussels, BEL	Military Committee (MC); NATO Headquarters, Brussels, BEL
STRATEGIC COMMANDS:
Supreme Allied Commander Transformation; Allied Command Transformation (ACT); Norfolk, U.S.	Supreme Allied Commander Europe; Allied Command Operations (ACO); Mons, BEL
TRANSFORMATION COMMANDS:	OPERATIONAL COMMANDS:
Joint Warfare Centre (JWC); Stavanger, NOR	Joint Force Command Brunssum (JFC Brunssum); Brunssum, NLD	Allied Air Command (AIRCOM); Ramstein, DEU
Joint Force Training Centre (JFTC); Bydgoszcz, POL	Joint Force Command Naples (JFC Naples); Naples, ITA	Allied Land Command (LANDCOM); İzmir, TUR
Joint Analysis and Lessons Learned Centre (JALLC); Lisbon, PRT	Joint Force Command Norfolk (JFC Norfolk); Norfolk, Virginia, U.S.	Allied Maritime Command (MARCOM); Northwood, GBR
Joint Support and Enabling Command (JSEC); Ulm, DEU

Under ACO, there are three Strategic Level Commands and three tactical level commands:

Strategic Level Commands:

- Allied Joint Force Command Brunssum (JFCBS), Netherlands
- Allied Joint Force Command Naples (JFCNP), Italy
- Joint Force Command Norfolk (JFC-NF), United States

Tactical Level commands:

- Allied Air Command (AIRCOM) at Ramstein, Germany
- Allied Land Command (LANDCOM) at Izmir, Turkey
- Allied Maritime Command (MARCOM) at Northwood, United Kingdom

Other commands:

- Naval Striking and Support Forces NATO (aka. Strike Force NATO, STRIKFORNATO) at Oeiras, Portugal
- NATO Communication and Information Systems Command (NCISG) at Mons, Belgium
- Joint Support and Enabling Command in Ulm, Germany

=== Joint Force Command Norfolk ===
Joint Force Command Norfolk (JFCNF) was established after allied re-assessment of the security environment which emphasizes the importance of the Atlantic Ocean and its sea lines of communication to Europe. As an organization governed by an international memorandum of understanding (MoU), the command provides the capability to act early in a crisis to ensure a joint deterrent response and improve the responsiveness of NATO within that trans-Atlantic domain.

JFCNF works seamlessly with allies and NATO partners in all domains and to provide awareness and synchronization with allies, while ensuring readiness and contributing to NATO objectives and core tasks. The NATO functions of JFCNF are related to the transition from a crisis to a high-intensity conflict. In this role, the command will contribute to enhance NATO's warfighting capability.

Established in 2018, the first JFCNF commander was Vice Admiral Andrew L. Lewis, USN who also commanded the recently re-established United States Second Fleet, also headquartered in Norfolk, Virginia. As of 2021, the JFCNF and 2nd Fleet commander is Vice Admiral Daniel W. Dwyer, USN.

=== Joint Support Enabling Command ===
SACEUR also has operational command of the Joint Support and Enabling Command.

== See also ==
- Allied Command Transformation
- Operational headquarters of the European Union
- Berlin Plus agreement
