= Daniel W. Dwyer =

U.S. Navy admiral

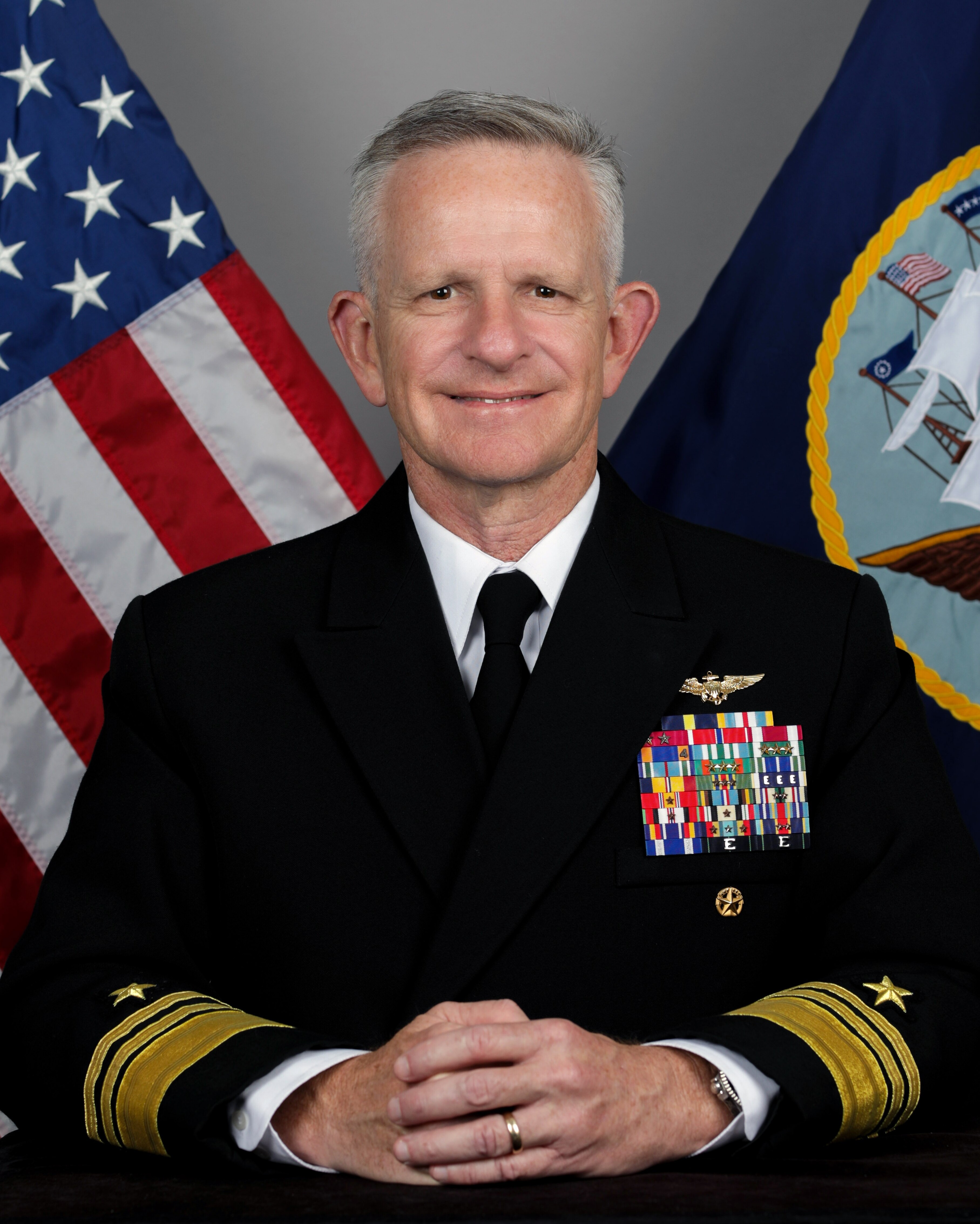
- Official portrait, 2025
- Born: October 29, 1966 (age 59); Alameda, California, U.S.
- Education: California Maritime Academy (BS); University of Phoenix (MS); Naval War College (MA)
- Military career
- Allegiance: United States
- Branch: United States Navy
- Service years: 1988–2025
- Rank: Vice Admiral
- Commands: United States Second Fleet; Joint Force Command Norfolk; Naval Air Training Command; Carrier Strike Group 9 Carrier Air Wing Seventeen; Carrier Air Wing Eight; VFA-106; VFA-27
- Conflicts: War in Afghanistan; Iraq War
- Awards: Defense Superior Service Medal; Legion of Merit (2)

Daniel William Dwyer (born 29 October 1966) is a retired United States Navy vice admiral who has served as the deputy chief of naval operations for operations, plans, strategy, and warfighting development of the United States Navy from 2 August 2024 to 15 August 2025, and briefly as the deputy chief of naval operations for warfighting development in early 2024. He most recently served as the commander of United States Second Fleet and Joint Force Command Norfolk from 2021 to 2024. He served as director of plans and policy of the United States Cyber Command from 2020 to 2021, and as Vice Commander of the Naval Air Systems Command from 2015 to 2016. Born and raised in Alameda, California, Dwyer graduated from the California Maritime Academy with a Bachelor of Science degree in marine transportation in 1988. He later earned a Master of Science degree in computer information science from the University of Phoenix and a Master of Arts degree in foreign affairs and strategic studies from the Naval War College.

== Military career ==
In March 2023, Dwyer was nominated for assignment as deputy chief of naval operations for warfighting development. In July 2024, he was nominated for assignment as deputy chief of naval operations for operations, plans, and strategy.

== Awards and decorations ==
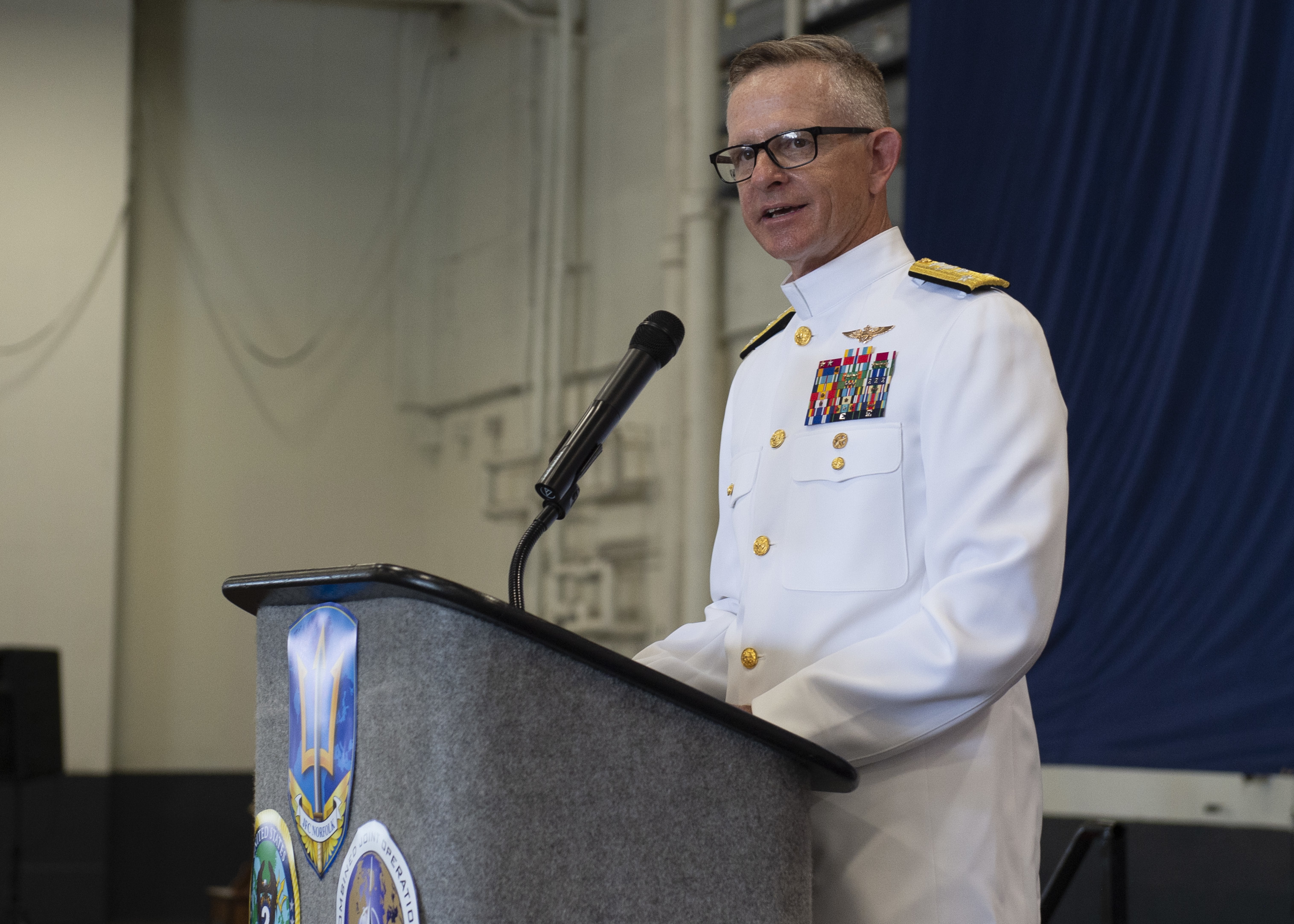
Dwyer provides remarks after assuming command of the United States Second Fleet on 19 August 2021

Naval Aviator's Badge
Defense Superior Service Medal
Legion of Merit with award star	Bronze Star Medal	Meritorious Service Medal
Air Medal with strike/flight numeral "4" device	Joint Service Commendation Medal	Navy and Marine Corps Commendation Medal with three award stars
Joint Service Achievement Medal	Navy and Marine Corps Achievement Medal with three award stars	Army Achievement Medal
Navy Combat Action Ribbon	Navy Meritorious Unit Commendation with three bronze service stars	Navy "E" Ribbon with three Battle E devices
National Defense Service Medal with bronze service star	Armed Forces Expeditionary Medal	Southwest Asia Service Medal with two bronze service stars
Afghanistan Campaign Medal with two bronze service stars	Iraq Campaign Medal with two bronze service stars	Global War on Terrorism Expeditionary Medal
Global War on Terrorism Service Medal	Navy Sea Service Deployment Ribbon with one silver and two bronze service stars	Navy and Marine Corps Overseas Service Ribbon with two bronze service stars
NATO Medal Ribbon (non-Article 5)	Navy Expert Rifleman Medal	Navy Expert Pistol Shot Medal
Command at Sea insignia

Military offices
Preceded by Jeffrey A. Davis	Commander of Carrier Air Wing Eight; 2012–2013	Succeeded by Daniel L. Cheever
Preceded by Stephen T. Koehler	Commander of Carrier Strike Group 9; 2018–2019	Succeeded by Stuart P. Baker
Preceded by Gregory N. Harris	Chief of Naval Air Training; 2019–2020	Succeeded by Robert Westendorff
Preceded by Andrew L. Lewis	Commander of the United States Second Fleet and Joint Force Command Norfolk; 2021–2024	Succeeded by Douglas G. Perry
Preceded by Jeffrey W. Hughes	Deputy Chief of Naval Operations for Warfighting Development of the United States Navy; 2024	Office abolished
Preceded by Eugene H. Black III	Deputy Chief of Naval Operations for Operations, Plans, Strategy, and Warfighting Development of the United States Navy; 2024–2025	Succeeded by Yvette M. Davids
