= Jeffrey Jablon =

US Navy Flag officer

Jeffrey T. Jablon
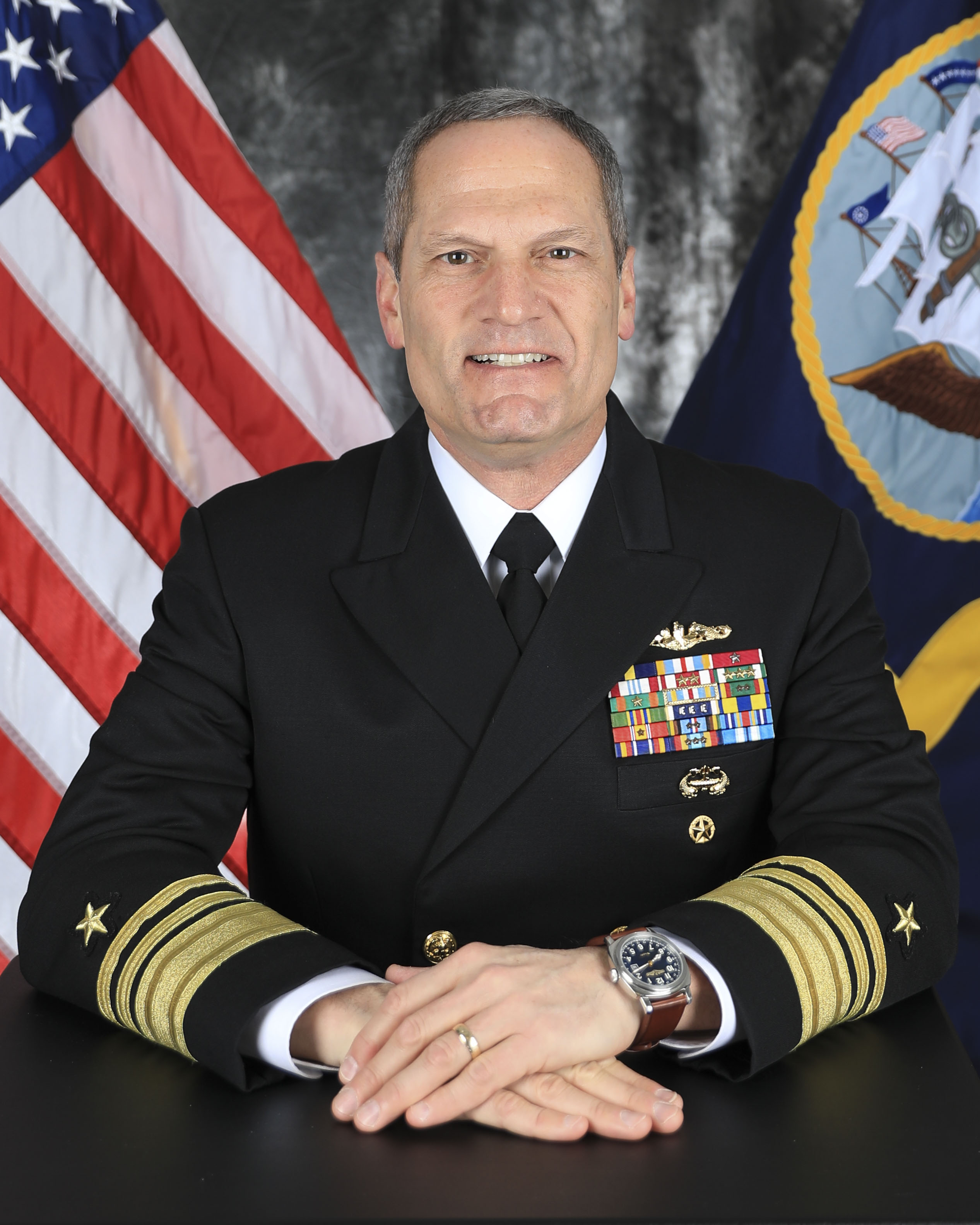
- Official portrait, 2024
- Born: 1964 (age 61–62)
- Alma mater: Virginia Tech; James Madison University (MBA)
- Spouse: Trish Jablon
- Military career
- Allegiance: United States of America
- Branch: United States Navy
- Service years: 1987–present
- Rank: Vice Admiral
- Commands: Submarine Force, U.S. Pacific Fleet; Submarine Group 10; Submarine Development Squadron 5 USS Philadelphia (SSN 690)
- Awards: Navy Distinguished Service Medal; Defense Superior Service Medal; Legion of Merit (5)

Jeffrey Todd Jablon (born 1964) is a United States Navy vice admiral and submarine warfare officer who has served as deputy chief of naval operations for installations and logistics since December 2023. He most recently served as Commander, Submarine Force, U.S. Pacific Fleet from 29 April 2021 to 15 June 2023. He previously served as director of military personnel plans and policy of the United States Navy.

Raised in Frostburg, Maryland, Jablon graduated from Virginia Tech in 1987 with a bachelor's degree in mechanical engineering. He later earned an M.B.A. degree from James Madison University.

In September 2023, Jablon was nominated for promotion to vice admiral with assignment as deputy chief of naval operations for installations and logistics.

== Awards and decorations ==

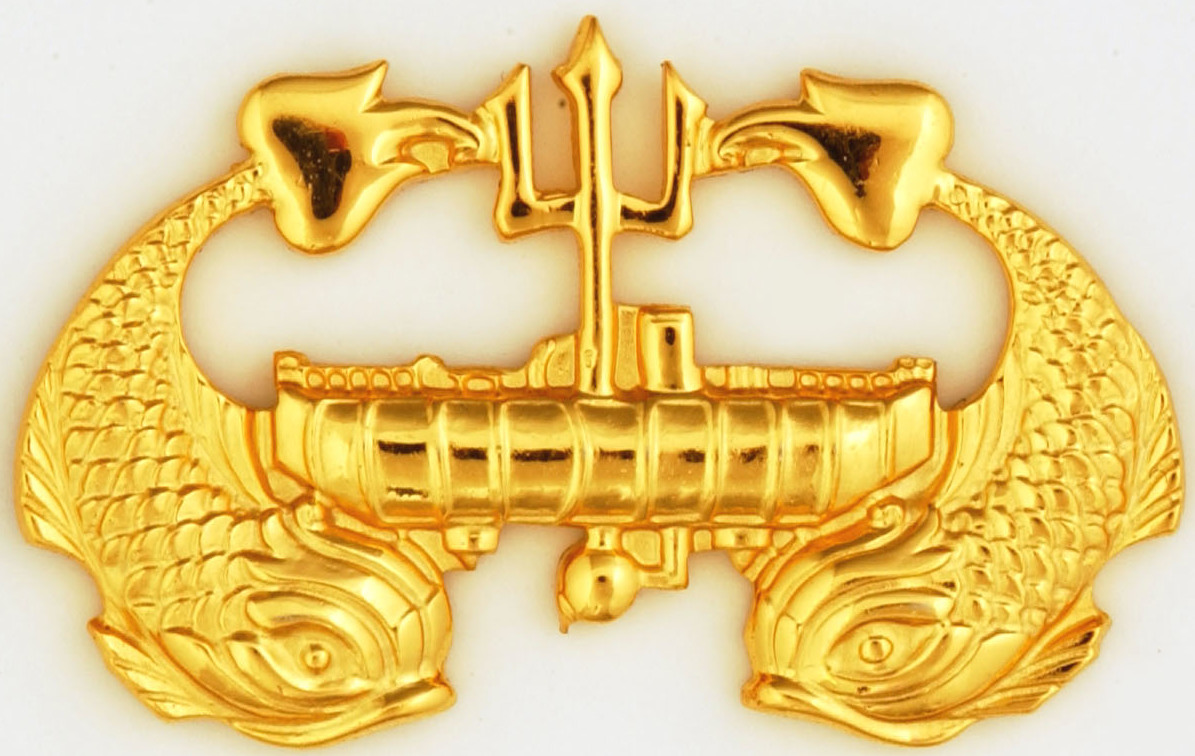

Submarine Warfare Officer Insignia
Navy Distinguished Service Medal	Defense Superior Service Medal	Legion of Merit w/ four award stars
Defense Meritorious Service Medal	Meritorious Service Medal w/ two award stars	Navy and Marine Corps Commendation Medal w/ three award stars
Navy and Marine Corps Achievement Medal w/ award star	Joint Meritorious Unit Award	Navy Unit Commendation w/ two bronze service stars
Navy Meritorious Unit Commendation	Navy E Ribbon, 3rd award	Navy Expeditionary Medal
National Defense Service Medal w/ bronze service star	Armed Forces Expeditionary Medal w/ two bronze service stars	Global War on Terrorism Expeditionary Medal
Global War on Terrorism Service Medal	Navy Sea Service Deployment Ribbon with three bronze service stars	Navy Arctic Service Ribbon
Deep Submergence Insignia in gold
Command at Sea insignia

Military offices
Preceded by Robert J. Brennan	Commanding Officer of USS Philadelphia (SSN 690); 2005–2008	Succeeded by John D. Spencer
Preceded by Brian T. Howes	Commodore of Submarine Development Squadron 5; 2012–2014	Succeeded by Douglas G. Perry
Preceded by Michael P. Holland	Commander of Submarine Group 10; 2018–2019	Succeeded by Michael D. Bernacchi
Preceded by John B. Nowell	Director of Military Personnel Plans and Policy of the United States Navy; 2019–2021	Succeeded by James P. Waters III
Preceded by Blake Converse	Commander, Submarine Force, U.S. Pacific Fleet; 2021–2023	Succeeded by Richard E. Seif Jr.
Preceded by Ricky L. Williamson	Deputy Chief of Naval Operations for Installations and Logistics of the United States Navy; 2023–2026	Vacant
Preceded by Blake Converse	Deputy Commander of the United States Pacific Fleet; 2026–present	Incumbent
