= Douglas G. Perry =

U.S. Navy admiral

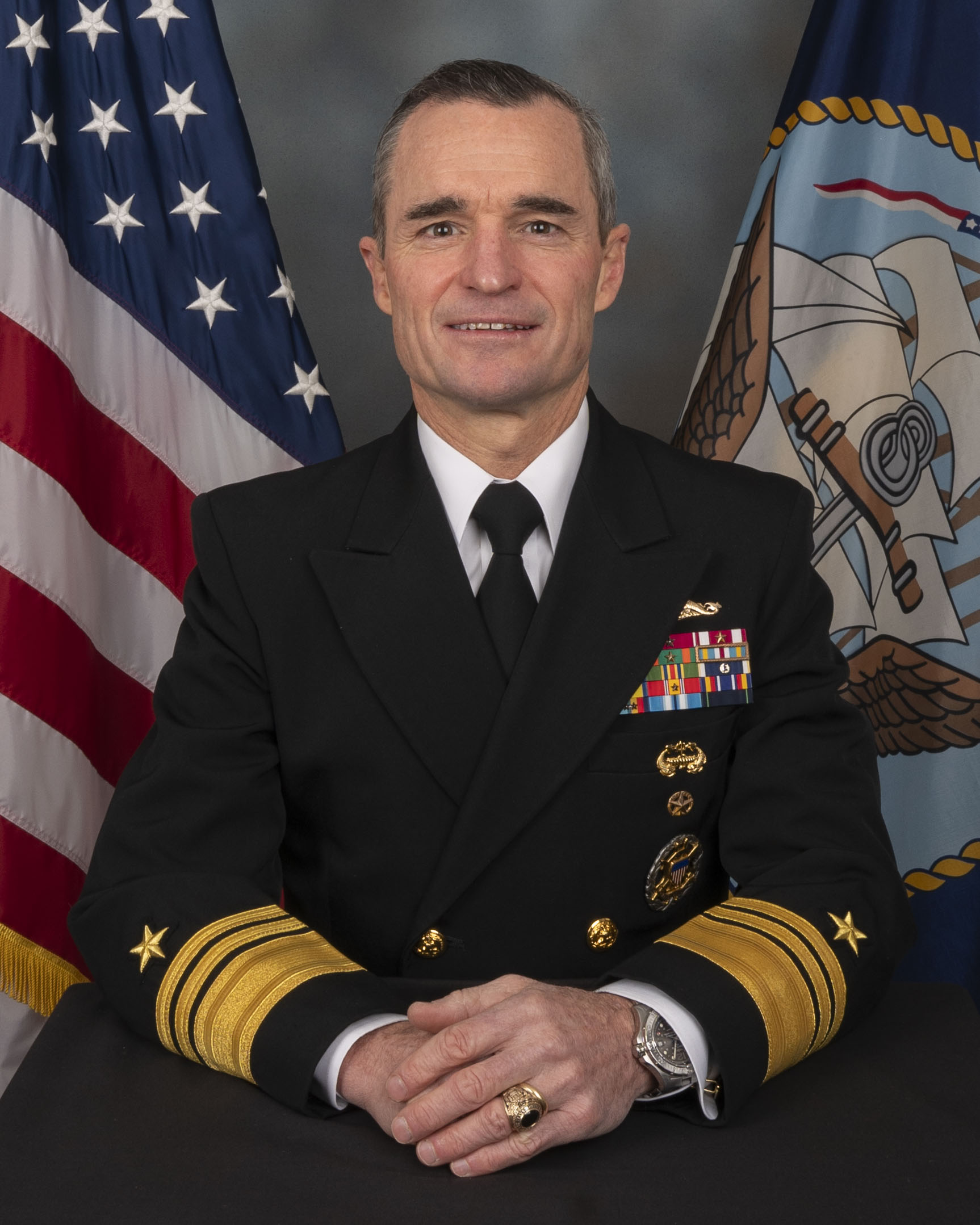
- Official portrait, 2024
- Born: 1967 (age 58–59)
- Education: United States Naval Academy (BS); Marquette University (MS)
- Military career
- Allegiance: United States
- Branch: United States Navy
- Service years: 1989–2026
- Rank: Vice Admiral
- Commands: United States Second Fleet; Joint Force Command – Norfolk; Submarine Group 9 Submarine Development Squadron 5 USS Pasadena (SSN-752)
- Awards: Defense Superior Service Medal (2); Legion of Merit (4)

Douglas Gordon Perry (born 1967) is a United States Navy vice admiral and submarine warfare officer who serves as the commander of the United States Second Fleet. He previously served as the director of the Undersea Warfare Division of the U.S. Navy from 16 July 2021 to 24 July 2023. He most recently served as the commander of Submarine Group 9 from January 25, 2019, to June 8, 2021. Prior to this, Perry served as director of joint and fleet operations of the United States Fleet Forces Command, with command tours as commodore of Submarine Development Squadron 5 from March 2014 to April 2016 and commanding officer of the USS Pasadena (SSN-752) from October 2006 to February 2009.

Perry earned a Bachelor of Science in Aerospace Engineering from the United States Naval Academy in 1989. He also holds a master's degree in Civil Engineering from Marquette University.

== Military career ==
In May 2023, Perry was nominated for promotion to vice admiral. On 12 January 2024, he became commander of the United States Second Fleet and Joint Force Command Norfolk.

== Awards and decorations ==
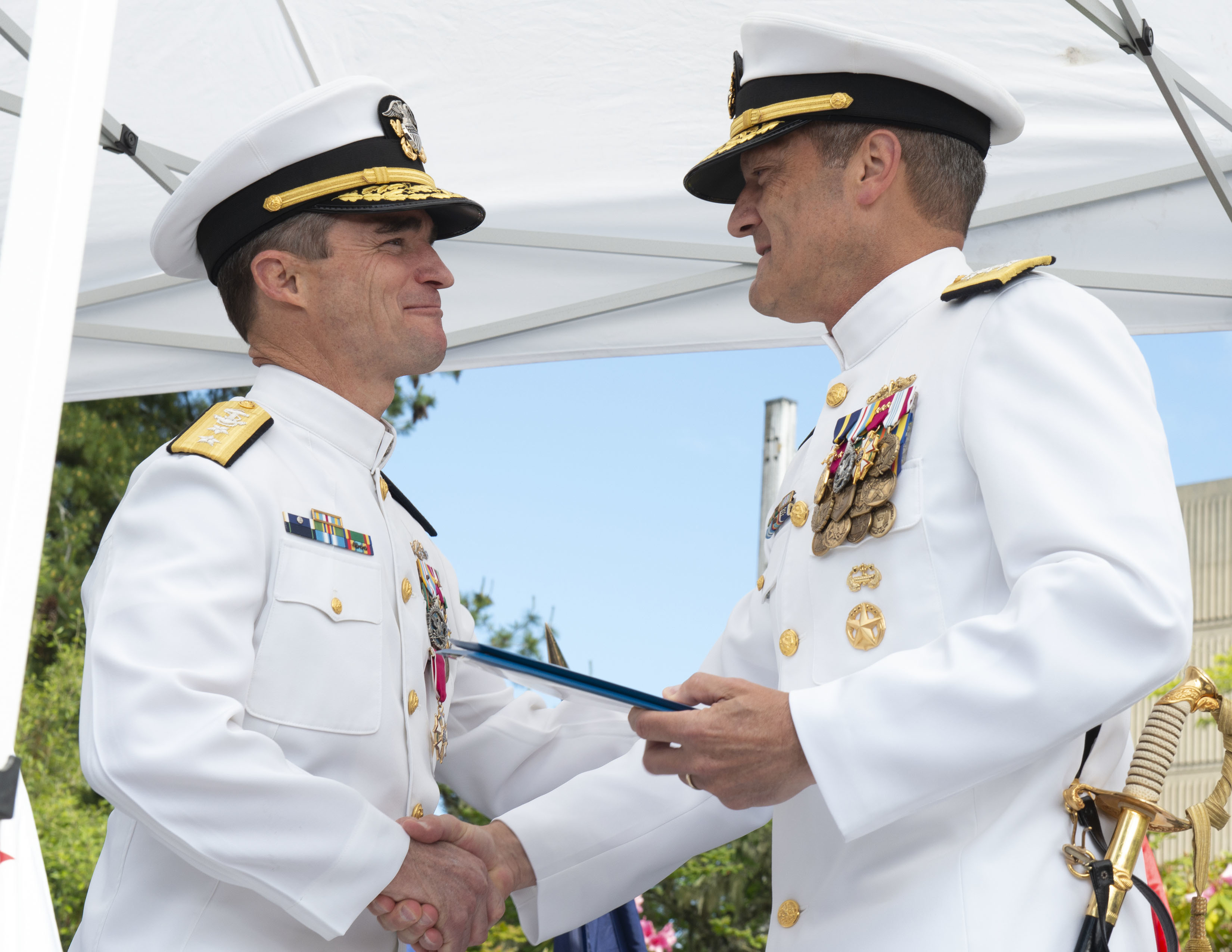
Rear Adm. Perry (left) receives the Legion of Merit from Rear Adm. Jeffrey Jablon (right) during the Commander, Submarine Group 9 change of command ceremony held at Deterrent Park, Naval Base Kitsap-Bangor on 8 June 2021

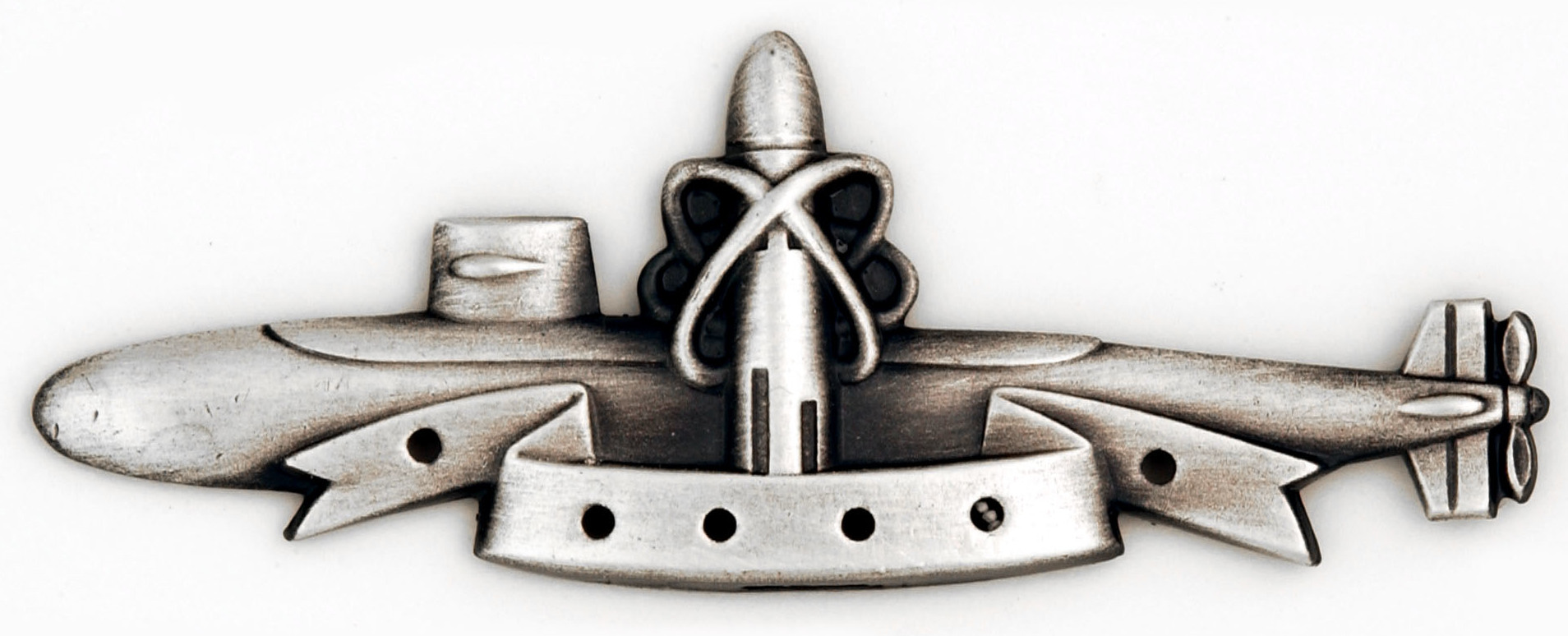
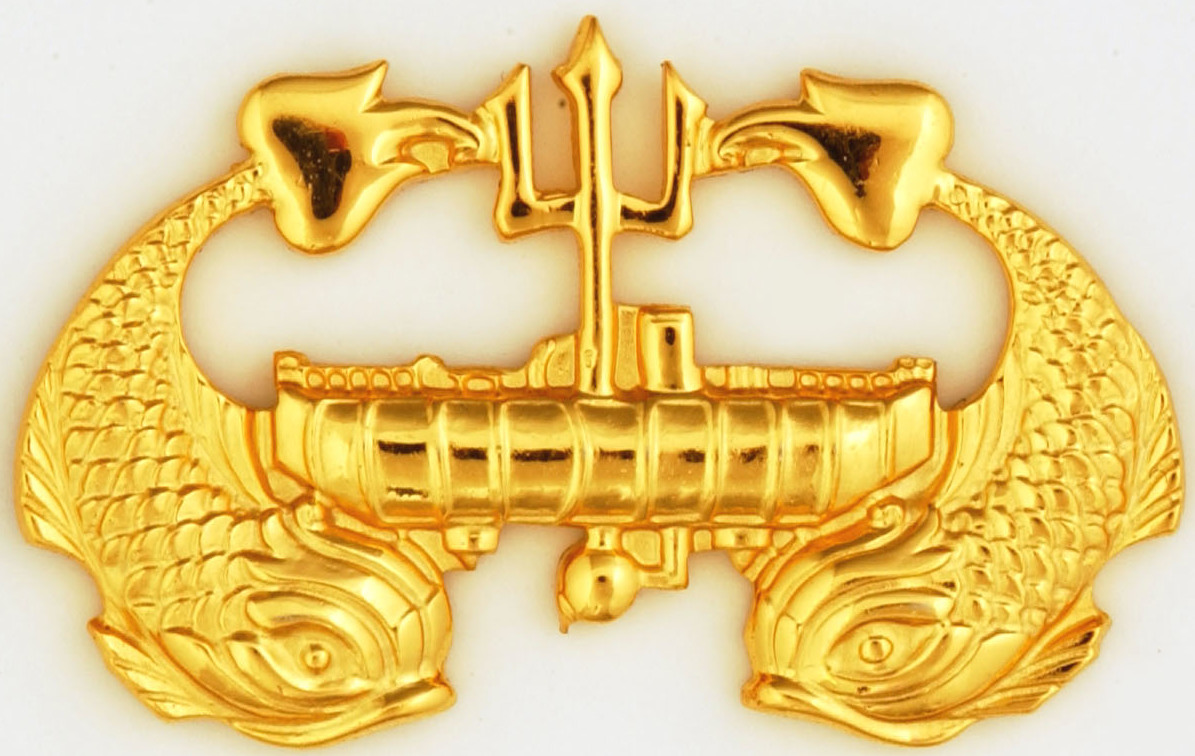

Submarine Warfare Officer Insignia
Defense Superior Service Medal w/ bronze oak leaf cluster	Legion of Merit w/ three award stars	Meritorious Service Medal w/ award star
Navy and Marine Corps Commendation Medal w/ award star	Navy and Marine Corps Achievement Medal w/ award star	Joint Meritorious Unit Award
Navy Unit Commendation	Navy Meritorious Unit Commendation	Navy E Ribbon, 4th award
Navy Expeditionary Medal	National Defense Service Medal w/ bronze service star	Global War on Terrorism Service Medal
Navy Sea Service Deployment Ribbon w/ four bronze service stars	Navy Arctic Service Ribbon	Navy Pistol Marksmanship Ribbon
SSBN Deterrent Patrol Insignia in silver w/ two service stars		Deep Submergence Insignia in gold
Command at Sea insignia
Office of the Joint Chiefs of Staff Identification Badge

Military offices
Preceded by John Heatherington	Commanding Officer of USS Pasadena (SSN-752); 2006–2009	Succeeded by Andrew B. St. John
Preceded by Jeffrey Jablon	Commodore of Submarine Development Squadron 5; 2014–2016	Succeeded by Robert Gaucher
Preceded by Blake Converse	Director of Joint and Fleet Operations of the United States Fleet Forces Command; 2017–2019	Succeeded by Paul Spedero Jr.
Preceded by Blake Converse	Commander of Submarine Group 9; 2019–2021	Succeeded by Robert Gaucher
Preceded by William J. Houston	Director of the Undersea Warfare Division of the United States Navy; 2021–2023	Succeeded by Mark D. Behning
Preceded by Daniel W. Dwyer	Commander of the United States Second Fleet and Joint Force Command Norfolk; 2024–2026	Succeeded by Oliver T. Lewis
