= David Kriete =

United States Navy admiral (born 1963)

David M. Kriete
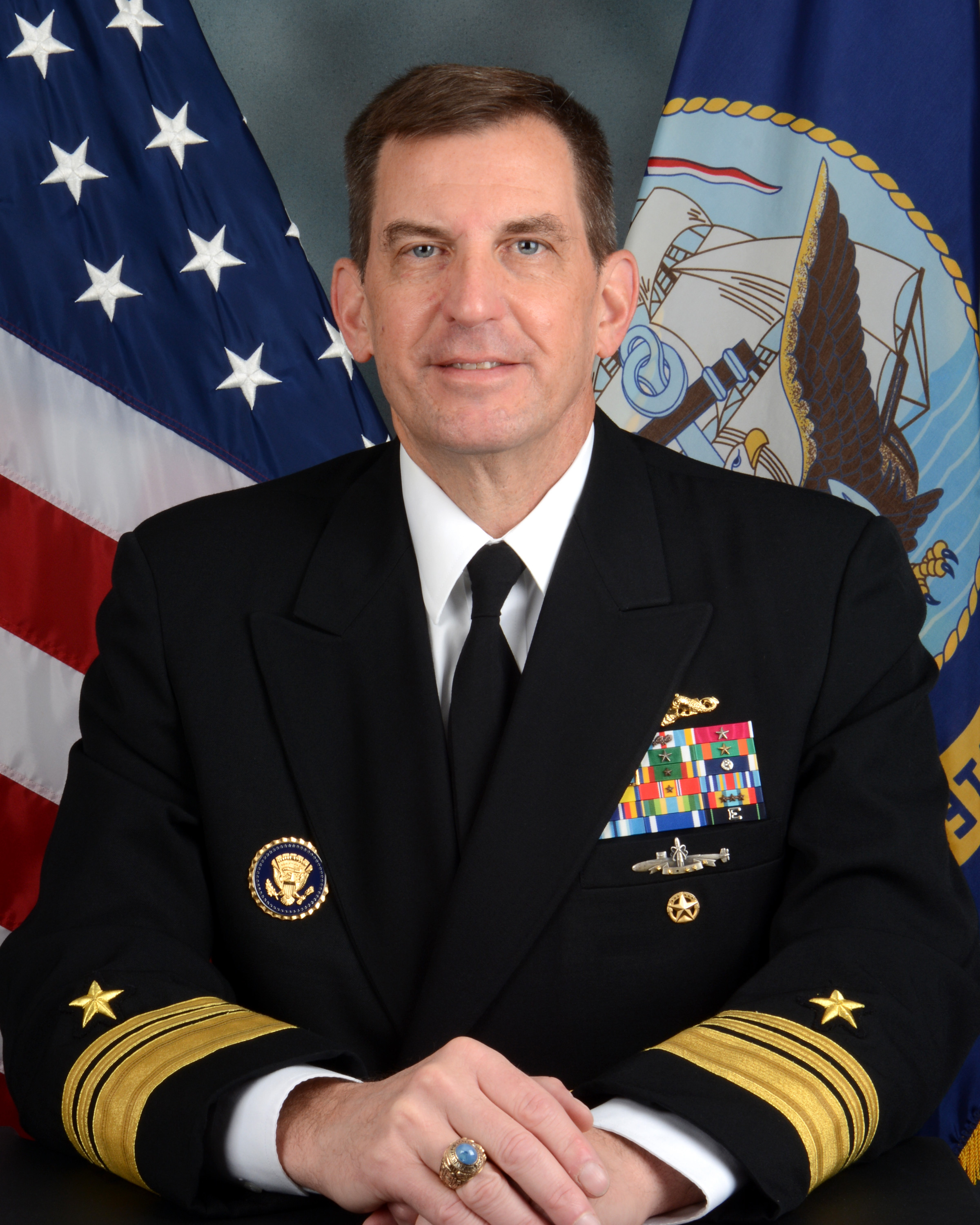
- Born: 1963 (age 62–63); Brooklyn, New York City, U.S.
- Military career
- Allegiance: United States
- Branch: United States Navy
- Service years: 1984–2021
- Rank: Vice Admiral
- Commands: Submarine Group 9 Submarine Squadron 6 USS Rhode Island
- Awards: Defense Distinguished Service Medal; Navy Distinguished Service Medal; Defense Superior Service Medal (3); Legion of Merit (2)

David Matthew Kriete (born 1963) is a retired vice admiral in the United States Navy who last served as the deputy commander of the United States Fleet Forces Command. He is a graduate of the United States Naval Academy and holds a Master’s degree in Engineering Management from Old Dominion University.

== Naval career ==
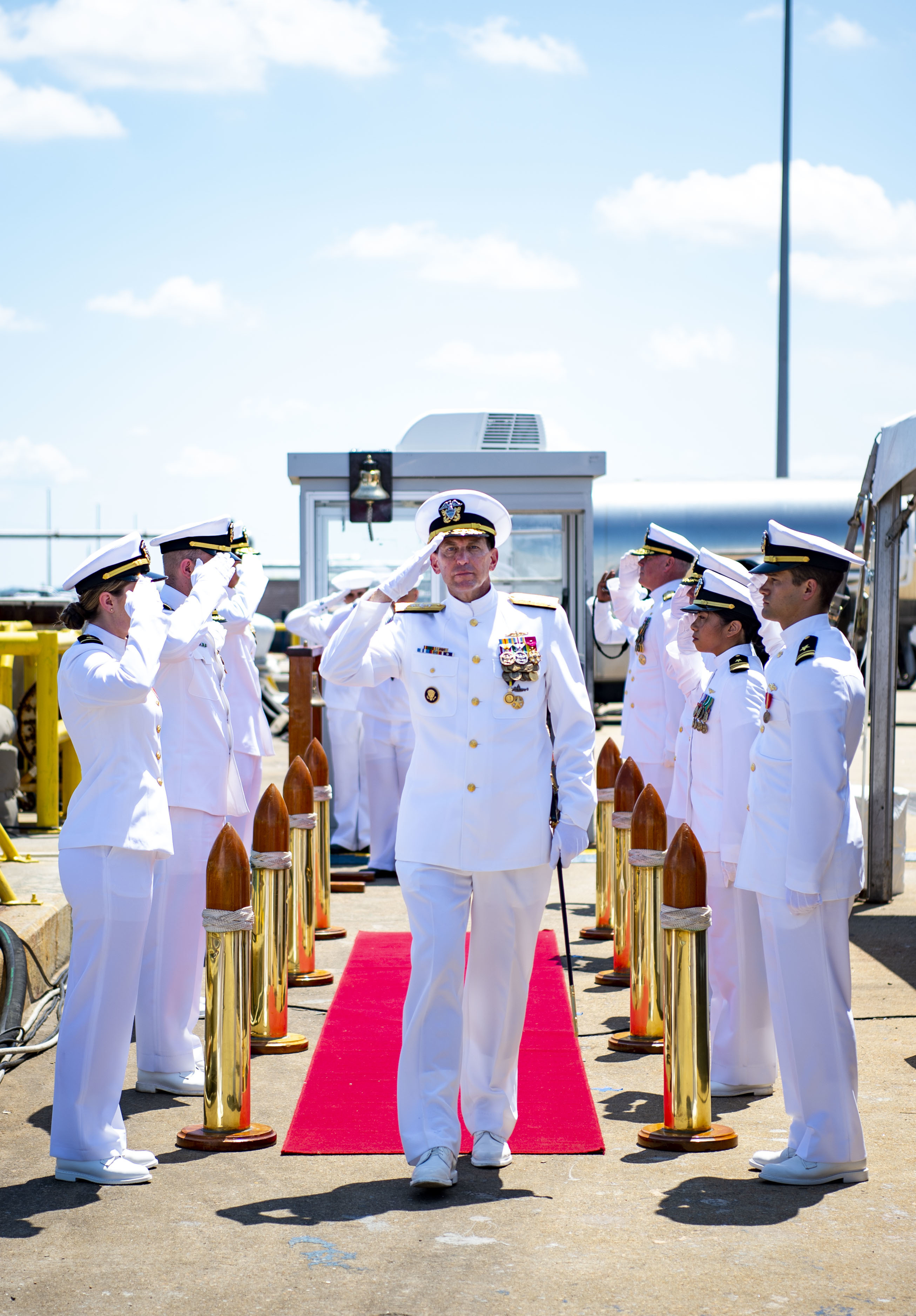
Vice Adm. David Kriete, center, deputy commander, U.S. Fleet Forces Command (USFFC) passes through the side boys during his retirement ceremony on board USS New Hampshire (SSN-78).

Kriete's flag assignments include deputy commander, United States Strategic Command, Offutt Air Force Base, Nebraska; commander, Submarine Group 9 in Silverdale, Washington; deputy director, Plans and Policy, U.S. Strategic Command; and deputy director, Force Employment at United States Fleet Forces Command. He also served as director, Strategic Capabilities Policy, National Security Council where he was responsible for presidential policy on all nuclear weapons related issues.

His operational assignments include command of Submarine Squadron 6 and USS Rhode Island (SSBN 740). He also served aboard USS Kentucky (SSBN 737), USS Flying Fish (SSN-673) and USS Finback (SSN-670).

His shore and staff assignments include chief of staff, Submarine Force Atlantic; Navy Staff, Undersea Warfare Division; Submarine Force Atlantic Tactical Readiness Team and Prospective commanding officer instructor; Joint Staff Nuclear Operations Division; Atlantic Fleet Nuclear Propulsion Examining Board; and Submarine Force Atlantic Special Operations Division.

Kriete had an integral role in the last two Nuclear Posture Reviews. He assumed his latest duties as deputy commander, U.S. Fleet Forces Command May 4, 2020 where he also serves as deputy commander, Naval Forces Northern Command, deputy commander, Naval Forces Strategic Command, and commander Task Force 80. He was also dual-hatted as director Strategic Capabilities Policy, National Security Council.

He retired on July 1, 2021 after 37 years of service.

== Awards and decorations ==

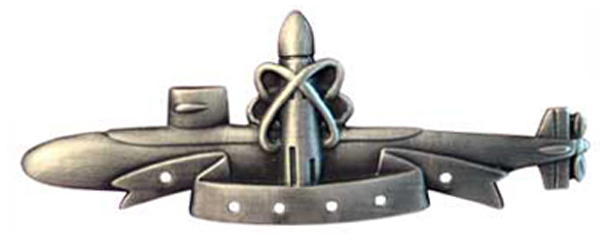

Badge	Submarine Warfare insignia (Officer)		
1st row	Defense Distinguished Service Medal		
2nd row	Navy Distinguished Service Medal	Defense Superior Service Medal (with two bronze oak leaf clusters)	Legion of Merit (with one gold award star)
3rd row	Defense Meritorious Service Medal	Navy Commendation Medal (with silver award star)	Navy Achievement Medal (with gold award star)
4th row	Joint Meritorious Unit Award (with three oak leaf clusters)	Navy Unit Commendation (with one bronze service star)	Navy "E" Ribbon (with a Wreathed Battle "E" device)
5th row	Navy Expeditionary Medal	National Defense Service Medal (with bronze service star)	Global War on Terrorism Expeditionary Medal
6th row	Global War on Terrorism Service Medal	Armed Forces Service Medal	Navy Sea Service Deployment Ribbon (with three service stars)
7th row	Navy Arctic Service Ribbon	NATO Medal for the former Yugoslavia	Navy Expert Pistol Shot Medal
Badge	Silver SSBN Deterrent Patrol insignia (6 awards)		
Badge	Command at Sea insignia		
Badge	Presidential Service Badge		

Military offices
Preceded by Dietrich Kuhlmann	Commander of Submarine Group 9; 2014–2016	Succeeded by John Tammen
Preceded by Charles A. Richard	Deputy Commander of the United States Strategic Command; 2018–2020	Succeeded by Thomas A. Bussiere
Preceded by Bruce H. Lindsey	Deputy Commander of the United States Fleet Forces Command; 2020–2021	Succeeded by James W. Kilby
