= John Tammen =

U.S. Navy admiral

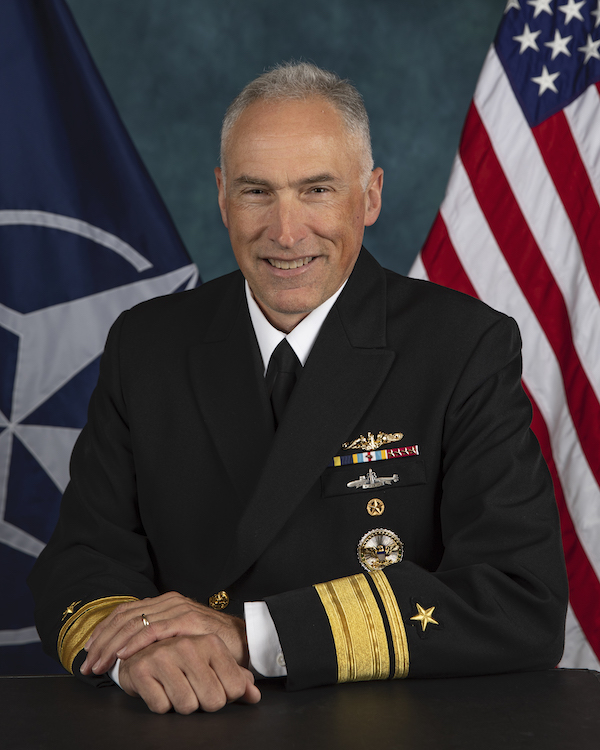
- Official portrait, 2019
- Born: 1962 (age 63–64)
- Military career
- Allegiance: United States
- Branch: United States Navy
- Service years: 1984–2021
- Rank: Rear Admiral
- Commands: Submarine Group 9 Submarine Squadron 19; USS Georgia (SSGN-729)
- Awards: Navy Distinguished Service Medal; Defence Superior Service Medal (2); Legion of Merit (5)

John William Tammen Jr. (born 1962) is a retired United States Navy rear admiral who last served as the Deputy Chief of Staff, Strategic Plans and Policy of the Allied Command Transformation from June 12, 2019 to August 2021. Previously, he served as the Director of Undersea Warfare of the United States Navy from January 2018 to June 2019.

Raised in Washington Township, New Jersey, Tammen graduated from the Rensselaer Polytechnic Institute with a Bachelor of Science degree in mechanical engineering in 1984. He later earned a master's degree in engineering management from Old Dominion University.

Tammen married Linda Louise Correll on December 18, 1994 in Kitsap County, Washington.

Military offices
Preceded by David Kriete	Commander of Submarine Group 9; 2016–2017	Succeeded by Blake Converse
