= Allied Joint Support and Enabling Command =

Operational-level command under the NATO Military Command Structure

- Coat of arms
- Founded: 2018
- Allegiance: NATO
- Type: Joint operational-level support command
- Role: Enablement, reinforcement and sustainment of military forces
- Size: ≈ 450 personnel
- Part of: Allied Command Operations
- Headquarters: Ulm, Baden-Württemberg, Germany
- Website: jsec.nato.int

Commanders
- Commander: Lieutenant General Kai Rohrschneider German Army
- Deputy Commander: Lieutenant General Piotr Malinowski Polish Land Forces
- Chief of Staff: Major General Detlev Simons Royal Netherlands Army

The Allied Joint Support Enabling Command (abbr. JSEC) is a joint operational level command under the NATO Military Command Structure. The command is designed to facilitate the rapid movement of forces across national borders in Europe. According to NATO spokesperson Oana Lungescu, "The new command in Ulm will help our forces become more mobile and enable rapid reinforcement within the Alliance, ensuring we have the right forces in the right place at the right time". It is under the operational command of Supreme Allied Commander Europe (SACEUR).

The headquarters is staffed by 450 military and civilian staff. It is located in Ulm, Germany. Its first commander was Lieutenant General Jürgen Knappe, also concurrently Commander Multinational Joint Headquarters Ulm. The command was declared initial operational capable on 20 September 2019.

== Background ==
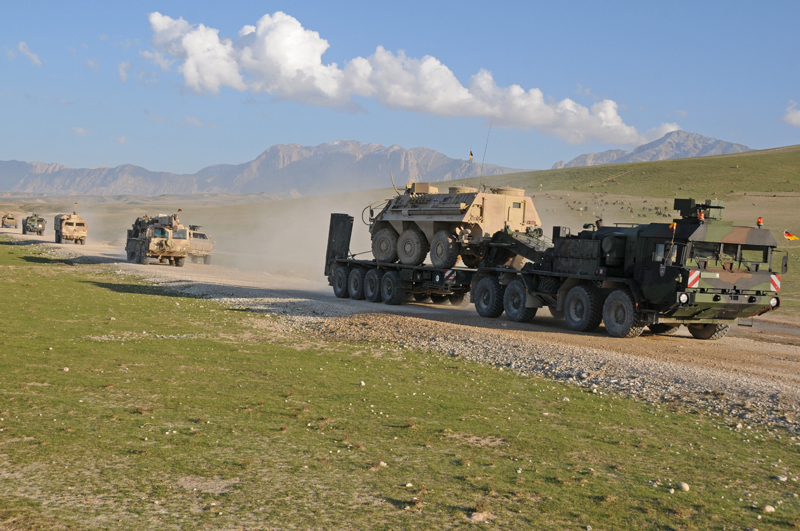
Joint Support and Enabling Command is responsible for coordinating the reinforcement and subsequent sustainment of NATO forces during war

The JSEC was announced at the same time as Joint Force Command Norfolk, established to help protect maritime transport and sea lines of communication between North America and Europe; At the time of its original design it was said to be modeled after the Bundeswehr Joint Support Service Command.

The command was designed in light of growing hostilities between European countries and Russia since the annexation of Crimea in 2014 and in response to logistic and bureaucratic hurdles limiting military logistics in case of a crisis. A research paper by the German Federal Academy for Security Policy mentions specific logistical issue such as modernizing diplomatic clearances required for troop movement, loading capacity standards for trucks, ascertaining which roads, tunnels and bridges in Europe can withstand tank and other heavy vehicle's movement. The German Federal Academy for Security Policy's view is that the forming of JSEC is a possible driver for the establishment of a "Military Schengen".

== See also ==
- Military Mobility
