= Blake Converse =

U.S. Navy admiral

Blake L. Converse
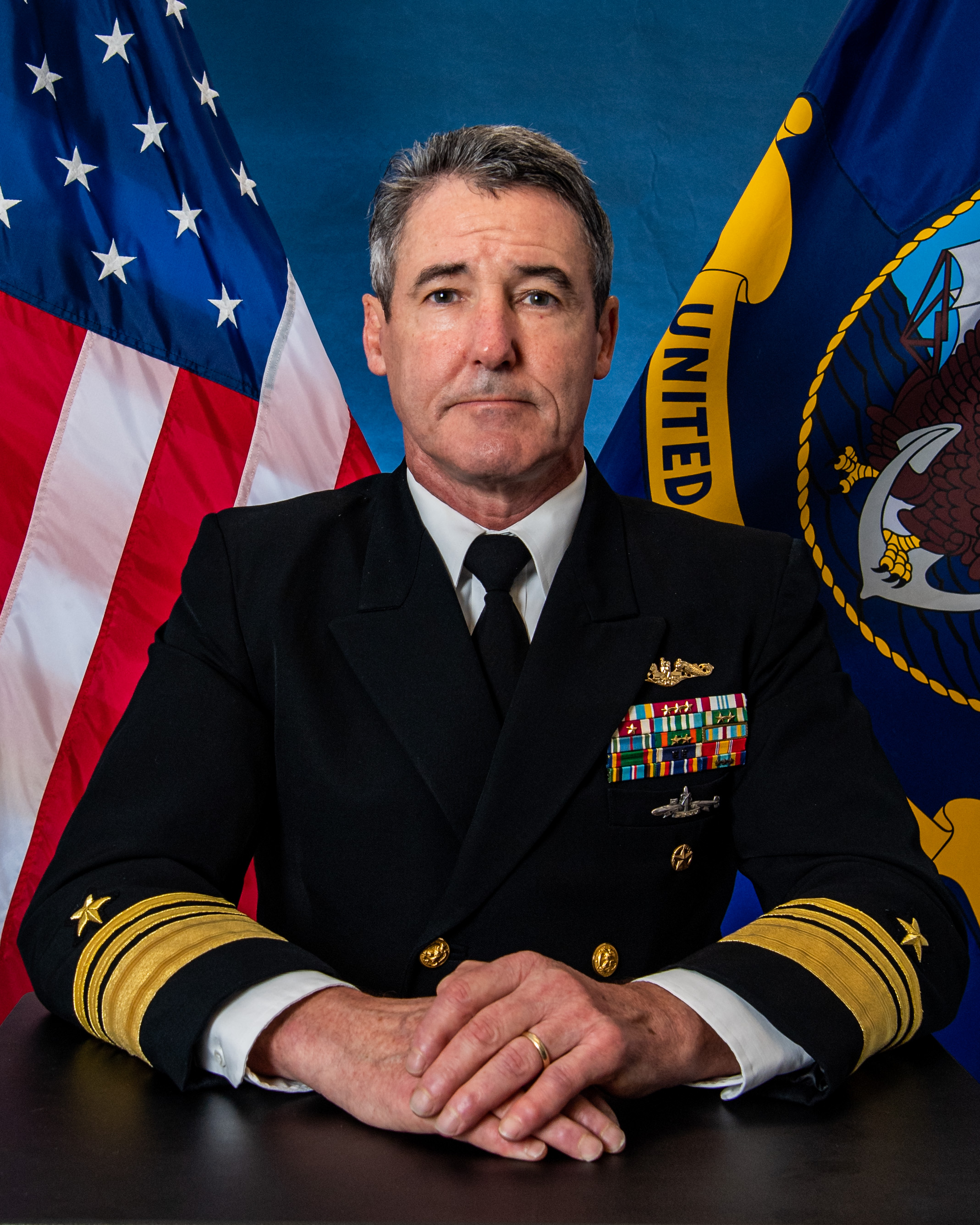
- Born: 1965 (age 60–61); Pennsylvania, U.S.
- Education: Pennsylvania State University (BS); Naval Postgraduate School (MS)
- Spouse: Amy Converse
- Children: 2 (Samuel and Ben)
- Military career
- Allegiance: United States of America
- Branch: United States Navy
- Service years: 1987–2025
- Rank: Vice Admiral
- Commands: Submarine Force, U.S. Pacific Fleet; Submarine Group 9 Submarine Squadron 6 USS Louisiana (SSBN 743)
- Awards: Defense Superior Service Medal; Legion of Merit (5); Rear Admiral Jack N. Darby Award for Inspirational Leadership and Excellence of Command

Blake Lamont Converse (born 1965) is a retired United States Navy vice admiral and submarine warfare officer serving as deputy commander of the United States Pacific Fleet since May 7, 2021. As deputy commander, he deputizes for the Commander, U.S. Pacific Fleet and handles the fleet's day-to-day administration from headquarters in Joint Base Pearl Harbor–Hickam. He previously served as commander of submarine forces of the Pacific Fleet from 21 February 2019 to 29 April 2021.

Converse's flag assignments include Director, Joint and Fleet Operations (N3), United States Fleet Forces Command and Commander, Submarine Group 9.

In September 2023, Converse was nominated for promotion to vice admiral.

Military offices
Preceded by John K. McDowell	Commanding Officer of USS Louisiana (SSBN 743); 2006–2009	Succeeded by Eric P. Woelper
Preceded by Eugene E. Sievers	Commander of Submarine Squadron 6; 2012–2014	Succeeded by Paul S. Snodgrass
Preceded by John W. Tammen Jr.	Commander of Submarine Group 9; 2017–2019	Succeeded by Douglas G. Perry
Preceded by Daryl L. Caudle	Commander, Submarine Force, U.S. Pacific Fleet; 2019–2021	Succeeded by Jeffrey T. Jablon
Preceded by Stephen T. Koehler	Deputy Commander of the United States Pacific Fleet; 2021–2025	Succeeded by Jeffrey T. Jablon
