= Western Hemisphere Group =

United States Navy formation

The Western Hemisphere Group was a United States Navy formation active from 1 September 1995 to 1999–2000. Headquarters was at Naval Station Mayport, Florida.

In 1996 a U.S. Navy study said that "the recently created Western Hemisphere Group, composed of 16 naval surface ships—including two Aegis cruisers-serves as the operational center of gravity for future naval strategy in the Western Hemisphere;" and that "the Western Hemisphere Group will serve primarily as the naval forces component (CTF 125 [Commander Task Force 125]) to COMSECONDFLT (JTF120 [Joint Task Force 120]) and will train for operations in support of theater objectives."

In October 1996 Commander U.S. Second Fleet created Task Force 28, consisting of independent deployers operating in both the Caribbean Sea and Eastern Pacific. Commander, Western Hemisphere Group was assigned as Commander Task Force 28 (CTF 28). This arrangement assigned COMWESTHEMGRU the operational control (OPCON) of these Second Fleet destroyers.
