= James Madison University College of Business =

American university college

Coordinates: 38°25′59.8″N 78°52′21.6″W

James Madison University – College of Business
- Type: Public
- Established: 1972
- Dean: Dr. Michael E. Busing (Jan. 2, 2019)
- Academic staff: 154 full-time
- Students: 5,190 students
- Location: (United States) Harrisonburg, Va, USA
- Campus: Urban
- Website: jmu.edu/cob

The College of Business is the business school of James Madison University in Harrisonburg, Virginia. It is a fully accredited business school that offers undergraduate degrees in accounting, computer information systems, business analytics, economics, finance and business law, international business, management, marketing, and quantitative finance. Additionally, the College of Business offers two master of business administration programs – an Innovation MBA program and an Information Security MBA program. The college also offers a master of science in accounting. It has received recognitions and awards from multiple organizations, including being listed in BusinessWeek's Top 5% Undergraduate Programs and the 40th best business school in the United States. Its facilities are located in Zane Showker Hall on the southwestern part of JMU's campus.

== History ==
The College of Business at JMU was first accredited in the 80s by The Association to Advance Collegiate Schools of Business. The graduate and undergraduate programs in accounting and business were reaccredited in 2012.

== Academic program ==
Each student majoring in one of the college's fields must take a core set of classes referred to as the Bachelor of Business Administration Core. At the end of sophomore year, students apply for admission into the College of Business. Admission into the college is competitive and each student must achieve a 2.7 grade point average in the COB prerequisite courses to be considered for admission. These classes are taken throughout the student's career, culminating in a course called COB 300, which is a 12-credit integrated class where the student connects the fundamentals of business in four functional areas: management, marketing, operations, and finance. Students are separated into groups for the task of creating a business plan for a business they create. The grade on the business plan factors into each student's final grades in all four COB 300 courses. The program maintains a "no entitlement mentality" that provides students with "a dose of a practical business environment."

=== Accounting ===
The School of Accounting is an academic unit of the College of Business. The School of Accounting offers a Bachelor of Business Administration degree and a Master of Science degree in accounting (MSA). Most students choose to receive both degrees and thereby satisfy the 150 semester hours of education required in most states to be eligible to sit for the CPA exam. The JMU MSA program is ranked as the number one university in the country in pass rate for the Certified Public Accounting (CPA) exam, according to the 2011 National Association of State Boards of Accountancy report.

=== Computer information systems and business analytics ===
The computer information systems and business analytics program at James Madison University educates students for careers in IT and technology management. CIS graduates understand both technical and organizational factors and can assist an organization in determining how information and technology-enabled business processes provide a foundation for strong organizational performance. CIS professionals serve as a bridge between the technical and management communities within an organization. The bachelor's degree program in Computer Information Systems is accredited by the Computing Accreditation Commission of ABET.

In 2014, USA Today (together with College Factual) ranked the James Madison University CIS program #2 in the United States. In 2013, JMU's undergraduate CIS program was ranked as the #10 information systems program in the country by Bloomberg Businessweek. In November 2008, TechRepublic, an online trade publication and social community for IT professionals owned by CBS Interactive, selected James Madison University's undergraduate Computer Information Systems program as one of the Top Ten Undergraduate Information Technology programs in the United States.

=== Economics ===
There are three possible economics degrees at JMU: a B.B.A., B.A., and B.S. Also, students may select general economics or select from five concentrations: Political Economy, Financial Economics, International Economics, Environmental and Natural Resources Economics and Socioeconomics.

=== Finance and business law ===
The Finance and Business Law department offers a BBA in Finance and a BS in Quantitative Finance. The head of the department is Hui He Sono, PhD, CFA. The department's mission statement states that the department "strives to prepare students for decision-making roles in an increasingly technological and global environment."

=== Hospitality and tourism management ===
Hospitality and tourism management is a part of the School of Hospitality, Sport and Recreation Management.

=== International business ===
The international Business program was instituted in 1978 by the College of Business. The program offers students a thorough grounding in business, foreign culture, and language.

=== Management ===
The management program offers a curriculum leading to the BBA degree with a major in management. Management majors are exposed to information, exercises, cases, and assignments designed to enhance leadership skills, critical thinking, and analytical decision-making abilities. Students gain a basic understanding of how to apply key managerial concepts and theories in the contemporary work environment. They also learn how to integrate the functional areas of an organization, and how to understand human resource policies and procedures used by organizations and managers. JMU's management curriculum focuses on technical skills, teamwork, and analyzing and solving complex problems. Depending on the concentration, the major in management prepares graduates for entry‑level jobs in large, medium, and small profit and non‑profit organizations, as well as government. The management major prepares graduates for jobs in industries such as manufacturing, consulting, retail, banking, public utilities, personal services, pharmaceutical products, consumer products, restaurants, insurance, and small business.

=== Marketing ===
The marketing program prepares students for careers by developing skills in the management of customer relationships through the creation, communication, and delivery of value to customers. Marketing students develop in-depth knowledge on identifying, attracting, evaluating, and retaining customers. They evaluate marketing alternatives and commit to a course of action, using financial, organizational, environmental, and ethical criteria to guide decision-making. The marketing curriculum requires students to use information technology tools for customer research and in the evaluation of strategic performance. All majors will declare a concentration in either Business-to-Business or Business-to-Consumer marketing.

== Recognition ==
The College of Business ranked 11th among public institutions and 29th among all business schools by Business Week in 2013. JMU ranked third among public schools in the country and fourth among all public undergraduate business schools in the country for return on investment, according to BusinessWeek Magazine. JMU's Master of Accounting Program recently ranked as the top passing rate on the CPA exam in the United States.

== Student organizations ==
The College of Business is home to the Madison Investment Fund, a student-managed investment fund. The top Value Equity Fund at the RISE Symposium in 2004, the Madison Investment Fund actively manages a portion of the university's endowment. Other affiliated organizations include Phi Gamma Nu, Phi Chi Theta, Alpha Kappa Psi, Delta Sigma Pi, Beta Alpha Psi, Madison Marketing Association, Net Impact, Pi Sigma Epsilon, and Students in Free Enterprise.
