= Joint Force Command Norfolk =

NATO multinational naval formation/command

Joint Force Command Norfolk (JFC-NF)
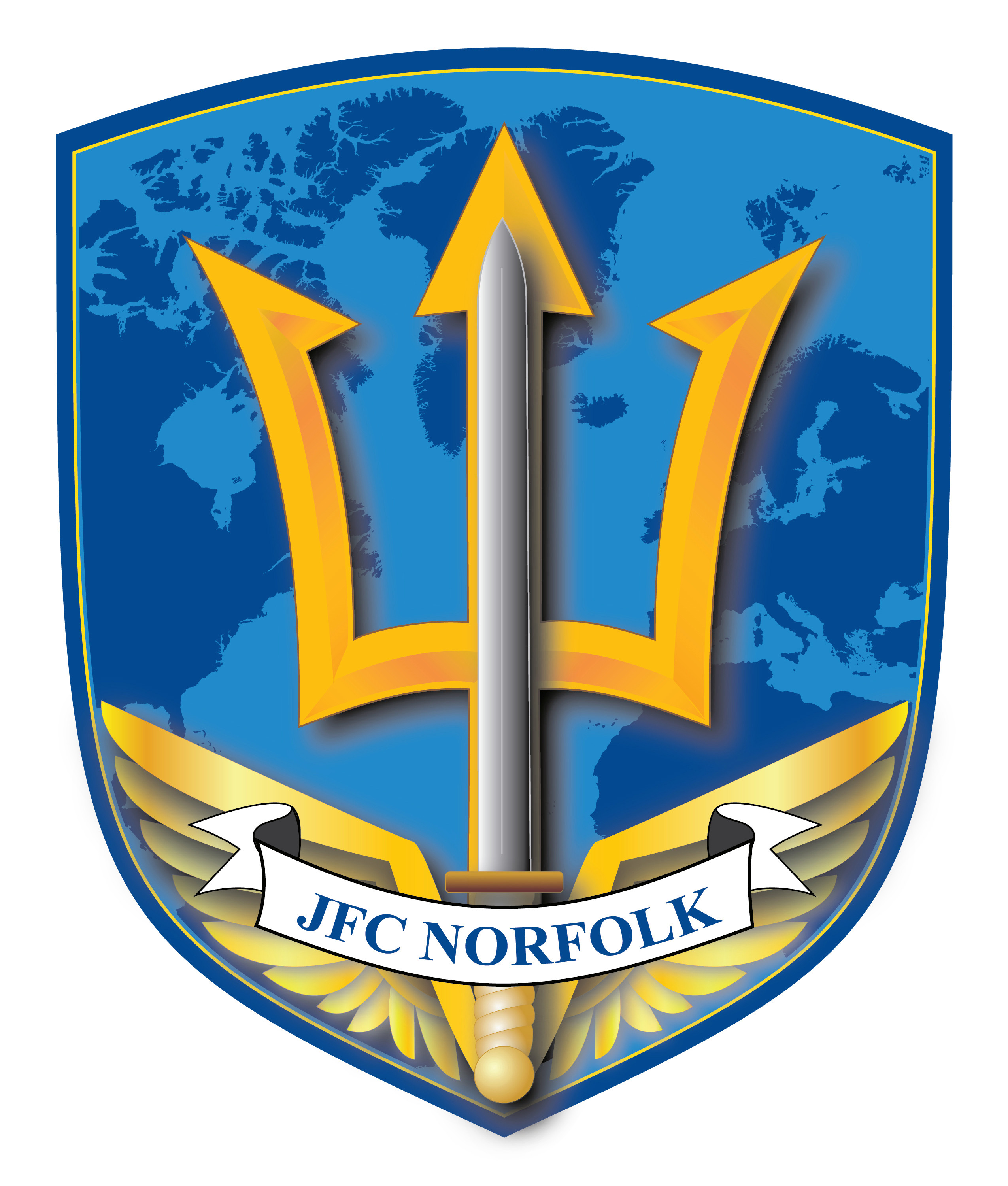
- Coat of arms
- Founded: 2018
- Part of: Allied Command Operations
- Headquarters: Norfolk, Virginia, United States
- Website: jfcnorfolk.nato.int

Commanders
- Current commander: General Nick Perry; British Army
- Deputy Commander: Vice Admiral James Morley; Royal Navy
- Chief of Staff: LTG Dirk Faust; German Army

The Joint Force Command - Norfolk (abbr. JFC-NF) is a joint operational level command part of the NATO Military Command Structure under Allied Command Operations. Its headquarters is located in Norfolk, Virginia, United States. It is the functional successor to Allied Command Atlantic, which was disbanded in 2002.

== Background ==
In late 2017-early 2018, NATO approved two new commands, a rear area transit command which was finally announced as the Joint Support and Enabling Command, to be located at Ulm, Germany, and a new command for the Atlantic. Pentagon spokesman Johnny Michael remarked that "NATO is refocusing on the Atlantic in recognition of the great power competition prompted by a resurgent Russia."

In March 2018 Chair of the Military Committee General Petr Pavel announced that the new Atlantic command would become part of the NATO Command Structure at the level of a Joint Force Command, similar to the two that exist at Brunssum and Naples. On 7 June 2018 the Secretary-General said the new JFC would have its headquarters in Norfolk, Virginia, in the United States. The name was confirmed as Joint Force Command Norfolk at the NATO Summit in July. It was to be commanded by the Vice Admiral who commands the United States Second Fleet.

== History ==
The command was established due to rising Russian threats, making Atlantic sea lines of communication more important. Its counterpart 2nd Fleet was established, because the United States Navy "needed a commander to direct sustained combat operations in the Atlantic". In January 2019, U.S. Navy releases said the command would aim to work seamlessly with allies and NATO partners in all domains and to provide awareness and synchronization with allies, while ensuring readiness and contributing to NATO objectives and core tasks. In this role, the command would contribute to enhance NATO's warfighting capability. It was formally activated by NATO's North Atlantic Council on 26 July 2019.

Vice Admiral Andrew L. Lewis, USN was appointed as the first commander, who also commands the recently re-established United States Second Fleet also headquartered in Norfolk, Virginia. The Deputy Commander is from the Royal Navy, the Chief of Staff position will alternate between a German and a Spanish officer, the operations officer is Norwegian, the plans officer is French and the support officer is Danish.

The command was declared at Initial operating capability (IOC) on 17 September 2020 at 1430 Central European Time at its headquarters, Naval Support Activity Hampton Roads. A ceremony took place on 15 July 2021 aboard the USS Kearsarge (LHD-3) to declare JFC Norfolk's full operational capability.

On 23 June 2021, U.S. Secretary of Defense Lloyd J. Austin III announced that President Joe Biden has nominated Rear Adm. Daniel W. Dwyer for the rank of vice admiral and assignment as Commander, Second Fleet/Commander, Joint Forces Command Norfolk. On 15 July 2021 Vice Admiral Lewis announced that NATO Joint Forces Command Norfolk (JFC-NF) is at Full Operational Capability (FOC). Dwyer assumed command from Lewis on 20 August 2020. In early 2024 Admiral Dwyer was replaced by Admiral Douglas G. Perry.

The previous deputy commander was Rear Admiral Andrew Betton, Royal Navy.

In February 2026, it was leaked, and subsequently announced by NATO that it would transfer the control of JFC Norfolk from the United States to the United Kingdom.

On 7 July 2026, the British Government announced that Lieutenant General Nick Perry DSO MBE will take up the post of Commander Joint Force Command Norfolk in September 2026, the first British officer to be appointed to the role. The change from a naval officer to an army officer reflects the new area of responsibility and task to defend Finland, Sweden, and Norway.

=== Area of responsibility ===
As of 2025, JFC Norfolk's area of responsibility includes:

- Denmark
- Finland
- Iceland
- Norway
- Sweden
- United Kingdom
- United States
