= Andrew L. Lewis (admiral) =

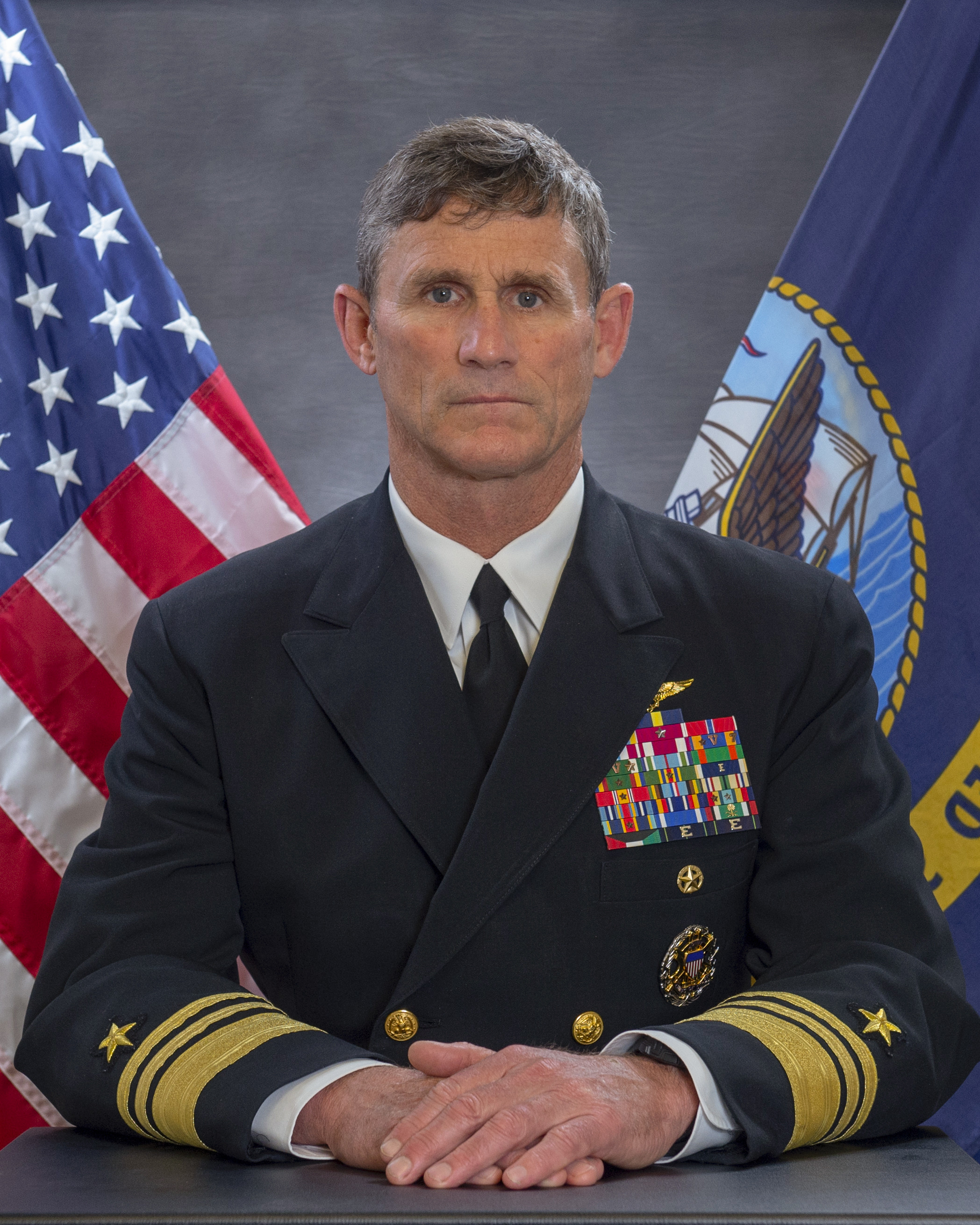
- Born: 1963 (age 62–63)
- Military career
- Allegiance: United States
- Branch: United States Navy
- Service years: 1985–2021
- Rank: Vice Admiral
- Nickname: "Woody"
- Commands: United States Second Fleet; Carrier Strike Group 12; Naval Strike and Air Warfare Center; Carrier Air Wing Three; Strike Fighter Squadron 106; Strike Fighter Squadron 15; USS Theodore Roosevelt
- Conflicts: Gulf War; Bosnian War; War in Afghanistan; Iraq War
- Awards: Navy Distinguished Service Medal; Defense Superior Service Medal (2); Legion of Merit (6); Bronze Star Medal

Andrew Lloyd Lewis (born 1963) is a retired admiral in the United States Navy who last served as the commander of the United States Second Fleet and NATO Joint Force Command for the Atlantic. Lewis previously served as the Deputy Chief of Naval Operations for Operations, Plans and Strategy. He took command of the United States Second Fleet upon its reestablishment on August 24, 2018.

== Early life and education ==
Lewis was raised in Los Altos, California, and attended the United States Naval Academy where he received his commission after graduation in 1985. Lewis was designated a naval aviator in 1987 and has also attended the Air Command and Staff College, the Armed Forces Staff College, and holds a master's degree in military history from the University of Alabama.

== Career ==
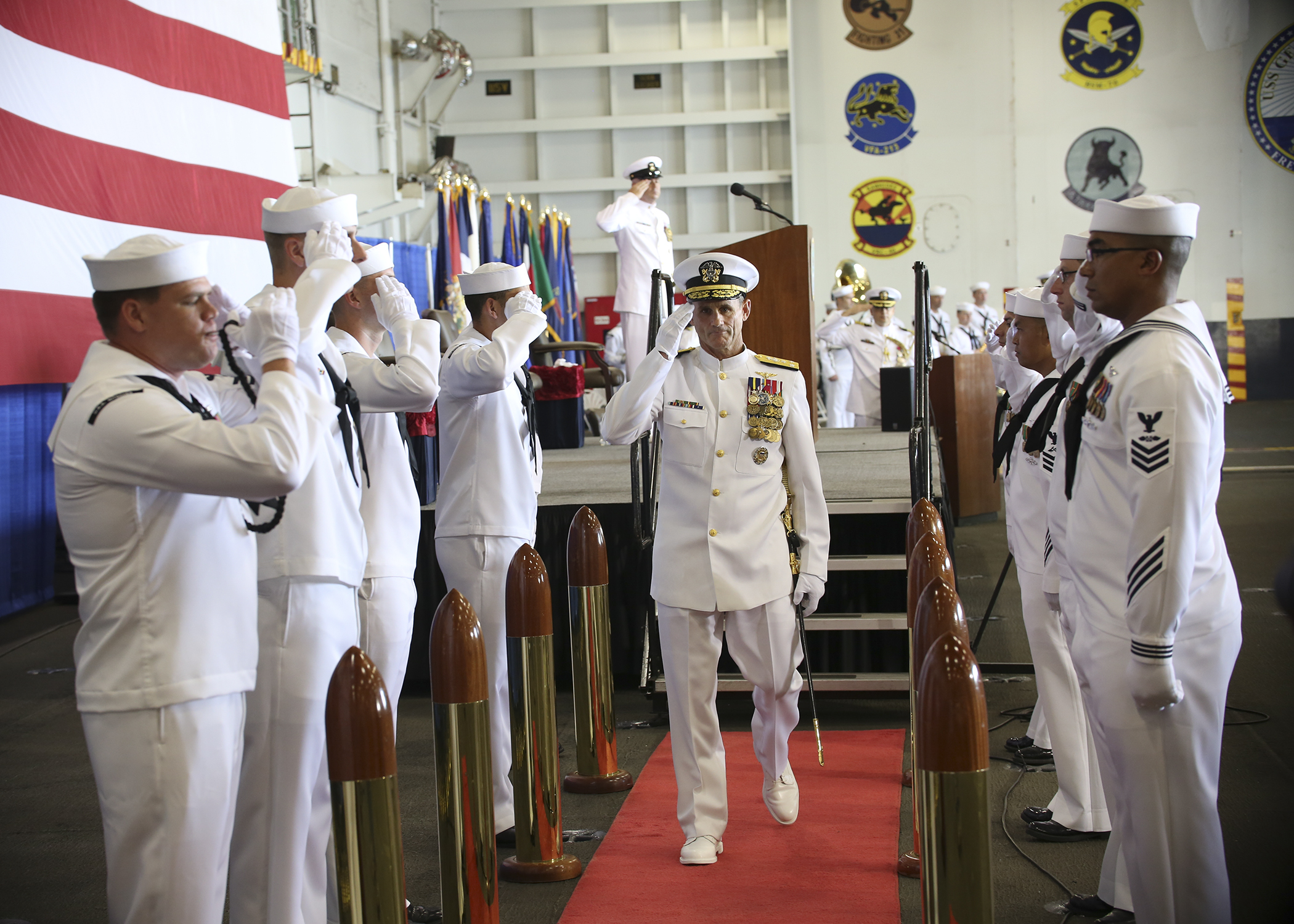
Lewis after assuming command of U.S. 2nd Fleet aboard the aircraft carrier USS George H.W. Bush on August 24, 2018.

During his career, Lewis has served in various roles in the United States Navy including commanding Carrier Strike Group 12, the Naval Strike and Air Warfare Center, Carrier Air Wing Three, Strike Fighter Squadron 106, Strike Fighter Squadron 15, and USS Theodore Roosevelt. He has also served as an instructor pilot as well as an exchange officer with the Royal Navy aboard HMS Invincible. Lewis has flown over 100 combat missions with over 5,300 flights hours in both the A-7 Corsair II and the F/A-18 Hornet. He has also held foreign postings in Qatar at Al Udeid Air Base and in Bahrain at United States Naval Forces Central Command.

Prior to being promoted to vice admiral in 2017, Lewis served as the vice director of operations for the Joint Staff. He has also served as vice director for operations and director of fleet training at Fleet Forces Command. Lewis became Deputy Chief of Naval Operations for Operations, Plans and Strategy in August 2017 and was nominated to take command of the newly reestablished Second Fleet on June 12, 2018. Lewis was confirmed on June 18, 2018 and assumed command of the Second Fleet upon its formal reactivation on August 24, 2018.

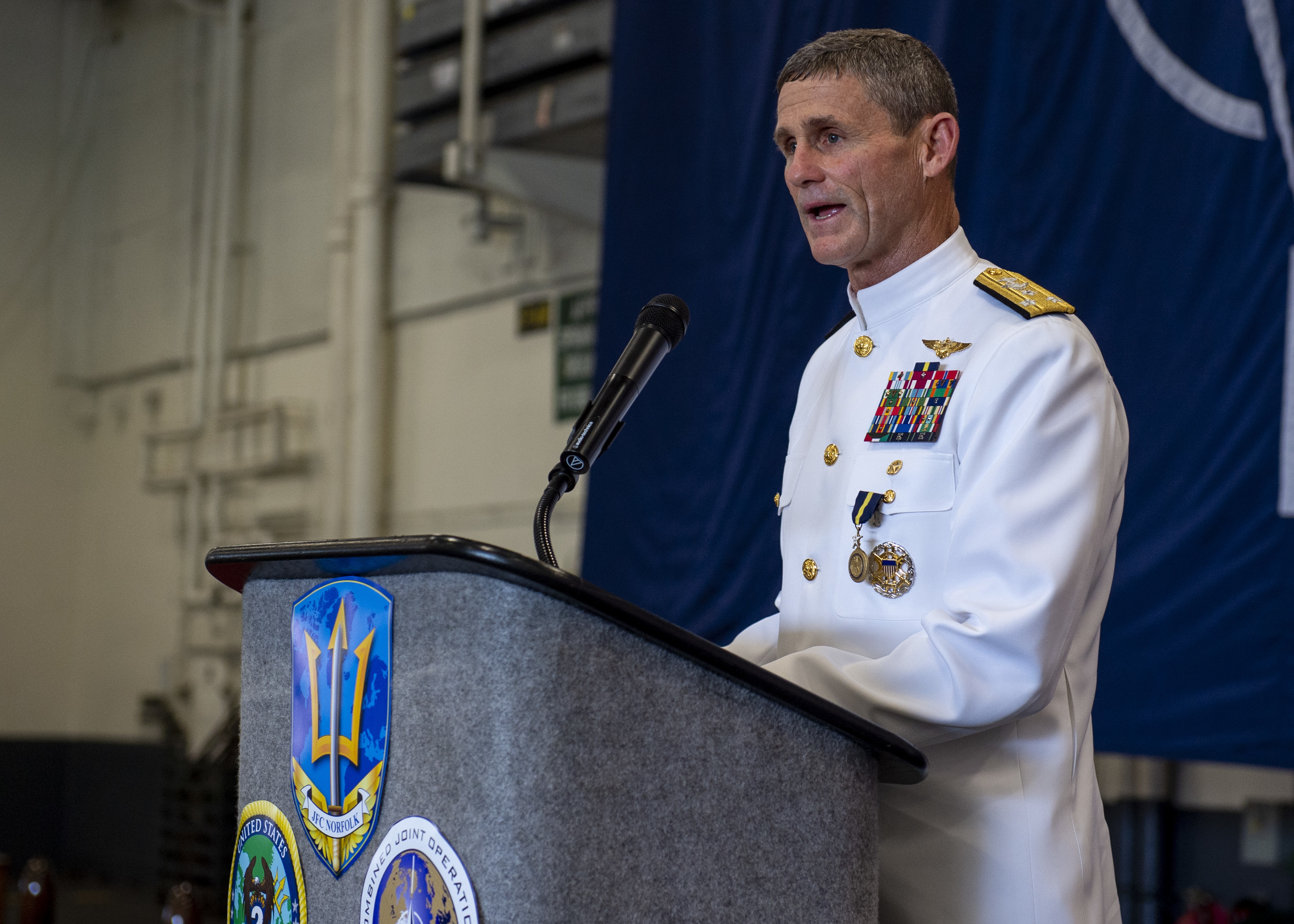
Outgoing commander, Vice Adm. Lewis, speaks during the Second Fleet change of command ceremony on August 20, 2021.

All of Lewis's operational command tours have been centered on the United States East Coast and in late 2018 he assumed command of the newly created NATO Joint Force Command Norfolk based in Norfolk, Virginia which is dual-hatted with the Second Fleet. With the announcement of Daniel W. Dwyer to succeed him as Second Fleet commander in June 2021, Lewis is expected to retire. He relinquished command of Second Fleet to Dwyer on August 20, 2021.

== Awards and decorations ==
Since receiving his commission, Lewis has received the Navy Distinguished Service Medal, the Defense Superior Service Medal with oak leaf cluster, the Legion of Merit (six awards), the Bronze Star Medal, the Defense Meritorious Service Medal, the Meritorious Service Medal, the Air Medal (seven Strike Flight and four Individual with Combat "V"), the Navy and Marine Corps Commendation Medal (three awards, two with Combat "V"), and the Navy and Marine Corps Achievement Medal, among a number of other decorations.

In 1996, Lewis was named the Naval Air Forces Pacific Pilot of the Year.

== Works ==
- The Revolt of the Admirals, Air Command and Staff College, Maxwell Air Force Base, April 1998.

Military offices
Preceded by Kevin J. Kovacich	Commander of Carrier Strike Group 12; 2014-2015	Succeeded by Roy J. Kelley
Preceded by Sinclair Harris	Vice Director for Operations of the Joint Staff; 2015-2017	Succeeded by James J. Malloy
Preceded by Kevin M. Donegan	Deputy Chief of Naval Operations for Operations, Plans and Strategy; 2017-2018	Succeeded by James J. Malloy
Preceded by Daniel Holloway	Commander of the United States Second Fleet; 2018–present	Succeeded by Daniel W. Dwyer
New title	Commander of Joint Force Command Norfolk; 2018-present	Succeeded by Daniel W. Dwyer
