= United States Second Fleet =

Numbered fleet of the United States Navy

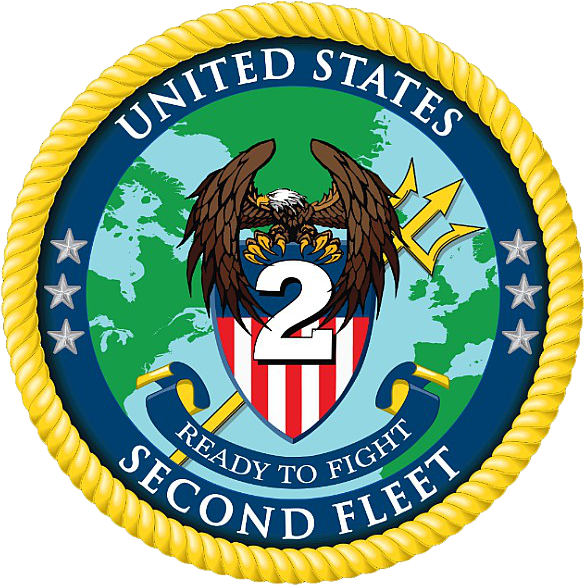
- Active: February 1950 – 30 September 2011, 24 August 2018 – present
- Country: United States
- Branch: United States Navy
- Type: Fleet
- Role: Combat & Maritime Operations, Security Cooperation Activities, and Humanitarian Assistance/Disaster Response
- Part of: U.S. Fleet Forces Command (COMUSFLTCOM)
- Garrison/HQ: Naval Support Activity Hampton Roads, Virginia, U.S.
- Website: c2f.usff.navy.mil

Commanders
- Commander: VADM Douglas G. Perry
- Deputy Commander: Vacant
- Vice Commander: RADM David Mazur (RCN)
- Command Master Chief: CMDCM Jason S. Avin

The United States Second Fleet is a numbered fleet in the United States Navy responsible for operations in the East Coast and North Atlantic Ocean. Established after World War II, Second Fleet was deactivated in 2011, when the United States government believed that Russia's military threat had diminished, and reestablished in 2018 amid renewed tensions between NATO and Russia.

Second Fleet's area of responsibility includes about 6,700,000 square miles (17,000,000 km^{2}) of the Atlantic Ocean from the North Pole to the Caribbean and from the shores of the United States to the middle of the Atlantic Ocean. Second Fleet's United States West Coast counterpart was United States First Fleet from the immediate post-World War II years until 1973, and United States Third Fleet from 1973.

In 2011, Second Fleet oversaw about 126 ships, 4,500 aircraft, and 90,000 personnel homeported at U.S. Navy installations along the United States East Coast.

== Mission ==
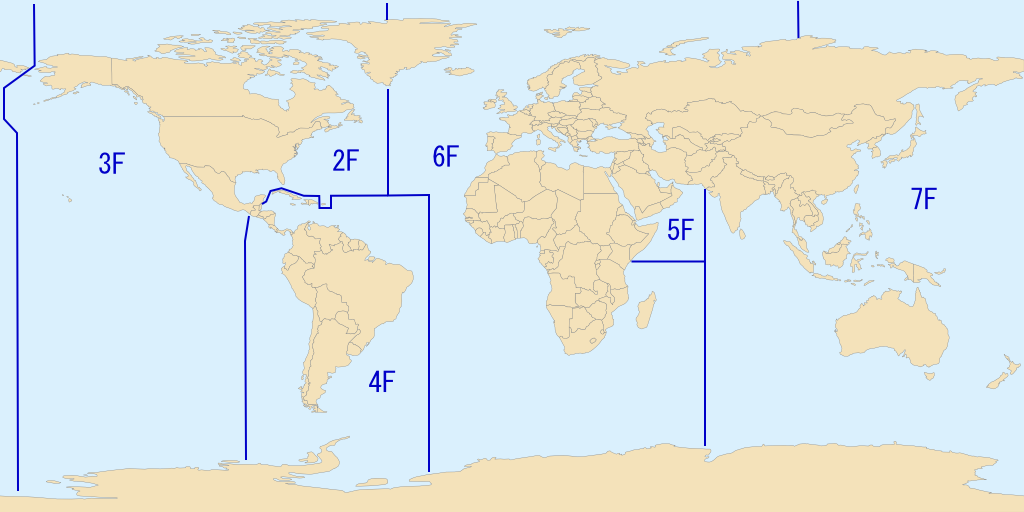
Area of responsibility (Second Fleet) 2009

As of 2008, the Commander, Second Fleet (COMSECONDFLT), under the Commander, U.S. Fleet Forces Command (CUSFFC), was also designated as Commander, Task Force 20. CTF-20 planned for, and when directed, conducted battle force operations in the Atlantic command in support of designated unified or allied commanders. CTF-20 directed movements and exercised operational control of USFFC assigned units to carry out scheduled ocean transits and other special operations as directed, in order to maximize fleet operational readiness to respond to contingencies in the Atlantic command area of operations. In order to command and control its forces, CTF-20 maintained a Joint Maritime Operations Center at its Maritime Headquarters, which was officially said to offer a new approach to command and control for fleet commanders.

Until 2005, COMSECONDFLT had a permanent assignment with NATO's Supreme Allied Commander Atlantic's (SACLANT) chain of command, as the Commander Striking Fleet Atlantic (COMSTRIKFLTLANT). COMSTRIKFLTLANT commanded a multinational force whose primary mission was to deter aggression and to protect NATO's Atlantic interests. Striking Fleet Atlantic was tasked with ensuring the integrity of NATO's sea lines of communication. STRIKFLTLANT was deactivated in a ceremony to be held on USS Iwo Jima (LHD-7) on 24 June 2005, being replaced by the Combined Joint Operations from the Sea Center of Excellence located at the Second Fleet headquarters.

=== Training ===
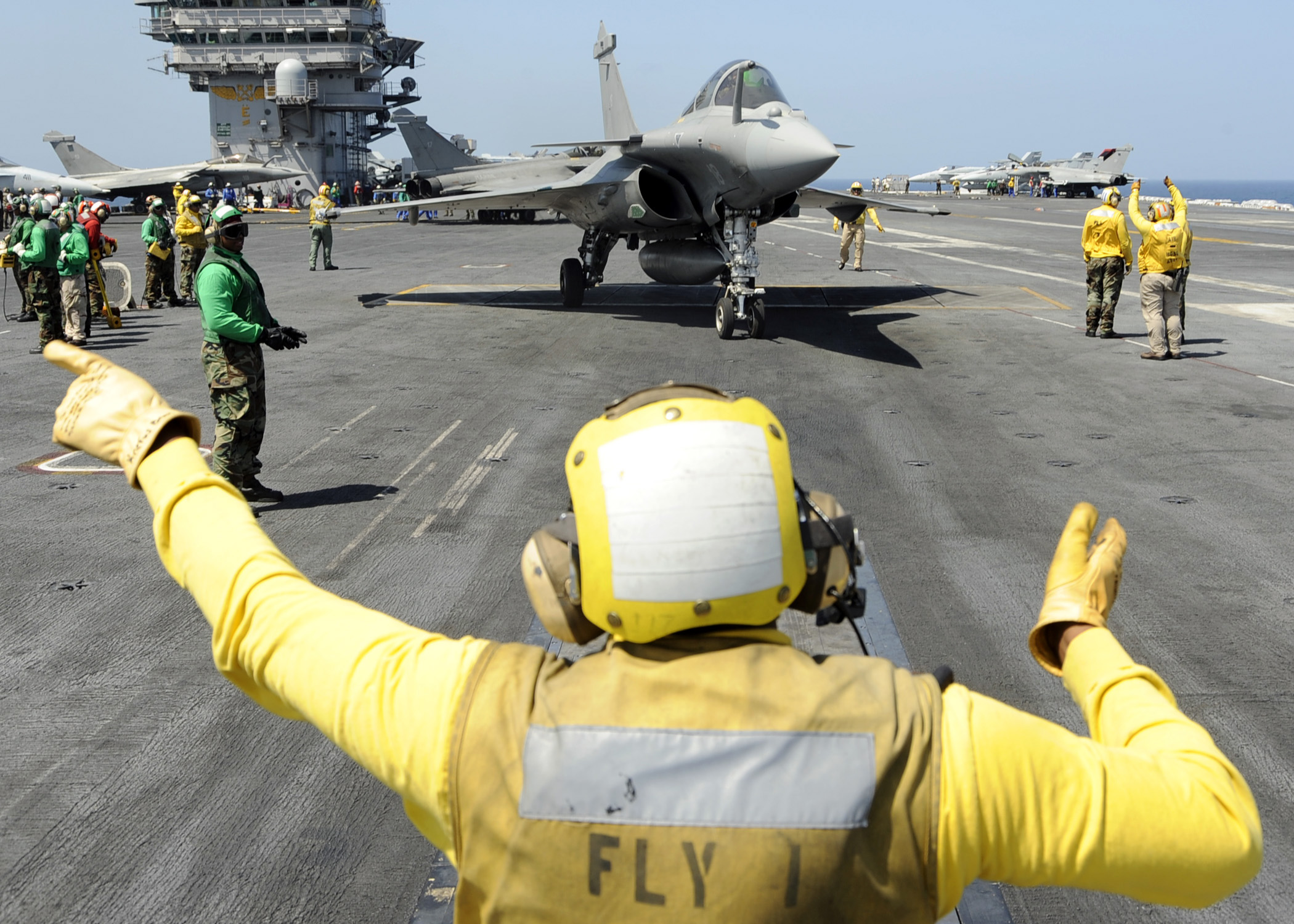
Rafale fighter aircraft onboard Theodore Roosevelt (20 July 2008)

During its existence, Second Fleet was responsible for training and certifying Atlantic Fleet units for forward deployment to other numbered fleets, primarily U.S. Fourth Fleet, U.S. Fifth Fleet, and U.S. Sixth Fleet. Second Fleet's main training and certification venues were the Composite Unit Training Exercise (COMTUEX) and Joint Task Force Exercise (JTFEX), conducted off the eastern U.S. coast from Virginia to Florida. These exercises serve as a ready-for-deployment certification events for Carrier Strike Groups, Amphibious ready groups, as well as independently deploying units.

=== Joint Task Force 120 ===
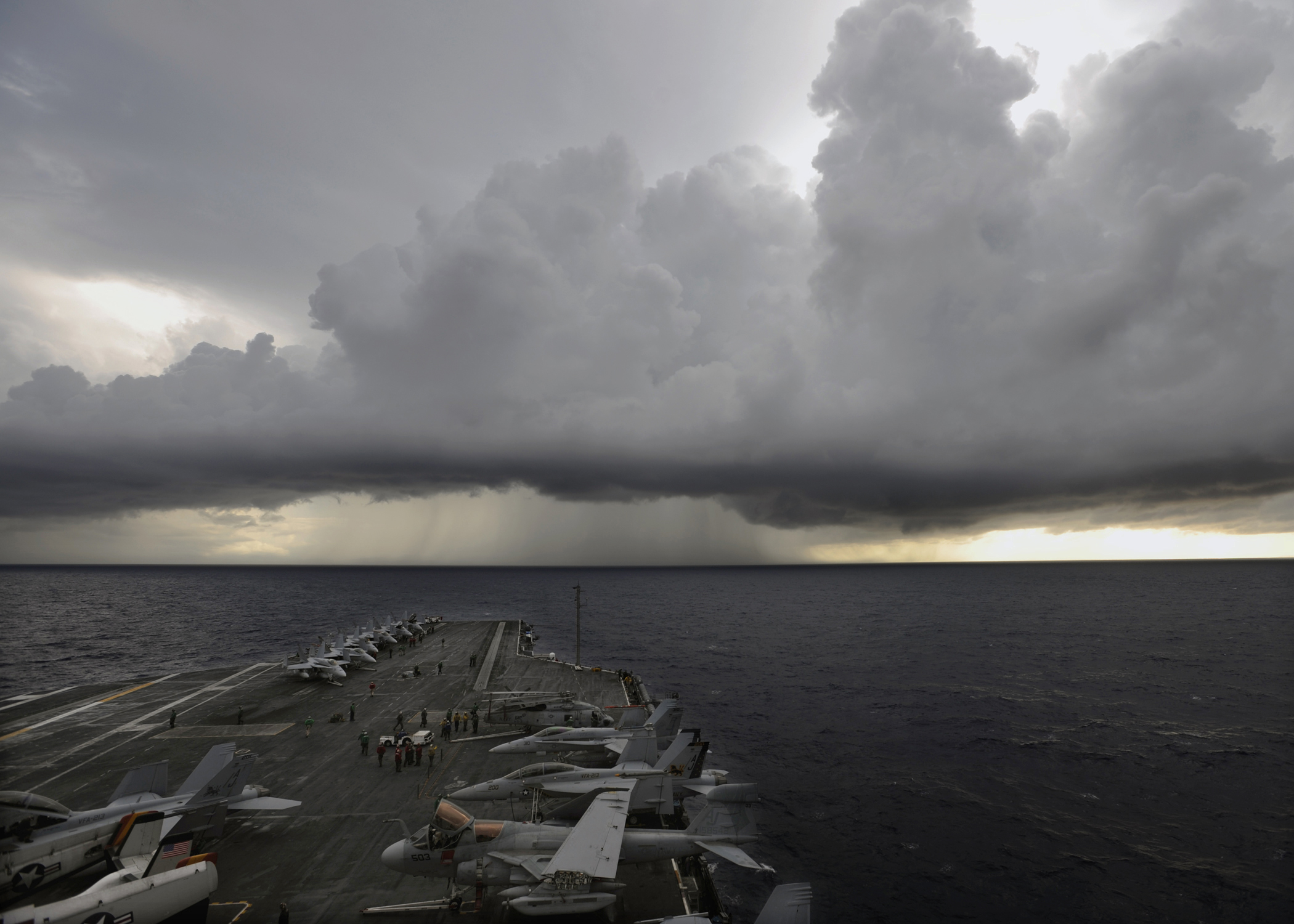
Flight ops (24 July 2008)

In times of crisis and during certain exercises, Second Fleet became the Commander, Joint Task Force 120. This joint task force consists of elements of the Atlantic Fleet, U.S. Army quick reaction airborne and air assault units, U.S. Air Force aircraft and support personnel, U.S. Marine Corps amphibious forces, and at times, designated units of the United States Coast Guard. When activated, Joint Task Force 120 was tasked to execute a variety of contingency missions.

== Subordinate Task Forces ==
Commander Second Fleet oversaw several subordinate task forces, which were activated as needed.

Task Force Name	Task Force Type
Task Force 20	Battle Force
Task Force 21	Patrol Reconnaissance Force
Task Force 22	Amphibious Force
Task Force 23	Logistics
Task Force 24	ASW Force
Task Force 25	Mine Warfare
Task Force 26	Expeditionary (Amphibious in 2006)
Task Force 27	Surface Warfare
Task Force 28	Commander Strike Force Training Atlantic
CTF-29	Land

Additionally, Commander, Second Fleet was the immediate superior to a number of Carrier Strike Groups, Expeditionary Strike Group 2, Commander Strike Force Training Atlantic, as well as the Standing Navy Command Element (COMSTANDNAV CE), a deployable command element that has served multiple rotations as the headquarters of Combined Joint Task Force-Horn of Africa.

In October 1996 COMSECONDFLT created Task Force 28, consisting of independent deployers operating in both the Caribbean Sea and Eastern Pacific. Commander, Western Hemisphere Group was assigned as Commander Task Force 28 (CTF 28). This arrangement assigned COMWESTHEMGRU the operational control (OPCON) of these Second Fleet destroyers.

== History ==
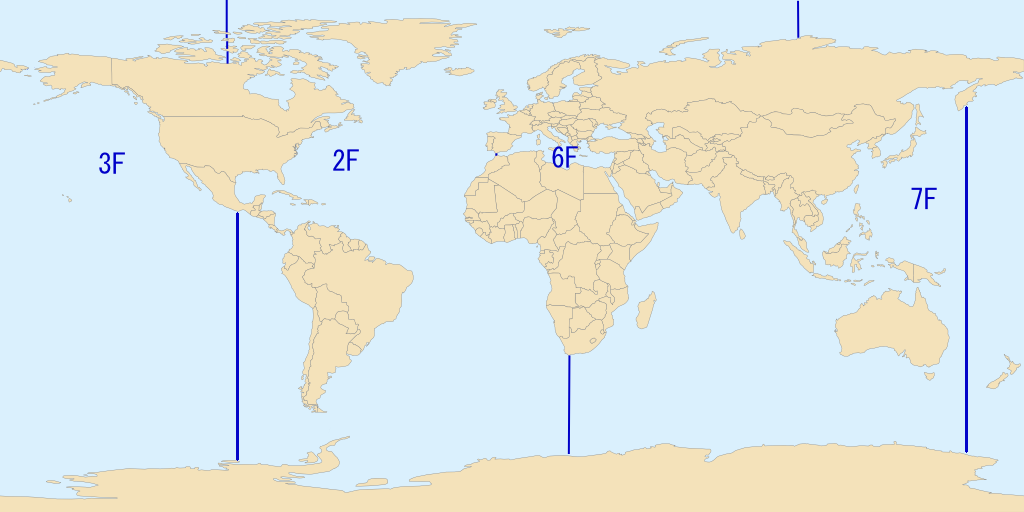
Area of responsibility (2F) 1980s

The U.S. Second Fleet traces its origin to the reorganization of the Navy following World War II in December 1945 and the formation of the United States Eighth Fleet under the command of Vice Admiral Marc A. Mitscher. In January 1947, Eighth Fleet was renamed Second Task Fleet. Three years later, in February 1950, the command was redesignated U.S. Second Fleet. Second Fleet's area of responsibility included the Atlantic coast of South America and part of the west coast of Central America.

=== Cuban Quarantine ===
In October 1962, President John F. Kennedy called on Second Fleet to establish quarantine during the Cuban Missile Crisis. For more than a month, Second Fleet units operated northeast of the island, intercepting and inspecting dozens of ships for contraband.

Control of the quarantine force was assigned to the Commander of the Second Fleet, Vice Admiral Alfred G. Ward, who organized Task Force 136 for this purpose. Task Force 136 included the anti-submarine warfare carrier USS Essex (CVS-9). Effective deployment constituted a mammoth task to be accomplished in minimum time. To prevent future difficulties, plans had to be developed, ship captains briefed, supply ships dispatched, and thousands of details checked. Other Navy and Marine forces faced similar tough schedules. Marines, if not already engaged in landing exercises, were loaded on amphibious ships and ordered to sea. At the Guantanamo Bay Naval Base, dependents were evacuated to the United States on 22 October, and Marine units were shipped by air and sea to reinforce the base. Task Force 135, including the carrier USS Enterprise, was sent to the south of Cuba, ready to join in the defense of the Guantanamo Bay base if needed. The carrier USS Independence and the supporting ships of Carrier Division Six stood by to provide additional support. Antisubmarine forces were redeployed to cover the quarantine operations. An intensive air surveillance of the Atlantic was initiated, keeping track of the 2,000 commercial ships usually in the area; regular and reserve Navy aircraft were joined in this search by SAC bombers.

Major exercises the fleet participated in during the Cold War included Exercise Mariner, Operation Strikeback in 1957, the maritime component of Exercise Reforger, and Northern Wedding.

From 9 to 12 February 1978, Task Group 21.6 (USS Inchon and USS Spruance) visited Monrovia in Liberia.

=== 1980s and 1990s ===
In 1983, President Ronald Reagan ordered the Second Fleet to the Caribbean to lead the invasion of Grenada during Operation Urgent Fury. Leading joint forces, Vice Admiral Joseph Metcalf, III, COMSECONDFLT, became Commander, Joint Task Force 120 (CJTF 120), and commanded units from the Air Force, Army, Navy, and the Marine Corps.

The amphibious force for the operation was made up of Amphibious Squadron 4 (the amphibious assault ship USS Guam, the amphibious transport dock USS Trenton, the dock landing ship USS Fort Snelling, and the tank landing ships USS Manitowoc and USS Barnstable County) and the 22nd Marine Amphibious Unit, built around 2nd Battalion, 8th Marines. Vice Admiral Metcalf assigned to the amphibious force, designated Task Force 124, the mission of seizing the Pearls Airport and the port of Grenville, and of neutralizing any opposing forces in the area. Simultaneously, Army Rangers (Task Force 121)— together with elements of the 82d Airborne Division (Task Force 123)— would secure points at the southern end of the island, including the nearly completed jet airfield under construction near Point Salines. Task Group 20.5, a carrier battle group build around USS Independence (CV-62) and Air Force elements would support the ground forces.

Before the beginning of the Gulf War in January 1991, Second Fleet trained more than half of the Navy ships deployed to Southwest Asia.

=== 21st century ===
On 22 February 2005/24 June 2005, with the establishment of Allied Command Transformation, and in the total absence of the Soviet threat that had prompted its creation, the Striking Fleet Atlantic nucleus was disbanded. It was replaced in 2006 by the Combined Joint Operations from the Sea Center of Excellence.

On 1 July 2008, the Navy re-established the United States Fourth Fleet, based at Naval Station Mayport in Jacksonville, Florida, which then assumed responsibility for U.S. Navy ships, aircraft and submarines operating in the Caribbean Sea and the waters of Central and South America.

In the aftermath of the 2010 Haiti earthquake, Second Fleet dispatched 17 ships, 48 helicopters, 12 fixed-wing aircraft and over 10,000 sailors and Marines in support of Humanitarian Assistance/Disaster Response. Second Fleet units conducted 336 air deliveries, delivered 32,400 US gallons (123,000 L; 27,000 imp gal) of water, 111,082 meals and 9,000 lb (4,100 kg) of medical supplies. Hospital ship USNS Comfort, as well as survey vessels, ferries, elements of the Maritime Prepositioning ship and underway replenishment fleets, and a further three amphibious operations ships also participated.

During the evacuation of Hurricane Irene in August 2011, the fleet evacuated to the safety of the open ocean.

==== Disestablishment ====
On 21 August 2010, it was reported that Secretary Robert Gates was considering disestablishing Second Fleet.

On 6 January 2011, it was reported via a DoD news article that the Navy would disestablish Second Fleet in order to "use those savings and more to fund additional ships". The fleet was officially dissolved in a ceremony at Norfolk on 30 September 2011.

Second Fleet's responsibilities and its additional title of Commander, Task Force 20, were transferred to the re-organized United States Fleet Forces Command, as was the post of CJOS COE.

=== Reestablishment ===
On 4 May 2018, Admiral Chris Grady announced the reestablishment of the Second Fleet. Pentagon spokesman Johnny Michael said, "NATO is refocusing on the Atlantic in recognition of the great power competition prompted by a resurgent Russia". It was reestablished on 24 August 2018, with Vice Admiral Andrew "Woody" Lewis in command.

Second Fleet was scheduled to resume operations officially on 1 July 2018, initially with a staff of 15 personnel (11 officers and four enlisted personnel), although plans call for its work force to expand to 256 (85 officers, 164 enlisted personnel, and seven civilians). It will exercise operational and administrative authorities over assigned ships, aircraft, and landing forces on the United States East Coast and in the northern Atlantic Ocean, as well as plan and conduct maritime, joint, and combined operations and train, certify and provide maritime forces to respond to global contingencies. Commander, Second Fleet will report to United States Fleet Forces Command. Vice Admiral Andrew L. Lewis was confirmed on 18 June 2018 as Commander, U.S. 2nd Fleet. Second Fleet was reactivated in Norfolk on 1 July 2018 and received formal establishment on 24 August 2018. Commander Second Fleet will be dual-hatted as the Commander for Joint Force Command for the Atlantic that will report to the Supreme Allied Commander Europe. This Joint Forces Command is formally known as Joint Force Command Norfolk.

Rear Adm. Doug Perry, director of joint and fleet operations at Fleet Forces Command, was quoted in early November 2018 that the fleet was reformed because "the Navy needed a commander to direct sustained combat operations in the Atlantic". Perry said it sends the message that "we understand we are in a battle for the Atlantic, and we will contest it." The Navy declared 2nd Fleet fully operational on 31 December 2019.

During Exercise Steadfast Defender '21, Canadian Rear Admiral Steve Waddell, vice commander, Second Fleet, served as commander of C2F's forward-deployed Task Force 20.

On May 26, 2021, the U.S. Navy announced that Rear Admiral (lower half) Brian L. Davies would be assigned additional duties as deputy commander, Second Fleet, Norfolk, Virginia. He was to retain all currently assigned duties as Commander, Submarine Group 2, Norfolk, Virginia.
