= Navy "E" Ribbon =

US Navy award

- Navy "E" Ribbon, from top to bottom. first through fourth and final awards
- Awarded for: Battle efficiency (cited ships and units)
- Presented by: the Department of the Navy
- Eligibility: Military Unit
- Status: Currently awarded
- Established: 31 March 1976 (Secretary of the Navy letter ser 210), effective on or after 1 July 1974
- First award: 1976

Precedence
- Next (higher): Army: Superior Unit Award; Naval Service: Meritorious Unit Commendations; Air and Space Forces: Air and Space Outstanding Unit Award; Coast Guard: Meritorious Team Commendation
- Equivalent: Air and Space Forces: Air and Space Organizational Excellence Award; Coast Guard: Coast Guard "E" Ribbon
- Next (lower): Prisoner of War Medal

The Navy "E" Ribbon or Battle Efficiency Ribbon (informally the Battle "E" ribbon) was authorized on March 31, 1976, by Secretary of the Navy J. William Middendorf as a unit award for battle efficiency competition. The service ribbon replaced the "E" patch previously sewn on the right sleeve of the enlisted naval uniform for rates/pay grades E-1 through E-6.

== History ==
The Navy "E" Ribbon was designed by AZ3 Cynthia L. Crider in 1973. Her design and recommendation were approved by the Secretary of the Navy after three years, and the ribbon was subsequently created by the Department of the Army, which has the final approval for the design and colors of all ribbons and medals in the U.S. military. Serving with Carrier Airborne Early Warning Squadron 88 (VAW-88), a Naval Air Reserve E-2 Hawkeye squadron at NAS North Island, California, Petty Officer Crider designed the ribbon after her squadron won the "E" award for the second time in a row, but with the new uniform change could not wear anything on their uniforms to show they had been awarded the Navy "E" two consecutive times.

== Award criteria ==
The Navy "E" Ribbon denotes the wearer was on permanent duty aboard a U.S. Navy ship or in a unit that won a battle efficiency competition after July 1, 1974. United States Marine Corps members assigned as ship's company are eligible on the same basis as Navy personnel; Marine Corps (and other sister-Service) personnel assigned to embarked units, such as aircraft squadrons, battalion landing teams, and Marine Expeditionary Units (MEU) are not eligible to wear the ribbon.

The Navy "E" Ribbon does not have a corresponding medal, meaning that when in full dress uniform (when medals are worn), the ribbon is placed above the right breast pocket of the uniform instead of the left. However, when in standard uniform (no medals are worn), the ribbon is placed above the left breast pocket, along with all other citations and awards.

The United States Coast Guard's equivalent of the Navy "E" Ribbon is the Coast Guard "E" Ribbon.

== Navy "E" device ==
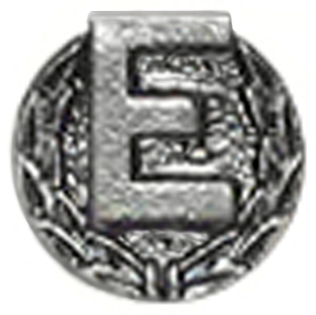
Silver "E" and wreathed "E" devices

The first, second, and third award of the Navy "E" (Battle "E") are denoted by a silver 3/16 inch letter "E" device on the Navy "E" Ribbon for each award. When a sailor or Marine receives a fourth Navy "E" award, a silver wreathed letter "E" replaces the three "E" devices on the ribbon. The wreathed "E" effectively "closes out" the award ribbon — no further "E" devices are authorized for display to denote five or more awards of the Navy "E". Multiple "E" ribbon attachments are placed in a symmetrical, horizontal line in the center of the ribbon.

== See also ==
- Awards and decorations of the United States military
- Army-Navy "E" Award
- Battle Effectiveness Award
- Marksmanship Device
- United States military award devices
