= Dick H. Guinn =

United States Navy admiral

Dick Henry Guinn
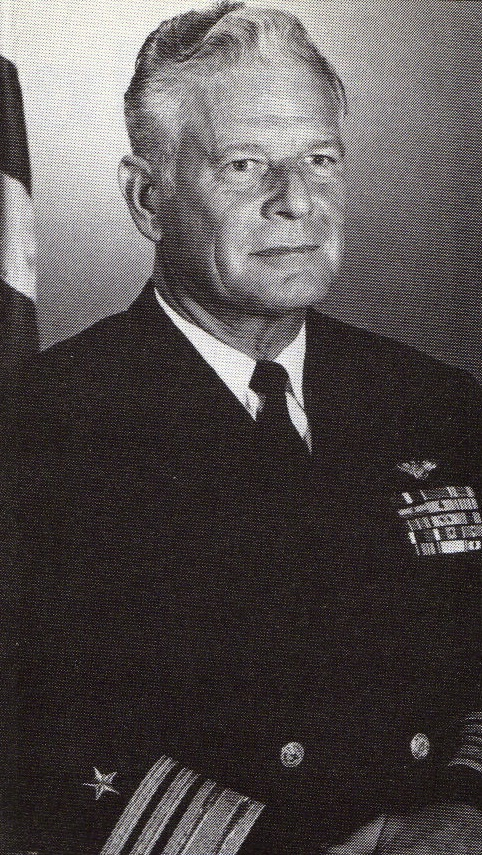
- VADM Dick H. Guinn, USN
- Born: March 27, 1918; Palestine, Texas, U.S.
- Died: August 26, 1980 (aged 62); Pensacola, Florida, U.S.
- Burial place: Barrancas National Cemetery
- Military career
- Allegiance: United States
- Branch: United States Navy
- Service years: 1941–1972
- Rank: Vice admiral
- Service number: 0-100304
- Commands: Chief of Naval Personnel; Carrier Division 4 USS Forrestal; USS Rigel; Carrier Air Group 6 Composite Squadron 3
- Conflicts: World War II: Battle of the Atlantic; Battle of Okinawa; Attacks on Kure; Korean War
- Awards: Navy Cross; Distinguished Service Medal; Legion of Merit; Air Medal (2)

Dick Henry Guinn (March 27, 1918 – August 26, 1980) was a highly decorated officer in the United States Navy with the rank of vice admiral. A Naval Academy graduate, he distinguished himself as pilot and flight leader of Fighter Squadron 94 during the sinking of Japanese cruiser Aoba in July 1945, for which he received the Navy Cross, the United States military's second-highest decoration awarded for valor in combat.

He rose to the flag rank and commanded Bureau of Naval Personnel and Carrier Division 4. Guinn completed his career as Deputy Chief of Naval Operations (Manpower and Naval Reserve) and Chief of Naval Personnel.

== Early career and World War II ==
Dick H. Guinn was born on March 27, 1918, in Palestine, Texas, the son of Jack Simpson and Ruby Aurelia Guinn. He graduated from the high school and entered the Texas College of Mines in El Paso, Texas, where he completed one year, before received an appointment to the United States Naval Academy at Annapolis, Maryland, in May 1937. During his time at the academy, Guinn was active in the lacrosse team and also was a member of the Musical Club.

He graduated with Bachelor of Science degree on February 7, 1941, and was commissioned ensign in the United States Navy on that date. Guinn was subsequently attached to the light cruiser USS Milwaukee and participated in the patrol cruises to Trinidad, Cape Verde Islands, and the eastern bulge of Brazil. When the United States entered the World War II, Milwaukee was located at Brooklyn Navy Yard and immediately departed for patrols in the South Atlantic. While aboard Milwaukee, Guinn was promoted to temporary rank of lieutenant junior grade on June 15, 1942, and to temporary lieutenant on December 1 that year.

Guinn remained at Milwaukee until February 1943, when he was detached from that vessel and ordered to Naval Air Station Pensacola, Florida, for flight training. He completed the training in July 1943 and was designated Naval aviator. Guinn then served as an instructor there until October 1944, when he was assigned to newly formed Fighting Squadron 94 (VF-94) at Pensacola as Navy Combat Plane and Flight Leader.

Following the period of training, VF-94 embarked for South Pacific in early 1945, where it was attached to the aircraft carrier USS Lexington in mid-June 1945. Guinn took part in the air support operations at the end of Battle of Okinawa and attack on Japanese garrisons on Wake Island, Honshu and Hokkaido. His squadron then began with the preparation for Invasion of Japan. He was decorated with Air Medal for these actions.

On July 24, 1945, Guinn led his division of eight Hellcats during the Attacks on Japanese Naval Anchorage, Kure, Honshu. He skillfully piloted his aircraft in a determined attack against Japanese cruiser Aoba docked in the harbor and despite heavy anti-aircraft fire from enemy warships and ground installations, he scored a direct hit on the fantail of the ship with a 2,000 lb bomb, which contributed to the sinking of that vessel. For this act of valor, Guinn was decorated with the Navy Cross, the United States military's second-highest decoration awarded for valor in combat.

Four days later, Guinn led his Flight of Hellcats during the attack on Oi Airfield, Honshu and scored direct hit with a heavy caliber bomb, which destroyed a large hangar. He also destroyed two aircraft on the ground by strafing and directed his flight in destroying of two other hangars by bomb and eleven parked aircraft by rockets. For this meritorious achievement, Guinn received his second Air Medal.

Following the Surrender of Japan and cancellation of the Invasion of Japan, Guinn was appointed Air Plot officer aboard the aircraft carrier USS Lexington. He also received Navy Presidential Unit Citation for merits of Lexington and all subordinated units (including his squadron) during the final stages of the War. Guinn was promoted to temporary rank of lieutenant commander retroactive to July 20, 1945.

== Postwar service ==
Guinn participated in the occupation of Japan until March 1946, when he was appointed flag secretary to commander, Naval Air Force, Pacific Fleet under Vice Admiral Alfred E. Montgomery. When admiral Montgomery assumed command of U.S. First Task Fleet in September 1946, Guinn was appointed his Flag Lieutenant and served in this capacity until June 1947, when he assumed command of Fighter Squadron 2-A.

He was attached to the staff of Commander Fleet Air, West Coast under Vice Admiral John H. Hoover in June 1948 and served as personnel officer until June of the following year, when he was transferred to Sandia Base near Albuquerque, New Mexico. The Sandia Base served was a top-secret installation, which served as the center for research, development, design, testing, and training of nuclear weapons and Guinn assumed duty as executive officer and staff operations officer on the staff, Commander Field Command, Armed Forces Special Weapons Project. While in this capacity, he was promoted to commander on January 1, 1951.

In February 1952, Guinn embarked for Korea and joined Composite Squadron 3 as Special Weapons Officer. He later served consecutively as the squadron's executive officer and commanding officer and returned to the United States in February 1954 for duty in Air Warfare Division, Office of the Chief of Naval Operations. He remained there until March 1956, when he assumed command of Carrier Air Group 6 and commanded it during the Exercise Strikeback, a major naval exercise of the North Atlantic Treaty Organization (NATO), which took place over a ten-day period in September 1957 in the North Atlantic Ocean, GIUK Gap and Norwegian Sea.

Following the exercise, Guinn joined the staff, Commander, Naval Air Forces, Atlantic Fleet under Vice Admiral William L. Rees at Norfolk Navy Yard and remained there until March 1958, when he returned to the Navy Department in Washington, D.C., for duty as head, Grade Assignment Branch, Bureau of Naval Personnel under Vice Admiral Harold P. Smith. Guinn was promoted to captain on August 1, 1958.

In July 1959, Guinn entered the National War College in Washington, D.C., and graduated in July of the following year. He subsequently joined the staff of Commander-in-Chief, United States Seventh Fleet under Vice Admiral Charles D. Griffin and served as fleet operations officer until December 1961. Guinn then assumed command of the Combat stores ship, USS Rigel and commanded her during the exercises off the coast of Iceland in June 1962 and following the Cuban Missile Crisis in November that year.

In May 1963, Guinn assumed command of the aircraft carrier USS Forrestal and took part in the carrier suitability trials off the East Coast of the United States. He later led his vessel to the Mediterranean Sea and returned to Washington, D.C., for duty with the Office of Navy Program Appraisal in July 1964.

== Vietnam War ==
Guinn was promoted to the rank of rear admiral on June 1, 1965, and assumed command of Carrier Division 4, which was stationed in the Atlantic Ocean and the Mediterranean Sea. He remained in that capacity until May 1967, when he was sent to the Naval Air Station Pensacola, Florida, for duty as Chief of Naval Air Basic Training. His main duty was to train Naval aviators and support personnel during the ongoing Vietnam War and his tenure was marked with the establishing of many new concepts of training and increasing the number of flight hours flown by eleven percent while reducing the accident rate by twelve percent. Guinn was later decorated with the Legion of Merit for his service with Naval Air Basic Training.

In May 1969, Guinn was transferred to Washington, D.C., and assumed duty as Deputy Chief of Naval Personnel under Vice Admiral Charles K. Duncan. Upon the appointment of Admiral Elmo Zumwalt to the capacity of Chief of Naval Operations, Guinn was promoted to the rank of vice admiral on August 21, 1970, and succeeded admiral Duncan as Deputy Chief of Naval Operations (Manpower and Naval Reserve) and Chief of Naval Personnel at Zumwalt's order.

Guinn assumed the responsibility for the bureau of personnel during the withdrawal of U.S. forces from Vietnam and faced many problems due to forces reduction. Despite this, he provided an authoritative voice in manpower decisions at the executive levels of the Navy, Department of Defense and before the Congress. Despite the pressure of austere funding coupled with a decreasing force, Guinn's deep concern for the morale and welfare of Navy men and women has been manifested in the many programs he sponsored to increase compensation eligibility, educational opportunity, promotion opportunity, and career attractiveness.

He remained in that capacity until the end of January 1972, when he was relieved by Vice Admiral David H. Bagley and retired from active service one month later, completing 30 years of service. For his service with the Bureau of Personnel, Guinn was decorated with the Navy Distinguished Service Medal.

== Retirement ==
Upon the retirement from the Navy, Guinn returned to Pensacola, Florida, and assumed job as vice president and dean for university relations and development at the University of West Florida. While in this capacity he later assumed additional duty as professor of political science, bringing his military knowledge into the classroom. Guinn was also active in many organizations including the Navy League, Council on the Ageing and the United Way and the Historic Preservation Society.

Vice Admiral Dick H. Guinn died suddenly of cardiac arrest on August 26, 1980, aged 62, at Naval Hospital Pensacola, Florida. He is buried with full military honors at Barrancas National Cemetery together with his wife Muriel Jacqueline Parker Guinn. They had two children: Daryl and Charlsa.

== Decorations ==
Here is the ribbon bar of Vice Admiral Dick H. Guinn:

Naval Aviator Badge
1st Row	Navy Cross		
2nd Row	Navy Distinguished Service Medal	Legion of Merit	Air Medal and one 5/16" Gold Star
3rd Row	Navy Presidential Unit Citation with one star	American Defense Service Medal with "A" Device	American Campaign Medal
4th Row	European–African–Middle Eastern Campaign Medal	Asiatic-Pacific Campaign Medal with two 3/16 inch service stars	World War II Victory Medal
5th Row	Navy Occupation Service Medal	National Defense Service Medal with one star	Korean Service Medal with one 3/16 inch service star
6th Row	Armed Forces Expeditionary Medal	United Nations Korea Medal	Korean Presidential Unit Citation

== See also ==
- USS Forrestal (CV-59)

Military offices
Preceded by Charles K. Duncan	Chief of Naval Personnel; August 1970 - February 1972	Succeeded by David H. Bagley
