= Scott D. Conn =

US Navy officer (born c. 1963)

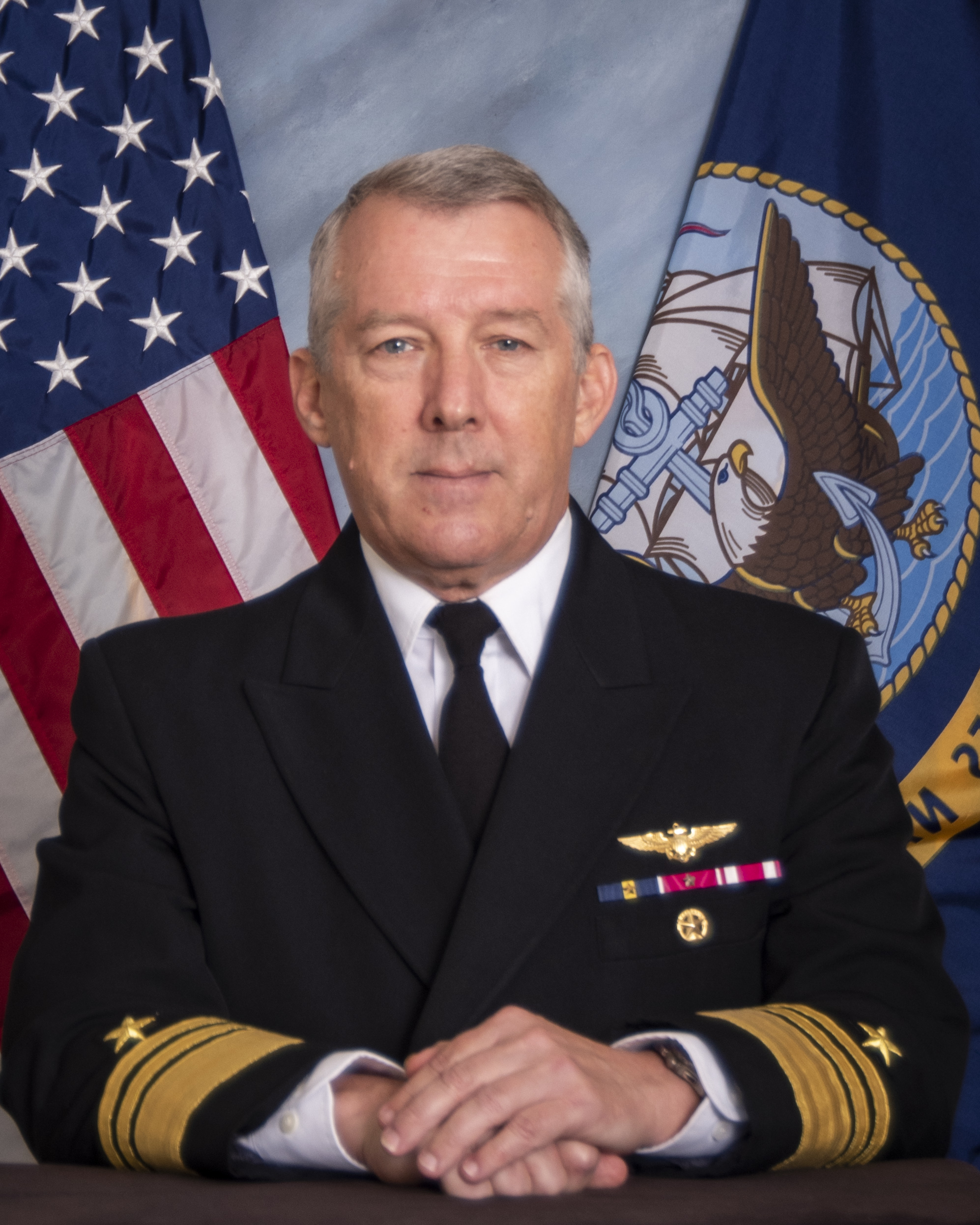
- Conn in 2021
- Born: 1962 (age 63–64)
- Education: Millersville University of Pennsylvania; Naval War College
- Military career
- Allegiance: United States
- Branch: United States Navy
- Service years: 1985–2023
- Rank: Vice Admiral
- Nickname: Satan
- Commands: United States Third Fleet; Carrier Strike Group Four; Naval Aviation Warfighting Development Center; Carrier Air Wing 11; VFA-106; VFA-136
- Awards: Navy Distinguished Service Medal (2); Legion of Merit (6)

Scott David Conn (born 1962) is a retired United States Navy vice admiral and career naval aviator who last served as the Deputy Chief of Naval Operations for Warfighting Requirements and Capabilities from July 2021 to August 2023. He previously served as the 30th commander of the United States Third Fleet from September 2019 to May 2021.

== Early life and education ==
Conn is a native of Lancaster, Pennsylvania, and a 1985 graduate of Millersville University of Pennsylvania. He was designated a naval aviator in May 1987. Conn is also a graduate of the Naval War College.

== Naval career ==
Conn’s command tours include Carrier Strike Group 4; Naval Aviation Warfighting Development Center, Carrier Air Wing 11, the F/A-18 series Fleet Replacement Squadron (FRS) Strike Fighter Squadron (VFA) 106; and VFA-136.

Conn's sea tours involved seven deployments on five different aircraft carriers in support of Operations Deliberate Force, Southern Watch, Deny Flight, Enduring Freedom and Iraqi Freedom. He has flown in excess of 100 combat missions, has accumulated over 4,700 flight hours and 1,000 arrested landings.

Ashore, Conn had multiple flying tours involving flight in the A-4 Skyhawk, Northrop F-5, F-16 Fighting Falcon and F/A-18 series aircraft. His staff tours include serving as the staff general secretary and United States Pacific Command (PACOM) event planner at the Joint Warfighting Center; as the executive assistant to Commander, United States Fleet Forces Command; and as the strike branch director for Director, Air Warfare (N98) and most recently completed a tour as the Director, Air Warfare (N98) on the staff of the Office of the Chief of Naval Operations. He assumed duties as the 30th Commander United States Third Fleet in September 2019.

Conn was the recipient of the 2004 Vice Admiral James Bond Stockdale Inspirational Leadership award.

Military offices
Preceded by Bruce H. Lindsey	Commander of Carrier Strike Group 4; 2016–2017	Succeeded by Kenneth R. Whitesell
Preceded by DeWolfe Miller III	Director of Air Warfare of the United States Navy; 2017–2019	Succeeded by Gregory N. Harris
Preceded by John D. Alexander	Commander of the United States Third Fleet; 2019–2021	Succeeded by Stephen T. Koehler
Preceded by James W. Kilby	Deputy Chief of Naval Operations for Warfighting Requirements and Capabilities of the United States Navy; 2021–2023	Succeeded by Christopher A. Miller; Acting
