= John Skillman =

U.S. Navy admiral (born 1964)

Brad Skillman
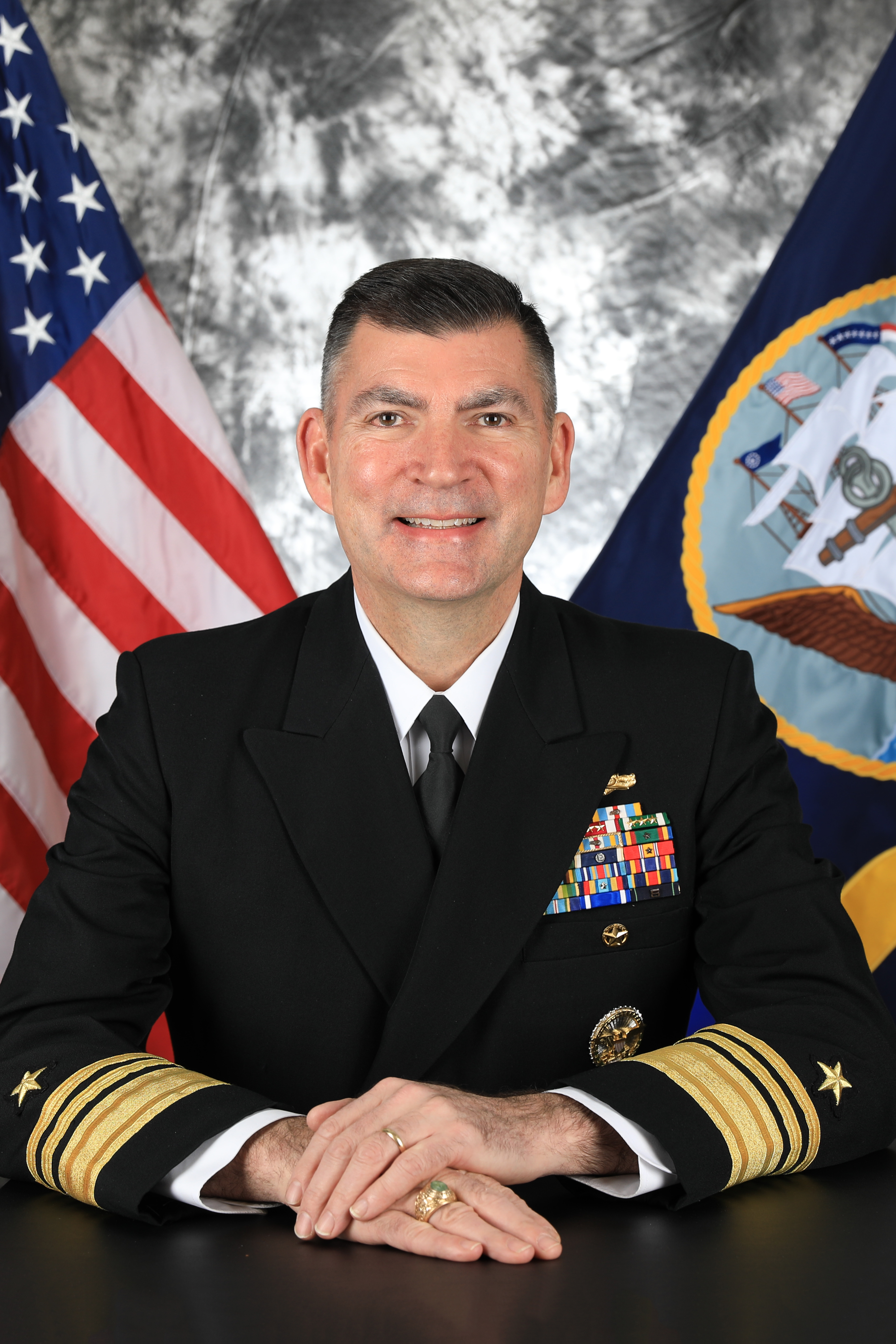
- Born: John Bradley Skillman; 1964 (age 61–62)
- Alma mater: United States Naval Academy (BS); Naval Postgraduate School (MS)
- Military career
- Allegiance: United States
- Branch: United States Navy
- Service years: 1986–present
- Rank: Vice Admiral
- Commands: Expeditionary Strike Group 2 Amphibious Squadron 4 USS San Antonio (LPD-17); USS Ponce (LPD-15); USS New Orleans (LPD-18)

John Bradley Skillman (born 1964) is a United States Navy vice admiral who has served as deputy chief of naval operations for integration of capabilities and resources since December 2023. He most recently served as the Director of Programming of the U.S. Navy from 2020 to 2023. Previously, he served as the Director of Enterprise Support of the United States Navy.

In October 2026, Skillman was nominated for promotion to the rank of admiral and assignment as vice chief of naval operations pending confirmation by the Senate.

== Awards and decorations ==
Surface Warfare Officer Insignia
Command at Sea insignia
Office of the Secretary of Defense Identification Badge

Navy Distinguished Service Medal
Defense Superior Service Medal with bronze oak leaf cluster
Legion of Merit with three gold award stars
Meritorious Service Medal with two gold award stars
Navy and Marine Corps Commendation Medal with three gold award stars
Navy and Marine Corps Achievement Medal
Joint Meritorious Unit Award with bronze oak leaf cluster
Navy Unit Commendation with bronze service star
Navy Meritorious Unit Commendation with bronze service star
Navy "E" Ribbon with four Battle E awards
National Defense Service Medal with bronze service star
Armed Forces Expeditionary Medal with bronze service star
Global War on Terrorism Expeditionary Medal
Global War on Terrorism Service Medal
Armed Forces Service Medal
Navy Sea Service Deployment Ribbon with silver service star
Navy and Marine Corps Overseas Service Ribbon
Coast Guard Special Operations Service Ribbon
NATO Medal for Non-Article 5
Navy Pistol Marksmanship Ribbon with sharpshooter device

Military offices
Preceded by ???	Deputy Commander and Chief of Staff of the Joint Warfare Centre; 201?–2018	Succeeded by James A. Kirk
Preceded by Jeffrey W. Hughes	Commander of Expeditionary Strike Group 2; 2018–2019	Succeeded by Erik M. Ross
New office	Director of Enterprise Support of the United States Navy; 2019–2020	Succeeded by ???
Preceded by Michael P. Holland	Director of Programming of the United States Navy; 2020–2023	Succeeded by John V. Menoni
Preceded by Randy B. Crites	Deputy Chief of Naval Operations for Integration of Capabilities and Resources of the United States Navy; 2023–present	Incumbent
