= Daniel Cheever =

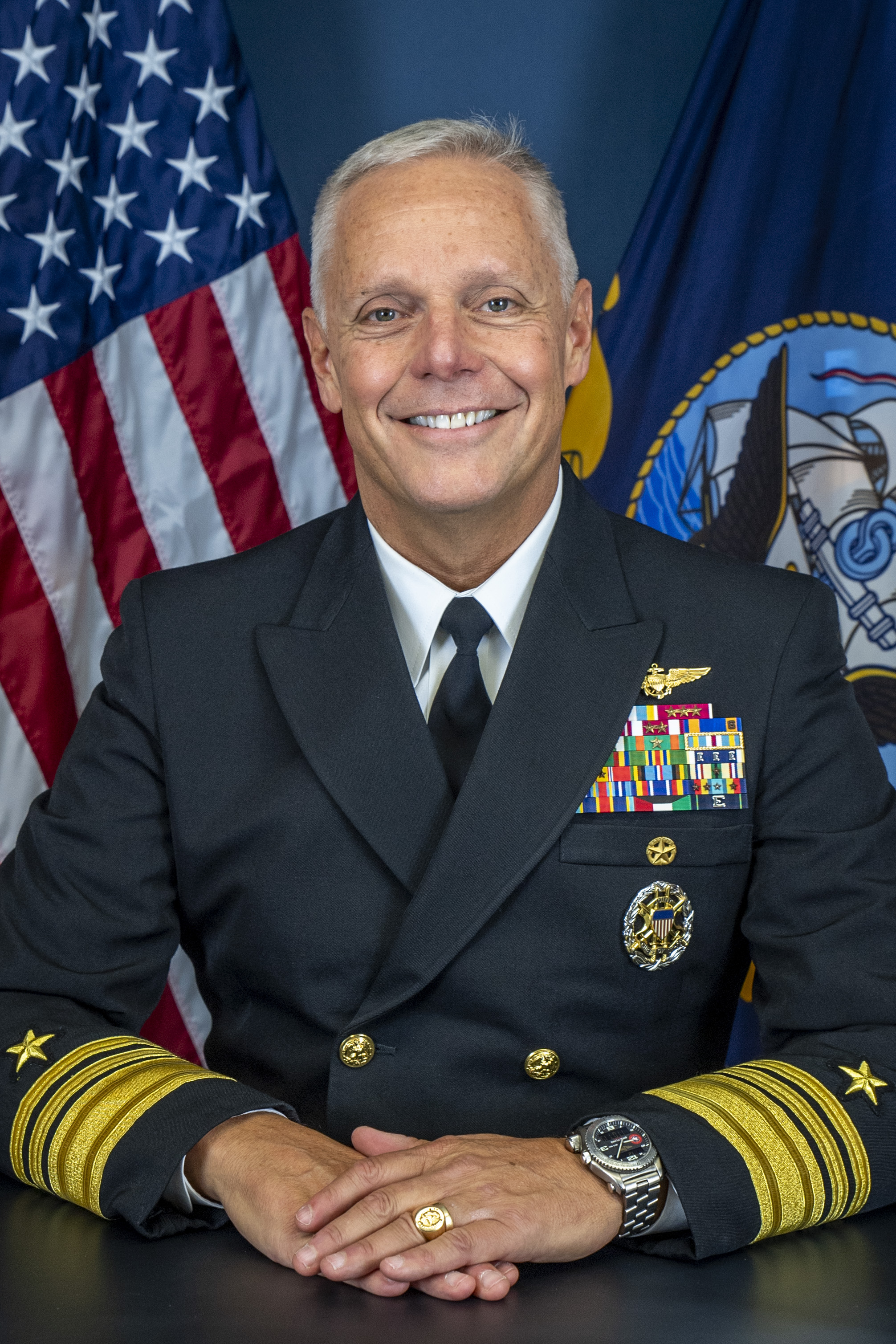
- Official portrait, 2024
- Born: 1963 (age 62–63)
- Military career
- Allegiance: United States
- Branch: United States Navy
- Service years: 1988–2026
- Rank: Vice Admiral
- Nickname: Undra
- Commands: Naval Air Forces; Naval Air Force, U.S. Pacific Fleet; Carrier Strike Group 4 Naval Aviation Warfighting Development Center; Carrier Air Wing Eight; VFA-147
- Conflicts: Gulf War
- Awards: Defense Superior Service Medal; Legion of Merit (4)

Daniel Lyle Cheever (born 1963) is retired United States Navy vice admiral who served as Commander, Naval Air Forces from 31 January 2024 To 30 January 2026. He most recently served as chief of staff of the North American Aerospace Defense Command and United States Northern Command from 2022 to 2023. He previously served as the Director of Plans, Policy, and Strategy of the North American Aerospace Defense Command and United States Northern Command from 2020 to 2022. He previously served as the Commander of Carrier Strike Group 4. Raised in Downers Grove, Illinois, Cheever earned a Bachelor of Business degree from Western Illinois University in 1986. He joined the Navy in 1988 and, after flight training, was designated a naval aviator in 1990.

In March 2023, Cheever was nominated for promotion to vice admiral and assignment as Commander, Naval Air Forces.

Military offices
Preceded by Daniel W. Dwyer	Commander of Carrier Air Wing 8; 2013–2015	Succeeded by Daniel P. Martin
Preceded by Gregory N. Harris	Commander of the Naval Aviation Warfighting Development Center; 2017–2019	Succeeded by Richard T. Brophy
Preceded by Kenneth R. Whitesell	Commander of Carrier Strike Group 4; 2019–2020	Succeeded by Andrew J. Loiselle
Preceded by John V. Fuller	Director of Plans, Policy, and Strategy of the North American Aerospace Defense Command and United States Northern Command; 2020–2022	Succeeded by Scott F. Robertson
Preceded by Michael P. Holland	Chief of Staff of the North American Aerospace Defense Command and United States Northern Command; 2022–2023	Succeeded by Allan M. Pepin
Preceded by Douglas C. Verissimo; Acting	Commander, Naval Air Forces and Commander, Naval Air Force, U.S. Pacific Fleet; 2024–2026	Succeeded by Douglas C. Verissimo
