= Kenneth R. Whitesell =

American Navy admiral

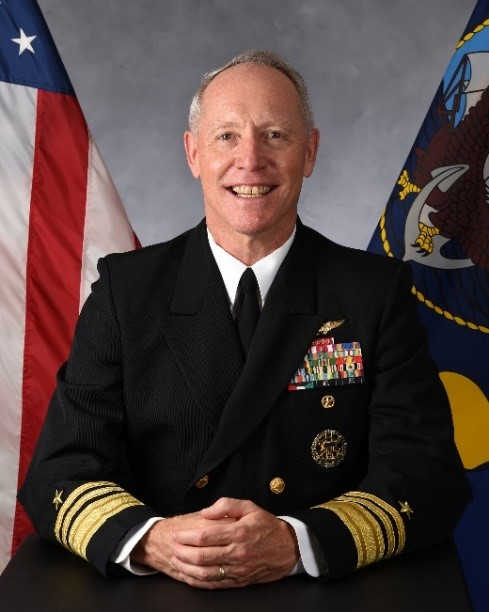
- Whitesell in 2020
- Born: July 19, 1961 (age 65); Stuarts Draft, Virginia, U.S.
- Education: Old Dominion University; Joint Forces Staff College; Naval War College
- Military career
- Allegiance: United States
- Branch: United States Navy
- Service years: 1985–2023
- Rank: Vice Admiral
- Commands: Naval Air Forces; Carrier Strike Group 2 Carrier Air Wing One; VFA-41
- Conflicts: Gulf War; Iraqi no-fly zones conflict; Operation Southern Watch; Kosovo War; Operation Allied Force; Iraq War; War against the Islamic State; Operation Inherent Resolve
- Awards: Navy Distinguished Service Medal; Legion of Merit (5)

Kenneth Ray Whitesell (born July 19, 1961) is a retired vice admiral in the United States Navy, and the past Commander, Naval Air Forces. He retired on September 7, 2023.

== Education ==
Whitesell grew up in Stuarts Draft, Virginia. He graduated from Old Dominion University in 1983 with a Bachelor of Science in Mechanical Engineering. He is also a graduate of the Joint Forces Staff College and the Naval War College, where he earned a Master of Arts in National Security and Strategic Studies.

== Naval career ==
Whitesell became a Naval Flight Officer in the United States Navy, being commissioned at Officer Candidate School in February 1985 and earning his Naval Aviator Insignia in October 1986. He graduated from the Navy Fighter Weapons School and flew the F-14 Tomcat and, later, the F/A-18 Super Hornet. He has over 4,000 flight hours.

His operational assignments have been aboard the aircraft carriers:

- Fighter Squadron VF-142, aboard USS Dwight D. Eisenhower
- Top Gun training officer and assistant operations officer with VF-74, aboard USS Saratoga
- VF-32, USS Theodore Roosevelt
- Strike Fighter Squadron VFA-41, USS Nimitz

Whitesell has participated in Operations Desert Shield, Southern Watch, Deliberate Guard/Allied Force, Iraqi Freedom and Inherent Resolve.

Overseas assignments ashore:

- Combined Air and Space Operations Center battle director, Al Udeid Air Base, Qatar
- Chief of staff and director, Maritime Operations Center, Commander, United States Navy Central Command/Commander, United States Fifth Fleet

=== Commands ===
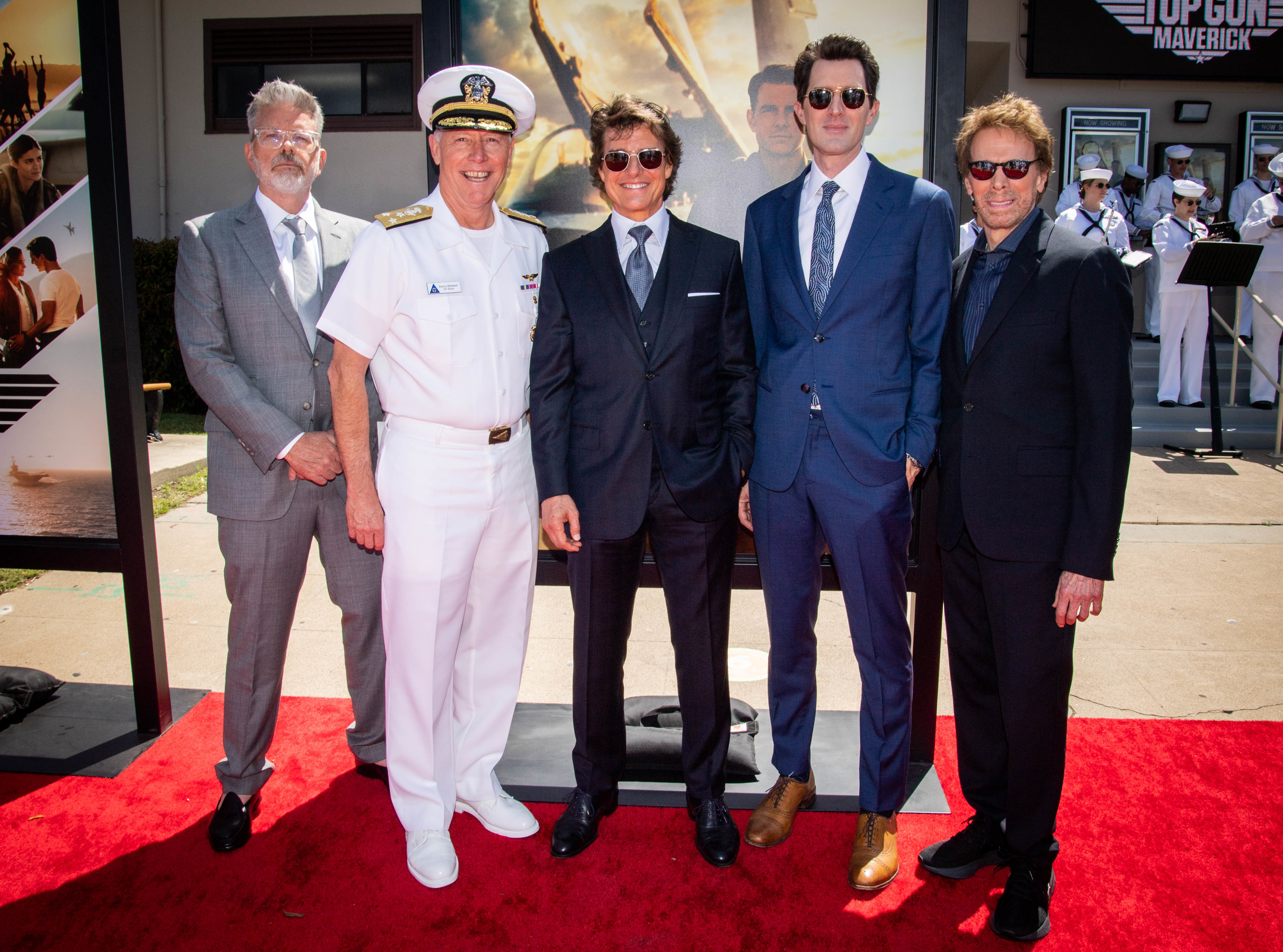
Christopher McQuarrie, Whitesell, Tom Cruise, Joseph Kosinski and Jerry Bruckheimer for the global premiere of Top Gun: Maverick.

Whitesell has served as commander of:

- Strike Fighter Squadron VFA-41, USS Nimitz
- Carrier Air Wing One aboard the aircraft carrier USS Enterprise,
- Carrier Strike Group 2 aboard the aircraft carrier USS George H.W. Bush,
- Naval Air Forces (COMNAVAIRFOR) and Naval Air Force, Pacific Fleet (COMNAVAIRPAC).

== Awards and decorations ==
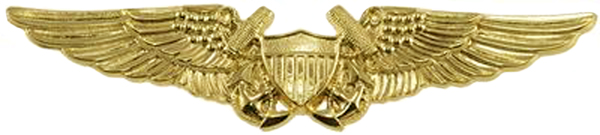
Naval flight officer
Command at Sea insignia
Office of the Joint Chiefs of Staff Identification Badge

Navy Distinguished Service Medal
Legion of Merit with four gold award stars
Defense Meritorious Service Medal
Meritorious Service Medal with award star
Air Medal with bronze Strike/Flight numeral "1"
Navy and Marine Corps Commendation Medal with two award stars
Navy and Marine Corps Achievement Medal with award star
Joint Meritorious Unit Award
Navy Unit Commendation
Navy Meritorious Unit Commendation with one bronze service star
National Defense Service Medal with service star
Armed Forces Expeditionary Medal
Southwest Asia Service Medal with service star
Iraq Campaign Medal with service star
Global War on Terrorism Expeditionary Medal
Armed Forces Service Medal
Navy Sea Service Deployment Ribbon with silver service star
Kuwait Liberation Medal (Kuwait)
Navy Expert Rifleman Medal
Navy Expert Pistol Shot Medal

Military offices
Preceded by Brian E. Luther	Commander of Carrier Strike Group 2; 2016–2017	Succeeded by Stephen C. Evans
Preceded by Scott D. Conn	Commander of Carrier Strike Group 4; 2017–2019	Succeeded by Daniel Cheever
Preceded by Matthew Carter	Deputy Commander of the United States Pacific Fleet; 2019–2020	Succeeded by Stephen T. Koehler
Preceded by DeWolfe Miller III	Commander of Naval Air Forces and Naval Air Force, U.S. Pacific Fleet; 2020–2023	Succeeded by George M. Wikoff; Acting
