= Nora W. Tyson =

US Navy admiral (born 1957)

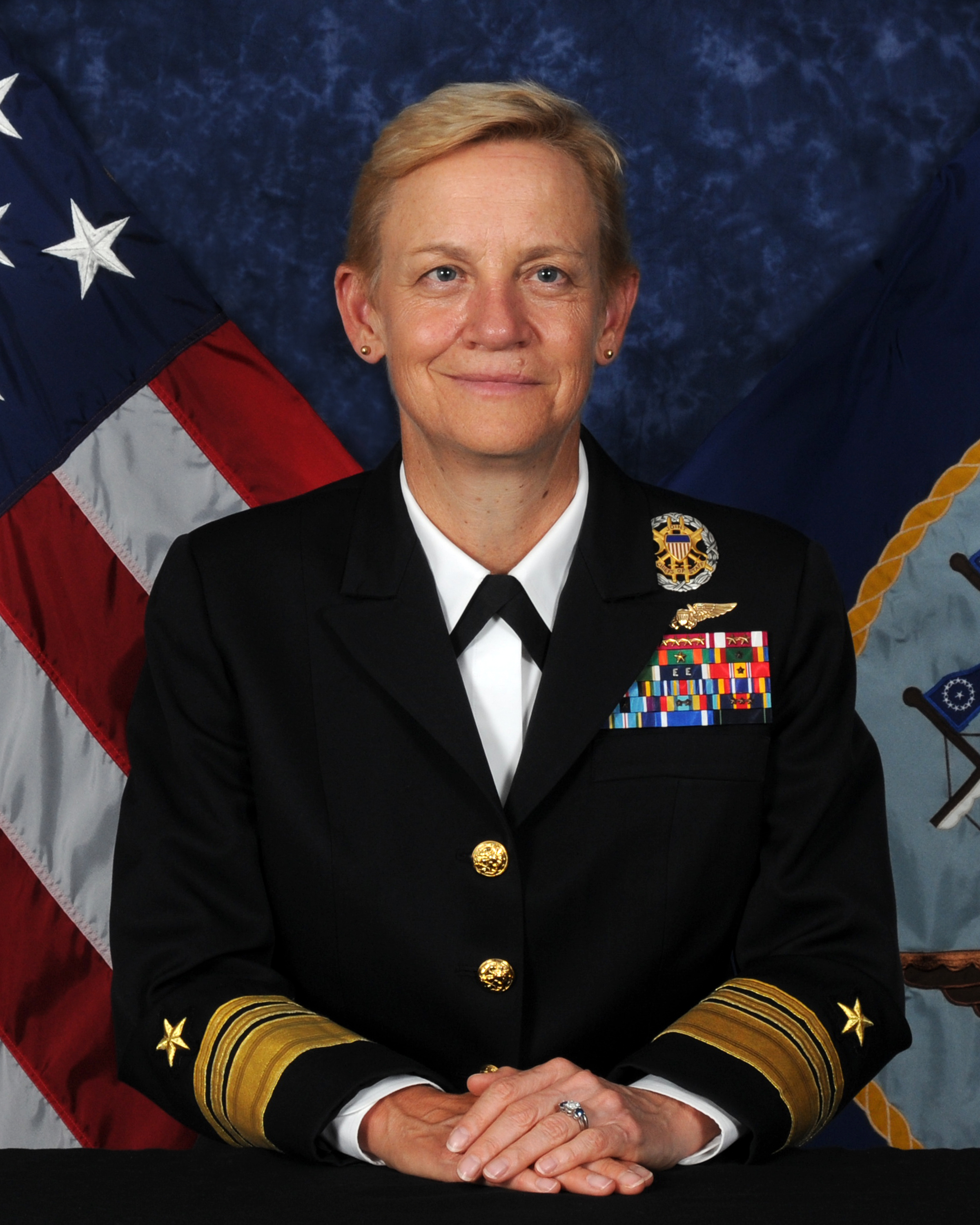
- Born: 1957 (age 68–69); Memphis, Tennessee, U.S.
- Military career
- Allegiance: United States
- Branch: United States Navy
- Service years: 1979–2017
- Rank: Vice Admiral
- Commands: United States Third Fleet; Carrier Strike Group Two; Task Force 73; USS Bataan (LHD-5); VQ-4 Shadows
- Conflicts: Iraq War
- Awards: Defense Superior Service Medal (2); Legion of Merit (5)

Nora Wingfield Tyson (born 1957) is a retired United States Navy vice admiral. In 2015, she was installed as commander of the Third Fleet, making her the first woman to lead a United States Navy ship fleet. She retired from service in 2017. Tyson previously served as the commander of Carrier Strike Group Two, from July 29, 2010, to January 12, 2012; she was the first female commander of a United States Navy Carrier Strike Group. She then served as Vice Director of the Joint Staff beginning in February 2012. In July 2013 she was promoted to vice admiral and named as Deputy Commander, United States Fleet Forces Command.

== Education ==
A native of Memphis, Tennessee, Nora Wingfield Tyson attended St. Mary's Episcopal School, graduating in 1975. Tyson graduated from Vanderbilt University in 1979, majoring in English. Later that year, she attended Officer Candidate School and was commissioned into the United States Navy in December 1979. In 1995, Tyson earned her Master of Arts in National Security and Strategic Affairs from the Naval War College.

== Naval career ==
After a tour in Washington D.C., Tyson became a Naval Flight Officer in 1983. She then served three tours in Fleet Air Reconnaissance Squadron Four (VQ-4) in both Naval Air Station Patuxent River and Tinker Air Force Base, one of which as a commanding officer. Ashore, she served as airborne communications officer course instructor and officer-in-charge at Naval Air Maintenance Training Detachment 1079, NAS Patuxent River, Maryland.

Other shore duty assignments included serving as a political-military planner and assistant in the Asia-Pacific Division of the Strategic Plans and Policy Directorate for the Joint Chiefs of Staff, the Director of Staff for the Commander of Naval Forces Europe, and an executive assistant to the Chief of Naval Operations.

Sea duty for Tyson included serving as a navigator aboard the nuclear-powered aircraft carrier USS Enterprise and the operations officer on the training aircraft carrier USS Lexington. Later, Captain Tyson commanded the amphibious assault ship USS Bataan during a time when the ship provided support for Hurricane Katrina relief, as well as undertaking two deployments to the Persian Gulf in support of Operation Iraqi Freedom. In September 2007, Tyson was promoted to rear admiral (lower half) and took command of Task Force 73 in Singapore.

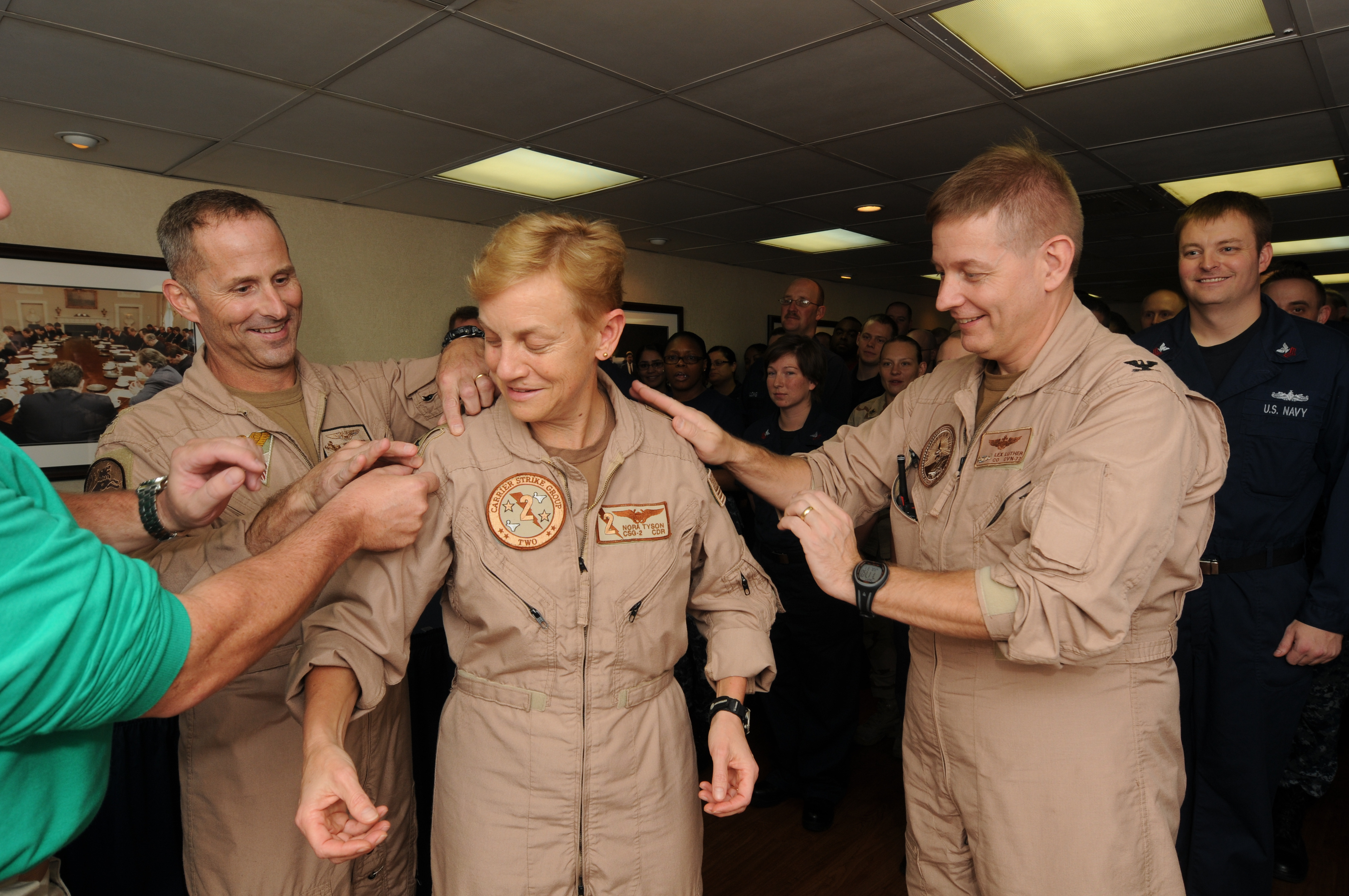
Rear Admiral Tyson, is pinned to rear admiral upper half by Captain Jeffery A. Davis, commander of Carrier Air Wing 8, left, and Captain Brian E. Luther, commanding officer of the aircraft carrier USS George H.W. Bush

On July 29, 2010, Tyson assumed command of Carrier Strike Group Two, with the nuclear-powered aircraft carrier USS George H.W. Bush as its flagship, becoming the first woman to command a United States Navy aircraft carrier task group. During the ceremony, she stated, "As far as the trailblazing piece, I understand I am the first woman on the job ... but I'm a professional just like my fellow officers are, and my fellow strike group commanders."

Carrier Strike Group Two completed its Composite Unit Training Exercise and Joint Task Force Exercise (JTFEX) predeployment underway training cycle and subsequently departed Norfolk Naval Base on its 2011 overseas deployment under the command of Tyson on 11 May 2011. The carrier strike group operated with the United States Sixth Fleet in the Mediterranean Sea and the United States Fifth Fleet in the Persian Gulf, with its aircraft flying missions as part of the War in Afghanistan.

In an August 1, 2011 ceremony on the George Bush, Tyson was promoted to rear admiral upper half. Former President George H. W. Bush administered the oath of office to Tyson via videolink from Kennebunkport, Maine.

Tyson served as Vice Director of the Joint Staff beginning in February 2012. In July 2013 she was promoted to vice admiral and named as Deputy Commander, United States Fleet Forces Command.

In 2015, Tyson was installed as commander of the Third Fleet, making her the first woman to lead a United States Navy ship fleet. Tyson implemented the '3rd Fleet Forward' initiative announced by CINCPACFLT Admiral Scott Swift, retaining Third Fleet operational control of forces, including a three-ship SAG and Carrier Strike Group 1, deployed beyond the hitherto Third Fleet/Seventh Fleet boundary at the International Date Line. She retired on September 18, 2017.

== Awards and decorations ==

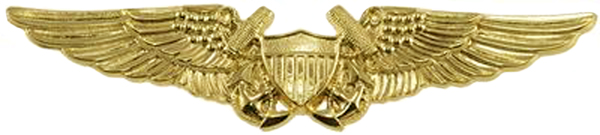

Badge	Office of the Joint Chiefs of Staff Identification Badge		
Badge	Naval Flight Officer Wings		
1st Row	Defense Superior Service Medal w/1 Oak Leaf Cluster	Legion of Merit w/ 4 award stars	Meritorious Service Medal w/ 2 award stars
2nd Row	Navy and Marine Corps Commendation Medal w/ 1 award star	Navy and Marine Corps Achievement Medal w/ 1 award star	Navy Unit Commendation w/ 1 service star
3rd Row	Navy Meritorious Unit Commendation w/ 3 service stars	Battle E Ribbon w/ 2nd award	National Defense Service Medal w/ 1 service star
4th Row	Armed Forces Expeditionary Medal	Global War on Terrorism Expeditionary Medal	Global War on Terrorism Service Medal
5th Row	Humanitarian Service Medal w/ 1 service star	Sea Service Deployment Ribbon w/ 2 service stars	Overseas Service Ribbon w/ 3 service stars
6th Row	Coast Guard Special Operations Service Ribbon	NATO Medal	Navy Pistol Marksmanship Ribbon

== See also ==
- List of female United States military generals and flag officers
- Women in the United States Navy

Military offices
Preceded by Jeffrey A. Hesterman; Acting	Commander of Carrier Strike Group 2; 2010–2012	Succeeded by Gregory M. Nosal
Preceded by Craig A. Franklin	Vice Director of the Joint Staff; 2012–2013	Succeeded by Frederick S. Rudesheim
Preceded by Michelle J. Howard	Deputy Commander of the United States Fleet Forces Command; 2013–2015	Succeeded by Richard P. Breckenridge
Preceded by Kenneth E. Floyd	Commander of the United States Third Fleet; 2015–2017	Succeeded by John D. Alexander
