= James Bynum =

U.S. Navy admiral

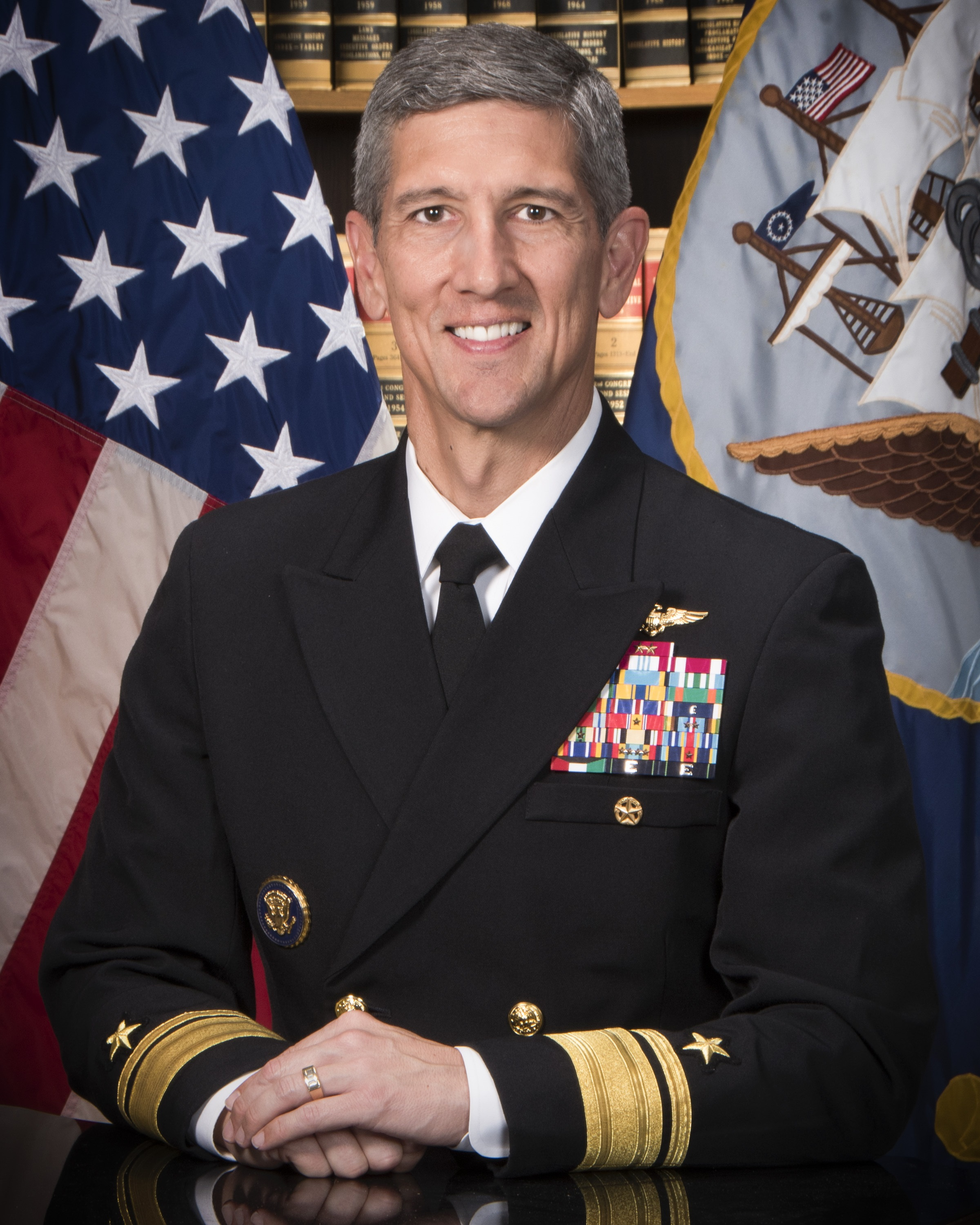
- Official portrait, 2017
- Nickname: Jay
- Born: October 17, 1962 (age 63); Waco, Texas, US
- Allegiance: United States
- Branch: United States Navy
- Service years: 1985–2021
- Rank: Rear Admiral
- Commands: Carrier Strike Group 9 Carrier Air Wing 3 VFA-27
- Conflicts: Gulf War; Iraq War
- Awards: Legion of Merit (3); Bronze Star Medal
- Education: University of Oklahoma

James Stuart Bynum (born October 17, 1962) is a retired United States Navy rear admiral who served as the Assistant Deputy Chief of Naval Operations for Warfighting Development and Director of Warfare Integration from May 4, 2020, to May 29, 2021. Previously, he served as the Director of Assessment from 2018 to 2020.

Born and raised in Waco, Texas, Bynum graduated from the University of Oklahoma with a Bachelor of Arts degree in database management in 1985. He was designated a naval aviator in December 1986.

Bynum is the son of James Arthur Bynum and Lynda Vernon (Massey) Bynum.

Military offices
| Preceded by Lisa Franchetti | Commander of Carrier Strike Group 9; 2016–2017 | Succeeded by Stephen T. Koehler |
| Preceded by Dell Bull | Chief of Naval Air Training; 2017–2018 | Succeeded by Gregory N. Harris |
