= Gregory N. Harris =

U.S. Navy admiral

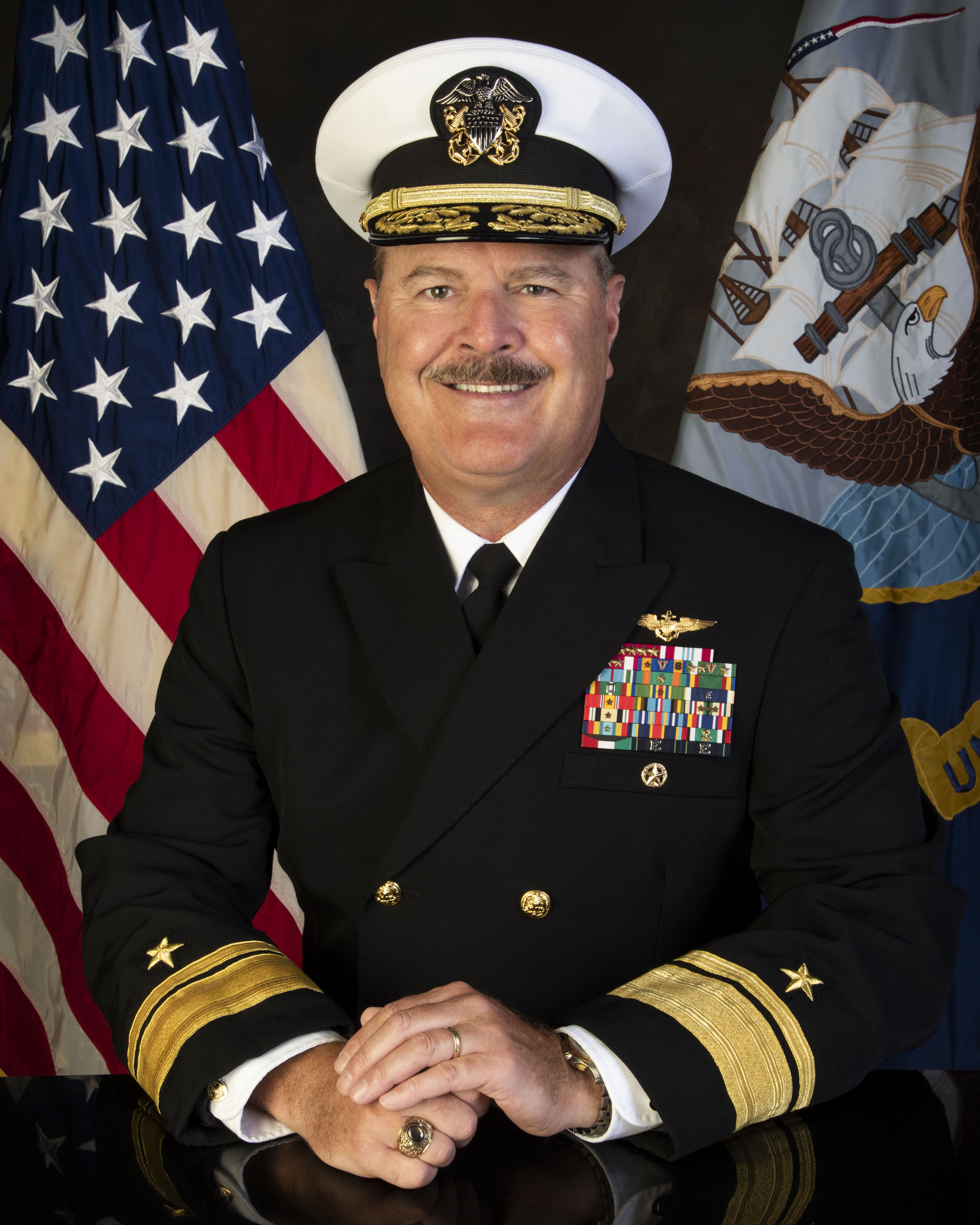
- Official portrait, 2019
- Born: 1965 (age 60–61)
- Military career
- Allegiance: United States
- Branch: United States Navy
- Service years: 1987–2021
- Rank: Rear Admiral
- Nickname: HYFI
- Commands: Carrier Strike Group 11; Naval Aviation Warfighting Development Center; Carrier Air Wing Eleven; VFA-122; VFA-115
- Conflicts: Gulf War; Iraq War
- Awards: Legion of Merit (5)

Gregory Norton Harris (born 1965) is a retired rear admiral of the United States Navy where he was Director of Air Warfare from August 23, 2019 to June 2021. Previously he was the Chief of Naval Air Training from July 12, 2018, to July 26, 2019.

Raised in Yarmouth, Maine, Harris is a 1987 graduate of the United States Naval Academy. Originally designated a Naval Flight Officer in May 1989, he became a Naval Aviator in May 1993. Harris logged over 4,300 flight hours and 1,045 arrested landings. He flew over 100 combat missions in support of Operations Desert Shield, Desert Storm, Southern Watch, Enduring Freedom, Iraqi Freedom and Inherent Resolve.

Military offices
Preceded by William D. Byrne Jr.	Commander of Carrier Strike Group 11; 2017–2018	Succeeded by Donald D. Gabrielson
Preceded by James S. Bynum	Chief of Naval Air Training; 2018–2019	Succeeded by Daniel W. Dwyer
Preceded by Scott D. Conn	Director of Air Warfare of the United States Navy; 2019–2021	Succeeded by Andrew J. Loiselle
