= Randy B. Crites =

U.S. Navy Vice admiral

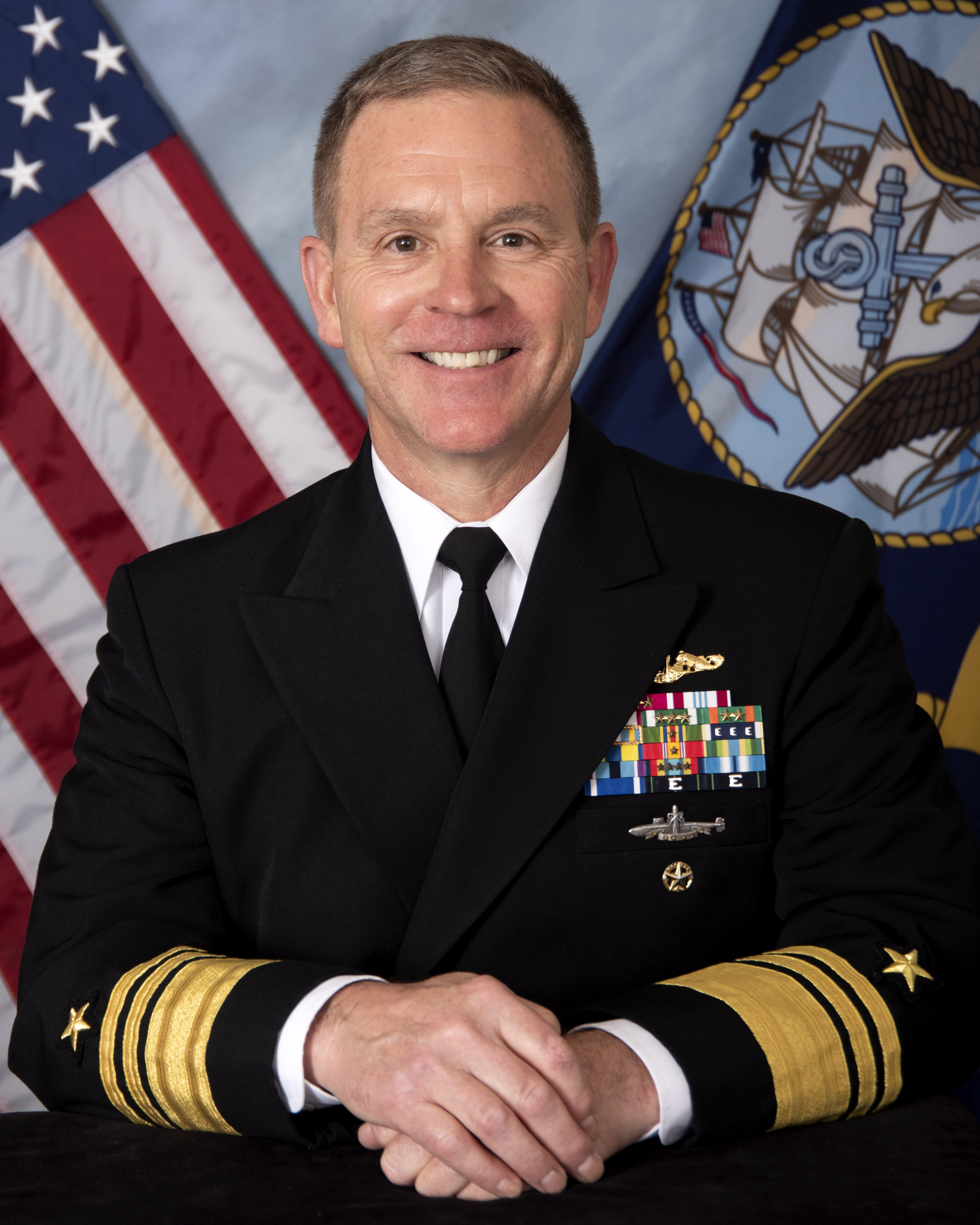
- Crites in 2020
- Born: 1962 (age 63–64); Lima, Ohio, United States
- Education: Naval War College; Ohio State University
- Military career
- Allegiance: United States
- Branch: United States Navy
- Service years: 1983–2023
- Rank: Vice admiral
- Commands: Submarine Group 10; USS Florida (SSGN-728); USS West Virginia (SSBN-736)
- Awards: Navy Distinguished Service Medal (2); Legion of Merit (5)
- Randy B. Crites's voice Crites's opening statement at a House Armed Services Readiness Subcommittee hearing on military readiness Recorded July 19, 2022

Randy B. Crites (born 1962) is a retired vice admiral of the United States Navy. He last served as Deputy Chief of Naval Operations for Integration of Capabilities and Resources from May 15, 2020, to 2023. He previously served as the Deputy Assistant Secretary of the Navy for Budget, and as director of the Fiscal Management Division (OPNAV N82) in Washington, D.C., until he was promoted to the rank of vice admiral in 2020. Prior he served as the Director of OPNAV N81 Assessments Division, as Director of the Maritime Headquarters at United States Pacific Fleet, as Commander Submarine Group 10, and as Commanding officer of USS West Virginia (SSBN-736) and USS Florida (SSGN-728).

== Early life and education ==
Crites was born and raised in Lima, Ohio. He attended Shawnee High School, graduating in 1980. Crites studied mining engineering at Ohio State University, where he obtained his Bachelor of Science degree in 1984. Crites was commissioned as an ensign in the United States Navy in 1985 through the Nuclear Propulsion Officer Candidate (NUPOC) program. In 1996, he moved to Newport, Rhode Island, where he attended the Naval War College and studied security studies and completed a master's degree in National Security Affairs. Crites is also a graduate of the MIT Seminar XXI National Securities study program.

== Naval career ==
After commissioning through Officer Candidate School, Crites completed training at Nuclear Power School and the Nuclear Power Training Unit before serving as a division officer aboard the Sturgeon-class nuclear attack submarine USS Ray (SSN-653). He later served aboard the Sturgeon-class USS Archerfish (SSN-678) as the navigator and operations officer before his third sea-tour where he served as the executive officer aboard the Ohio-class ballistic missile submarine USS Nebraska (SSBN-739). Afterwards, he assumed command of the Ohio-class ballistic missile submarine USS West Virginia (SSBN-736), completing four strategic patrols, and later assumed command of the Ohio-class guided missile submarine USS Florida (SSGN-728).

Crites headed navy's branches stationed at various places. He was appointed as the branch head for Program Planning and Development. His other tours ashore include instructor at the United States Fleet Forces Command (formerly United States Atlantic Fleet), and a naval member of the Tactical Readiness Evaluation Team. He later served as commander of a nuclear-powered submarine project the Submarine Program Section (SPS) and Shipbuilding Account Manager (SAM). He also headed the United States Strategic Command as weapons system programmer. He remained commanding officer of the Performance Monitoring Team (PMT) at Submarine Squadron 4.

Before being appointed as Deputy Chief of Naval Operations (DCNO) for Integration of Capabilities and Resources (OPNAV N8), Crites served as commander of Submarine Group 10, director of Maritime Headquarters in the Pacific Fleet, the Director of the OPNAV Assessments Division (OPNAV N81), and served simultaneously as deputy assistant Secretary of the Navy for Budget (FMB) and as the Director of OPNAV's Fiscal Management Division (OPNAV N82).

== Awards and decorations ==

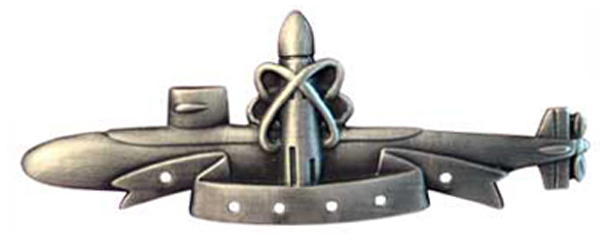

Badge	Submarine Warfare insignia (Officer)		
1st row	Navy Distinguished Service Medal with gold award star	Legion of Merit with four gold award stars	Defense Meritorious Service Medal
2nd row	Meritorious Service Medal with award star	Navy Commendation Medal with three award stars	Navy Achievement Medal with two award stars
3rd row	Joint Meritorious Unit Award	Navy Meritorious Unit Commendation with one bronze service star	Navy "E" Ribbon with three Battle "E" devices
4th row	Navy Expeditionary Medal	National Defense Service Medal with service star	Armed Forces Service Medal
5th row	Humanitarian Service Medal	Navy Sea Service Deployment Ribbon with four service stars	Navy Arctic Service Ribbon
6th row	NATO Medal for the former Yugoslavia	Navy Expert Rifleman Medal	Navy Expert Pistol Shot Medal
Badge	Silver SSBN Deterrent Patrol insignia (7 awards)		
Badge	Command at Sea insignia		

Military offices
Preceded by Charles A. Richard	Commander of Submarine Group 10; 2015–2017	Succeeded by Michael P. Holland
Preceded by William K. Lescher	Deputy Chief of Naval Operations for Integration of Capabilities and Resources of the United States Navy; 2020–2023	Succeeded by John B. Skillman
