= Jerry L. Unruh =

American retired vice admiral (born 1939)

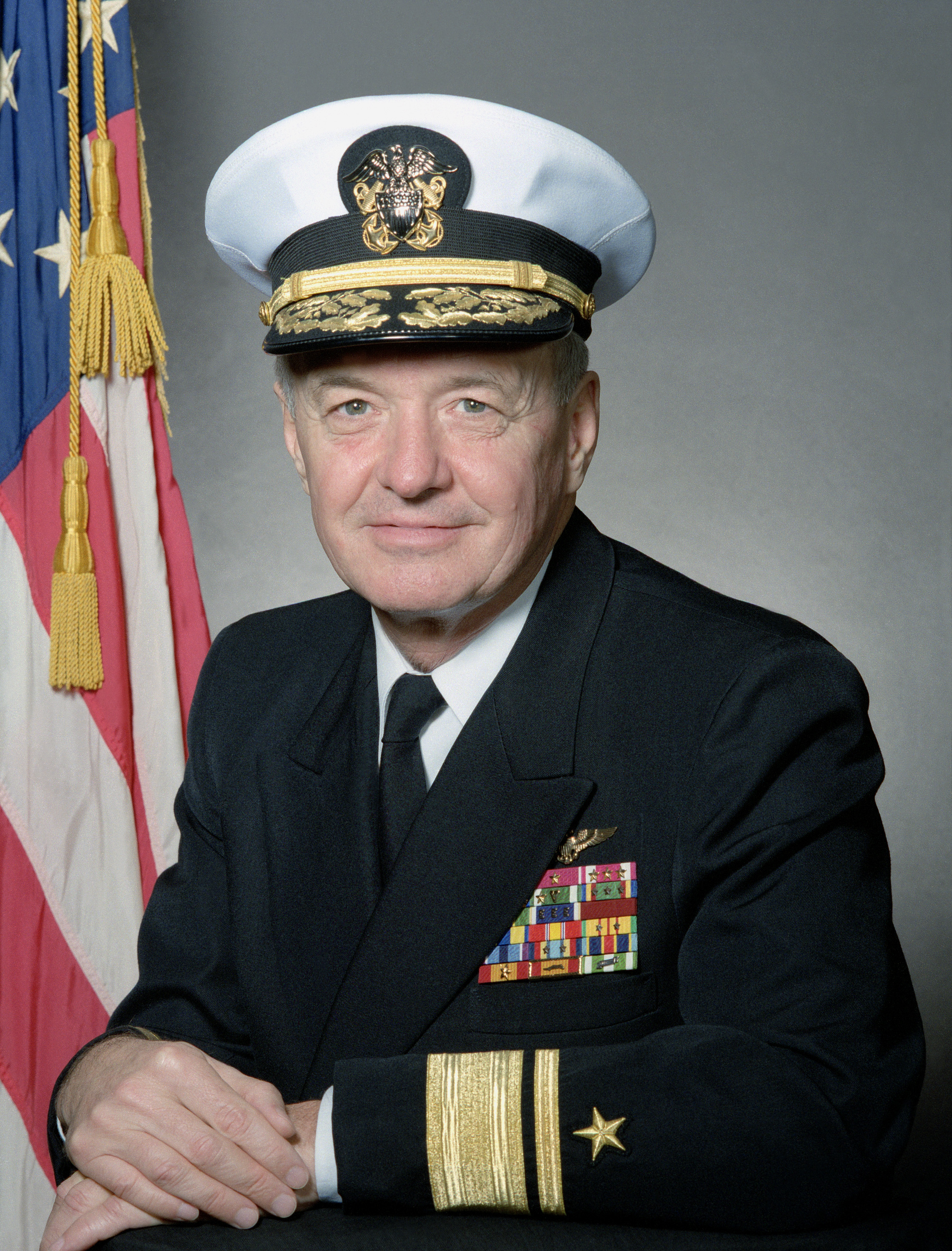
- Pictured as rear admiral, 1992
- Born: November 21, 1939 (age 86); Dodge City, Kansas, U.S.
- Relatives: Wife, Dee
- Military career
- Allegiance: United States
- Branch: United States Navy
- Service years: 1958–1994
- Rank: Vice admiral

Jerry Lee Unruh (born November 21, 1939) is a retired Vice Admiral in the United States Navy.

Enlisting in the Navy in 1958, he was later selected for the Naval Aviation Cadet (NAVCAD) program, earning his commission as an Ensign and his wings as a Naval Aviator in 1961. As a career fighter pilot, he flew the F-8 Crusader and F-14 Tomcat. He commanded the United States Third Fleet from 1991 to 1994.

His awards include the Navy Distinguished Service Medal, Defense Superior Service Medal, Legion of Merit (2), Meritorious Service Medal (4), Air Medal (14), and the Vietnamese Cross of Gallantry.

Over 20 years after retiring from the U.S. Navy, on September 14, 2020, he joined other retired senior military leaders by endorsing President Donald Trump for reelection.
