= United States Third Fleet =

Numbered fleet of the United States Navy

Commander, U.S. Third Fleet
- Third Fleet Logo
- Active: 15 March 1943 – 7 October 1945 1 February 1973 – present (53 years, 8 months)
- Country: United States
- Branch: United States Navy
- Type: Fleet
- Part of: United States Pacific Fleet
- Garrison/HQ: Naval Base Point Loma
- Engagements: World War II
- Website: https://www.c3f.navy.mil/

Commanders
- Commander: VADM Marc Miguez
- Deputy: RDML Suzanne Bailey
- Chief of Staff: CAPT Tony Nichols
- Notable commanders: FADM William F. Halsey

The United States Third Fleet is the largest numbered fleet in the United States Navy. Third Fleet's area of responsibility includes approximately fifty million square miles of the eastern and northern Pacific Ocean areas including the Bering Sea, Alaska, the Aleutian Islands, and a sector of the Arctic. Major oil and trade sea lines of communication within this area are critically important to the economic health of the United States and friendly nations throughout the Pacific Rim region.

First established in 1943, the Third Fleet conducted extensive operations against Japanese forces in the Central Pacific during World War II. Deactivated in 1945, the fleet remained inactive until 1973, when it was reactivated and assumed its current responsibilities.

== Mission ==
The Third Fleet plans and executes naval operations in the Pacific Ocean. The fleet provides maritime homeland defense, regional security, and humanitarian operations support through integrated naval and coastguard forces acting as a single Sea Service. It strengthens relations between the U.S. and its allies and partners through joint, inter-agency and multinational exercises and operations like Rim of the Pacific, Pacific Partnership, and Fleet Weeks. The Third Fleet ensures realistic, relevant training to its personnel so they have the necessary skills to promote peace and prevail in conflict.

The Third Fleet is a combat-ready power in control of ships, submarines, and aircraft stationed in California, Washington, and Hawaii. The Third Fleet's sea-going force includes five aircraft carrier strike groups, each consisting of a combination of cruisers, destroyers, and frigates. They also have more than 30 submarines and a dozen supply ships to support the strike groups. Third Fleet's air forces comprises more than 400 Navy aircraft, including Boeing F/A-18 Super Hornets, Northrop Grumman E-2C Hawkeyes, McDonnell Douglas AV-8B Harrier II, Bell AH-1Z Viper and Sikorsky SH-60 Seahawk helicopters.

== History ==
=== World War II ===
The Third Fleet was originally formed on 15 March 1943, during World War II, as the mobile element of Admiral William F. Halsey's South Pacific Area forces. For just over a year this fleet, consisting mainly of older surface vessels and amphibious units, supported by land-based aircraft, advanced up the Solomon Islands from Guadalcanal toward the Japanese base at Rabaul. Once the Solomons operation came to a conclusion the fleet was reconceived: on 15 June 1944 a new headquarters was established ashore, at Pearl Harbor, Hawaii, and the ships of the larger Fifth Fleet, the command of Admiral Raymond A. Spruance, (Note: The "Big Blue Fleet" was the name given to the main fleet of the U.S. Navy in the Pacific. The term stems from pre-war planning, called the "color plans" because each nation included was given a color code name. In these plans for potential conflicts, the British Royal Navy was "Red," the German Navy was "Black," and so forth. The Imperial Japanese Navy was termed the "Orange Fleet," while the U.S. fleet was the "Blue Fleet". The "Big Blue Fleet" was the massive fleet that the U.S. Navy anticipated it would field to win a war with Japan and which it thought largely would come into being by late 1943 or early 1944.) which included most of the newest ships in the Navy, were incorporated into the Third Fleet. Halsey commanded this force (by this time known as the "Big Blue Fleet") through the Palau and Philippine Campaigns, then transferred it back to Spruance (once again becoming the Fifth Fleet) for the Iwo Jima and Okinawa Campaigns, before settling again on Halsey, who directed it through the final aerial offensive campaign against the Japanese Home Islands. This alternating command system gave the senior staffs of the two admirals the chance to plan operations in closer cooperation with Admiral Nimitz' theater staff in Hawaii. A secondary benefit was that it helped confuse the Japanese into thinking that there were actually two separate fleets deployed against them as the fleet designation flipped back and forth.

While under Halsey's command as the Third Fleet, the fleet operated in and around the Solomon Islands, the Philippines, Formosa, Okinawa, the Ryukyu Islands, and the Japanese Home Islands, first with the battleship USS New Jersey and, from May 1945 to the end of the war, the battleship USS Missouri as its flagship. As the Third Fleet, it took part in the Palau Islands campaign of September–November 1944 and the Philippines campaign of 1944–1945, defeated the Imperial Japanese Navy in two of the four major actions – the Battle of the Sibuyan Sea and the Battle off Cape Engaño – that made up the Battle of Leyte Gulf in October 1944, encountered the damaging Typhoon Cobra in December 1944, endured Typhoon Connie in June 1945, and took part in the war's final operations in Japanese waters in the summer of 1945, launching air attacks on Tokyo, the naval base at Kure, and the island of Hokkaidō and bombarding several Japanese coastal cities with naval gunfire.

The British Pacific Fleet was operating as Task Force 57 of the Fifth Fleet when Halsey relieved Spruance of command in May 1945. Like the rest of the Fifth Fleet's ships, the British ships were resubordinated from Spruance's Fifth Fleet to Halsey's Third Fleet. The British Pacific Fleet then constituted Task Force 37 under the Third Fleet's operational command through the end of World War II on 15 August 1945.

The Third Fleet's next major combat operation would have been Operation Olympic, the invasion of Kyushu in the Japanese Home Islands, scheduled to begin on 1 November 1945. The size of the operation resulted in plans for the Fifth Fleet to function as a separate command, operating simultaneously with the Third Fleet for the first time. The end of the war made Operation Olympic unnecessary.

Embarked aboard Missouri, Admiral Halsey led the Third Fleet into Tokyo Bay on 29 August 1945. On 2 September 1945, the documents of surrender of the Japanese Empire ending the war were signed on Missouri's deck. The Third Fleet remained in Japanese waters until late September 1945, when its ships were directed to proceed to the United States West Coast. On 7 October 1945, the Third Fleet was designated a reserve fleet and decommissioned from active status.

=== Re-establishment and after ===
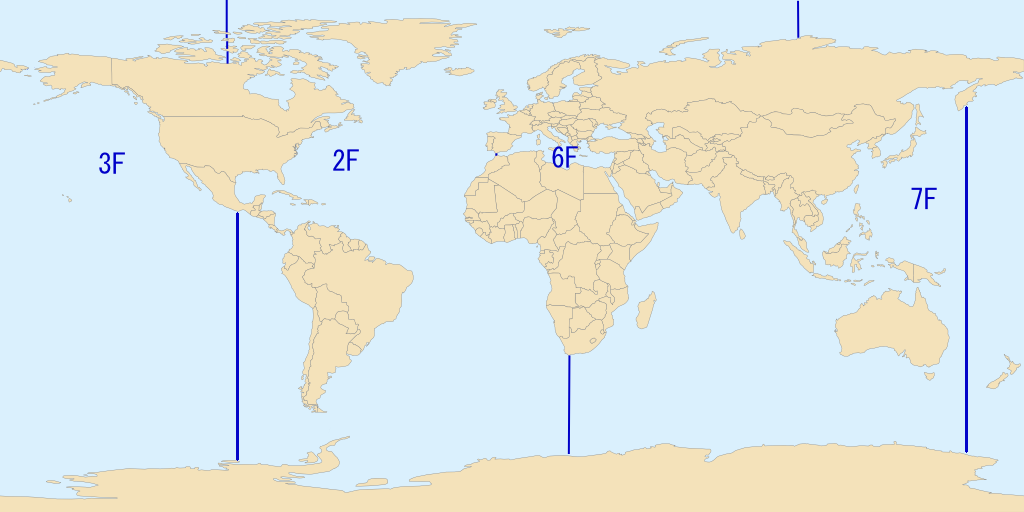
The areas of responsibility of the United States Second (marked "2F"), Third ("3F"), Sixth ("6F"), and Seventh ("7F") Fleets during the 1980s.

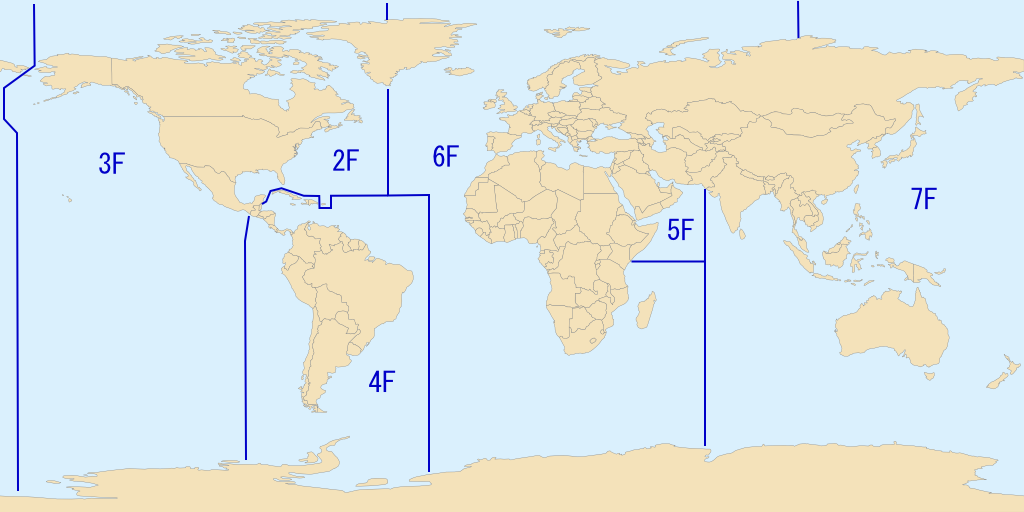
The areas of responsibility of the United States Second (marked "2F"), Third ("3F"), Fourth ("4F"), Fifth ("5F"), Sixth ("6F"), and Seventh ("7F") Fleets in 2009.

On 1 February 1973, following a reorganization of the Pacific Fleet, the Third Fleet was recommissioned as an active fleet and assumed the duties of the former First Fleet and Pacific Anti-Submarine Warfare Force located at Ford Island, Hawaii. Third Fleet's new duties were to train naval forces for overseas deployment and evaluate state-of-the-art technology for fleet use. Additionally, Third Fleet could deploy in the event of a major conflict.

On 26 November 1986, Commander, Third Fleet shifted his flag from his headquarters ashore to resume status as an afloat commander for the first time since World War II, aboard USS Coronado. In August 1991, Third Fleet's commander, his staff and the command ship Coronado shifted homeports to San Diego. In September 2003, Commander, Third Fleet shifted his flag from the command ship Coronado to headquarters ashore at Point Loma, San Diego, California.

USS Ronald Reagan and other Third Fleet ships participated in the International Fleet Review (IFR) commemorating the 100th birthday of the Royal Canadian Navy in Victoria, British Columbia. Joining Ronald Reagan for the naval review were the cruiser Chosin, the destroyer Sampson, and the frigate Ford. The naval review took place 9–12 June 2010, and it involved 21 naval ships and more than 8,000 naval personnel from Canada, the French Navy, the Japanese Maritime Self-Defense Force, the Royal Australian Navy, the Royal New Zealand Navy, and the United States.

In 2015, Nora Tyson was installed as the new commander of the Third Fleet, making her the first woman to lead a numbered fleet in the U.S. Navy.

== Current operations ==
Third Fleet's primary mission is one of conflict deterrence, but in the event of general war, it would conduct prompt and sustained combat operations at sea. Such operations would be executed well forward and early in a conflict to carry out the primary wartime mission of Third Fleet—the defense of the western sea approaches to the United States, including Alaska and the Aleutian Islands. There are four Carrier Strike Groups reportedly assigned to the Third Fleet: USS Nimitz (CVN-68) and Carrier Strike Group Eleven; USS Carl Vinson (CVN-70) and Carrier Strike Group One; USS Theodore Roosevelt (CVN-71) and Carrier Strike Group Nine; and USS Abraham Lincoln (CVN-72) and Carrier Strike Group Three.

In peacetime, Third Fleet continually trains Navy and U.S. Marine Corps forces for their expeditionary warfare mission. Third Fleet training has been designed to ensure that deploying forces are fully prepared for joint operations. All training is conducted within a joint environment—employing joint doctrine, terminology, procedures, command and control—to ensure that forces are ready to join with the other United States armed forces branches under a joint command structure.

Commander, Third Fleet is also designated as a Joint Task Force (JTF) commander. In that capacity, the commander and their staff may be assigned responsibilities for command of joint U.S. forces deployed in response to a specific event or contingency. As such, the JTF commander reports via a joint chain of command to a unified commander. Commander, U.S. Pacific Command is the unified commander in the Pacific theater.

To allow 7th Fleet to focus more resources on a potential North Korean contingency, the 3rd Fleet is building up its ability to operate forces beyond the International Date Line, in areas of the Western Pacific hitherto commanded by 7th Fleet. The "3rd Fleet Forward" concept was announced by U.S. Pacific Fleet commander Admiral Scott Swift in 2015, but 3rd Fleet commander Vice Adm. Nora Tyson said at the "WEST 2017" conference that the North Korean threat was a main driver behind this effort:

"What we have done in the past really 18 months is we, 3rd Fleet, have worked very closely with 7th Fleet and PACFLT in developing our, 3rd fleet's, capability to command and control forces forward in the Western Pacific, with the assumption that if something were to happen – and as [Vice Admiral Joseph Aucoin, Commander 7th Fleet] said, the number-one probability fight-tonight scenario would be on the Korean Peninsula. "If that were the case, the assumption is that [Aucoin] and his team would be pretty busy up there.. working for General Brooks [ComUSFK/CFC/UNC] and 3rd Fleet would be available to provide that command element to handle whatever else may happen in the Pacific Fleet AOR ...be it a major humanitarian disaster requiring that level of [joint task force] three-star commander, be it some scenario, maritime security issue in the South China Sea. So we have been working very closely with 7th Fleet, [Aucoin] and his team, and PACFLT to ensure that we have the connective tissue where if something were to happen that 3rd Fleet could very quickly respond, complement [Aucoin] and his team and handle whatever scenario may come to pass in the Pacific theater."

In April 2016, Vice Admiral Tyson deployed a three-ship Surface Action Group of warships (Momsen, Spruance, and USS Decatur (DDG-73))) to the Western Pacific. On Oct. 21, one of them, the destroyer USS Decatur, conducted a "Freedom of Navigation" passage near the Paracel Islands, separately claimed by the PRC, Vietnam and Taiwan. All three ships remained under Third Fleet command during the entire operation. As Tyson partially acknowledged during her WEST 2017 conference remarks, "the Chinese know that this administrative (and) operational innovation is directed at them," said Toshi Yoshihara, a U.S. Naval War College professor in January 2017.

== Component units ==
U.S. Third Fleet component units include the following:

- Carrier Strike Group One
- Carrier Strike Group Three
- Carrier Strike Group Nine
- Carrier Strike Group Eleven
- Carrier Strike Group Fifteen
- Expeditionary Strike Group Three
- Naval Surface Group Mid-Pacific
- Littoral Combat Ship Squadron One
- Helicopter Maritime Strike Wing
- Mine Countermeasures Group Three
- Explosive Ordnance Disposal Group One
- Coastal Riverine Group One
- Navy Air and Missile Defense Command
- Naval Mine and Anti-Submarine Warfare Command
- Submarine and Theater Anti-Submarine Warfare Force Third Fleet

== Task Forces ==
| Task Force Name | Task Force Type | Location/Notes |
|---|---|---|
| CTF-30 | Battle force | N/A |
| Task Force 31 | Command and Coordination Force | Source Polmar Ships and Aircraft of the U.S. Fleet, 18th Ed., 2005. |
| CTF-32 | Ready Force | Source Polmar Ships and Aircraft of the U.S. Fleet, 18th Ed., 2005. |
| CTF-33 | Logistics support force | Point Loma. Military Sealift Command, Pacific (MSCPAC) is responsible for MSC ships operating in the Eastern Pacific. It is dual-hatted as Commander, Task Force 33, directing the underway delivery of fuel, provisions, ordnance and towing services to Navy combatants in the U.S. 3rd Fleet area of responsibility. |
| CTF-34 | Theatre ASW force | Pearl Harbor, HI |
| CTF-35 | Surface combatant force | |
| CTF-36 | Amphibious force | |
| CTF-37 | Mine Countermeasures Group Three | |
| CTF-39 | Landing force | |

== List of commanders ==
| No. | Commander | | Term | | |
| No. | Portrait | Name | Took office | Left office | Term length |
|---|---|---|---|---|---|
| 1 | William F. Halsey Jr. | Admiral; William F. Halsey Jr. (1882–1959) | 15 March 1943 | 7 October 1945 | 2 years, 206 days |
| 2 | Howard F. Kingman | Vice Admiral; Howard F. Kingman (1890–1968) | 22 November 1945 | 30 November 1946 | 1 year, 8 days |
Inactive (1946–1973)
| 3 | William T. Rapp | Vice Admiral; William T. Rapp (1920–1988) | 1 February 1973 | August 1974 | ~1 year, 181 days |
| 4 | James H. Doyle Jr. | Vice Admiral; James H. Doyle Jr. (1925–2018) | August 1974 | July 1975 | ~334 days |
| 5 | Robert P. Coogan | Vice Admiral; Robert P. Coogan (1922–2015) | July 1975 | September 1976 | ~1 year, 62 days |
| 6 | Samuel L. Gravely Jr. | Vice Admiral; Samuel L. Gravely Jr. (1922–2014) | September 1976 | September 1978 | ~2 years, 0 days |
| 7 | Kinnaird R. McKee | Vice Admiral; Kinnaird R. McKee (1929–2013) | September 1978 | October 1979 | ~1 year, 30 days |
| 8 | Edward C. Waller III | Vice Admiral; Edward C. Waller III (1926–2021) | October 1979 | August 1981 | ~1 year, 304 days |
| 9 | Edward S. Briggs | Vice Admiral; Edward S. Briggs (1926–2022) | August 1981 | September 1981 | ~31 days |
| 10 | William P. Lawrence | Vice Admiral; William P. Lawrence (1930–2005) | September 1981 | August 1983 | ~1 year, 334 days |
| 11 | Donald S. Jones | Vice Admiral; Donald S. Jones (1928–2004) | August 1983 | August 1985 | ~2 years, 0 days |
| 12 | Thomas R. Kinnebrew | Vice Admiral; Thomas R. Kinnebrew (1930–2009) | August 1985 | September 1985 | ~31 days |
| 13 | Kendall E. Moranville | Vice Admiral; Kendall E. Moranville (1932–2001) | September 1985 | June 1986 | ~273 days |
| 14 | Diego E. Hernández | Vice Admiral; Diego E. Hernández (1934–2017) | August 1986 | January 1989 | ~2 years, 153 days |
| 15 | James F. Dorsey | Vice Admiral; James F. Dorsey (born 1934) | January 1989 | April 1991 | ~2 years, 90 days |
| 16 | Jerry L. Unruh | Vice Admiral; Jerry L. Unruh (born 1939) | April 1991 | July 1994 | ~3 years, 91 days |
| 17 | Conrad C. Lautenbacher | Vice Admiral; Conrad C. Lautenbacher (born 1942) | July 1994 | October 1996 | ~2 years, 92 days |
| 18 | Herbert A. Browne II | Vice Admiral; Herbert A. Browne II (born 1943) | October 1996 | November 1998 | ~2 years, 31 days |
| 19 | Dennis V. McGinn | Vice Admiral; Dennis V. McGinn (born 1945) | November 1998 | 6 October 2000 | ~1 year, 340 days |
| 20 | Toney M. Bucchi | Vice Admiral; Toney M. Bucchi (born 1946) | 6 October 2000 | 28 May 2003 | 2 years, 234 days |
| 21 | Michael J. McCabe | Vice Admiral; Michael J. McCabe (born 1948) | 28 May 2003 | 7 May 2005 | 1 year, 344 days |
| 22 | Barry M. Costello | Vice Admiral; Barry M. Costello (born 1951) | 7 May 2005 | 3 May 2007 | 1 year, 361 days |
| 23 | Samuel J. Locklear | Vice Admiral; Samuel J. Locklear (born 1954) | 3 May 2007 | 13 June 2009 | 2 years, 41 days |
| 24 | Richard W. Hunt | Vice Admiral; Richard W. Hunt (born 1953) | 13 June 2009 | 21 April 2011 | 1 year, 312 days |
| 25 | Gerald R. Beaman | Vice Admiral; Gerald R. Beaman (born 1952) | 21 April 2011 | 3 June 2013 | 2 years, 43 days |
| 26 | Kenneth E. Floyd | Vice Admiral; Kenneth E. Floyd (born 1958) | 3 June 2013 | 24 July 2015 | 2 years, 51 days |
| 27 | Nora W. Tyson | Vice Admiral; Nora W. Tyson (born 1957) | 24 July 2015 | 16 September 2017 | 2 years, 54 days |
| 28 | John D. Alexander | Vice Admiral; John D. Alexander (born 1959) | 16 September 2017 | 27 September 2019 | 2 years, 11 days |
| 29 | Scott D. Conn | Vice Admiral; Scott D. Conn (born 1962) | 27 September 2019 | 3 June 2021 | 1 year, 249 days |
| 30 | Stephen T. Koehler | Vice Admiral; Stephen T. Koehler (born 1964) | 3 June 2021 | 16 June 2022 | 1 year, 13 days |
| 31 | Michael E. Boyle | Vice Admiral; Michael E. Boyle (born 1965) | 16 June 2022 | 7 June 2024 | 1 year, 357 days |
| 32 | John F.G. Wade | Vice Admiral; John F.G. Wade (born 1968) | 7 June 2024 | 26 May 2026 | 1 year, 353 days |
| 33 | Marc J. Miguez | Vice Admiral; Marc J. Miguez | 20 July 2026 | Incumbent | 98 days |

== Bibliography ==
- Potter, E. B. (2005). Admiral Arliegh Burke. U.S. Naval Institute Press. ISBN 978-1-59114-692-6.
- Taylor, Theodore (1954). The Magnificent Mitscher. Naval Institute Press. ISBN 1-59114-850-2.
