= Richard Brophy =

U.S. Navy admiral

Richard T. Brophy Jr.
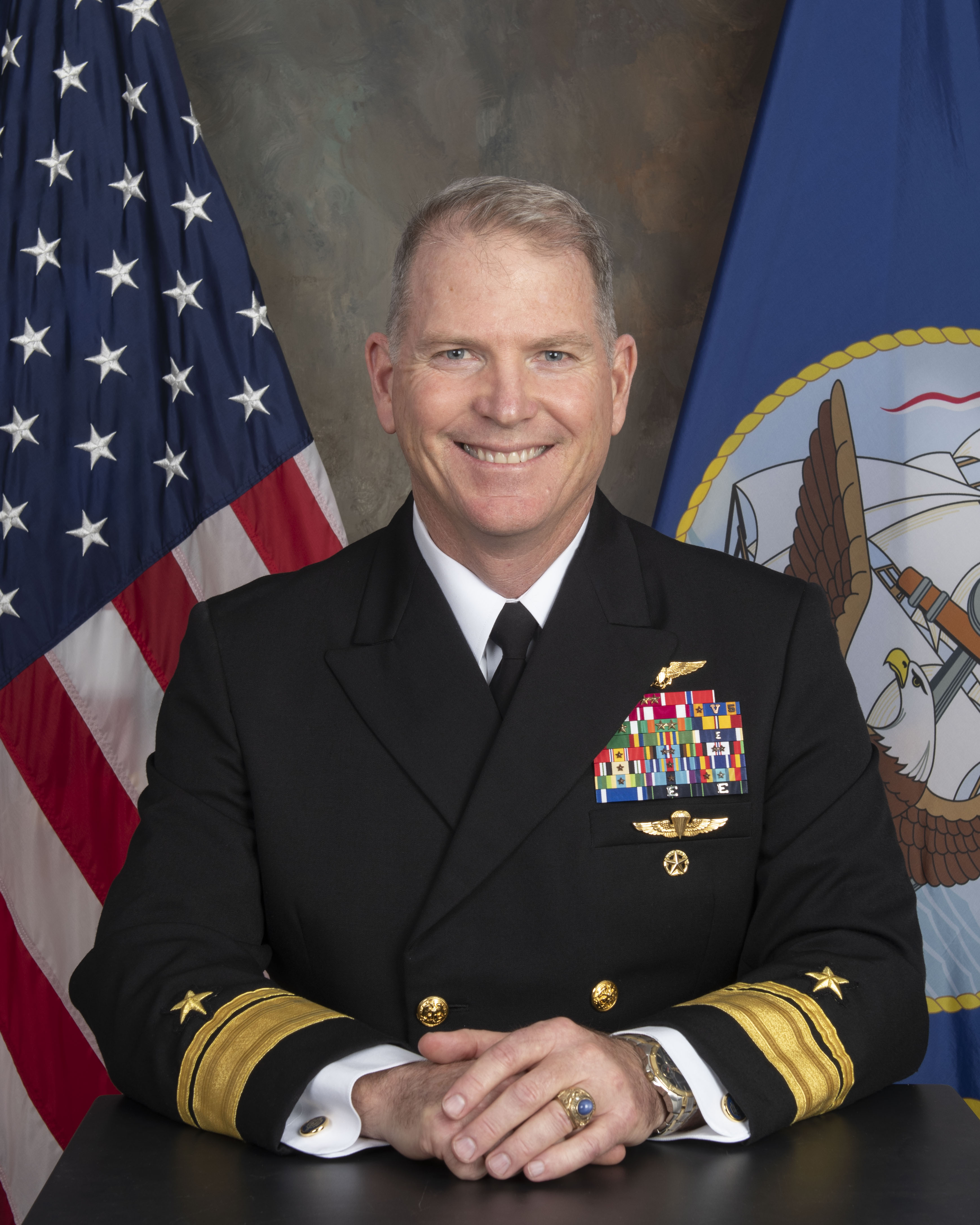
- Alma mater: United States Naval Academy (BS); Troy State University (MS); United States Navy Fighter Weapons School; United States Naval War College
- Military career
- Allegiance: United States
- Branch: United States Navy
- Service years: 1991–present
- Rank: Rear Admiral
- Nickname: Snap
- Commands: Naval Air Training Command; Carrier Strike Group 4 Naval Aviation Warfighting Development Center; Carrier Air Wing 9 VFA-115
- Awards: Legion of Merit (4); Bronze Star Medal

Richard Thomas Brophy Jr. is a United States Navy rear admiral and naval aviator who most recently served as Chief of Naval Air Training from 2022 to 2025. He previously served as commander of Carrier Strike Group 4 from 2021 to 2022, and as commander of the Naval Aviation Warfighting Development Center from 2019 to 2021, with commands of Carrier Air Wing 9 from 2015 to 2016 and Strike Fighter Squadron (VFA) 115 from 2007 to 2009.

A native of Carmel, California, Brophy was commissioned via the United States Naval Academy in 1991. He earned an M.S. degree in management from Troy State University and was designated a Naval Aviator in 1994. He graduated from the U.S. Navy Fighter Weapons School (TOPGUN), and later in 2010 earned an M.A. degree in National Security and Strategic Studies from the United States Naval War College.

In February 2023, he was nominated for promotion to rear admiral. In June 2025, he was assigned as the commander of Naval Air Force Atlantic.

Military offices
Preceded by Stuart P. Baker	Commander of Carrier Air Wing 9; 2015–2016	Succeeded by Warren E. Sisson III
Preceded by Daniel L. Cheever	Commander of the Naval Aviation Warfighting Development Center; 2019–2021	Succeeded by Max G. McCoy Jr.
Preceded by Andrew J. Loiselle	Commander of Carrier Strike Group 4; 2021–2022	Succeeded by Jeffrey J. Czerewko
Preceded by Robert D. Westendorff	Chief of Naval Air Training; 2022–2025	Succeeded by Max G. McCoy Jr.
