= John D. Alexander (admiral) =

Retired U.S. Navy admiral

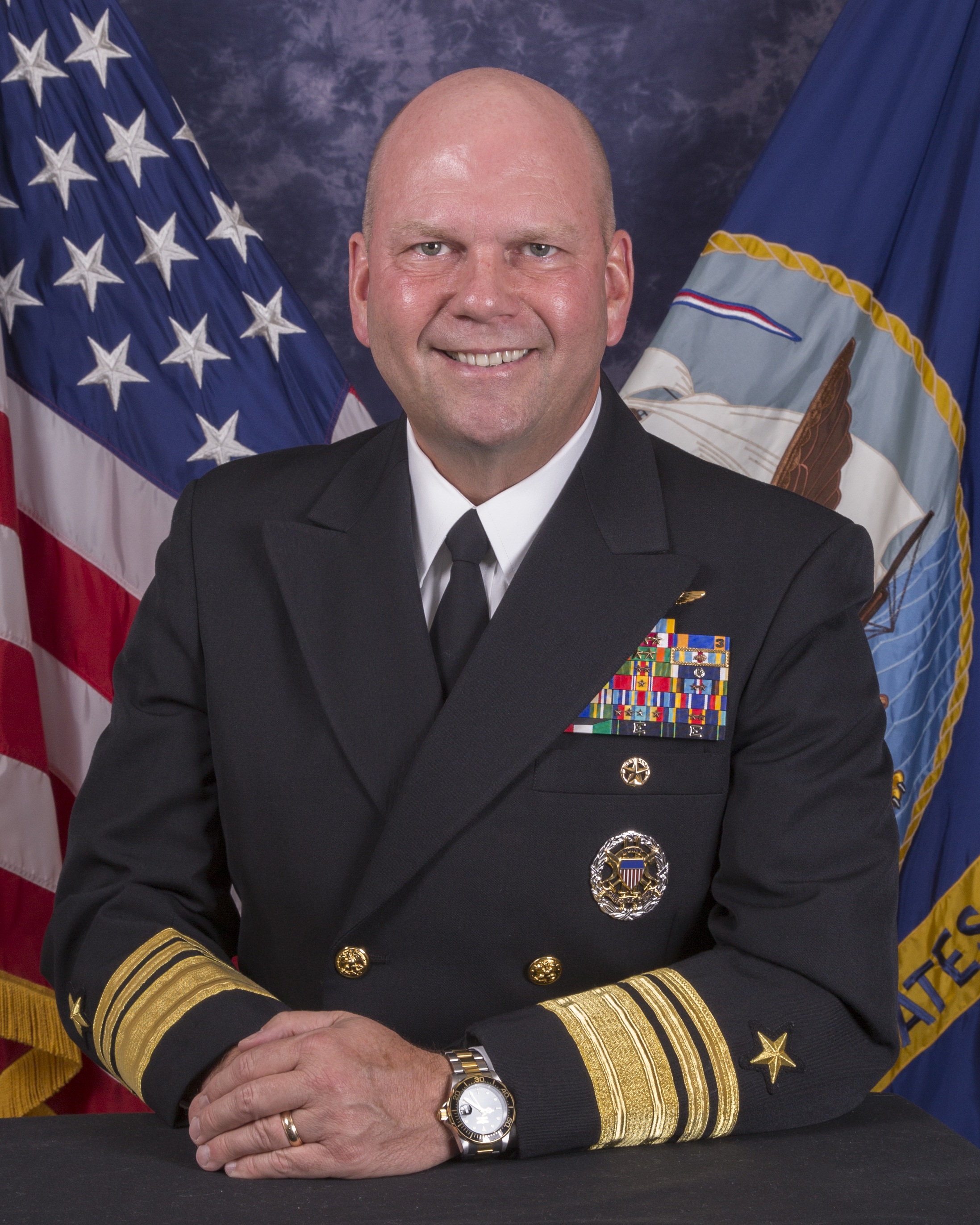
- Born: 1959 (age 66–67)
- Education: Texas Tech University (BS); King's College (MA); Royal Naval Staff College
- Military career
- Allegiance: United States of America
- Branch: United States Navy
- Service years: 1982–2019
- Rank: Vice Admiral
- Nickname: Sarge
- Commands: United States Third Fleet; Battle Force, U.S. Seventh Fleet; USS Abraham Lincoln (CVN-72); USS Juneau (LPD-10); VAQ-135
- Awards: Navy Distinguished Service Medal; Defense Superior Service Medal; Legion of Merit (5)

John David Alexander (born 1959) is a retired United States Navy vice admiral and naval flight officer who last served as the 29th commander of the United States Third Fleet from September 15, 2017 to September 27, 2019. Prior to that, he held command tours as the commanding officer of USS Abraham Lincoln (CVN-72) from January 2010 to September 2012, and commanding officer of the USS Juneau (LPD-10) from 2006 to 2007.

A native of Port Neches, Texas, Alexander graduated from the Aviation Officer Candidate School program in December 1982 and was designated a naval flight officer in November 1983. He graduated with a B.S. degree in Mechanical Engineering from Texas Tech University and an M.A. degree in Defense Studies from King’s College of the University of London as well as completing the Royal Naval Staff College Course, Greenwich (UK) and the U.S. Navy Nuclear Propulsion Program.

Military offices
Preceded by Ronald Horton	Commanding Officer of USS Juneau (LPD-10); 2006–2007	Succeeded by Kent D. Whalen
Preceded by Patrick D. Hall	Commanding Officer of USS Abraham Lincoln (CVN-72); 2010–2012	Succeeded by Karl O. Thomas
Preceded by Nora W. Tyson	Commander of the United States Third Fleet; 2017–2019	Succeeded by Scott D. Conn
