= Andrew Loiselle =

U.S. Navy admiral

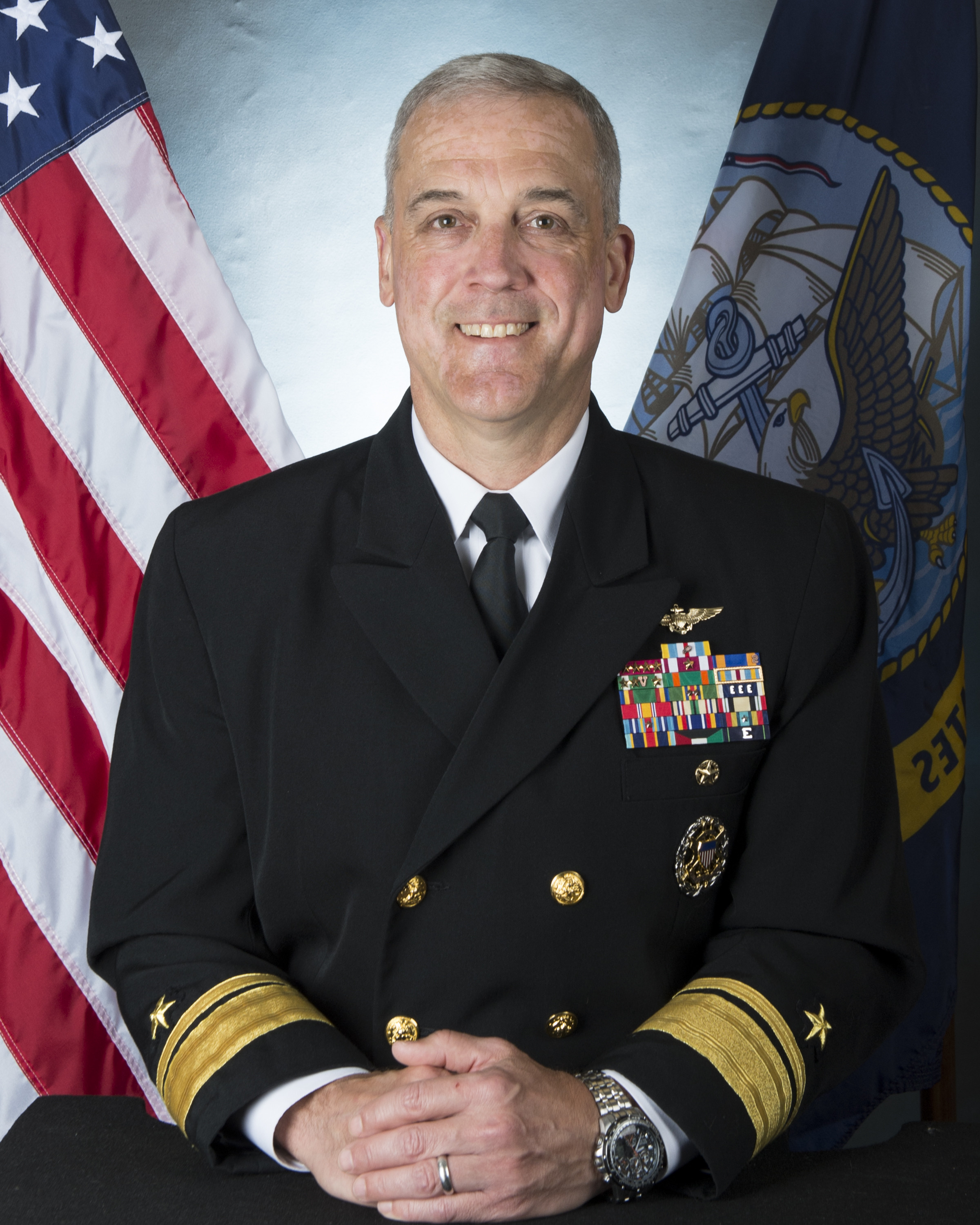
- Official portrait, 2021
- Born: 1966 (age 59–60)
- Military career
- Allegiance: United States
- Branch: United States Navy
- Service years: 1988–2023
- Rank: Rear Admiral
- Commands: Commander Strike Group 4 Carrier Strike Group 8 USS George H.W. Bush (CVN-77); USS Gunston Hall (LSD-44); VFA-146
- Conflicts: Gulf War; Iraq War
- Awards: Defense Superior Service Medal (2); Legion of Merit (5)

Andrew Joseph Loiselle (born 1966) is a retired United States Navy rear admiral who served as the Director of Air Warfare from August 18, 2021 to August 3, 2023. Previously, he was Commander of Carrier Strike Group 4 from June 15, 2020, to May 17, 2021.

Raised in Cranston, Rhode Island, Loiselle graduated from Assumption College in 1988 with a bachelor's degree in mathematics. After completing flight school, he was designated a naval aviator in January 1991. Loiselle later earned an executive Master of Business Administration degree from the Naval Postgraduate School in June 2004. He is also a graduate of the navy's nuclear power school.

Military offices
Preceded by Eugene H. Black III	Commander of Carrier Strike Group 8; 2019–2020	Succeeded by Ryan Scholl
Preceded by Daniel Cheever	Commander of Carrier Strike Group 4; 2020–2021	Succeeded by Richard Brophy
Preceded by William S. Dillon	Director of Air Warfare of the United States Navy; 2021–2023	Succeeded by Michael P. Donnelly
