= Commander Strike Force Training Atlantic =

Commander, Carrier Strike Group FOUR
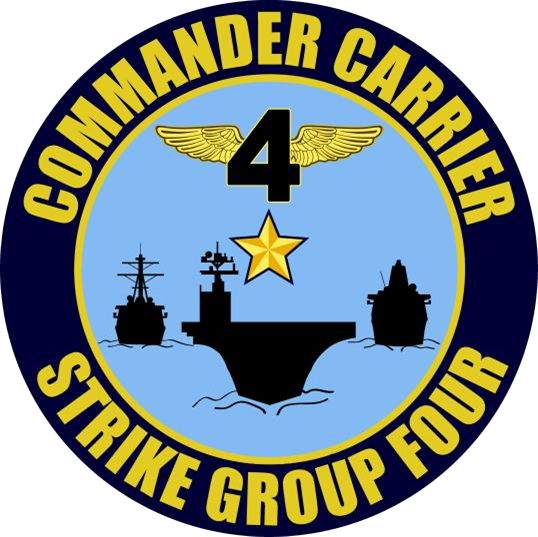
- Current crest of Carrier Strike Group Four
- Active: c. 1940
- Country: United States of America
- Branch: United States Navy
- Type: Fleet
- Role: Atlantic Fleet Integrated/Advanced Training
- Part of: U.S. Fleet Forces Command
- Garrison/HQ: Naval Station Norfolk

Commanders
- Current commander: RDML Michael T. Spencer

Commander, Carrier Strike Group FOUR (CCSG-4 or COMSTRKGRUFOUR) is the U.S. Fleet Forces Command formation charged with training and certifying Atlantic Fleet Carrier Strike Groups, Amphibious Ready Groups, and independently deploying surface ships. Its mission is to "Conduct safe and effective Strike Force Training of the Atlantic Fleet."

From 2004 to 2014, The command was known as Commander, Strike Force Training Atlantic (CSFTL or COMSTRKFORTRALANT)

Until 2004, The command was known as Carrier Group FOUR/Commander, Carrier Striking Force (CCG-4).

CCSG-4 is a one star command under the three-star Deputy Commander, U.S. Fleet Forces Command, and is based at Naval Station Norfolk, Virginia. Tactical Training Group, Atlantic (TTGL) and Expeditionary Warfare Training Group, Atlantic (EWTGL) are subordinate commands.

== History ==
Carrier Division Four was initially activated as an element of the United States Fifth Fleet on 13 March 1943. Seeing extensive action throughout the Second World War, Carrier Division Four was embarked in many of the most famous aircraft carriers in the Pacific Theater: USS Bunker Hill (CV-17), USS Intrepid (CV-11), USS Independence (CVL-22), USS Franklin (CV-13), USS Cabot (CVL-28), and USS Lake Champlain (CV-39). As a major participant in the Marshall Islands Campaign, the Battle of Leyte Gulf, and the Battle off Cape Engaño, planes under the direction of Carrier Division Four, aboard the USS Intrepid, sank Japanese aircraft carriers Zuiho, Zuikaku, and Chiyoda. Other notable victories include the sinking of the battleship Yamato and naval support during the Battle of Okinawa.

Following World War II, Carrier Division Four was transferred to the Atlantic Fleet. In October 1955, Carrier Division Four assumed administrative command of the world's first super-carrier, USS Forrestal (CVA 59). USS Saratoga (CVA-60) joined the Division in 1956, making Carrier Division Four the first task group composed solely of super-carriers. Subsequent operations laid the foundation for tactical employment of carriers well into the next decade.

Commander, Carrier Division Four boarded the USS Forrestal in July 1965 and deployed to the Mediterranean, where it transferred to the USS Franklin D Roosevelt and returned to Norfolk in December 1965. It did two or three additional Mediterranean Sea cruises on USS Independence and USS America before January 1969 (exact dates and sequence not known).

Carrier Division Four was re-designated Carrier Group Four in July 1973. It was responsible for facilitating the Navy's transition from traditional battle force tactics to the modern day battle group concept, emphasizing the Commander's responsibility for the whole battle group (destroyers, submarines, and auxiliaries) and not just the carrier and air wing.

Carrier Group Four conducted two deployments to the Mediterranean in the late seventies and embarked USS Dwight D. Eisenhower (CVN-69) in the Indian Ocean during the 1980 Iranian Hostage Crisis. In 1983, Carrier Group FOUR served in the Second, Sixth, and Seventh Fleets on USS Carl Vinson's (CVN-70) maiden cruise.

In October 1984, Commander, Carrier Group FOUR began working for Commander, Naval Air Force, U.S. Atlantic Fleet, as the primary readiness and training flag staff. Additionally, Commander, Carrier Group FOUR reported to Commander, Second Fleet in the NATO role of Commander, Striking Fleet Atlantic, performing operational tasking as described in the Maritime Strategy and NATO's Concept of Maritime Operations. In that capacity, Carrier Group FOUR was again re-designated as Commander, Carrier Striking Force.

In 1985, Carrier Group FOUR embarked USS Yorktown (CG 48) for the first live missile firing to include command/control/target tracking from a platform different than the missile-firing ship. In late summer, Commander, Carrier Group FOUR embarked USS America (CV-66) for NATO exercise OCEAN SAFARI 85, successfully conducting the first carrier flight operations in a Norwegian fjord. This led to an entirely new concept of tactical operations for the Carrier Battle Group.

From 1987 to 1989, Carrier Group FOUR conducted seven Advanced Phase Training operations for Atlantic Fleet Carrier Battle Groups in preparations for their deployments and participated in NATO exercises OCEAN SAFARI 87, TEAM WORK 88, and NORTH STAR 89. In May 1989, the Staff embarked in USS Mount Whitney (LCC-20) for SOLID SHIELD 89, a joint service exercise which introduced the first employment of an embarked naval commander as Joint Force Air Component Commander (JFACC).

In response to Operation Desert Shield, Carrier Group FOUR successfully certified two carriers and their air wings for deployment on short notice, without the necessity of full Fleet exercise training.

In February 1991, the command was given the additional responsibility of conducting joint operations aimed at interdicting the flow of narcotics from South America as Commander, Task Group 4.1. From July 1994 to September 1994, Commander, Carrier Group FOUR was ordered to Saudi Arabia as Deputy Commander, Joint Task Force Southwest Asia, in support of Operation Southern Watch.

Commander, Carrier Striking Force's NATO participation included NORTH STAR 91, TEAM WORK 92, and STRONG RESOLVE 95. For STRONG RESOLVE 95, Commander, Carrier Striking Force acted as the JFACC for part one of the exercise, successfully introducing this concept to NATO.

From September 1996 to July 1997, Commander, Carrier Group FOUR completed two Advanced Phase Training exercises and developed and conducted two Carrier Battle Group Comprehensive Training Unit Exercises (COMPTUEXs).

In October 2004, CCG4 was re-designated Commander Strike Force Training Atlantic (CSFTL) and was, again, reorganized to work for Commander, Second Fleet (COMSECONDFLT) as the Atlantic Fleet integrated training lead. With the disestablishment of COMSECONDFLT on 30 September 2011, CSFTL was assigned directly to U.S. Fleet Forces Command as an Echelon III command, and was tasked to enable, mentor and assess integrated tactical training in order to ensure the warfighting primacy of Atlantic Fleet Naval Forces. Administratively aligned under CSFTL are the following commands: Tactical Training Group Atlantic (TTGL) and Expeditionary Warfare Training Group Atlantic (EWTGL).

Strike Force Training, Atlantic held a change of command ceremony in Norfolk 23 Sept. 2013.

Rear Adm. Scott A. Stearney relieved Rear Adm. Scott T. Craig as commander. On 29 April 2014, CSFTL was re-designated Commander, Carrier Strike Group Four (CCSG 4). The mission of CCSG-4 is to execute, mentor, and assess At-Sea (Live), Synthetic and Academic scenario-based integrated training of Atlantic Fleet CSGs, ARGs, independent deployers, and other designated groups, enabling them to operate in integrated, joint, and coalition environments in the conduct of combatant commander tasking.

Rear Adm. Richard W. Butler relieved Rear. Adm. Scott A. Stearney as commander of Carrier Strike Group 4 (CSG4), 31 July 2014, during a change of command ceremony at Naval Station Norfolk.

On 29 April 2014, Commander Strike Force Training Atlantic (CSFTL) was re-designated Commander, Carrier Strike Group Four (CCSG 4).

== Major exercises ==
CCSG-4 trains carrier strike groups and Independent deployers primarily during Composite Training Unit Exercises (COMPTUX), Force Protection Exercises and Joint Training Force Exercises (JTFEX) off the eastern seaboard of the U.S. CCSG-4 also trains Amphibious Ready Groups (ARG) with their embarked Marine Expeditionary Units (MEU), as well as other surface combatants not associated with a CSG or ARG. CCSG-4 participates in United Kingdom led Joint Warrior exercises twice per year.

Composite Training Unit Exercises are designed to integrate all warfare areas of the CSG or ARG/MEU. Force Protection Exercises are designed to certify deploying units in land, air and waterside attacks for two years allowing them to conduct ports of call while deployed in OCONUS.

JTFEXs provides the Strike Group with realistic training in joint operations prior to deployment. The exercise requires integration of the CSG's existing warfighting ability with other Joint and Combined assets to support warfare under a challenging threat scenario. Upon successful completion, CCSG-4 recommends deployment certification to Commander, U.S. Fleet Forces.

In addition, Fleet Synthetic Training (FST) is used throughout the training cycle to prepare units to go to sea. Synthetic training utilizes simulators and role players, and prepares units to go to sea at considerable savings (in fuel, material, etc.)

In July 2010 CCSG-4 ran a Composite Unit Training Exercise for the USS Kearsarge group which was combined with training for the Royal Navy's Ark Royal Carrier Strike Group under Commodore Simon Ancona and the Amphibious Task Group build around HMS Ocean.

In November 2022 the destroyer USS Thomas Hudner joined the new aircraft carrier USS Gerald R. Ford as part of Carrier Strike Group Four operating in the Atlantic Ocean with multiple other nations. This was the carrier's first time leading a Strike Group. The Strike Group also included the Ticonderoga-class cruiser USS Normandy, and her sister ships USS Ramage and USS McFaul. CSG 4 participated in a NATO Task Force Exercise along with ships from other NATO nations including HMCS Fredericton, a Halifax-class frigate of the Royal Canadian Navy, the FGS Hessen, a Sachsen-class frigate of the German Navy, and the Spanish frigate Álvaro de Bazán, the lead ship for a class of air defense frigate. They arrived at Portsmouth, England, on 14 November 2022.

== Previous commanders ==
- Rear Admiral Reynold D. Hogle, 25 September 1961 – 8 November 1962
- Rear Admiral John Joseph Hyland Jr., 8 November 1962 – ?
- Rear Admiral Allan F. Fleming
- Rear Admiral Dick H. Guinn, December 1965 – May 1967
- Rear Admiral Lawrence R. Geis
- Rear Admiral Donald D. Engen, 1971
- Rear Admiral Robert B. Fuller, June 1980 – March 1982
- Rear Admiral Kendall E. Moranville, 1981
- Rear Admiral Richard J. O'Hanlon, 2005 – 13 September 2007
- Rear Admiral Donald P. Quinn, 2007 – 2009
- Rear Admiral Gerry White, 2009 – 2010
- Rear Admiral Dennis Fitzpatrick, 2010 – 2012
- Rear Admiral Scott T. Craig, 2012 – 2013
- Rear Admiral Scott A. Stearney, 2013 – 2014
- Rear Admiral Richard W. Butler, 2014 – 2015
- Rear Admiral Bruce H. Lindsey, 2015 – 2016
- Rear Admiral Scott D. Conn, 2016 – 2017
- Rear Admiral Kenneth R. Whitesell, 2017 – 2019
- Rear Admiral Daniel L. Cheever, 2019 – 2020
- Rear Admiral Andrew J. Loiselle, 2020 – 2021
- Rear Admiral Richard T. Brophy, 2021 – 2022
- Rear Admiral Jeffrey J. Czerewko, 2022 – 2023
- Rear Admiral Max G. McCoy Jr., 2023 – 2025
- Rear Admiral Michael T. Spencer, 2025 – present

== Bibliography ==
- Sheehy, Edward (1992). The U.S. Navy, the Mediterranean, and the Cold War, 1945-1947. Westport, CT: Greenwood Press.
- Toomey, David (2003). Stormchasers. New York: Norton.

== See also ==
- History of the United States Navy
