= USS Rigel (AF-58) =

Cargo ship of the United States Navy

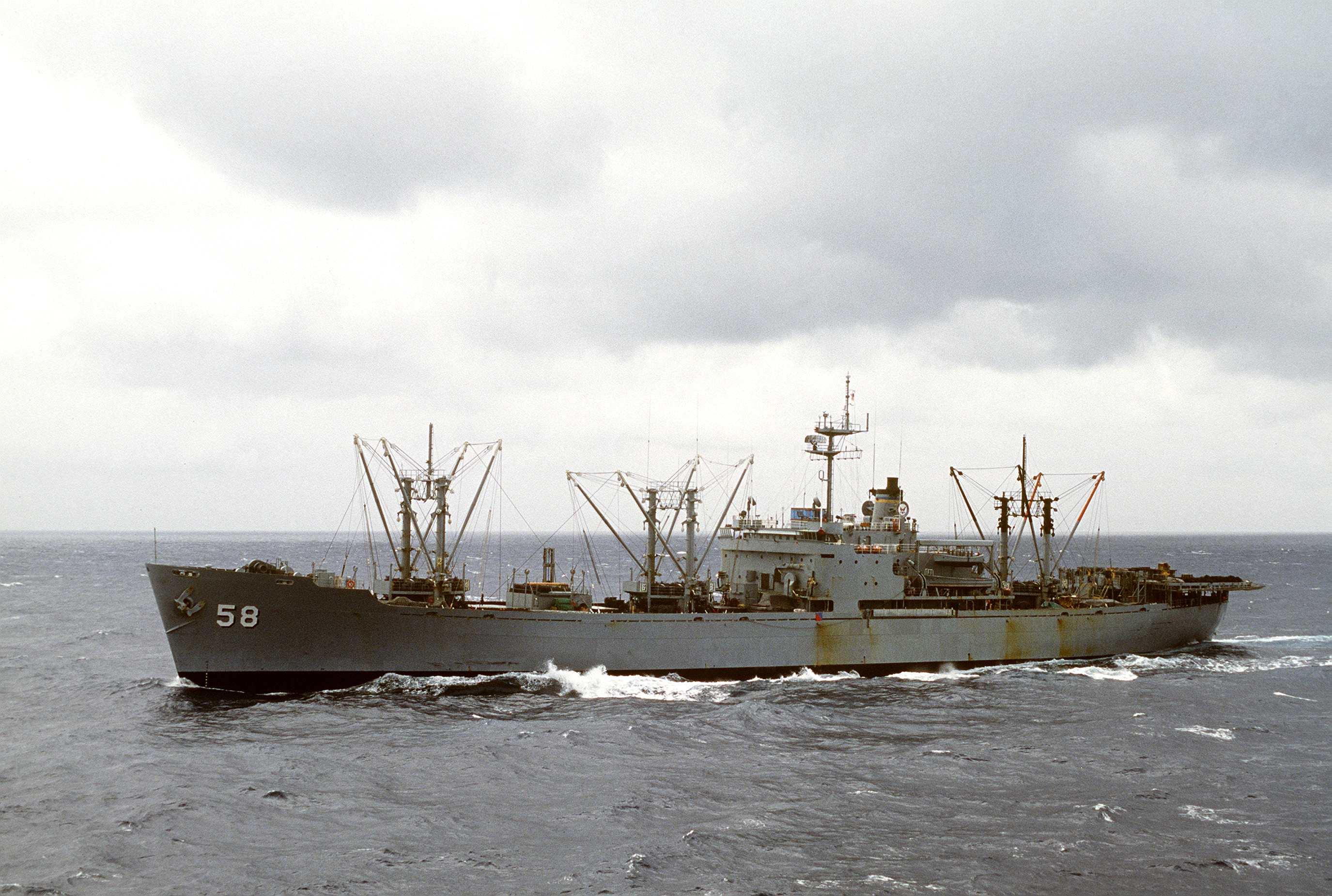

History

United States
- Ordered: R3-S-4A hull, MA hull 36
- Laid down: 15 March 1954
- Launched: 15 March 1955
- Commissioned: 2 September 1955
- Decommissioned: June 1975
- In service: as USNS Rigel (T-AF-58), 23 June 1975
- Out of service: 1992
- Stricken: 16 May 1994
- Identification: IMO number: 8835530; Callsign: NQSI
- Fate: Scrapped in late 2008

General characteristics
- Displacement: 15,150 tons(fl)
- Length: 502 ft (153 m)
- Beam: 72 ft (22 m)
- Draught: 29 ft (8.8 m)
- Propulsion: 600psi cross compound steam turbine, single propeller
- Speed: 21 kts.
- Complement: 350 (USS crew)
- Armament: four dual mount 3 in (76 mm) gun mounts

USS Rigel (AF-58) was a Rigel-class stores ship acquired by the U.S. Navy. Her task was to carry stores, refrigerated items, and equipment to ships in the fleet, and to remote stations and staging areas.

== Operational history ==
The second ship to be named Rigel by the Navy, AF-58 was laid down under Maritime Administration contract 15 March 1954 by the Ingalls Shipbuilding Corp., Pascagoula, Mississippi; launched 15 March 1955; sponsored by Mrs. Austin K. Doyle; and commissioned 2 September 1955.

=== U.S. Navy (1955-1975) ===
The first of a new class of high-speed, large-capacity, fully refrigerated stores issue ships, Rigel completed shakedown out of Newport, Rhode Island, and her homeport of Norfolk, Virginia. In February 1956, she sailed south for the first time; underwent further training in Cuban and Puerto Rican waters; and into the fall provided logistic support along the mid-Atlantic seaboard and in the Caribbean. In late fall (14 November-9 December), she completed her first U.S. 6th Fleet deployment which included her initiation in her primary mission - replenishment at sea.

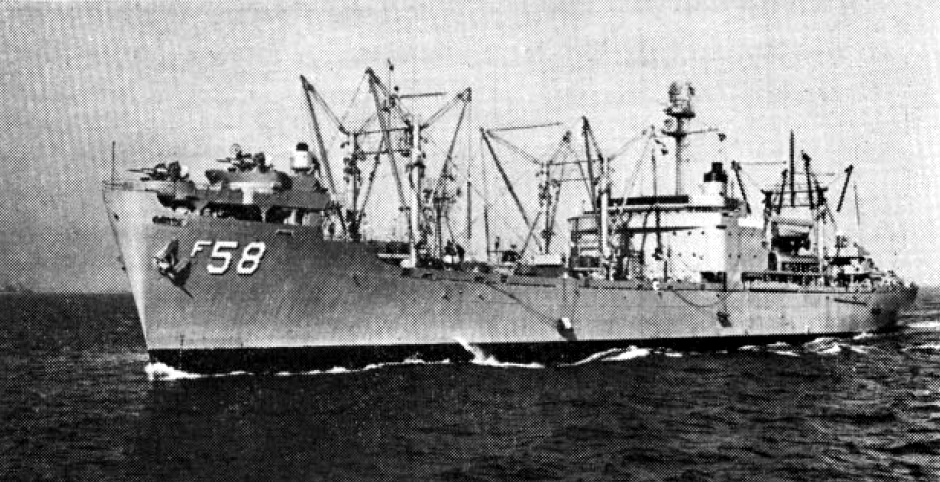
USS Rigel (AF-58), circa 1958.

During the winter of 1957, she spent 2 months in the Caribbean, then sailed east, in May, for 4 months in the Mediterranean. January 1958 brought a return to the Caribbean, followed in March by the initiation of a regular schedule of 6-week replenishment deployments to the Mediterranean with intervening periods spent in loading, upkeep, training, and shipyard overhauls. On her second and third deployments of that year, she directly supported units of the U.S. 6th Fleet sent to Lebanon at the request of that country's president.

Rigel maintained her regular Mediterranean logistic deployment schedule through the 1960s. Interruptions came with the replenishment of units engaged in good will visits to West Africa (January 1961); exercises off Iceland and Canada (June 1962, June 1965); and crises in the Caribbean - the Cuban Missile Crisis in November 1962 and the Dominican Republic crisis in May 1965.

Rigel was fitted out with an amidships helicopter platform in 1961, thus providing her with a vertical replenishment capability. Two years later, that platform was replaced with one on her fantail to simplify the pilots' problems when landing aboard or conducting replenishments. Rigel served until decommissioned on 23 June 1975.

=== Military Sealift Command (1975-1992) ===
Rigel was placed in service by the Military Sealift Command (MSC) as USNS Rigel (T-AF-58), 23 June 1975. She continued operating with the MSC, resupplying U.S. Navy ships until 1992.

=== Decommissioning and fate (1992-2008) ===
Rigel was struck from the Navy list on 16 May 1994, and was transferred to the Maritime Administration. She was laid up in the James River Reserve Fleet on 1 April 1998 off Fort Eustis, Virginia (USA). In 2008, she was finally sold to All Star Metals for $469,626 and scrapped in Brownsville, Texas (USA).

== Military awards and honors ==
Rigel’s crew was eligible for the following medals:

- Navy Expeditionary Medal
- National Defense Service Medal
- Armed Forces Expeditionary Medal
- Southwest Asia Service Medal
