= Michael P. Holland =

U.S. Navy admiral

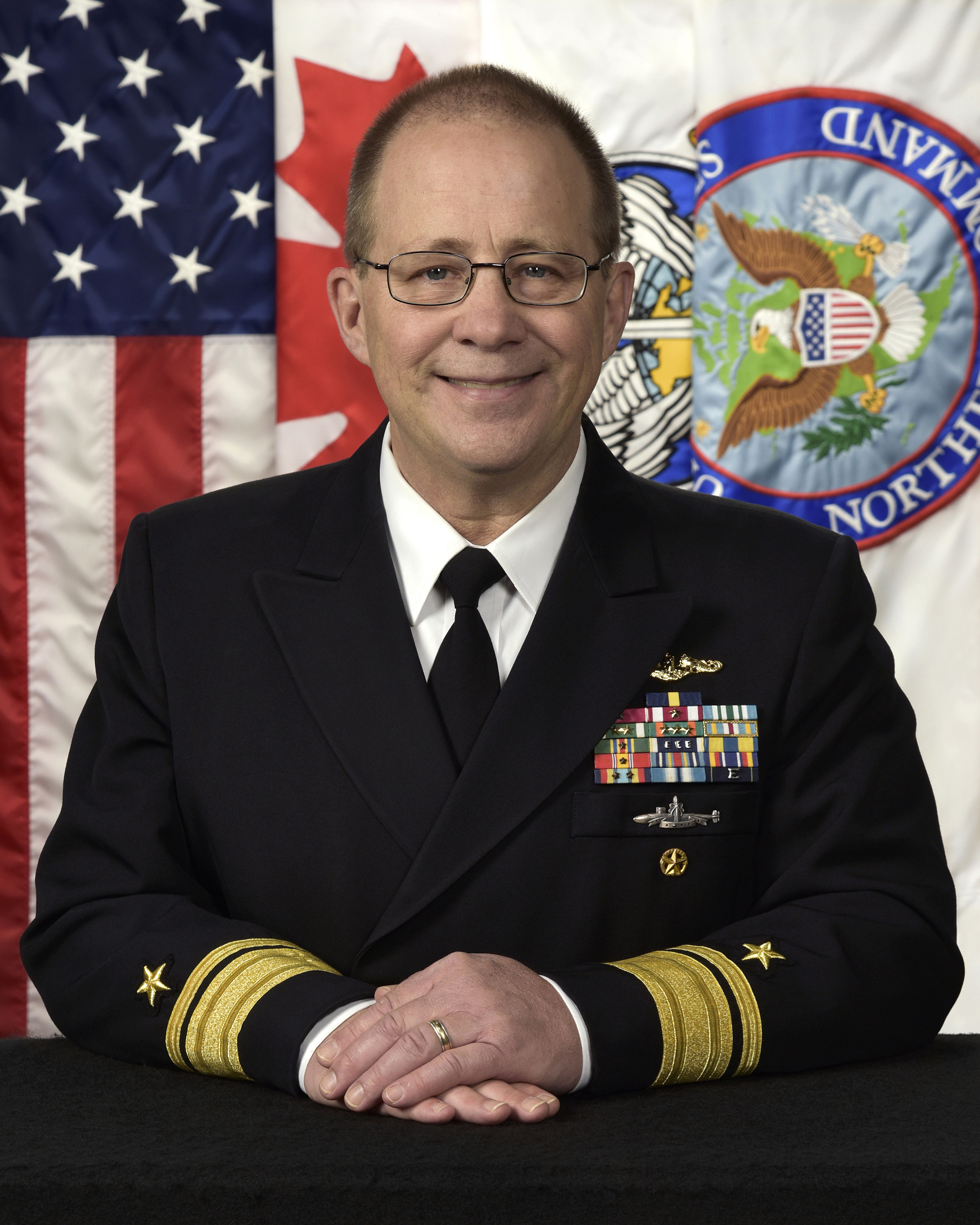
- Born: 1964 (age 61–62)
- Military career
- Allegiance: United States
- Branch: United States Navy
- Service years: 1987–2022
- Rank: Rear Admiral
- Commands: Submarine Group 10; USS Providence (SSN-719)
- Awards: Navy Distinguished Service Medal; Legion of Merit (2)

Michael Paul Holland (born 1964) is a retired United States Navy rear admiral who most recently served as the Chief of Staff of the United States Northern Command. Previously, he was the Director of Programming of the United States Navy. Holland earned a bachelor's degree from Montana State University in 1987.

Military offices
Preceded by Randy B. Crites	Commander of Submarine Group 10; 2017–2018	Succeeded by Jeffrey Jablon
Preceded by Austin E. Renforth; Acting	Chief of Staff of the North American Aerospace Defense Command and United States Northern Command; 2020–2022	Succeeded by Daniel Cheever
