= John Gumbleton =

U.S. Navy admiral

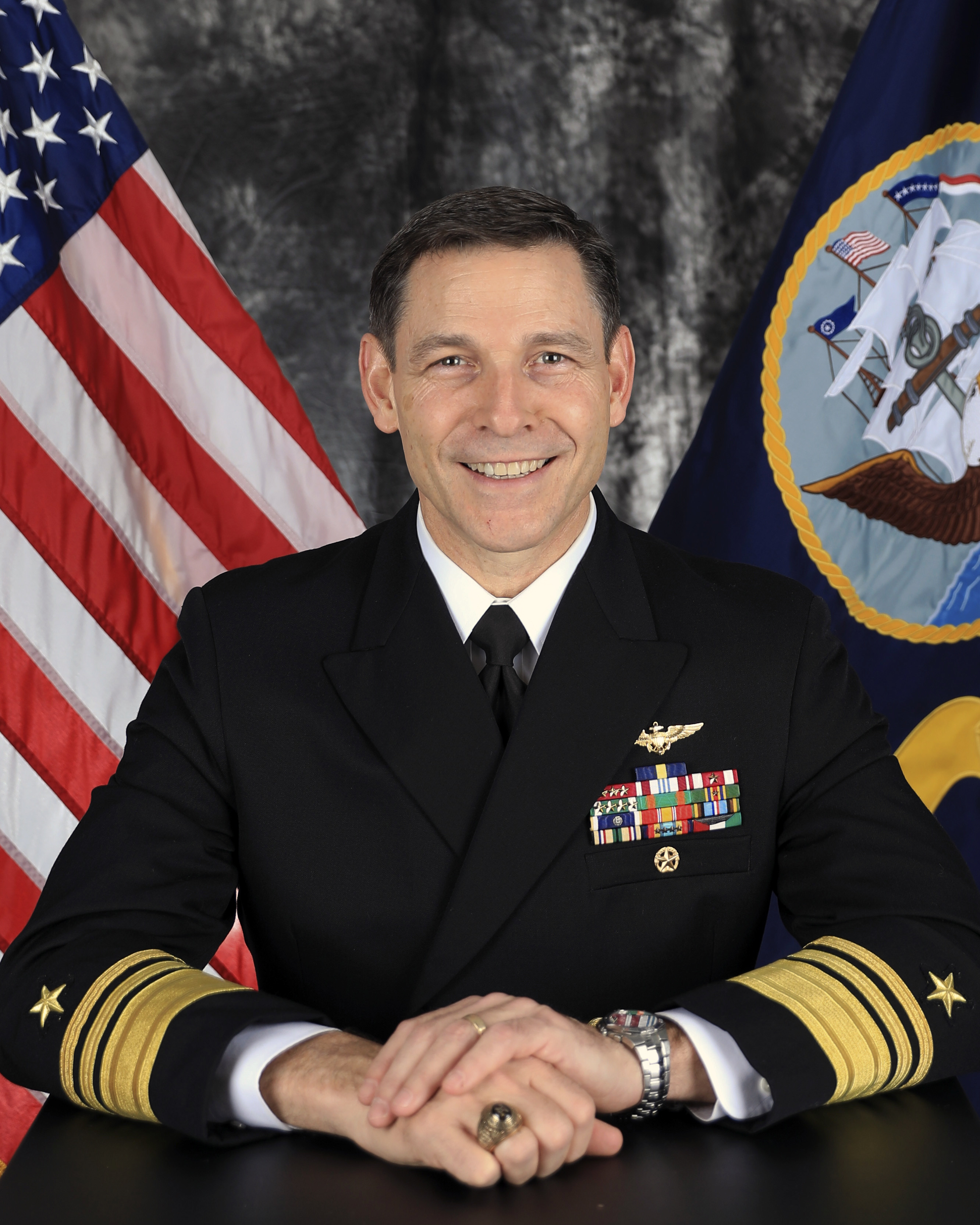
- Official portrait, 2024
- Born: 1967 (age 58–59); Baltimore, Maryland, U.S.
- Military career
- Allegiance: United States
- Branch: United States Navy
- Service years: 1989–2026
- Rank: Vice Admiral
- Commands: Helicopter Anti-Submarine Squadron Light 48 (HSL-48); USS Boxer (LHD-4); Expeditionary Strike Group 3; Task Force 80; United States Fleet Forces Command (acting)

John E. Gumbleton (born 1967) is a retired United States Navy vice admiral.

== Education ==
Raised in Falmouth, Massachusetts, Gumbleton graduated from Falmouth High School in 1985. He then earned a B.S. degree in environmental engineering from Norwich University in 1989. Commissioned in May 1989, Gumbleton was designated a naval aviator in October 1990 after completing flight school. He later received an M.S. degree in information systems from George Washington University and an M.A. degree in national security and strategic studies from the Naval War College.

== Career ==
Gumbleton's early sea assignments included service with HSL-44, deploying aboard USS Samuel B. Roberts (FFG-58) and USS Vicksburg (CG-69). During two tours with HSL-46, he deployed aboard USS Ticonderoga (CG-47) and USS Taylor (FFG-50), serving as a detachment officer-in-charge and squadron operations officer. He later commanded Helicopter Anti-Submarine Squadron Light 48 (HSL-48) and USS Boxer (LHD-4).

His shore assignments included service at the Bureau of Naval Personnel and Naval Air Systems Command. He served as a legislative fellow for Senator John Warner, a congressional liaison officer in the Appropriations Matters Office, and a military assistant to the deputy assistant chief of staff at Allied Command Transformation's Staff Element Europe. He also served as a senior fellow with Strategic Studies Group 34 and director of the Operations Division in the Office of the Budget.

His flag assignments included director of Maritime Headquarters for U.S. Naval Forces Europe and Africa and the U.S. Sixth Fleet. He commanded Expeditionary Strike Group 3 from 2019 to 13 April 2020. On 1 May 2020, he assumed duties as deputy assistant secretary of the Navy for budget and director of fiscal management of the United States Navy. He also served as chief of staff to the chief of naval operations and vice chief of naval operations.

In April 2023, Gumbleton was nominated for promotion to vice admiral and assignment as deputy commander of United States Fleet Forces Command. He assumed duties as deputy commander and commander of Task Force 80 on 12 January 2024.

When Daryl Caudle relinquished command of Fleet Forces Command on 6 August 2025 to become chief of naval operations, Gumbleton succeeded him as acting commander. He served in that capacity until 1 December 2025, when Admiral Karl Thomas assumed command.

In 2026, Gumbleton served as the ranking officer for the United States' 250th anniversary celebration in Boston, Massachusetts. His retirement ceremony was held on 31 July 2026.

== Awards and decorations ==
Gumbleton's awards and decorations include:

- Navy Distinguished Service Medal.
- Legion of Merit.
- Defense Meritorious Service Medal.
- Meritorious Service Medal.
- Navy and Marine Corps Commendation Medal.
- Navy and Marine Corps Achievement Medal.
- Navy Unit Commendation.
- Navy “E” Ribbon.
- National Defense Service Medal.
- Global War on Terrorism Service Medal.
- Sea Service Deployment Ribbon.
- Kuwait Liberation Medal (Kuwait).

His qualification insignia include the Naval Aviator insignia and Command at Sea insignia.

Military offices
Preceded by Cedric E. Pringle	Commander of Expeditionary Strike Group 3; 2019–2020	Succeeded by Philip E. Sobeck
Preceded by ???	Deputy Assistant Secretary of the Navy for Budget and Director of Fiscal Management of the United States Navy; 2020–2023	Succeeded by Benjamin G. Reynolds
Preceded by James Kilby	Deputy Commander of United States Fleet Forces Command; 2024–present	Incumbent
Preceded by Daryl Caudle	Commander of United States Fleet Forces Command; Acting; 2025	Succeeded by Karl O. Thomas
