= Daryl Caudle =

American admiral (born 1963)

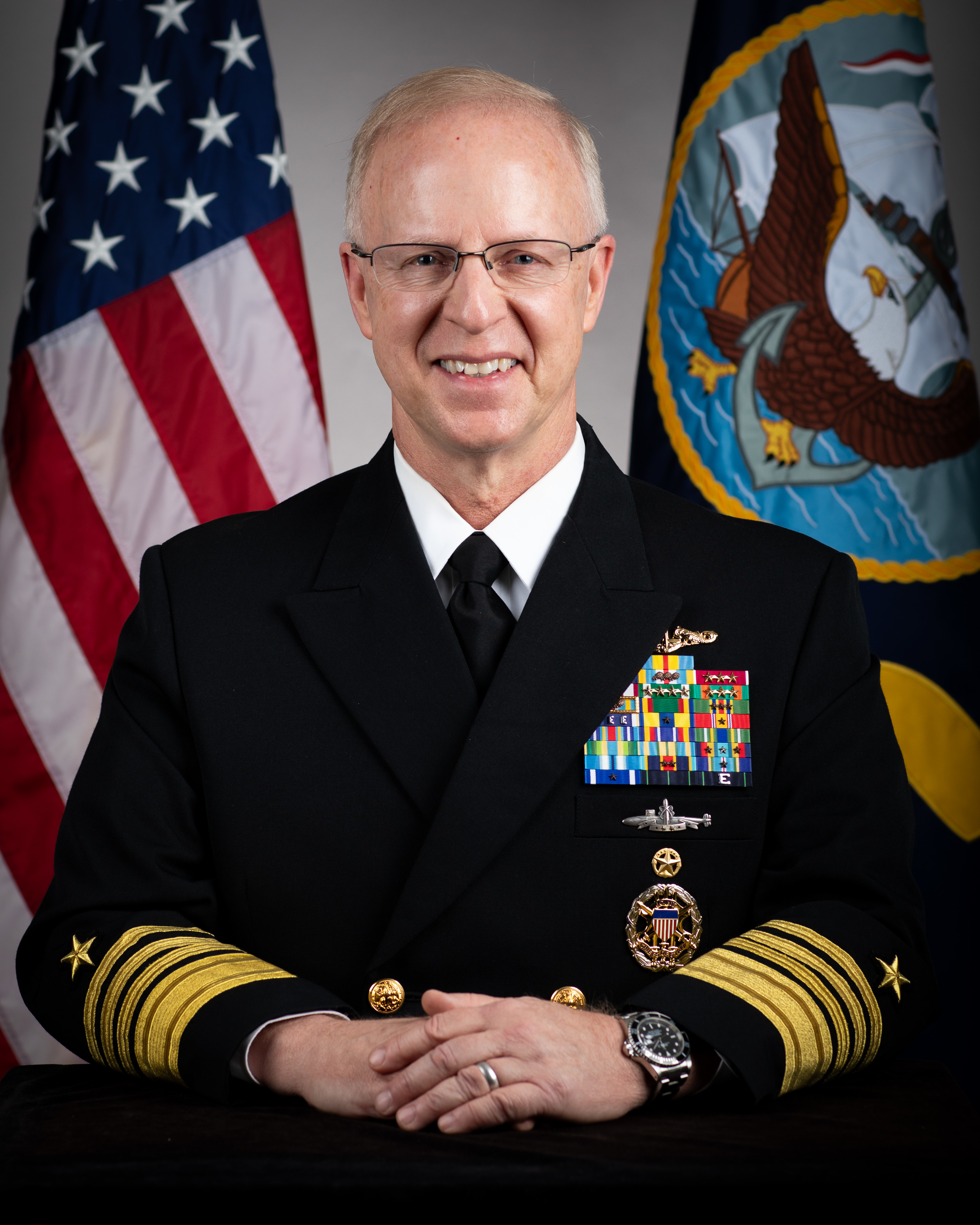
- Official portrait, 2025
- Born: 1963 (age 62–63); Winston-Salem, North Carolina, U.S.
- Education: North Carolina State University (BS); Naval Postgraduate School (MS); Old Dominion University (MS); University of Phoenix (DM)
- Military career
- Allegiance: United States
- Branch: United States Navy
- Service years: 1985–present
- Rank: Admiral
- Commands: Chief of Naval Operations; United States Fleet Forces Command; Submarine Force Atlantic; Submarine Force, U.S. Pacific Fleet; Allied Submarine Command; Task Force 114; Task Force 88; Task Force 46; Task Force 134; Submarine Squadron 3 USS Helena (SSN-725); USS Topeka (SSN-754); USS Jefferson City (SSN-759)
- Conflicts: War against Islamic State; Operation Inherent Resolve; Second Libyan civil war; Operation Odyssey Lightning
- Awards: Defense Distinguished Service Medal; Navy Distinguished Service Medal; Defense Superior Service Medal (4); Legion of Merit (4)

Daryl Lane Caudle (born 1963) is an American admiral and engineer who has served as the 34th chief of naval operations since 2025.

Caudle was born in North Carolina. He graduated from the Officer Candidate School of the United States Navy in 1985, and holds degrees in the fields of engineering and physics from North Carolina State University, Old Dominion University, the University of Phoenix, and the Naval Postgraduate School. He is also a licensed professional engineer.

He has commanded three submarines. His senior assignments have included Commander, Submarine Force, Pacific Fleet; Vice Director for Strategy, Plans, and Policy on the Joint Staff (J-5) in Washington, D.C.; concurrent terms as Commander, Naval Submarine Forces, Submarine Force Atlantic, and Allied Submarine Command from 2019 to 2021; and Commander, United States Fleet Forces Command, from 2021 to 2025.

Caudle directed air attacks during Operation Inherent Resolve and Operation Odyssey Lightning.

== Early life and education ==
Caudle was born in 1963 in Winston-Salem, North Carolina. He graduated magna cum laude with a Bachelor of Science in chemical engineering from North Carolina State University in 1985. He was commissioned in the Navy after completing his training from Officer Candidate School in Newport, Rhode Island. He holds advanced academic degrees from the Naval Postgraduate School where he graduated with distinction with a Master of Science in Physics in 1992 and from Old Dominion University with a Master of Science in engineering management. He also graduated from the School of Advanced Studies, a branch of University of Phoenix, where he obtained his doctor of management in organizational leadership with a specialization in information systems and technology.

Caudle's published dissertation focused on military decision-making uncertainty while considering the use of force in cyberspace. He is also a professional engineer.

On December 4, 2020, the Department of Chemical and Biomolecular Engineering (CBE) at North Carolina State University awarded him the CBE Distinguished Alumni Award.

== Naval career ==
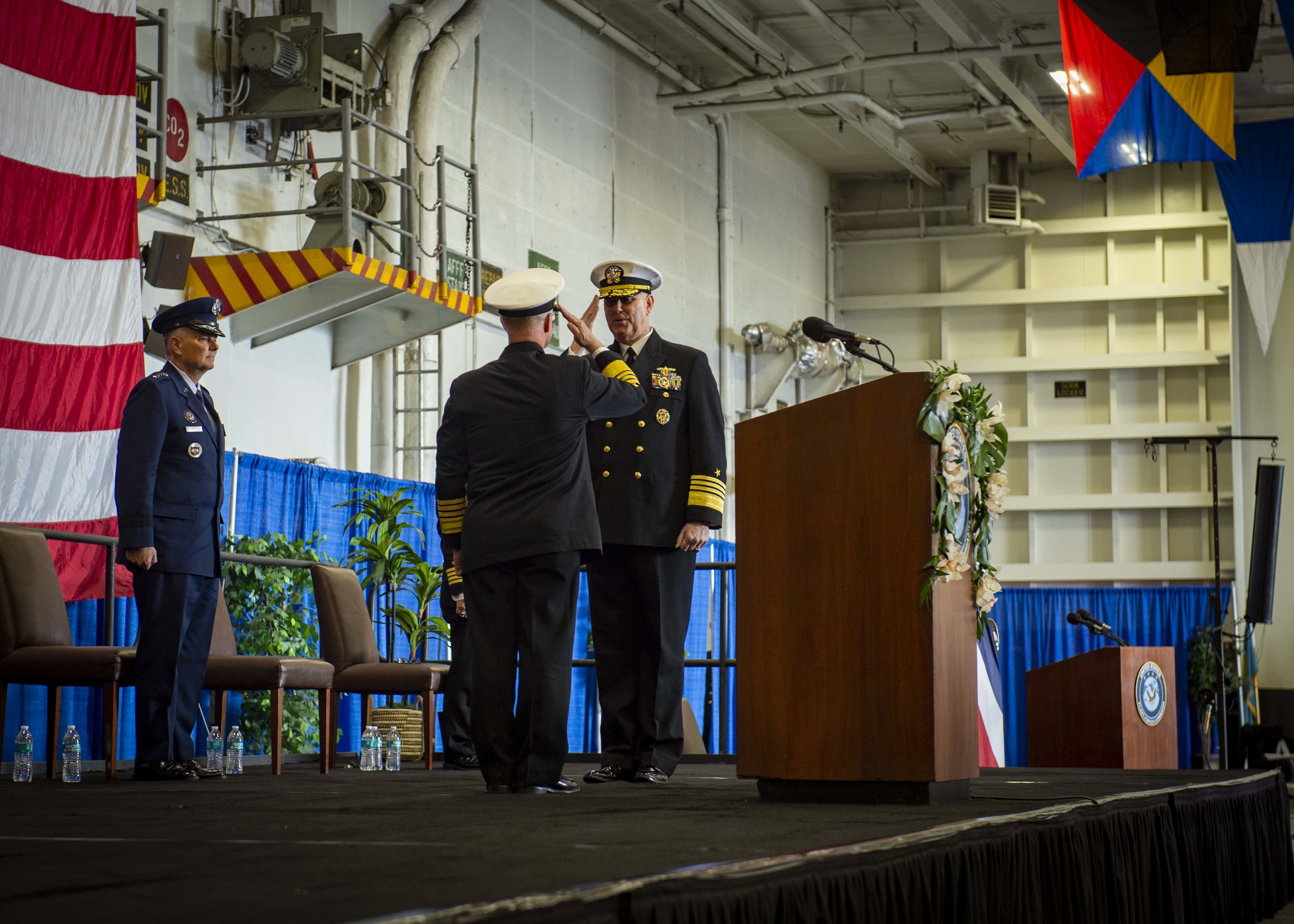
Adm. Caudle relieves Adm. Christopher W. Grady as commander of U.S. Fleet Forces Command on 7 December 2021

Caudle served at various posts during his sea tour assignments such as division officer, USS George Washington Carver (SSBN-656), engineer of USS Stonewall Jackson (SSBN-634) and USS Sand Lance (SSN-660) as well as serving as executive officer of USS Montpelier (SSN-765). His first command assignment was as commanding officer of USS Jefferson City (SSN-759). While appointed to the Submarine Squadron 11 as deputy commander, he served as commanding officer of USS Topeka (SSN-754) and USS Helena (SSN-725). He also commanded Submarine Squadron 3 as Commodore.

Caudle's tours ashore include assignments as assistant force nuclear power officer, commander, Submarine Force, U.S. Atlantic Fleet; Officer-in-Charge of Moored Training Ship (MTS 635); deputy commander of Submarine Squadron 11; assistant deputy director for information and cyberspace policy on the Joint Staff (J-5) in Washington, D.C.; and chief of staff, commander, Submarine Force, U.S. Pacific Fleet.

Caudle's other flag assignments include deputy chief for security cooperation, Office of the Defense Representative, Pakistan where he directly supported coalition forces for Operation Enduring Freedom; deputy commander, Joint Functional Component Command for Global Strike; deputy commander, U.S. 6th Fleet; director of operations U.S. Naval Forces Europe-Africa; commander, Submarine Group Eight, where he directed combat strikes using the first ever dual Carrier operations with allies in support of Operation Inherent Resolve. He also designed the plan and directed combat sorties for Operation Odyssey Lightning to counter violent extremists in Libya; and commander, Submarine Force, U.S. Pacific Fleet. After that, he was vice director for Strategy, Plans, and Policy on the Joint Staff (J-5) in Washington, D.C.

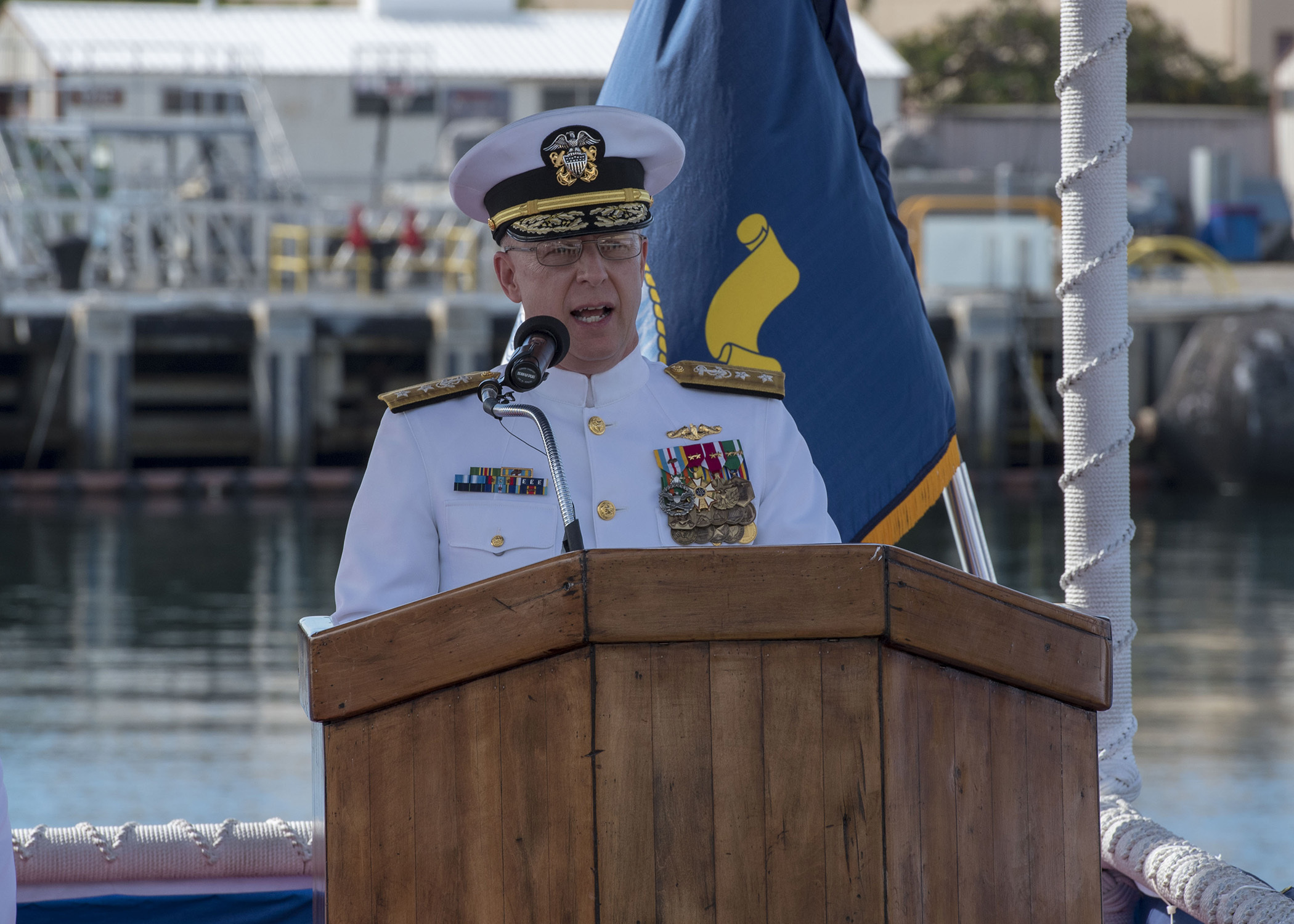
Caudle at the change of command ceremony for Submarine Force, Pacific Fleet, in February 2019.

In August 2019, Caudle became commander, Naval Submarine Forces; commander, Submarine Force Atlantic; and commander, Allied Submarine Command. In these posts he was responsible for providing strategic guidance for the submarine force, commanding all Atlantic-based submarine forces, and serving as the main advisor to NATO on submarine warfare. He was also in that role during the Navy's response to the COVID-19 pandemic. He relinquished command in September 2021.

In July 2021, he was nominated and confirmed for promotion to four-star admiral to succeed Christopher W. Grady as commander of the United States Fleet Forces Command. He became the head of Fleet Forces Command, which provides Navy forces to unified combatant commanders, in December 2021. In that position he was also simultaneously the commander of Naval Forces, U.S. Northern Command, and Naval Forces, U.S. Strategic Command.

=== Chief of naval operations ===
==== Confirmation process ====
In 2023 and 2025, Caudle was among the candidates under consideration to become the chief of naval operations. In the first instance, Lisa Franchetti was chosen by President Joe Biden. In June 2025, he was nominated to serve as the chief of naval operations by President Donald Trump, replacing James Kilby, who had been the acting chief since Franchetti was removed by Trump in February. Caudle relinquished command of U.S. Fleet Forces Command on 6 August 2025; his deputy, Vice Admiral John Gumbleton, succeeded him as acting commander. He became the chief of naval operations on 25 August 2025.

During Caudle's tenure as commander of Fleet Forces Command, his staff allegedly reached out to President Trump's nominee for Secretary of Defense, Pete Hegseth to offer his help in preparing Hegseth for the confirmation hearings in front of the Senate. Hegseth did not reply to the alleged offer. The alleged behavior was classified as a breach of military ethics by anonymous officials familiar with the matter.

==== Inspector general investigation ====
In 2025, after his selection as the nominee for Chief of Naval Operations was being staffed, an investigation by the Naval Inspector General commenced into the conduct of Admiral Caudle. The investigation was focusing on comments Caudle had allegedly made a year prior to sailors in regard to the Pentagon's Sexual Assault Prevention and Response program. Multiple sailors recalled an informal conversation in which Caudle pledged for the program to prioritize prevention in order to improve the program's efficacy and protect sailors from sexual assault. At least one sailor allegedly saw his comments as blaming victims for their sexual assaults.

In response to the investigation and based on recommendations from Navy officials, Caudle hired Timothy Parlatore as counsel. Parlatore, a trial attorney, had previously negiotated a settlement on behalf of Pete Hegseth after accusations of rape against him in 2017. He had also represented President Trump in response to the January 6 attack and the classified documents case.

The inspector general eventually found the allegations against Caudle to be unsubstantiated. In August 2026, Representative Jason Crow (D-CO) formally requested comment by Secretary Hegseth about Parlatore's influence in senior personnel decisions in the Department.

==== Tenure ====
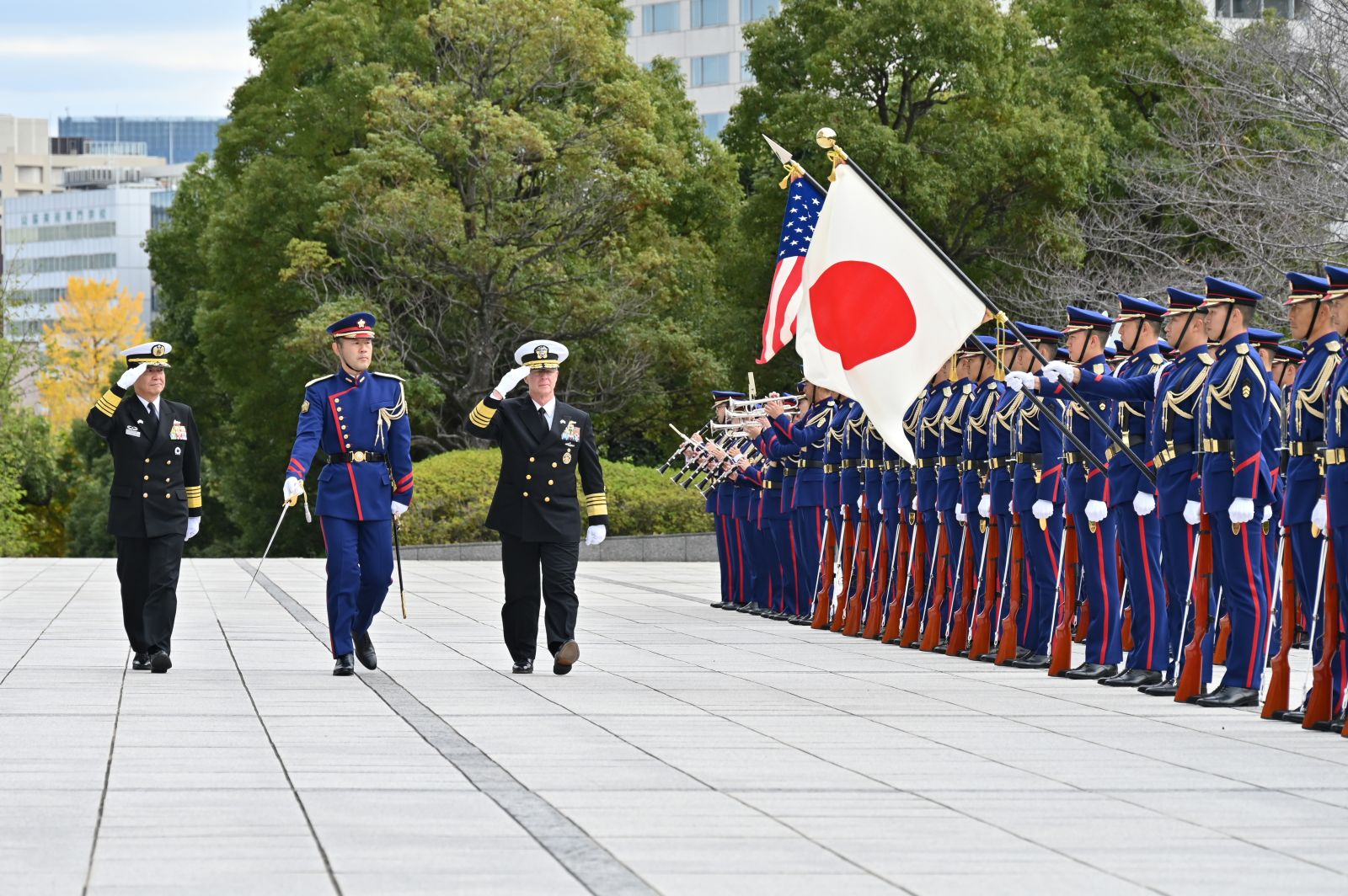
Caudle receives a Japanese honor guard during his visit to the Japan Maritime Self-Defense Force, in November 2025.

In November 2025 Caudle went on a 10-day tour of the Asia-Pacific, visiting U.S. bases in the region and allied shipyards in South Korea and Japan. The purpose of the tour was to examine the living conditions for sailors and to explore cooperation with allied countries to assist the U.S. shipbuilding industry.

In February 2026 Caudle released the U.S. Navy Fighting Instructions, a framework of his strategic vision for the development of the Navy.

In the Secretary of Defense Orders Book of 14 August 2026, Caudle informed Hegseth that the Navy is not capable of sustaining its deployments in the war against Iran. He added that the prolonged deployment for the Iran war has reduced the readiness of the Navy's ships, with only a quarter of its destroyer force ready to deploy, and its capability to respond to potential conflicts elsewhere. That month, he estimated that the Navy will need an additional $6–8 billion over its annual budget to remain solvent amid its efforts related to the Iran war and blockade. During a Q&A session with sailors on 31 August, Caudle said that they should expect longer deployments until the fleet and force is expanded.

== Awards and decorations ==
Personal decorations
Defense Distinguished Service Medal
Navy Distinguished Service Medal
Defense Superior Service Medal with three bronze oak leaf clusters
Legion of Merit with three gold award stars
Meritorious Service Medal with two award stars
Navy Commendation Medal with four award stars
Navy Achievement Medal with three award stars
Unit Awards
Joint Meritorious Unit Award with two oak leaf clusters
Navy Unit Commendation
Navy Meritorious Unit Commendation with two bronze service stars
Navy "E" Ribbon with three Battle E devices
Campaign and service medals
Navy Expeditionary Medal with service star
National Defense Service Medal with service star
Global War on Terrorism Expeditionary Medal
Global War on Terrorism Service Medal
Korea Defense Service Medal
Armed Forces Service Medal
Military Outstanding Volunteer Service Medal
Navy Sea Service Deployment Ribbon with seven service stars
Navy Arctic Service Ribbon
Navy and Marine Corps Overseas Service Ribbon with two service stars
Special Operations Service Ribbon with service star
Foreign and international awards
Brazilian Order of Naval Merit, Commander
Peruvian Order of Naval Merit, Grand Cross
NATO Medal for the former Yugoslavia with service star
Marksmanship awards
Navy Rifle Marksmanship Ribbon
Navy Expert Pistol Shot Medal

Other accoutrements
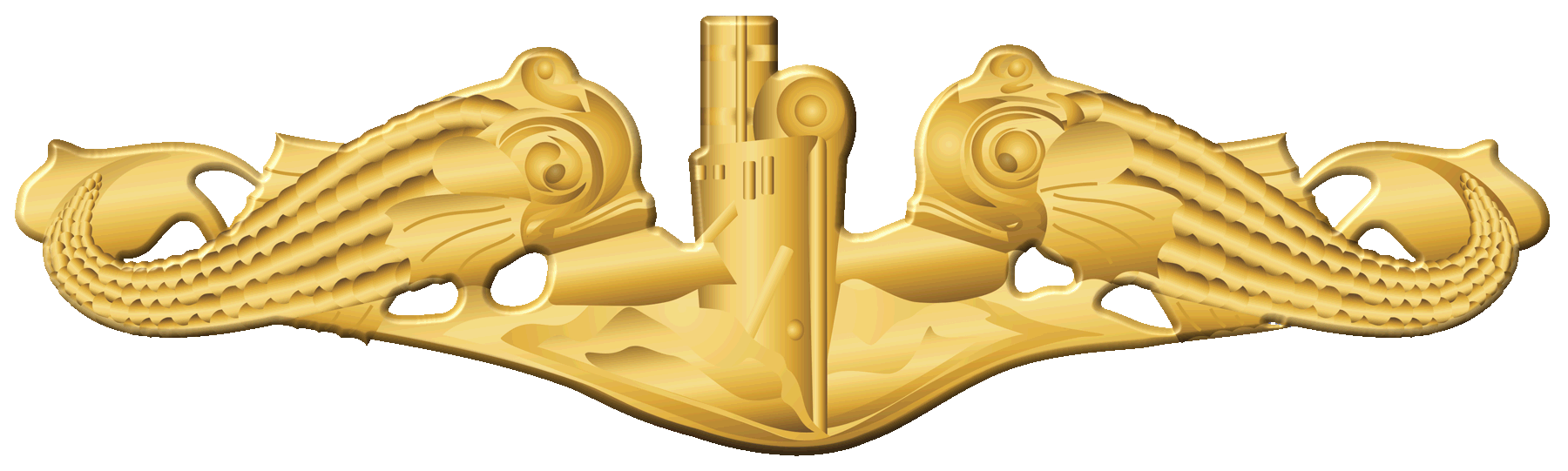
Submarine Warfare insignia (Officer)
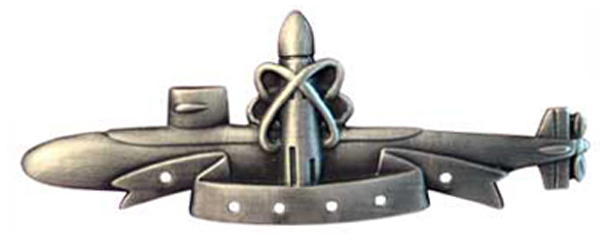
Silver SSBN Deterrent Patrol insignia (7 awards)
Command at Sea insignia
Office of the Joint Chiefs of Staff Identification Badge

== Dates of promotion ==
Rank	Branch	Date
Ensign	Navy	1985
Lieutenant junior grade	Navy	28 April 1988
Lieutenant	Navy	
Lieutenant commander	Navy	31 October 1995
Commander	Navy	27 June 2000
Captain	Navy	22 May 2006
Rear admiral (lower half)	Navy	23 May 2013
Rear admiral	Navy	1 May 2017
Vice admiral	Navy	26 September 2019
Admiral	Navy	29 July 2021

== Personal life ==
Caudle is married to Donna Caudle, with whom he has two daughters, two stepdaughters, three grandsons, and two granddaughters. Two of his sons-in-law are active duty military, one in the Navy and one in the Marine Corps. He lives in Washington, DC.

Military offices
Preceded by Fritz Roegge	Commander of Submarine Force, United States Pacific Fleet; 2017–2019	Succeeded by Blake Converse
Preceded by Charles A. Richard	Commander of Submarine Forces, Submarine Force Atlantic, and Allied Submarine Command; 2019–2021	Succeeded by William J. Houston
Preceded by Christopher W. Grady	Commander of United States Fleet Forces Command; 2021–2025	Succeeded by John Gumbleton; Acting
Preceded by James W. Kilby; Acting	Chief of Naval Operations; 2025–present	Incumbent
Order of precedence
Preceded by Eric M. Smith as Commandant of the Marine Corps	Order of precedence of the United States as Chief of Naval Operations	Succeeded by Kenneth S. Wilsbach as Chief of Staff of the Air Force
