= Falmouth High School (Massachusetts) =

Coordinates: 41°35′24.8″N 70°36′27.8″W

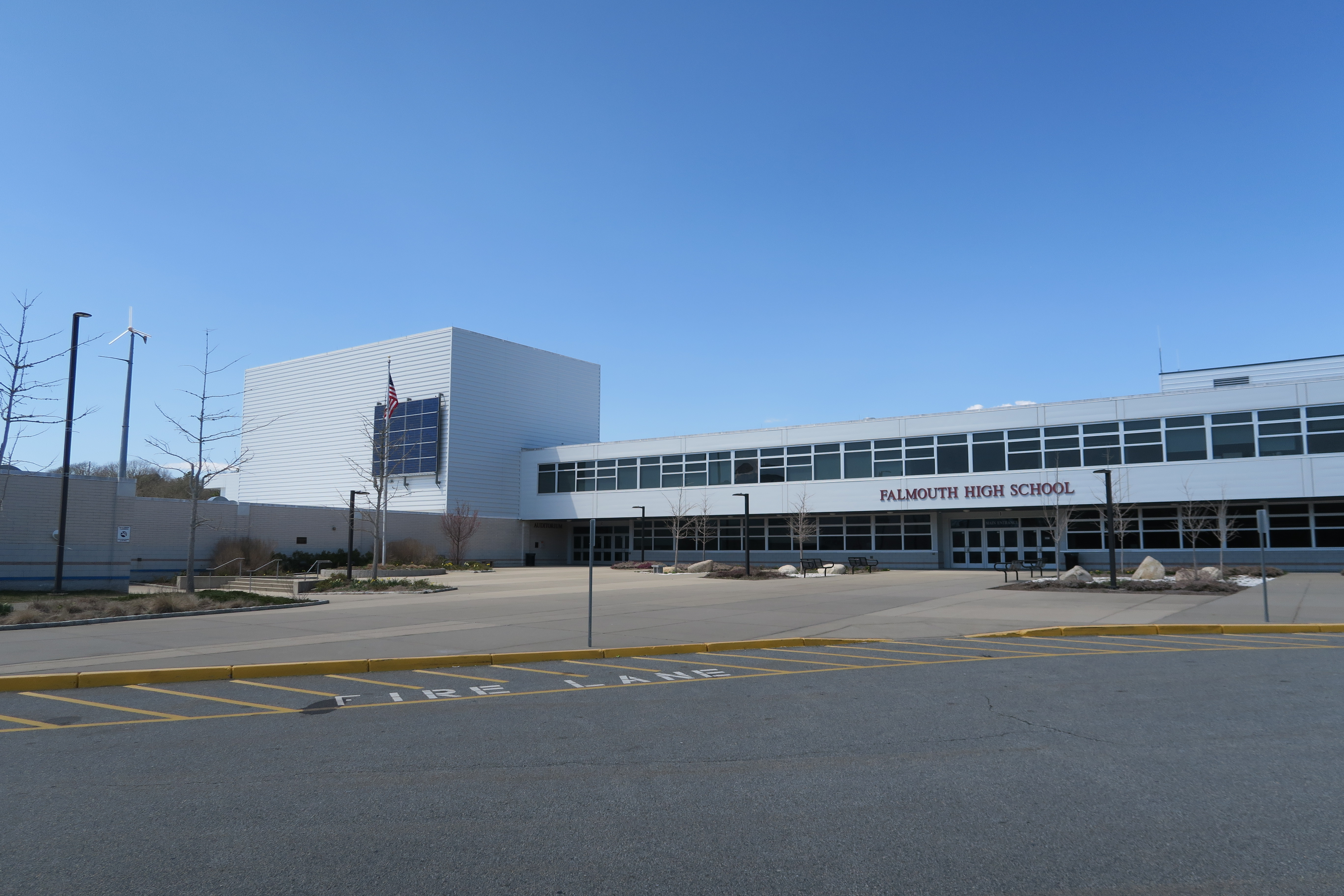
- 874 Gifford Street Ext. Falmouth, MA 02540; United States

Information
- Type: Public high school Open enrollment
- Established: 1973
- School district: Falmouth
- Principal: Alan Harris
- Teaching staff: 66.21 (FTE)
- Grades: 9–12
- Enrollment: 714 (2024–2025)
- Student to teacher ratio: 10.78
- Colors: Maroon & White
- Athletics: MIAA – Division 3
- Athletics conference: Cape and Islands League
- Nickname: Clippers
- Website: School website

Falmouth High School (FHS) is a public high school located in the town of Falmouth, Massachusetts, United States. The school serves roughly 870 students in grades 9–12. Over the past few years, Falmouth High School has undergone major renovations. Up until 1973, the school was named Lawrence High School and located at what is now Lawrence Junior High School. Falmouth High School is located at 874 Gifford Street Ext. The school's mascot is the Clipper and the school colors are maroon and white.

== History ==
The presence of a high school in the town of Falmouth dates back to the late 1800s and was originally known as Lawrence High School. However, the current Falmouth High School was only established in 1973. The name change was applied in order to more closely identify the high school with the town of Falmouth and disassociate from Lawrence High School in Lawrence, Massachusetts.

Students from the neighboring town of Mashpee attended Falmouth High School for many years, until the town of Mashpee established their own separate high school in 1996.

In recent years, Falmouth has undergone several periods of major renovation, which ran into the dozens of millions of dollars. These renovations came under intense scrutiny at several points and were plagued by constant setbacks, which included poor construction and architecture, massively exceeding the proposed budget, exceeding the proposed completion date, and several breach-of-contract suits against the school committee, architects, contractors and firms involved. Initially, the project was supposed to cost $67 million and take two years to complete, but the project ended up costing $87 million, $20 million over budget, and took almost six years to complete.

== Athletics ==
These are some recent accomplishments of Falmouth athletic teams.

- Boys' Hockey – State Champions (1979, 1981, 1982, 1996)
- Boys' Hockey – State Finalists (1983)
- Boys' Hockey – Super 8 Finalists (1994)
- Boys' Hockey – EMass Regional Finalists (1980)
- Girls' Hockey – State Champions (2015)
- Football – State Champions (1947, 2016)
- Football – State Finalists (1994)
- Football – State Playoff Qualifier (1994, 2015, 2016)
- Boys' Basketball – State Finalists (2009)
- Boys' Basketball – Eastern Massachusetts Champions (2009)
- Boys’ Lacrosse - State Finalists (2023, 2025)
- Boys' Tennis – State Champions (2007)
- Girls Spring Track - State Champions (1975, 1976, 1977, 1978, 1981, 1982, 1991, 1992, 1993, 1995-
- Girls Winter Track - State Champions (1978, 1979, 1994, 1995)
- Girls Spring Track - State Divisional Champions (1975, 1976, 1977, 1978, 1980, 1981, 1982, 1984, 1991, 1993, 1994,1995, 1996)
- Girls Winter Track State Divisional Champions (1991, 1993, 1994, 1995)
- Girls Cross Country - State Champions (1971, 1972, 1939, 1974, 1975, 1977)
- Girls Cross Country - Divisional Champions (1975, 1976, 1977, 1978)

== Alumni ==
- Phil Edmund, 1934, Latin jazz musician
- John Gumbleton, 1985, naval officer
- Matt Malone, S.J., 1990, publisher
- Alicia M. Soderberg, 1996, astrophysicist
- Jamaal Branch, 1999, former NFL player
- Joseph Rago, 2001, former Wall Street Journal journalist
- Steve Cishek, c. 2004, former MLB pitcher
- Johanna Forman, 1977, architect, Harvard grad, 1977 USNational Senior Women's 880 Champion indoor (3 US International teams)
- Christine Tuttle, 1985, This Old House TV designer and internationally published interior designer
