= Jamaal Branch =

American football player (born 1981)

No. 35
- Position: Running back

Personal information
- Born: January 30, 1981 (age 45); Hartford, Connecticut, U.S.
- Listed height: 6 ft 0 in (1.83 m)
- Listed weight: 225 lb (102 kg)

Career information
- High school: Falmouth (MA)
- College: Colgate
- NFL draft: 2006: undrafted

Career history
- Rhein Fire (2006); Cologne Centurions (2006); New Orleans Saints (2006–2007)

Awards and highlights
- Walter Payton Award (2003)

Career NFL statistics
- Rushing attempts: 10
- Rushing yards: 29
- Receptions: 5
- Receiving yards: 14
- Receiving touchdowns: 1
- Stats at Pro Football Reference

Jamaal Branch (born January 30, 1981) is an American former professional football player who was a running back for two seasons with the New Orleans Saints of the National Football League (NFL). He played college football for the Colgate Raiders. He was signed by the Saints as an undrafted free agent in 2006.

== Early life and education ==
Jamaal Branch was born in Hartford, Connecticut, but soon after his family moved to Mashpee, Massachusetts, where he still resides. Branch attended Falmouth High School and graduated in 1999. While at Falmouth, Branch was a 4-time letter-winner for Football & Track teams, and was teammates at Falmouth with another former NFL player from Mashpee, Willie Ford. Branch was also a star football player while attending New Hampton Preparatory School where he was a postgraduate student.

== College career ==
Branch played college football at Colgate University from 2000–2001, 2003-2004. After sitting out all of 2002 for personal reasons, Branch led all of Division I football with 168.8 rushing yards and 12.5 points per game in 2003, setting NCAA records for yards (2,026), touchdowns (25), rushes (338), 100-yard games (11), and consecutive 100-yard games (11). He received the 2003 Walter Payton Award, given annually by The Sports Network.com to the best player in Division I-AA football. It is widely considered to be the equivalent of the Heisman Trophy for Division I-A. He graduated in 2005 and is the first in his family to attend and graduate from college.

== Professional career ==
Before Branch's rookie season, he played in NFL Europe for the Rhein Fire and Cologne Centurions to help develop his skills and adjust to playing in the NFL. On December 29, 2006, it was reported that the New Orleans Saints signed Branch to their roster. Two days later, in the Saints' New Year's Eve game against the Carolina Panthers, Branch scored his first touchdown. It was a 7-yard outside rush to the end zone. Branch broke his leg on the opening kickoff of the 2007 season's week 16 game against Philadelphia. Branch did not play again that season. He was released by the Saints on May 2, 2008.

== Personal life ==
Branch currently works with the Pop Warner Youth Football players in his hometown of Mashpee, and also works with a company called D-1 Athletes, alongside former Carolina Panthers and Tennessee Titans wide receiver, Isaac Byrd.

A native of Mashpee, Massachusetts, Branch is of mixed African-American and Native American Indian (Wampanoag) descent. His mother is from the Mashpee Wampanoag Tribe.
