= Matt Malone =

American Catholic Jesuit priest and writer

Matthew F. Malone (born 1972) is an American author, journalist, and former Jesuit priest. He served as the editor-in-chief of America magazine and as president of its parent publisher, America Media, from 2012 to 2022.

== Early life ==
Malone was born on Cape Cod, Massachusetts and attended Mashpee Middle School and Falmouth High School. He is the fifth of sixth children born to an Irish-Catholic family. He was baptized at the parish of Our Lady of Victory in Centerville, Massachusetts and was confirmed at the Parish of Christ the King in Mashpee. He has written about the death of his brother in a drunk driving crash in 1984 and his father’s subsequent act of forgiveness.

== Education ==
Malone was the Massachusetts state champion and second-place national winner in the 1990 American Legion High School Oratorical Competition. For this achievement he was invited to address the Massachusetts General Court. Malone graduated from the University of Massachusetts Amherst where he majored in history.

== Career ==
Malone worked for the Massachusetts Democratic Party, serving as a field coordinator for the 1994 senatorial and gubernatorial nominees. From 1995 to 1997, he was an assistant to U.S. Representative Martin T. Meehan (D-MA). In 1997, Malone was named the founding deputy director of MassINC, a nonpartisan political think tank. He subsequently served as co-publisher of CommonWealth, MassINC’s quarterly review of politics, ideas and civic life. He was twice elected to the Planning Board in his hometown of Mashpee, Massachusetts and served as chairman during his second term.

=== The Jesuits ===
Malone entered the Jesuits in 2002. After completing his novitiate in Syracuse, New York, he earned an M.A. in philosophy at Fordham University, studying under the renowned Jesuit philosopher and teacher, W. Norris Clarke, S.J. From 2007-2009, Malone was an associate editor at America, where he covered U.S. politics and foreign affairs and oversaw the first re-design of the magazine in more than a decade. He was ordained to the priesthood in 2012 by Cardinal Edward Egan, former archbishop of New York.

Malone led America Media, formerly known as America Press, from 2012 to 2022. During his tenure, he developed and implemented a strategic plan for transforming the weekly print magazine into a multi-platform media company. Malone leveraged the equity in the organization’s headquarters building in Manhattan to invest in new technology, hire staff members and redesign the magazine and website. As of 2018, America Media had grown to include a staff of 45 employees with an annual budget of $10.5 million and an endowment of nearly $40 million. As of 2021, America Media reported 1.1 million unique digital visitors per month and a growing number of print and digital subscribers—the highest numbers in the organization’s history. During Malone’s tenure, in conjunction with a number of Jesuit journals throughout the world, America published the first interview with Pope Francis. During his tenure, America also published: the first issue of a Jesuit magazine written and edited entirely by women; the most comprehensive survey of American Catholic women ever conducted; and the first journalistic interview with then-Vice President Joe Biden following the death of his son, Beau. Malone's profiles and interviews include former U.S. House Speaker John Boehner, Louisiana Governor John Bel Edwards, Broadway icon Vanessa Williams, and human rights activist Kerry Kennedy. Since 2012, America Media has won a record-number of awards and has twice been named magazine of the year by the Catholic Media Association, which honored the organization for “setting an incredibly high bar for intellectualism and spirituality.” Malone announced in 2021 that he would step down as president and editor in chief in the autumn of 2022. He resigned both positions on November 30, 2022.

Malone has provided analysis and commentary on ecclesial and political events for most major news networks. He is a consultant for NBC News. He has provided commentary for NBC Nightly News, Hardball with Chris Matthews, Morning Joe, the BBC, NPR, the PBS NewsHour and the Charlie Rose Show. His work and ideas have been featured in The New York Times, The Washington Post and The Wall Street Journal, among others. He is the author of “Catholiques Sans Etiquette” (Catholics Without Labels), a book concerning the church and politics, which was published by Salvator Press in Paris.

Malone is a chaplain to the New York Press Club. In 2018 he was the presiding chaplain at the memorial service to mark the 50th anniversary of the death of Robert F. Kennedy at Arlington National Cemetery. Malone has twice co-published opinion columns with former U.S. Senator John C. Danforth. He has also served on the boards of trustees of Boston College, the Catholic Medical Mission Board (CMMB), The Appeal of Conscience Foundation, and the Fulton J. Sheen Center for Thought and Culture.

In late 2024, Malone announced that he would exit the Society of Jesus and petition to be dispensed from the obligations of Catholic holy orders. He married fellow Catholic journalist Ashley McKinless in September 2026.

== Awards and distinctions ==
- Malone's column in America was named best regular column by the Catholic Press Association in 2018
- Malone has twice won the best essay award from the CPA
- In 2022, Malone won a first place award for travel writing from the New York Press Club
- Malone is a recipient of The Cross "Pro Piis Meritis" pro Merito Melitensi from the Sovereign Military Order of Malta for his services to their mission to the United Nations
- Malone is a recipient of The John Carroll Medal from The John Carroll Society
