= Chief of Naval Operations =

Highest-ranking officer of the United States Navy

- Seal of the chief of naval operations

- Flag of the chief of naval operations

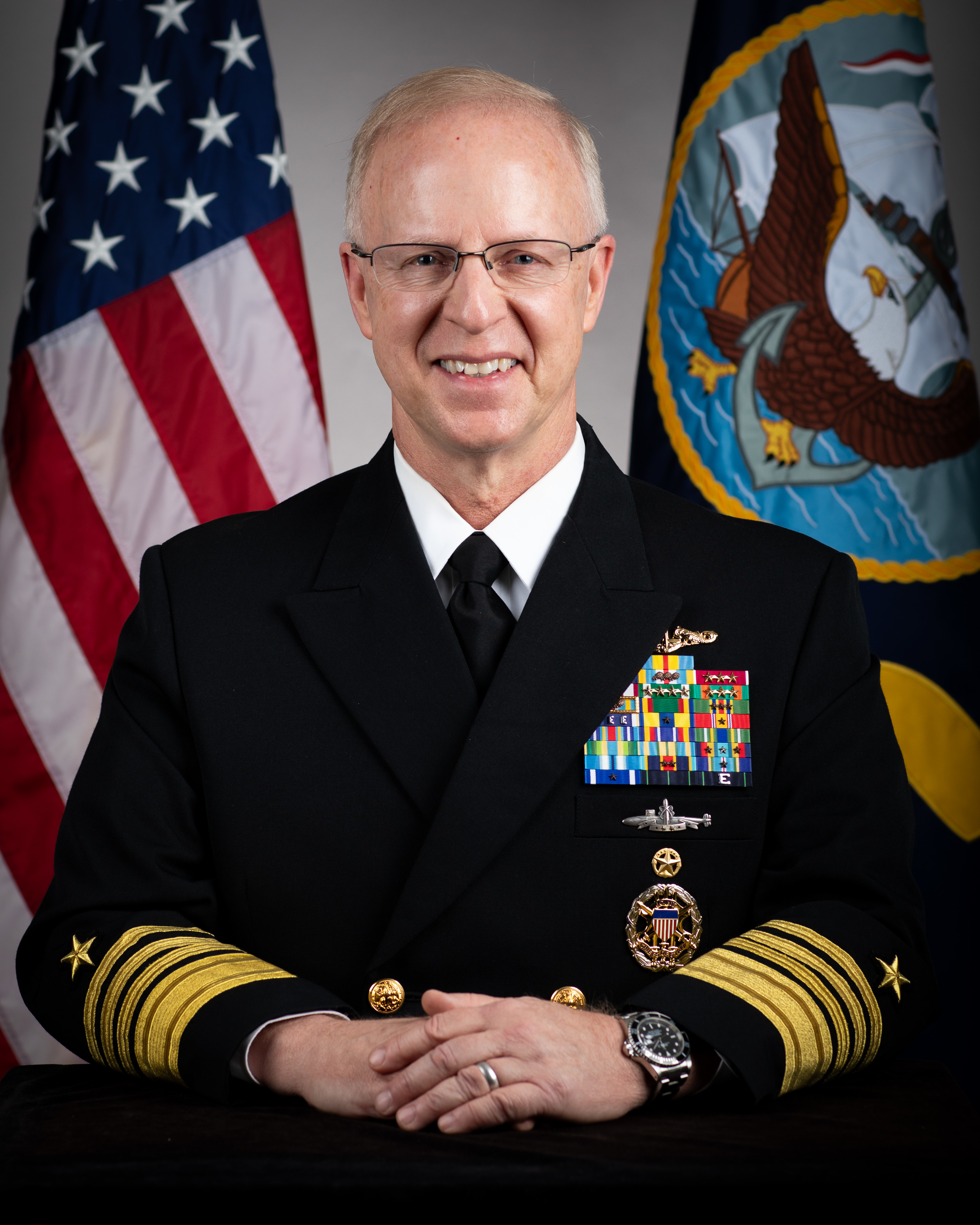
- Incumbent; Admiral Daryl Caudle since 25 August 2025
- United States Navy; Office of the Chief of Naval Operations
- Abbreviation: CNO
- Member of: Joint Chiefs of Staff
- Reports to: Secretary of the Navy
- Residence: Tingey House
- Appointer: The president; with Senate advice and consent
- Term length: 4 years; Renewable one time, only during war or national emergency
- Constituting instrument: 10 U.S.C. § 8033
- Precursor: Aide for Naval Operations
- Formation: 11 May 1915
- First holder: ADM William S. Benson
- Deputy: Vice Chief of Naval Operations
- Website: www.navy.mil

The chief of naval operations (CNO) is the highest-ranking officer of the United States Navy. The position is a statutory office (10 U.S.C. § 8033) held by an admiral who is a military adviser and deputy to the secretary of the Navy. The CNO is also a member of the Joint Chiefs of Staff (10 U.S.C. § 151) and in this capacity, a military adviser to the National Security Council, the Homeland Security Council, the secretary of defense, and the president.

Despite the title, the CNO does not have operational command authority over naval forces. The CNO is an administrative position based in the Pentagon, and exercises supervision of Navy organizations as the designee of the secretary of the Navy. Operational command of naval forces falls within the purview of the combatant commanders who report to the secretary of defense.

Since 25 August 2025, the 34th chief of naval operations is Admiral Daryl Caudle.

== Appointment, rank, and responsibilities ==
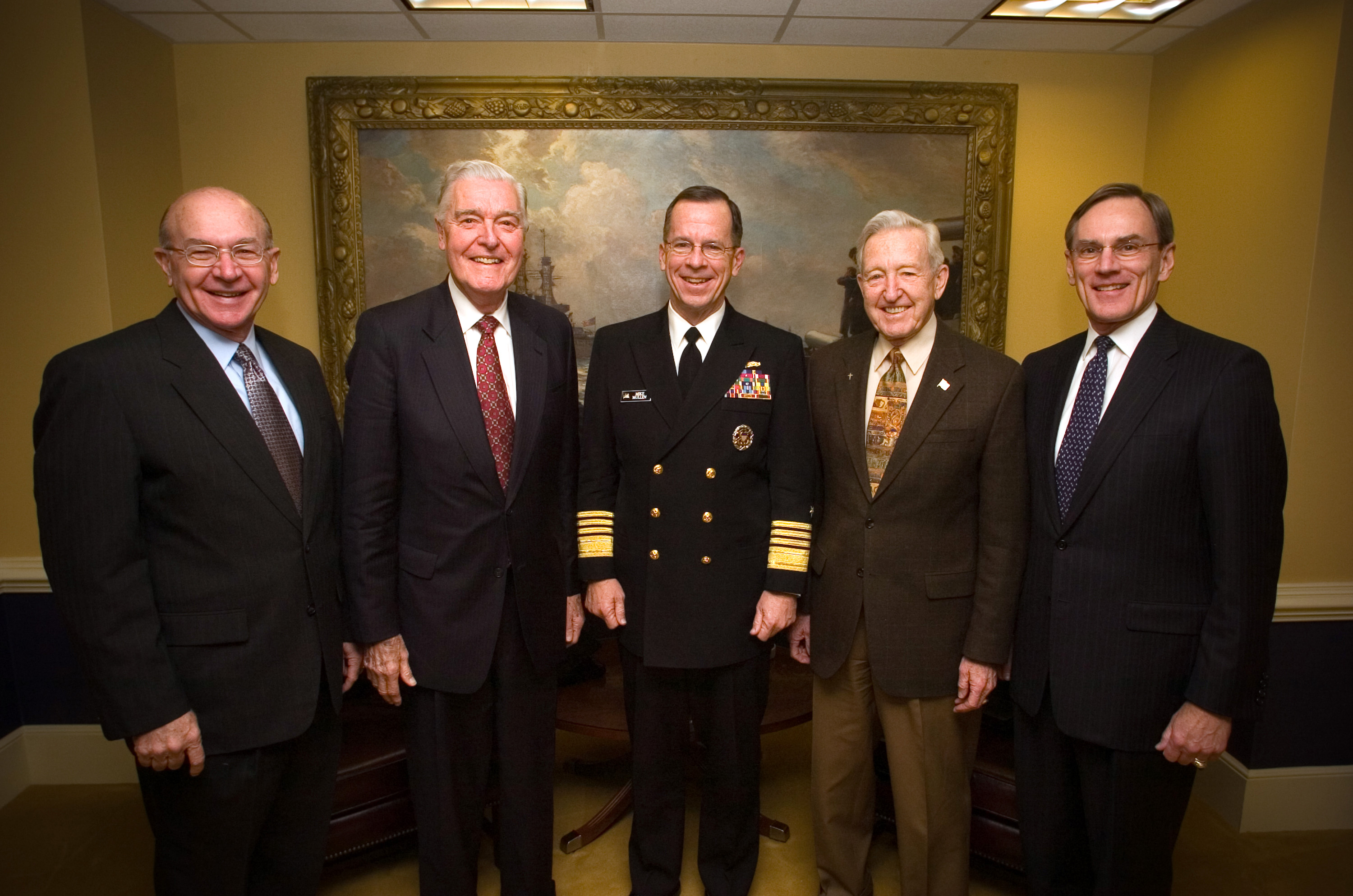
Michael Mullen, CNO in December 2006, with some of his predecessors: Vern Clark, James D. Watkins, Thomas B. Hayward, and Jay L. Johnson

The chief of naval operations (CNO) is typically the highest-ranking officer on active duty in the U.S. Navy unless the chairman and/or the vice chairman of the Joint Chiefs of Staff are naval officers. The CNO is nominated for appointment by the president, for a four-year term of office, and must be confirmed by the Senate. A requirement for being Chief of Naval Operations is having significant experience in joint duty assignments, which includes at least one full tour of duty in a joint duty assignment as a flag officer. However, the president may waive those requirements if he determines that appointing the officer is necessary for the national interest. The chief can be reappointed to serve one additional term, but only during times of war or national emergency declared by Congress. By statute, the CNO is appointed as a four-star admiral.

As per 10 U.S.C. § 8035, whenever there is a vacancy for the chief of naval operations or during the absence or disability of the chief of naval operations, and unless the president directs otherwise, the vice chief of naval operations performs the duties of the chief of naval operations until a successor is appointed or the absence or disability ceases.

=== Department of the Navy ===
The CNO also performs all other functions prescribed under 10 U.S.C. § 8033, such as presiding over the Office of the Chief of Naval Operations (OPNAV), exercising supervision of Navy organizations, and other duties assigned by the secretary or higher lawful authority, or the CNO delegates those duties and responsibilities to other officers in OPNAV or in organizations below.

Acting for the secretary of the Navy, the CNO also designates naval personnel and naval forces available to the commanders of unified combatant commands, subject to the approval of the secretary of defense.

=== Joint Chiefs of Staff ===
The CNO is a member of the Joint Chiefs of Staff as prescribed by 10 U.S.C. § 151 and 10 U.S.C. § 8033. Like the other members of the Joint Chiefs of Staff, the CNO is an administrative position, with no operational command authority over the United States Navy forces.

Members of the Joint Chiefs of Staff, individually or collectively, in their capacity as military advisers, shall provide advice to the president, the National Security Council (NSC), or the secretary of defense (SECDEF) on a particular matter when the president, the NSC, or SECDEF requests such advice. Members of the Joint Chiefs of Staff (other than the chairman of the Joint Chiefs of Staff) may submit to the chairman advice or an opinion in disagreement with, or advice or an opinion in addition to, the advice presented by the chairman to the president, NSC, or SECDEF.

When performing their JCS duties, the CNO is responsible directly to the SECDEF, but keeps SECNAV fully informed of significant military operations affecting the duties and responsibilities of the SECNAV, unless SECDEF orders otherwise.

== History ==
=== Early attempts and the Aide for Naval Operations (1900–1915) ===
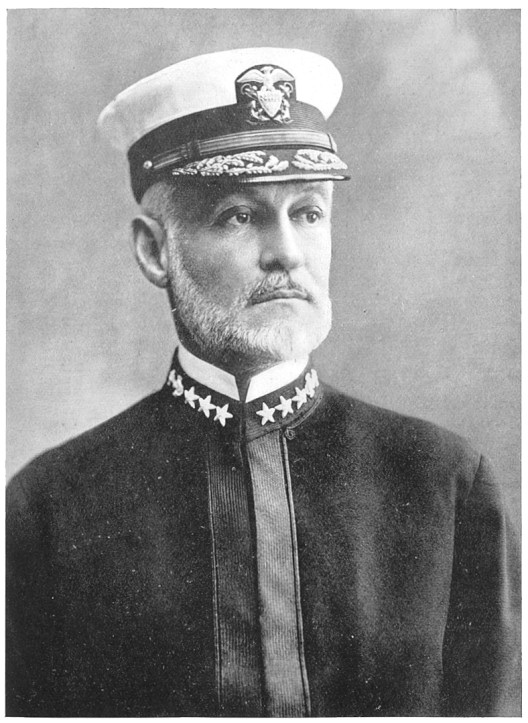
William Sims

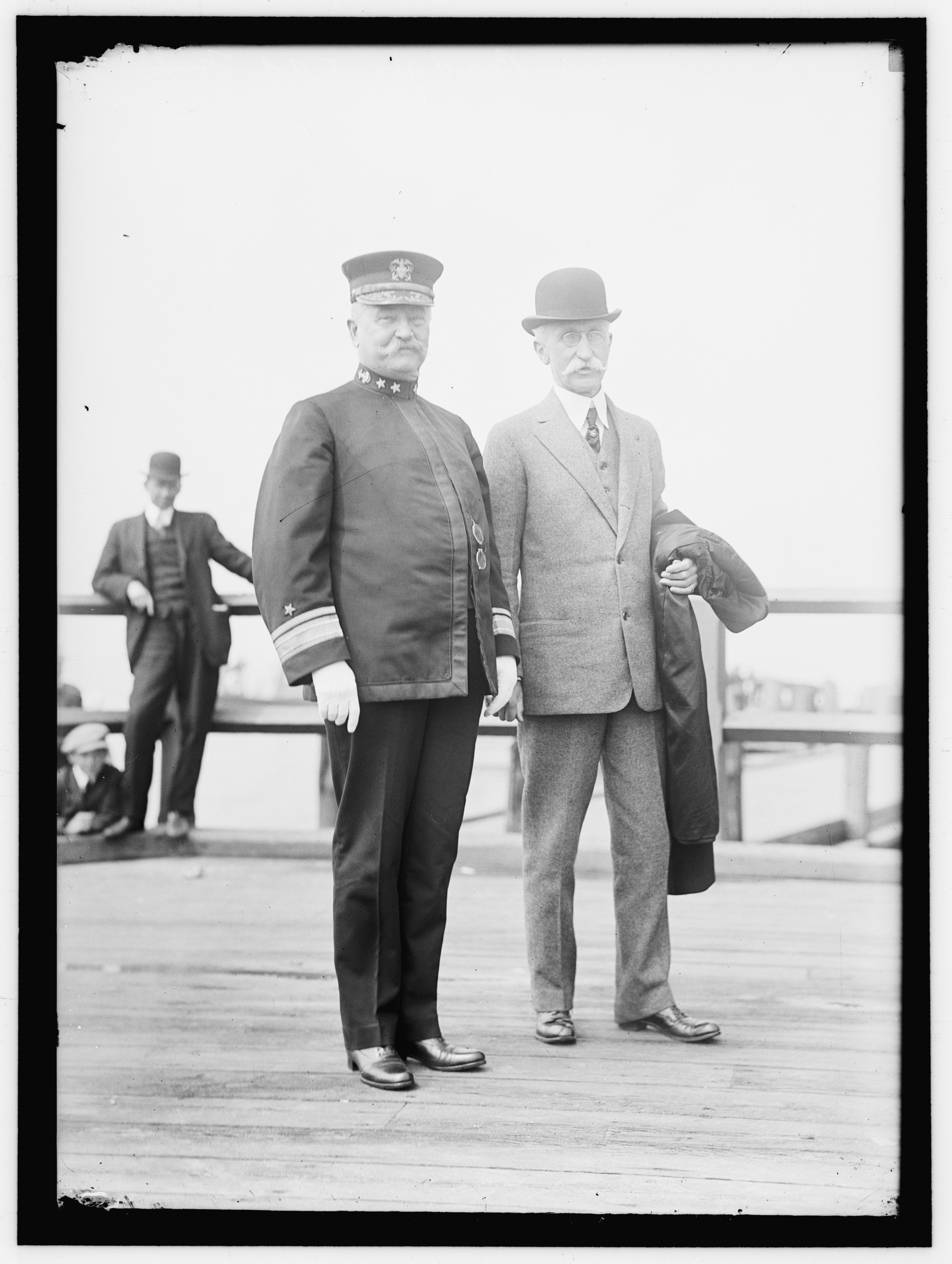
Rear Admiral Charles Johnston Badger with Rear Admiral Bradley A. Fiske, c. 1914

In 1900, administrative and operational authority over the Navy was concentrated in the secretary of the Navy and bureau chiefs, with the General Board holding only advisory powers. Critics of the lack of military command authority included Charles J. Bonaparte, Navy secretary from 1905 to 1906, then-Captain Reginald R. Belknap and future admiral William Sims.

Rear Admiral George A. Converse, commander of the Bureau of Navigation (BuNav) from 1905 to 1906, reported:

[W]ith each year that passes the need is painfully apparent for a military administrative authority under the secretary, whose purpose would be to initiate and direct the steps necessary to carry out the Department's policy, and to coordinate the work of the bureaus and direct their energies toward the effective preparation of the fleet for war.

However, reorganization attempts were opposed by Congress due to fears of a Prussian-style general staff and inadvertently increasing the powers of the Navy secretary, which risked infringing on legislative authority. Senator Eugene Hale, chairman of the Senate Committee on Naval Affairs, disliked reformers like Sims and persistently blocked attempts to bring such ideas to debate.

To circumvent the opposition, George von Lengerke Meyer, Secretary of the Navy under William Howard Taft implemented a system of "aides" on 18 November 1909. These aides lacked command authority and instead served as principal advisors to the Navy secretary. The aide for operations was deemed by Meyer to be the most important one, responsible for devoting "his entire attention and study to the operations of the fleet," and drafting orders for the movement of ships on the advice of the General Board and approval of the secretary in times of war or emergency.

The successes of Meyer's first operations aide, Rear Admiral Richard Wainwright, factored into Meyer's decision to make his third operations aide, Rear Admiral Bradley A. Fiske his de facto principal advisor on 10 February 1913. Fiske retained his post under Meyer's successor, Josephus Daniels, becoming the most prominent advocate for what would become the office of CNO.

=== Creating the position of Chief of Naval Operations (1915) ===
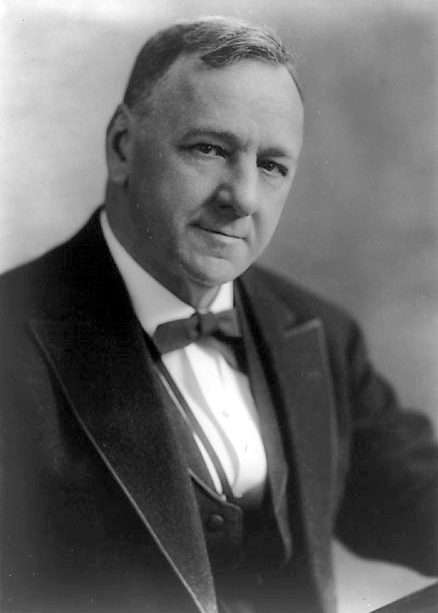
Secretary of the Navy Josephus Daniels

In 1914, Fiske, frustrated at Daniels' ambivalence towards his opinion that the Navy was unprepared for the possibility of entry into World War I, bypassed the secretary to collaborate with Representative Richmond P. Hobson, a retired Navy admiral, to draft legislation providing for the office of "a chief of naval operations". The preliminary proposal (passed off as Hobson's own to mask Fiske's involvement), in spite of Daniels' opposition, passed Hobson's subcommittee unanimously on 4 January 1915, and passed the full House Committee on Naval Affairs on 6 January.

Fiske's younger supporters expected him to be named the first chief of naval operations, and his versions of the bill provided for the minimum rank of the officeholder to be a two-star rear admiral.

There shall be a Chief of Naval Operations, who shall be an officer on the active list of the Navy not below the grade of Rear Admiral, appointed for a term of four years by the President, by and with the advice of the Senate, who, under the Secretary of the Navy, shall be responsible for the readiness of the Navy for war and be charged with its general direction.

— Fiske's version of the bill

In contrast, Daniels' version, included in the final bill, emphasized the office's subordination to the Navy secretary, allowed for the selection of the CNO from officers of the rank of captain, and denied it authority over the Navy's general direction:

There shall be a Chief of Naval Operations, who shall be an officer on the active list of the Navy appointed by the President, by and with the advice and consent of the Senate, from the officers of the line of the Navy not below the grade of Captain for a period of four years, who shall, under the direction of the Secretary, be charged with the operations of the fleet, and with the preparation and readiness of plans for its use in war.

— Daniels' version of the bill

Fiske's "end-running" of Daniels eliminated any possibility of him being named the first CNO. Nevertheless, satisfied with the change he had helped enact, Fiske made a final contribution: elevating the statutory rank of the CNO to admiral with commensurate pay. The Senate passed the appropriations bill creating the CNO position and its accompanying office on 3 March 1915, simultaneously abolishing the aides system promulgated under Meyer.

=== Benson, the first CNO (1915–1919) ===
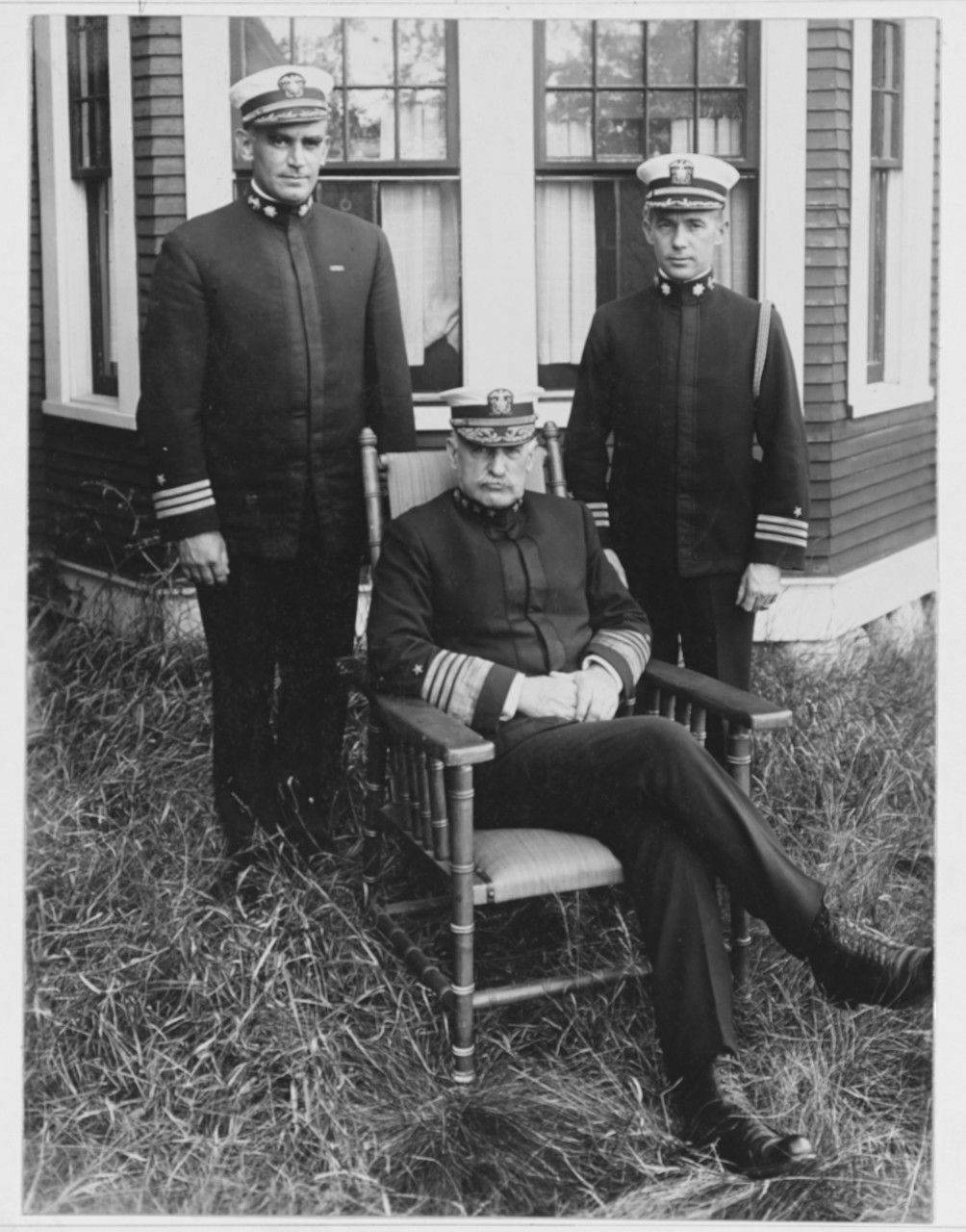
Admiral William S. Benson, chief of naval operations (seated), relaxes at Pruyn's Home, Lower Saranac Lake, New York, c. Sept. 1918. With him are Commander Charles Belknap Jr. (left), and his aide, Commander Worral R. Carter (right).

Captain William S. Benson was promoted to the temporary rank of rear admiral and became the first CNO on 11 May 1915. He further assumed the rank of admiral after the passage of the 1916 Naval Appropriations Bill with Fiske's amendments, second only to Admiral of the Navy George Dewey and explicitly senior to the commanders-in-chief of the Atlantic, Pacific and Asiatic Fleets.

Unlike Fiske, who had campaigned for a powerful, aggressive CNO sharing authority with the Navy secretary, Benson demonstrated personal loyalty to Secretary Daniels and subordinated himself to civilian control, yet maintained the CNO's autonomy where necessary. While alienating reformers like Sims and Fiske (who retired in 1916), Benson's conduct gave Daniels immense trust in his new CNO, and Benson was delegated greater resources and authority.

==== Achievements ====
Among the organizational efforts initiated or recommended by Benson included an advisory council to coordinate high-level staff activities, composed of himself, the SECNAV and the bureau chiefs which "worked out to the great satisfaction" of Daniels and Benson; the reestablishment of the Joint Army and Navy Board in 1918 with Benson as its Navy member; and the consolidation of all matters of naval aviation under the authority of the CNO.

Benson also revamped the structure of the naval districts, transferring authority for them from SECNAV to the Office of the Chief of Naval Operations under the Operations, Plans, Naval Districts division. This enabled closer cooperation between naval district commanders and the uniformed leadership, who could more easily handle communications between the former and the Navy's fleet commanders.

In the waning years of his tenure, Benson set regulations for officers on shore duty to have temporary assignments with the Office of the Chief of Naval Operations to maintain cohesion between the higher-level staff and the fleet.

==== Establishing OPNAV ====
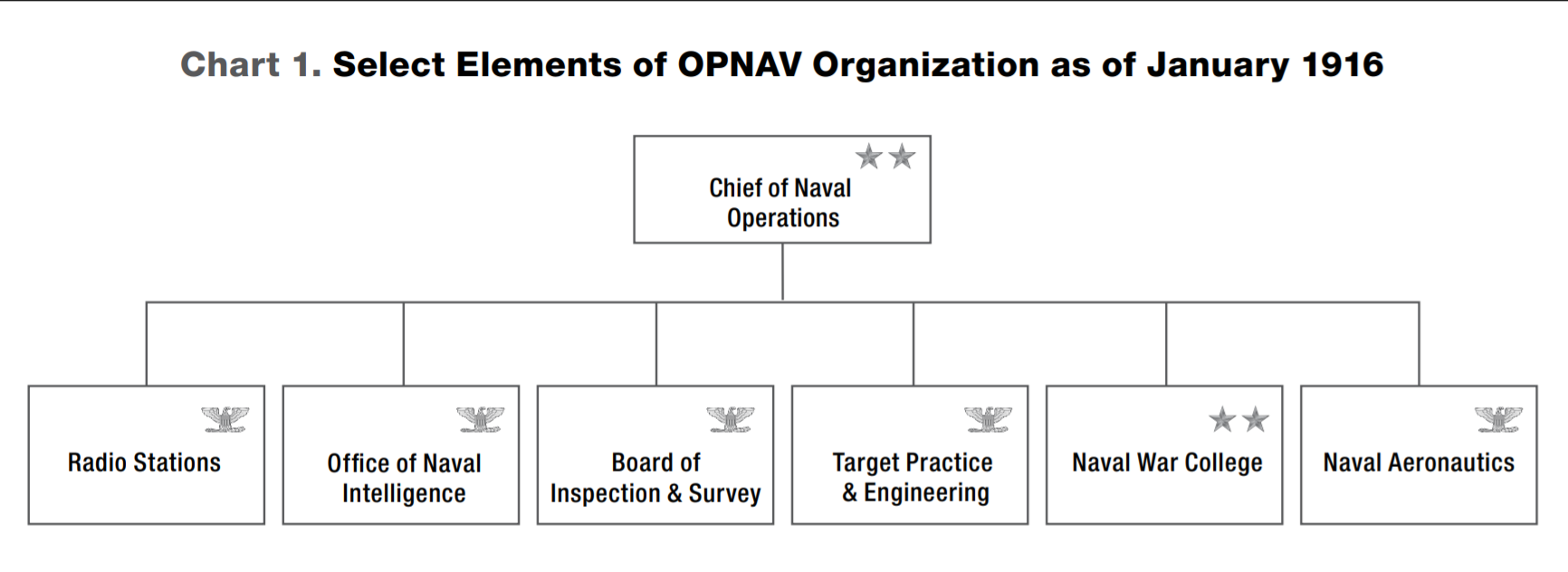
Organization of the Office of the Chief of Naval Operations as of January 1916

Until 1916, the CNO's office was chronically understaffed. The formal establishment of the CNO's "general staff", the Office of the Chief of Naval Operations (OPNAV), originally called the Office for Operations, was exacerbated by Eugene Hale's retirement from politics in 1911, and skepticism of whether the CNO's small staff could implement President Wilson's policy of "preparedness" without violating American neutrality in World War I.

By June 1916, OPNAV was organized into eight divisions: Operations, Plans, Naval Districts; Regulations; Ship Movements; Communications; Publicity; and Materiel. Operations provided a link between fleet commanders and the General Board, Ship Movements coordinated the movement of Navy vessels and oversaw navy yard overhauls, Communications accounted for the Navy's developing radio network, Publicity conducted the Navy's public affairs, and the Materiel section coordinated the work of the naval bureaus.

Numbering only 75 staffers in January 1917, OPNAV increased in size following the American entry into World War I, as it was deemed of great importance to manage the rapid mobilization of forces to fight in the war. By war's end, OPNAV employed over 1462 people. The CNO and OPNAV thus gained influence over Navy administration but at the expense of the Navy secretary and bureau chiefs.

==== Advisor to the president ====
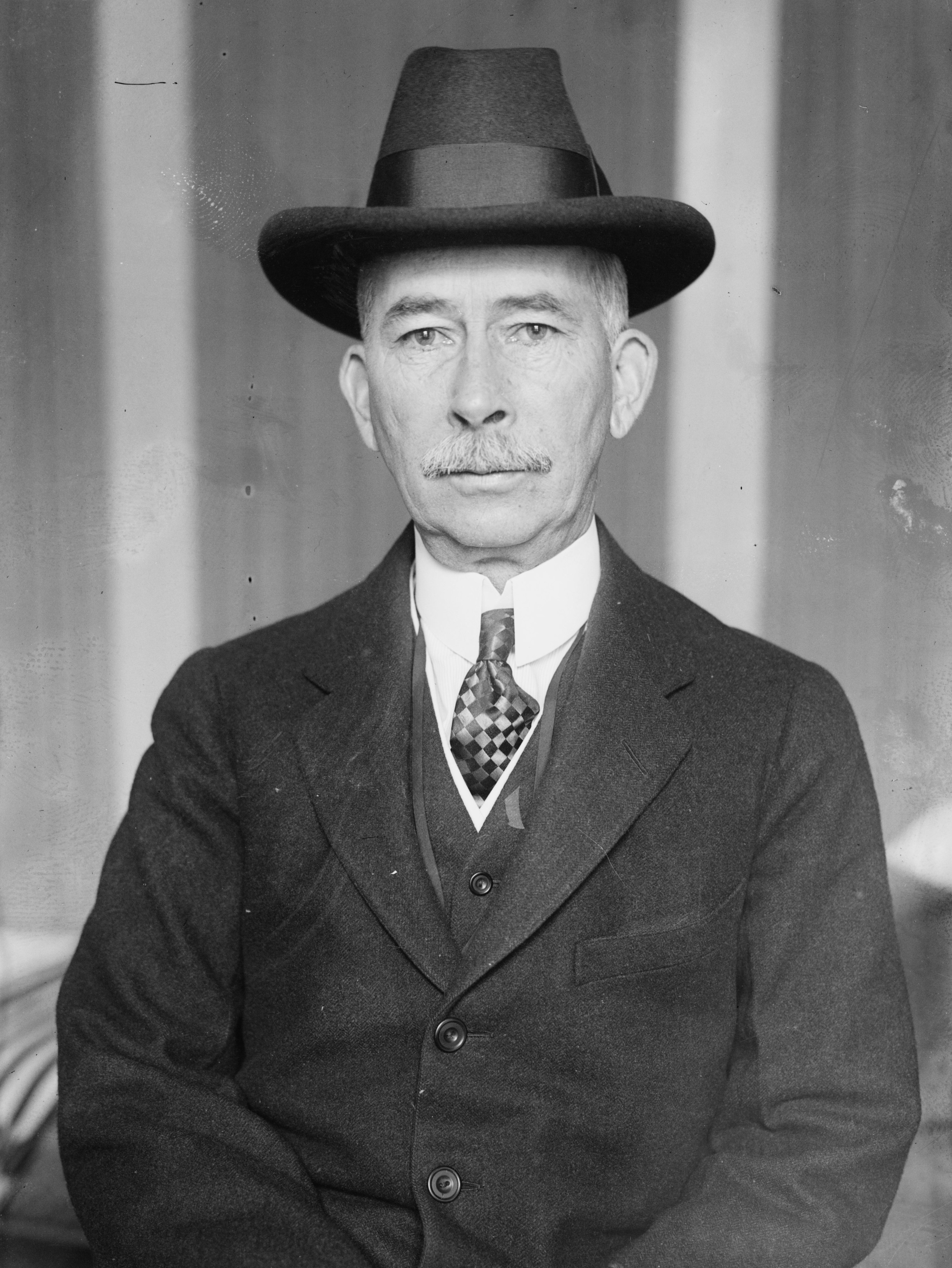
Edward M. House, also known as Colonel House, was a close advisor to President Woodrow Wilson, who helped him elevate the CNO's stature.

In 1918, Benson became a military advisor to Edward M. House, an advisor and confidant of President Wilson, joining him on a trip to Europe as the 1918 armistice with Germany was signed. His stance that the United States remain equal to Great Britain in naval power was very useful to House and Wilson, enough for Wilson to insist Benson remain in Europe until after the Treaty of Versailles was signed in July 1919.

==== End of tenure ====
Benson's tenure as CNO was slated to end on 10 May 1919, but this was delayed by the president at Secretary Daniels' insistence; Benson instead retired on 25 September 1919. Admiral Robert Coontz replaced Benson as CNO on 1 November 1919.

=== Interwar period (1919–1939) ===
The CNO's office faced no significant changes in authority during the interwar period, largely due to the Navy secretaries opting to keep executive authority within their own office. Innovations during this period included encouraging coordination in war planning process, and compliance with the Washington Naval Treaty while still keeping to the shipbuilding plan authorized by the Naval Act of 1916. and implementing the concept of naval aviation into naval doctrine.

==== CNO Pratt, relationship with the General Board and Army-Navy relations ====
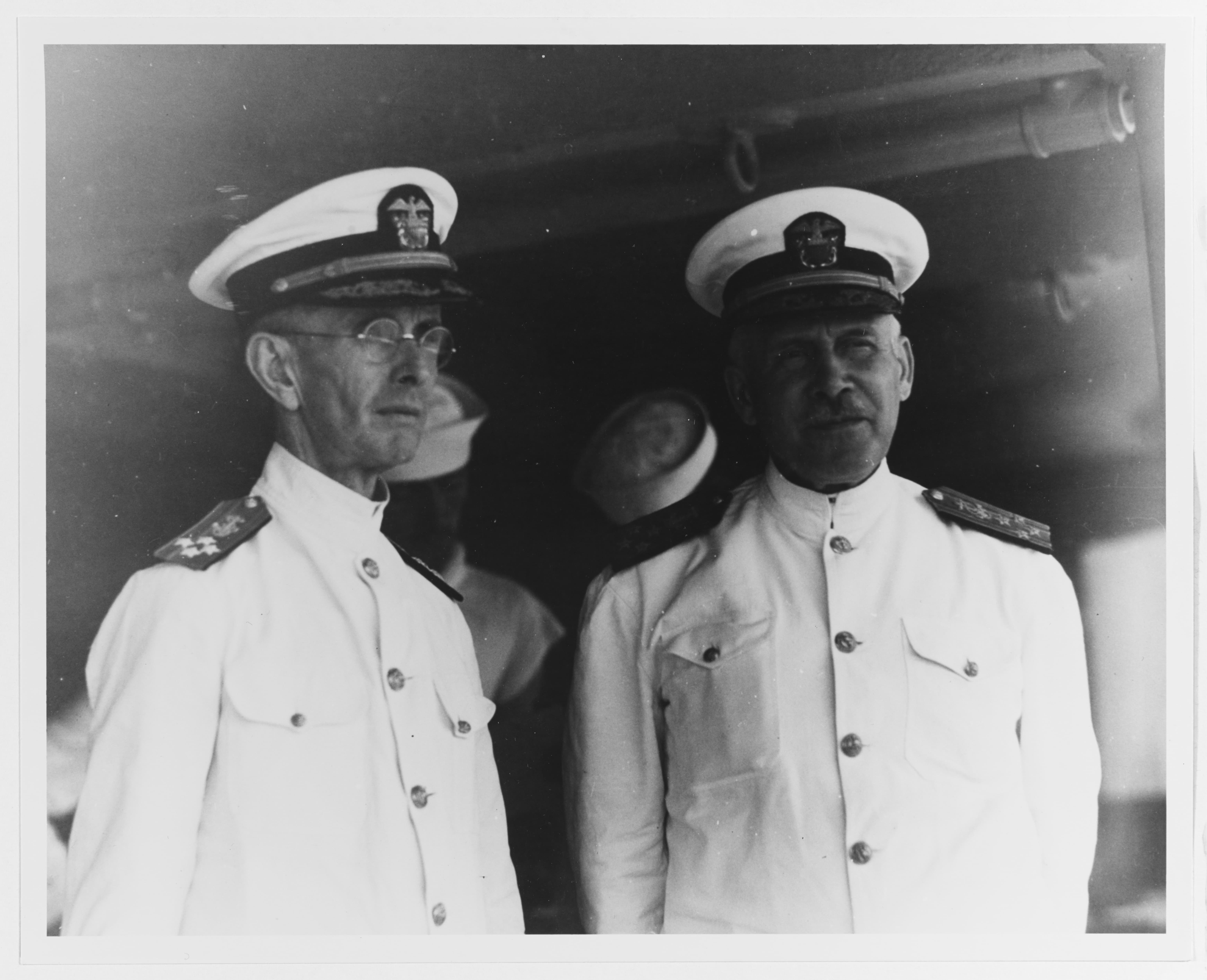
CNO Pratt (right) with Admiral Frank H. Schofield (left) aboard the Tennessee-class battleship USS California (BB-44) in February 1931

William V. Pratt became the fifth Chief of Naval Operations on 17 September 1930, after the resignation of Charles F. Hughes. He had previously served as assistant chief of naval operations under CNO Benson. A premier naval policymaker and supporter of arms control under the Washington Naval Treaty, Pratt, despite otherwise good relations, clashed with President Herbert Hoover over building up naval force strength to treaty levels, with Hoover favoring restrictions in spending due to financial difficulties caused by the Great Depression. Under Pratt, such a "treaty system" was needed to maintain a compliant peacetime navy.

Pratt opposed centralized management of the Navy, and encouraged diversity of opinion between the offices of the Navy secretary, CNO and the Navy's General Board. To this effect, Pratt removed the CNO as an ex officio member of the General Board, concerned that the office's association with the Board could hamper diversities of opinion between the former and counterparts within the offices of the Navy secretary and OPNAV. Pratt's vision of a less powerful CNO also clashed with Representative Carl Vinson of Georgia, chair of the House Naval Affairs Committee from 1931 to 1947, a proponent of centralizing power within OPNAV. Vinson deliberately delayed many of his planned reorganization proposals until Pratt's replacement by William H. Standley to avoid the unnecessary delays that would otherwise have happened with Pratt.

Pratt also enjoyed a good working relationship with Army chief of staff Douglas MacArthur, and negotiated several key agreements with him over coordinating their services' radio communications networks, mutual interests in coastal defense, and authority over Army and Navy aviation.

==== CNO Standley and the Vinson-Trammell act ====
William H. Standley (sitting) poses for his last photograph as Chief of Naval Operations on the day of his retirement, 29 December 1936.

William H. Standley, who succeeded Pratt in 1933, had a weaker relationship with President Franklin D. Roosevelt than Pratt enjoyed with Hoover. Often in direct conflict with Navy secretary Claude A. Swanson and assistant secretary Henry L. Roosevelt, Standley's hostility to the latter was described as "poisonous".

Conversely, Standley successfully improved relations with Congress, streamlining communications between the Department of the Navy and the naval oversight committees by appointing the first naval legislative liaisons, the highest-ranked of which reported to the judge advocate general. Standley also worked with Representative Vinson to pass the Vinson-Trammell Act, considered by Standley to be his most important achievement as CNO. The Act authorized the President:

“to suspend” construction of the ships authorized by the law “as may be necessary to bring the naval armament of the United States within the limitation so agreed upon, except that such suspension shall not apply to vessels actually under construction on the date of the passage of this act.”

This effectively provided security for all Navy vessels under construction; even if new shipbuilding projects could not be initiated, shipbuilders with new classes under construction could not legally be obliged to cease operations, allowing the Navy to prepare for World War II without breaking potential limits from future arms control conferences. The Act also granted the CNO "soft oversight power" of the naval bureaus which nominally lay with the secretary of the Navy, as Standley gradually inserted OPNAV into the ship design process. Under Standley, the "treaty system" created by Pratt was abandoned.

==== CNO Leahy ====
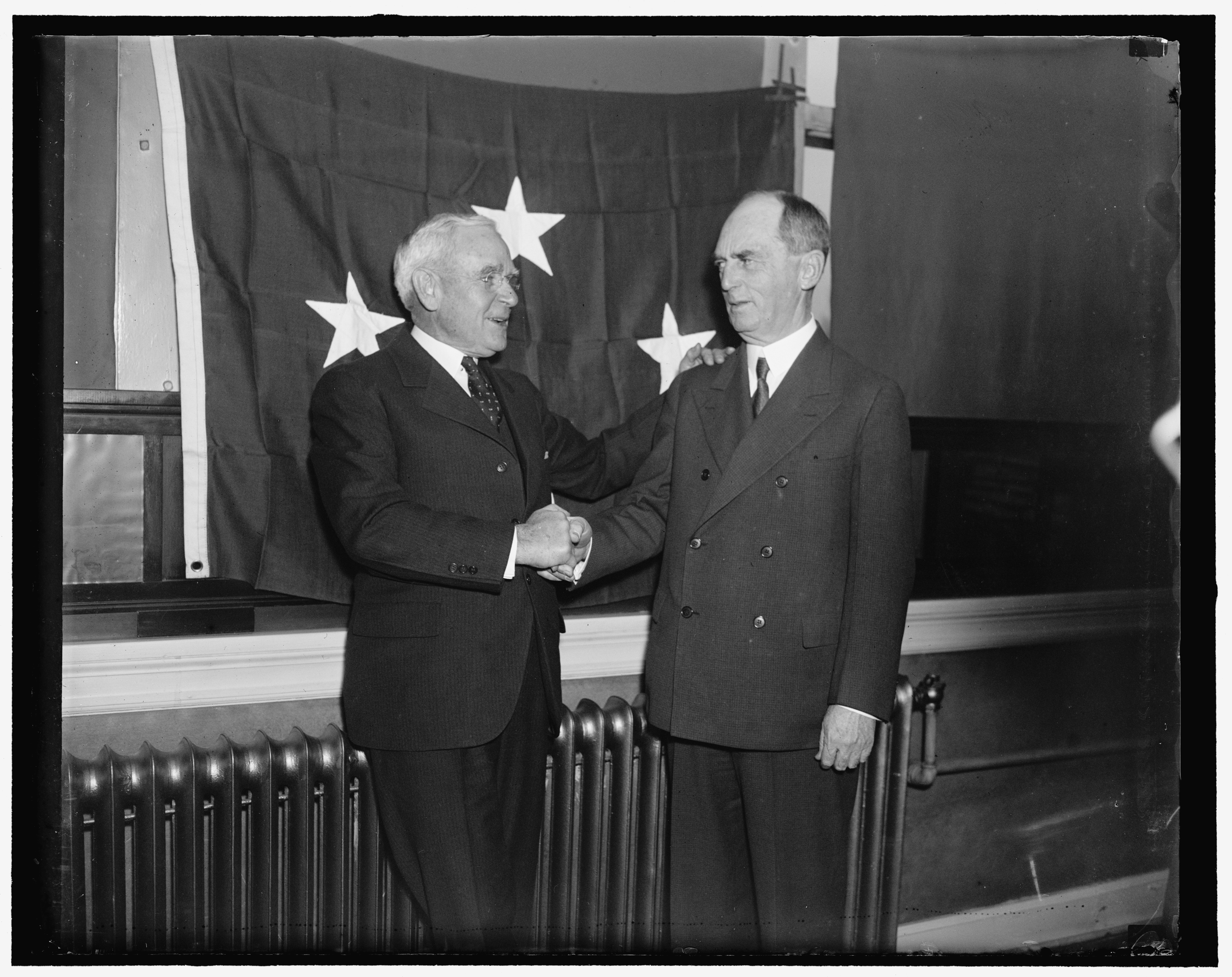
CNO Leahy and outgoing CNO Standley shake hands after Leahy is sworn in on 2 January 1937.

Outgoing commander, Battle Force William D. Leahy succeeded Standley as CNO on 2 January 1937. Leahy's close personal friendship with President Roosevelt since his days as Navy assistant secretary, as well as good relationships with Representative Vinson and Secretary Swanson brought him to the forefront of potential candidates for the post. Unlike Standley, who tried to dominate the bureaus, Leahy preferred to let the bureau chiefs function autonomously as per convention, with the CNO acting as a primus inter pares. Leahy's views of the CNO's authority led to clashes with his predecessor; Standley even attempted to block Leahy from being assigned a fleet command in retaliation. Leahy, on his part, continued Standley's efforts to insert the CNO into the ship design process.

Swanson's ill health and assistant secretary Henry Roosevelt's death on 22 February 1936 gave Leahy unprecedented influence. Leahy had private lunches with the President frequently; during his tenure as CNO, Roosevelt had 52 meetings with him, compared with 12 with his Army counterpart, General Malin Craig, none of which were private lunches.

Leahy retired from the Navy on 1 August 1939 to become Governor of Puerto Rico, a month before the invasion of Poland.

== Official residence ==
Number One Observatory Circle, located on the northeast grounds of the United States Naval Observatory in Washington, DC, was built in 1893 for its superintendent. The chief of naval operations liked the house so much that in 1923 he took over the house as his own official residence. It remained the residence of the CNO until 1974, when Congress authorized its transformation to an official residence for the vice president. The chief of naval operations currently resides in Quarters A in the Washington Naval Yard.

== Office of the Chief of Naval Operations ==
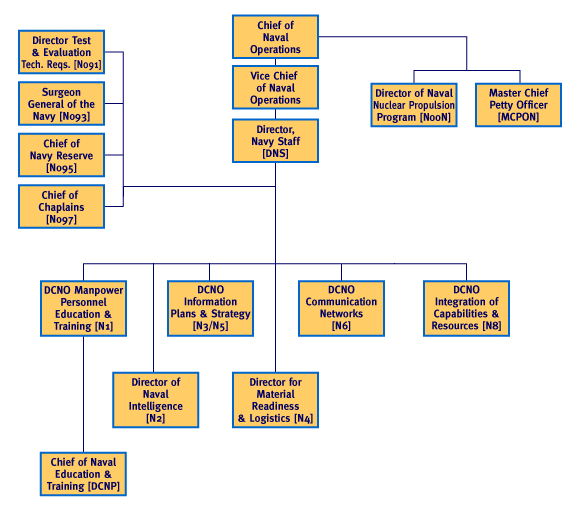
Organizational chart of the Office of the Chief of Naval Operations (OPNAV)

The chief of naval operations presides over the Navy Staff, formally known as the Office of the Chief of Naval Operations (OPNAV). The Office of the Chief of Naval Operations is a statutory organization within the executive part of the Department of the Navy, and its purpose is to furnish professional assistance to the secretary of the Navy (SECNAV) and the CNO in carrying out their responsibilities.

Under the authority of the CNO, the director of the Navy Staff (DNS) is responsible for day-to-day administration of the Navy Staff and coordination of the activities of the deputy chiefs of naval operations, who report directly to the CNO. The office was previously known as the assistant vice chief of naval operations (AVCNO) until 1996, when CNO Jeremy Boorda ordered its redesignation to its current name. Previously held by a three-star vice admiral, the position became a civilian's billet in 2018. The present DNS is a Vice Admiral Michael Boyle, a former 3rd Fleet commander.

== List of chiefs of naval operations ==
(† - died in office)

=== Aide for Naval Operations (historical predecessor office) ===
No.	Portrait	Aide for Naval Operations	Took office	Left office	Time in office	Secretaries of the Navy
1	Richard Wainwright	Rear Admiral; Richard Wainwright (1849–1926)	3 December 1909	12 December 1911	2 years, 9 days	George von Lengerke Meyer
2	Charles E. Vreeland	Rear Admiral; Charles E. Vreeland (1852–1916)	12 December 1911	11 February 1913	1 year, 61 days	George von Lengerke Meyer
3	Bradley A. Fiske	Rear Admiral; Bradley A. Fiske (1854–1942)	11 February 1913	1 April 1915	2 years, 49 days	George von Lengerke Meyer; Josephus Daniels

=== Chiefs of naval operations ===
No.	Portrait	Name	Term			Background	Secretaries served under:		Ref.
No.	Portrait	Name	Took office	Left office	Duration	Background	Navy	Defense	Ref.
1	William S. Benson	Admiral; William S. Benson (1855–1932)	11 May 1915	25 September 1919	4 years, 137 days	Battleships	Josephus Daniels	—	
Vacant (25 September 1919 – 1 November 1919)
2	Robert E. Coontz	Admiral; Robert E. Coontz (1864–1935)	1 November 1919	21 July 1923	3 years, 262 days	Battleships	Josephus Daniels; Edwin C. Denby	—	
3	Edward W. Eberle	Admiral; Edward W. Eberle (1864–1929)	21 July 1923	14 November 1927	4 years, 116 days	Battleships	Edwin C. Denby; Curtis D. Wilbur	—	
4	Charles F. Hughes	Admiral; Charles F. Hughes (1866–1934)	14 November 1927	17 September 1930 (resigned)	3 years, 3 days	Battleships	Curtis D. Wilbur; Charles F. Adams III	—	
5	William V. Pratt	Admiral; William V. Pratt (1869–1957)	17 September 1930	30 June 1933	2 years, 286 days	Battleships	Charles F. Adams III; Claude A. Swanson	—	
6	William H. Standley	Admiral; William H. Standley (1872–1963)	1 July 1933	1 January 1937	3 years, 184 days	Battleships	Claude A. Swanson	—	
7	William D. Leahy	Admiral; William D. Leahy (1875–1959)	2 January 1937	1 August 1939	2 years, 211 days	Battleships	Claude A. Swanson; Charles Edison	—	
8	Harold R. Stark	Admiral; Harold R. Stark (1880–1972)	1 August 1939	2 March 1942 (relieved)	2 years, 213 days	Battleships/Cruisers-Destroyers	Charles Edison; Frank Knox	—	
9	Ernest J. King	Fleet Admiral; Ernest J. King (1878–1956)	2 March 1942	15 December 1945	3 years, 288 days	Aviation	Frank Knox; James Forrestal	—	
10	Chester W. Nimitz	Fleet Admiral; Chester W. Nimitz (1885–1966)	15 December 1945	15 December 1947	2 years, 0 days	Submarines	James Forrestal; John L. Sullivan	James Forrestal (from Sep. 1947)	
11	Louis E. Denfeld	Admiral; Louis E. Denfeld (1891–1972)	15 December 1947	2 November 1949 (relieved)	1 year, 322 days	Submarines	John L. Sullivan; Francis P. Matthews	James Forrestal; Louis A. Johnson	
12	Forrest P. Sherman	Admiral; Forrest P. Sherman (1896–1951)	2 November 1949	22 July 1951 †	1 year, 262 days	Battleships/Cruisers-Destroyers	Francis P. Matthews	Louis A. Johnson; George C. Marshall	
–	Lynde D. McCormick	Admiral; Lynde D. McCormick (1895–1956); Acting (Note: In capacity as Vice Chief of Naval Operations.)	22 July 1951	16 August 1951	25 days	Battleships/Cruisers-Destroyers	Francis P. Matthews; Dan A. Kimball	George C. Marshall	
13	William M. Fechteler	Admiral; William M. Fechteler (1896–1967)	16 August 1951	17 August 1953	2 years, 1 day	Battleships/Cruisers-Destroyers	Dan A. Kimball; Robert B. Anderson	George C. Marshall; Robert A. Lovett	
14	Robert B. Carney	Admiral; Robert B. Carney (1895–1990)	17 August 1953	17 August 1955	2 years, 0 days	Battleships/Cruisers-Destroyers	Robert B. Anderson; Charles S. Thomas	Charles Erwin Wilson	
15	Arleigh A. Burke	Admiral; Arleigh A. Burke (1901–1996)	17 August 1955	1 August 1961	5 years, 349 days	Cruisers-Destroyers	Charles S. Thomas; Thomas S. Gates Jr. William B. Franke; John Connally	Charles Erwin Wilson; Neil H. McElroy; Thomas S. Gates Jr. Robert McNamara	
16	George W. Anderson Jr.	Admiral; George W. Anderson Jr. (1906–1992)	1 August 1961	1 August 1963 (relieved)	2 years, 0 days	Aviation	John Connally; Fred Korth	Robert McNamara	
17	David L. McDonald	Admiral; David L. McDonald (1906–1997)	1 August 1963	1 August 1967	4 years, 0 days	Aviation	Fred Korth; Paul Nitze	Robert McNamara	
18	Thomas H. Moorer	Admiral; Thomas H. Moorer (1912–2004)	1 August 1967	1 July 1970 (Note: Appointed as Chairman of the Joint Chiefs of Staff.)	2 years, 334 days	Aviation	Paul R. Ignatius; John Chafee	Robert McNamara; Clark Clifford; Melvin Laird	
19	Elmo R. Zumwalt	Admiral; Elmo R. Zumwalt (1920–2000)	1 July 1970	29 June 1974	3 years, 363 days	Cruisers-Destroyers	John Chafee; John Warner; J. William Middendorf	Melvin Laird; Elliot Richardson; James R. Schlesinger	
20	James L. Holloway III	Admiral; James L. Holloway III (1922–2019)	29 June 1974 (Note: Served prior as Vice Chief of Naval Operations.)	1 July 1978	4 years, 2 days	Aviation	J. William Middendorf; W. Graham Claytor Jr.	James R. Schlesinger; Donald Rumsfeld; Harold Brown	
21	Thomas B. Hayward	Admiral; Thomas B. Hayward (1924–2022)	1 July 1978	30 June 1982	3 years, 364 days	Aviation	W. Graham Claytor Jr. Edward Hidalgo; John Lehman	Harold Brown; Caspar Weinberger	
22	James D. Watkins	Admiral; James D. Watkins (1927–2012)	30 June 1982	30 June 1986	4 years, 0 days	Submarines	John Lehman	Caspar Weinberger	
23	Carlisle A.H. Trost	Admiral; Carlisle A.H. Trost (1930–2020)	1 July 1986	29 June 1990	3 years, 363 days	Submarines	John Lehman; Jim Webb; William L. Ball; Henry L. Garrett III	Caspar Weinberger; Frank Carlucci; Dick Cheney	
24	Frank B. Kelso II	Admiral; Frank B. Kelso II (1933–2013)	29 June 1990	23 April 1994	3 years, 298 days	Submarines	Henry L. Garrett III; Sean O'Keefe; John H. Dalton	Dick Cheney; Les Aspin; William J. Perry	
25	Jeremy M. Boorda	Admiral; Jeremy M. Boorda (1939–1996)	23 April 1994	16 May 1996 †	2 years, 23 days	Cruisers-Destroyers	John H. Dalton	William J. Perry	
–		Admiral; Jay L. Johnson (born 1946)	16 May 1996	2 August 1996	78 days	Aviation	John H. Dalton; Richard Danzig	William J. Perry; William Cohen	
26		Admiral; Jay L. Johnson (born 1946)	2 August 1996	21 July 2000	3 years, 354 days	Aviation	John H. Dalton; Richard Danzig	William J. Perry; William Cohen	
27	Vernon E. Clark	Admiral; Vernon E. Clark (born 1944)	21 July 2000	22 July 2005	5 years, 1 day	Cruisers-Destroyers	Richard Danzig; Gordon R. England	William Cohen; Donald Rumsfeld	
28	Michael G. Mullen	Admiral; Michael G. Mullen (born 1946)	22 July 2005	29 September 2007	2 years, 130 days	Cruisers-Destroyers	Gordon R. England; Donald C. Winter	Donald Rumsfeld; Robert Gates	
29	Gary Roughead	Admiral; Gary Roughead (born 1951)	29 September 2007	23 September 2011	3 years, 359 days	Cruisers-Destroyers	Donald C. Winter; Ray Mabus	Robert Gates; Leon Panetta	
30	Jonathan W. Greenert	Admiral; Jonathan W. Greenert (born 1953)	23 September 2011	18 September 2015	3 years, 360 days	Submarines	Ray Mabus	Leon Panetta; Chuck Hagel; Ash Carter	
31	John M. Richardson	Admiral; John M. Richardson (born 1960)	18 September 2015	22 August 2019	3 years, 338 days	Submarines	Ray Mabus; Richard V. Spencer	Ash Carter; Jim Mattis	
32	Michael M. Gilday	Admiral; Michael M. Gilday (born 1962)	22 August 2019	14 August 2023	3 years, 357 days	Cruisers-Destroyers/Cyberspace	Richard V. Spencer; Kenneth Braithwaite; Carlos Del Toro	Mark Esper; Lloyd Austin	
–		Admiral; Lisa M. Franchetti (born 1964)	14 August 2023	2 November 2023	80 days	Cruisers-Destroyers	Carlos Del Toro	Lloyd Austin; Pete Hegseth	
33		Admiral; Lisa M. Franchetti (born 1964)	2 November 2023	21 February 2025	1 year, 111 days	Cruisers-Destroyers	Carlos Del Toro	Lloyd Austin; Pete Hegseth	
–	James W. Kilby	Admiral; James W. Kilby (born 1963); Acting	21 February 2025	25 August 2025	185 days	Cruisers-Destroyers	John Phelan	Pete Hegseth	
34	Daryl L. Caudle	Admiral; Daryl L. Caudle (born 1963)	25 August 2025	Incumbent	1 year, 87 days	Submarines	John Phelan Hung Cao	Pete Hegseth	

== See also ==
- Master Chief Petty Officer of the Navy
- Organization of the US Marine Corps – Relationship with other uniformed services
- Structure of the United States Navy
- United States Fleet
- Vice Chief of Naval Operations
