= Lisa Franchetti =

American Navy admiral (born 1964)

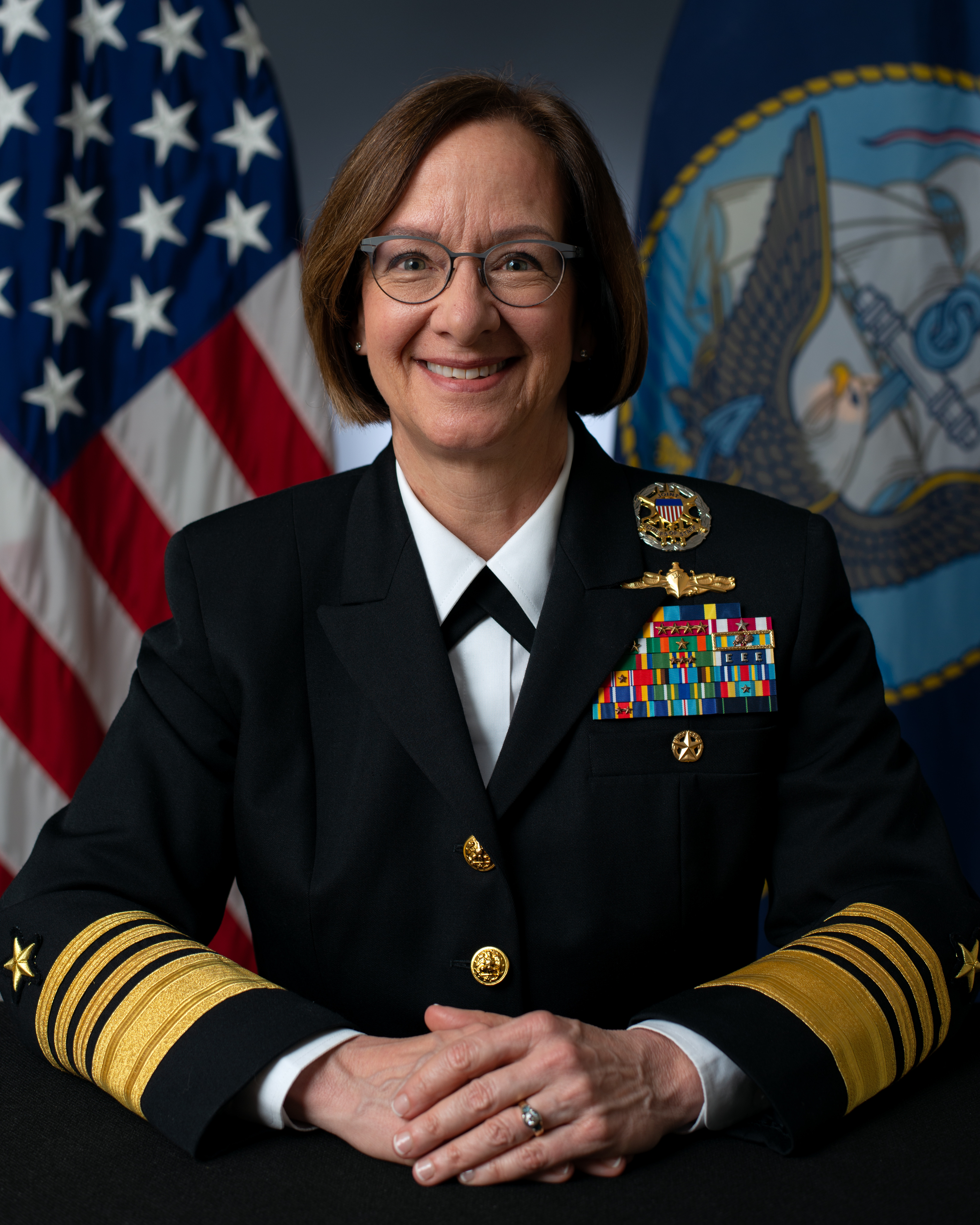
- Official portrait, 2024
- Born: 25 April 1964 (age 62); Rochester, New York, U.S.
- Allegiance: United States
- Branch: United States Navy
- Service years: 1985–2025
- Rank: Admiral
- Commands: Chief of Naval Operations; Vice Chief of Naval Operations; United States Sixth Fleet; Naval Striking and Support Forces NATO; Carrier Strike Group 15; Carrier Strike Group 9; United States Naval Forces Korea; Destroyer Squadron 21; USS Ross (DDG-71)
- Awards: Defense Distinguished Service Medal; Navy Distinguished Service Medal; Defense Superior Service Medal (2); Legion of Merit (5)
- Education: Northwestern University (BS); Naval War College (MA); University of Phoenix (MS)
- Lisa Franchetti's voice Franchetti's opening statement at her confirmation hearing to be chief of naval operations Recorded 14 September 2023

Lisa Marie Franchetti (/frænˈkɛti/ fran-KEH-ti; born 25 April 1964) is a retired United States Navy admiral, the first woman to lead the U.S. Navy, and the first woman member of the Joint Chiefs of Staff. She is also the first ROTC graduate to serve as chief of naval operations. Franchetti served as the 33rd chief of naval operations from 2 November 2023 to 21 February 2025 before being removed by the secretary of defense, Pete Hegseth.

Franchetti was the 42nd vice chief of naval operations from September 2022 to November 2023 and as acting chief of naval operations (CNO) from August to November 2023.

A surface warfare officer, Franchetti served as director for strategy, plans, and policy of the Joint Staff (J5) from 2020 to 2022, the second deputy chief of naval operations for war-fighting development in 2020, and commander of the United States sixth fleet from 2018 to 2020. She also commanded carrier strike groups and U.S. Naval Forces Korea during her career. Franchetti was the second woman promoted to four-star admiral in the United States Navy and the second woman to serve as vice chief of naval operations in the history of the U.S. Navy.

== Early life and education ==
Franchetti, who is of Italian heritage, was born on 25 April 1964, in Rochester, New York. While at Northwestern, she was a coxswain on the crew and joined the Naval Reserve Officer Training Corps Program. She was commissioned in 1985.

Franchetti earned a Bachelor of Science in journalism from the Medill School of Journalism at Northwestern University in 1985. She went on to earn a master's degree in national security and strategic studies from the Naval War College in Newport, Rhode Island, and another in organizational management from the University of Phoenix.

Franchetti was awarded an honorary Doctor of Humane Letters by Northwestern University in June 2025.

== Navy career ==
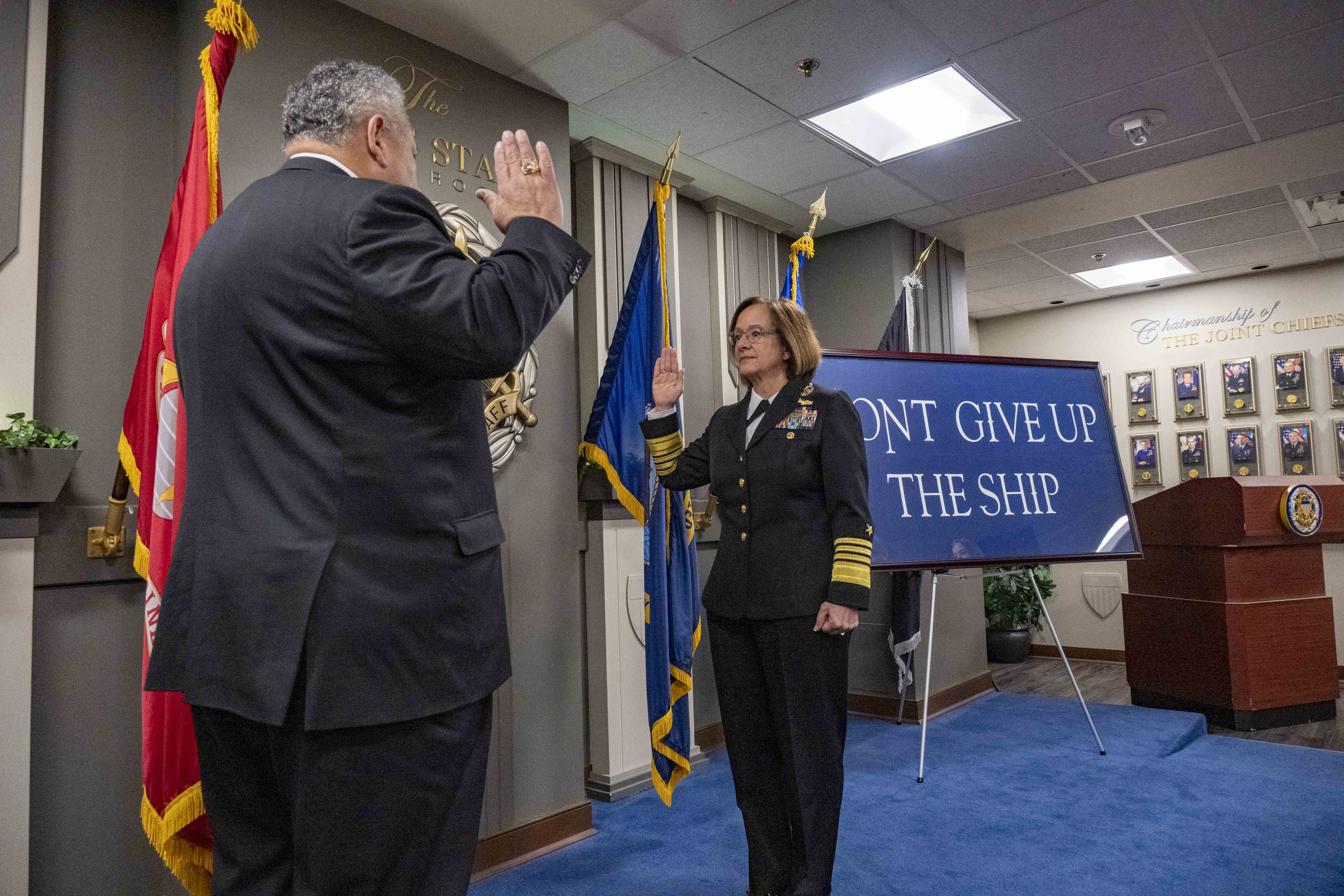
Franchetti is sworn in as the 33rd chief of naval operations on 2 November 2023

Franchetti's operational assignments have included auxiliaries officer and first division officer in USS Shenandoah (AD-44), navigator and jumboization coordinator in USS Monongahela (AO-178), operations officer in USS Moosbrugger (DD-980), combat systems officer and chief staff officer for Destroyer Squadron (DESRON) 2, executive officer of USS Stout (DDG-55), and assistant surface operations officer on the USS George Washington Carrier Strike Group staff. She commanded USS Ross (DDG-71) and Destroyer Squadron 21, embarked in USS John C. Stennis (CVN-74). She also served as commander of Pacific Partnership 2010, embarked in USNS Mercy (T-AH-19).

Ashore, she has been assigned as commander of United States Naval Reserve Center Central Point, Oregon; aide to the Vice Chief of Naval Operations; protocol officer for the commander of United States Atlantic Fleet; 4th Battalion officer at the United States Naval Academy; division chief of Joint Concept Development and Experimentation on the Joint Staff, J7; deputy director of International Engagement and executive assistant to N3/N5 on the Navy staff; and military assistant to the Secretary of the Navy.

Since promotion to flag rank, Franchetti has held appointments as commander of United States Naval Forces Korea; commander Carrier Strike Group 9; commander of Carrier Strike Group 15; chief of staff, Joint Staff, J-5, Strategy, Plans and Policy; commander of United States Sixth Fleet, Naval Striking and Support Forces NATO; deputy commander, United States Naval Forces Europe; deputy commander of United States Naval Forces Africa; and joint force maritime component commander

During her time as commander of the U.S. Sixth Fleet, based in Italy, Franchetti oversaw the first-ever use of Tomahawk missiles launched by a Virginia-class submarine. The missiles were fired from USS John Warner at targets in Syria.

On 6 May 2020, Franchetti was nominated as deputy chief of naval operations for Warfighting development (OPNAV N7), while keeping her other roles.

In April 2022, Franchetti was nominated for promotion to admiral and appointment as Vice Chief of Naval Operations. The Senate confirmed her promotion in May 2022. She assumed the position on 2 September 2022.

On 21 July 2023, President Biden nominated her to replace Michael M. Gilday as chief of naval operations (CNO). On August 14, 2023, upon Gilday's retirement, Franchetti became acting CNO. Franchetti was confirmed by the Senate to become the CNO on 2 November 2023, and was sworn in on the same day, becoming the first female CNO and, due to having that position, the first woman on the Joint Chiefs of Staff.

On 21 February 2025, Franchetti was fired from her position by Pete Hegseth, the secretary of defense, without explanation. Franchetti retired from the Navy in April 2025 after over 40 years of service.

== Personal life ==
Franchetti is married to James Sievert and has one child. She enjoys running for relaxation and exercise.

In June 2024, after a routine mammogram screening, the 60-year-old admiral was diagnosed with early-stage breast cancer. When she underwent outpatient surgery in July 2024, she temporarily transferred her authority to the vice chief of naval operations, Adm. James Kilby. She completed radiation therapy and in September 2024 began maintenance endocrine therapy.

"I am grateful for my wonderful team of doctors at John P. Murtha Cancer Center for their excellent care and their development of a treatment plan that allows me to continue leading the world's greatest Navy", Franchetti said in a statement. "I am blessed that this was detected early and will forever be an advocate for early and routine screening".

== Awards and decorations ==

Joint Chiefs of Staff Badge
Surface Warfare Officer Pin
Defense Distinguished Service Medal	Navy Distinguished Service Medal	Defense Superior Service Medal with one bronze oak leaf cluster
Legion of Merit with four gold award stars	Meritorious Service Medal with silver award star	Navy and Marine Corps Commendation Medal with three award stars
Navy and Marine Corps Achievement Medal with award star	Joint Meritorious Unit Award with two oak leaf clusters	Navy Unit Commendation
Navy Meritorious Unit Commendation with three bronze service star	Navy E Ribbon with three Battle E devices	National Defense Service Medal with service star
Armed Forces Expeditionary Medal	Global War on Terrorism Expeditionary Medal	Global War on Terrorism Service Medal
Korea Defense Service Medal	Navy Sea Service Deployment Ribbon with five service stars	Navy and Marine Corps Overseas Service Ribbon with two service stars
Special Operations Service Ribbon	Order of National Security Merit, Cheonsu Medal (Republic of Korea)	Navy Rifle Marksmanship Ribbon
Command at Sea insignia

This article incorporates public domain material from the United States Navy document "US Navy Biography: Vice Admiral Lisa M. Franchetti" (2018-03-07). Retrieved 2018-10-08.

Military offices
Preceded by William McQuilkin	Commander of United States Naval Forces Korea; 2013–2015	Succeeded by William D. Byrne Jr.
Preceded by Patrick Piercey	Commander of Carrier Strike Group 9; 2015–2016	Succeeded by James S. Bynum
Preceded by Christopher Barnes; Acting	Commander of Carrier Strike Group 15; 2016	Succeeded by Ross A. Myers
Preceded by Christopher W. Grady	Commander of the United States Sixth Fleet and Naval Striking and Support Forces NATO; 2018–2020	Succeeded by Eugene H. Black III
Preceded by David W. Allvin	Director for Strategy, Plans, and Policy of the Joint Staff; 2020–2022	Succeeded by Stephen Koehler
Preceded by William K. Lescher	Vice Chief of Naval Operations; 2022–2023	Succeeded by James W. Kilby
Preceded by Michael M. Gilday	Chief of Naval Operations; 2023–2025	Succeeded by James W. Kilby; Acting
