= James Kilby =

U.S. Navy admiral (born 1963)

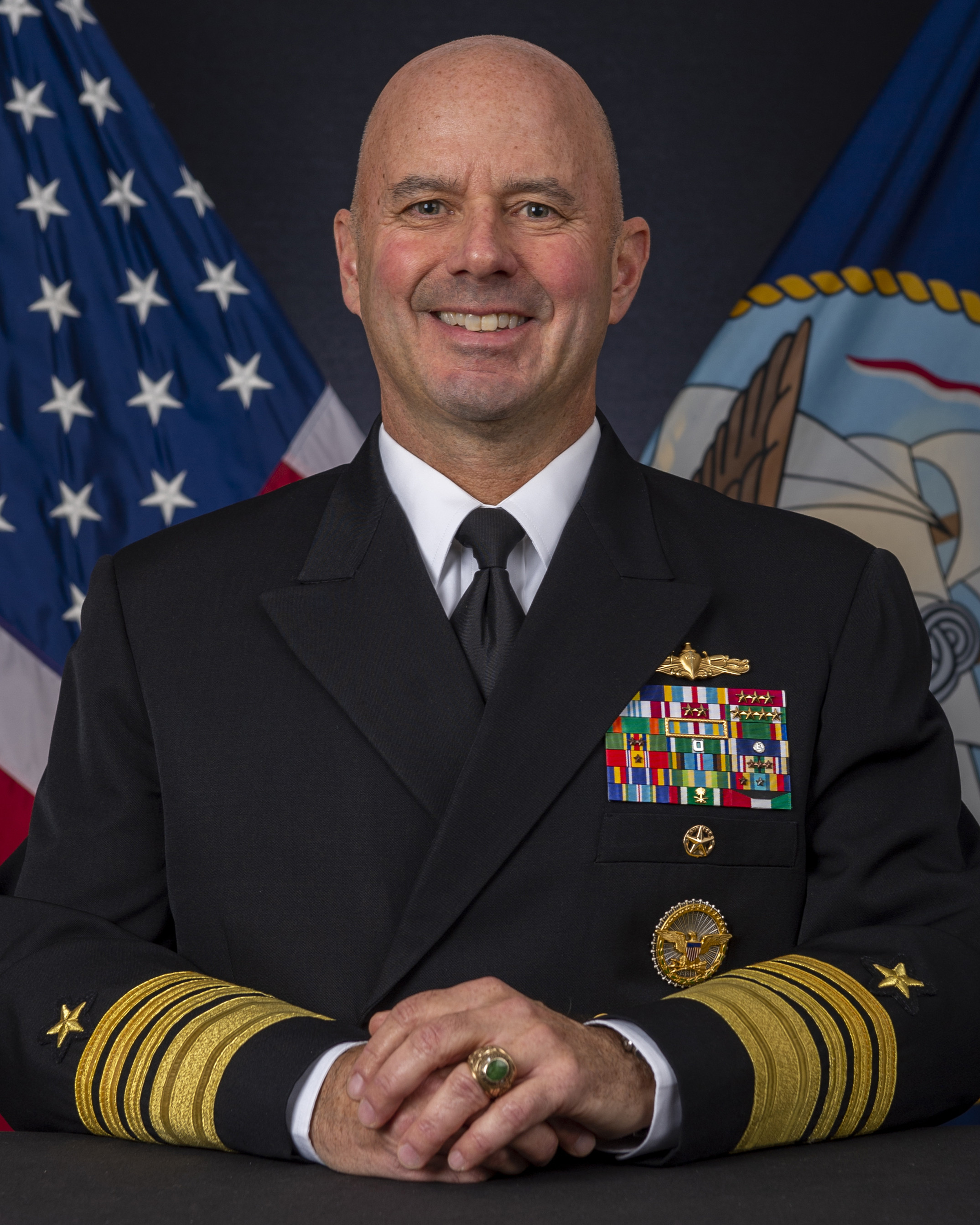
- Born: 1963 (age 62–63)
- Education: United States Naval Academy (BS)
- Military career
- Allegiance: United States
- Branch: United States Navy
- Service years: 1986–present
- Rank: Admiral
- Commands: Vice Chief of Naval Operations; Carrier Strike Group 1 Naval Surface and Mine Warfighting Development Center; USS Monterey; USS Russell
- Conflicts: Gulf War
- Awards: Navy Distinguished Service Medal; Defense Superior Service Medal; Legion of Merit (4)

James Wells Kilby (born 1963) is a United States Navy admiral who served as the acting chief of naval operations in 2025, and as the vice chief of naval operations since 2024. He previously served as the deputy commander of the United States Fleet Forces Command from 2021 to 2024.

== Early life and education ==
Raised in Pound Ridge, New York, Kilby is a 1986 graduate of the United States Naval Academy.

== Naval career ==
Kilby's sea tours include USS Sampson (DDG-10), USS Philippine Sea (CG 58) and two tours aboard USS San Jacinto (CG 56). He commanded USS Russell (DDG 59) where he received the Vice Adm. James B. Stockdale Award for inspirational leadership. His major command was aboard USS Monterey (CG 61) and included its maiden Ballistic Missile Defense (BMD) deployment in 2011.

His shore tours include the Naval Postgraduate School; two tours in the Chief of Naval Operations' Surface Warfare Directorate, N96; Navy Personnel Command's Surface Warfare Division, PERS-41; and the Aegis BMD Program Office in the Missile Defense Agency.

Kilby's flag assignments include Commander, Naval Surface and Mine Warfighting Development Center; Commander, Carrier Strike Group 1; director of Warfare Integration, N9I; Deputy Chief of Naval Operations for Warfighting Requirements and Capabilities, N9; Deputy Commander, U.S. Fleet Forces Command; and Commander, Task Force Eight Zero.

In July 2021, he was nominated to succeed David Kriete as deputy commander of the United States Fleet Forces Command. In July 2023, he was nominated for promotion to admiral and assignment as Vice Chief of Naval Operations. Kilby assumed the duties of vice chief of naval operations on January 5, 2024.

=== Acting chief of naval operations ===
He became the acting chief of naval operations on February 21, 2025, when President Donald Trump removed Admiral Lisa Franchetti from that post. Kilby has said that he will work towards achieving the goal of his predecessor to get 80% of the Navy's ships to be ready for a combat deployment at any moment.

In April 2025 he attended the Sea-Air-Space exposition hosted by the Navy League of the United States, where he met with the chief of staff of the Spanish Navy, in his capacity as the acting chief of naval operations. At the exposition he also said that the Navy will work on developing a more cost-efficient way of countering drones, after its experience during the Red Sea crisis. In May 2025, Kilby's tenure as acting chief of naval operations became the longest time that the Navy went without a leader confirmed by the Senate. He remained as the acting chief until August 25, 2025, when Daryl Caudle was sworn in following his confirmation.

== Awards and decorations ==

Surface Warfare Officer Pin
Navy Distinguished Service Medal	Defense Superior Service Medal	Legion of Merit with three gold award stars
Defense Meritorious Service Medal	Meritorious Service Medal with two gold award stars	Navy and Marine Corps Commendation Medal with four award stars
Navy and Marine Corps Achievement Medal	Joint Meritorious Unit Award	Navy Unit Commendation
Navy Meritorious Unit Commendation with two bronze service star	Coast Guard Meritorious Unit Commendation with Operational Distinguishing Device	Battle Effectiveness Award 4th awards
National Defense Service Medal with service star	Armed Forces Expeditionary Medal	Southwest Asia Service Medal with three bronze service stars
Global War on Terrorism Service Medal	Armed Forces Service Medal	Sea Service Deployment Ribbon with six service stars
Special Operations Service Ribbon	Kuwait Liberation Medal (Saudi Arabia)	Kuwait Liberation Medal (Kuwait)
Command at Sea insignia
Office of the Secretary of Defense Identification Badge

Military offices
Preceded by James T. Loeblein	Commander of Carrier Strike Group 1; 2016–2017	Succeeded by John V. Fuller
Preceded by Lisa Franchetti	Vice Chief of Naval Operations; 2024–present	Incumbent
Preceded by Lisa Franchetti	Chief of Naval Operations; Acting; 2025	Succeeded by Daryl Caudle
