= List of United States Navy vice admirals from 2010 to 2019 =

Flag of a Navy vice admiral

The rank of vice admiral (or three-star admiral) is the second-highest rank normally achievable in the United States Navy, and the first to have a specified number of appointments set by statute. It ranks above rear admiral (two-star admiral) and below admiral (four-star admiral).

There have been 120 vice admirals in the U.S. Navy from 2010 to 2019, 20 of whom were promoted to four-star admiral. All 120 achieved that rank while on active duty in the U.S. Navy. Admirals entered the Navy via several paths: 75 were commissioned via the U.S. Naval Academy (USNA), 27 via Naval Reserve Officers Training Corps (NROTC) at a civilian university, five via Officer Candidate School (OCS), four via Aviation Officer Candidate School (AOCS), four via direct commission (direct), one via NROTC at a senior military college, one via the U.S. Air Force Academy (USAFA), and one via direct commission inter-service transfer from the United States Army (USA).

== List of admirals ==
Entries in the following list of vice admirals are indexed by the numerical order in which each officer was promoted to that rank while on active duty, or by an asterisk (*) if the officer did not serve in that rank while on active duty. Each entry lists the admiral's name, date of rank, (Note: Dates of rank are taken, where available, from the U.S. Navy register of active and retired commissioned officers, or from the monthly U.S. Navy flag officer roster. The date listed is that of the officer's first promotion to vice admiral. If such a date that qualifies for the above cannot be found, the next date substituted should be that of the officer's assumption of his/her first three-star appointment. Failing which, the officer's first Senate confirmation date to vice admiral should be substituted. For officers promoted to vice admiral on the same date, they should be organized first by officers promoted to four-star rank, number of years spent as a vice admiral, then by the tier of their first listed assignment upon promotion to vice admiral (joint assignments followed by service assignments).) active-duty positions held while serving at three-star rank, (Note: Positions listed are those held by the officer when promoted to vice admiral. Dates listed are for the officer's full tenure, which may predate promotion to three-star rank or postdate retirement from active duty. Positions held in an acting capacity are italicized.) number of years of active-duty service at three-star rank (Yrs), (Note: The number of years of active-duty service at three-star rank is approximated by subtracting the year in the "Date of rank" column from the last year in the "Position" column. Time spent between active-duty three-star assignments is not counted.) year commissioned and source of commission, (Note: The year commissioned is taken to be the year the officer graduated from the U.S. Naval Academy, or equivalent. Sources of commission are listed in parentheses after the year of commission and include: the United States Naval Academy (USNA); Naval Reserve Officers Training Corps (NROTC) at a civilian university; NROTC at a senior military college such as the Virginia Military Institute (VMI), Norwich University (Norwich), Pennsylvania Military College (PMC), or Widener University (Widener); Officer Candidate School (OCS); Aviation Officer Candidate School (AOCS); warrant; the Massachusetts Maritime Academy (MMA); United States Military Academy (USMA); and the United States Air Force Academy (USAFA).) number of years in commission when promoted to three-star rank (YC), (Note: The number of years in commission before being promoted to three-star rank is approximated by subtracting the year in the "Commission" column from the year in the "Date of rank" column.) and other biographical notes. (Note: Notes include years of birth and death; awards of the Medal of Honor, Congressional Gold Medal, Presidential Medal of Freedom, or honors of similar significance; major government appointments; university presidencies or equivalents; familial relationships with significant military officers or significant government officials such as U.S. Presidents, cabinet secretaries, U.S. Senators, or state governors; and unusual career events such as premature relief or death in office.)

List of U.S. Navy vice admirals from 2010 to 2019
#	Name	Photo	Date of rank	Position	Yrs	Commission	YC	Notes
1	John T. Blake		Jan 2010	Deputy Chief of Naval Operations, Integration of Capabilities and Resources (DCNO N8), 2009–2012.	2	1975 (USNA)	35	(1953– )
2	Michael A. Lefever		Jan 2010	Commander and Senior Military Representative, U.S. Embassy Islamabad, 2008–2011.; Deputy Director, Strategic Operational Planning, National Counterterrorism Center, 2011–2014.	3	1976 (USNA)	34	(1954– )
3	William R. Burke		Apr 2010	Deputy Chief of Naval Operations, Fleet Readiness and Logistics (DCNO N4), 2010–2012.; Deputy Chief of Naval Operations, Warfare Systems (DCNO N9), 2012–2013.	3	1978 (USNA)	32	(1956– )
4	Carol M. Pottenger		7 May 2010	Deputy Chief of Staff for Capability Development, Headquarters Supreme Allied Commander Transformation (DCOFS-CD), 2010–2013.	3	1977 (NROTC)	33	(1955– )
5	Allen G. Myers IV		1 Jul 2010	Commander, Naval Air Forces/Commander, Naval Air Force, U.S. Pacific Fleet (COMNAVAIRFOR/COMNAVAIRPAC), 2010–2012.; Deputy Chief of Naval Operations, Integration of Capabilities and Resources (DCNO N8), 2012–2014.	4	1978 (USAFA)	32	
6	Mark I. Fox		5 Jul 2010	Commander, U.S. Naval Forces Central Command/Commander, U.S. Fifth Fleet/Commander, Combined Maritime Forces (COMUSNAVCENT/COMFIFTHFLT/COMCMF), 2010–2012.; Deputy Chief of Naval Operations, Operations, Plans, and Strategy (DCNO N3/N5), 2012–2013.; Deputy Commander, U.S. Central Command (DCDRUSCENTCOM), 2013–2016.	6	1978 (USNA)	32	(1956– ) Director, White House Military Office, 2005–2006.
7	Michael H. Miller		3 Aug 2010	Superintendent, U.S. Naval Academy, 2010–2014.	4	1974 (USNA)	36	(1952– ) Director, White House Military Office, 2002–2005.
8	Daniel P. Holloway Jr.		5 Aug 2010	Commander, U.S. Second Fleet/Director, Combined Joint Operations from the Sea Center of Excellence (COMSECONDFLT/DIRCJOS COE), 2010–2011.	1	1978 (USNA)	32	(1956– )
9	William E. Landay III		5 Aug 2010	Director, Defense Security Cooperation Agency (DIRDSCA), 2010–2013.	3	1978 (USNA)	32	(1956– )
10	Charles J. Leidig Jr.		5 Aug 2010	Deputy to the Commander for Military Operations, U.S. Africa Command, 2010–2013.	3	1978 (USNA)	32	(1955– )
11	W. Mark Skinner		5 Aug 2010	Principal Military Deputy to the Assistant Secretary of the Navy (Research, Development, and Acquisition) (PMD ASN(RDA)), 2010–2013.	3	1977 (USNA)	33	(1955– )
12	Scott R. Van Buskirk		10 Sep 2010	Commander, U.S. Seventh Fleet (COMSEVENTHFLT), 2010–2011.; Deputy Chief of Naval Operations, Manpower, Personnel, Training and Education/Chief of Naval Personnel (DCNO N1/CNP), 2011–2013.	3	1979 (USNA)	31	(1959– )
*	Cecil D. Haney		3 Nov 2010	Deputy Commander, U.S. Strategic Command (DCDRUSSTRATCOM), 2010–2011.	2	1978 (USNA)	32	(1955– ) (Note: Served as a combatant commander (CCDR).) Promoted to admiral, 20 Jan 2012.
*	John M. Richardson		5 Nov 2010	Commander, Submarine Forces/Commander, Submarine Force Atlantic/Commander, Allied Submarine Command/Commander, Task Force 144/Commander, Task Force 84 (COMSUBFOR/COMSUBLANT/COMASC/CTF-144/CTF-84), 2010–2012.	2	1982 (USNA)	28	(1960– ) (Note: Promoted directly from rank of rear admiral (lower half).) (Note: Served as Director, Naval Reactors.) (Note: Served as Chief of Naval Operations (CNO).) Promoted to admiral, 2 Nov 2012.
13	James P. Wisecup		18 Apr 2011	Naval Inspector General (NAVIG), 2011–2013.	2	1977 (USNA)	34	(1954– ) President, Naval War College, 2008–2011; Director, Chief of Naval Operations Strategic Studies Group, 2013–2016.
14	Gerald R. Beaman		21 Apr 2011	Commander, U.S. Third Fleet (COMTHIRDFLT), 2011–2013.	2	1974 (NROTC)	34	(1952– ) (Note: On temporary departure from active duty with Federal Bureau of Investigation (FBI), 1981–1984; re-commissioned in U.S. Navy as lieutenant, August 1984.)
15	David H. Buss		26 May 2011	Deputy Commander, U.S. Fleet Forces Command/Commander, Task Force 20/Director, Combined Joint Operations from the Sea Center of Excellence (DCOMUSFF/CTF-20/DIRCJOS COE), 2011–2012.; Commander, Naval Air Forces/Commander, Naval Air Force, U.S. Pacific Fleet (COMNAVAIRFOR/COMNAVAIRPAC), 2012–2015.	4	1978 (USNA)	33	(1956– )
16	Kendall L. Card		Jun 2011	Deputy Chief of Naval Operations, Information Dominance/Director of Naval Intelligence (DCNO N2/N6/DNI), 2011–2013.	2	1977 (NROTC)	34	(1955– )
*	Scott H. Swift		7 Sep 2011	Commander, U.S. Seventh Fleet (COMSEVENTHFLT), 2011–2013.; Director, Navy Staff (DNS), 2013–2015.	4	1979 (AOCS)	32	(1959– ) Promoted to admiral, 27 May 2015.
*	Michael S. Rogers		30 Sep 2011	Commander, U.S. Fleet Cyber Command/Commander, U.S. Tenth Fleet (COMFCC/COMTENTHFLT), 2011–2014.; Commander, U.S. Fleet Cyber Command/Commander, U.S. Tenth Fleet/Commander, Joint Force Headquarters – Cyber (Navy) (COMFCC/COMTENTHFLT/CDRJFHQ-C), 2014.	3	1981 (NROTC)	30	(1959– ) Promoted to admiral, 3 Apr 2014.
17	Frank C. Pandolfe		3 Oct 2011	Commander, U.S. Sixth Fleet/Commander, Task Force Six/Commander, Naval Striking and Support Forces NATO/Deputy Commander, U.S. Naval Forces Europe/Deputy Commander, U.S. Naval Forces Africa/Joint Force Maritime Component Commander Europe (COMSIXTHFLT/CTF-6/COMSTRIKFORNATO/DCOMUSNAVEUR/DCOMUSNAVAF/JFMCC Europe), 2011–2013.; Director, Strategic Plans and Policy, Joint Staff, J5/Senior Member, U.S. Delegation to the U.N. Military Staff Committee (Sr. Member MSC), 2013–2015.; Assistant to the Chairman of the Joint Chiefs of Staff (ACJCS), 2015–2017.	6	1980 (USNA)	31	(1958– )
18	Matthew L. Nathan		18 Nov 2011	Surgeon General, U.S. Navy/Chief, Bureau of Medicine and Surgery (SGN/BUMED), 2011–2015.	4	1981 (direct)	30	Medical Corps.
19	Timothy M. Giardina		20 Dec 2011	Deputy Commander, U.S. Strategic Command (DCDRUSSTRATCOM), 2011–2013.	2	1979 (USNA)	32	(1957– ) (Note: Relieved, October 2013, and retired as rear admiral, July 2015.) Relieved, 2013.
20	William D. French		3 Feb 2012	Commander, Navy Installations Command (CNIC), 2012–2014.	2	1979 (NROTC)	33	(1954– )
21	Philip H. Cullom		17 Feb 2012	Deputy Chief of Naval Operations, Fleet Readiness and Logistics (DCNO N4), 2012–2017.	5	1979 (USNA)	33	(1957– ) (Note: Nomination as U.S. Assistant Secretary of Defense for Energy, Installations, and Environment withdrawn, 2016.)
22	Charles W. Martoglio		17 Feb 2012	Deputy Commander, U.S. European Command (DCDRUSEUCOM), 2012–2014.	2	1978 (USNA)	34	(1956– )
23	John W. Miller		24 May 2012	Commander, U.S. Naval Forces Central Command/Commander, U.S. Fifth Fleet/Commander, Combined Maritime Forces (COMUSNAVCENT/C5F/CCMF), 2012–2015.	3	1979 (USNA)	33	(1957– ) (Note: Nomination as Deputy Chief of Naval Operations for Plans, Policy, and Operations confirmed, March 2014; retired prior to assumption of post, September 2015.)
24	Thomas H. Copeman III		19 Jul 2012	Commander, Naval Surface Forces/Commander, Naval Surface Force, U.S. Pacific Fleet (COMNAVSURFOR/COMNAVSURFPAC), 2012–2014.	2	1982 (OCS)	30	(1959– )
25	Nanette M. DeRenzi		20 Jul 2012	Judge Advocate General, U.S. Navy/U.S. Department of Defense Representative for Ocean Policy Affairs (JAG/REPOPA), 2012–2015.	3	1984 (direct) (Note: Directly commissioned via the JAG Corps Student Program.)	28	(1960– ) Judge Advocate General's Corps. First female judge advocate in any service to achieve three-star rank.
*	Kurt W. Tidd		26 Jul 2012	Director, Operations, Joint Staff, J3, 2012–2013.; Assistant to the Chairman of the Joint Chiefs of Staff (ACJCS), 2013–2015.	3	1978 (USNA)	34	(1956– ) Promoted to admiral, 14 Jan 2016. Son of Navy vice admiral Emmett H. Tidd; brother of Navy rear admiral Mark L. Tidd.
26	Robin R. Braun		13 Aug 2012	Chief, U.S. Navy Reserve/Commander, Navy Reserve Force (CNR/CNRF), 2012–2016.	4	1980 (USNA)	32	(1958– ) First woman to lead any reserve component of the U.S. Armed Forces.
*	Michelle J. Howard		24 Aug 2012	Deputy Commander, U.S. Fleet Forces Command/Director, Combined Joint Operations from the Sea Center of Excellence (DCOMUSFF/DIRCJOS COE), 2012–2013.; Deputy Chief of Naval Operations, Operations, Plans and Strategy (DCNO N3/N5), 2013–2014.	2	1982 (USNA)	30	(1960– ) (Note: Served as Vice Chief of Naval Operations (VCNO).) Promoted to admiral, 1 Jul 2014. First African-American woman to achieve the rank of vice admiral in the Navy.
27	Michael J. Connor		7 Sep 2012	Commander, Submarine Forces/Commander, Submarine Force Atlantic/Commander, Allied Submarine Command/Commander, Task Force 144/Commander, Task Force 84 (COMSUBFOR/COMSUBLANT/COMASC/CTF-144/CTF-84), 2012–2015.	3	1980 (NROTC)	32	(1960– )
28	David A. Dunaway		21 Sep 2012	Commander, Naval Air Systems Command (COMNAVAIR), 2012–2015.	3	1982 (USNA)	30	(1960– )
29	Paul J. Bushong		Oct 2012	U.S. Security Coordinator for Israel and the Palestinian National Authority (USSC), 2012–2014.	2	1981 (USNA)	31	(1958– )
30	James D. Syring		19 Nov 2012	Director, Missile Defense Agency (DIRMDA), 2012–2017.	5	1985 (USNA)	27	(1963– )
31	Joseph P. Aucoin		5 Mar 2013	Deputy Chief of Naval Operations, Warfare Systems (DCNO N9), 2013–2015.; Commander, U.S. Seventh Fleet (COMSEVENTHFLT), 2015–2017.	4	1980 (NROTC)	33	(1957– ) Relieved, 2017.
32	Bruce E. Grooms		15 May 2013	Deputy Chief of Staff for Capability Development, Headquarters Supreme Allied Commander Transformation (DCOFS-CD), 2013–2015.	2	1980 (USNA)	33	(1958– )
33	Paul A. Grosklags		23 May 2013	Principal Military Deputy to the Assistant Secretary of the Navy (Research, Development, and Acquisition) (PMD ASN(RDA)), 2013–2015.; Commander, Naval Air Systems Command (COMNAVAIR), 2015–2018.	5	1982 (USNA)	31	(1960– )
34	Terry J. Benedict		28 May 2013	Director, Strategic Systems Programs (DIRSSP), 2010–2018.	5	1982 (USNA)	31	(1958– )
35	Kenneth E. Floyd		3 Jun 2013	Commander, U.S. Third Fleet (COMTHIRDFLT), 2013–2015.	2	1980 (NROTC)	33	(1958– )
36	William H. Hilarides		7 Jun 2013	Commander, Naval Sea Systems Command (COMNAVSEA), 2013–2016.	3	1981 (USNA)	32	(1959– )
37	Sean A. Pybus		2 Jul 2013	Commander, NATO Special Operations Headquarters (CDRNSHQ), 2013–2014.; Deputy Commander, U.S. Special Operations Command (DCDRUSSOCOM), 2014–2016.	3	1979 (NROTC)	34	(1957– ) Navy SEAL.
38	Nora W. Tyson		22 Jul 2013	Deputy Commander, U.S. Fleet Forces Command/Director, Combined Joint Operations from the Sea Center of Excellence (DCOMUSFF/DIRCJOS COE), 2013–2014.; Commander, U.S. Fleet Forces Command (COMUSFF), 2014.; Deputy Commander, U.S. Fleet Forces Command/Deputy Commander, U.S. Naval Forces Northern Command/Director, Combined Joint Operations from the Sea Center of Excellence (DCOMUSFF/DCOMUSNAVNORTH/DIRCJOS COE), 2014–2015.; Commander, U.S. Third Fleet (COMTHIRDFLT), 2015–2017.	4	1979 (OCS)	34	(1957– ) First woman to command a ship fleet.
39	Ted N. Branch		30 Jul 2013	Deputy Chief of Naval Operations, Information Warfare/Director of Naval Intelligence (DCNO N2/N6/DNI), 2013–2016.	3	1979 (USNA)	34	(1957– )
40	Robert L. Thomas Jr.		31 Jul 2013	Commander, U.S. Seventh Fleet (COMSEVENTHFLT), 2013–2015.; Director, Navy Staff (DNS), 2015–2016.	3	1979 (NROTC)	34	(1956– )
*	William F. Moran		2 Aug 2013	Deputy Chief of Naval Operations, Manpower, Personnel, Training and Education/Chief of Naval Personnel (DCNO N1/CNP), 2013–2016.	3	1981 (USNA)	32	(1958– ) Promoted to admiral, 31 May 2016.
*	James F. Caldwell Jr.		5 Sep 2013	Naval Inspector General (NAVIG), 2013–2015.	2	1981 (USNA)	32	(1959– ) Promoted to admiral, 14 Aug 2015. Great-grandson of Navy four-star admiral Jehu V. Chase.
41	Joseph W. Rixey		6 Sep 2013	Director, Defense Security Cooperation Agency (DIRDSCA), 2013–2017.	4	1983 (USNA)	30	(1960– )
42	William A. Brown		9 Oct 2013	Deputy Commander, U.S. Transportation Command (DCDRUSTRANSCOM), 2013–2015.; Commander, U.S. Transportation Command (CDRUSTRANSCOM), 2015.; Director, Logistics, Joint Staff, J4, 2015–2017.	4	1980 (VMI)	33	(1958– ) Supply Corps.
*	Philip S. Davidson		11 Oct 2013	Commander, U.S. Sixth Fleet/Commander, Naval Striking and Support Forces NATO/Deputy Commander, U.S. Naval Forces Europe/Deputy Commander, U.S. Naval Forces Africa/Joint Force Maritime Component Commander Europe (COMSIXTHFLT/COMSTRIKFORNATO/DCOMUS-NAVEUR/DCOMUSNAVAF/JFMCC Europe), 2013–2014.	1	1982 (USNA)	31	(1960– ) Promoted to admiral, 19 Dec 2014.
43	Joseph P. Mulloy		10 Jan 2014	Deputy Chief of Naval Operations, Integration of Capabilities and Resources (DCNO N8), 2014–2017.	3	1979 (USNA)	35	(1957– )
44	Jan E. Tighe		2 Apr 2014	Commander, U.S. Fleet Cyber Command/Commander, U.S. Tenth Fleet/Commander, Joint Force Headquarters – Cyber (Navy) (COMFCC/COMTENTHFLT/CDRJFHQ-C), 2014–2016.; Deputy Chief of Naval Operations, Information Warfare/Director of Naval Intelligence (DCNO N2/N6/DNI), 2016–2018.	4	1984 (USNA)	30	(1962– ) First woman to command a numbered fleet.
45	Walter E. Carter Jr.		23 Jul 2014	Superintendent, U.S. Naval Academy, 2014–2019.	5	1981 (USNA)	33	(1959– ) President, Naval War College, 2013–2014; President, University of Nebraska System, 2020–2024; President, Ohio State University, 2024–2026.
46	Thomas S. Rowden		7 Aug 2014	Commander, Naval Surface Forces/Commander, Naval Surface Force, U.S. Pacific Fleet (COMNAVSURFOR/COMNAVSURFPAC), 2014–2018.	4	1982 (USNA)	32	(1963– ) Resigned, 2018. Son of Navy vice admiral William H. Rowden.
47	Dixon R. Smith		24 Oct 2014	Commander, Navy Installations Command (CNIC), 2014–2017.; Deputy Chief of Naval Operations, Fleet Readiness and Logistics (DCNO N4), 2017–2019.	5	1983 (USNA)	31	(1960– )
*	James G. Foggo III		14 Dec 2014	Commander, U.S. Sixth Fleet/Commander, Task Force Six/Commander, Naval Striking and Support Forces NATO/Deputy Commander, U.S. Naval Forces Europe/Deputy Commander, U.S. Naval Forces Africa/Joint Force Maritime Component Commander Europe (COMSIXTHFLT/CTF-6/COMSTRIKFORNATO/DCOMUSNAVEUR/DCOMUSNAVAF/JFMCC Europe), 2014–2016.; Director, Navy Staff (DNS), 2016–2017.	3	1981 (USNA)	33	(1959– ) Promoted to admiral, 20 Oct 2017.
48	Troy M. Shoemaker		22 Jan 2015	Commander, Naval Air Forces/Commander, Naval Air Force, U.S. Pacific Fleet (COMNAVAIRFOR/COMNAVAIRPAC), 2015–2018.	3	1982 (USNA)	33	(1960– )
49	Herman A. Shelanski		15 May 2015	Naval Inspector General (NAVIG), 2015–2018.	3	1979 (AOCS)	36	(1957– )
50	Michael T. Franken		22 Jun 2015	Deputy to the Commander for Military Operations, U.S. Africa Command, 2015–2017.	2	1981 (NROTC)	34	(1957– ) Democratic Party nominee for U.S. Senator from Iowa, 2022.
51	James W. Crawford III		26 Jun 2015	Judge Advocate General, U.S. Navy/U.S. Department of Defense Representative for Ocean Policy Affairs (JAG/REPOPA), 2015–2018.	3	1983 (direct)	32	(1957– ) Judge Advocate General's Corps. President, Felician University, 2021–2023; President, Texas Southern University, 2024–present.
52	Kevin M. Donegan		3 Sep 2015	Commander, U.S. Naval Forces Central Command/Commander, U.S. Fifth Fleet/Commander, Combined Maritime Forces (COMUSNAVCENT/COMFIFTHFLT/COMCMF), 2015–2017.; Director, Navy Staff/Deputy Chief of Naval Operations, Operations, Plans and Strategy (DNS/DCNO N3/N5), 2017.; Director, Navy Staff (DNS), 2017–2018.	3	1980 (NROTC)	35	(1958– )
53	Richard P. Breckenridge		8 Sep 2015	Deputy Commander, U.S. Fleet Forces Command/Deputy Commander, U.S. Naval Forces Northern Command/Director, Combined Joint Operations from the Sea Center of Excellence (DCOMUSFF/DCOMUSNAVNORTH/DIRCJOS COE), 2015–2017.	2	1982 (USNA)	33	(1960– )
54	Joseph E. Tofalo		11 Sep 2015	Commander, Submarine Forces/Commander, Submarine Force Atlantic/Commander, Allied Submarine Command/Commander, Task Force 144/Commander, Task Force 84 (COMSUBFOR/COMSUBLANT/COMASC/CTF-144/CTF-84), 2015–2018.	3	1983 (USNA)	32	(1962– )
55	John N. Christenson		Oct 2015	U.S. Military Representative, NATO Military Committee (USMILREP), 2015–2018.	3	1981 (USNA)	34	(1958– ) President, Naval War College, 2011–2013.
56	David C. Johnson		Oct 2015	Principal Military Deputy to the Assistant Secretary of the Navy (Research, Development, and Acquisition) (PMD ASN(RDA)), 2015–2018.	3	1982 (USNA)	33	(1960– )
*	John C. Aquilino		13 Oct 2015	Deputy Chief of Naval Operations, Operations, Plans and Strategy (DCNO N3/N5), 2015–2017.; Commander, U.S. Naval Forces Central Command/Commander, U.S. Fifth Fleet/Commander, Combined Maritime Forces (COMUSNAVCENT/COMFIFTHFLT/COMCMF), 2017–2018.	3	1984 (USNA)	31	(1961– ) Promoted to admiral, 17 May 2018.
57	Raquel C. Bono		29 Oct 2015	Director, Defense Health Agency (DIRDHA), 2015–2019.	4	1979 (NROTC)	36	(1957– ) Medical Corps. First Asian-American woman and female Navy medical officer to achieve the rank of vice admiral.
58	C. Forrest Faison III		25 Dec 2015	Surgeon General, U.S. Navy/Chief, Bureau of Medicine and Surgery (SGN/BUMED), 2015–2019.	4	1980 (direct)	35	(1958– ) Medical Corps.
*	Robert P. Burke		27 May 2016	Deputy Chief of Naval Operations, Manpower, Personnel, Training and Education/Chief of Naval Personnel (DCNO N1/CNP), 2016–2019.	3	1983 (NROTC)	33	(1962– ) Promoted to admiral, 10 Jun 2019.
59	Thomas J. Moore		10 Jun 2016	Commander, Naval Sea Systems Command (COMNAVSEA), 2016–2020.	4	1981 (USNA)	35	(1959– )
60	Kevin D. Scott		Jul 2016	Director, Joint Force Development, Joint Staff, J7, 2016–2018.	2	1982 (NROTC)	34	(1960– )
*	Michael M. Gilday		14 Jul 2016	Commander, U.S. Fleet Cyber Command/Commander, U.S. Tenth Fleet/Commander, Joint Force Headquarters – Cyber (Navy) (COMFCC/COMTENTHFLT/CDRJFHQ-C), 2016–2018.; Director, Operations, Joint Staff, J3, 2018–2019.; Director, Joint Staff (DJS), 2019.	3	1985 (USNA)	31	(1962– ) Promoted to admiral, 22 Aug 2019.
61	Colin J. Kilrain		15 Jul 2016	Commander, NATO Special Operations Headquarters (CDRNSHQ), 2016–2019.; Associate Director, Military Affairs, Central Intelligence Agency (ADMA), 2019–2021.; Assistant to the Chairman of the Joint Chiefs of Staff (ACJCS), 2021–2023.	7	1985 (OCS)	31	(1958– ) Navy SEAL.
62	Luke M. McCollum		28 Sep 2016	Chief, U.S. Navy Reserve/Commander, Navy Reserve Force (CNR/CNRF), 2016–2020.	4	1983 (USNA)	33	(1960– )
63	P. Gardner Howe III		4 Oct 2016	Associate Director, Military Affairs, Central Intelligence Agency (ADMA), 2016–2019.	3	1982 (USNA)	34	(1962– ) Navy SEAL. President, Naval War College, 2014–2016.
*	Charles A. Richard		18 Oct 2016	Deputy Commander, U.S. Strategic Command (DCDRUSSTRATCOM), 2016–2018.; Commander, Submarine Forces/Commander, Submarine Force Atlantic/Commander, Allied Submarine Command/Commander, Task Force 144/Commander, Task Force 84 (COMSUBFOR/COMSUBLANT/COMASC/CTF-144/CTF-84), 2018–2019.	3	1982 (NROTC)	34	(1959– ) Promoted to admiral, 18 Nov 2019.
*	Christopher W. Grady		28 Oct 2016	Commander, U.S. Sixth Fleet/Commander, Naval Striking and Support Forces NATO/Deputy Commander, U.S. Naval Forces Europe – Naval Forces Africa/Joint Force Maritime Component Commander Europe (COMSIXTHFLT/COMSTRIKFORNATO/DCOMUSNAVEUR-NAVAF/JFMCC Europe), 2016–2018.; Assistant to the Chairman of the Joint Chiefs of Staff (ACJCS), 2018.	2	1984 (NROTC)	32	(1962– ) (Note: Served as Vice Chairman, Joint Chiefs of Staff (VJCS).) Promoted to admiral, 4 May 2018.
64	Mary M. Jackson		31 Mar 2017	Commander, Navy Installations Command (CNIC), 2017–2020.	3	1988 (USNA)	29	(1966– )
*	William K. Lescher		5 Apr 2017	Deputy Chief of Naval Operations, Integration of Capabilities and Resources (DCNO N8), 2017–2020.	3	1980 (USNA)	37	(1958– ) Promoted to admiral, 29 May 2020.
65	David H. Lewis		24 May 2017	Director, Defense Contract Management Agency (DIRDCMA), 2017–2020.	3	1979 (NROTC)	38	(1957– )
66	Mathias W. Winter		25 May 2017	Program Executive Officer, F-35 Lightning II Joint Program Office (PEO F-35), 2017–2019.	2	1984 (NROTC)	33	(1962– )
67	Matthew J. Kohler		6 Jul 2017	Commander, Naval Information Forces (COMNAVIFOR), 2016–2018.; Deputy Chief of Naval Operations, Information Warfare/Director of Naval Intelligence (DCNO N2/N6/DNI), 2018–2020.	3	1983 (AOCS)	34	(1960– )
68	William R. Merz		31 Jul 2017	Deputy Chief of Naval Operations, Warfare Systems (DCNO N9), 2017–2019.; Commander, U.S. Seventh Fleet (COMSEVENTHFLT), 2019–2021.; Deputy Chief of Naval Operations, Operations, Plans and Strategy (DCNO N3/N5), 2021–2022.	5	1986 (USNA)	31	(1963– )
69	Andrew L. Lewis		16 Aug 2017	Deputy Chief of Naval Operations, Operations, Plans and Strategy (DCNO N3/N5), 2017–2018.; Commander, U.S. Second Fleet (COMSECONDFLT), 2018.; Commander, U.S. Second Fleet/Commander, Joint Force Command - Norfolk (COMSECONDFLT/CDRJFC-NF), 2018–2020.; Commander, U.S. Second Fleet/Commander, Joint Force Command - Norfolk/Director, Combined Joint Operations from the Sea Center of Excellence (COMSECONDFLT/CDRJFC-NF/DIRCJOS COE), 2020–2021.	4	1985 (USNA)	32	(1963– )
70	Phillip G. Sawyer		23 Aug 2017	Commander, U.S. Seventh Fleet (COMSEVENTHFLT), 2017–2019.; Deputy Chief of Naval Operations, Operations, Plans and Strategy (DCNO N3/N5), 2019–2021.	4	1983 (USNA)	34	(1961– )
71	John D. Alexander		15 Sep 2017	Commander, U.S. Third Fleet (COMTHIRDFLT), 2017–2019.	2	1982 (AOCS)	35	(1956– )
72	Frederick J. Roegge		25 Sep 2017	President, National Defense University (NDU-P), 2017–2021.	4	1980 (NROTC)	37	(1958– )
73	Bruce H. Lindsey		7 Nov 2017	Deputy Commander, U.S. Fleet Forces Command/Deputy Commander, U.S. Naval Forces Northern Command/Director, Combined Joint Operations from the Sea Center of Excellence (DCOMUSFF/DCOMUSNAVNORTH/CDIRCJOS COE), 2017–2019.; Deputy Commander, U.S. Fleet Forces Command/Deputy Commander, U.S. Naval Forces Northern Command/Deputy Commander, U.S. Naval Forces Strategic Command/Director, Combined Joint Operations from the Sea Center of Excellence (DCOMUSFF/DCOMUSNAVNORTH/DCOMUSNAVSTRAT/DIRCJOS COE), 2019–2020.	3	1982 (USNA)	35	(1960– )
74	Richard A. Brown		8 Jan 2018	Commander, Naval Surface Forces/Commander, Naval Surface Force, U.S. Pacific Fleet (COMNAVSURFOR/COMNAVSURFPAC), 2018–2020.	2	1985 (USNA)	33	(1963– )
75	DeWolfe H. Miller III		11 Jan 2018	Commander, Naval Air Forces/Commander, Naval Air Force, U.S. Pacific Fleet (COMNAVAIRFOR/COMNAVAIRPAC), 2018–2020.	2	1981 (USNA)	37	(1959– )
76	Nancy A. Norton		1 Feb 2018	Director, Defense Information Systems Agency/Commander, Joint Force Headquarters – Department of Defense Information Network (DIRDISA/CDRJFHQ-DoDIN), 2018–2021.	3	1987 (NROTC)	31	(1964– )
*	Lisa M. Franchetti		1 Mar 2018	Commander, U.S. Sixth Fleet/Commander, Task Force Six/Commander, Naval Striking and Support Forces NATO/Deputy Commander, U.S. Naval Forces Europe-Africa/Joint Force Maritime Component Commander Europe (COMSIXTHFLT/CTF-6/COMSTRIKFORNATO/DCOMCNE-CNA/JFMCC Europe), 2018–2020.; Deputy Chief of Naval Operations, Warfighting Development (DCNO N7), 2020.; Director, Strategy, Plans and Policy, Joint Staff, J5/Senior Member, U.S. Delegation to the U.N. Military Staff Committee (Sr. Member MSC), 2020–2022.	4	1985 (NROTC)	33	(1964– ) Promoted to admiral, 2 Sep 2022.
*	Craig S. Faller		Apr 2018	Senior Military Assistant to the Secretary of Defense (SMA SecDef), 2017–2018.	0	1983 (USNA)	35	(1961– ) Promoted to admiral, 26 Nov 2018.
79	Johnny R. Wolfe Jr.		4 May 2018	Director, Strategic Systems Programs (DIRSSP), 2018–present.	6	1988 (USNA)	30	(1965– )
80	Scott A. Stearney		6 May 2018	Commander, U.S. Naval Forces Central Command/Commander, U.S. Fifth Fleet/Commander, Combined Maritime Forces (COMUSNAVCENT/COMFIFTHFLT/COMCMF), 2018.	0	1982 (AOCS)	31	(1960–2018) Died in office.
81	G. Dean Peters		31 May 2018	Commander, Naval Air Systems Command (COMNAVAIR), 2018–2021.	3	1985 (USNA)	33	(1963– )
82	Brian B. Brown		15 Jun 2018	Commander, Naval Information Forces (COMNAVIFOR), 2018–2021.	3	1986 (USNA)	32	(1964– )
83	David M. Kriete		15 Jun 2018	Deputy Commander, U.S. Strategic Command (DCDRUSSTRATCOM), 2018–2020.; Deputy Commander, U.S. Fleet Forces Command/Deputy Commander, U.S. Naval Forces Northern Command/Deputy Commander, U.S. Naval Forces Strategic Command/Commander, Task Force 80/Director, Combined Joint Operations from the Sea Center of Excellence (DCOMUSFF/DCOMUSNAVNORTH/DCOMUSNAVSTRAT/CTF-80/DIRCJOS COE), 2020.; Deputy Commander, U.S. Fleet Forces Command/Deputy Commander, U.S. Naval Forces Northern Command/Deputy Commander, U.S. Naval Forces Strategic Command/Commander, Task Force 80 (DCOMUSFF/DCOMUSNAVNORTH/DCOMUSNAVSTRAT/CTF-80), 2020–2021.	3	1984 (USNA)	34	(1963– )
84	Timothy J. White		18 Jun 2018	Commander, U.S. Fleet Cyber Command/Commander, U.S. Tenth Fleet/Commander, Joint Force Headquarters – Cyber (Navy) (COMFCC/COMTENTHFLT/CDRJFHQ-C), 2018–2020.	2	1987 (USNA)	31	(1965– )
85	James J. Malloy		31 Jul 2018	Commander, U.S. Naval Forces Central Command/Commander, U.S. Fifth Fleet/Commander, Combined Maritime Forces (COMUSNAVCENT/COMFIFTHFLT/COMCMF), 2018–2020.; Deputy Commander, U.S. Central Command (DCDRUSCENTCOM), 2020–2022.	4	1986 (USNA)	32	(1963– )
86	Richard P. Snyder		31 Jul 2018	Naval Inspector General (NAVIG), 2018–2021.	3	1983 (NROTC)	35	(1960– )
87	John G. Hannink		12 Sep 2018	Judge Advocate General, U.S. Navy/U.S. Department of Defense Representative for Ocean Policy Affairs (JAG/REPOPA), 2018–2021.	3	1985 (USNA)	33	(1962– ) Judge Advocate General's Corps.
88	Michael T. Moran		12 Oct 2018	Principal Military Deputy to the Assistant Secretary of the Navy (Research, Development, and Acquisition) (PMD ASN(RDA)), 2018–2021.	3	1984 (USNA)	34	(1962– )
89	Timothy G. Szymanski		15 Oct 2018	Deputy Commander, U.S. Special Operations Command (DCDRUSSOCOM), 2018–2021.	3	1985 (USNA)	33	(1962– ) Navy SEAL.
90	Michael J. Dumont		5 Nov 2018	Deputy Commander, U.S. Northern Command/Vice Commander, U.S. Element, North American Aerospace Defense Command (DCDRUSNORTHCOM/VCDRNORAD), 2018–2021.	3	1990 (USA)	28	(1960– ) (Note: Transferred to U.S. Navy Reserve from U.S. Army, 1990.)
91	Robert D. Sharp		7 Feb 2019	Director, National Geospatial-Intelligence Agency (DIRNGA), 2019–2022.	3	1988 (OCS)	31	
*	Stuart B. Munsch		28 Mar 2019	Deputy Chief of Naval Operations, Warfighting Development (DCNO N7), 2019–2020.; Director, Joint Force Development, Joint Staff, J7, 2020–2022.	3	1985 (USNA)	34	(1962– ) Promoted to admiral, 27 Jun 2022.
92	Ross A. Myers		24 May 2019	Deputy Commander, U.S. Cyber Command (DCDRUSCYBERCOM), 2019–2020.; Commander, U.S. Fleet Cyber Command/Commander, U.S. Tenth Fleet/Commander, Joint Force Headquarters – Cyber (Navy) (COMFCC/COMTENTHFLT/CDRJFHQ-C), 2020–2022.	3	1986 (NROTC)	33	(1959– )
93	John B. Nowell Jr.		24 May 2019	Deputy Chief of Naval Operations, Manpower, Personnel, Training and Education/Chief of Naval Personnel (DCNO N1/CNP), 2019–2022.	3	1984 (USNA)	35	(1962– )
94	Jon A. Hill		31 May 2019	Director, Missile Defense Agency (DIRMDA), 2019–2023.	4	1985 (NROTC)	34	(1963– )
95	Ronald A. Boxall		7 Jun 2019	Director, Force Structure, Resources and Assessment, Joint Staff, J8, 2019–2022.	3	1984 (NROTC)	35	(1963– )
96	Ricky L. Williamson		27 Jun 2019	Deputy Chief of Naval Operations, Fleet Readiness and Logistics (DCNO N4), 2019–2023.	4	1985 (USNA)	34	(1962– )
97	Dee L. Mewbourne		2 Jul 2019	Deputy Commander, U.S. Transportation Command (DCDRUSTRANSCOM), 2019–2022.	3	1982 (USNA)	37	(1961– )
*	James W. Kilby		23 Jul 2019	Deputy Chief of Naval Operations, Warfighting Requirements and Capabilities (DCNO N9), 2019–2021.; Deputy Commander, U.S. Fleet Forces Command/Deputy Commander, U.S. Naval Forces Northern Command/Deputy Commander, U.S. Naval Forces Strategic Command/Commander, Task Force 80 (DCOMUSFF/DCOMUSNAVNORTH/DCOMUSNAVSTRAT/CTF-80), 2021–2024.	5	1986 (USNA)	33	(1963– ) Promoted to admiral, 5 Jan 2024.
98	Sean S. Buck		26 Jul 2019	Superintendent, U.S. Naval Academy, 2019–2023.	4	1983 (USNA)	36	(1960– )
99	Scott D. Conn		27 Sep 2019	Commander, U.S. Third Fleet (COMTHIRDFLT), 2019–2021.; Deputy Chief of Naval Operations, Warfighting Requirements and Capabilities (DCNO N9), 2021–2023.	4	1985 (NROTC)	34	(1962– )
*	Daryl L. Caudle		12 Nov 2019	Commander, Submarine Forces/Commander, Submarine Force Atlantic/Commander, Allied Submarine Command/Commander, Task Force 144/Commander, Task Force 84 (COMSUBFOR/COMSUBLANT/COMASC/CTF-144/CTF-84), 2019–2021.	2	1985 (OCS)	34	(1963– ) Promoted to admiral, 7 Dec 2021.

== Background ==
=== Three-star positions, elevations and reductions ===
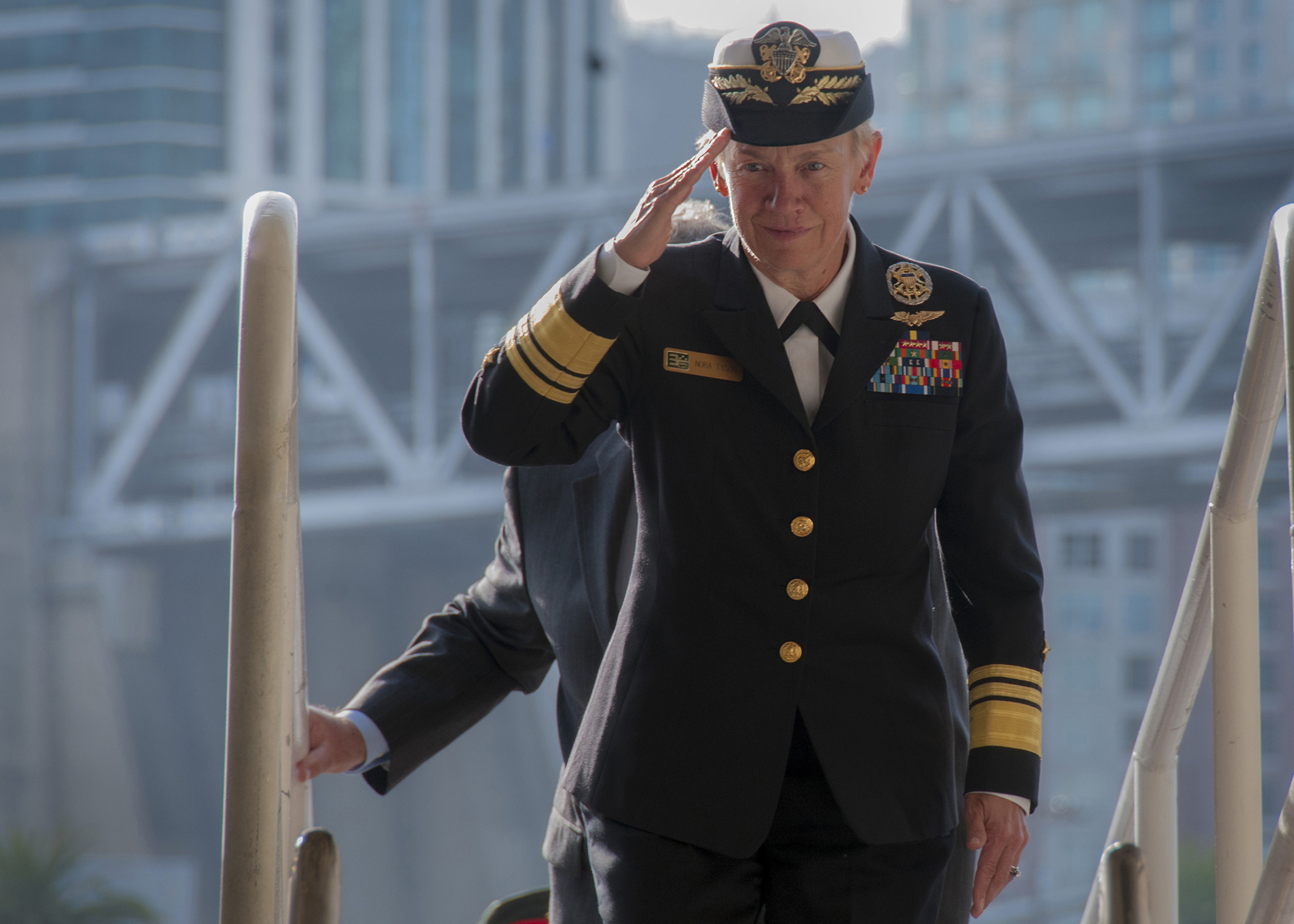
Vice Adm. Nora W. Tyson, commander, U.S. Third Fleet, arrives at an San Francisco Fleet Week event aboard USS Somerset (LPD-25), October 7, 2015.

Several three-star positions were created, consolidated, or even eliminated entirely between 2010 and 2019.

- The warfighting development (OPNAV N7) directorate was stood up in October 2019 to develop and disseminate naval strategy and implement it in tandem with naval training and education efforts. Rear Admiral Stuart B. Munsch was promoted to vice admiral to become the first deputy chief of naval operations for warfighting development.

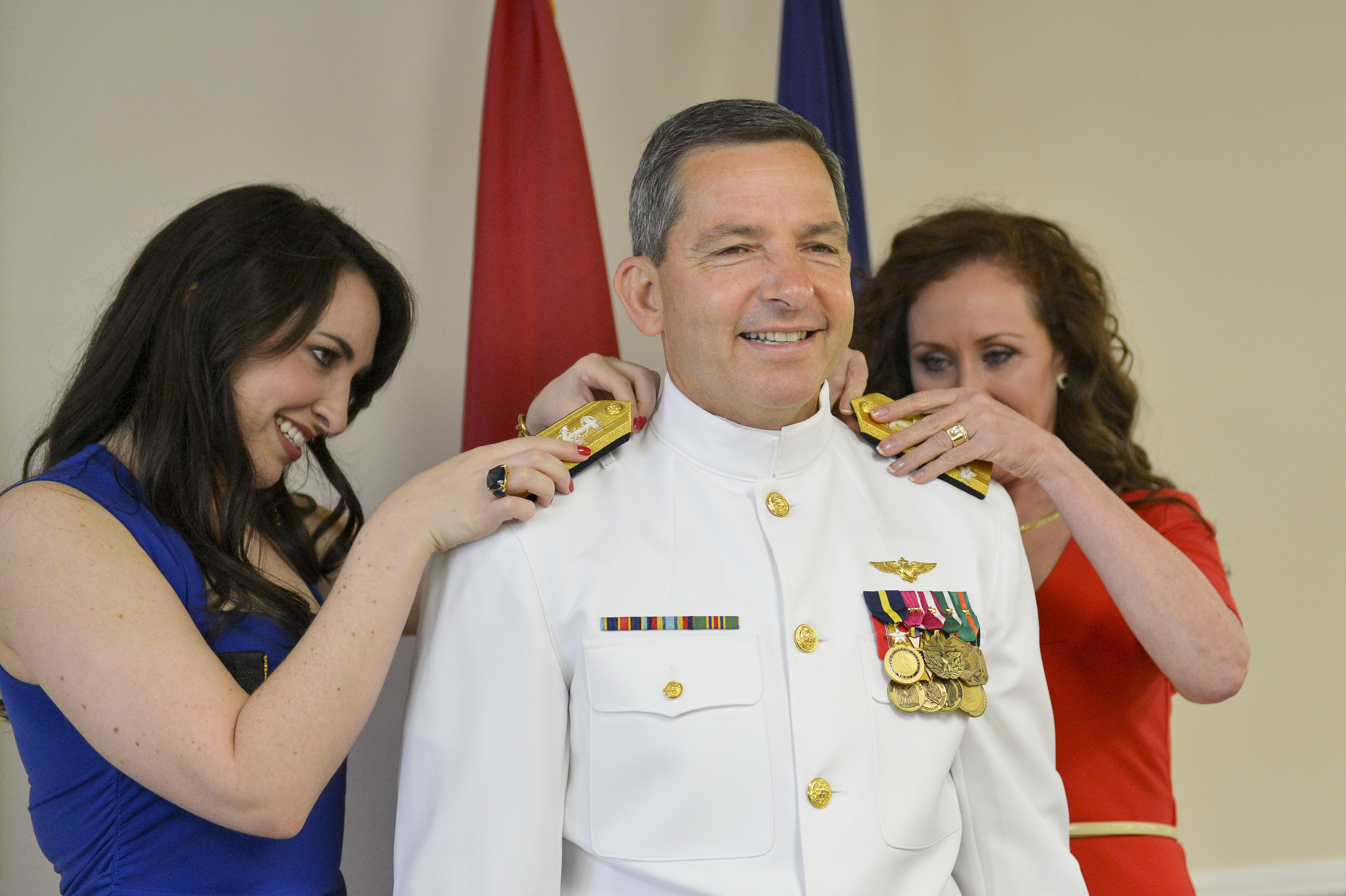
Vice Adm. David Dunaway is pinned with three-star shoulder boards by his wife and daughter on 20 September 2012.

- The warfare systems (OPNAV N9) directorate was stood up in 2012 for validating and integrating requirements and resources for manpower, training, sustainment safety and modernization of manned and unmanned warfare systems of the U.S. Navy, with Vice Admiral William R. Burke as its inaugural commander.
- The surgeon general of the Navy (SGN), a vice admiral's billet since 1965 was reduced to a rear admiral's billet after the 2017 National Defense Authorization Act struck the statutory ranks of heads of restricted/limited-duty communities. Rear Admiral Bruce L. Gillingham, the first Navy surgeon general since passage of the Act, assumed office on 1 October 2019.
- Naval Information Forces (NAVIFOR), established in 2014 as a two-star command was elevated to a three-star command in July 2017. Then-NAVIFOR commander, Rear Admiral Matthew J. Kohler was promoted to vice admiral on 6 July 2017.
- United States Second Fleet (COMSECONDFLT) was disestablished and re-established in 2011 and 2018.
  - In September 2011, Second Fleet was disestablished and merged with the U.S. Fleet Forces Command as a cost-saving measure. COMSECONDFLT's directorship of the Combined Joint Operations from the Sea Center of Excellence (CJOS COE), held since 2006, was transferred to the deputy commander of U.S. Fleet Forces Command.
  - Facing maritime competition from Russia, Second Fleet was formally re-established on 24 August 2018 as a strategic countermeasure. Its new commander, Vice Admiral Andrew L. Lewis was dual-hatted as Joint Force Command - Norfolk (JFC-NF) from June 2018, and re-assumed the directorship of CJOS COE in October 2020.

=== Senate confirmations ===
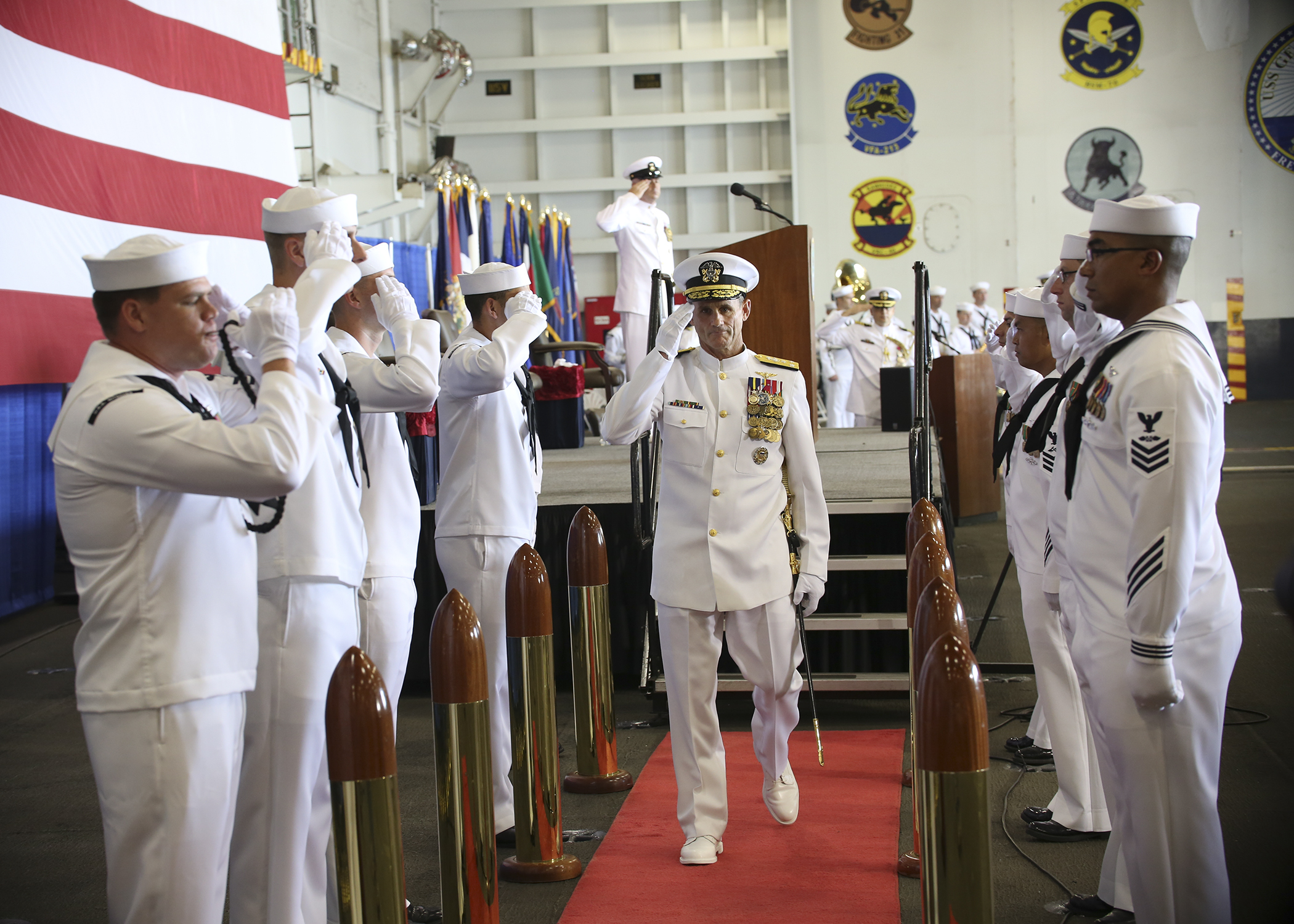
Vice Adm. Andrew L. Lewis salutes sideboys as he departs the U.S. Second Fleet change of command ceremony aboard USS George H.W. Bush (CVN-77) on 24 August 2018.

Military nominations are considered by the Senate Armed Services Committee. While it is rare for three-star or four-star nominations to face even token opposition in the Senate, nominations that do face opposition due to controversy surrounding the nominee in question are typically withdrawn. Nominations that are not withdrawn are allowed to expire without action at the end of the legislative session.

- For example, the nomination of Rear Admiral Elizabeth L. Train for promotion to vice admiral and assignment as director of naval intelligence and deputy chief of naval operations for information warfare was withdrawn in April 2016 in favour of Vice Admiral Jan E. Tighe, then-commander of U.S. Fleet Cyber Command and Tenth Fleet. Tighe was confirmed in May 2016 and assumed office in July 2016.
- The nomination of Major General Ryan F. Gonsalves for promotion to lieutenant general and assignment as commanding general of U.S. Army Europe was withdrawn in November 2017 after an investigation was launched into the general's inappropriate comment to a female Congressional staffer. As a result, Gonsalves was administratively reprimanded and retired in May 2018.

Additionally, events that take place after Senate confirmation may still delay or even prevent the nominee from assuming office.

- For example, Major General John G. Rossi, who had been confirmed for promotion to lieutenant general and assignment as the commanding general of the U.S. Army Space and Missile Defense Command in April 2016 committed suicide two days before his scheduled promotion and assumption of command. As a result, the then incumbent commander of USASMDC, Lieutenant General David L. Mann, remained in command beyond customary term limits until another nominee, Major General James H. Dickinson was confirmed by the Senate.
- Vice Admiral Scott A. Stearney assumed command of U.S. Naval Forces Central Command, Fifth Fleet, and Combined Maritime Forces in May 2018. His death in December of the same year resulted in the speedy confirmation of Rear Admiral James J. Malloy in the same month for appointment to three-star rank as his replacement.

== Legislative history ==
The following list of Congressional legislation includes all acts of Congress pertaining to appointments to the grade of vice admiral in the United States Navy from 2010 to 2019. (Note: Legislative history compiled from the U.S. Congress official website and U.S. Government Publishing Office official website.)

Each entry lists an act of Congress, its citation in the United States Statutes at Large or Public Law number, and a summary of the act's relevance, with officers affected by the act bracketed where applicable. Positions listed without reference to rank are assumed to be eligible for officers of three-star grade or higher.

List of legislation on appointments of vice admirals from 2010 to 2019
Legislation	Citation	Summary
Act of 7 January 2011 [Ike Skelton National Defense Authorization Act for Fiscal Year 2011]	124 Stat. 4137	Authorized officers frocked to grade of vice admiral or admiral to wear the insignia of that grade for up to 14 days before assuming position for which that grade is authorized.; Repealed 30-day waiting period following congressional notification before officers below grade of lieutenant general or vice admiral may wear insignia of the next higher grade.
Act of 23 December 2016 [National Defense Authorization Act for Fiscal Year 2017]	130 Stat. 2000	Repealed authorization for the Chief of Staff to the President, if a general or flag officer of the United States Armed Forces, to be designated a position of importance and responsibility with grade of lieutenant general or vice admiral.; Removed statutory requirement for the director of the Department of Defense Test Resource Management Center, if a commissioned officer, to hold grade of lieutenant general or vice admiral.; Repealed statutory requirement for the director of the Missile Defense Agency, if a commissioned officer, to hold grade of lieutenant general or vice admiral.; Repealed statutory requirement for senior members of the United Nations Military Staff Committee to hold grade of lieutenant general or vice admiral.; Repealed statutory requirement for the principal military deputy to the assistant secretary of the Navy (research, development and acquisition) to hold grade of lieutenant general in the Marine Corps or vice admiral in the Navy.; Repealed statutory requirement for the judge advocate general of the Navy to hold grade of vice admiral.
Act of 12 December 2019 [National Defense Authorization Act for Fiscal Year 2020]	133 Stat. 1346	Required advice and consent of the Senate on any proposal by the secretary of defense to increase the retired grade of any military officer through the reopening of the determination or certification of said officer's retired grade.

== See also ==
- List of active duty United States four-star officers
- List of active duty United States three-star officers
- List of United States Navy vice admirals on active duty before 1960
- List of United States Navy vice admirals from 2000 to 2009
- List of United States Navy vice admirals since 2020
- List of United States Coast Guard vice admirals
- List of United States Public Health Service Commissioned Corps vice admirals
- List of United States military leaders by rank
- List of United States Navy four-star admirals
- Vice admiral (United States)

== Bibliography ==
- Register of Commissioned and Warrant Officers of the United States Navy on Active Duty, Washington, D.C.: Bureau of Naval Personnel, 1 October 1990
- United States Navy Flag Officers (Public), March 2021 (PDF), Washington, D.C.: MyNavyHR, March 2021, archived from the original (PDF) on 18 May 2021
- United States Navy Flag Officers (Public), April 2021 (PDF), Washington, D.C.: MyNavyHR, April 2021, archived from the original (PDF) on 17 April 2021
- United States Navy Flag Officers (Public), May 2021 (PDF), Washington, D.C.: MyNavyHR, May 2021, archived from the original (PDF) on 18 May 2021
- United States Navy Flag Officers (Public), June 2021 (PDF), Washington, D.C.: MyNavyHR, June 2021, archived from the original (PDF) on 3 June 2021
- United States Navy Flag Officers (Public), July 2021 (PDF), Washington, D.C.: MyNavyHR, July 2021, archived from the original (PDF) on 9 July 2021
- United States Navy Flag Officers (Public), August 2021 (PDF), Washington, D.C.: MyNavyHR, August 2021, archived from the original (PDF) on 6 August 2021
- United States Navy Flag Officers (Public), September 2021 (PDF), Washington, D.C.: MyNavyHR, September 2021, archived from the original (PDF) on 1 September 2021
- United States Navy Flag Officers (Public), October 2021 (PDF), Washington, D.C.: MyNavyHR, October 2021, archived from the original (PDF) on 1 October 2021
- United States Navy Flag Officers (Public), November 2021 (PDF), Washington, D.C.: MyNavyHR, November 2021, archived from the original (PDF) on 2 November 2021
- United States Navy Flag Officers (Public), January 2022 (PDF), Washington, D.C.: MyNavyHR, January 2022, archived from the original (PDF) on 4 July 2022
- United States Navy Flag Officers (Public), February 2022 (PDF), Washington, D.C.: MyNavyHR, February 2022, archived from the original (PDF) on 4 February 2022
- United States Navy Flag Officers (Public), March 2022 (PDF), Washington, D.C.: MyNavyHR, March 2022, archived from the original (PDF) on 2 March 2022
- United States Navy Flag Officers (Public), April 2022 (PDF), Washington, D.C.: MyNavyHR, April 2022, archived from the original (PDF) on 2 April 2022
- United States Navy Flag Officers (Public), May 2022 (PDF), Washington, D.C.: MyNavyHR, May 2022, archived from the original (PDF) on 30 April 2022
- United States Navy Flag Officers (Public), June 2022 (PDF), Washington, D.C.: MyNavyHR, June 2022, archived from the original (PDF) on 1 June 2022
- United States Navy Flag Officers (Public), July 2022 (PDF), Washington, D.C.: MyNavyHR, July 2022, archived from the original (PDF) on 5 July 2022
- United States Navy Flag Officers (Public), August 2022 (PDF), Washington, D.C.: MyNavyHR, August 2022, archived from the original (PDF) on 2 August 2022
