= Bette Bolivar =

Retired U.S. Navy admiral

Babette R. Bolivar
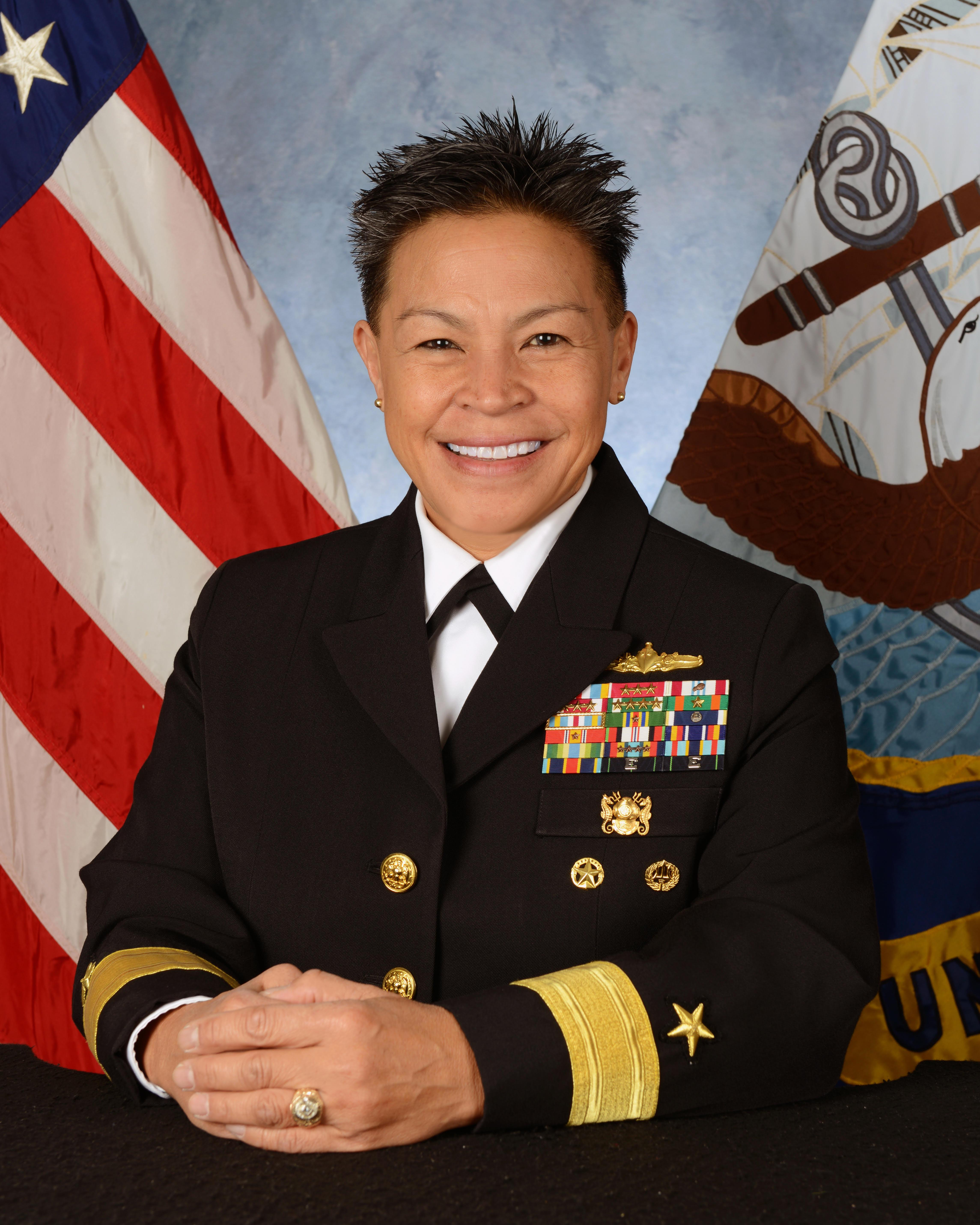
- Born: 1962 (age 63–64); Hawaii, U.S.
- Education: United States Naval Academy (BS); Troy State University (MS)
- Military career
- Allegiance: United States
- Branch: United States Navy
- Service years: 1985–2021
- Rank: Rear Admiral (lower half)
- Nickname: Bette
- Commands: Navy Region Southwest; Navy Region Southeast; Joint Region Marianas/Task Force West; Navy Region Northwest; Naval Weapons Station Yorktown; USS Salvor (ARS-52)
- Awards: Defense Superior Service Medal; Legion of Merit (4)

Babette Rose Bolivar (born 1962) is a retired United States Navy rear admiral who last served as the commander of Navy Region Southwest (nicknamed "The Navy Mayor of San Diego") from March 14, 2019, to July 16, 2021. She was the second woman and first Filipino-American to command the navy region, which covers California, Nevada, Utah, Arizona, Colorado, and New Mexico.

She previously served as the 42nd commander of Navy Region Southeast from February 2017 to February 2019, with tours as commander of Navy Joint Region Marianas and Task Force West, dual-hatted as PACOM representative to Guam from August 2014 to January 2017, commander of Navy Region Northwest from June 2013 to July 2014, commanding officer of Naval Weapons Station Yorktown from August 2007 to June 2010 and commanding officer of USS Salvor (ARS-52) in the 1990s. She was promoted to her latest rank on March 1, 2014.

She retired from active duty in 2021 after relinquishing command of Navy Region Southwest to Stephen D. Barnett.

== Early life and education ==
A native of Hawaii, Bolivar was raised by traditional Filipino-American parents, retired U.S. Navy sailor Ted Sereno Bolivar from Nabua, Camarines Sur, and Virginia Dolor Bolivar from Pangasinan. She received her commission from the United States Naval Academy where she received a B.S. degree in oceanography in 1985. She also has an M.S. degree in management from Troy University.

== Service ==
In 2017, Bolivar was officially reprimanded by then-commander of the United States Indo-Pacific Command, Admiral Philip S. Davidson for three of five substantiated allegations against her in relation to the Fat Leonard scandal which took place during her command of the USS Salvor in 1998. Davidson's letter of reprimand determined that Bolivar had wrongly accepted gifts in the form of "a free hotel room, dinner, drinks, entertainment and a golf excursion" from Leonard Glenn Francis, owner of Glenn Defense Marine Asia. However, it was also argued that she hadn't willingly accepted the gifts or was aware of Fat Leonard's criminal activities, and Davidson instead considered the matter closed. No further action was taken against her.

In 2019, Chief of Naval Operations John M. Richardson unexpectedly stripped Bolivar of her authority to preside over two SEAL-related court-martial cases, namely those of Jacob X. Portier and Eddie Gallagher. This was in response to a letter by Bolivar to Gallagher's civilian defense attorney, Timothy Parlatore, requesting that a harsher punishment be meted out to the Navy SEAL, suggesting that factors such as witness intimidation, interference with the administration of justice, the effect of deferment on the good order and discipline on the command and Gallagher's character could be considered, and that Parlatore's plea “fails to satisfy” those concerns". In essence, this was a show of support for a harsher punishment for Gallagher in opposition to what was supported by the military jury of his peers.

Military offices
Preceded by ???	Commanding Officer of Naval Weapons Station Yorktown; 2007-2010	Succeeded by Charles B. Marks III
Preceded by Markham K. Rich	Commander of Navy Region Northwest; 2013-2014	Succeeded by Jeffrey S. Rich
Preceded by Tilghman D. Payne	Commander of Joint Region Marianas and United States Naval Forces Marianas; 2014-2017	Succeeded by Shoshana S. Chatfield
Preceded by Mary M. Jackson	Commander of Navy Region Southeast; 2017-2019	Succeeded by Gary A. Mayes
Preceded by Yancy B. Lindsey	Commander of Navy Region Southwest; 2019-2021	Succeeded by Stephen D. Barnett
