= Yancy Lindsey =

U.S. Navy admiral

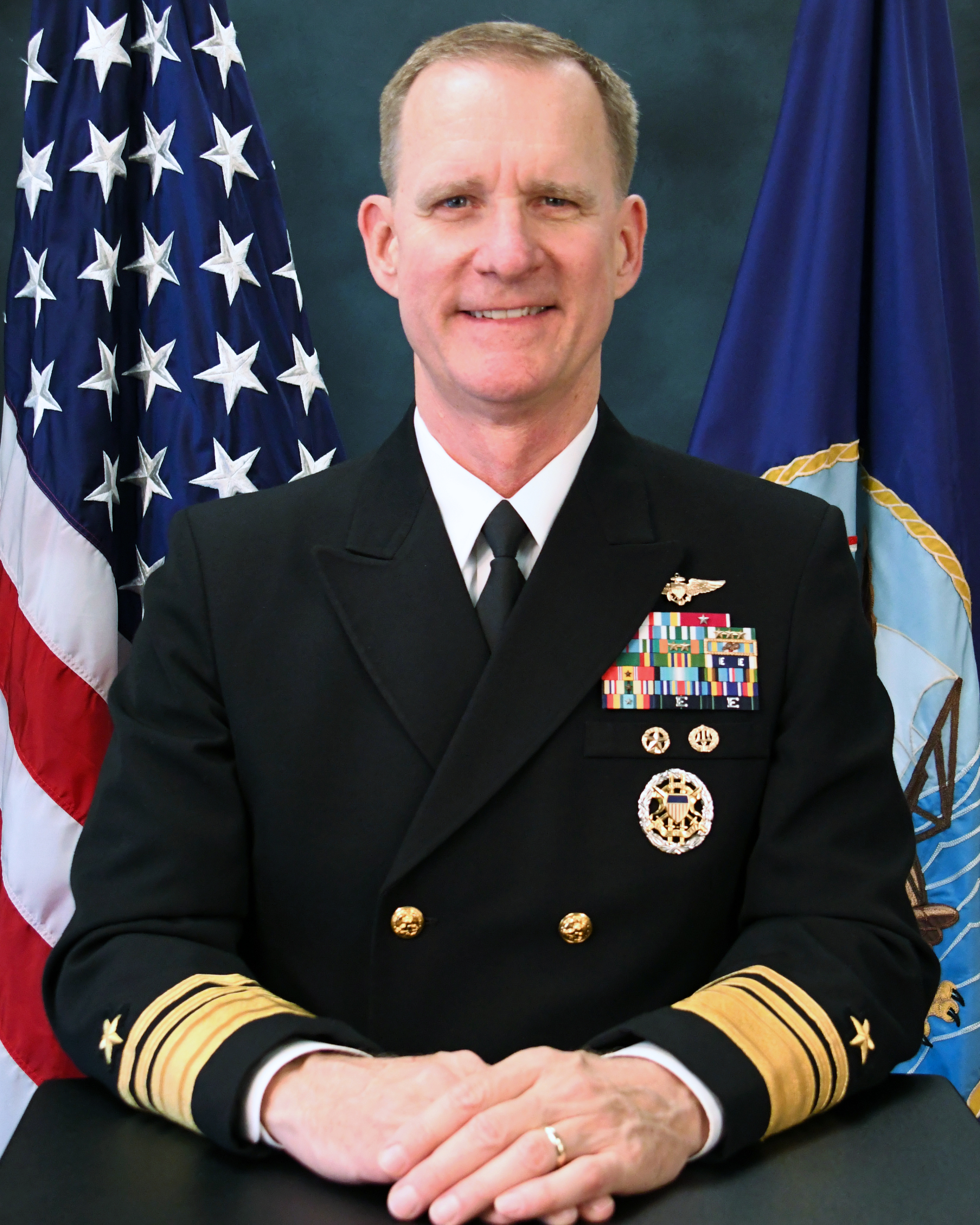
- Born: 1962 (age 63–64); Phoenix, Arizona, U.S.
- Military career
- Allegiance: United States
- Branch: United States Navy
- Service years: 1986–2023
- Rank: Vice Admiral
- Nickname: Lurch
- Commands: Navy Installations Command; Navy Region Europe, Africa, Central; Navy Region Southwest; Naval District Washington; VAW-117
- Awards: Navy Distinguished Service Medal; Defense Superior Service Medal; Legion of Merit (6)

Yancy Benjamen Lindsey (born 1962) is a retired United States Navy vice admiral who last served as Commander, Navy Installations Command. Previously, he was the Commander of the Navy Region Europe, Africa, Central. Lindsey received a Bachelor of Science degree in mechanical engineering from the University of California, Berkeley in 1986 and later earned a Master of Military Science degree from Marine Corps University and a Master of Science degree in global leadership from the University of San Diego.

His retirement ceremony was held on June 2, 2023.

Military offices
Preceded by Markham K. Rich	Commandant of the Naval District Washington; 2015–2016	Succeeded by Charles W. Rock
Preceded by Markham K. Rich	Commander of Navy Region Southwest; 2016	Succeeded by Bette Bolivar
Preceded by Ricky Williamson	Commander of Navy Region Europe, Africa, Central; 2019–2020	Succeeded by Christopher S. Gray
Preceded by Mary M. Jackson	Commander of the Navy Installations Command; 2020–2023	Succeeded by John V. Menoni; Acting
