= Ricky Williamson =

U.S. Navy admiral (born 1962)

Rick Williamson
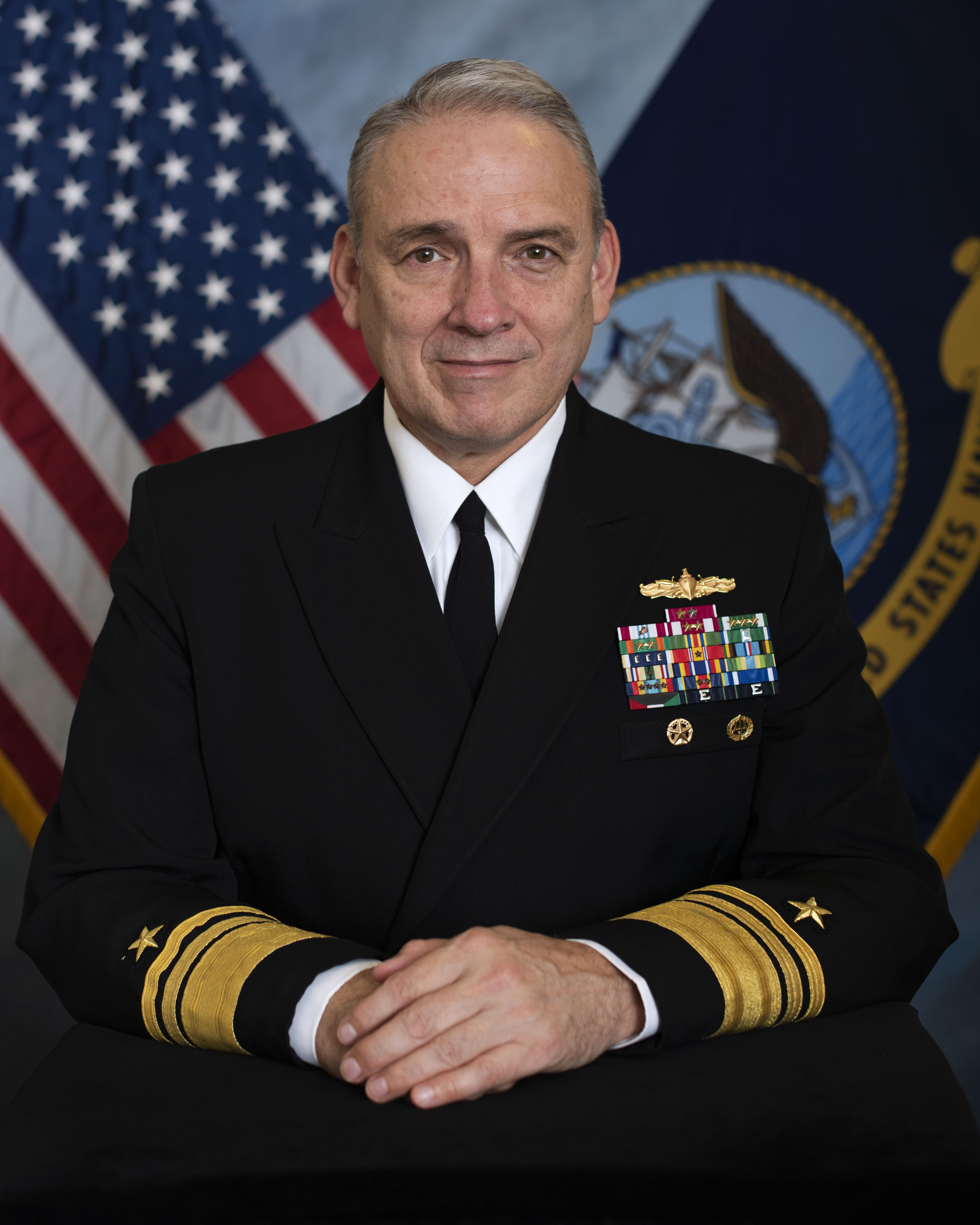
- Born: 1962 (age 63–64); Jacksonville, Florida, U.S.
- Military career
- Allegiance: United States
- Branch: United States Navy
- Service years: 1985–2023
- Rank: Vice Admiral
- Commands: Navy Region Europe, Africa, Central; Navy Region Mid-Atlantic; Navy Region Southeast; Navy Region Hawaii; Naval Base San Diego; USS Simpson (FFG 56)
- Conflicts: Legion of Merit (7)

Ricky Lee Williamson (born 1962) is a retired United States Navy vice admiral who last served as Deputy Chief of Naval Operations for Fleet Readiness and Logistics from June 27, 2019 to December 2023. He previously served as the Commander of Navy Region Europe, Africa, Central, Commander of Navy Region Mid-Atlantic, Commander of Navy Region Southeast, and Commander of Navy Region Midwest. Williamson graduated from the United States Naval Academy with a B.S. degree in computer science in 1985 and later earned an M.B.A. degree from the Naval Postgraduate School in 1990.

Military offices
Preceded by John C. Scorby Jr.	Commander of Navy Region Southeast; 2013–2014	Succeeded by Mary M. Jackson
Preceded by Dixon Smith	Commander of Navy Region Mid-Atlantic; 2014–2016	Succeeded by John C. Scorby Jr.
Preceded by John C. Scorby Jr.	Commander of Navy Region Europe, Africa, Central; 2016–2019	Succeeded by Yancy B. Lindsey
Preceded by Dixon Smith	Deputy Chief of Naval Operations for Fleet Readiness and Logistics of the United States Navy; 2019–2023	Succeeded by Jeffrey Jablon
