= Daniel Holloway =

Daniel Holloway may refer to:

- Daniel Holloway (admiral), U.S. Navy admiral
- Daniel Holloway (cyclist) (born 1987), American cyclist
