= Christopher S. Gray =

U.S. Navy general officer

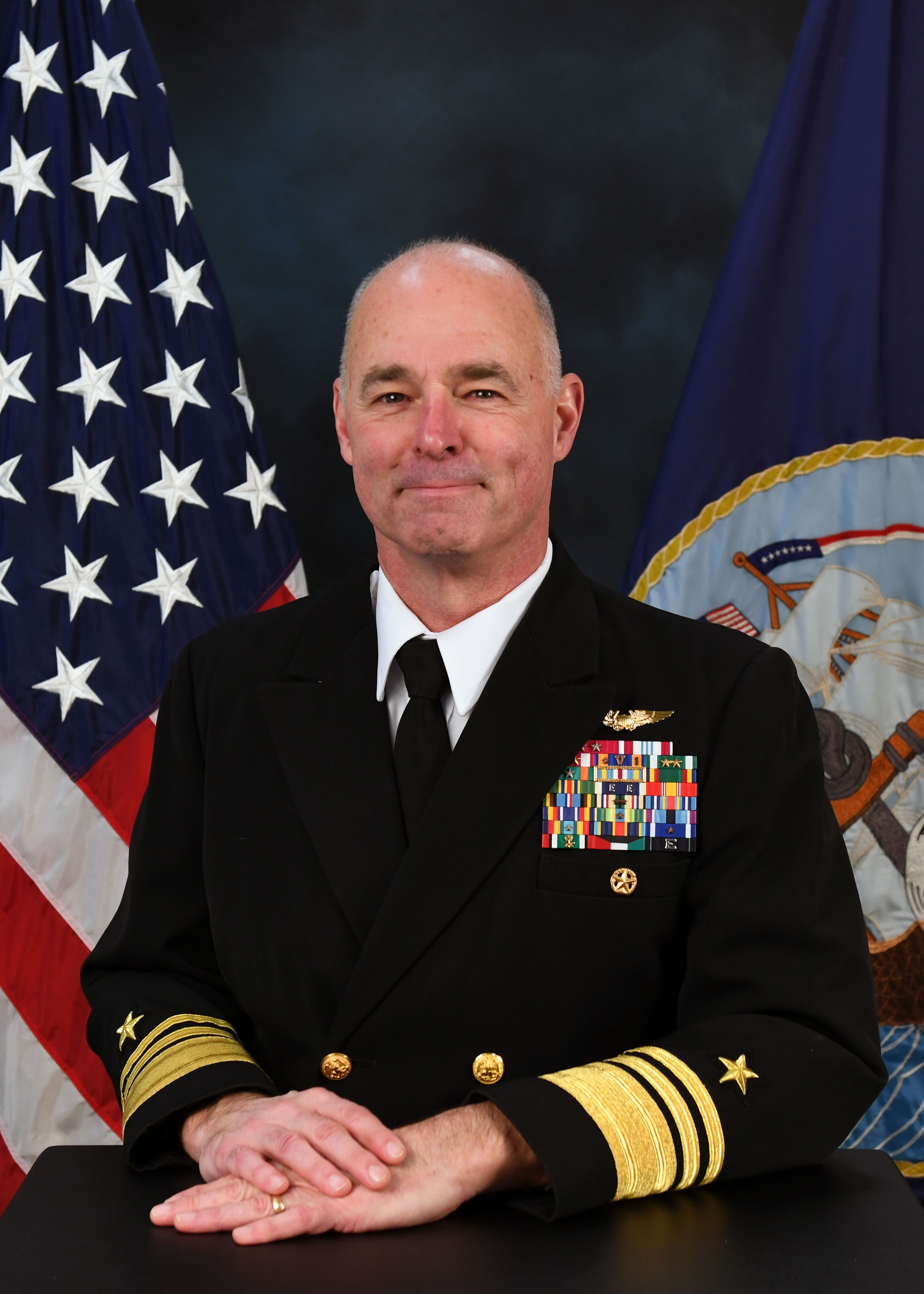
- Official portrait, 2023
- Born: 1964 (age 61–62)
- Military career
- Allegiance: United States
- Branch: United States Navy
- Service years: 1989–present
- Rank: Vice Admiral
- Commands: Navy Installations Command; Navy Region Mid-Atlantic; Navy Region Europe, Africa, Central; Navy Region Northwest; Naval Station Guantanamo Bay
- Awards: Legion of Merit (4)

Christopher Scott Gray (born 1964) is a United States Navy vice admiral who serves as the commander of the Navy Installations Command. He previously served as the commander of Navy Region Mid-Atlantic and Navy Region Europe, Africa, Central.

Gray graduated from the University of South Florida with a B.A. degree in international relations in 1988. After briefly working as an investment banker, he was commissioned as an ensign in June 1989. Gray was designated a naval flight officer in June 1990.

In April 2023, Gray was nominated for promotion to vice admiral with assignment as Commander, Navy Installations Command.

Military offices
Preceded by Gary Mayes	Commander of Navy Region Northwest; 2018–2020	Succeeded by Stephen D. Barnett
Preceded by Yancy Lindsey	Commander of Navy Region Europe, Africa, Central; 2020–2022	Succeeded by Brad J. Collins
Preceded by Charles W. Rock	Commander of Navy Region Mid-Atlantic; 2022–2023	Succeeded by Wesley R. McCall
Preceded by John V. Menoni; Acting	Commander of Navy Installations Command; 2023–present	Incumbent
