= Admiral Lindsay =

Admiral Lindsay may refer to:

- David Lindsay, 1st Duke of Montrose (1440–1495), Lord High Admiral of Scotland
- David Lindsay, 1st Earl of Crawford (c. 1360 – 1407), Lord High Admiral of Scotland
- John Lindsay (Royal Navy officer) (1737–1788), British Royal Navy rear admiral

== See also ==
- Yancy Lindsey (born 1962), U.S. Navy vice admiral
