= Admiral Holloway =

Admiral Holloway may refer to:

- Daniel Holloway (admiral) (born 1956), U.S. Navy vice admiral
- James L. Holloway Jr. (1898–1984), U.S. Navy admiral
- James L. Holloway III (1922–2019), U.S. Navy admiral
- John Holloway (Royal Navy officer) (1744–1826), British Royal Navy admiral
