= Navy Region Southwest =

One of eleven naval regions of the U.S. Navy

Coordinates: 32.7151°N 117.1727°W

Commander, Navy Region Southwest Navy Region Southwest
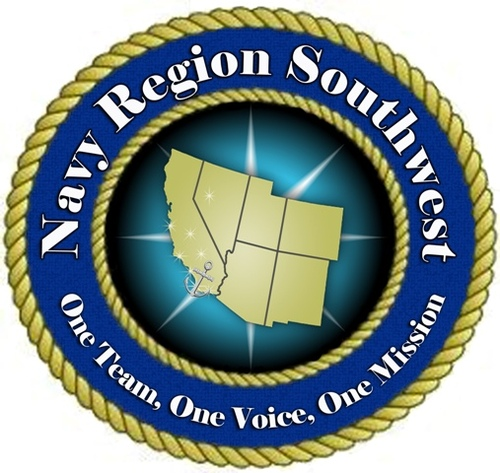
- Command insignia of Navy Region Southwest
- Active: 1999–present
- Country: United States
- Branch: United States Navy
- Type: Region Commander
- Role: Management of installations in the Southwestern United States
- Part of: Naval Installations Command
- HQ: Broadway Complex, San Diego, California
- Nickname: CNRSW
- Website: cnrsw.cnic.navy.mil

Commanders
- Current commander: RDML M. Richard Jarrett

The Navy Region Southwest is one of eleven current naval regions responsible to Commander, Navy Installations Command for the operation and management of Naval shore installations in California, Nevada, Utah, Arizona, Colorado, New Mexico. It is headquartered across from Broadway Pier in downtown San Diego. The command also serves as the regional coordinator for the Commander, U.S. Pacific Fleet, headquartered in Hawaii, coordinating support for bases in Southern California and Nevada.

The Commander also serves as regional environmental coordinator for California, Arizona and Nevada and coordinates and oversees environmental compliance actions with local, state and federal regulatory agencies. Additionally, COMNAVREGSW is responsible for planning and coordinating Department of the Navy response to civil emergencies within the states of Nevada, Utah, Colorado, Arizona and California.

== History ==
Navy Region Southwest comprises the former areas of the Eleventh and Twelfth Naval Districts.

The Eleventh and Twelfth Naval Districts, were both established on 7 May 1903 in accordance with General Order No. 128, signed by Acting Secretary of the Navy Charles H. Darling. The Eleventh Naval District was to be headquartered at the Lake Training Station in Lake Bluff, Illinois, while the Twelfth was to be headquartered at the Mare Island in Vallejo, California. Both districts were part of a larger administrative unit known as the "Ninth, Tenth and Eleventh Naval Districts".

In 1919 when the Ninth, Tenth and Eleventh Districts were split, the Eleventh Naval District, then known as Commander Navy Southwest, established headquarters for the first Commander with a staff of seven officers at Naval Station North Island. In 1922, when the Naval Supply Center buildings at the foot of Broadway Street on Harbor Drive were completed, the Naval Base Headquarters moved to its present site.

With the outbreak of World War II, San Diego's naval establishment played an important role in coordinating the supply provisioning to the war fronts in the Pacific. Naval bases and stations throughout the region were expanded to provide maximum support to combatant forces of the fleet. With Korea, Vietnam and "cold war" commitments, fleet support activities under Commander Naval Base San Diego remained at a very high level. At that time, the Eleventh District consisted of New Mexico; Arizona; Clark County, Nevada; the southern part of California, including Counties of Santa Barbara, Kern, and all of the counties south of (and including) San Bernardino.

When the Twelfth Naval District was disestablished in 1977, Navy Southwest assumed all its duties and responsibilities, and annexed the areas of Colorado, Utah, the rest of Nevada, and the rest of California

The Eleventh Naval District was disestablished on 30 September 1980. However, the Commander, Navy Southwest remained as the commander of Naval Base San Diego.

In 1999 the command was officially renamed Commander Navy Region Southwest.

== Subordinate Commands ==
- Naval Station San Diego
- Naval Base Point Loma (former SUBASE San Diego)
- Naval Base Coronado, including:
  - Naval Air Station North Island
  - Naval Amphibious Base Coronado
  - Naval Auxiliary Landing Field San Clemente Island
  - Naval Outlying Landing Field Imperial Beach
  - Silver Strand Training Complex
  - Mountain Warfare Training Camp Michael Monsoor,
  - Warner Springs Training Area,
- Naval Air Facility El Centro, CA, including:
  - U.S. Naval Observatory Flagstaff Station
- Naval Air Station Lemoore, CA
- Naval Base Ventura County (former Naval Construction Battalion Center Port Hueneme & Naval Air Station Point Mugu)
- Naval Weapons Station Seal Beach, CA and it's detachments in Fallbrook and in Norco, California at Naval Surface Warfare Center Corona
- Naval Air Station, Fallon, NV.
- NSA Monterey, supporting Naval Postgraduate School, Fleet Numerical Meteorology and Oceanography Center, and the United States Naval Research Laboratory - Monterey, Monterey, California
- Naval Air Station China Lake, which supports Naval Air Warfare Center, Weapons Division
