= Navy Region Southeast =

One of eleven naval regions of the U.S. Navy

Coordinates: 30.2201°N 81.6850°W

Commander, Navy Region Southeast Navy Region Southeast
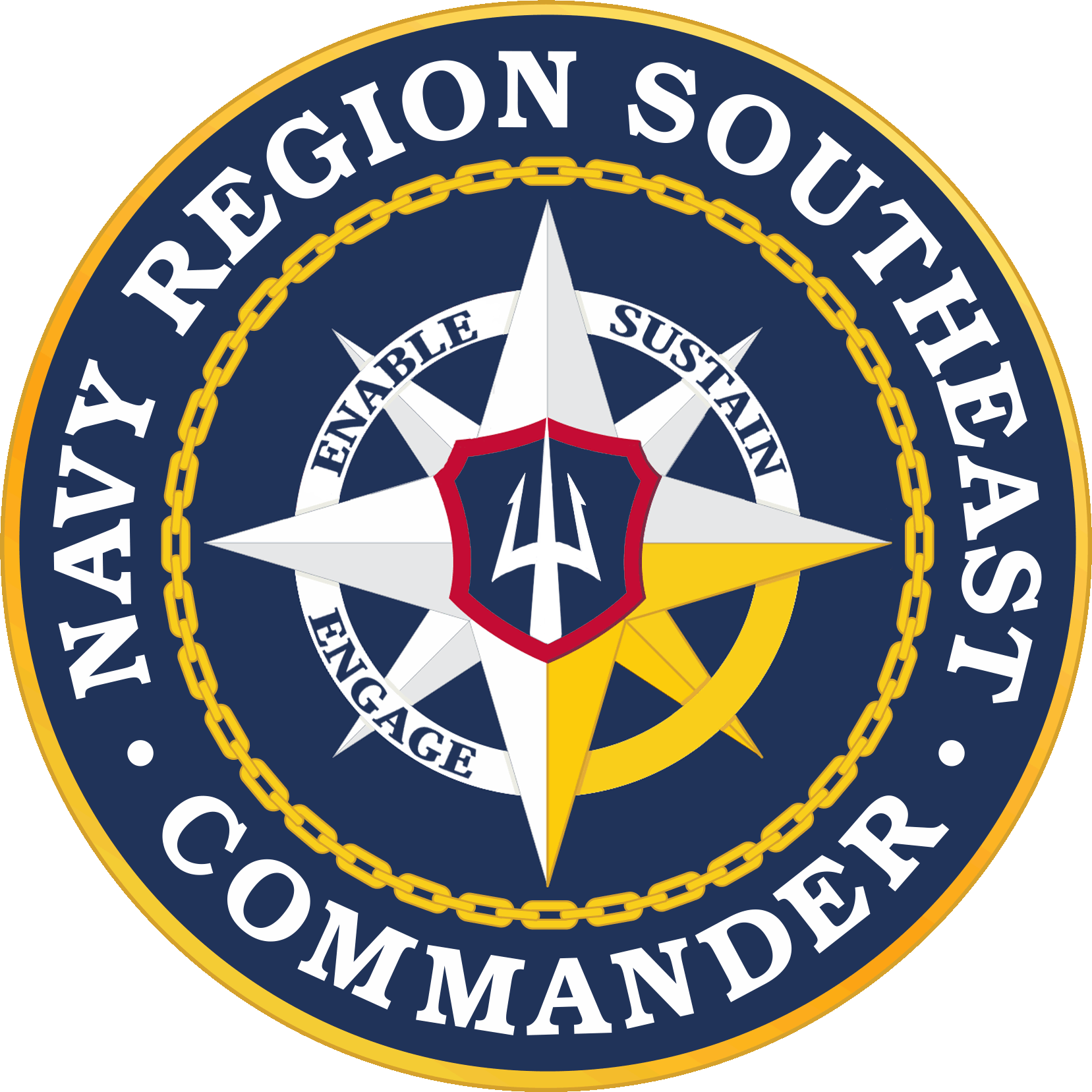
- Command insignia of Navy Region Southeast
- Active: Various Commands:1942 - 1999; As CNRSE:1999 - present
- Country: United States
- Branch: United States Navy
- Type: Region Commander
- Role: Management of naval installations in the Southeastern United States
- Part of: Naval Installations Command
- HQ: Naval Air Station Jacksonville, Florida
- Nickname: CNRSE
- Mottos: "Where the Atlantic Fleet and the Navy's Air Training Command come to train."
- Website: cnrse.cnic.navy.mil Leadership

Commanders
- Current commander: RDML John W. Hewitt

Navy Region Southeast (NAVREGSE or CNRSE) is one of eleven current naval regions responsible to Commander, Navy Installations Command for the operation and management of Naval shore installations in Kansas, Oklahoma, Texas, Missouri, Arkansas, Louisiana, Tennessee, Mississippi, Alabama, Georgia, Florida, and South Carolina. It is headquartered onboard Naval Air Station Jacksonville, in Jacksonville, Duval County, Florida.

CNRSE's motto is "Where the Atlantic Fleet and the Navy's Air Training Command come to train", It gets this motto from the fact that its installations are home to both the Naval Air Training Command located at Naval Air Station Corpus Christi and Naval Education and Training Command, which has its headquarters at Naval Air Station Pensacola. The region's installations also host the United States Navy Flight Exhibition Team, more commonly known as the Blue Angels, which for a brief stint in the late 1940s were under what was then the Naval Air Advanced Training Command.

== History ==
Most of the current day boundaries of NAVREGSE encompass the former 1903 naval districts of the Sixth, Seventh and Eighth Naval Districts. The Sixth District was headquartered at the Charleston Navy Yard back in the 1900s, while the Seventh District was headquartered at the Naval Air Station Key West (then just a Naval Station) and the Eighth District was located at the Pensacola Navy Yard (now NAS Pensacola). All of these districts were formed in 1903 by then-Acting Secretary of the Navy Charles H. Darling.

However, the linear history of the flag command that is now Commander, Navy Region Southeast are traced through its roots as an aviation-based command, starting as Naval Air Operational Training Command in 1942. The command was then responsible for all aviation-related training in the southeast during World War II. The name then changed to Naval Air Advanced Training Command in the mid-1940s with fighter pilot training as the primary focus, followed by a merger in 1948 with Commander, Fleet Air Jacksonville.

The command then went through a number of name changes between 1974 and 1992, where the flag and mission was changed three times in that span. In 1994, the command became Commander, Naval Base Jacksonville and then finally, on Feb. 2, 1999, became Commander, Navy Region Southeast as part of the navy's eventual formation of its parent command, Navy Installations Command.

== Subordinate units/installations ==
As an Echelon III Commander, Commander, Navy Region Southeast reports directly to the Commander, Naval Installations Command for the operation and readiness of the following subordinate commands/installations:

- Naval Air Station Jacksonville
  - Pinecastle Bombing Range in the Ocala National Forest
- Naval Station Mayport, Mayport, Florida
- Naval Air Station Key West, Key West, Florida
- Naval Support Activity Charleston, Goose Creek, South Carolina
- Naval Support Activity Beaufort, Beaufort, South Carolina
- Naval Air Station Pensacola, Pensacola, Florida
- Naval Air Station Whiting Field, Milton, Florida
- Naval Air Station Corpus Christi, Corpus Christi, Texas
- Naval Air Station Kingsville, Kingsville, Texas
- Naval Air Station Joint Reserve Base Fort Worth, Fort Worth, Texas
- Naval Air Station Joint Reserve Base New Orleans, New Orleans, Louisiana
- Naval Support Activity Orlando
- Naval Construction Battalion Center Gulfport, Mississippi
- Naval Station Guantanamo Bay, Guantánamo Bay, Cuba
- Naval Submarine Base Kings Bay, Kings Bay, Georgia
- Naval Air Station Meridian, Meridian, Mississippi
- Naval Support Activity Mid-South, Millington, Tennessee
- Naval Air Station Puerto Cabezas, Puerto Cabezas, Nicaragua
