= Daniel Holloway (admiral) =

U.S. Navy flag officer, businessman (born 1956)

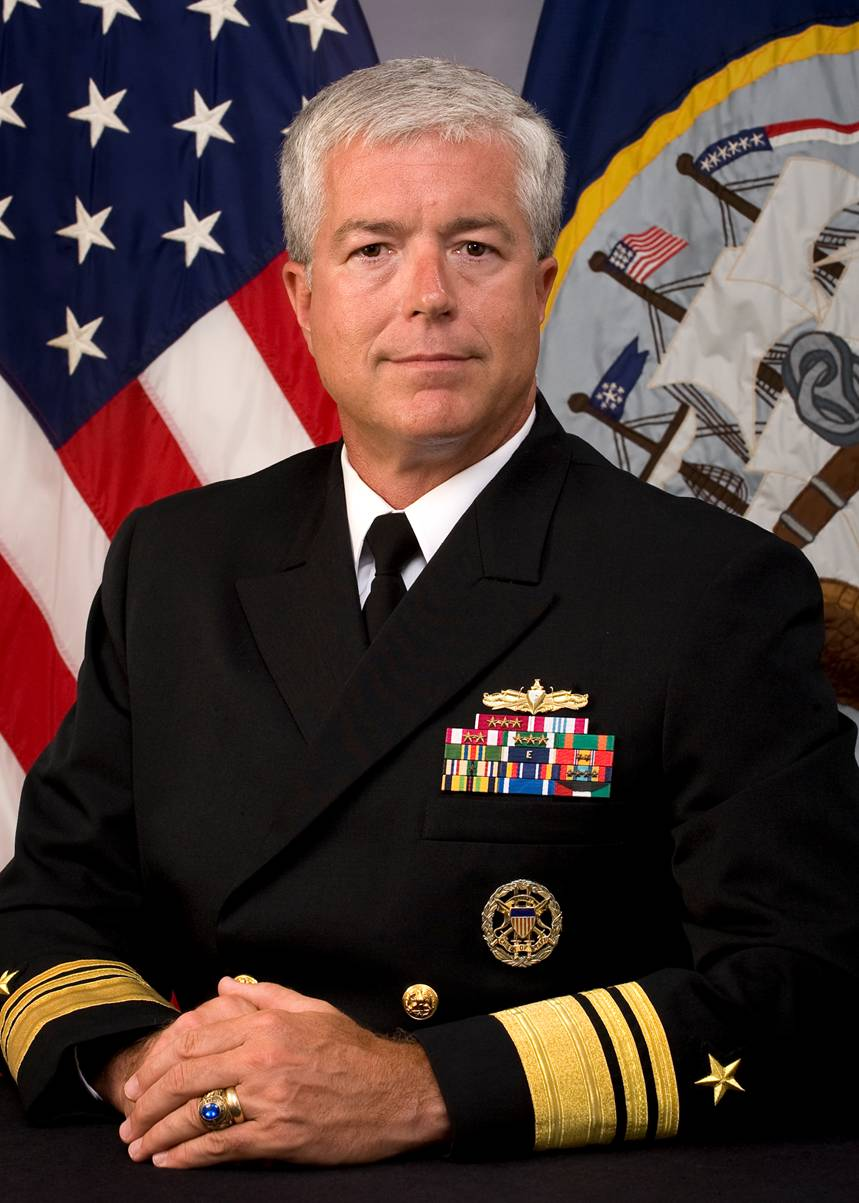
- Vice Admiral Daniel Holloway in August 2010
- Born: 1956 (age 69–70); Philadelphia
- Military career
- Allegiance: United States
- Branch: United States Navy
- Rank: Vice Admiral
- Commands: United States Second Fleet; Carrier Strike Group Twelve; Destroyer Squadron 18; USS Gonzalez (DDG-66)
- Conflicts: Gulf War
- Awards: Legion of Merit (5); Defense Meritorious Service Medal; Meritorious Service Medal (3); Navy and Marine Corps Commendation Medal (4); Navy and Marine Corps Achievement Medal

Vice Admiral Daniel Patrick Holloway Jr. (born 1956) is an American businessman and a retired flag officer of the United States Navy. He is vice president of customer relations for Huntington Ingalls Shipbuilding and is based at HII's Washington, D.C., office. He retired from the Navy in 2011–12, with his final post being Commander, United States Second Fleet, and Director, Combined Joint Operations from the Sea Center of Excellence.

== Early life ==
Holloway was born in Philadelphia, Pennsylvania, and was raised in Maple Shade, New Jersey.

== Naval career ==
Holloway graduated from the United States Naval Academy, Annapolis, Maryland, in 1978. At sea, he served as the damage control assistant and navigator aboard USS Joseph Hewes (FF-1078), engineer officer aboard USS Thorn (DD-988), and commissioning engineer officer aboard USS Leyte Gulf (CG 55). He was the executive officer aboard USS John L. Hall (FFG-32) and served as the chief staff officer to commander, Destroyer Squadron 24. He commanded USS Gonzalez (DDG-66) and Destroyer Squadron 18 and served as commander, Carrier Strike Group Twelve/Enterprise Strike Group from February 2007 to August 2008.

Ashore, Holloway served as the nuclear power officer recruiter at Naval Recruiting District, Philadelphia, and as an instructor and executive assistant for the chairman, Seamanship and Navigation Department at the United States Naval Academy's Professional Development Division. He also served as the assistant commander assignment officer and the cruiser destroyer placement branch chief at the Navy Military Personnel Command, on the Joint Staff in the Information Operations Directorate (J39), as director, Surface Officer Distribution Division (PERS-41) and as assistant commander, Navy Personnel Command for Career Management (PERS-4) in Millington, Tennessee.

Holloway earned a Master of Science degree in Management Information Systems from George Washington University and a master's degree in National Security and Strategic Studies from the National War College. His final assignment was as Commander, United States Second Fleet and Director, Combined Joint Operations from the Sea Center of Excellence.

Military offices
Preceded by Melvin Williams	Director Combined Joint Operations from the Sea Center of Excellence; August 2010 – September 2011	Succeeded by David Buss
