= Combined Joint Operations from the Sea Center of Excellence =

The Combined Joint Operations from the Sea - Centre of Excellence (CJOS COE) is a multinational military unit located in Norfolk, Virginia, accredited by NATO. The current director is Vice Admiral Douglas G. Perry of the United States Navy and the current deputy director is Commodore Don Mackinnon of the British Royal Navy. It is independent from the NATO command structure, and is responsible for promoting best practices within the alliance and assisting with NATO's transformational goals focused on maritime-based joint operations.

== Overview ==
CJOS COE is charged with developing and promoting maritime concepts and doctrine in order for NATO, Sponsoring Nations, Allies and other international partners and organizations to optimize the efficient delivery of Maritime Effect.

== History ==
The CJOS COE was established on May 31, 2006, by the signing of two Memoranda of Understanding (MOU):

- the Operational MOU between the Ministry of Defenses of the host nation (United States) and twelve additional Sponsoring Nations; the MOU formally establishes the CJOS COE and makes provisions for its operation, funding, manning, equipment, and infrastructure, as well as for its administrative and logistical support;
- the Functional MOU establishes the functional relationship between HQ SACT and the CJOS COE. This MOU has been signed by Strategic Allied Command – Transformation and the thirteen Sponsoring Nations.
