= Commander, Navy Installations Command =

Echelon II shore command of the U.S. Navy

Commander, Navy Installations Command Navy Installations Command (UIC - 00052)
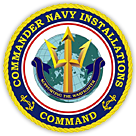
- CNIC Seal
- Founded: 1 October 2003
- Country: United States
- Branch: United States Navy
- Type: Enterprise Command
- Role: Manages, operates, controls and supports naval installations and activities
- Headquarters: Washington Navy Yard, Washington, DC
- Nickname: CNIC
- Mottos: "Sustaining the fleet, enabling the fighter, supporting the family"
- Website: cnic.navy.mil

Commanders
- Commander: VADM Christopher S. Gray
- Deputy Commander: Mr. Timothy K. Bridges

The Commander, Navy Installations Command (CNIC) is an Echelon II shore command responsible for all shore installations under the control of the United States Navy. As an Echelon II command, it reports directly to the chief of naval operations. It is responsible for the operation and management of all Naval installations worldwide through eleven Navy regions.

== Mission ==
Prior to the creation of CNIC, all of the Navy's major shore echelon II commanders (BUMED, NAVSEA, NAVSUP) operated their own installations independently. This led to inconsistent operating procedures, that, when installations operated in close proximity to one another, resulted in sometimes incompatible and significant policy differences. Thus, it was the intent of CNIC to establish a single shore installation management organization that will focus on installation effectiveness and improve the shore installation management community's ability to support the fleet. When it was established October 1, 2003, the stand up of CNIC was an effort in the continuation of fleet and regional shore installation management organizational alignment that began in 1997 with the reduction of installation management claimants from 18 to 8.

== Operations ==
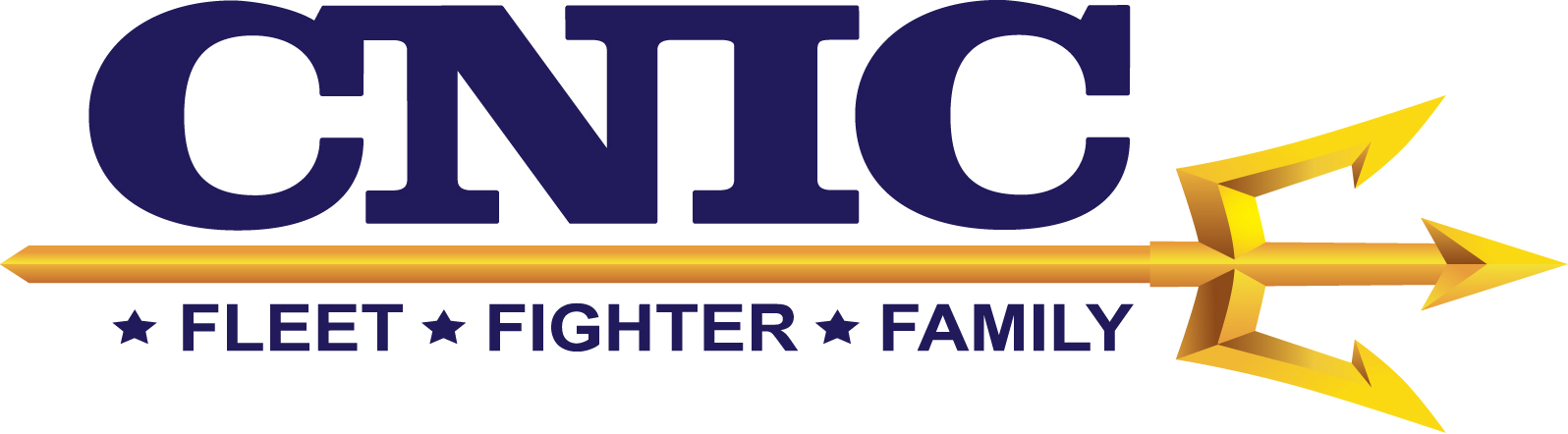
Logo of CNIC

CNIC has overall responsibility and authority for all installation support programs and is the lead for Navy installation policy and program execution oversight. CNIC works to coordinate services across the Naval Enterprises (aka shore Echelon II commands), and best provide the installations, services and programs in their support. These services include installation management and operations, such as port operations, airfields, security, utilities, land use planning, environmental aspects, planning and real estate, and emergency management, as well as fleet support services such as base housing, weapons storage, MWR (Morale, Welfare and Recreation) recreational programs, child care and youth programs.

Its mission is summed up as supporting the three 'F's: "Fleet, Fighter and Family".

- "Fleet" means the operating forces of the Navy. CNIC ensures all installation requirements necessary to train and operate the Fleets (Ports, Airfields, Training Ranges, etc.) are maintained and ready.
- "Fighter" means the men and women in the operating forces. CNIC ensures naval installations are able to facilitate the manning, training and equipping of the Navy's fighting force.
- "Family" means the men and women of the armed forces and their families. To ensure the fighting force is supported on all fronts, CNIC's Family and Community Services, Housing and Safety efforts provide the quality of life, support and services that allow the fighting force to focus on mission accomplishment.

== Regions ==
Historically, each region was a part of one or other United States naval districts from their inception in the early 1900s until their disestablishment in the late 1970s and 1980s. At that point, individual installations were typically operated independent of any true centralized command structure. In 1998, the Navy embarked on a new era in shore management, with San Diego leading the way. As the Navy reduced its operational forces, it became essential for the shore establishment supporting those forces to be realigned.

As part of the new command structure, each naval installation or supported command now reports to one of eleven regional commanders who are responsible for the operation and management of the installations within their regional jurisdiction. Each regional commander is a one-star rear admiral (RDML) with the exception of the commanders of Navy Region Mid-Atlantic, Navy Region Japan and Navy Region EURAFCENT, who can be two-star rear admiral (upper half) (RADM).

	Region	Headquarters	Commander	Jurisdiction
Naval District Washington DC	Naval District Washington	Washington Navy Yard, Washington, D.C.	RDML David J. Faehnle	Washington, D.C., Northern Virginia and the Maryland counties of Prince George's, Montgomery, St. Mary's, Calvert, and Charles
	Navy Region Northwest	Naval Base Kitsap, Silverdale, Washington	CAPT Jason Sherman	Alaska, Washington, Oregon, Idaho, Montana, Wyoming, North Dakota, South Dakota, Nebraska, Minnesota, and Iowa
	Navy Region Southwest	Broadway Complex, San Diego, California	RDML M. Richard Jarrett	California, Nevada, Utah, Arizona, Colorado, and New Mexico
	Navy Region Southeast	Naval Air Station Jacksonville, Jacksonville, Florida	RDML John W. Hewitt	Kansas, Oklahoma, Texas, Missouri, Arkansas, Louisiana, Tennessee, Mississippi, Alabama, Georgia, Florida, and South Carolina
	Navy Region Mid-Atlantic	Naval Station Norfolk, Norfolk, Virginia	RADM Carl A. Lahti	Wisconsin, Illinois, Michigan, Indiana, Ohio, Kentucky, North Carolina, Virginia, West Virginia, Maryland, Delaware, Pennsylvania, New Jersey, New York, Connecticut, Rhode Island, Massachusetts, Vermont, New Hampshire, and Maine
	Navy Region Hawaii	Naval Station Pearl Harbor, Pearl Harbor, Hawaii	RADM Brad J. Collins	Hawaii
	Navy Region Europe, Africa, Central	Naval Support Activity Naples, Naples, Italy	RDML Bradley N. Rosen	Europe, Africa, and Southwest Asia
	Navy Region Japan Commanded by Commander Naval Forces Japan	Fleet Activities Yokosuka, Yokosuka, Kanagawa, Japan	RDML Ian L. Johnson	Japan, the Indian Ocean, and Singapore.
	Navy Region Korea Commanded by Commander Naval Forces Korea	Busan Naval Base, Namgu, Busan, Gyeongnam, South Korea	RDML Neil A. Koprowski	Commander Fleet Activities Chinhae
	Joint Region Marianas Commanded by Commander Naval Forces Marianas	Nimitz Hill, Guam	RDML Brett W. Mietus	Northern Mariana Islands and Guam
	Navy Region Center Singapore Commanded by Commander, Task Force 73/Logistic Group Western Pacific	PSA Sembawang, Singapore	CAPT Silas L. Bouyer II	U.S. Naval forces in Singapore

=== Former regions ===
Navy Region Midwest was disestablished on September 30, 2014 as part of a reorganization of Navy flag billets assets in the wake of the United States budget sequestration in 2013. Formerly headquartered in Great Lakes, Illinois, it included installations in 16 states. These are now split between the Northwest, Mid-Atlantic, and Southeast regions.
