= Mary M. Jackson =

American vice admiral

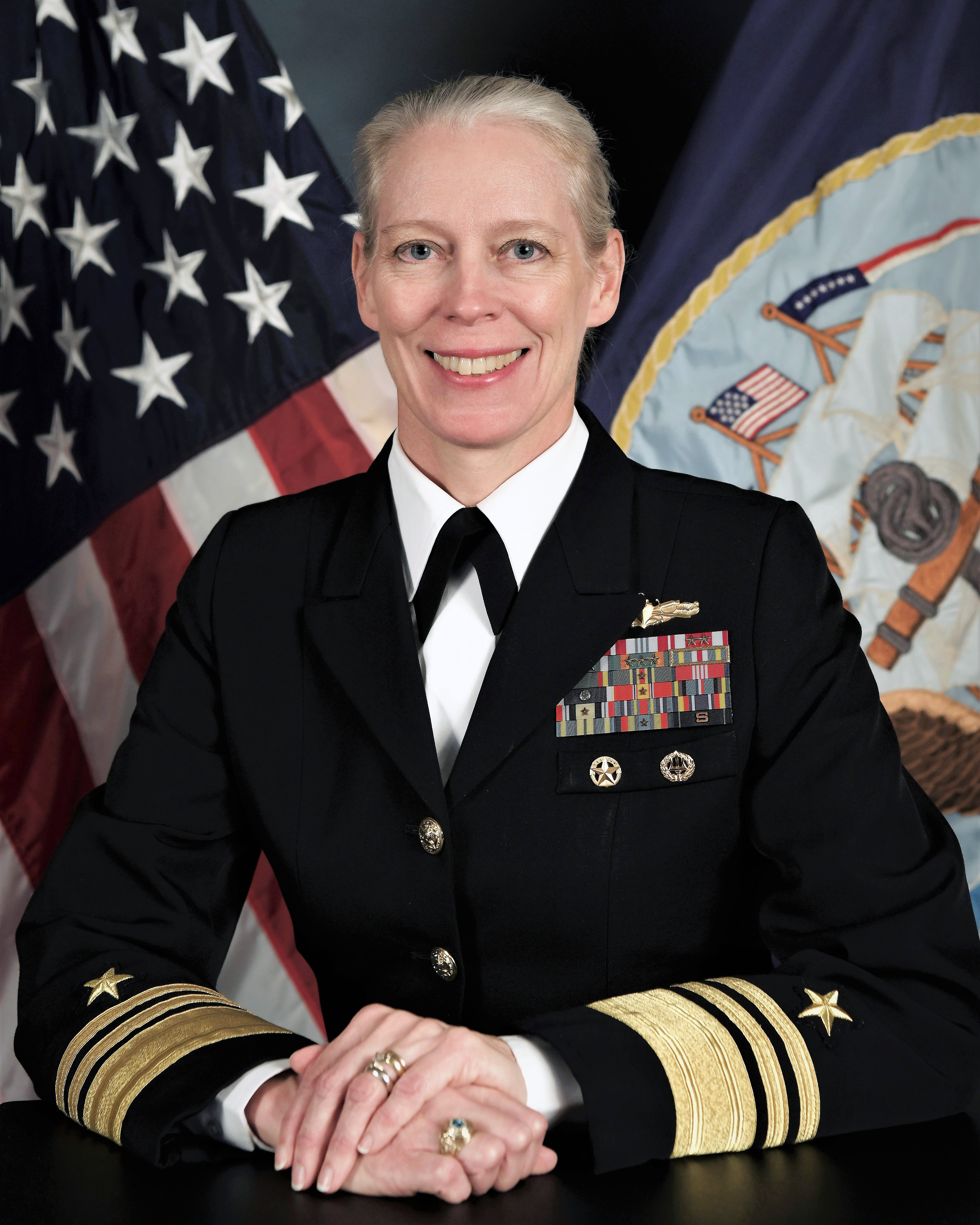
- Jackson in 2017
- Born: 1966 (age 59–60); Spain
- Military career
- Allegiance: United States
- Branch: United States Navy
- Service years: 1984–2020
- Rank: Vice admiral
- Commands: USS McFaul; Naval Station Norfolk; Navy Installations Command
- Awards: Distinguished Service Medal; Legion of Merit (3); Defense Meritorious Service Medal; Meritorious Service Medal (3); Navy and Marine Corps Achievement Medal (4)

Mary Marcella Jackson (born 1966) is a retired United States Navy officer.

== Career ==
Mary Jackson graduated from high school in Wimberley, Texas and her Navy biography list her as a native. However, she was born in Spain and spent 15 years of her life in Saudi Arabia as a child. Her father was a US Army Air Corps officer during World War II and also a geologist. Jackson decided to become an oceanographer at an early age and chose to study with the Navy to save on tuition fees. She graduated from the US Naval Academy in 1988 with a Bachelor of Science degree in physics, but particularly specialised in oceanography. She was awarded a post graduate degree in engineering management from George Washington University.

Jackson became a surface warfare officer in 1989. She served on board ships in the Atlantic and Pacific fleets. This included stints as assistant operations officer and navigator with fleet replenishment ship USS Willamette and as operations officer on the destroyer USS Briscoe and guided missile cruiser USS Vella Gulf. Jackson was executive officer on the guided missile destroyer USS Stout before receiving her first command, the guided missile destroyer USS McFaul. The McFaul was the flagship of Combined Task Force Iraqi Maritime and Destroyer Squadron 50.

Jackson has also served as a navigation and seamanship instructor at the Naval Academy and as theater air and missile defense officer with Joint Forces Command. She was flag secretary to the commander of naval surface forces, chief of staff to the commander of the mid-Atlantic region and has held positions with Navy Personnel Command. Jackson has also been executive officer and commander of Naval Station Norfolk. Jackson commanded Navy Region Southeast from July 18, 2014, to February 23, 2017. She was appointed vice admiral and commander of Navy Installations Command in April 2017, responsible for all of the US Navy's on-shore infrastructure – 71 installations on almost one million acres of land. She was promoted directly from the one-star rank of Rear admiral (lower half) to three-star rank. She relinquished command of Navy Installations in May 2020 and was awarded the Distinguished Service Medal.
