= USS John S. McCain and Alnic MC collision =

2017 maritime accident

USS John S. McCain and MV Alnic MC collision
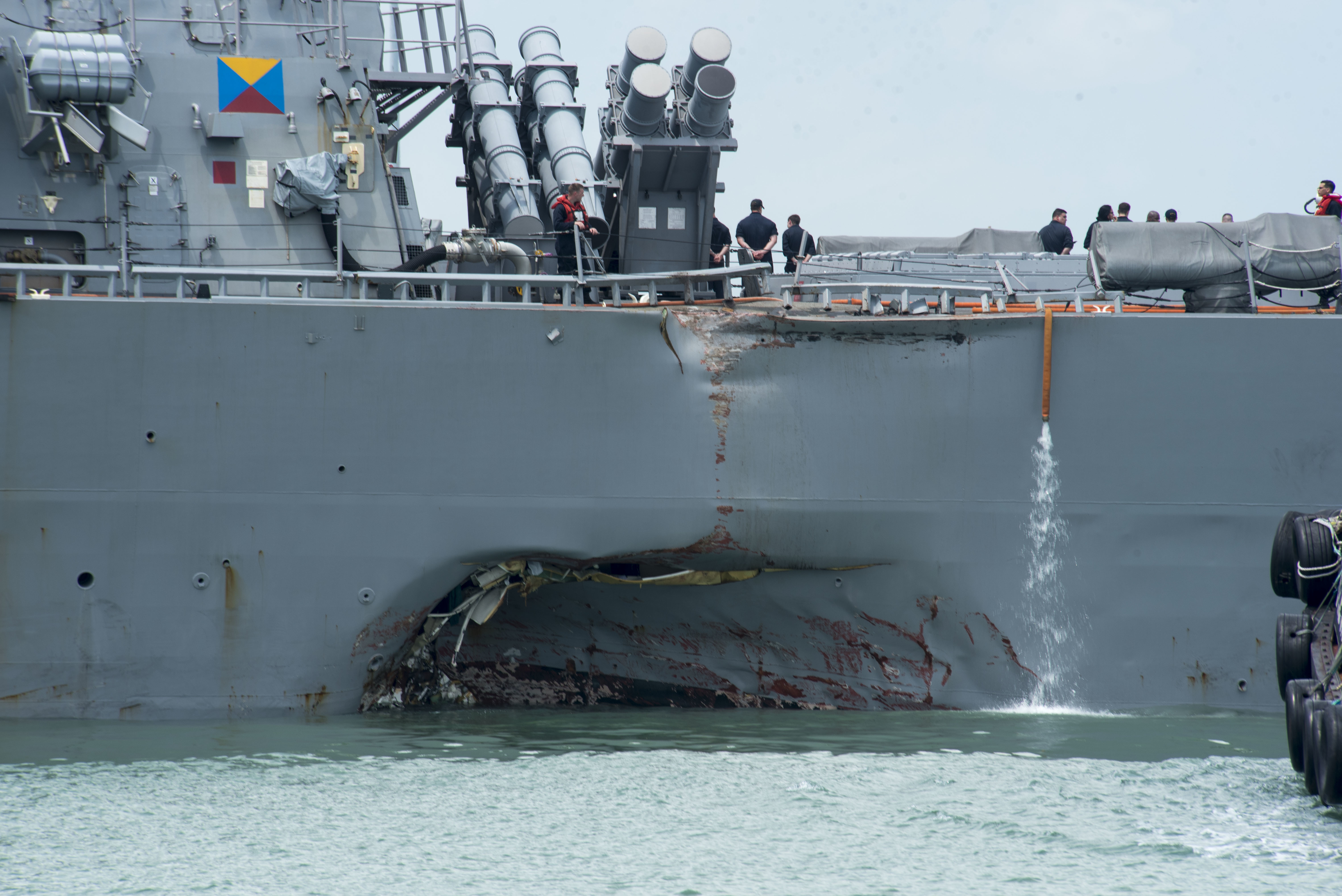
- Damage sustained by John S. McCain
- Date: 21 August 2017
- Time: 5:24 a.m.
- Location: east of the Strait of Malacca
- Cause: fatigued bridge crew, poor communication, and crowded shipping lanes
- Casualties: 10 sailors on USS John S. McCain

At 5:24 a.m. on 21 August 2017, USS John S. McCain, a United States Navy warship, was involved in a collision with the Liberian-flagged tanker Alnic MC off the coast of Singapore and Malaysia, east of the Strait of Malacca. According to a U.S. Navy press release, the breach "resulted in flooding to nearby compartments, including crew berthing, machinery, and communications rooms." Ten US Navy sailors died as a result of the crash, which prompted the Maritime and Port Authority (MPA) of Singapore to start a multi-agency search-and-rescue (SAR) effort as the agency responsible for coordinating SAR operations within Singapore's Maritime Search and Rescue Region (MSRR). The Singapore Transport Safety Investigation Bureau (TSIB) also launched a marine safety investigation following the collision in accordance with the International Maritime Organisation's Casualty Investigation Code in Singapore's capacity as a coastal state, and published its final report on 8 March 2018. The U.S. Navy announced on 24 August 2017 that it had suspended search-and-rescue efforts for survivors in the open sea to focus on the recovery of the remains of the missing sailors still inside the flooded compartments of the ship. By 27 August, U.S. Navy and United States Marine Corps divers had recovered the remains of all ten sailors. On 12 September 2017, the United States' chargé d'affaires Stephanie Syptak-Ramnath expressed thanks for Singapore's support during the SAR operations. The McCain returned to service in June 2020.

== Investigation of incident ==
Immediately after the incident the U.S. Navy reports suggested a fatigued bridge crew, poor communication between crew members and crowded shipping lanes as the most likely culprits. CNN quoted an unnamed "Navy official" stating that the ship lost steering control shortly before the accident but that "it was unclear why the crew couldn't use the ship's backup steering systems".

The collision was the second such incident in just over two months, with the first one occurring between John S. McCain's sister ship USS Fitzgerald and container ship MV ACX Crystal. On the same day as the collision between John S. McCain and Alnic MC, the Pentagon ordered all fleet operations around the world to make a brief "operational pause" for safety checks during the following two weeks, as well as beginning a full safety review. The U.S. 7th Fleet commander at the time of the accident, Vice Admiral Joseph Aucoin, was relieved of his position on 23 August 2017 for "loss of confidence in his ability to command". Rear Admiral Richard Brown was named to lead an internal investigation of the accident. Brown is a former commander of another Arleigh Burke-class sister ship, The Sullivans and currently serves as commander of Naval Personnel Command and deputy chief of Naval Personnel.

On 18 September 2017, the new U.S. 7th Fleet commander, Vice Admiral Phillip Sawyer, as part of the investigations into four surface ship incidents involving Navy ships in the Western Pacific in 2017, including the collision involving John S. McCain, ordered that Rear Admiral Charles Williams, Commander Task Force 70, and Captain Jeffrey Bennett, commodore of Destroyer Squadron 15, be removed from their positions due to a loss of confidence in their ability to command. On 10 October 2017, John S. McCain's commanding officer, CDR Alfredo J. Sanchez and executive officer, CDR Jessie L. Sanchez, were both relieved due to a loss of confidence. A statement from U.S. 7th Fleet Public Affairs stated that "while the investigation is ongoing, it is evident the collision was preventable, the commanding officer exercised poor judgment, and the executive officer exercised poor leadership of the ship’s training program." Commander Ed Angelinas, former commanding officer of USS McCampbell, and Lieutenant Commander Ray Ball, chief engineer of USS Antietam, were appointed acting commanding officer and acting executive officer of John S. McCain.

In August 2019, Admiral Bill Galinis, who oversees U.S. Navy ship design, said the touchscreen-based control systems were "overly complex" because shipbuilders had little guidance on how they should work, so sailors were not sure where key indicators could be found on the screen; this confusion contributed to the collision. The Navy is planning to replace all touchscreens with wheels and throttles on all of its ships, starting in mid-2020.

=== Initial US Navy report ===
On 1 November 2017, the US Navy issued a "Memorandum for distribution". The memorandum defines the legal privilege of such reports, but in the interests of transparency authorizes the release of the two reports covering collisions of Fitzgerald and John McCain. The two reports are annexed to the memorandum. The reports are intended to be authoritative, but are not balanced; they specifically exclude a detailed examination of the actions of ACX Crystal and Alnic MC respectively. The report for John S. McCain detailed the following;

- On 20 August, navigation briefs were prepared for the transit of the Singapore Strait and rudder swing checks were performed. Shortly after midnight, a log entry revealed that one radar was inoperable.
- After 01:00, more frequent position checks were recorded as the ship approached the straits and the Commanding Officer (CO) was on the bridge.
- At 02:16, the ship's propulsion configuration was changed. Normally the two propeller shafts are controlled as one at the Ship's Control Console (SCC), but for increased maneuverability, they can be separated so that the port and starboard shafts are each controlled by its own throttle.
- At 04:18, the ship changed to "Modified Navigation Detail", in which additional watchstanders were present on the bridge. This was normal for a U.S. Navy ship when approaching within 10 nautical miles (19 km; 12 mi) of shallow water.
- From 04:27, the position was determined and logged at 5-minute intervals.
- At 04:36, the ship switched from automatic to manual control of steering. Various changes of course were required to avoid shipping, but they were not logged.
- At 04:54, there was radar contact with Alnic MC, ahead at a range of under 8 nautical miles (15 km; 9.2 mi).
- John S. McCain continued to make small alteration of course to avoid other vessels and by 05:18 was running at 20 knots (37 km/h; 23 mph) on a bearing of 230T. To keep this course against a tidal stream, she was carrying between 1 and 4 degrees of right rudder.
- Shortly thereafter, the CO realized that the helmsman was having difficulty in managing both the helm and the propulsion control and ordered the helm to be transferred to the lee helm watch station.
- At 05:20:39, control of the helm passed to the lee helm position, the change bringing the rudder amidships.
- At 05:20:47, the lee helm also took control of the port shaft.
- At 05:21, the lee helm reported that he had lost steering and the conning officer ordered steering control to the offline steering units and the aft control position was ordered to be crewed. Port and starboard steering were transferred to the aft position at 05:21:13 and 05:21:15, respectively.
- At 05:22, the ship was turning to port and the CO ordered the external lights to be changed to "ship not under command", a warning to all vessels that the Navy ship could not control her course.
- Over the next minute, the lee helm took control of the starboard shaft, not realizing that the port throttle was uncoupled. The CO ordered a reduction in speed, but only the port propeller was slowed, thereby increasing the turn to port.
- The executive officer warned the CO that the ship was not slowing, so the CO ordered a further reduction in speed, increasing the rate of turn. The CO should have announced that he was personally taking control of maneuvering, but failed to do so.
- The conning officer ordered "right standard rudder" to turn to starboard at 05:23 and a second later the after steering position took control.
- 15 seconds later, the main helm position regained control in "backup manual mode".
- At 05:23:24, the throttles were finally matched and the ship started to slow.
- Three seconds later, the aft helmsman took back control of the steering. The report notes that this was the fifth change of control in two minutes.
- At 05:23:44, fifteen degrees of rudder was ordered and John S. McCain finally ceased to turn.
- Fourteen seconds later, at 05:23:58, the collision occurred.

The ship's user interface was found to have contributed to the sailors' confusion.

At no point did either ship sound a warning signal of five short blasts on the whistle (Colregs rule 34(d)) or attempt to contact the other via VHF radio. The report describes the actions taken in the aftermath of the collision. On page 49 it states that the external lights were changed to "red over red" ("vessel not under command"), but the timeline on page 65 claims that this was done at 05:22, at least a minute before the collision.

The report criticizes John S. McCain under two headings: "Seamanship and Navigation" and "Leadership and Culture". The former heading mentions that a higher state of readiness was required in congested waters, that the "Sea and Anchor" detail should have been set earlier and that both vessels failed to sound the required signals or use VHF. The latter heading contains criticisms about the ship's organization. Specifically the CO did not set the Sea and Anchor watch, watchstanders had not attended the navigation brief, leadership failed to assign sufficient experienced officers, the CO issued unplanned orders which were not communicated to the watch officers, who in turn failed to provide input and backup to the CO.

=== NTSB accident report ===
On June 19, 2019, the National Transportation Safety Board (NTSB) released their report on the accident. Their finding that the probable cause of the incident was a "lack of effective operational oversight of the destroyer by the US Navy, which resulted in insufficient training and inadequate bridge operating procedures." Along with their complete report they provided a series of recommendations including changes to Navy bridge equipment and training procedures. This is the first independent investigation document released on any of the recent US Navy navigation incidents.

=== Litigation ===
Energetic Tank, Inc., the owner of the Alnic MC, filed a petition under the Limitation of Liability Act of 1851 in Federal court in New York. The Federal court in 2022 ruled that the Alnic MC was 20% responsible for the collision and the McCain was 80% responsible. It awarded the Federal government $37 million in damages plus interest. The ruling was affirmed on appeal. The United States Supreme Court denied the owner's petition to hear the case.

== Transport to Yokosuka ==
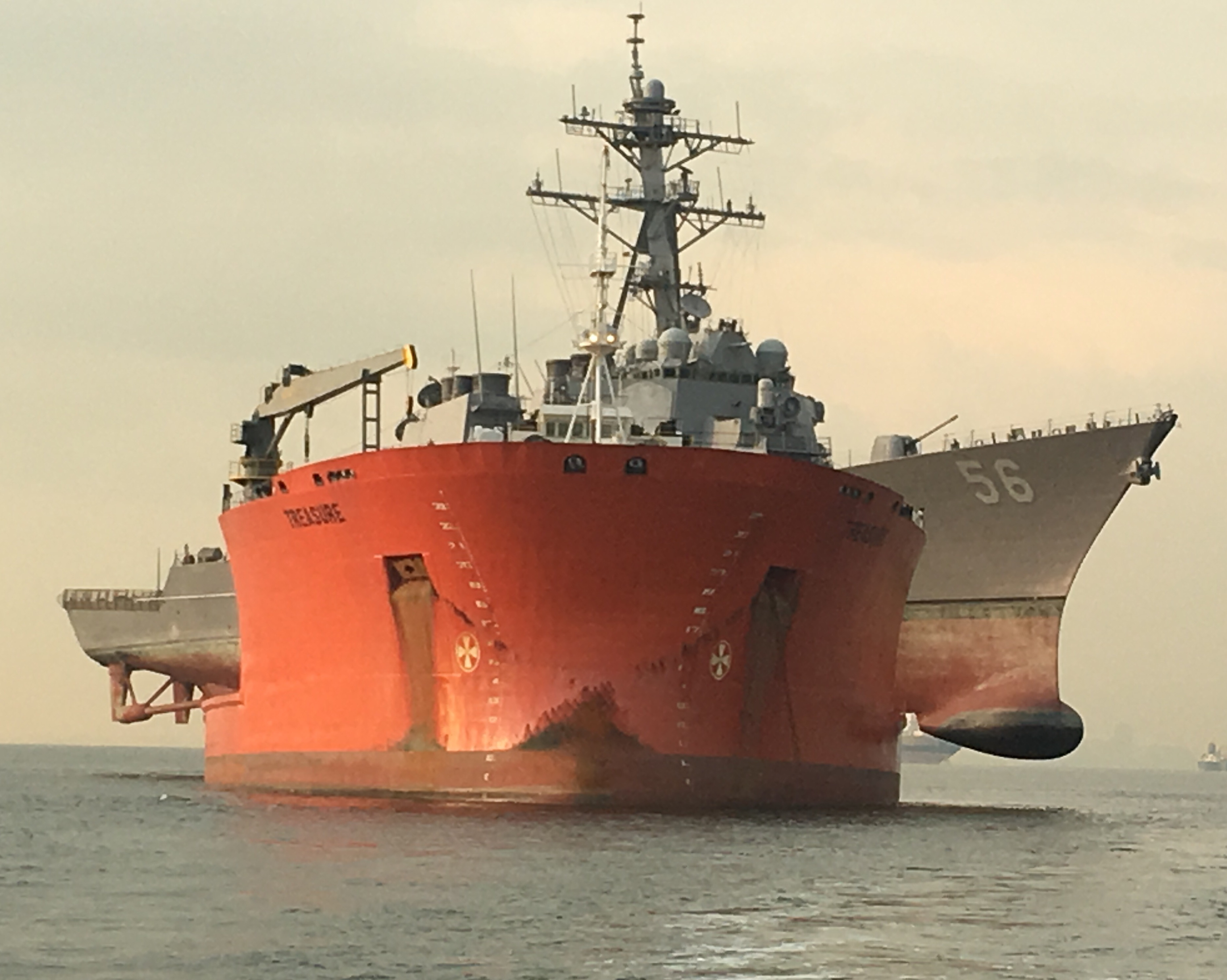
John S. McCain aboard the MV Treasure, 7 October 2017

On 6 September 2017, Military Sealift Command awarded a contract to Dockwise, a marine transport company, to move the damaged John S. McCain in late September from Singapore to a US repair facility in Yokosuka, Japan, where a damage assessment was completed. Repairs were expected to take up to a year at an estimated cost of US$223 million. She left Singapore on 11 October 2017 aboard the heavy transport ship MV Treasure, bound for Yokosuka. For most of 2018, John S. McCain was in drydock for repairs at Fleet Activities Yokosuka. In November 2018, the ship left drydock and was transferred to a pier to continue her repairs. On 27 October 2019, the USS John S. McCain completed repairs and returned to sea, with upgrades to multiple ship's systems.

The Chief of Naval Operations statement on the John S. McCain collision

John S. McCain's ship's company holding a pep talk shortly after the collision

USS John S. McCain pulls into port at Changi Naval Base in Singapore

United States House Committee on Armed Services hearing on Navy Readiness – Underlying Problems Associated with the USS Fitzgerald and the USS John S. McCain (7 September 2022)

== See also ==
- HNoMS Helge Ingstad – Fridtjof Nansen-class frigate of the Royal Norwegian Navy collision with oil tanker − 2018
- HMAS Melbourne and HMAS Voyager collision – 1964 collision between two Royal Australian Navy warships in Jervis Bay, Australia
- HMAS Melbourne and USS Evans collision – 1969 ship collision in the South China Sea
- MV Otowasan and USS Porter collision – Arleigh Burke-class destroyer − 2012
- USS Fitzgerald and MV ACX Crystal collision – 2017 maritime accident
- US–Japan Status of Forces Agreement – 1960 agreement between Japan and the United States
