= USS Fitzgerald and MV ACX Crystal collision =

2017 maritime accident

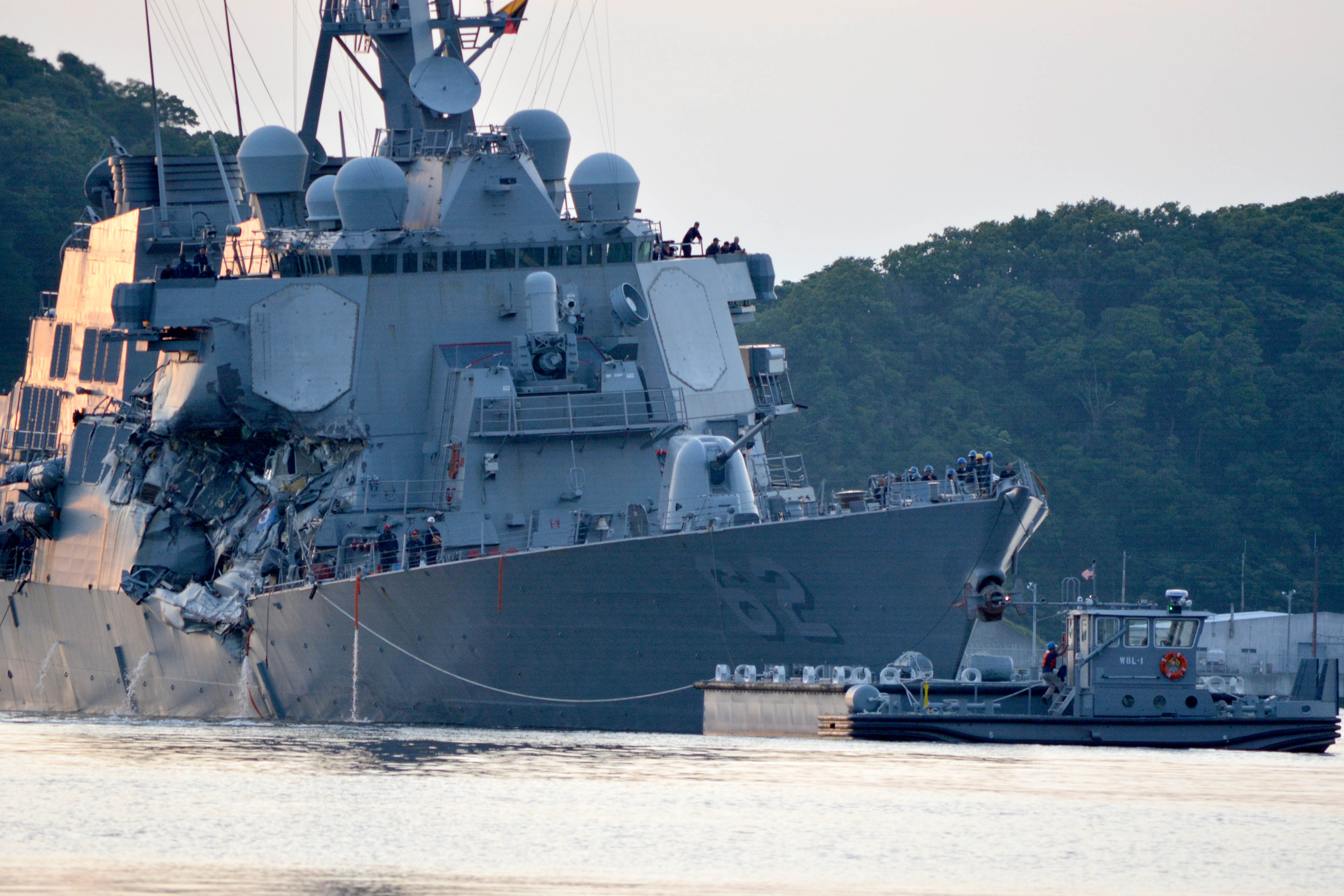
- USS Fitzgerald returns to base after the collision
- Date: 17 June 2017
- Time: about 1:30 a.m. JST
- Location: 56 nautical miles (104 kilometres; 64 miles) southwest of Yokosuka, Japan; 34°32′N 139°05′E
- Deaths: 7 on USS Fitzgerald
- Injuries: 3 confirmed

Early on 17 June 2017, the United States Navy destroyer USS Fitzgerald collided with MV ACX Crystal, a Philippine-flagged container ship, about 80 nautical miles (150 kilometres; 92 miles) southwest of Tokyo, Japan; 10 nautical miles (19 km; 12 mi) southeast of the city of Shimoda on the Japanese mainland (Honshu).

The accident killed seven Fitzgerald sailors. Their bodies were recovered from the flooded berthing compartments of the ship. At least three more of the crew of nearly 300 were injured, including the ship's commanding officer, Commander Bryce Benson. The top two senior officers and the top enlisted sailor were relieved of duty and faced criminal charges, which were later dismissed; about a dozen other sailors received non-judicial punishment. The owners of the merchant vessel agreed to pay $27 million in compensation to the US Navy.

== Synopsis of events ==
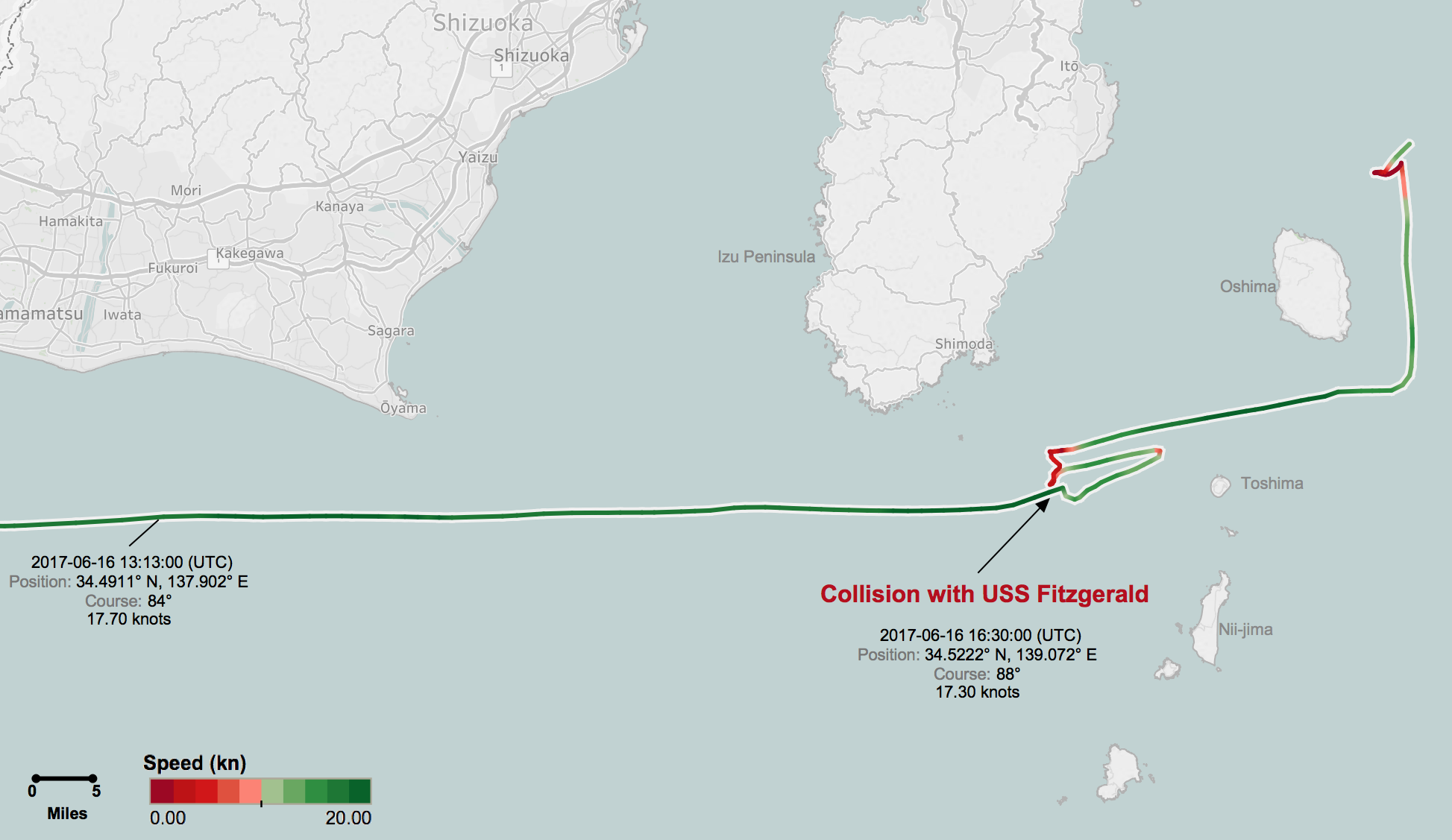
Course of MV ACX Crystal from 6/16/17 12:05 UTC to 6/17/17 3:00, showing presumptive point of collision with USS Fitzgerald at 16:30 UTC (1:30 a.m. Japan Time), south of Japanese mainland

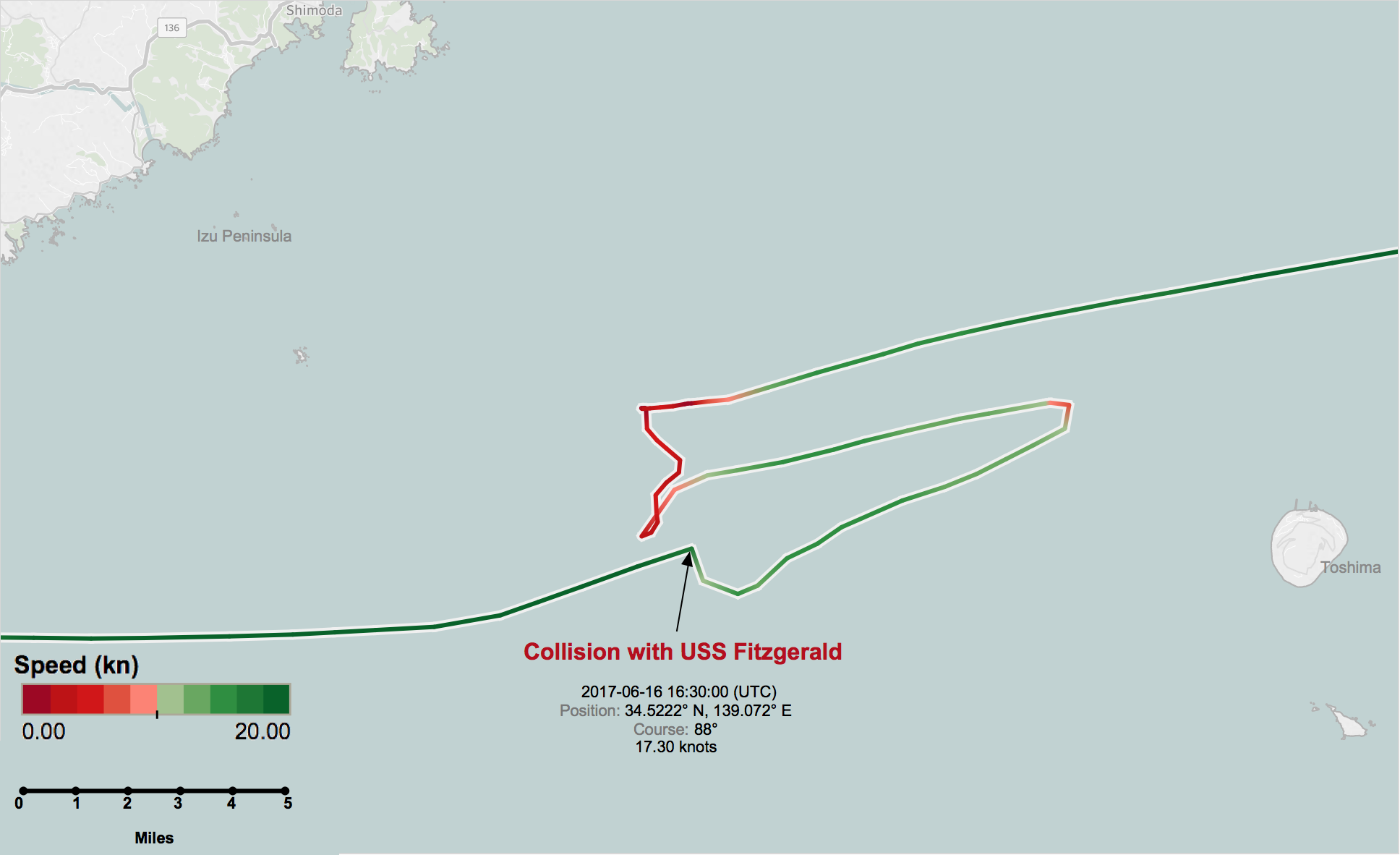
Detail of the movements of ACX Crystal

In a report released on 1 November 2017 the Navy describes Fitzgerald's course in the half-hour prior to the collision as running 190T (nearly due south), with a speed of 20 knots (37 km/h; 23 mph). At about 01:17 Fitzgerald's OOD (Officer of the Deck, responsible for the ship's course and maneuvering) misjudged the course of ACX Crystal. At 01:25 the OOD, Lieutenant Sarah Coppock, noticed ACX Crystal getting closer, and ordered a turn to 240T (that is, to turn to the right and pass behind ACX Crystal), but then rescinded the order. Instead she "ordered an increase to full speed and a rapid turn to the left (port)" (to pass ahead of ACX Crystal), but "these orders were not carried out." At 01:29 the "Boatswain Mate of the Watch [BMOW], a more senior supervisor on the bridge, took over the helm and executed the orders." The Navy has not said what those orders were, nor what transpired on the bridge following the collision at 01:30. Among other failings the Navy says "physical look out duties" were not performed on the starboard (right) side, where ACX Crystal and two other ships were approaching.

The collision damaged Fitzgerald's starboard (right) side, including a "large gash near the keel" in the hull below the waterline, according to the commander of the US Seventh Fleet, Vice Admiral Joseph Aucoin. The container ship's bulbous bow penetrated the destroyer's hull below the waterline, flooding a machinery space, the radio room, and two crew berthing spaces with sea water. The collision also destroyed the captain's cabin, according to Aucoin. Hours of damage control by Fitzgerald's crew kept the ship from sinking.

The executive officer assumed command as the destroyer returned to port with the assistance of tugs, the destroyer USS Dewey, and the Japan Coast Guard.

The Japan Coast Guard and Japan Maritime Self-Defense Force participated in the search-and-rescue operations, including evacuating Benson by helicopter. The other injured sailors were evacuated by US military helicopters.

Although the collision occurred at night, the weather was clear. US and Japanese inquiries were begun to investigate the cause of the collision.

=== Casualties ===
Seven deaths were reported, all of them US Navy sailors aboard Fitzgerald. Three other sailors aboard Fitzgerald were injured, including the commanding officer, Commander Bryce Benson. On 11 July, Benson was temporarily relieved of command by Captain Jeffrey Bennett, Commodore, Destroyer Squadron 15, while Benson recuperated from injuries sustained in the collision. Commander John Fay assumed temporary duties as Fitzgerald's commanding officer.

=== Discrepancies about the time of collision ===
The time of the collision was unclear at first, but in the days after the collision a time of 01:30 was generally accepted. On 19 June (Japan Standard Time)—two days after the collision—the Japan Coast Guard and Nippon Yusen (NYK Line), ACX Crystal's operator, said, after further investigation, the collision was at about 01:30. At this time, ACX Crystal made a sudden turn, according to Automatic Identification System (AIS) data. (US Navy ships frequently turn off their AIS to preserve operational security.) The US Navy initially said the event was at 02:20, when AIS data showed the cargo ship returning to the same area where it had turned earlier, and five minutes before the event was reported to the Japan Coast Guard by ACX Crystal at 02:25. That same day, the US Navy said "all aspects of this incident" were under investigation and declined to comment on the discrepancy. On 20 June, the Navy said it was "not disputing" the Japan Coast Guard and ACX Crystal's captain's timeline, adding later that the Navy would not comment again on the time of the collision until after its investigation was complete. In the Navy's report released on 1 November the time of the collision is given as 01:30:34.

NYK Line was unable to provide information on what happened between the time of the collision and the report. The Japan Coast Guard is investigating whether the collision was reported promptly.

=== Right-of-way rules ===
It was speculated that on the one hand, because the impact was on starboard side of Fitzgerald, there may have been a crossing situation where the rules of the sea required Fitzgerald to give way; but on the other hand, if Crystal was the overtaking vessel, Crystal was under a duty to keep clear. Equally, it was recognised that other unknown facts, such as the presence of other ships in the immediate vicinity, could have affected the obligations on each ship.

=== ACX Crystal's behavior ===
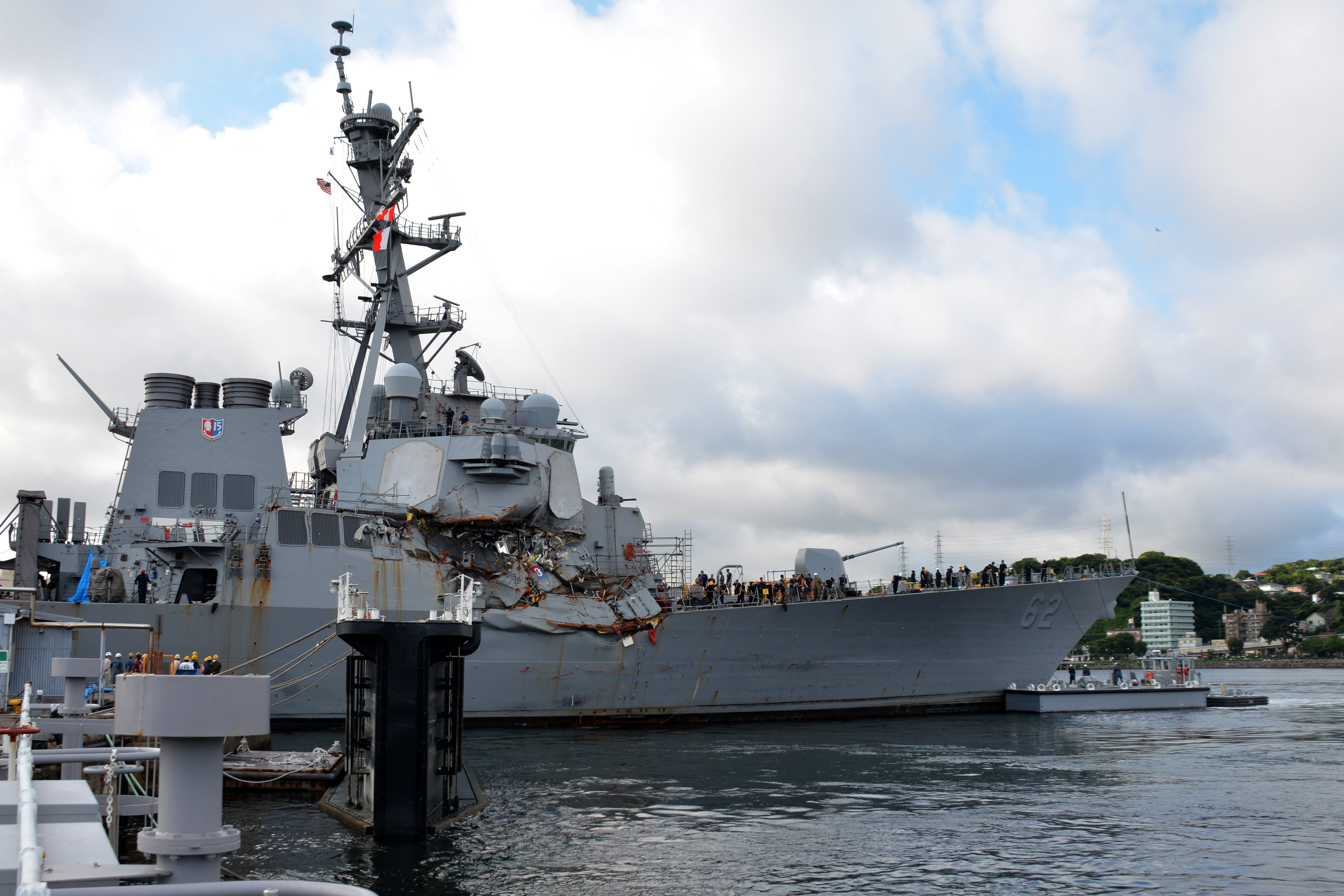
Fitzgerald moves into dry dock on 11 July 2017

After hitting Fitzgerald, ACX Crystal continued on course for 30 minutes, then returned to the collision location. Afterwards, she resumed her original course. Investigators sought to understand why Fitzgerald's crew and sensor systems did not seem to have detected ACX Crystal in time to avoid the incident. ACX Crystal's captain, in a report to the ship's owner seen by Reuters, said that Fitzgerald continued sailing on a collision course despite ACX Crystal signalling with flashing lights the imminent danger. The US Navy did not comment on the report.

=== Damage to USS Fitzgerald ===
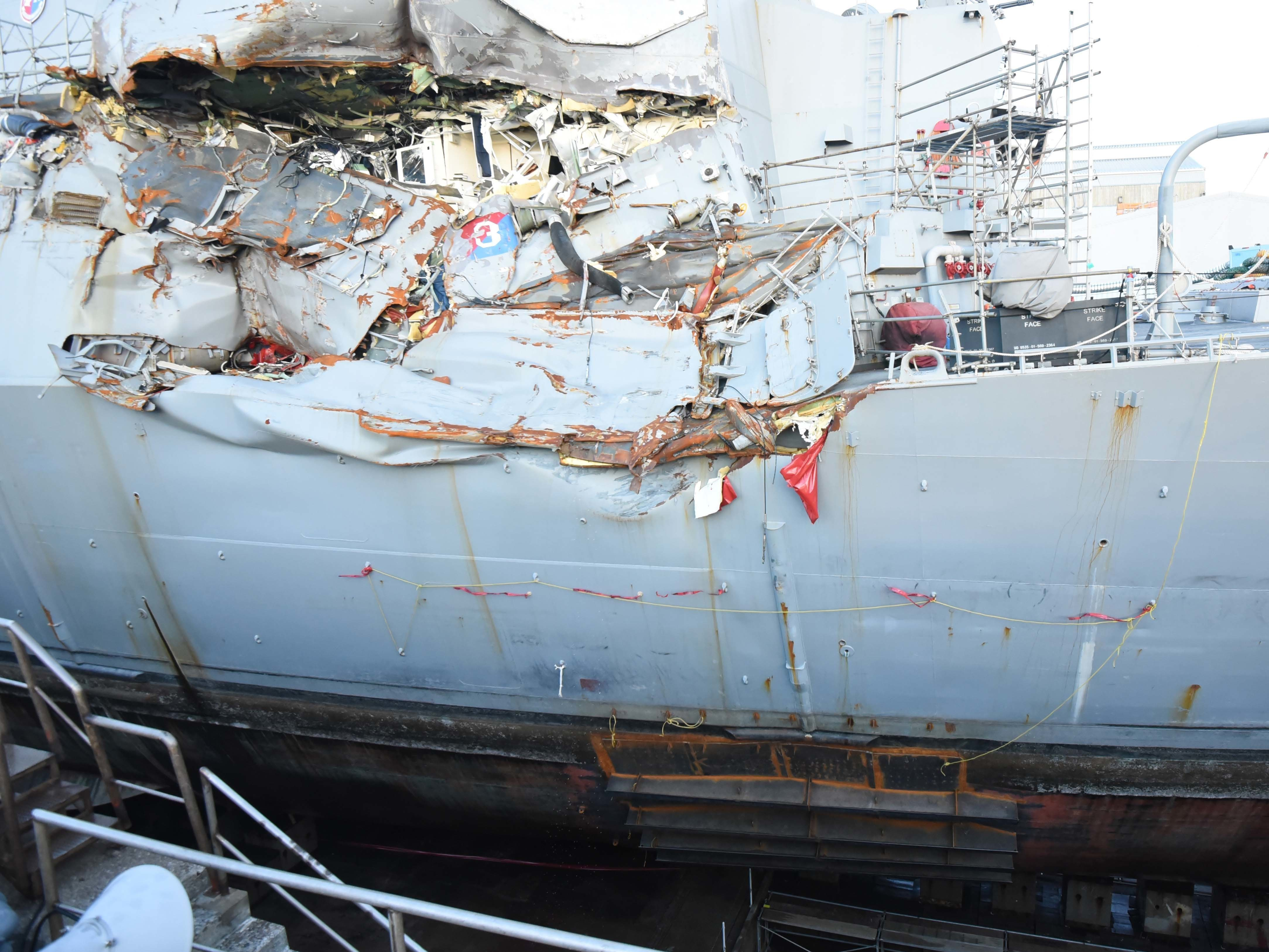
A detailed view of the damage to Fitzgerald. A patch has been welded over the below-waterline damage. Image taken while in dry dock on 11 July 2017

The Navy initially said Fitzgerald was repairable and would be back in service within twelve months. A few days later, Navy officials said the superstructure, damaged in the collision, might have been warped, which could create alignment problems for the AN/SPY-1 radar, which itself had been damaged on the starboard side. Flooding extended to a main engineering space and Radio Central, destroying equipment worth millions of dollars. The Navy planned to bring the ship into drydock between 6 and 8 July, with an adapted dry dock plan taking account of the damage caused to the hull by the collision. In the event Fitzgerald entered a dry dock in Yokosuka on 11 July. It was reported that this was for the Navy to evaluate the extent of the damage to Fitzgerald before deciding whether to repair the ship in Japan or in the United States, however an analyst at the Center for Strategic and Budgetary Assessments said the repairs could not be done overseas, and the dry dock inspection was principally to determine if the ship could return to a private shipyard in the US under its own power, or, more likely, would have to be carried back on a heavy-lift ship. The costs for the repair were expected to be in the tens of millions of dollars. Fitzgerald was scheduled to undergo a planned modernization in 2019, but it was unclear if the timeline for that would be affected by the repairs. Including costs for planned service life extension and other upgrades, repairs for the damage to Fitzgerald are expected to run about $368.7 million.

In late August 2017, it was reported that the destroyer would be transported by the Dockwise heavy-lift ship MV Transshelf to Huntington Ingalls Industries' shipyard in Pascagoula. On 28 November 2017, the destroyer was further damaged by two punctures to its hull during the loading process to Transshelf.

Following repairs, on 3 February 2020, USS Fitzgerald exited the Pascagoula shipyard for sea trials aimed at testing all shipboard systems. It was planned that following these sea trials, Fitzgerald would return to the shipyard to correct any remaining issues and then commence crew training in preparation for its return to active duty.

== Investigations ==
=== Findings against Fitzgerald ===
Within a day of the collision, investigations were begun by the United States Navy, US Coast Guard, Japan Coast Guard, Japan Transport Safety Board, and ACX Crystal's insurers. The US Navy conducted an internal inquiry of its crew operations, led by Rear Admiral Brian Fort, former commander of the USS Gonzalez and the present commander of Navy Region Hawaii and commander of Naval Surface Group Middle Pacific. The US and Japanese coast guards investigated the cause of the accident. On 22 June, Japanese investigators said they had the cargo ship's data recorder.

Preliminary findings suggest the accident was caused by multiple errors by Fitzgerald's crew and a failure to take action in the minutes leading up to the collision, two unnamed US defense officials told CNN.

A US Navy official said, off the record, that since the warship had sovereign immunity, the US Navy would not allow crew members of Fitzgerald to be interviewed by officials from other countries. The United States Coast Guard is instead expected to provide summaries to the Japan Transport Safety Board (JTSB), which will share them with local investigators.

On 17 August 2017, Vice Chief of Naval Operations Admiral William Moran announced that Commander Bryce Benson, Executive Officer Commander Sean Babbitt and Ship Command Master Chief Petty Officer Brice Baldwin are to be relieved of shipboard duty, and close to a dozen other sailors will receive non-judicial punishment. Moran stated that "serious mistakes" were made by the "bridge team" (those conducting safety watch on board the ship's bridge) which caused them to lose "situational awareness," thus rendering it impossible to avoid the collision even after the container ship had already been sighted. Benson was relieved of duty at an Admiral's Mast conducted by Vice Admiral Joseph Aucoin, after which Benson was allowed to travel to the United States to receive advanced medical care for the brain trauma inflicted by the collision.

On 21 August 2017, the USS John S. McCain (DDG-56) collided with the Liberian-flagged tanker Alnic MC off the coast of Singapore and Malaysia, killing 10 US sailors. This ship is a sister ship to the Fitzgerald, operated in the same squadron (Destroyer Squadron 15), and had the same home port of Yokosuka, Japan.

On 23 August 2017, commander of the US Seventh Fleet, Vice Admiral Joseph Aucoin, was relieved from his duties a few weeks before his planned retirement date following four collisions within a year involving Seventh Fleet warships. On 18 September 2017, the new commander of the US Seventh Fleet, Vice Admiral Phillip Sawyer, as part of the investigations into four surface ship incidents involving Navy ships in the Western Pacific in 2017, including the collision involving Fitzgerald, ordered that Rear Admiral Charles Williams, Commander, Task Force 70 (CTF 70)/Carrier Strike Group 5, and Captain Jeffrey Bennett, commodore of Destroyer Squadron 15, be removed from their positions due to a loss of confidence in their ability to command.

On 16 January 2018, the Navy announced that hearings would be convened to consider bringing criminal charges of dereliction of duty resulting in death, hazarding a vessel and negligent homicide against Commander Bryce Benson and three junior officers on duty at the time of the collision. Non-judicial administrative punishment actions were in progress against four additional Fitzgerald crew members.

On 8 May 2018, the US Navy commenced court proceedings for four of the destroyer's officers. Junior officer LTJG Sarah Coppock pleaded guilty to a single criminal charge of "dereliction in the performance of duties through neglect contributing to the deaths" for her role in the collision. Coppock was the officer of the deck when Fitzgerald collided with ACX Crystal. As part of a plea arrangement, Coppock was sentenced to receive a letter of reprimand and three months of half-pay. During the court proceedings, it was revealed that the radar aboard the ship was not functioning properly at the time of the collision.

In August 2019, Admiral Bill Galinis, who oversees U.S. Navy ship design, said the touchscreen-based control systems were "overly complex" because shipbuilders had little guidance on how they should work, so sailors were not sure where key indicators could be found on the screen; this confusion contributed to the collision. The Navy is planning to replace all touchscreens with wheels and throttles on all of its ships, starting in mid-2020.

In August 2019, the Japan Transport Safety Board's final report concluded distraction and incomplete radar information aboard the US Navy vessel caused the accident.

After a long legal battle, the Navy dropped charges of homicide and other crimes against ship commander Commander Bryce Benson in 2019. This prompted the Secretary of the Navy, Richard V. Spencer, to publicly censure Benson, prompting a Naval Board of Inquiry to be convened to investigate his misconduct and jeopardizing his retirement. The Navy decided against the Board of Inquiry, instead allowing him to retire as a Commander on 29 December 2019 and keep his medical benefits.

=== Findings against Crystal ===
Investigations also found that Crystal was operating on autopilot until shortly before the collision, and did not sound blasts or attempt radio communication with the Fitzgerald prior to the collision. The Crystal's duty officers did not take sufficient steps to detect the risk of, or attempt to avoid, a collision. The owners of the Crystal agreed to pay nearly $27 million in damages to the U.S. government.

=== Suit against NYK ===
The estates of the Fitzgerald sailors killed in the collision and the sailors who were injured sued NYK in Federal court in Louisiana but their cases were dismissed because NYK was not subject to the jurisdiction of American courts.

== Ships involved ==
=== USS Fitzgerald ===
Fitzgerald is a Flight I Arleigh Burke-class destroyer. Built at Bath Iron Works in Maine, US. The ship was commissioned into the US Navy on 14 October 1995. Since September 2004, Fitzgerald has operated from the US Yokosuka base in Japan, as part of Destroyer Squadron 15 attached to Carrier Strike Group 5, a unit of the US Seventh Fleet.

=== MV ACX Crystal ===
ACX Crystal is a container ship owned by the Olympic Steamship Co SA, Panama. Built by STX Offshore & Shipbuilding at Changwon, South Korea, the ship entered service in August 2008. ACX Crystal has been employed for use by ACX, a subsidiary of NYK Line, on shipping routes between Japan, Vietnam, and Thailand.

== See also ==
- HNoMS Helge Ingstad – Fridtjof Nansen-class frigate of the Royal Norwegian Navy collision with oil tanker − 2018
- HMAS Melbourne and HMAS Voyager collision – 1964 collision between two Royal Australian Navy warships in Jervis Bay, Australia
- HMAS Melbourne and USS Evans collision – 1969 ship collision in the South China Sea
- USS Porter and MV Otowasan collision – Arleigh Burke-class destroyer − 2012
- USS John S. McCain and Alnic MC collision – 2017 maritime accident
- US–Japan Status of Forces Agreement – 1960 agreement between Japan and the United States
