= USS Dewey (DDG-105) =

Guided missile destroyer in the United States Navy

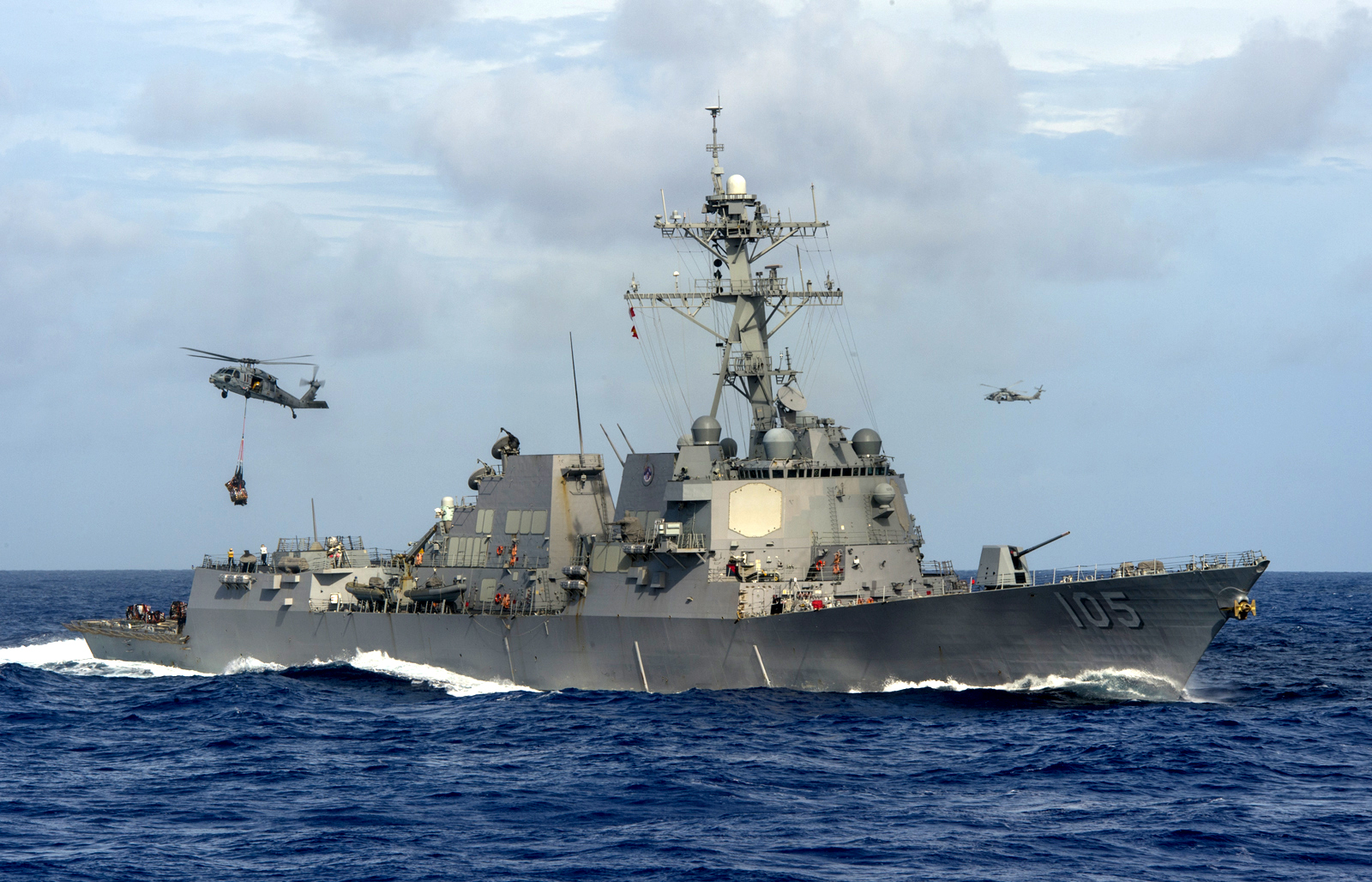
- USS Dewey on 24 September 2014

History

United States
- Name: Dewey
- Namesake: George Dewey
- Ordered: 13 September 2002
- Builder: Ingalls Shipbuilding
- Laid down: 4 October 2006
- Launched: 26 January 2008
- Commissioned: 6 March 2010
- Home port: Yokosuka
- Identification: MMSI number: 382933000; Hull number: DDG-105
- Motto: Dynamis Ex Cardias; (The Will to Fight from the Heart)
- Honors and awards: See Awards
- Status: in active service
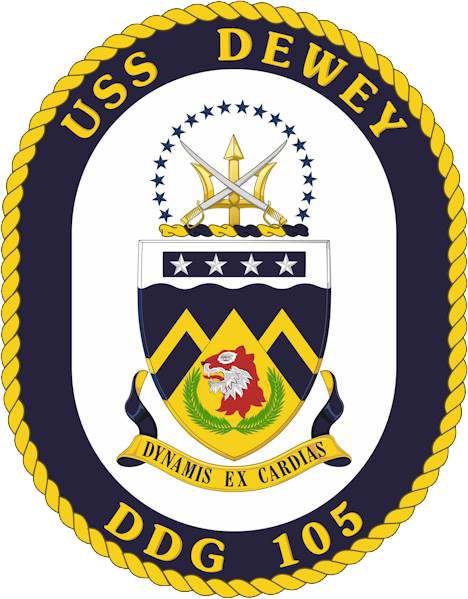
- Badge

General characteristics
- Class & type: Arleigh Burke-class destroyer
- Displacement: 9,200 tons
- Length: 509 ft 6 in (155.30 m)
- Beam: 66 ft (20 m)
- Draft: 31 ft (9.4 m)
- Propulsion: 4 × General Electric LM2500-30 gas turbines, 2 shafts, 100,000 shp (75 MW)
- Speed: 30+ knots (55+ km/h)
- Complement: 380 officers and enlisted
- Armament: Guns: 1 × 5-inch (127 mm)/62 mk 45 mod 4 (lightweight gun); 1 × 20 mm (0.8 in) Phalanx CIWS; 2 × 25 mm (0.98 in) Mk 38 machine gun system; 4 × 0.50 inches (12.7 mm) caliber guns; Lasers: Optical Dazzling Interdictor, Navy (ODIN); Missiles: 1 × 32-cell, 1 × 64-cell (96 total cells) Mk 41 vertical launching system (VLS): RIM-66M surface-to-air missile; RIM-156 surface-to-air missile; RIM-174A standard ERAM; RIM-161 anti-ballistic missile; RIM-162 ESSM (quad-packed); BGM-109 Tomahawk cruise missile; RUM-139 vertical launch ASROC; Torpedoes: 2 × Mark 32 triple torpedo tubes: Mark 46 lightweight torpedo; Mark 50 lightweight torpedo; Mark 54 lightweight torpedo
- Aircraft carried: 2 × MH-60R Seahawk helicopters

USS Dewey (DDG-105) is an Arleigh Burke-class (Flight IIA) Aegis guided missile destroyer in the United States Navy. Dewey is the third Navy ship named after Admiral of the Navy George Dewey, hero of the Battle of Manila Bay during the Spanish–American War.

The ship is part of Destroyer Squadron 15 of the George Washington Carrier Strike Group.

== History ==
She was authorized on 13 September 2002 and was built by Northrop Grumman Ship Systems. The keel was laid down on 4 October 2006 at the company's shipyard in Pascagoula, Mississippi. On 26 January 2008, Dewey was christened in a ceremony in Pascagoula, by Deborah Mullen, the wife of Admiral Mike Mullen. Dewey was commissioned in Seal Beach, California on 6 March 2010, as the 55th Arleigh Burke-class destroyer. This is the first ship commissioning for the City of Seal Beach.

The First 72 Hours (2013) (11:22)
2013 documentary short film showing daily life as a sailor aboard USS Dewey.

In April 2013, Dewey was outfitted with a Laser Weapon System (LaWS). This is an experimental weapon which can be used to disable small boats and drones.

On 26 May 2017, Dewey carried out a "freedom of navigation operation" (FONOP) in waters claimed by China in the South China Sea. According to Chinese sources, Dewey was "warned and expelled" from Chinese waters near the Nansha Islands in the South China Sea. According to the US Navy, the FONOP proceeded as planned by peacefully transiting the area, despite verbal challenges and approaches by Chinese vessels.

On 16 June 2017, Dewey got underway to assist USS Fitzgerald after a collision with the Japanese-owned (NYK Line) Philippine-flagged container ship ACX Crystal. On 4 September 2017, she deployed to the Port of Los Angeles as part of the 2017 fleet week activities. In October 2017, Dewey spilled oil near the Tijuana River.

In November 2019, the Optical Dazzling Interdictor laser weapon was installed on Dewey. She was the first ship to receive the new weapons system.

The ship participated in Exercise Malabar 2024 which was held from 8 to 18 October.

=== Deployments ===
- 29 July 2011 – 27 February 2012 Maiden deployment
- 22 August 2014 – 4 June 2015 West Pac-Indian Ocean-Persian Gulf
- 31 March 2017 – 31 July 2017 Western Pacific
- 6 February 2018 – 11 May 2018 Western Pacific

== Awards ==
- Navy Unit Commendation - (Sep 2011–Jan 2012, Jul 2012–May 2013)
- Battle "E" - (2018, 2019, 2022, 2023)
- Spokane Trophy Award - (2018)
