= William Charles Fitzgerald =

Recipient of the Purple Heart medal (1938–1967)

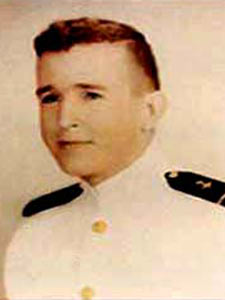
- Fitzgerald as a midshipman
- Born: January 28, 1938; Montpelier, Vermont, U.S.
- Died: August 7, 1967 (aged 29); Co Luy, South Vietnam
- Burial place: Berlin Corner Cemetery, Berlin, Vermont
- Military career
- Allegiance: United States
- Branch: United States Navy
- Service years: 1956–1967
- Rank: Lieutenant
- Nickname: Bill
- Units: USS Charles H. Roan (DD-853); 16th RVN Coastal Group, Naval Advisory Group
- Conflicts: Vietnam War †
- Awards: Navy Cross; Purple Heart; National Defense Service Medal; Vietnam Service Medal; Republic of Vietnam Campaign ribbon bar
- Other work: USS Fitzgerald is named in his honor.

William "Bill" C. Fitzgerald (January 28, 1938 – August 7, 1967) was a United States Navy officer who was killed in action during the Vietnam War while serving as an advisor to the Republic of Vietnam Navy. He received the Navy Cross posthumously for his role in fighting off a Viet Cong attack.

== Early life and Navy enlisted service ==
Fitzgerald was born in Montpelier, Vermont, the second child and first son of Louis and Mildred Mary Fitzgerald. His father was a career Navy man who retired as a Chief Petty Officer. Fitzgerald grew up in the local area and graduated from Montpelier High School in June 1956.

Following graduation, he followed in his father's footsteps and enlisted in the United States Navy. As an enlisted sailor, Fitzgerald served on USS Samuel B. Roberts (DD-823), USS Hugh Purvis, and USS Gearing. Fitzgerald also served with Utility Squadron Six (VC-6) at NAS Norfolk, Virginia, while working on the Drone Anti-Submarine Helicopter (DASH) program.

== U.S. Naval Academy studies ==
Seaman Fitzgerald eventually earned selection for officer training by appointment to the United States Naval Academy at Annapolis, Maryland with the Class of 1963.

Fitzgerald excelled in naval education, softball, football, fencing, basketball, and tennis.

== Service as a commissioned officer ==
Midshipman Fitzgerald graduated and was commissioned in the United States Navy on June 5, 1963. He then reported to the destroyer USS Charles H. Roan, where he rose from "boot ensign" to weapons department head.

=== Vietnam service ===
Following Roan, Lieutenant Fitzgerald reported to Naval Amphibious Base Coronado, California, where he attended counterinsurgency training. Upon completion he was assigned duties as the senior U.S. advisor at Coastal Defense Group Sixteen in Vietnam. This group's compound was located adjacent to the village of Co Luy, near the delta of the Tra Khuc River, and about 70 miles southeast of Da Nang. In this position, he advised the Republic of Vietnam Navy on defense measures and on the capture of military supplies and contraband destined for Viet Cong forces.

At about 0300 on August 7, 1967, Coastal Defense Group Sixteen's compound came under heavy attack by two Viet Cong battalions. The assault began with an intense mortar barrage followed immediately by the advance of troops. Fitzgerald, the senior American commander, immediately ordered a retreat of the civilians within the compound. Because of the compound's location adjacent to a river and the aggressors' position, the only escape route was via water in small boats.

Lieutenant Fitzgerald and three others delayed their retreat as long as possible in order to provide covering fire and to direct fire from surrounding friendly forces. Many calls were made to orbiting gunship aircraft, artillery units, and Fast Patrol Craft to provide defensive fire. The Viet Cong attack, however, was swift and well coordinated. It soon became apparent that the South Vietnamese forces were decimated and that the American bunker was the sole remaining source of resistance. As the situation deteriorated, Fitzgerald ordered his last three remaining defenders to retreat while he used arms fire to cover their escape. Fitzgerald was mortally wounded in this action.

== Awards and legacy ==
In honor of Fitzgerald's service, he was posthumously awarded the U. S. Navy's second-highest decoration for valor, the Navy Cross. Additionally, he was awarded the Purple Heart, Combat Action Ribbon, National Defense Service Medal, Vietnam Service Medal, and the Republic of Vietnam Campaign.

=== Navy Cross Citation ===

The President of the United States of America takes pride in presenting the Navy Cross (Posthumously) to Lieutenant William Charles Fitzgerald (NSN: 0-669041), United States Navy, for extraordinary heroism on 7 August 1967 while serving as Senior Advisor to Vietnamese Navy Coastal Group SIXTEEN in connection with combat operations against the communist insurgents (Viet Cong) in the Republic of Vietnam. When Coastal Group 16 was taken under a coordinated attack by numerically superior Viet Cong forces, Lieutenant Fitzgerald immediately established communications with the Vietnamese Navy commanding officer, and attempted to coordinate assistance with free-world forces in the area. The enemy fire soon became too intense for the outnumbered base defense force to resist successfully and the Viet Cong completely overran the base. Aware that his bunker was the only remaining source of resistance, Lieutenant Fitzgerald requested an artillery barrage to be laid down on his own position and ordered his men to evacuate the base toward the river. He gallantly remained in the command bunker in order to provide cover fire for the evacuating personnel. Before Lieutenant Fitzgerald could carry out his own escape, he was fatally shot by the Viet Cong aggressors. By his fearless dedication to duty, courage under fire, and heroic actions in defense of the base, despite overwhelming odds, Lieutenant Fitzgerald served as an inspiration to all persons engaged in the counterinsurgency effort in Vietnam and upheld the highest traditions of the United States Naval Service.

Fitzgerald was survived by his wife Betty Ann, and their children who continued to reside in and around Montpelier, Vermont.

== Namesake ==
The United States Navy ship USS Fitzgerald (DDG-62) is named in his honor and was sponsored by his wife.

== See also ==
- USS Fitzgerald
- William Fitzgerald at USNA Memorial Hall
