= HNoMS Helge Ingstad =

Fridtjof Nansen-class frigate of the Royal Norwegian Navy

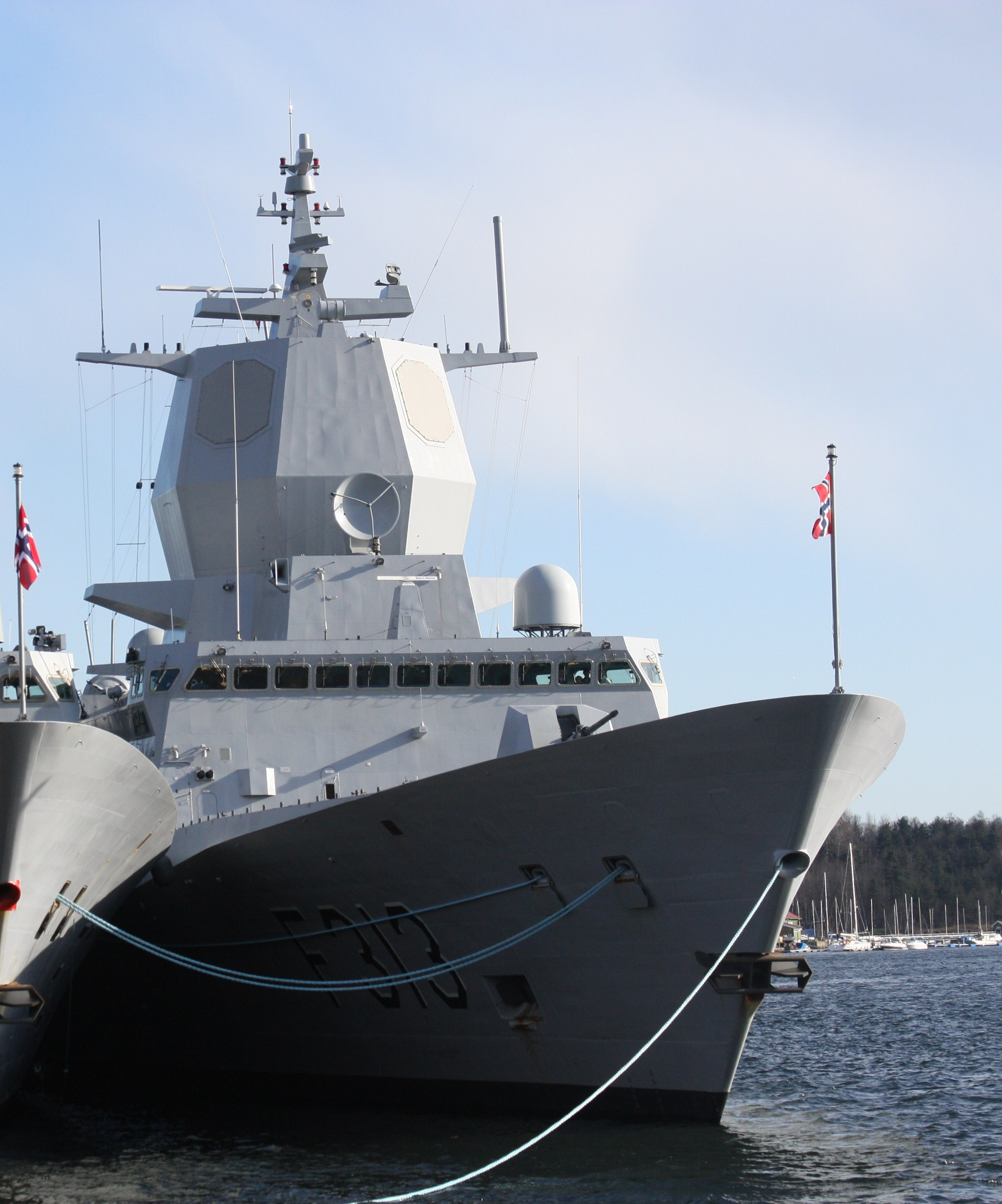
- Helge Ingstad in 2010

History

Norway
- Name: Helge Ingstad
- Namesake: Norwegian explorer Helge Ingstad
- Ordered: 23 June 2000
- Builder: Navantia, Ferrol
- Laid down: 28 April 2006
- Launched: 23 November 2007
- Commissioned: 29 September 2009
- Decommissioned: 24 June 2019
- Stricken: 13 November 2018
- Identification: Pennant number: F313; MMSI number: 259044000; Callsign: LABI
- Fate: Sold for scrap
- Badge

General characteristics
- Class & type: Fridtjof Nansen-class frigate
- Displacement: 5,290 long tons (5,370 t)
- Length: 133.2 m (437 ft 0 in)
- Beam: 16.8 m (55 ft 1 in)
- Draft: 7.6 m (24 ft 11 in)
- Propulsion: Combined diesel and gas turbine (CODAG); Two BAZAN BRAVO 12V 4.5 MW diesel engines for cruising; One GE LM2500 21.5 MW gas turbine for high speed running; MAAG gearboxes; Two shafts driving controllable pitch propellers; Bow Thruster Retractable (Electric)1 MW Brunvoll; Diesel Generators 4 × MTU 396 Serie 12V 1250 KVA
- Speed: 26 knots (48 km/h)
- Range: 4,500 nautical miles (8,300 km)
- Complement: 120, accommodations for 146; Lockheed Martin AN/SPY-1F 3-D multifunction radar; Reutech RSR 210N air/sea surveillance radar; Sagem Vigy 20 Electro Optical Director; MRS 2000 hull mounted sonar; Captas MK II V1 active/passive towed sonar; 2 × Mark 82 fire-control radar
- Electronic warfare & decoys: Terma DL-12T decoy launcher, Loki torpedo countermeasure
- Armament: 8-cell Mk41 VLS for 32 × RIM-162 ESSM; 8 × Naval Strike Missile SSMs; 4 × torpedo tubes for Sting Ray torpedoes; Depth charges; 1 × 76 mm OTO Melara Super Rapid gun; 4 × 12.7 mm Browning M2HB HMG; 4 × Protector (RWS) ( Sea PROTECTOR ); 2 × LRAD Long Range Acoustic Device
- Aircraft carried: 1 × NH90 helicopter

HNoMS Helge Ingstad was a Fridtjof Nansen-class frigate of the Royal Norwegian Navy. The vessel was ordered on 23 June 2000 and constructed by Navantia in Spain. The ship was launched on 23 November 2007 and commissioned on 29 November 2009. Named for Helge Ingstad, a Norwegian explorer, the Fridtjof Nansen class are capable of anti-air, anti-submarine and surface warfare.

On 8 November 2018, HNoMS Helge Ingstad was operating with NATO's SNMG1 when it collided with the Maltese-flagged tanker Sola TS in Norwegian waters just outside Sture Terminal. Helge Ingstad was severely damaged in the collision and had to be deliberately run aground to prevent her sinking. On 13 November 2018, the ship sank where she had run aground and became a constructive total loss.

She was raised in a salvage operation from 27 February 2019 to 3 March 2019. In June 2019 after it was deemed uneconomical to repair her, it was decided that she would be scrapped.

== Design and description ==
The design of the Fridtjof Nansen-class frigates began in 1997. Based on the Alvaro de Bazan-class design, Izar (later Navantia) of Spain and Lockheed Martin were chosen to construct the vessel. The class is designed for operational flexibility with each ship capable of anti-air, anti-submarine and surface warfare. This was done to allow vessels of the class to operate with more ease in international operations. The Fridtjof Nansen-class frigates measure 133.2 m (437 ft 0 in) long overall with a beam of 16.8 m (55 ft 1 in) and a draught of 4.9 m (16 ft 1 in). The frigates have a standard displacement of 5,290 long tons (5,370 t).

The vessels have a complement of over 120 personnel.

=== Propulsion ===
The frigates are propelled by two controllable pitch propellers powered by a CODAG system with one GE LM2500 gas turbine rated at 26,112 hp (19,472 kW) and two Bazán Bravo 12V diesel engines rated at 12,240 hp (9,130 kW). This gives the frigates a maximum speed of 26 knots (48 km/h; 30 mph) and a range of 4,500 nautical miles (8,300 km; 5,200 mi) at 16 knots (30 km/h; 18 mph).

=== Weapons ===
The class are armed with an octuple launcher for Kongsberg Naval Strike Missiles for surface warfare. The launcher is located amidships, behind the forward superstructure. For anti-air warfare, the Fridtjof Nansens are equipped with an octuple American Mk 41 vertical launch system for 32 RIM-162 ESSM surface-to-air missiles located ahead of the forward superstructure and aft the single-mounted 76 mm (3 in) OTO Melara Super Rapid gun. The ships also mount two twin-mounted 324 mm (12.8 in) torpedo tubes for Sting Ray torpedoes, each mount slotted amidships on either side of the aft superstructure. The frigates also mount depth charges, four 12.7 mm (0.50 in) Browning M2HB heavy machine guns, four Protector (RWS) (Sea PROTECTOR) and two Long Range Acoustic Devices.

=== Sensors ===
For sensors, the frigates are equipped with a Lockheed Martin AN/SPY-1F 3-D multi-function radar, Reutech RSR 210N air/sea surveillance radar, Safran VIGY 20 electro-optical director, MRS 2000 hull-mounted sonar, Captas MK II V1 active/passive towed sonar and two Mark 82 fire-control radar. The Fridtjof Nansen class use the Aegis combat system and Link 11 and is fitted for Link 16/22 combat data systems. For signal defence, the class operates the Terma DL-12T decoy launcher and Loki torpedo countermeasure systems.

== Construction and service ==
The ship was ordered for construction on 23 June 2000 by Norway and built by the Spanish shipbuilders Navantia at Ferrol, Spain. The vessel was the fourth of the Fridtjof Nansen class to be constructed, and was laid down on 28 April 2006. Construction had been delayed by disputes over quality control. The frigate was launched on 23 November 2007 and named for the Norwegian explorer Helge Ingstad. Helge Ingstad was commissioned in the Royal Norwegian Navy on 29 September 2009.

From December 2013 to May 2014, Helge Ingstad was one of the escort ships for merchant vessels carrying chemical weapons from Syria to be destroyed. In August 2017, she joined Exercise Saxon Warrior off the coast of Scotland, escorting the aircraft carriers HMS Queen Elizabeth of the Royal Navy and USS George H. W. Bush of the United States Navy.

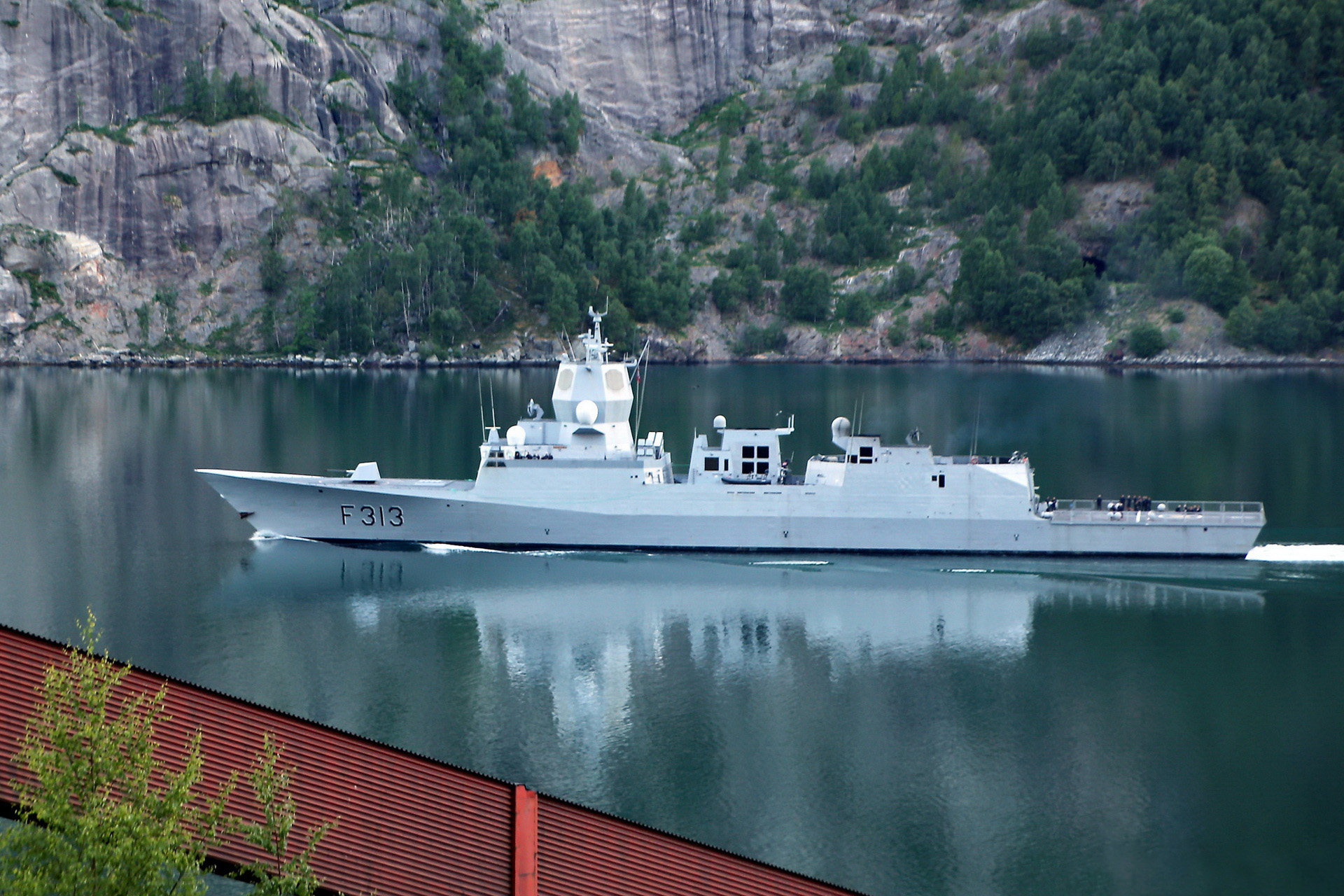
Helge Ingstad in Norway's Sørfjord in June 2018

=== Collision with oil tanker ===
On 8 November 2018, while returning from a NATO exercise, she was navigating inshore waters north of Bergen at speeds of up to 17.4 knots (32.2 km/h; 20.0 mph). Starting from around 03:40 there was a watch handover on board Helge Ingstad, during which three oncoming vessels were noted. After radio communication was established, and upon being asked to alter course to starboard, to avoid the 250-metre (820 ft), 112,939 t, Maltese-flagged oil tanker Sola TS, escorted by VSP Tenax, which had just left its berth, Helge Ingstad believed the vessel calling them to be one of the oncoming vessels they were tracking on radar. Assuming the tanker, slow moving and with its bright deck lights obscuring its navigation lights, to be part of the shore installation, the frigate intended to pass it before altering course moving near her starboard channel margin. By the time they realised their error they were within 400 metres (440 yd) of Sola TS and it was too late to avoid a collision. Preben Østheim, the ship's commanding officer, stated that he was asleep in his cabin when the collision happened, and was in fact awakened by the collision.

The collision caused severe damage to Helge Ingstad, which lost control of engine and steering, with a large breach along her side from the starboard torpedo launchers to the stern. The vessel grounded and continued to take on water, through the propeller shaft and stuffing boxes. Seven sailors were injured in the incident. By late morning she had developed a severe list to starboard with most of the stern submerged. Inadequate damage control efforts like leaving open water tight doors led to the vessel sinking in the early hours of 13 November, with only small sections of the superstructure remaining above water. A possible design flaw at Navantia was dismissed, as the accident report pointed to a succession of human failures. This was the first incident of such scale in the Royal Norwegian Navy since 1994, when HNoMS Oslo was lost after it ran aground.

Norwegian defence department's report found that 53 of 88 rules and "barriers" meant to avoid collisions were violated by the Helge Ingstad in this case. In addition, they found that the crew on the bridge had little experience.

Unlike Helge Ingstad, Sola TS only suffered minor damage to its front and was never in danger of sinking. She was able to continue to her destination after the incident. The tanker subsequently sailed to a shipyard in Gdańsk for repairs and was back in regular service by late December 2018.

Following the frigate's sinking, a local fish farming company, which had had to move trout worth 40 million kroner from the area due to spill of diesel oil from the vessel, claimed one million kroner (US$ 116,000) in damages from the Ministry of Defence.

== Salvage operation ==
After the Helge Ingstad was evacuated, other vessels were used to prevent it from slipping back into the water. By 9 November 2018 thick cable wires were used to anchor the hull to the shore to prevent it from sinking into the water.

Subsequently, on 13 November 2018 Rear Admiral Nils Andreas Stensoenes, head of Norway's navy announced that the wires had snapped overnight. Apart from the main mast most of the ship was under water.

The Norwegian Navy inspected Helge Ingstad; the Norwegian Blueye Pioneer underwater drone was used. Poor weather hampered salvage operations through December 2018; with the planned date to raise the ship being delayed until late January 2019.

The lifting operation began on 26 February 2019. On 27 February 2019, due to weather concerns, the partially raised ship was moved to a location which is better protected from the elements, where further salvage work took place. The ship and the two heavy lift vessels (Rambiz and Gulliver) reached the Semco Maritime yard at Hanøytangen on 28 February 2019. Boarding parties consisting of some 300 people, including around 100 members of Helge Ingstad's original crew, assisted in pumping out the remaining water so that the ship could be placed on a barge and fully salvaged. Helge Ingstad was successfully placed on Boa barge 33 on 2 March 2019 and arrived at the Haakonsvern naval base on 3 March 2019, for removal of spare parts and sensitive equipment.

On 14 May 2019 it was reported the cost of repairing Helge Ingstad would exceed US$1.4 billion, according to the Norwegian Armed Forces, implying that it would be nearly three times cheaper to build a new ship. However, restarting production for just one ship could result in a disproportionally high per-ship cost. In January 2021, the Norwegian government signed a 60 million kr (almost $7 million) contract with Norscrap West for the ship's scrapping. The scrapping process was used to learn how to scrap the other Fridtjof Nansen-class vessels in the future.

=== Investigation, fine for the Ministry of Defence; damages paid to the ministry ===
The Norwegian Safety Investigation Authority (NSIA) and the Defence Accident Investigation Board Norway (DAIBN) immediately began a joint investigation, with the involvement of the Marine Safety Investigation Unit of Malta. On 29 November 2018 the AIBN published their preliminary accident report together with two interim safety recommendations. It recommended that the Norwegian military authorities investigate the findings of the preliminary report with a view to implementing any necessary safety measures, and that the shipbuilder Navantia investigate relevant aspects of the design of the frigate and whether other ships might be similarly affected. The watertight condition of the ship was supposedly guaranteed by the 13 watertight bulkheads. Seven compartments were damaged as a result of the collision but initially the ship remained afloat. No one intervened to break the chain of errors. If the commander had observed International Regulations for Preventing Collisions at Sea (COLREGS) the collision would not have occurred.

The second accident report by the Norwegian Safety Investigation Authority (Statens Havarikommisjon) delivered on the 21 April 2021 did exonerate Navantia: the ship suffered damage "above that for which it was designed", and did not make any recommendations for the ship builder. The report mentioned that "If the crew had been better trained, they would have had a better understanding of how to save the ship", and "They didn't understand that various systems were still functioning", noting that the crew evacuated the ship without closing doors, hatches, and other openings that would have maintained stability and buoyancy, avoiding the capsizing and sinking of the vessel, and saving the ship from total loss.

The Ministry of Defence has accepted paying a fine of ten million Norwegian kroner.

In 2022, compensation was paid to the Ministry of Defence as part of a settlement agreement; Norwegian kroner 235 million were paid by the owner (Twitt Navigation), of the tanker.

== Trials in lower court and appellate court ==
Charges were filed in May 2022, and the court case started in January 2023, in a lower court. The defendant is the conning officer—also referred to as officer of the watch (vaktleder)—at the time of the accident.

The defendant testified in court that he entered the bridge, and proceeded to the map room. He and the officer he was about to relieve had discussed an object that had an "AIS marking that could not be determined"; the tanker had two tugboats near it, therefore the AIS marking [as perceived from a display] was not recognized as anything, except a stationary object, perhaps an oil platform. When the defendant took the conn at 03.53, he gave the entire bridge team (or crew) a status report: three approaching vessels ahead on the port side, and an illuminated stationary object on the starboard side; he added "Notify me if there is any change [on that situation or] regarding that picture"; he testified, at that point the others on the bridge could have given feedback if they had a different opinion; he never got any indication from the others on the bridge that the object had left the pier.

"One of us [on the bridge]" commented that it might be a [ platform or] an installation for fish farming. The conning officer did not use the radar display to observe the object, and he did not order anyone else to do so. The starboard lookout had returned to the bridge at 03.59 (two minutes before the collision); that lookout had not been replaced on the bridge, while the lookout was on a break (a "food-break"). Testimony in court, said that the helmsman recognized the object as a [maritime] vessel, however he was not asked (while on the bridge); he thought the defendant had the same perception about the (oncoming) vessel. The defendant was during his watch, also giving instruction to a female U.S. Navy officer that was on the bridge; she was there as part of her (potential) qualifying for "Officer of the Watch"; furthermore, having to train anyone, is "an element that does distract", he added. Furthermore, the defendant was asked about four of the bridge team members having impaired vision (nedsatt syn) - two of those persons did not fulfill the criteria for such duties, because of their (impaired) vision: The defendant had known nothing about that matter (at the time of the accident).

A new witness at the trial, was the officer of the watch, who the defendant had relieved (on the bridge); That witness said that during the handover of the watch, he and the defendant discussed what the lights were: "Were they (from) fish farming? Or an offshore installation?"; The witness said that they did not think that the lights were from a vessel; The witness did not think that fish farming would be located that close to Stureterminalen. At 03.45, the tanker broadcast on VHF radio, that it (the tanker, now) was departing Stureterminalen; the witness testified that he (the witness) was responsible for not having caught the message (on the specific channel that he was duty-bound to listen to, (while on duty) when the warship was in a specific area; he testified that if he (the witness) had done his duty by catching the radio transmission, then the (verbal) situation report that he passed on to the defendant, would have left no doubt that the tanker was in motion.

On 28 January 2023, media told about the content of a report, that has not been released to the public (but has been referred to, during the trial); That 42 page report tells about the Norwegian Navy's view of what happened on the tanker's bridge:

- They did not use radar in the correct manner - neither before nor after departure from Stureterminalen; the use was not in accordance with the International Regulations for Preventing Collisions at Sea.
- The actions of the lookouts, were not in accordance with instructions on board the tanker, or in accordance with the rules of the International Regulations for Preventing Collisions at Sea.
- Norwegian defence department's report found that 53 of 88 rules meant to avoid collisions were violated by the Helge Ingstad.
- The Norwegian Navy says that the bridge team of the tanker, made a total of 12 mistakes.

Later that month, the other bridge team members of the warship gave their testimony in court. The female U.S. Navy officer appeared through a video link, and the two lookouts testified in person. Both lookouts testified that the Officer of the Watch, who was the U.S. officer, had approved a short food break for them in the minutes before the accident.

Later that month, the warship's commanding officer testified. He was not on the bridge at the time of the accident; however, the bridge team had authority to operate the ship, during the periods when the captain is not on the bridge.

Witnesses also came on the stand in February, including the officer-of-the-watch of the warship's "operations room". Another witness, the trainee for the assistant officer-of-the-watch (bridge team member) testified that he was learning from her, the assistant officer-of-the-watch (bridge team member), while she was sitting in the chair in front of her radar display. Other witnesses that testified in court, were the pilot [that guided] the tanker; and the captain of a tugboat (Tenax) that was towing the tanker. The [traffic leader, or] trafikklederen at Sjøtrafikksentralens stasjon at Fedje, testified that he did not use the word "warning", while he (the traffic leader) had contact with the warship's bridge.

Another witness, the chief of training for the Navy, testified; he was responsible for the training and follow-up of those working with navigation on frigates. He disagreed with the [document], Havarikommisjonens rapport; that document says that prior to the accident, the Navy was qualifying personnel faster - because of a shortage of [qualified] personnel [to fill vacant positions]; the defendant got his clearances after eight months; the chief trainer said that from [some point in] the 1990s - and forward - the time needed for qualifying was between one and two years; perhaps around one person every year, was able to qualify in eight or nine months, because they were particularly proficient.

Another witness had been in charge of the [overall] operations of [all] the frigates in the Navy; as of 2023, Rune Andersen is the chief of the Navy.

Another witness had for 20 years, been responsible for running qualification checks on navigators in the Navy; the retired officer, Cato Rasmussen, has never heard of any other officer-of-the-watch getting qualified after only eight months of service; furthermore, on the [...day] of the accident, two of the navigators who belonged to the frigate, were on a one-year assignment in Bergen - at an [in-depth] navigation course. That created a need for developing new officers-of-the-watch - in a shorter time, than had been normal, earlier, according to Rasmussen.

The helmsman and the Norwegian Navy's foremost expert on navigation at sea (Stein Egil Iversen), are some of the more than 30 witnesses that have been scheduled to testify during the trial. However, on February 13, the prosecuting team asked that the judge throw out three of the expert witnesses (for the defense), that are scheduled to testify at some point; those witnesses are scheduled to testify for a total of four and a half hours. The trial lasted 8 weeks.

=== Verdict ===
The defendant was found guilty of negligence and sentenced to a 60-day suspended sentence by Hordaland District Court; one of the judges voted against the guilty verdict.

=== Trial in appellate court ===
In October 2023, the trial started in appellate court; it was scheduled to last four weeks, until 18. November; The lawyers for the defense team have called some new witnesses: a former chief of safety in the navy, and the person who was responsible for the training of the Officer of the watch (the defendant), and two researchers [... that are experts] in regard to naval accidents and near-accidents in the navy.

In 2023, the appellate court reaffirmed the sentence of the district court: the defendant received a suspended sentence of imprisonment of 60 days.

== See also ==
- HMAS Melbourne and HMAS Voyager collision – 1964 collision between two Royal Australian Navy warships in Jervis Bay, Australia
- HMAS Melbourne and USS Evans collision – 1969 ship collision in the South China Sea
- USS Porter and MV Otowasan collision – Arleigh Burke-class destroyer − 2012
- USS John S. McCain and Alnic MC collision – 2017 maritime accident
- USS Fitzgerald and MV ACX Crystal collision – 2017 maritime accident
