= Exercise Trident Juncture 2018 =

NATO-led military exercise in Norway in 2018

Trident Juncture 18
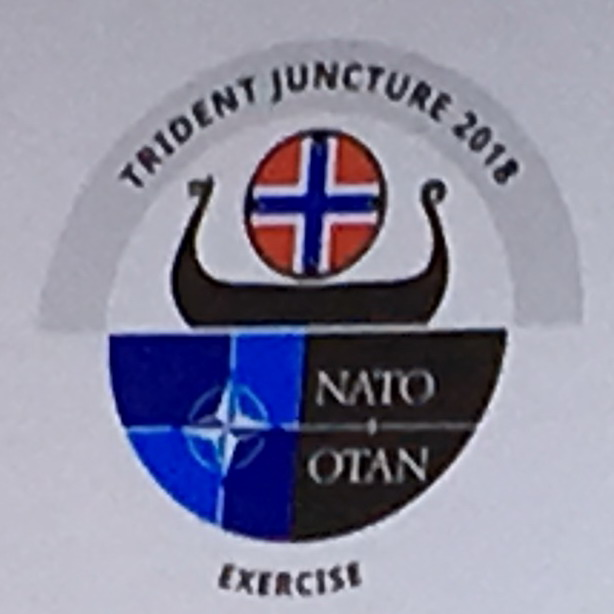
- Type: NATO multi-lateral joint forces exercises
- Location: NATO Northern Region: Central and eastern Norway, North Sea, Baltic Sea
- Planned by: Allied Joint Force Command Naples (JFC Naples)
- Objective: Deployment of NATO forces, train the NATO Response Force, winter training
- Date: 25 October–23 November 2018
- Executed by: Admiral James G. Foggo III, USN, Commander JFC Naples
- Casualties: 1 killed 7 injured

Trident Juncture 2018

Trident Juncture 18, abbreviated TRJE18, was a NATO-led military exercise held in Norway in October and November 2018 with an Article 5 collective defence scenario. The exercise was the largest of its kind in Norway since the 1980s. An expected 50,000 participants from 31 nations partook, including 10,000 vehicles, 250 aircraft and 65 vessels. The exercise was mainly held in the central and eastern parts of Norway, in addition to air and sea areas in Norway, Sweden and Finland. The stated goal of Trident Juncture was to train the NATO Response Force and to test the alliance's defence capability. According to the Norwegian Armed Forces, the exercise tested the country's ability to receive and handle allied support.

== Background ==
During the 2014 Wales NATO summit, the alliance decided to conduct several high-profile military exercises in the coming years. Exercise Trident Juncture was one of these exercises, and the first edition was held in Portugal and Spain in 2015. NATO also decided to conduct a second Trident Juncture, planned to be held in 2018. The Norwegian government offered to host the exercise, and NATO accepted Norway's offer in 2015. The main part of the exercises took place in the central and eastern parts of Norway, in the counties of Trøndelag, Hedmark and Oppland.

The Norwegian Armed Forces have called the exercise the largest held in Norway since the 1980s. It was NATO's largest exercise since 2002.

== Purpose ==
According to NATO, Trident Juncture was designed to test its ability to train and operate together, also in the northern parts of the NATO area. NATO also claims that it served to test the Alliance's ability to operate in cold weather and difficult terrain.

According to the Norwegian Armed Forces, the exercise tested the country's ability to receive and handle large numbers of troops and amounts of materiel and military equipment. They also claim that the exercises served as a test for Norway's total defence concept – the country's total military and civilian resources to be used in preventing and handling crisis and conflicts. The concept means that some civilian authorities like the health sector, Norwegian State Railways, Norwegian Public Roads Administration and the Norwegian Directorate for Civil Protection participate in hosting the allied troops during the exercise.

== The exercise ==
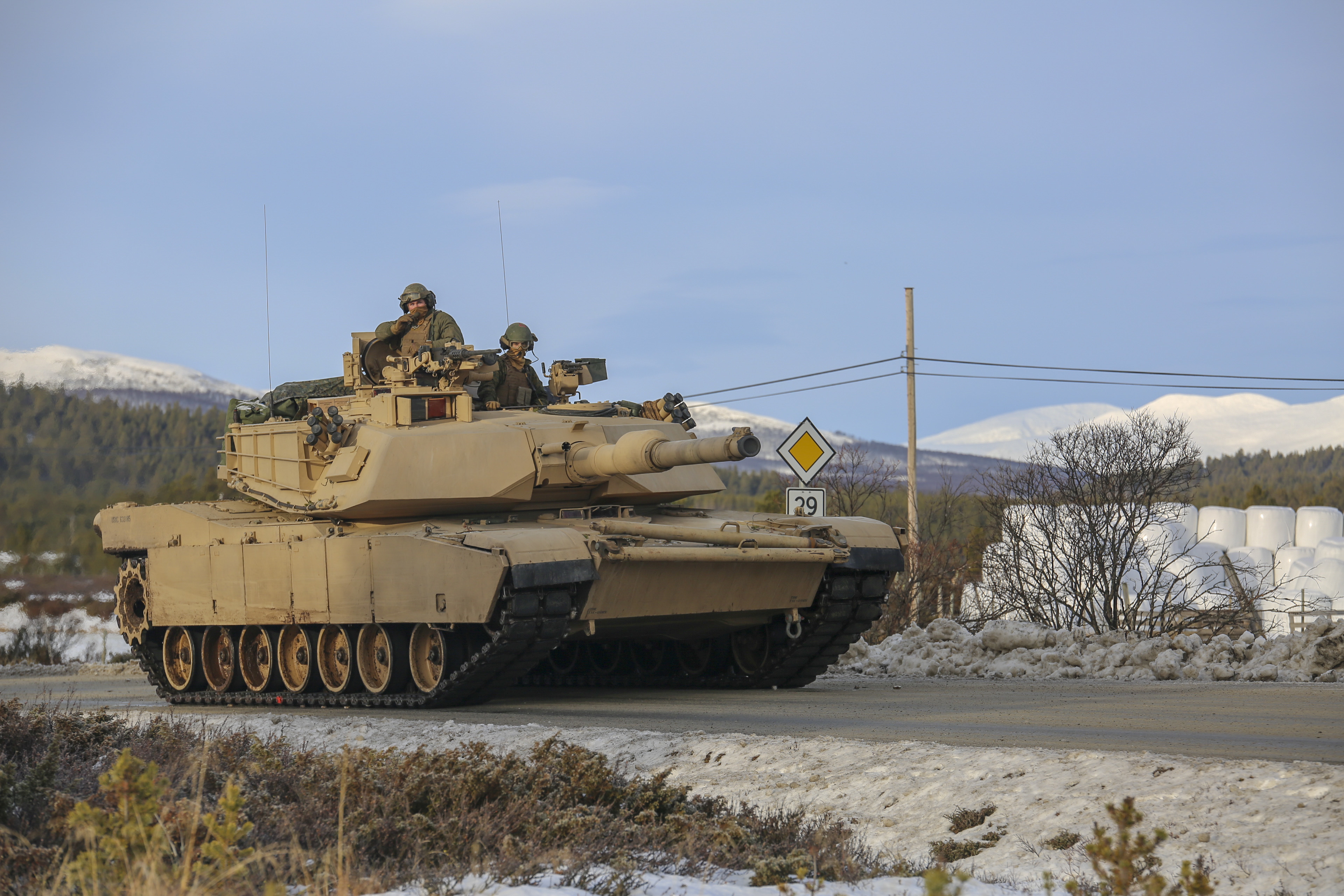
U.S. Marines M1A1 Abrams with 2nd Tank Battalion, 2nd Marine Division, advance on their eastern objective defended by opposing Spanish forces during Exercise Trident Juncture 18 near Dalholen, Norway, Nov. 3, 2018.

Trident Juncture 18 consisted of three main parts: a phase of deployment lasting from August to October, a live field exercise from 25 October to 7 November and a command post exercise from 13 to 24 November 2018.

The deployment started in August 2018, with personnel, equipment and military materiel arriving at 27 different points in Norway. From these arrival points, the material was transported to the training areas by rail and road. An estimated total of 180 flights and 60 ship loads were needed to transport all the exercise equipment to Norway. A total of 50 camps were established in and around the exercise area. Half of these had the capacity to quarter more than 500 people, the largest being able to house 5,500 people.

During the field exercise (LIVEX) from 25 October to 7 November the participants began training according to a scripted scenario. The land battle took place in the area south of Trondheim and north of Rena Camp in Hedmark County. There was also sea activity along the Norwegian coastline, the North Sea and limited areas in the Baltic Sea and Skagerrak. There was also air activity in the airspace over Norway, Sweden and Finland.

The command post exercise (CPX) lasted from 14 to 23 November 2018 at NATO's Joint Warfare Centre in Stavanger, Norway. This was a data simulated desk exercise to train the headquarters. This exercise also served as a certification test for Allied Joint Force Command Naples.

The exercise gathered around 51,000 participants from all NATO members and partner countries Sweden and Finland. An expected 250 aircraft, 65 vessels and 10,000 vehicles were shipped into the country.

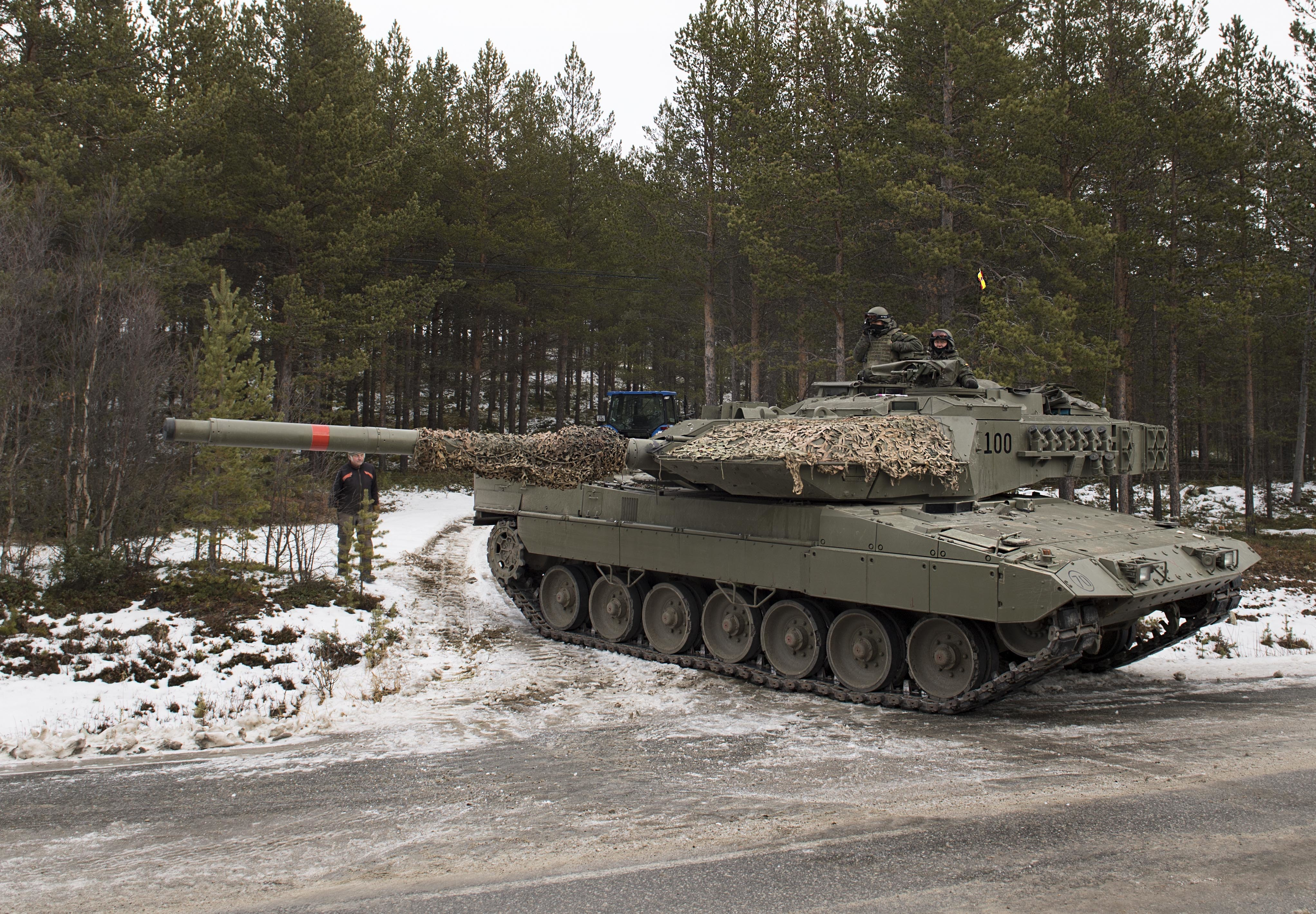
Spanish Leopard 2E participating in Exercise Trident Juncture 18 hold a defensive position against U.S. Marines with 2nd Tank Battalion, 2D Marine Division, near Folldal, Norway on Nov. 3, 2018. Trident Juncture 18 enhances the U.S. and NATO Allies’ and partners’ abilities to work together collectively to conduct military operations under challenging conditions.

According to the Norwegian Armed Forces, NATO and the Norwegian defence sector have signed contracts with Norwegian businesses at a total of 1.5 billion Norwegian kroner. This includes the establishment of 35,000 beds, 1.8 million meals to be served, 4.6 million bottles of water and 660,000 kilograms of laundry throughout the exercise.

== Incidents ==
Between the initial preparations and 7 November, NATO and the Norwegian Armed Services received 412 environmental damage incident reports and 51 complaints. Of these reports, 30 have been traffic collisions between military and civilian vehicles, with accidents occurring even after the peak of exercise's activities. The Norwegian Armed Forces stopped publishing figures on the complaints and damage reports on 7 November, despite the recurrence of other incidents and press coverage. Among these, several incidents have been notable enough to receive national media attention.

=== Disruption of local population ===
On 4 November 2018, NATO soldiers detained and handcuffed a 46-year old disabled man in Spillum while he was out walking. Soldiers have also been observed urinating and defecating close to public spaces, as well as in the proximity of kindergartens and schools. Despite complaints, most residents continued to be very positive regarding the NATO exercises.

Several residents in the areas where the exercises were carried out have complained about noise pollution due to increased military air traffic, including war veterans who have indicated that the exercises have caused flashbacks. Håkon Stenmark, a psychologist at the Center for Crisis Psychology in Trondheim, has reported that the exercises have caused unrest among patients in the center.

=== HNoMS Helge Ingstad sinking ===
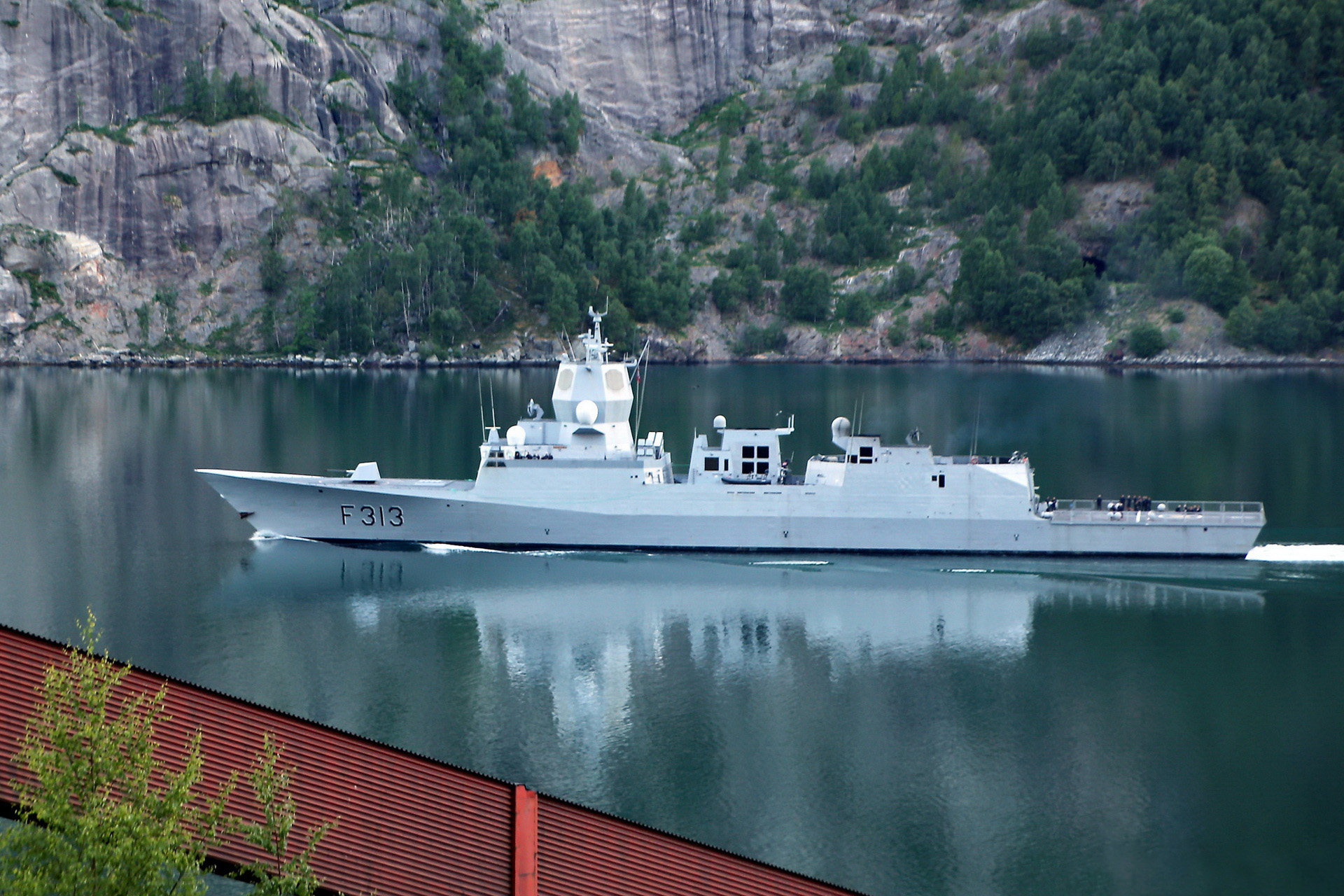
Helge Ingstad (F313) in Norway's Sørfjord in June 2018, a few months before the sinking.

On 8 November 2018, while returning from the exercise, the Norwegian frigate Helge Ingstad collided with the Maltese-flagged tanker Sola TS, and began taking in water, as well as leaking about 10 cubic metres (350 cu ft) of diesel. The ship was deliberately run aground in an attempt to prevent her sinking and allow for the evacuation of the crew. Seven sailors were injured in the incident and by late morning she had developed a severe angle of list to starboard side with most of the stern submerged.

== Public perception ==
Prior to the exercise, Kantar TNS conducted a survey among Norwegians on behalf of the Norwegian Armed Forces, in which 64% of respondents were positive towards NATO, while 65% of respondents viewed the exercises in Norway positively. Between November 6 and November 7, the survey was repeated with 69% of respondents answering positively towards NATO and 68% of respondents in favor of the exercises. Admiral Haakon Bruun-Hanssen was quoted saying he largely believed this was due to the professional behaviour of the soldiers during the exercise, and the positive interactions between the armed forces and civilian population. The complete results and methodology report of the study have not been made publicly available.

Although the Kantar survey has revealed an overall positive perception of NATO and Trident Juncture, the results have been mixed, with perceptions differing from region to region. In those counties where the exercises were held (Trøndelag, Hedmark, Oppland, and Møre og Romsdal), the percentage of respondents who had a positive opinion of NATO rose from 64 to 74%. However, in the same counties, public perception of the exercises declined; 68% of respondents surveyed were positive towards Trident Juncture prior to the exercises, while 64% responded positively in the second wave of the survey. Between the two surveys, the percentage of respondents that viewed the exercises negatively in those counties rose from 9 to 12%. Nationally, the number of respondents who viewed the exercises negatively rose from 8 to 11%.

Demonstrations against the exercises were held in Trondheim, Bergen, Oslo, and Kristiansand. Roughly 500 activists demonstrated in Trondheim on October 20, 2018. The following week, over 1000 people participated in protests in the remaining three cities.
