= Joseph Aucoin =

United States Navy officer

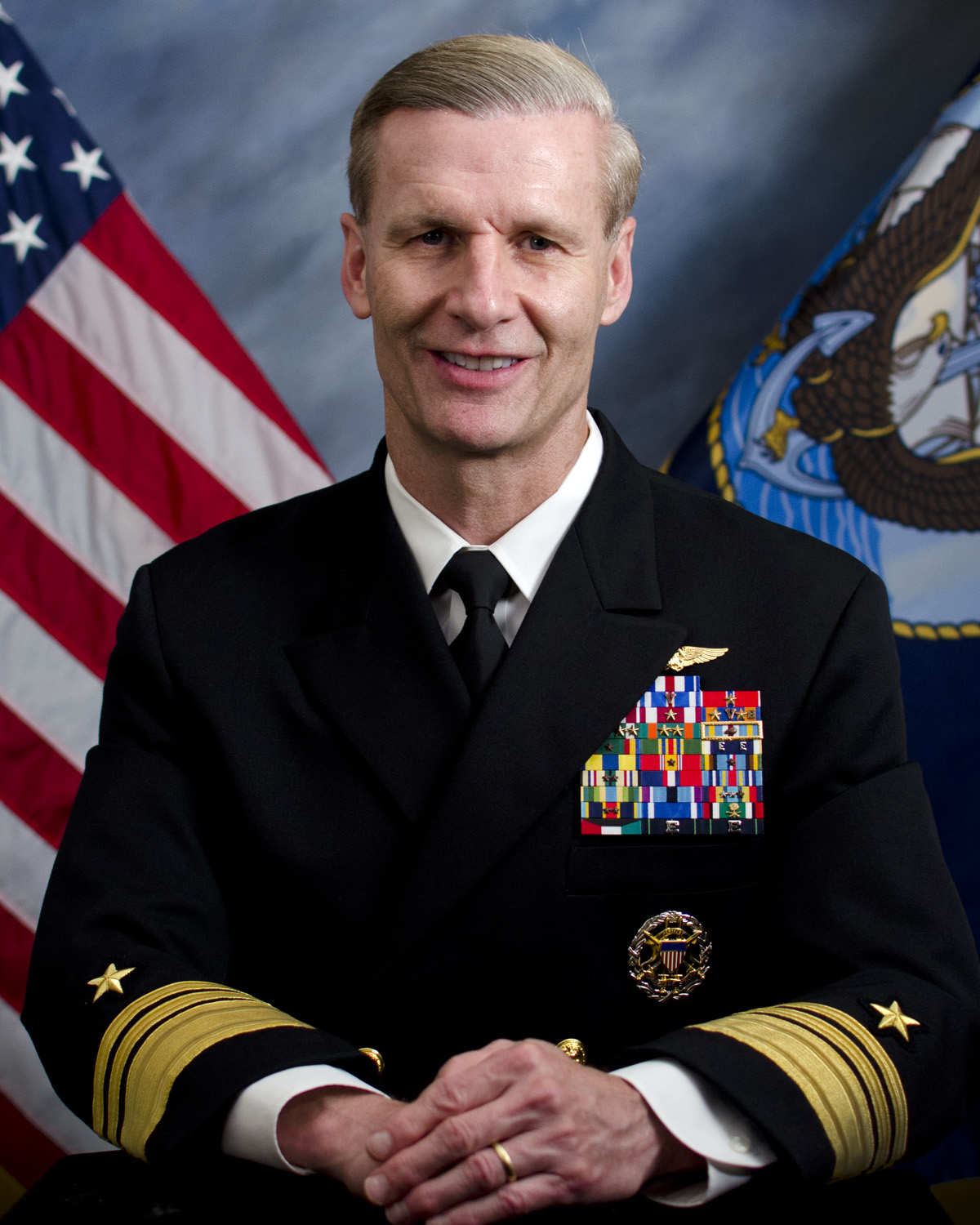
- Aucoin in 2013
- Born: April 25, 1957 (age 69)
- Spouse: Cassandra Aucoin
- Military career
- Allegiance: United States
- Branch: United States Navy
- Service years: 1980–2017
- Rank: Vice admiral
- Commands: United States Seventh Fleet

Joseph P. Aucoin (born April 25, 1957) is a retired officer of the United States Navy and former commander of the United States Seventh Fleet.

== Career ==
Vice Admiral Aucoin graduated from North Carolina State University with a Bachelor of Science in Electrical Engineering and received his commission through the University of North Carolina Naval Reserve Officers Training Corps program in 1980. He was designated a naval flight officer in 1981 and reported to Fighter Squadron 101 (VF-101) for initial training in the F-14 Tomcat.

He has served in five different Fleet and Fleet Replacement Squadron F-14 fighter squadrons, to include command of VF-41. He is a graduate of the Navy Fighter Weapons School (TOPGUN) and has also commanded Carrier Air Wing Five (CVW-5), Carrier Strike Group Three (CSG-3), and was Deputy Chief of Naval Operations for Warfare Systems before taking command of U.S. 7th Fleet.

He is also an Arthur S. Moreau Scholar and holds master's degrees in Public Administration from Harvard University and in National Security Studies and Strategic Affairs from the Naval War College.

Speaking at West 2017 Conference in February 2017, Aucoin stated, "If there's a fight tonight, it's probably going to happen on the Korean Peninsula."

Following a collision between the Seventh Fleet destroyer USS John S. McCain (DDG-56) and an oil tanker, the second such collision that resulted in fatalities in two months (see also USS Fitzgerald and MV ACX Crystal collision), as well as lesser incidents involving USS Lake Champlain (CG-57) and USS Antietam (CG-54), Aucoin was relieved of his command on August 23, 2017, by Vice Admiral Phillip G. Sawyer, deputy commander of the United States Pacific Fleet, due to "loss of confidence in his ability to command."

== Awards and decorations ==
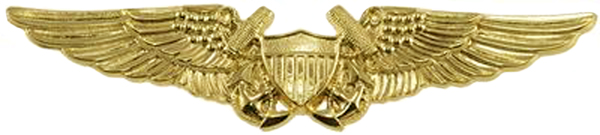

Naval Flight Officer insignia
Navy Distinguished Service Medal with one gold award star		Silver Star
Legion of Merit with three award stars	Distinguished Flying Cross with Combat V	Bronze Star with award star
Defense Meritorious Service Medal	Meritorious Service Medal with award star	Air Medal with two award stars, Combat V and bronze Strike/Flight numeral 8
Navy and Marine Corps Commendation Medal with Combat V and three award stars	Navy and Marine Corps Achievement Medal with two award stars	Joint Meritorious Unit Award with one bronze oak leaf cluster
Navy Unit Commendation with one bronze service star	Navy Meritorious Unit Commendation	Navy "E" Ribbon with two Battle "E" devices
Navy Expeditionary Medal	National Defense Service Medal with service star	Armed Forces Expeditionary Medal with service star
Southwest Asia Service Medal with two service stars	Kosovo Campaign Medal	Global War on Terrorism Expeditionary Medal
Armed Forces Service Medal	Humanitarian Service Medal	Navy Sea Service Deployment Ribbon with two silver and one bronze service stars
Navy & Marine Corps Overseas Service Ribbon with two service stars	NATO Medal for the former Yugoslavia	Kuwait Liberation Medal (Saudi Arabia)
Kuwait Liberation Medal (Kuwait)	Navy Expert Rifleman Medal	Navy Expert Pistol Shot Medal
Office of the Joint Chiefs of Staff Identification Badge
