= USS Fitzgerald =

Arleigh Burke-class destroyer in the US Navy

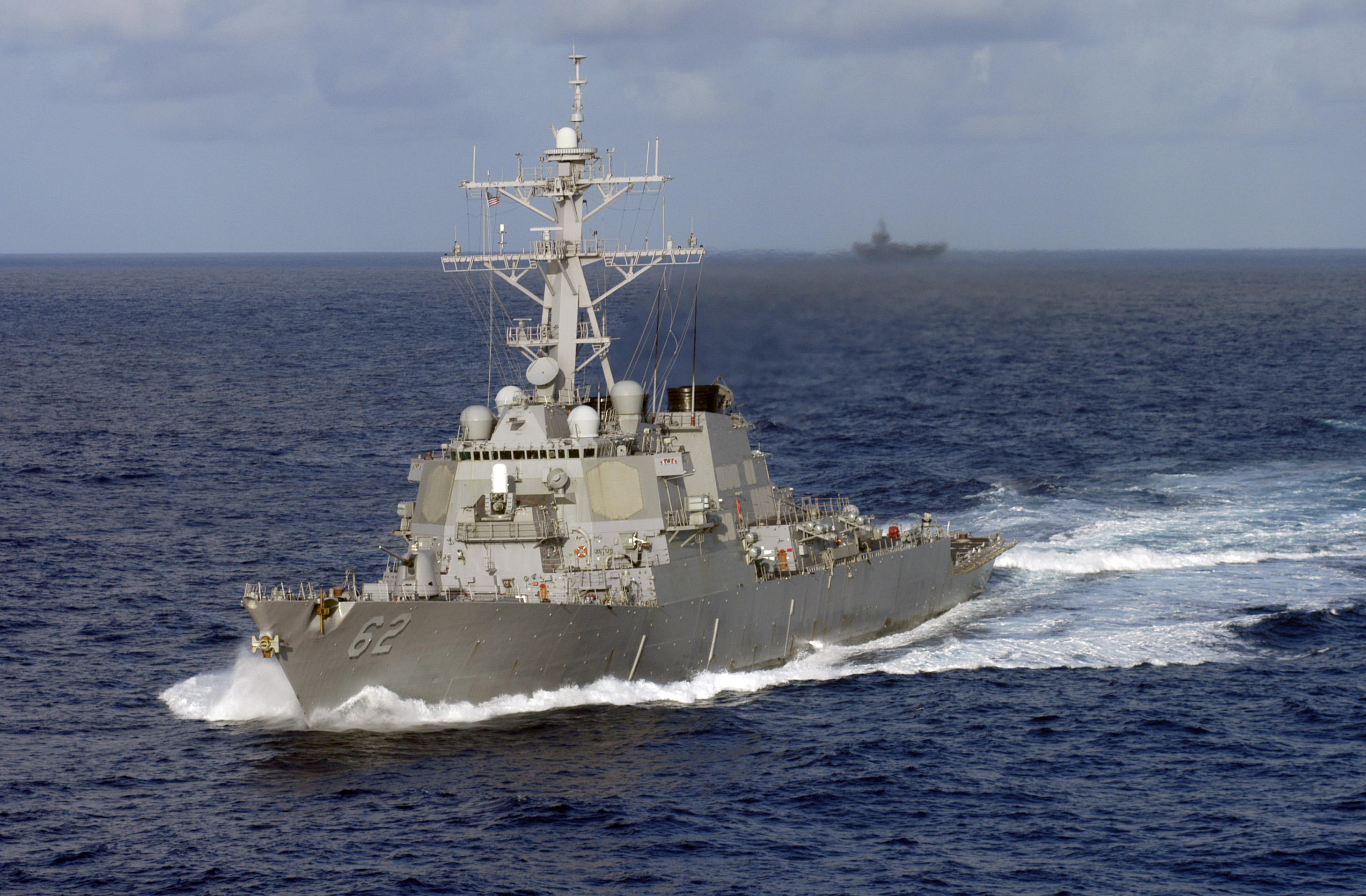
- USS Fitzgerald on 13 August 2005

History

United States
- Name: Fitzgerald
- Namesake: William Charles Fitzgerald
- Ordered: 22 February 1990
- Builder: Bath Iron Works
- Laid down: 9 February 1993
- Launched: 29 January 1994
- Sponsored by: Betty Ann Fitzgerald
- Christened: 29 January 1994
- Commissioned: 14 October 1995
- Home port: San Diego
- Identification: MMSI number: 338839000; Callsign: NFTZ; Hull number: DDG-62
- Motto: Protect Your People
- Nickname(s): Fighting Fitz; Fightin' Fitz
- Honors and awards: See Awards
- Status: in active service
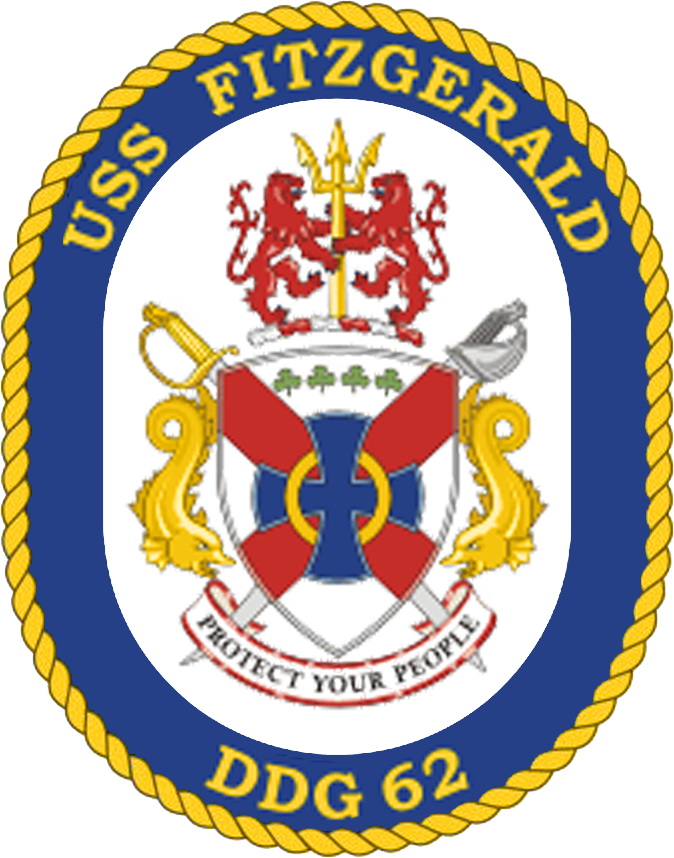
- Badge

General characteristics
- Class & type: Arleigh Burke-class destroyer
- Displacement: Light: approx. 6,800 long tons (6,900 t); Full: approx. 8,900 long tons (9,000 t)
- Length: 505 ft (154 m)
- Beam: 59 ft (18 m)
- Draft: 31 ft (9.4 m)
- Propulsion: 2 × shafts
- Speed: In excess of 30 kn (56 km/h; 35 mph)
- Range: 4,400 nmi (8,100 km; 5,100 mi) at 20 kn (37 km/h; 23 mph)
- Complement: 33 commissioned officers; 38 chief petty officers; 210 enlisted personnel
- Sensors & processing systems: AN/SPY-1D PESA 3D radar (Flight I, II, IIA); AN/SPY-6(V)1 AESA 3D radar (Flight III); AN/SPS-67(V)3 or (V)5 surface search radar (DDG-51 – DDG-118); AN/SPQ-9B surface search radar (DDG-119 onward); AN/SPS-73(V)12 surface search/navigation radar (DDG-51 – DDG-86); BridgeMaster E surface search/navigation radar (DDG-87 onward); 3 × AN/SPG-62 fire-control radar; Mk 46 optical sight system (Flight I, II, IIA); Mk 20 electro-optical sight system (Flight III); AN/SQQ-89 ASW combat system: AN/SQS-53C sonar array; AN/SQR-19 tactical towed array sonar (Flight I, II, IIA); TB-37U multi-function towed array sonar (DDG-113 onward); AN/SQQ-28 LAMPS III shipboard system
- Electronic warfare & decoys: AN/SLQ-32 electronic warfare suite; AN/SLQ-25 Nixie torpedo countermeasures; Mk 36 Mod 12 decoy launching systems; Mk 53 Nulka decoy launching systems; Mk 59 decoy launching systems
- Armament: Guns: 1 × 5-inch (127 mm)/54 mk 45 mod 1/2 (lightweight gun); 2 × 20 mm (0.8 in) Phalanx CIWS; 2 × 25 mm (0.98 in) Mk 38 machine gun system; 4 × 0.50 inches (12.7 mm) caliber guns; Missiles: 8 x Naval Strike Missile; 1 × 29-cell, 1 × 61-cell (90 total cells) Mk 41 vertical launching system (VLS): RIM-66M surface-to-air missile; RIM-156 surface-to-air missile; RIM-161 anti-ballistic missile; BGM-109 Tomahawk cruise missile; RUM-139 vertical launch ASROC; Torpedoes: 2 × Mark 32 triple torpedo tubes: Mark 46 lightweight torpedo; Mark 50 lightweight torpedo; Mark 54 lightweight torpedo
- Aircraft carried: 1 × Sikorsky MH-60R

USS Fitzgerald (DDG-62), named for United States Navy officer Lieutenant William Charles Fitzgerald, is an Arleigh Burke-class (Flight I) Aegis guided missile destroyer in the US Navy.

In the early morning hours of 17 June 2017, the ship was involved in a collision with the container ship MV ACX Crystal, seriously damaging the destroyer. Seven of her crew were killed. Several others were injured, including her commanding officer, Commander Bryce Benson.

== Construction ==
Fitzgerald's keel was laid down by Bath Iron Works, Bath, Maine, 9 February 1993; launched 29 January 1994; sponsored by Betty A. Fitzgerald, widow of the late Lt. Fitzgerald; and commissioned 14 October 1995, in Newport, Rhode Island. The ship was then homeported in Naval Base San Diego, California.

== Service history ==
In early April 2004, Navy officials announced plans to deploy Fitzgerald, 14 other destroyers, and three cruisers to counter ballistic missile threats worldwide. The next month, she took part in a personnel exchange known as "Super Swap", taking aboard 141 sailors from the destroyer O'Brien and transferring 95 to join the soon-to-be-decommissioned ship's decommissioning unit. Fitzgerald sailed to Yokosuka Naval Base in Yokosuka, Japan, arriving on 30 September 2004, and joining the U.S. 7th Fleet's Destroyer Squadron 15.

In March 2011, in company with the aircraft carrier Ronald Reagan, Fitzgerald was deployed off northeastern Honshu, Japan, to assist with relief efforts after the 2011 Tōhoku earthquake and tsunami.

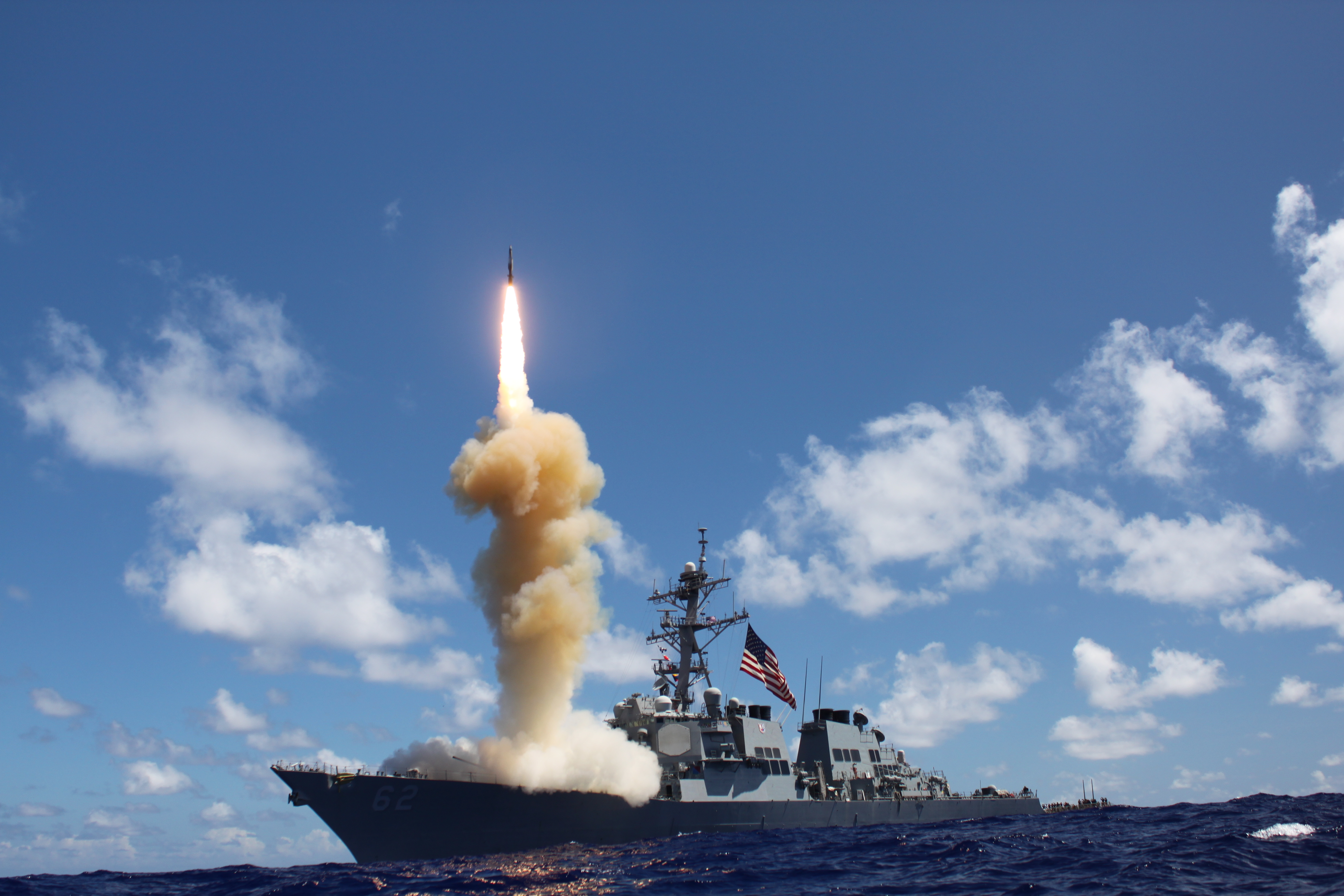
USS Fitzgerald fires a missile, 25 October 2012.

On 16 November 2011, while docked in Manila, Philippines, Fitzgerald hosted US Secretary of State Hillary Clinton and Philippine Foreign Affairs Secretary Albert del Rosario to sign the Manila Declaration, which called for multilateral talks to resolve maritime disputes and to mark the 60th anniversary of the American–Philippine Mutual Defense Treaty.

On 1 June 2017, Fitzgerald, operating out of Yokosuka Naval Base, was noted for participating in routine exercises with Japan that were described in the media as a show of force to North Korea. She sailed with the aircraft carrier Ronald Reagan, the cruiser Shiloh, and the destroyers Barry, McCampbell, and Mustin, joined by the aircraft carrier Carl Vinson, cruiser Lake Champlain, and destroyers Wayne E. Meyer and Michael Murphy, and Japanese ships Hyūga and Ashigara.

=== 2017 collision ===
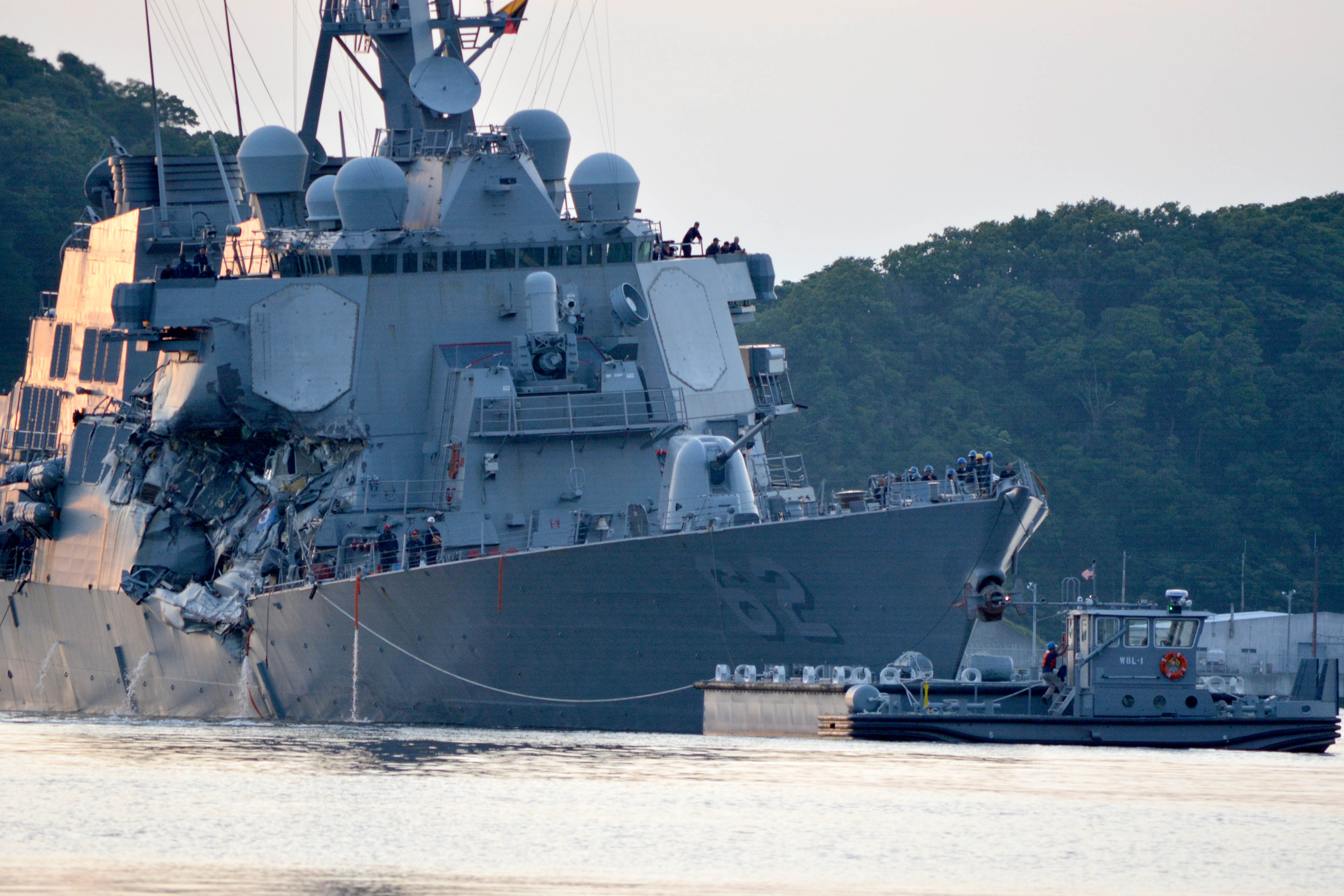
Damaged Fitzgerald after the collision

About 1:30 a.m. on 17 June 2017, Fitzgerald collided with ACX Crystal, a Philippine-flagged container ship measured at 29,060 gross tons and almost 40,000 tons deadweight. Most of Fitzgerald's crew of about 300 were asleep at the time. The collision occurred about 56 nautical miles (104 kilometres; 64 miles) southwest of her homeport of Yokosuka, Japan.

The starboard side of Fitzgerald was seriously damaged. The container ship's bulbous bow penetrated the destroyer's hull below the waterline, flooding a machinery space, the radio room, and two crew berthing spaces. The captain's cabin was crushed. Seven crewmen were reported missing after the collision, but their bodies were found the next day after rescue workers gained access to flooded compartments. The injured include the ship's commanding officer and two sailors.

Within a day of the collision, investigations were begun by the United States Navy, U.S. Coast Guard, Japanese Coast Guard, Japan Transport Safety Board, and the insurers of the Crystal. The U.S. Navy's Manual of the Judge Advocate General (JAGMAN) investigation concerns the crew's operations, and is led by Rear Admiral Brian Fort, a former commander of USS Gonzalez, who now commands Navy Region Hawaii and Naval Surface Group Middle Pacific. The U.S. and Japanese coast guards are investigating the cause of the accident. Steffan Watkins, a Canada-based security analyst, created a Google Maps overlay for the broadcast AIS data points.

Including costs for planned service life extension and other upgrades, repairs for the damage to Fitzgerald were expected to run about $368.7 million, and will take over a year. Repairs on the ship will overlap with planned service life extension and electronics upgrade, but despite the need to replace portions of the ship's AEGIS system the ship will remain in "a legacy configuration instead of upgrading to Baseline 9".

On 17 August 2017, the two senior officers and the senior enlisted sailor in charge of the naval vessel were relieved of their duties. The Navy planned to discipline up to a dozen sailors, including the commanding officer, for watchstanding failures that allowed the fatal collision.

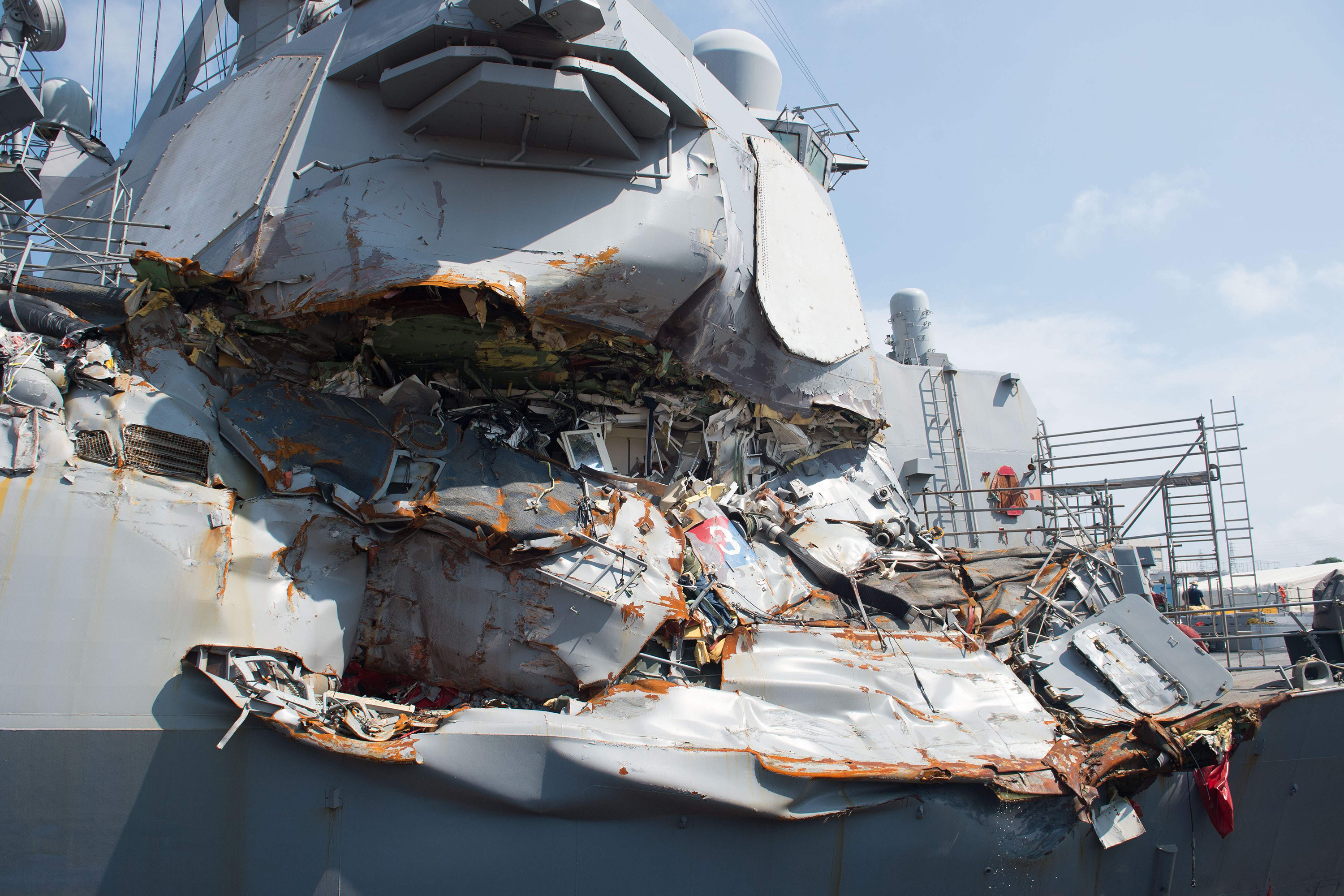
Damage to USS Fitzgerald

In late August 2017, it was reported that the destroyer will be transported by the Dockwise heavy-lift ship MV Transshelf to Huntington Ingalls Industries' shipyard in Pascagoula.

It was announced in October that the vessel would not be upgraded to the latest version of the Aegis system.

On 28 November 2017, the destroyer was further damaged by two punctures to her hull during the loading process to MV Transshelf, compelling her to return to Yokosuka for the punctures to be repaired.

Fitzgerald arrived at the Port of Pascagoula in Mississippi on 19 January 2018, aboard the heavy-lift transport MV Transshelf, after a two-month journey from Japan. She was expected to spend a few days in the port, being lifted off the transport and readied for her trip to the Huntington Ingalls Industries shipyard, where she was expected to commence an estimated two year repair.

In August 2019, the Japan Transport Safety Board's final report concluded distraction and incomplete radar information aboard the US Navy vessel caused the accident.

=== Return to service ===
On 3 February 2020, USS Fitzgerald exited the Pascagoula shipyard for sea trials aimed at testing all shipboard systems. Following the sea trials, Fitzgerald returned to the shipyard to correct any remaining issues and then commence crew training in preparation for return to active duty. On 13 June 2020 she departed Pascagoula to return to her home port in San Diego.

In May 2022, Fitzgerald was homeported at Naval Station San Diego and a part of Destroyer Squadron 2, along with Carrier Strike Group 3 led by USS Abraham Lincoln. Fitzgerald participated in RIMPAC 2022.

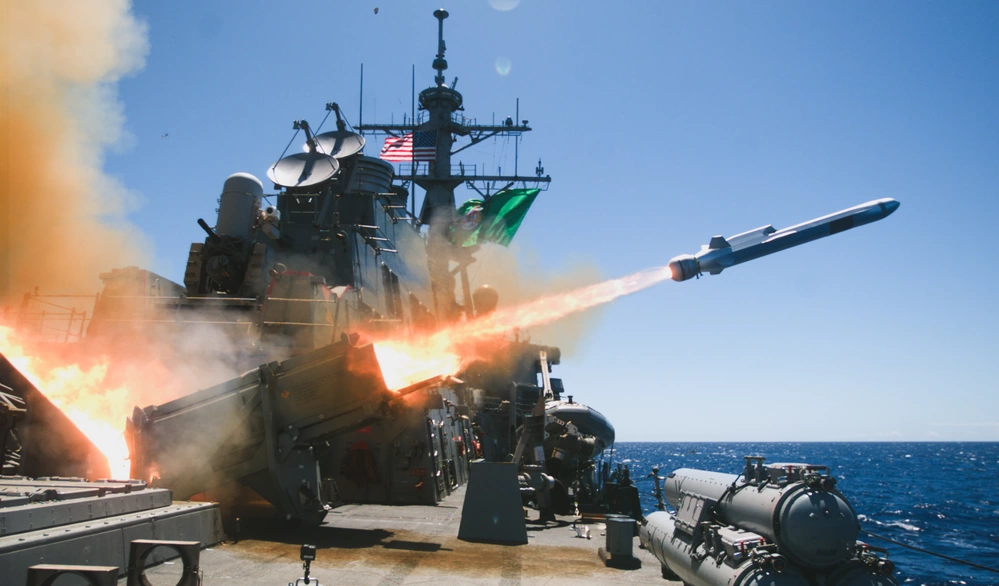
USS Fitzgerald fires first Naval Strike Missile from U.S. warship

Fitzgerald fired a Kongsberg Naval Strike Missile during RIMPAC 2024; the Harpoon missile launchers were removed to accommodate the NSM.

In January 2025, Fitzgerald became the first U.S. Navy warship to be equipped with an artificial intelligence (AI) system. The system, known as Enterprise Remote Monitoring Version 4 (ERM v4), utilizes machine learning to monitor ship systems such as mechanical, electrical, and hull components by analyzing over 10,000 sensor readings per second. The AI aims to identify potential maintenance issues before they arise, allowing the crew to address them proactively and minimize operational downtime. ERM v4, developed by Fathom5, replaces the previous Integrated Condition Assessment System (ICAS) and is intended to support the Navy's efforts to maintain a more readily available fleet, particularly in high-demand situations.

On 3 October 2025, Fitzgerald arrived at the Port of Colombo, Sri Lanka, on a replenishment visit under the command of Commander Paul Richardson.

Between 10 and 18 November, Fitzgerald participated in the 2025 edition of Exercise Malabar along with JS Hyūga, INS Sahyadri and HMAS Ballarat of the Japanese Navy, Indian Navy and Australian Navy. The formation of ships was supported by a P-8A Poseidon aircraft of the Royal Australian Air Force which was deployed from the Andersen Air Force Base. The exercise included complex drills in anti-submarine warfare, air defence and replenishment at sea. The harbour phase was conducted on 10–12 November at Naval Base Guam followed by the Sea Phase on 13–17 November in the west Pacific training area.

In March 2026, the ship participated in the Royal Australian Navy's Exercise Kakadu Fleet Review on Sydney Harbour.

== Awards ==
- Captain Edward F. Ney Memorial Award for outstanding food service - (2012)
- Navy Unit Commendation - (16-20 Dec 1998)
- Navy Meritorious Unit Commendation - (Dec 2000-Mar 2001, Apr 2012-Dec 2013)
- Navy E Ribbon - (1997, 1998, 1999, 2007, 2008, 2009, 2011, 2013)
- Humanitarian Service Medal - (Mar-May 2011) 2011 Tōhoku earthquake and tsunami
- Spokane Trophy - (2000)
- Marjorie Sterrett Battleship Fund Award - (2007)
- Vice Admiral Thomas H. Copeman III Material Readiness Award – (2021)

== See also ==
- USS John S. McCain and Alnic MC collision
