= USS Charles H. Roan =

USS Charles H. Roan, named after Charles H. Roan, a US Marine, may refer to:

- USS Charles H. Roan (DD-853), a Gearing-class destroyer.
- USS Charles H. Roan (DD-815), a cancelled Gearing-class destroyer.
