= MV ACX Crystal =

Philippine-operated container vessel

History
- Name: ACX Crystal
- Owner: Olympic Steamship Co SA, Panama; Sinbanali Shipping Inc, Philippines (disponent owner)
- Port of registry: Manila, Philippines
- Builder: STX Offshore & Shipbuilding, Changwon, South Korea
- Yard number: 1240
- Launched: 20 June 2008
- In service: August 2008
- Identification: IMO number: 9360611; MMSI number: 548789000; Call sign: DYUG
- Status: In service

General characteristics
- Type: Container ship
- Tonnage: 29,060 GT; 14,422 NT; 39,565 DWT
- Length: 222.6 m (730 ft)
- Beam: 30.1 m (99 ft)
- Draught: 12 m (39 ft)
- Installed power: MAN-B&W 8K80MC-C, 28,880 kW (38,730 hp)
- Speed: 25.3 knots (46.9 km/h; 29.1 mph) (maximum); 23 knots (43 km/h; 26 mph) (service)
- Capacity: 2,858 TEU
- Crew: 20

ACX Crystal is a container ship built in South Korea in 2008. In June, 2017, the ship was damaged in a collision with USS Fitzgerald south of Yokosuka, Japan.

== Description ==
ACX Crystal is a container ship built in 2008 by STX Offshore & Shipbuilding at their Jinhae shipyard in Changwon, South Korea. The ship is 222.6 metres (730 ft) long overall, has a beam of 30.1 metres (99 ft) and fully laden draws 12 metres (39 ft) of water. She has a container capacity of 2,858 twenty-foot equivalent units (TEU), gross tonnage of 29,060, net tonnage of 14,422 and deadweight tonnage of 39,565 tons. Her main engine, manufactured by STX, is an 8-cylinder MAN B&W 8K80MC-C low-speed diesel engine with a maximum continuous rating of 28,880 kW (38,730 hp), giving ACX Crystal a maximum speed of 25.3 knots (46.9 km/h; 29.1 mph) and a service speed of 23 knots (43 km/h; 26 mph).

The ship is classified by the Japanese classification society Nippon Kaiji Kyokai (ClassNK) and insured with the Japanese Shipowners P&I Association.

== Ownership and deployment ==
ACX Crystal has been owned by Olympic Steamship Co SA, Panama (a subsidiary of Japanese shipowner Sunford Shipping Ltd) and managed by Sea Quest Ship Management Inc of Bacoor, Cavite, Philippines since 2008. The ship has been bareboat-chartered to Sinbanali Shipping Inc of Manila since 2014, but is reported by NYK Line on June 17 as being actually owned by Dainichi-Invest Corporation, a Japanese ship investment firm. ACX Crystal is a mid-size container ship employed by ACX ('Asia Container Express'), the intra-Asia container shipping trade subsidiary of NYK Line, the global shipping and freight logistics division of the Japanese conglomerate Mitsubishi.

In June 2017, ACX Crystal was employed by NYK on its 'PX1' (Phoenix 1) intra-Asia trade line linking Japan, Vietnam and Thailand ports. As is common in the container shipping industry, the ship's cargo capacity is shared by NYK with other lines, such as Mitsui O.S.K. Lines, K Line and other lines.

As NYK, MOL and "K" Lines shipping are creating new joint venture company under new brand name of Ocean Network Express (ONE), now ACX Crystal serve as the ONE fleet under PID service which have direct port rotation of Singapore-Port Kelang (North)-Subic Bay-Manila-Singapore-Surabaya-Singapore

== 2017 collision ==
At 01.30 local time on 17 June 2017 (17.30 UTC 16 June), ACX Crystal, carrying 1,080 containers from Nagoya to Tokyo, reported that it had collided with USS Fitzgerald near Shizuoka, Japan, about 56 nautical miles (104 kilometres; 64 miles) south of the Yokosuka Japanese and US naval base at the entrance of Tokyo Bay. The merchant ship's port bow and bulbous bow suffered minor damage. Fitzgerald suffered severe damage to both her starboard side superstructure and her starboard side below the waterline. Fitzgerald's commanding officer and two sailors were injured and evacuated by helicopter, and seven Navy sailors were found dead in the damaged, flooded starboard compartments.

NYK stated that none of the 20 crew members aboard the container ship, all Filipino, were injured, and that the ship was not leaking oil. They also confirmed their full co-operation with Japan Coast Guard's investigation of the incident, which began the same day. On 17 August 2017, Vice Chief of Naval Operations Admiral William Moran stated that "serious mistakes" were made by the Fitzgerald's "bridge team" (those conducting safety watch on board the ship's bridge) which caused them to lose "situational awareness," thus rendering it impossible to avoid the collision even after the ACX Crystal was sighted. By 18 September 2017, six senior officials in the US Navy had been removed from duty in connection with the Fitzgerald collision and the 23 August 2017 collision of its sister ship, the USS John S. McCain with the oil tanker MV Alnic MC.

The estates of the Fitzgerald sailors killed in the collision and the sailors who were injured sued NYK in Federal court in Louisiana but their cases were dismissed because NYK was not subject to the jurisdiction of American courts.
