= Michael P. Donnelly (admiral) =

U.S. Navy admiral

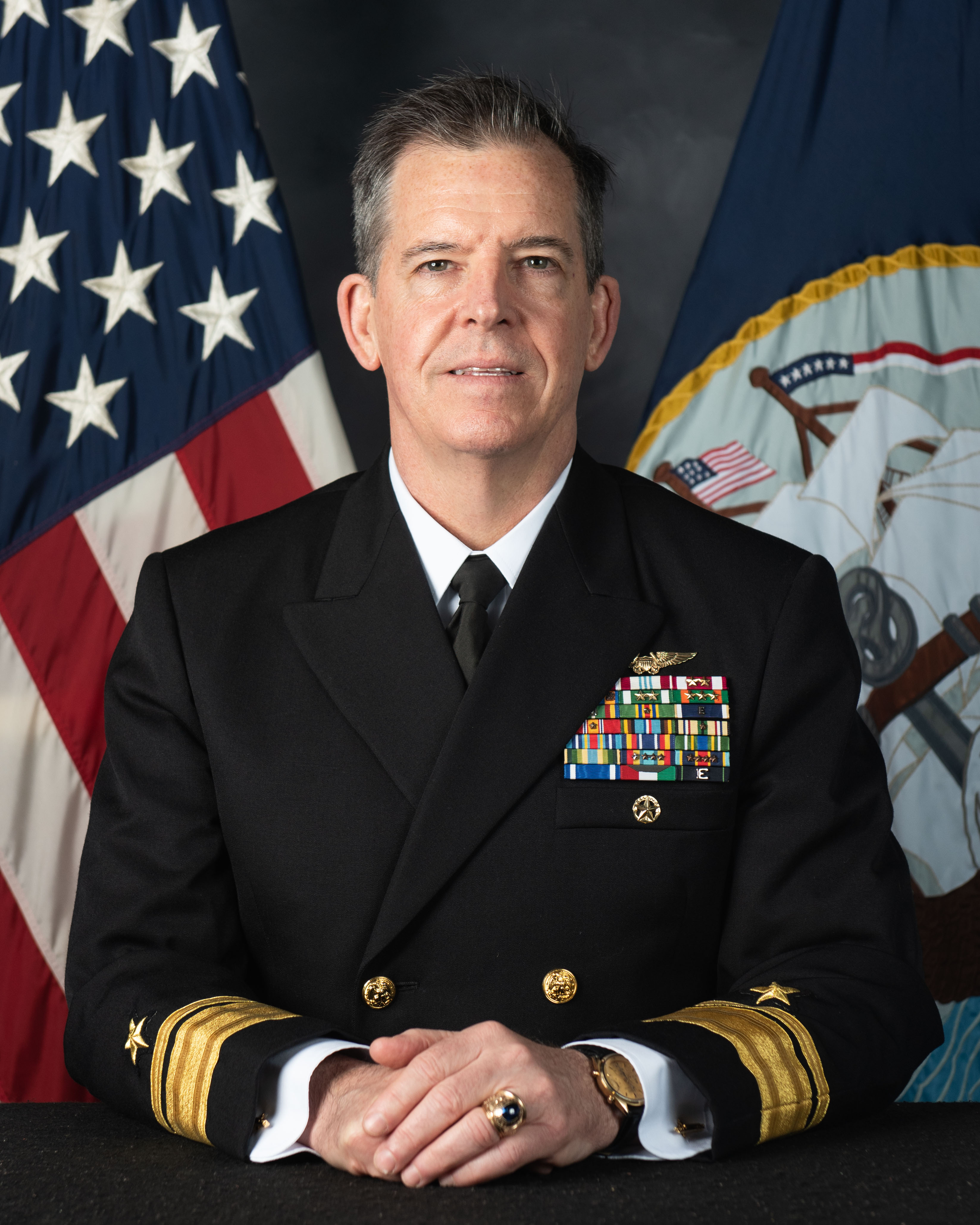
- Born: March 25, 1967 (age 59); Hartford, Connecticut, U.S.
- Education: Villanova University; United States Naval War College
- Relatives: dd
- Military career
- Allegiance: United States
- Branch: United States Navy
- Service years: 1989–present
- Rank: Rear Admiral
- Nickname: Buzz
- Commands: Carrier Strike Group 5 United States Naval Forces Korea; Navy Region Korea; Task Force 78; USS Ronald Reagan (CVN-76); USS Denver (LPD-9); VFA-154
- Awards: Legion of Merit (2)

Michael P. "Buzz" Donnelly (born March 25, 1967) is a United States Navy rear admiral and naval flight officer who most recently served as Director of Air Warfare of the United States Navy from August 2023 to May 2025. He served as the commander of Carrier Strike Group 5 and Task Force 70 from October 2021 to June 2023. He previously served as the 37th commander of United States Naval Forces Korea, concurrently serving as commander of Navy Region Korea and Task Force 78 from April 2019 to September 2021.

Donnelly also served as the commanding officer of USS Ronald Reagan (CVN-76) from April 2016 to September 2018, with prior command tours as the final commander of USS Denver (LPD-9) from October 2013 to its decommissioning in September 2014, and commander of Strike Fighter Squadron 154 (VFA-154). He was promoted to captain effective February 1, 2011.

In February 2023, he was nominated for promotion to rear admiral. In June 2025, he was nominated for promotion to vice admiral and assignment as commander of the United States Seventh Fleet. The nomination was withdrawn post-confirmation, following questions about drag performances that were held aboard USS Ronald Reagan when he was in command from 2016 to 2018.

Military offices
Preceded by Kevin P. Lenox	Commanding Officer of USS Denver (LPD-9); 2013–2014	Vessel decommissioned
Preceded by Christopher E. Bolt	Commanding Officer of USS Ronald Reagan (CVN-76); 2016–2018	Succeeded by Patrick J. Hannifin
Preceded by Michael E. Boyle	Commander of the United States Naval Forces Korea and Navy Region Korea; 2019–2021	Succeeded by Mark A. Schafer
Preceded by William P. Pennington	Commander of Carrier Strike Group 5; 2021–2023	Succeeded by Patrick J. Hannifin
Preceded by Andrew J. Loiselle	Director of Air Warfare of the United States Navy; 2023–2025	Succeeded by Michael S. Wosje
