= Presidential Unit Citation (South Korea) =

- Presidential Unit Citation
- Type: Unit award
- Awarded for: Exceptional meritorious service to South Korea.
- Presented by: the President of South Korea
- Eligibility: South Korea and foreign military units including units that participated in the defense of South Korea as part of the U.N. forces during the Korean War.
- Status: Currently awarded
- Republic of Korea Presidential Unit Citation streamer

The Presidential Unit Citation (Korean: 대통령부대표창; Hanja: 大統領部隊表彰) is a military unit award of the government of Republic of Korea that may be presented to South Korean and foreign military units for outstanding performance in defense of the Republic of Korea. In recognition of allied military service to South Korea during the Korean War, all United States military departments were authorized the unit award for that period.

Officially, the South Korean government does not have the term: Presidential Unit Citation (대통령 부대 표창). This is the one of Presidential Citations (대통령 표창)' awarded to organizations such as local governments, military units, hospitals, etc.

== Appearance and wear ==
When the Republic of Korea Presidential Unit Citation is worn on the South Korea military uniform (right side), it is as a ribbon 1 3/8 inches (35 mm) wide surrounded by a gold frame. The ribbon is white, with a 15/64 inch (6 mm) red above blue Taeguk in the center. At the edge of the ribbon, on each side, are the following stripes: 13/64 inch (5 mm) Hunter Green; 1/64 inch (0.4 mm) White; 1/64 inch (0.4 mm) Old Glory Red; 1/64 inch (0.4 mm) white; 1/64 inch (0.4 mm) Old Glory Red; 1/64 inch (0.4 mm) white; 1/64 inch (0.4 mm) Hunter Green. No ribbon devices are authorized for wear with this award, although a bronze service star on the ribbon can be observed on several portraits of Korean War veterans from the U.S. Armed Forces.

=== Smaller version ===
Foreign military unit members who are authorized to wear the award either wear the award on the right side of the uniform (e.g. U.S. Army) with any other same-sized unit award emblems or wear the slightly smaller-sized version of the award on the left side of the uniform (e.g. U.S. Marine Corps, Navy, Coast Guard, Air Force) with their other service ribbons.

== Notable recipients ==
=== Post-Korean War ===
- United States Marine Corps for service in South Korea between 9 December 1999 to 24 April 2002
- 2nd Infantry Division was recognized in 2011, for its support of South Korea over the preceding 60 years.
- The Seventh Air Force was recognized in October 2013 for longstanding achievements in operational readiness and force employment in South Korea.
- U.S. Eighth Army was recognized on October 1, 2014, for outstanding performance in defense of the Republic of Korea.
- U.S. Naval Forces Korea was recognized in September 2017 "outstanding contribution to the defense of the Republic of Korea."
- Seventh Air Force was recognized in October 2019 for contributions enhancing the national security of the Republic of Korea and for interoperability, combined operations and combat readiness. The United States Secretary of the Air Force did not approve the award, and Air Force members were not authorized to wear it.
- Special Operations Command Korea (SOCKOR) was awarded on September 29, 2023. The Republic of Korea’s (ROK) President, Yoon Suk Yeol, awarded U.S. Special Operations Command Korea (SOCKOR) with the Presidential Unit Citation at the 75th Anniversary ceremony of the ROK Armed Forces Day at Seoul Air Base (K-16), Seongnam, ROK.
- U.S. Naval Forces Korea 2024.

=== Korean War ===
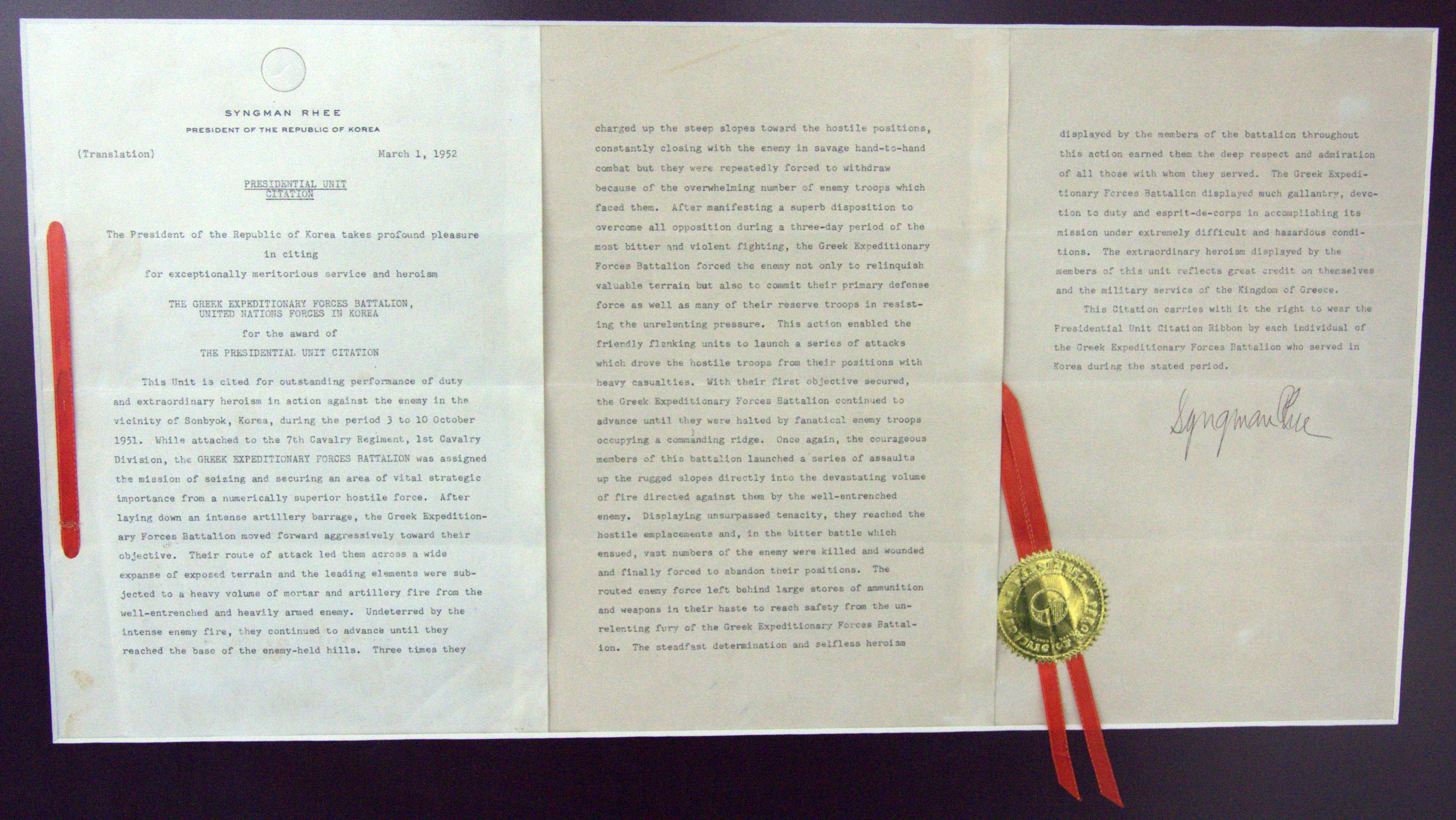
English translation of the award document of the Presidential Unit Citation to the Greek Expeditionary Force, Athens War Museum

- 1st Marine Division (Reinforced) for operations from 26 October 1950 to 27 July 1953, including the Inchon landing, Second Battle of Seoul and Battle of Chosin Reservoir
- 58th Engineer Treadway Bridge Company for its bridge-building efforts with the X Corps at the Chosin Reservoir and the Inchon landing in 1950.
- 7th Infantry Division three times. The first was for service at Inchon, the second for service during the period of 1950–1953, and finally for deployment to the Korean Peninsula from 1945 to 1948 and from 1953 to 1971.
- The French Battalion of the UNO under the operational control of the 23rd U.S. Infantry Regiment, 2nd U.S. Infantry Division receive two times the Republic of Korea Presidential Unit Citation.
- One Italian unit, the "Ospedale da Campo n° 68" (Field Hospital no. 68) of "Corpo Militare della Croce Rossa Italiana" (Military Corp of Italian Red Cross), was awarded this battle honour twice: October 6, 1952, and December 30, 1954.
- One Turkish unit, Turkish Brigade, which repulsed a Chinese force three times its size during the battle of Kumyangjang-Ni (25–26 January) of the Korean War, was awarded the Presidential Unit Citation from the President of Korea on July 11, 1951.
- The U.S. Army's 65th Infantry Regiment of the 3rd Infantry Division was awarded this battle honor twice during the Korean War. The first was for service in the Uijongbu Corridor in June 1951. The second was for service in the Iron Triangle at Hill 717 in July 1951.
- One South African unit, the 2 Squadron SAAF was also awarded this battle honour. It was presented on November 1, 1951. It reads "This unit was dispatched from South Africa in support of the United Nations Forces in Korea. It was equipped with P-51 aircraft and has functioned continually in support of operations of the Eighth Army. Through all gallantry and devotion to duty of its personnel it has earned high praise and its losses in pilots have been heavy. It continued to meet cheerfully all tasks allotted to it, and gives a higher performance than is normally expected."
- 16 Field Regiment of the Royal New Zealand Artillery.
- A Dutch battalion (Van Heutsz) embedded into the US 2nd Infantry Division was awarded the U.S. Presidential Unit Citation in February 1951, for the capture of Hill 325, north of Manjong Station. The under-strength A Company, reinforced by personnel from B and heavy weapons companies, was ordered to recapture Hill 325 on 15 February 1951. At 0230 hrs the next morning, the Dutch were beaten back by heavy machine gun fire; at 0345 hrs, they tried again and this time advanced to within 300 meters of the crest before again being repulsed. Just before dawn, the exhausted Dutch, their ammunition almost expended, fixed bayonets and, shouting their battle cry, gained their objective. For these actions the Van Heutsz received its first U.S. Presidential Unit Citation. This came at a cost, however, as the battalion had suffered over a hundred casualties.
- 17th Bombardment Wing, Light
- The Greek Expeditionary Force as part of the United Nations multinational forces.
- NORMASH
- Danish Hospitalship MS Jutlandia received the Citation twice, 27 March 1952, 27 August 1954

== See also ==
- United States Presidential Unit Citation
- Philippine Republic Presidential Unit Citation
- Vietnam Presidential Unit Citation
