= Busan Naval Base =

Naval base of the Republic of Korea Navy

- 부산 해군기지
- Nam District, Busan in South Korea
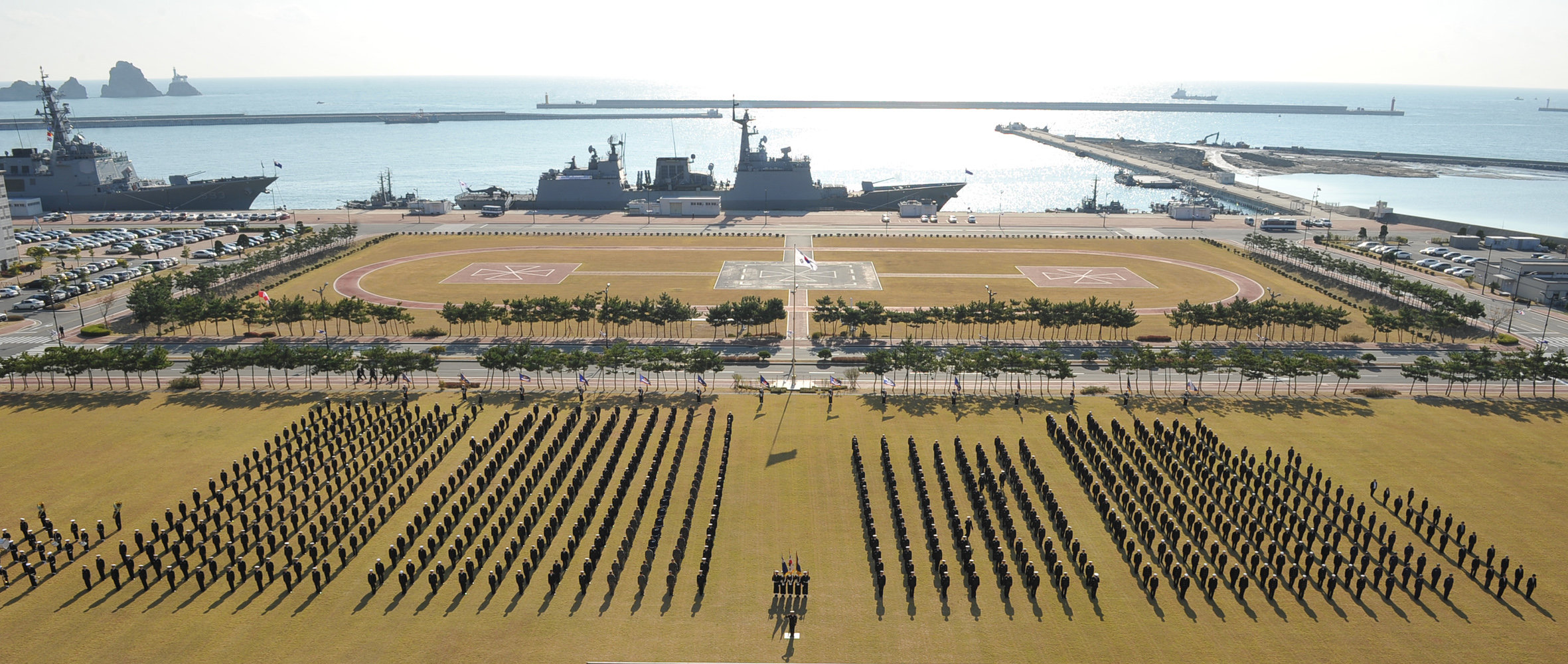

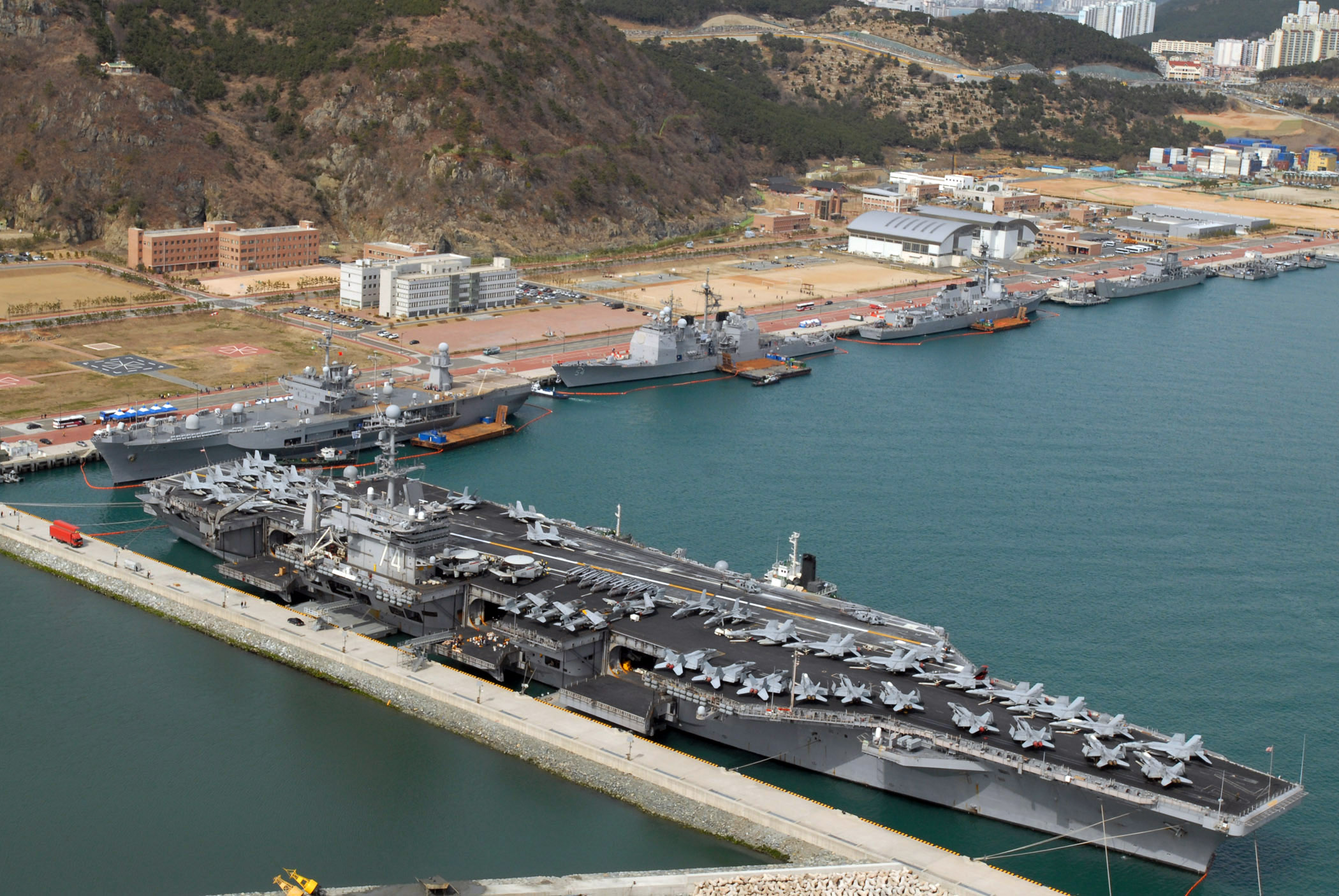

Site information
- Type: Naval base
- Owner: Republic of Korea Navy
- Operator: Republic of Korea Navy; United States Navy
- Open to the public: No

Location
- Location within South Korea
- Coordinates: 35.096688°N 129.103891°E

Site history
- Built: 16 June 2006
- In use: 2007

Garrison information
- Occupants: Republic of Korea Fleet Command; United States Naval Forces Korea

The Busan Naval Base (Korean: 부산 해군기지; Hanja: 釜山海軍基地) is a group of ports and land facilities of the Republic of Korea Navy (ROKN), located at Nam-Gu, Busan. The United States Naval Forces Korea headquarters sit within this base.

The base can accommodate up to 30 vessels, including the Republic of Korea Navy Dokdo-class amphibious assault ship and the US Navy's Nimitz-class aircraft carriers.

== History ==
The Busan Naval Base was completed in 5 years and 6 months from January 2001 to June 15, 2006, based on the construction cost of KRW 50 billion. 30 ships, including the Sejong the Great-class destroyers, can be anchored at port at the same time.

The base became operational in 2007, when the Republic of Korea Navy relocated to Busan from Jinhae Naval Base. Among the reasons for the relocation were speed restrictions around Jinhae which slowed access to and from the base.

On September 12, 2010, Admiral Seong-chan Kim, Chief of Naval Staff of the Republic of Korea, and Admiral Patrick M. Walsh, Commander of the U.S. Pacific Fleet, discussed a plan to relocate the U.S. Naval Command to Busan Naval Base. Starting with the groundbreaking ceremony on August 29, 2013, the headquarters building with one basement level and two stories above the ground was completed in September 2015 on a site of 9040 sq. metre with an investment of approximately KRW 6.4 billion. On 19 February 2016, the relocation from the Yongsan Garrison in Seoul was completed.

United States Navy ships enter the port mainly for combined training and pilgrimage, and on October 22, 2013, three Russian Navy ships (destroyer Admiral Vinogradov, salvage tug Kalar, and tanker Irkut) arrived at the naval base. On December 1, 2015, the ROKN 7th Task Flotilla moved to the Jeju Naval Base.

== Facilities and operational units ==
- Republic of Korea Fleet command
- United States Naval Forces Korea

== Gallery ==
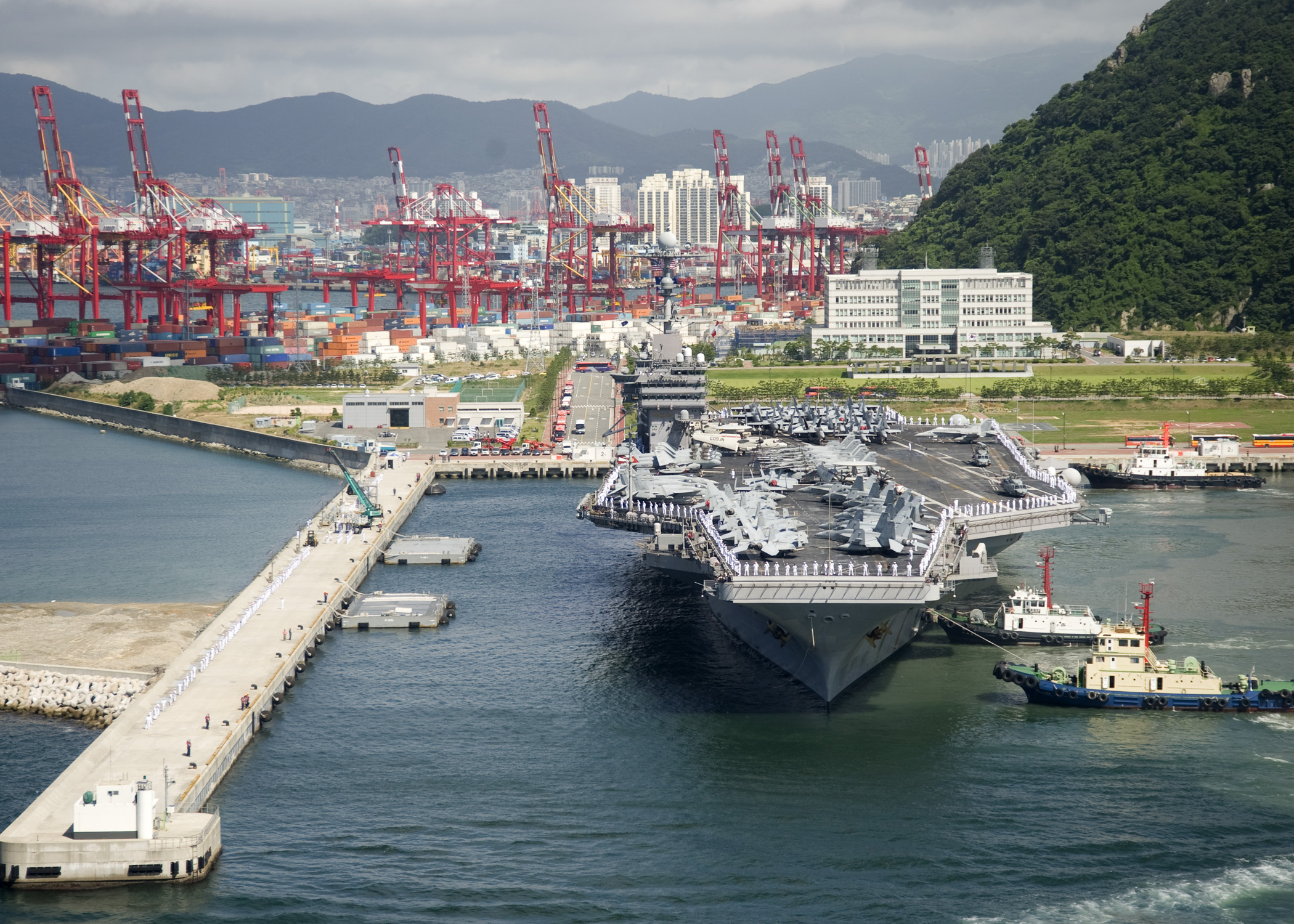
USS George Washington being moved into dock

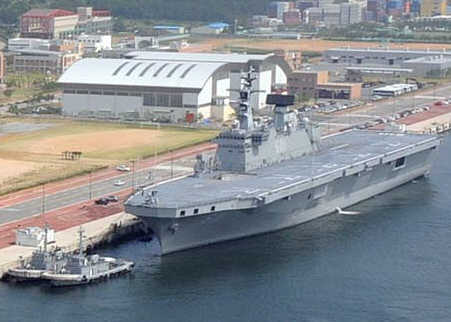
ROKS Dokdo in port

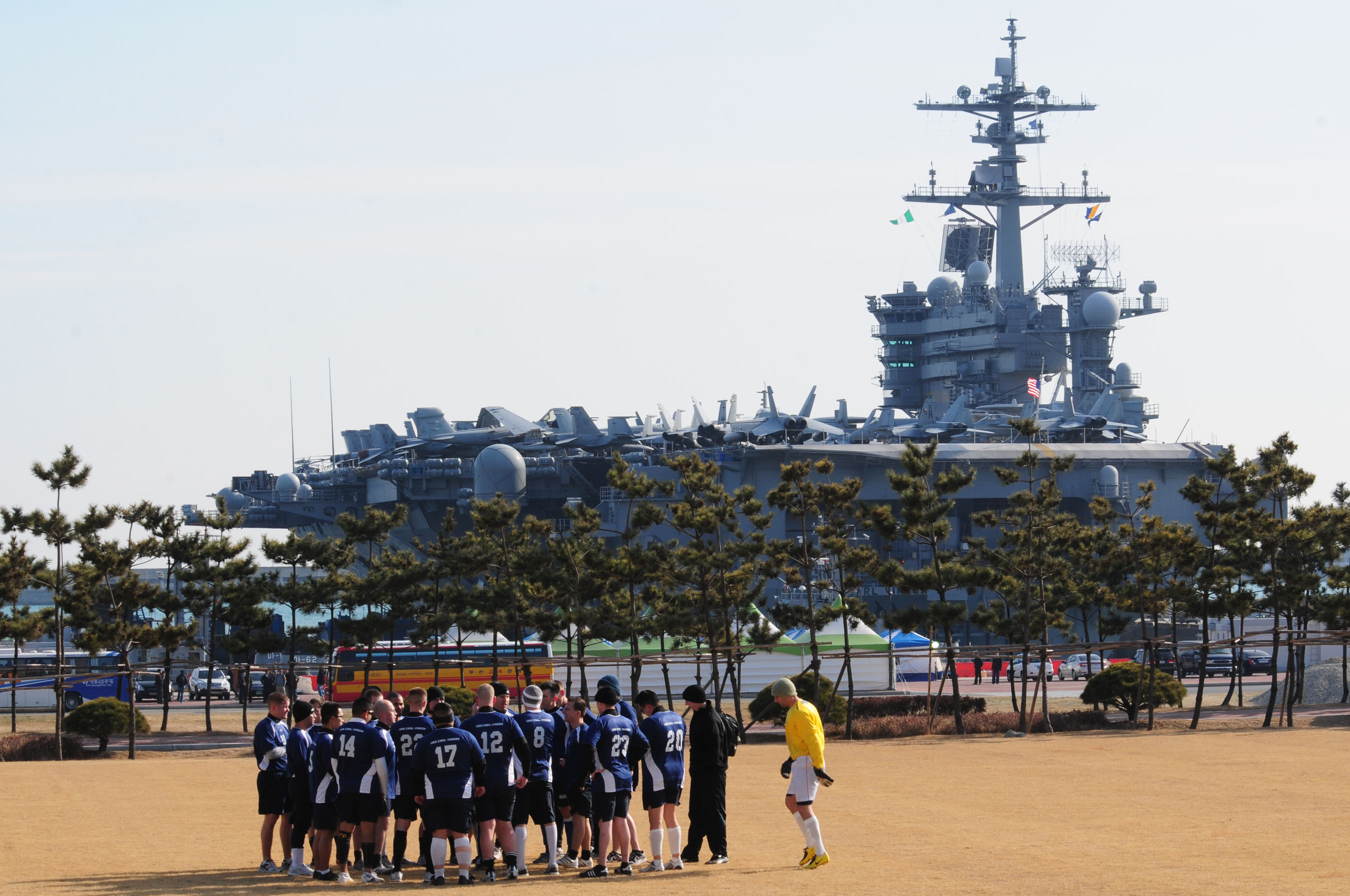
USS Carl Vinson at Busan Naval Base

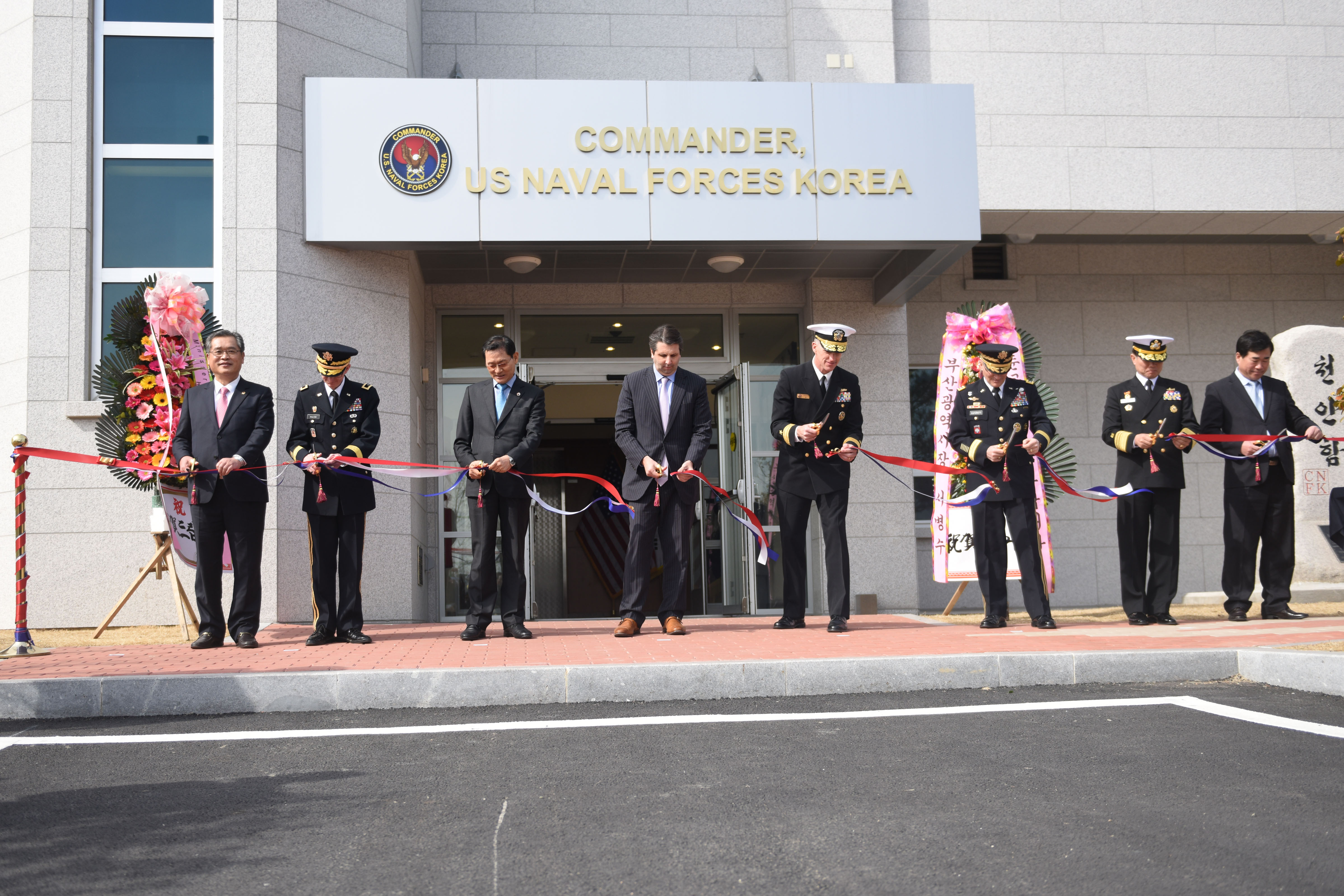
United States Naval Forces Korea headquarters

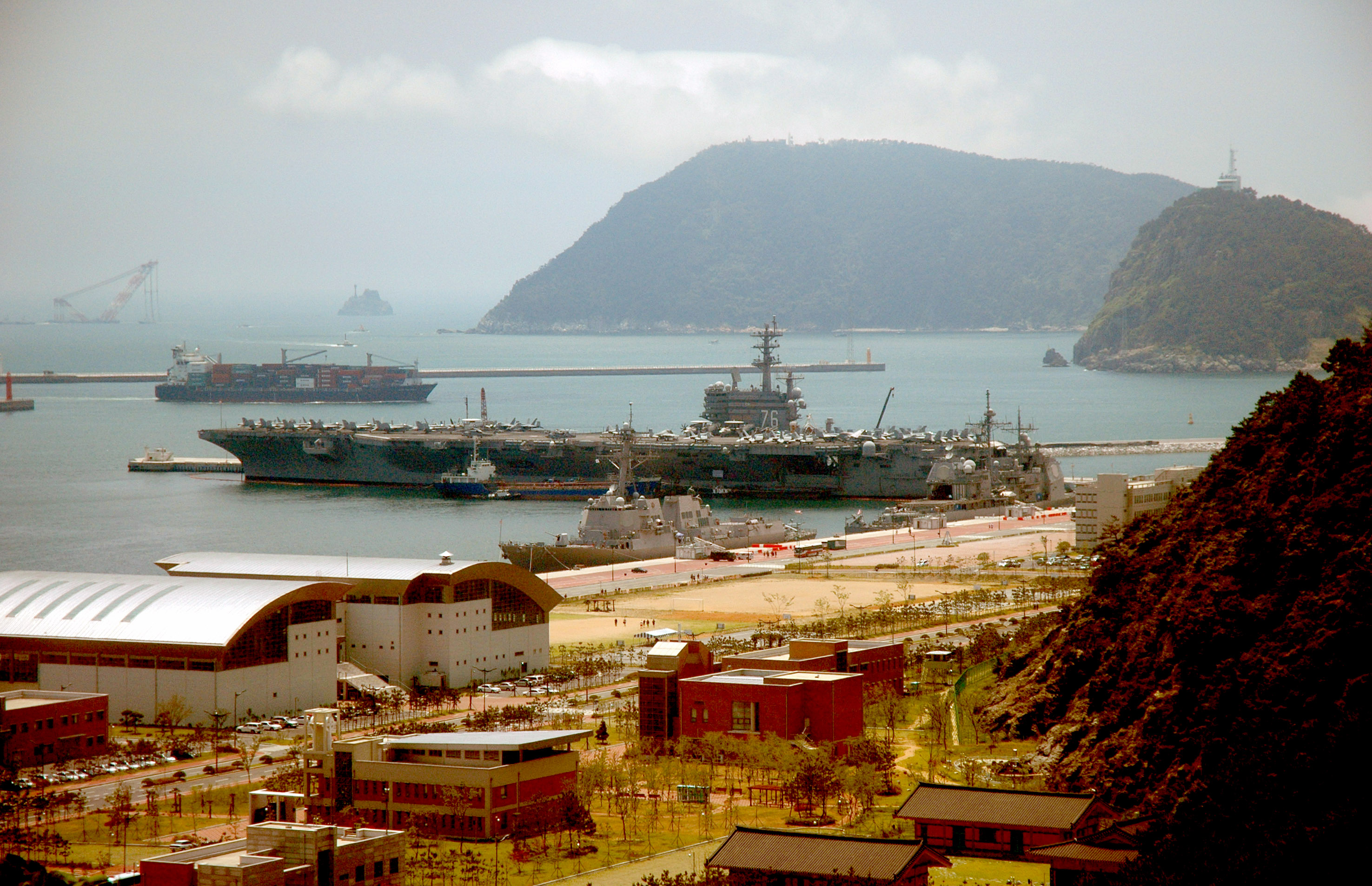
USS Ronald Reagan moored on 17 July 2008
