= Will Pennington =

U.S. Navy admiral (born 1967)

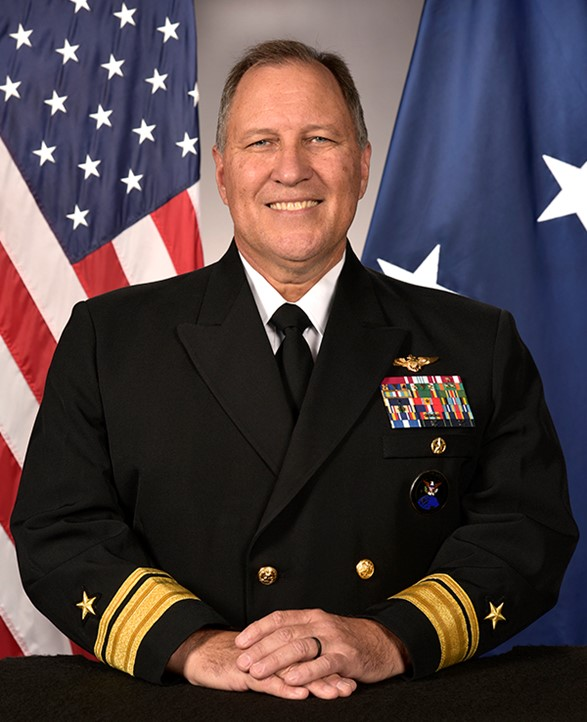
- Official portrait, 2022
- Born: 1967 (age 58–59); Wilton, Iowa, U.S.
- Military career
- Allegiance: United States
- Branch: United States Navy
- Service years: 1989–2025
- Rank: Rear Admiral
- Commands: Carrier Strike Group 5 USS George H.W. Bush (CVN-77); USS Blue Ridge (LCC-19); VFA-14
- Conflicts: Iraqi no-fly zones conflict Kosovo War; Iraq War; War in Afghanistan; War against the Islamic State
- Awards: Legion of Merit

William Paul Pennington (born 1967) is a retired United States Navy rear admiral who last served as chief of staff of the United States Space Command from August 24, 2022. He most recently served as deputy commander of the United States Tenth Fleet from November 2021 to August 2022. He previously commanded Carrier Strike Group 5 from November 2020 to October 2021.

== Biography ==
A native of Wilton, Iowa, Pennington graduated from the United States Naval Academy in 1989 with a B.S. degree in economics. He later earned a masters degree from Old Dominion University. He also attended the Harvard Kennedy School, Air Command and Staff College, and Joint Forces Staff College.

Pennington was designated a naval aviator in 1991 and has deployed 10 times with operational tours in F-14 and FA-18 aircraft supporting Operations Southern Watch, Allied Force, Enduring Freedom, Iraqi Freedom, New Dawn, Inherent Resolve, and Freedom Sentinel. Early assignments include Fighter Squadron (VF) 154 forward deployed to NAF Atsugi, Japan, the Carrier Air Wing (CVW) Eight Staff, and Fighter Squadron (VF) 14. He later returned to command Strike Fighter Squadron (VFA) 14. Additional sea tours include executive officer, USS George H.W. Bush; commanding officer, USS Blue Ridge; commanding officer, USS George H.W. Bush; and commander, Carrier Strike Group Five and Task Force 70 homeported in Yokosuka, Japan.

== Dates of promotion ==
Rank	Date
Rear Admiral (lower half)	August 1, 2018
Rear Admiral	June 1, 2022

Military offices
Preceded by Andrew Loiselle	Commanding Officer of USS George H.W. Bush (CVN-77); 2015–2018	Succeeded by Sean R. Bailey
Preceded by William C. McQuilkin	Director of Plans, Policy, and Integration of the United States Navy; 2018–2020	Succeeded by Thomas R. Williams II
Preceded by George Wikoff	Commander of Carrier Strike Group 5; 2020–2021	Succeeded by Michael P. Donnelly
Preceded by John V. Fuller	Deputy Commander of the United States Tenth Fleet; 2021–2022	Succeeded by Mike Bernacchi
Preceded by Brook J. Leonard	Chief of Staff of the United States Space Command; 2022–2025	Succeeded by Sean Bailey
