= Red Hill Underground Fuel Storage Facility =

Military fuel storage facility in Hawaii

Red Hill
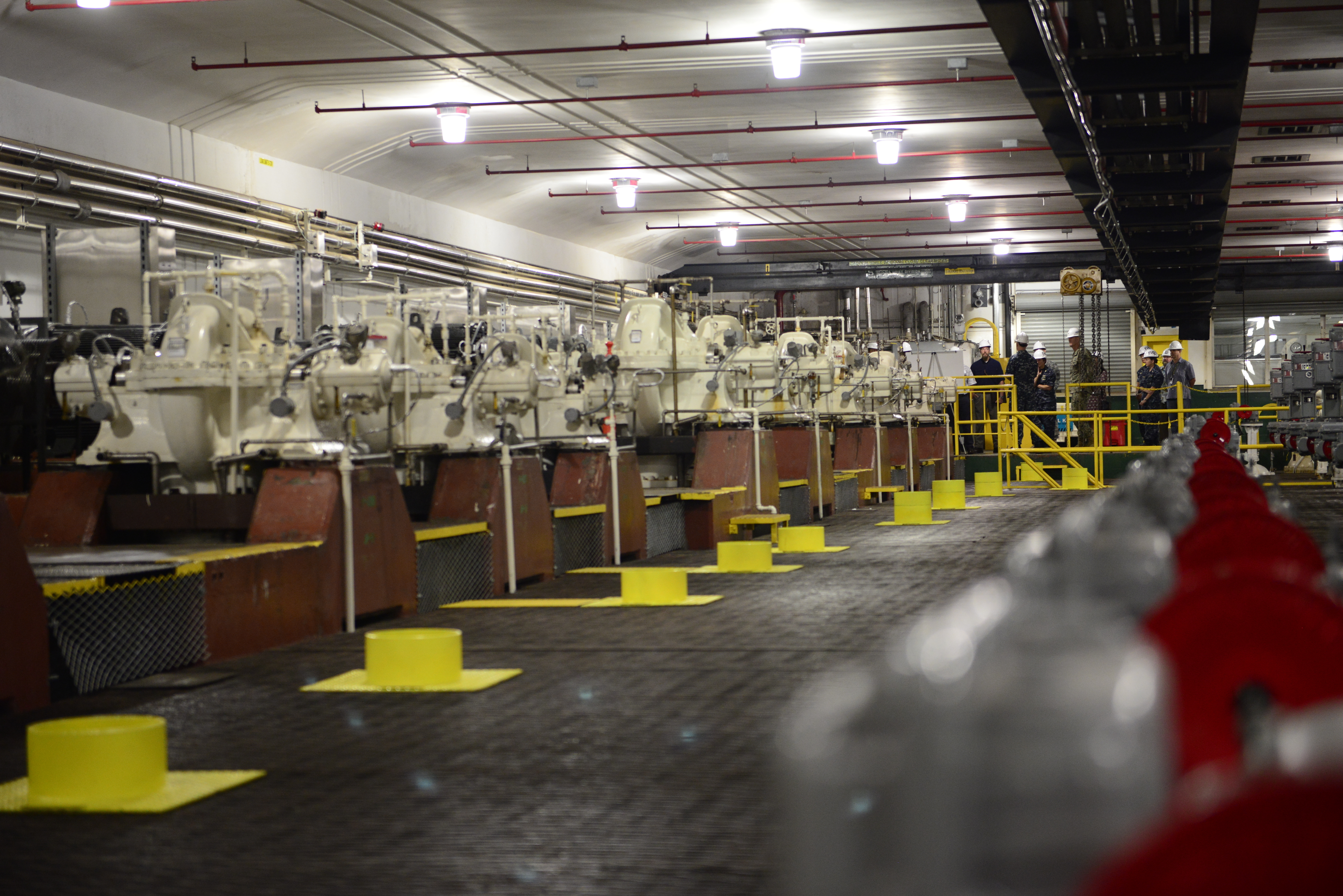
- The interior in 2016
- Interactive map of Red Hill
- Official name: Red Hill Bulk Fuel Storage Facility
- Location: Honolulu, Hawaii, U.S.
- Purpose: Store fuel for use at Joint Base Pearl Harbor–Hickam to refuel ships, aircraft, etc.
- Status: In use
- Construction began: 1940
- Opening date: 1943
- Construction cost: $42.2 million (1943)
- Owner: United States Government
- Operator: U.S. Navy
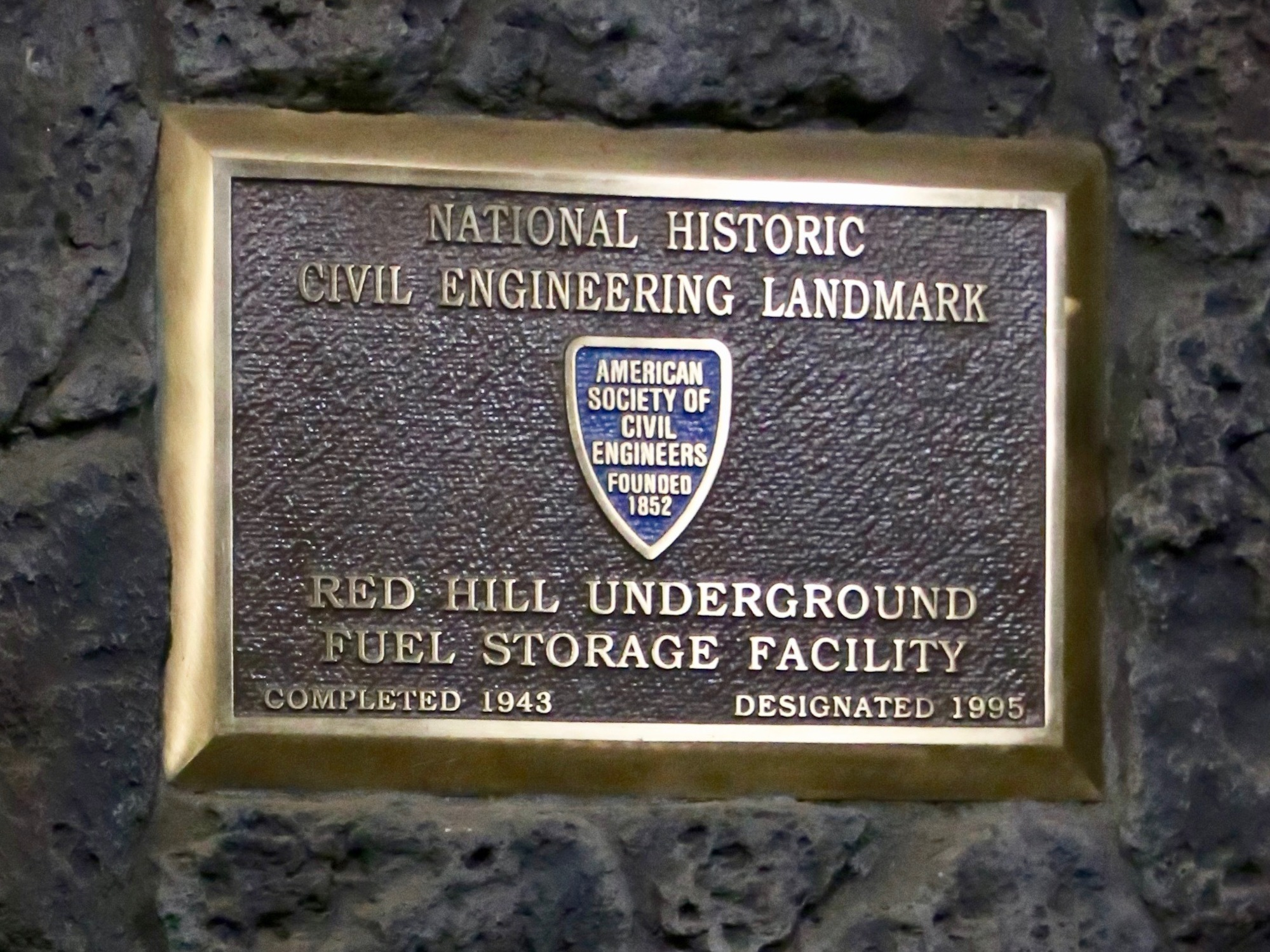
- Civil Engineering Landmark Designated in 1995 American Society of Civil Engineers

The Red Hill Bulk Fuel Storage Facility is a military fuel storage facility in Hawaii. Operated by the United States Navy, Red Hill supports U.S. military operations in the Pacific.

As of March 7, 2022, the Department of Defense announced the planned closure of the Red Hill facility, due to reduced military need and water contamination issues.

== Description ==
Unlike any other facility in the United States, the Red Hill Underground Fuel Storage Facility can store up to 250 million gallons of fuel. It consists of 20 steel-lined underground storage tanks encased in concrete, and built into cavities that were mined inside of Red Hill. Each tank has a storage capacity of approximately 12.5 million gallons.

The Red Hill tanks are connected to three gravity-fed pipelines that run 2.5 miles inside a tunnel to fueling piers at Pearl Harbor. Each of the 20 tanks at Red Hill measures 100 feet in diameter and is 250 feet in height.

The Joint Task Force Red Hill was established on September 30, 2022, for the purpose of "safely and expeditiously" defueling the Red Hill Bulk Fuel Storage facility. Secretary of Defense Lloyd Austin said: "Defueling and closing Red Hill is the right thing to do – for our service members, our families, the people of Hawaii, the environment, and our nation." The commander of the Joint Task Force is Vice. Adm. John F.G. Wade.

Red Hill is located under a volcanic mountain ridge near Honolulu. It was declared a Historic Civil Engineering Landmark by the American Society of Civil Engineers in 1995.

== History ==
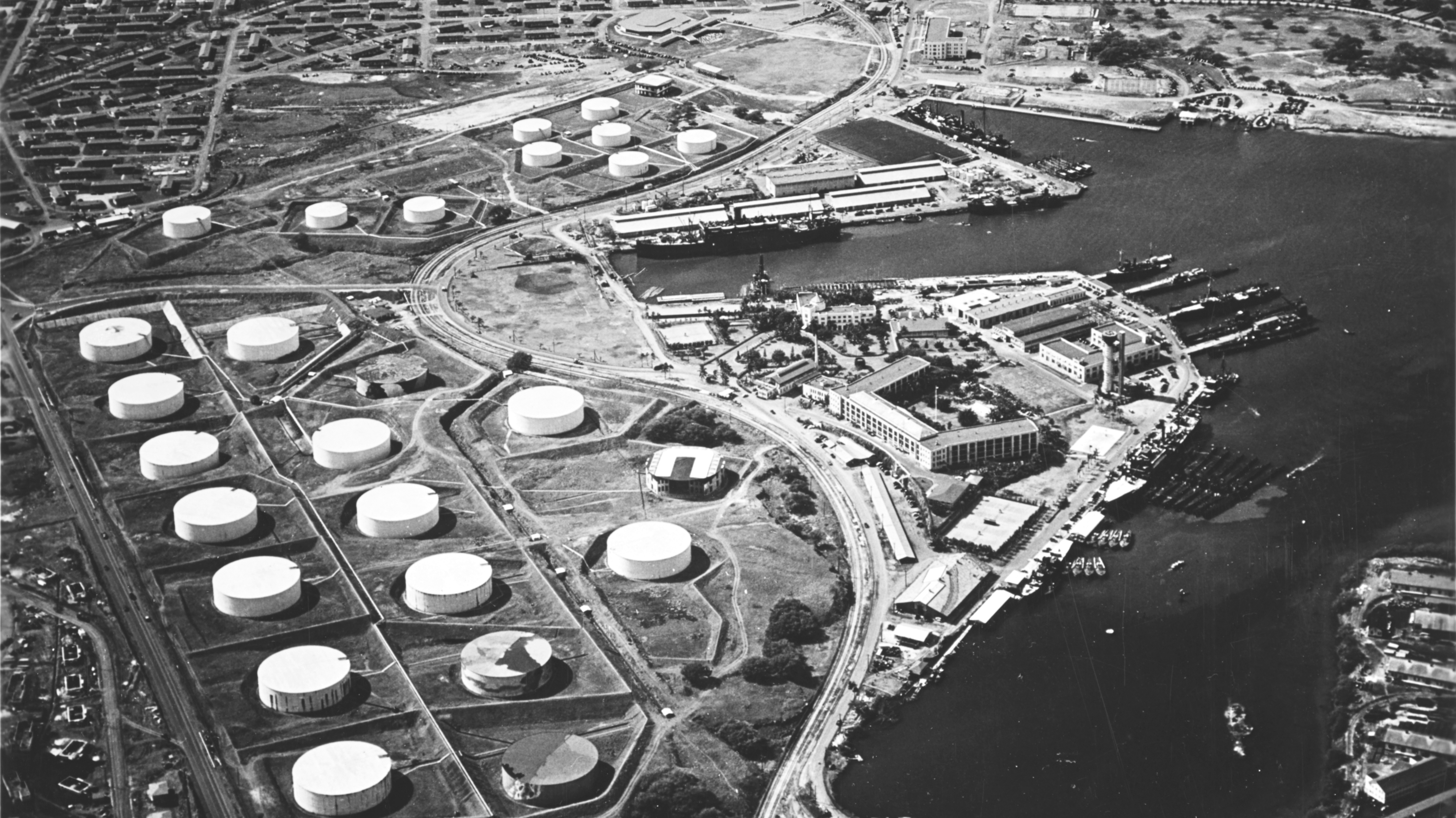
Above-ground fuel storage tanks at Pearl Harbor prior to the construction of Red Hill.

Before the United States entered World War II, the Roosevelt Administration became concerned about the vulnerability of the many above-ground fuel storage tanks at Pearl Harbor. In 1940 it decided to build a new underground facility that would store more fuel and be safe from an enemy aerial attack.

The Red Hill site would provide unprecedented flow rates of fuel due to its elevation. In addition, the site's unique geological characteristics, including basalt rock, could support such large tanks. Federal, local government and contracted engineers and geologists performed many surveys of the Koolau Range and eventually reached a consensus on Red Hill as the best choice because it is mostly homogeneous basalt.

Their original plan was to build four large underground tanks. These would be horizontal, as all underground tanks were at the time. However, during the planning process, the engineers decided to build the tanks vertically because construction and excavation could occur simultaneously. This was possible because a vertical shaft drilled through the centerline of the tank would allow excavated rock to funnel down onto a series of conveyor belts in the lower access tunnel.

Planners and engineers began the process by acquiring the real estate, staging equipment and materials, and building a work camp. The 3,900 workers worked around the clock, seven days a week, to complete the project. Construction started by excavating the vertical shafts for all 20 tanks concurrently with mining of the upper access and lower access tunnels. The tunnels were aligned directly in the middle of the parallel rows of shafts. Once perpendicular to the shafts, cross tunnels were mined to connect the shafts to the main access tunnels. For constructability and safety reasons (cave-ins), the upper domes needed to be built first, so the miners excavated individual ring tunnels around the circumference of each of the future upper dome bases. They then scoped out the area of the domes and proceeded to construct the steel framing, steel liner and rebar. Workers continuously poured concrete that ranged in thickness from two feet at the crown to eight feet at the base. Once the concrete cured, it was pre-stressed by pressure grouting the area between the concrete and the basalt.

Upon completion of the excavation, workers erected a steel tower in the center to the full height of 250 feet. The tower served to support concrete chutes, pipes, booms, and other equipment necessary to install the piping, concrete, and steel linings. Workers then began to erect the steel liner and rebar incrementally so that they could pour concrete in stages. Concrete was poured continually and workers had to remove wooden shoring as concrete filled. They injected pressurized grout to pre-stress the concrete by filling void space between the concrete and the gunite. When finished, the tanks were tested by slowly filling them with water while laborers in boats inspected the entire surface area of the steel liner.

The Japanese attack on Pearl Harbor took place during the construction of Red Hill, and eight construction workers were killed by strafing aircraft. A portion of the site was used to bury hundreds of bodies of Navy personnel killed in the attack. Those not claimed by families were moved to the National Memorial Cemetery of the Pacific when it opened after the war.

== Environmental problems ==
=== 2014 fuel spill ===
In December 2013, contractors completed a three-year, scheduled, routine maintenance upgrade on tank 5 at Red Hill. This work included cleaning, inspecting, and repairing anomalies. At the conclusion of the overhaul in January 2014, the Navy initiated a Return to Service evolution, refilling the tank with jet fuel (JP-8). During this process, the inventory management alarms sounded. Red Hill operators first assumed the alarm system was malfunctioning or producing false positives because the tank was recently overhauled and should not have been leaking. Eventually, the U.S. Navy determined the alarms were not false and reported a 27,000 gallon jet fuel loss to the Hawaii Department of Health and the U.S. Environmental Protection Agency.

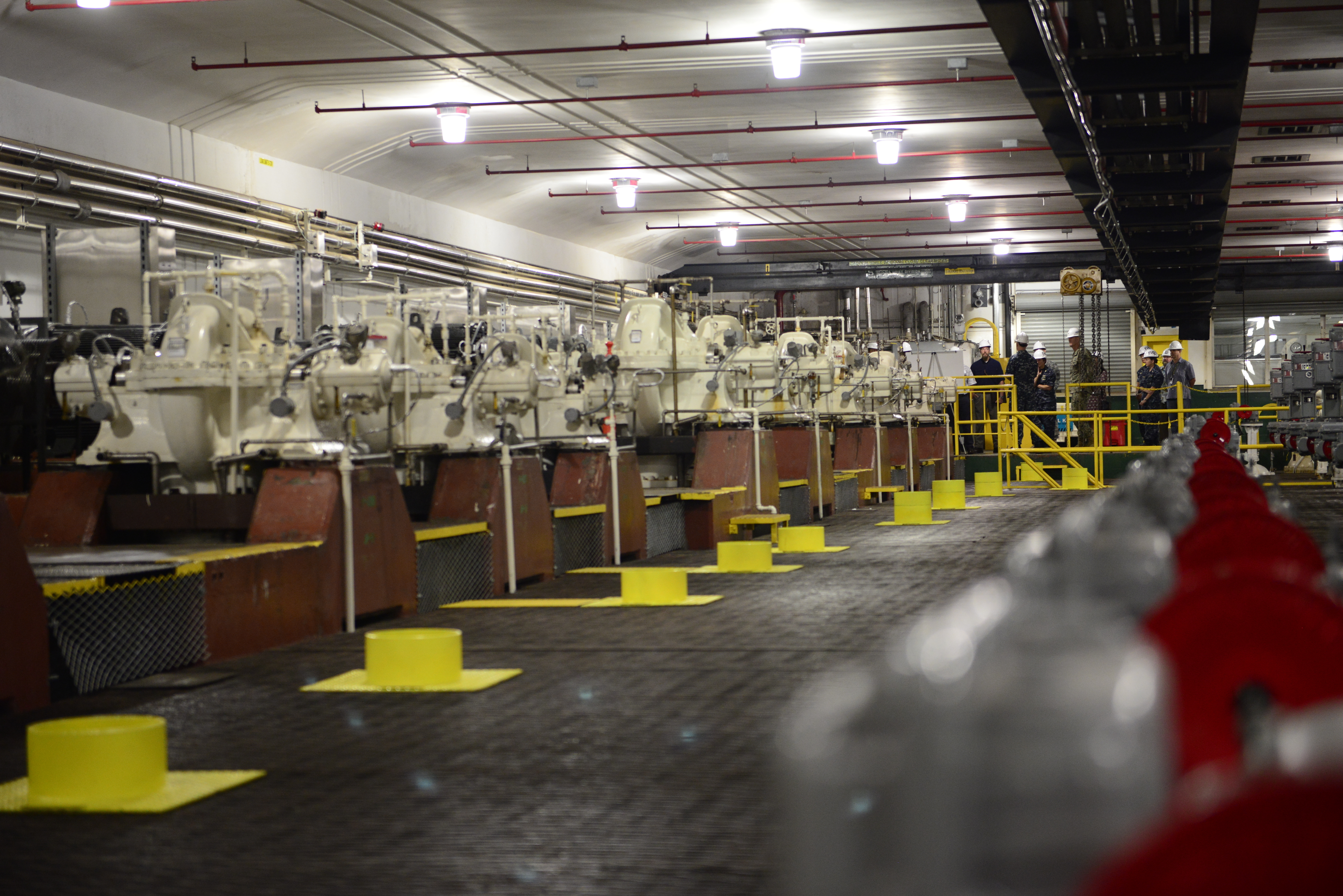
Inside Red Hill Fuel Storage Facility.

Subsequent analysis indicated that the leak was the result of faulty work and poor quality control by the Navy's contractor, compounded by a lack of quality assurance oversight by the Navy, as well as operator error. As a consequence, the Navy, in accordance with the Administrative Order on Consent, significantly improved the tank inspection, repair, and maintenance processes in their report submitted on October 11, 2016.

Regarding the 27,000 gallons of fuel, the Navy's first concern was the possibility of fuel entering the drinking water supply. The nearest drinking water shaft (operated by the Navy) is 3,000 feet away and is one source that provides water to the military families at Joint Base Pearl Harbor–Hickam. The next closest drinking water shaft, Halawa shaft, which is located approximately one mile away, provides drinking water to the city of Honolulu.

While all test results for contamination at the Navy drinking water shaft have come back well within safe drinking water standards and results from the Halawa shaft have shown no jet fuel related contaminants, the Navy, the Environmental Protection Agency, and the Hawaii Department of Health conducted studies to evaluate groundwater conditions and any potential impacts to groundwater resources in the area. Results taken in and around Tank 5 indicated a spike in levels of hydrocarbons in soil vapor and groundwater. Drinking water monitoring results confirmed compliance with federal and state safety standards for drinking water both before and after the January 2014 release.

Following the tank 5 release in 2014, the Navy increased the testing frequency for drinking water and groundwater wells. The Navy now sends drinking water samples every quarter to certified independent laboratories that use EPA methods to analyze for contamination.

The newest groundwater monitoring well was scheduled to come on line by the end of April 2017. Commander Navy Region Hawaii and Naval Surface Group Middle Pacific, Admiral Fuller noted, "there are have been detects of trace amounts of fuel constituents near the Navy drinking water shaft." This is in the groundwater, not the drinking water. "We're talking 17 parts per billion, as opposed to zero. The misperception is that there's a spike, but the numbers were small enough that the testing facility had to estimate the amount because the numbers were so low. The 17 parts per billion is below the threshold of something we should be concerned about, which is 100 parts per billion."

=== 2021 water contamination ===
On November 20, 2021, another jet fuel leak at the Red Hill Bulk Fuel Storage Facility contaminated the Joint Base Pearl Harbor–Hickam water system, which supplies about 10,000 civilian and military households and schools. In December 2021, more than 1,000 military families stationed in Hawaii had been forced from their homes after apparent jet fuel contamination in the water supply at Joint Base Pearl Harbor–Hickam. About 2,700 homes in 10 communities were in the affected area. Residents had complained about foul-smelling tap water bearing an oily sheen, as well as symptoms such as nausea, diarrhea and intense headaches. Secretary of the Navy Carlos Del Toro told residents, “I deeply apologize to each and every one of you and to the people of Hawaii that this incident may have been destructive to your lives." It was not until May 2022, that the CDC published a study of self-reported symptoms which lasted more than a month.

Creation of Joint Task Force Red Hill

On September 30, 2022, Joint Task Force Red Hill was officially stood up for the purpose of safely and expeditiously defueling the facility through coordination with State and Federal stakeholders in order to set conditions for closure while continuing to rebuild trust with the State of Hawaii and the local community of Oahu. The Joint Task Force has participated and created numerous community forums (such as the defueling information sharing forum) in order to keep the public and key stakeholders informed of the repair progress that is required to defuel the facility. The commander of the Joint Task Force is Vice. Adm. John F.G. Wade.

== Groundwater Protection Plan ==
Between 2006 and 2017, the Department of Defense had spent more than $200 million on continual technological modernization and environmental testing at Red Hill. The facility monitors the fuel level in each tank to one sixteenth of an inch and controls the movement of fuel throughout the facility. If a tank level decreases by as little as half an inch, alarms will sound in Red Hill's control room, which is continuously staffed.

Many entities, including the U.S. Navy, University of Hawaii, and U.S. Geological Survey, study the movement of groundwater in and around Red Hill. Navy modeling to date indicates any fuel constituents in the groundwater are “not likely” to reach any of Oahu's drinking water sources.

Timeline of actions taken by the U.S. Navy:

- 2005: Quarterly groundwater monitoring and sampling at the Red Hill Facility.
- 2007: Environmental investigation to collect additional data for groundwater and contaminant fate (how and where it disperses) and transport modeling in order to provide better understanding and forecasting of potential impacts; contingency plan to protect drinking water well located closest to Red Hill.
- 2008: The Groundwater Protection Plan (subsequently updated in 2009 and 2014) to mitigate risk associated with inadvertent fuel releases from the tanks.

It included the following provisions:

- A tank inspection and maintenance program
- A soil vapor monitoring program to support primary leak detection processes
- A groundwater sampling and risk assessment reporting program
- A long-term groundwater monitoring program that provides warning of potential risk to human health
- Responsibilities and response actions that will be performed should groundwater data exceed Hawaii Department of Health environmental action levels.
- Periodic market surveys to evaluate best available leak detection technologies for large, field-constructed fuel storage facilities.

=== Administrative Order on Consent ===
The Administrative Order on Consent is a binding legal agreement administered by the Environmental Protection Agency. The order mandates the corrective actions to be taken in the wake of an environmental violation. Representatives from the Environmental Protection Agency, Hawaii Department of Health, U.S. Navy, and Defense Logistics Agency signed the order for Red Hill in September 2015. It acknowledges the shared responsibility to protect Oahu's drinking water supply and maintain Red Hill as a strategically vital resource.

The Environmental Protection Agency and Hawaii Department of Health negotiated the administrative order with the U.S. Navy and the Defense Logistics Agency in response to the January 2014 fuel release from the facility. The order required the Navy and Defense Logistics Agency to take actions, subject to approval by the Department of Health and the Environmental Protection Agency, to address fuel releases and implement infrastructure improvements to protect human health and the environment. The order requires the Navy to evaluate and improve procedures and practices to maintain the integrity of the tanks, evaluate and implement structural upgrades to the tanks, and to use the best technology available to detect leaks. The order also requires the Navy to determine the overall risk the facility poses to the surrounding environment.

The document prescribes actions the U.S. Navy must take, along with deadlines for completing each task. There are eight sections:

1. Overall project maintenance guidance
2. Tank inspection, repair, and maintenance
3. Potential tank upgrade review procedures
4. Leak detection and testing
5. Current and future corrosion and metal fatigue
6. Investigating and remediating past fuel releases
7. Development of future groundwater protection and evaluation
8. Risk and vulnerability assessment of Red Hill

The Hawaii Department of Health hosted a second meeting to address the document in May 2016. Participants included the Defense Logistics Agency and Environmental Protection Agency as well as subject matter experts from the University of Hawaii, the Honolulu Board of Water Supply and their consultants, the State Department of Land and Natural Resources, and the U.S. Geological Survey. The Environmental Protection Agency and Hawaii Department of Health hired a team of world renowned subject matter experts to assess the entire Red Hill facility and went on record to say that all aspects—to include infrastructure, security measures, and operation practices—currently meet or exceed industry standards.

=== Investigation and remediation ===
The Administrative Order on Consent required the Navy to develop a plan addressing the January 2014 fuel release from Tank #5 as well as plans to address any future releases of fuel. The Navy will evaluate various investigative techniques to determine which are most suitable for determining the extent of contamination in the ground around Red Hill. Each technique will be evaluated in terms of feasibility of implementation and effectiveness in detecting light non-aqueous phase liquid, which refers to fuel floating on top of the groundwater. The Navy will also investigate a number of remediation methods for use in the Red Hill area. The Navy will evaluate methods based on their feasibility of implementation, suitableness for use in fractured basalt geology, and effectiveness in reducing contamination.

In May 2016 the Navy submitted a scope of work to address the investigation and remediation of contamination, modeling and the groundwater monitoring network. On September 15, 2016, the regulatory agencies disapproved this scope of work and requested that the Navy revise the document (review and disapproval letter is available in the additional documents page, see link above). The Navy submitted a revised scope of work on November 5, 2016, which was conditionally approved by the regulatory agencies on December 2, 2016, subject to changes as detailed in the conditional approval letter (letter is available for viewing below). On January 5, 2017, the Navy submitted a new version of the Section 6 & 7 Scope of Work, available below, that addressed all of the issues noted in the Conditional Approval letter.

=== Other reactions ===
In 2020, the Honolulu Civil Beat reported that even though Navy and state health officials have known about the groundwater contamination since the late 1990s, and generated thousands of pages of reports on the topic — officials from Honolulu's Board of Water Supply say they were never informed about the problems until after this most recent spill. The Honolulu Board of Water Supply is responsible for purveying the county's drinking water.

"I'm very concerned about the situation," said Ernest Lau, manager and chief engineer for the Honolulu Board of Water Supply. He stressed that the nearby aquifers are critical to Oahu's drinking water supply.

The Environmental Protection Agency says millions of gallons of fuel stored in a military facility under Red Hill is unlikely to reach the water supply. "It's very unlikely that that contamination, that mass we're seeing under the tanks, gets anywhere near the Board of Water Supply wells," Steven Linder, of the Environmental Protection Agency, told the state Health Department's Underground Fuel Tank Advisory Committee.

The Sierra Club of Hawaii launched a "Fix it up or shut it down" petition and has also demanded that the Hawaii Department of Health, the Environmental Protection Agency, and the U.S. Navy:

- Install sufficient "sentinel" monitoring wells to guard public drinking water sources from possible contamination currently in the aquifer,
- Locate the fuel that has already leaked from the storage facility and clean it up,
- Install genuine leak prevention systems, not only leak detection systems, that will guarantee there will be no future leaks from this facility.

According to military contracting announcements, Joint Base Pearl Harbor–Hickam has contracted with two corporations to address environmental problems at Red Hill: AECOM has been in charge of investigating and remediating releases, as well as protecting and evaluating groundwater, while APTIM (known as CB&I prior to 2017) has been in charge cleaning, inspecting, and repairing fuel storage tanks.

In January 2025, it was reported that the Navy and Defense Logistics Agency were fined $5,000 by the Environmental Protection Agency for not attending a Red Hill Community Representation Initiative meeting, as required by a consent order.
