= Albert E. Jarrell =

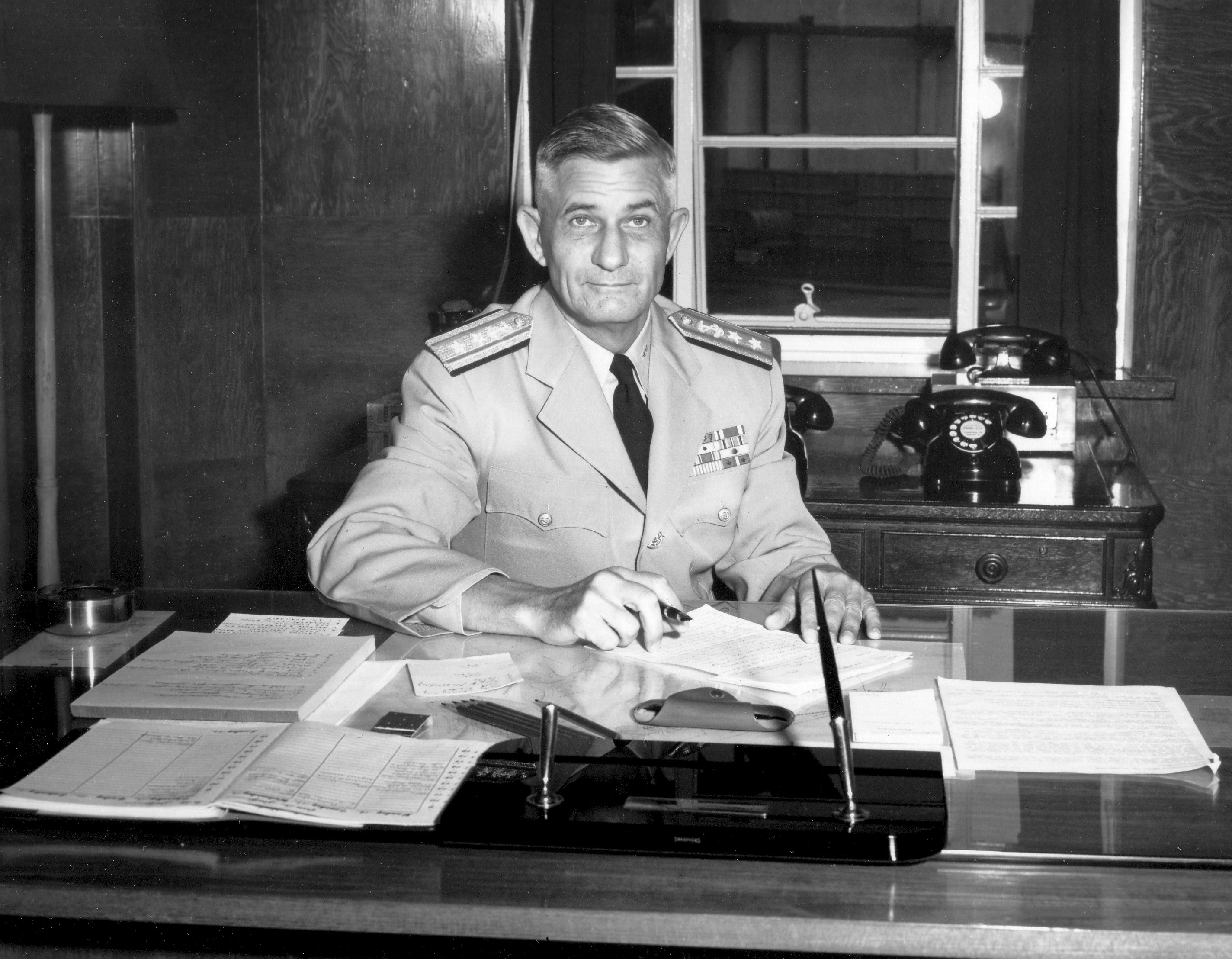
- Jarrell in 1957
- Born: August 1, 1901; Rome, Georgia
- Died: April 23, 1977 (aged 75); Sedona, Arizona
- Burial place: LaGrange, Georgia
- Military career
- Allegiance: United States
- Branch: United States Navy
- Service years: 1925–1959
- Rank: Vice Admiral
- Conflicts: World War II - Pacific Korea

Albert Edmondson Jarrell (August 1, 1901 – April 23, 1977) was a commissioned officer in the United States Navy. Jarrell retired September 30, 1959 with the rank of Vice Admiral.

== Biography ==
Jarrell was the son of Henry and Lola (Edmondson) Jarrell. Born in Rome, Georgia, Jarrell soon moved to LaGrange, Georgia, where he grew up. He was appointed to the US Naval Academy in 1921. Upon graduation in 1925 he went on to serve 34 years active duty with 21 of those years in foreign and/or sea service. In 1930 Jarrell met Anna Christine Holm, daughter of Dr. and Mrs. Edger Holm, in Eureka, California. They were married January 24, 1931 and went on to have three children, Joan, Lewis and Henry. Jarrell retired with the rank of Vice Admiral in 1959 in Coronado, California. He soon moved to Ramona, California where he became active in local and state politics and charities. In 1972 Jarrell moved to Sedona, Arizona where he continued his political and charitable endeavors, which included running for State Senator. Jarrell died suddenly of a heart attack in his home in Sedona on April 23, 1977.

Jarrell had three siblings: William Franklin Jarrell, Corinne Jarrell, and Henry Thompson Jarrell. Henry was a captain in the United States Navy and served more than 21 years on active duty.

== United States Navy ==
In addition to his years at the U. S. Naval Academy, Jarrell received advanced schooling from the Army Chemical Warfare School in 1925, Naval Engineering from the Naval Academy in 1931-32, and a bachelor's degree in Naval Engineering from the University of California in 1932-33. Jarrell was a line officer, serving on a variety of ships and holding many commands and foreign assignments: Engineer Member, U.S. Naval Mission to Brazil 1941-43

Commander, Destroyer Division 42 (World War II - New Guinea, Biak, Morotai, Leyte) 1944

Commander, Destroyer Squadron 55 (World War II - Luzon, Formosa, China, Tokyo, Okinawa) 1944-45

U. S. Naval Attaché and Naval Attaché for Air, Mexico City 1946-48

District Intelligence Officer, 13th Naval District, Seattle, Washington 1948-49

Chief of Staff to Commander, Destroyers, Pacific Fleet, San Diego, California 1949

Commander, U. S. Navy Mine Countermeasures Station Panama City Florida 1949-50

Commander, Transport Division 11 (Korean War) 1950

Chief of Staff to Commander, Destroyers Atlantic Fleet, Newport, Rhode Island 1951-52

Professor of Naval Science, Rice University, Houston, Texas 1952-53

Commander, Destroyer Flotilla 1 (concurrently, Member, then Senior Member, UN Military Armistice Commission, Korea) 1953-54

Commander, Amphibious Training Command Pacific, Coronado, California 1955-56

Commander Fleet Activities Yokosuka, Japan 1956-57

Commander, Naval Forces Korea (CNFK) 1957-58

Commander, Training Command Pacific Fleet, San Diego, California 1958-59

=== Awards and decorations ===
Navy Cross

Legion of Merit with Gold Star, Oak Leaf, and Combat “V”

Yangtze Service Medal

American Defense Service Medal

American Campaign

Asiatic Pacific Campaign Medal

Philippine Liberation Ribbon

World War II Victory Medal

Korean Service Medal

United Nations Medal

The ROK Order of Military Merit Taegeuk by President Syngman Rhee

The Order of the Southern Cross by Brazil

Navy Expeditionary Medal

Navy Commendation Medal
