= Mark A. Schafer =

U.S. Navy admiral

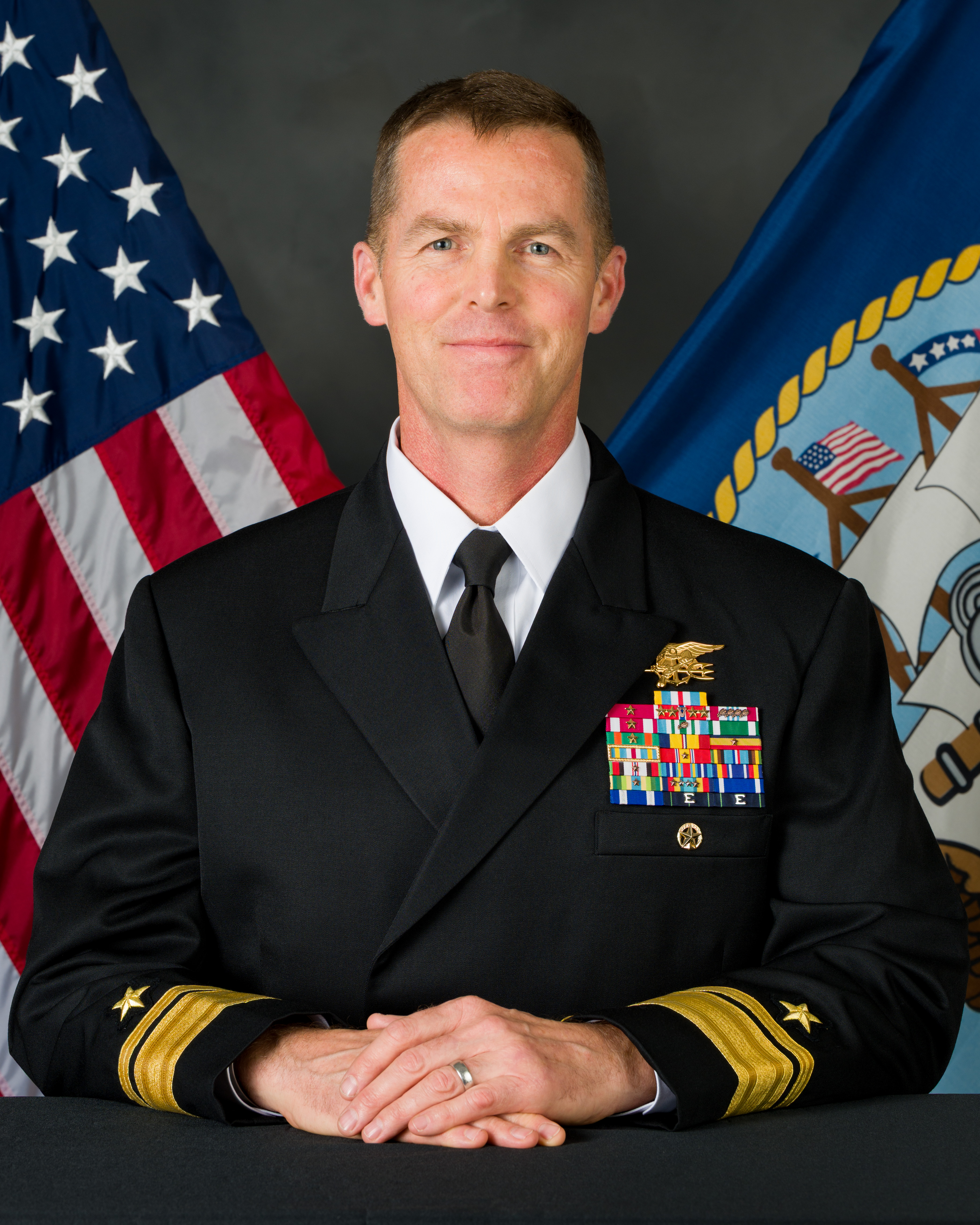
- Military career
- Branch: United States Navy
- Service years: 1994–present
- Rank: Rear Admiral
- Commands: U.S. Naval Forces Korea; Naval Special Warfare Group TWO; NSW Basic Training Command

Mark A. Schafer is a United States Navy rear admiral who currently serves as Commanding General, Special Operations Joint Task Force-South, United States Southern Command . Schafer recently served as Commander, United States Naval Forces Korea from Sept 2021 to Sept 2023.

== Navy career ==
Schafer attended the United States Naval Academy, graduating in 1994 and was commissioned as an Ensign in the U.S. Navy. Schafer volunteered for Basic Underwater Demolition/SEAL training (BUD/S) at Naval Amphibious Base Coronado. After six months of training, Schafer graduated with BUD/S class 197 in 1995. His first operational assignment was with SEAL Team TWO as assistant platoon commander. Following SEAL Tactical Training (STT) and completion of six month probationary period, he received the 1130 designator as a Naval Special Warfare Officer, entitled to wear the Special Warfare insignia. Schafer later served as platoon commander with SEAL Team FOUR. In 2001 Schafer volunteered for assignment to Naval Special Warfare Development Group (NSWDG) in Damneck, Virginia and completed a specialized selection and training course. Schafer served as troop commander till 2004 where he planned, rehearsed and operated during classified exercises and operations including deployments to Afghanistan during Operation Enduring Freedom. Schafer earned a master's degree in Business Administration at the Naval Postgraduate School in 2009. Schafer's Naval Special Warfare (NSW) staff and command assignments include Operations officer, Joint Special Operations Command; Executive officer and Squadron Commander, Tactical Development and Evaluation Squadron THREE, NSWDG; Director of Selection and Training, NSWDG; Commanding officer, Naval Special Warfare Basic Training Command; Deputy Commander, Naval Special Warfare Development Group; Commanding officer, Naval Special Warfare Group TWO; Director of Operations J3, Joint Special Operations Command.

== Awards and decorations ==
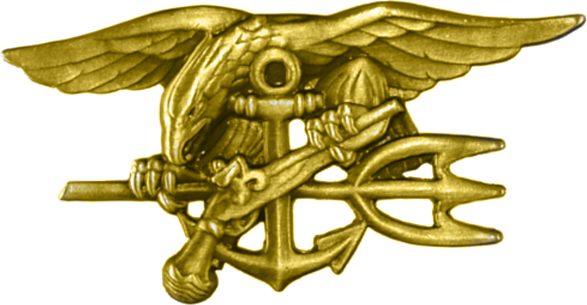

Badge	SEAL Insignia		
1st Row		Defense Superior Service Medal	
2nd Row	Legion of Merit Medal w/ gold award star	Bronze Star with Combat "V" and 4 award stars	Defense Meritorious Service Medal w/ 4 oak leaf cluster
3rd Row	Meritorious Service Medal w/ 1 award star	Joint Service Commendation Medal	Navy and Marine Corps Commendation Medal
4th Row	Combat Action Ribbon	Navy Presidential Unit Citation w/ 1 bronze service star	Joint Meritorious Unit Award
5th Row	Navy Unit Commendation	Navy Meritorious Unit Commendation	
6th Row		National Defense Service Medal w/ 1 service star	Armed Forces Expeditionary Medal
7th Row	Afghanistan Campaign Medal w/ campaign star		Global War on Terrorism Expeditionary Medal
8th Row	Global War on Terrorism Service Medal	Sea Service Deployment Ribbon w/ 7 service stars	Overseas Service Ribbon
9th row	NATO Medal for the former Yugoslavia	Rifle Marksmanship Medal	Pistol Marksmanship Medal
Badge			
Badge	Naval Parachutist insignia		
