= John F.G. Wade =

U.S. Navy admiral

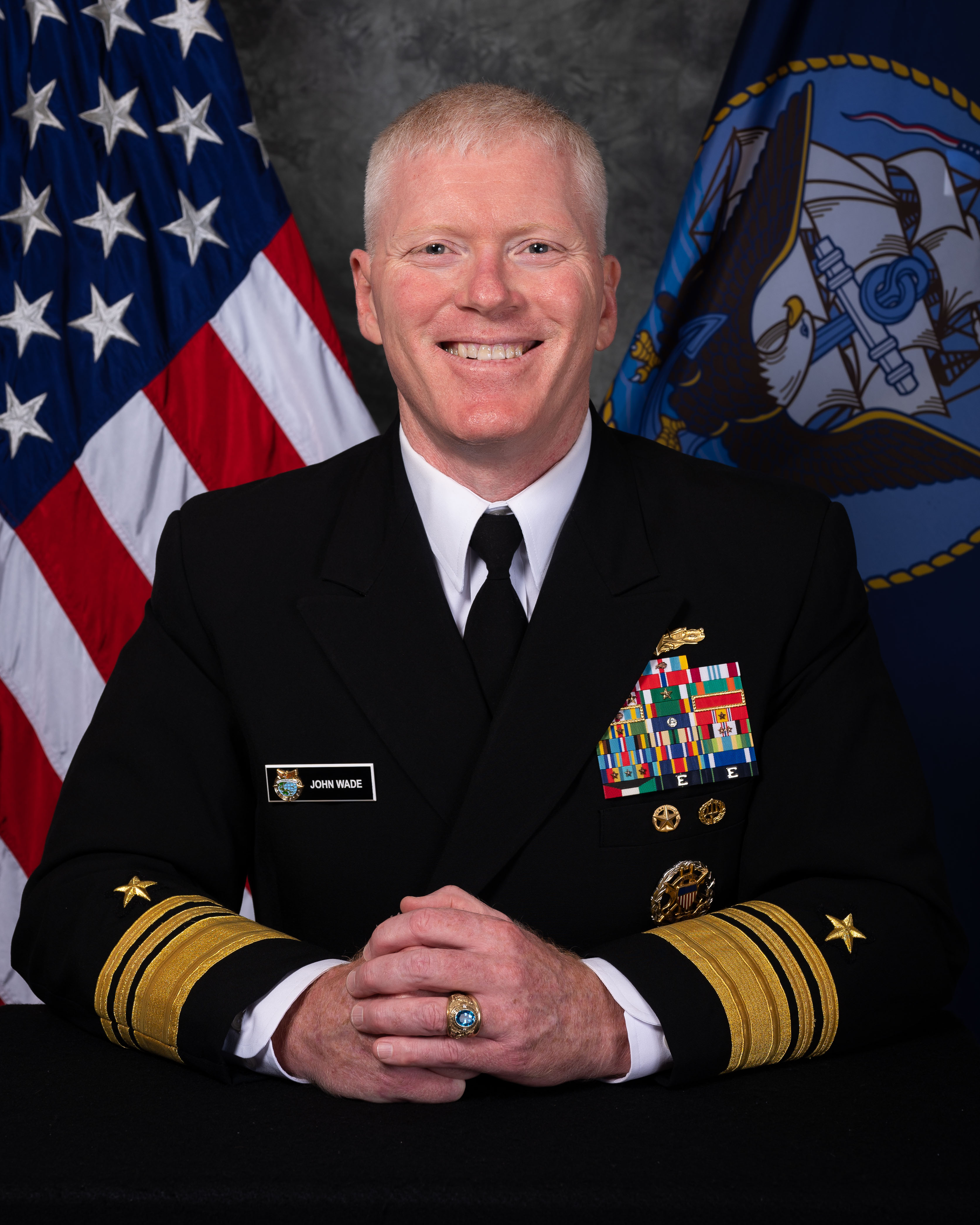
- Born: 4 December 1968 (age 57); Port Washington, New York, U.S.
- Military career
- Allegiance: United States
- Branch: United States Navy
- Service years: 1990–present
- Rank: Vice Admiral
- Commands: United States Third Fleet; Joint Task Force Red Hill; Carrier Strike Group 12; Naval Surface and Mine Warfighting Development Center; Destroyer Squadron 28; USS Preble (DDG-88); USS Firebolt (PC-10)
- Awards: Defense Superior Service Medal (2); Legion of Merit (4); Bronze Star Medal

John Fredric G. Wade (born 4 December 1968) is a United States Navy vice admiral who has served as commander of the United States Third Fleet since 7 June 2024. He most recently served as the commander of Joint Task Force - Red Hill from 2022 to 2024. He previously served as the director of operations of the United States Indo-Pacific Command from 2020 to 2022.

Wade graduated from the United States Naval Academy in 1990 with a B.S. degree in economics. He later earned a master's degree in information systems technology from the Naval Postgraduate School and a second master's degree in national security strategy from the National War College.

In May 2024, Wade was nominated for assignment as commander of the United States Third Fleet.

In April 2026, Wade was nominated by President Trump to be the Senior Military Assistant to the Secretary of Defense.

== Awards and decorations ==

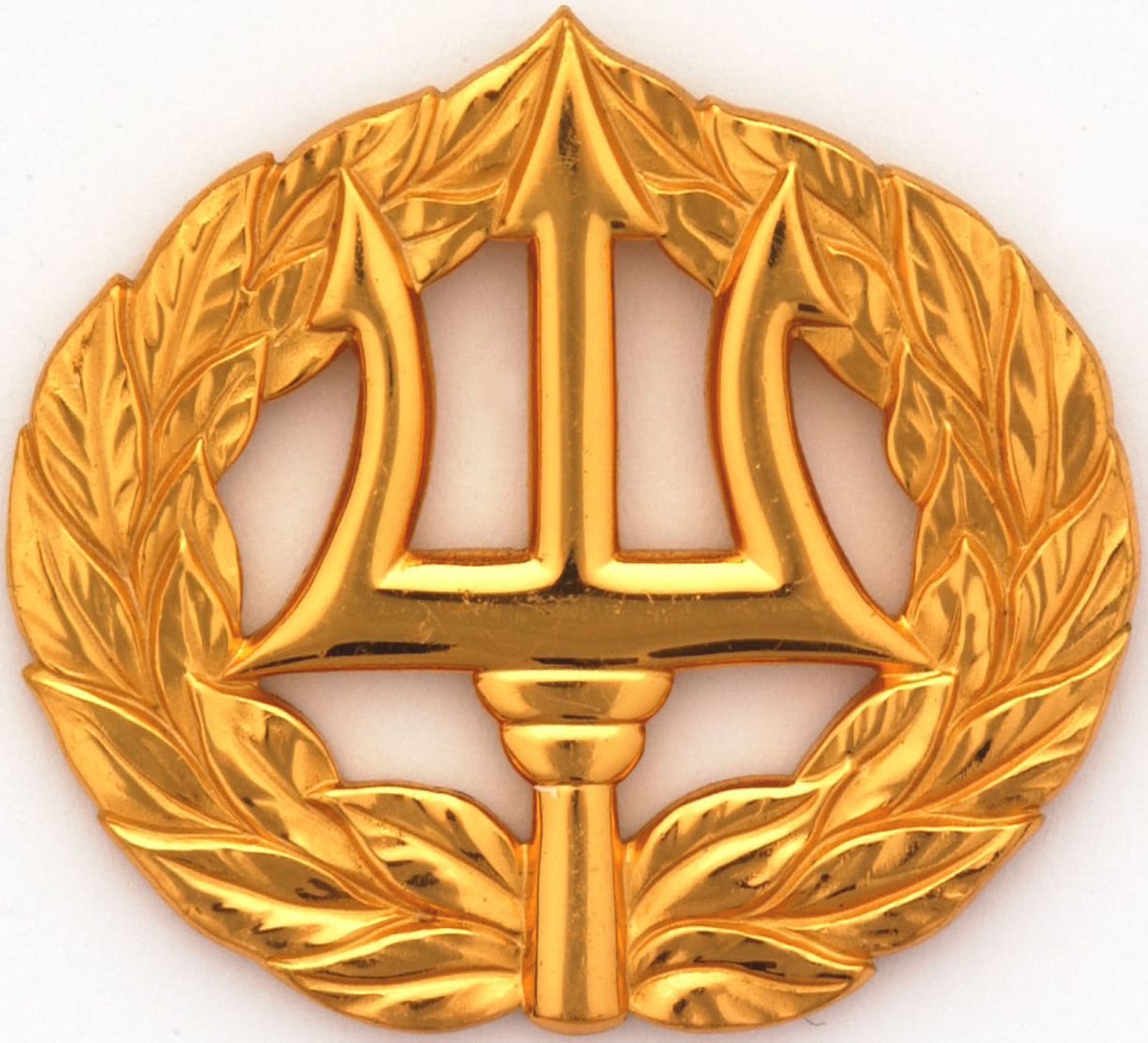

Surface WarfareOfficer Badge
Defense Superior Service Medal
| Legion of Merit with three award stars | Bronze Star Medal | Defense Meritorious Service Medal |
| Meritorious Service Medal with three award stars | Navy and Marine Corps Commendation Medal with award star | Navy and Marine Corps Achievement Medal |
| Joint Meritorious Unit Award | Navy Unit Commendation | Army Meritorious Unit Commendation |
| Navy Meritorious Unit Commendation with bronze service star | Battle Effectiveness Award 4th award | National Defense Service Medal with bronze service star |
| Armed Forces Expeditionary Medal | Southwest Asia Service Medal | Afghanistan Campaign Medal with two bronze service stars |
| Global War on Terrorism Expeditionary Medal | Global War on Terrorism Service Medal | Armed Forces Service Medal |
| Navy and Marine Corps Sea Service Deployment Ribbon with seven service stars | Navy and Marine Corps Overseas Service Ribbon | NATO Medal |
| Kuwait Liberation Medal (Kuwait) | Navy Expert Rifleman Medal | Navy Expert Pistol Shot Medal |
| Command at Sea insignia | | Command Ashore-Project Maneger insignia |
Joint Chiefs of Staff Identification Badge

Military offices
| Preceded by James Kilby | Commander of Naval Surface and Mine Warfighting Development Center; 2016–2018 | Succeeded by Dave Welch |
| Preceded by Kent D. Whalen | Commander of Carrier Strike Group 12; 2018–2019 | Succeeded by Michael E. Boyle |
| Preceded by Douglas G. Perry | Director of Maritime Operations of the United States Fleet Forces Command; 2019–2020 | Succeeded by Fred I. Pyle |
| Preceded by Stephen T. Koehler | Director of Operations of the United States Indo-Pacific Command; 2020–2022 | Succeeded by Jeffrey T. Anderson |
| New command | Commander of Joint Task Force - Red Hill; 2022–2024 | Task force inactivated |
| Preceded by Michael E. Boyle | Commander of the United States Third Fleet; 2022–2024 | Incumbent |
