= Daniel S. Mastagni =

- Born: November 4, 1949 (age 76); Rapid City, South Dakota
- Military career
- Allegiance: United States
- Branch: United States Navy
- Service years: 1972–2005
- Rank: Rear Admiral

Daniel S. Mastagni is a retired rear admiral (lower half) of the United States Navy Reserve who, from July to September 2003 served as Commander Naval Forces Korea.

== Active duty service ==
Mastagni was commissioned from the United States Naval Academy in June 1972; his first assignment was as a junior officer on board the USS Dale (CG-12), prior to assignment at Navy flight school. From 1973 to 1974, Mastagni was attached to Training Air Wing Four and was designated as a Naval Aviator on June 21, 1974 for service in P-3 Orions.

Mastagni's first active flight assignment was with Patrol Squadron 22 (VP-22), stationed at NAS Barbers Point, Hawaii. Through this tour, Mastagni served as a P-3B pilot and was designated as a patrol plane mission commander on September 22, 1976. In 1977, then lieutenant Mastagni was transferred to serve a tour of duty at the United States Air Force Academy as a Navy liaison instructor. He was released from active duty in June 1979 with seven years of active service.

== Reserve duty service ==
After leaving active duty, Mastagni joined the Navy Reserve in the fall of 1979. He affiliated at Naval Air Station New Orleans, Louisiana and was attached to Patrol Squadron 94 (VP-94) as the maintenance and operations officer. Mastagni would later serve as both the executive officer and commanding officer of VP-94.

Mastagni was next assigned to a reserve unit supporting Naval Station Rota, Spain, where he first acted as training officer and later as commanding officer. In 1993, Mastagni assumed command of Naval Reserve Patrol Wing Atlantic, Detachment 0186 (NR PATWINGLANT 0186) and transferred his reserve center affiliation to Norfolk, Virginia. While at Norfolk, he was transferred to command Naval Reserve Det 1086, Naval Air Forces Atlantic (NRNAVAIRLANT 1086).

During his four years of reserve command in Norfolk, Mastagni was the director of exercise control for "Exercise Northern Viking" and senior naval liaison officer for "Joint Exercise 96-1" He also served as the senior naval liaison officer to the headquarters of the Eighth Air Force and further completed the "Reserve Components National Security Course" on July 30, 1993.

In 1997, Mastagni was transferred to Naval Reserve Detachment 111, Commander Seventh Fleet, which operated out of Carswell Air Force Base in Texas. He first served as special assistant and later as executive officer and participated in five western Pacific exercises; twice as the senior Seventh Fleet representative and also as officer-in-charge of Exercise Northwest Pacific. He also served three times as the officer-in-charge of Naval Reserve units attached to Exercise "Ulchi Focus Lens" (held annually in South Korea). In between training periods, Mastagni continued his professional military education and attended the National Defense University, the Industrial College of the Armed Forces, and participated in exchange duty with the Republic of Germany.

In October 2000, Mastagni was attached to a volunteer training Unit (NR VTU 8282) in a non-pay status. In 2001, he was selected for flag rank and was advanced to rear admiral (lower half) in September 2002.

== Flag rank ==
Mastagni's first assignment as a flag officer was as the commander of Naval Reserve Forces Korea (considered the reserve deputy to the active-duty CNFK admiral) with further designation as Commander Naval Shore Forces Korea and Commander Rear Area Seventh Fleet. Mastagni served in this assignment from 2002 to 2003, when he was recalled to active duty to serve as Commander Naval Forces Korea. In the history of CNFK, Mastagni is the only reserve admiral to ever hold the billet; his assumption to the post was to fill the vacant position left by the departure of Rear Admiral Gary R. Jones.

Mastagni was relieved two months later by Rear Admiral Fred Byus. Returning to the status of a reservist, he next transferred to serve as deputy commander, Fleet Air Force Mediterranean and, in 2004, was transferred to become the vice commander, Navy Region Europe. In September 2005, Mastagni retired from the United States Navy with over thirty three years of combined active and reserve service.

== Civilian career ==
Mastagni was born in Rapid City, South Dakota, but spent his youth in Sacramento, California. Mastagni's father, Emil Mastagni, was a retired United States Air Force colonel with service in World War II.

While serving in the Navy Reserve, Mastagni worked as a professional airline pilot for Continental Airlines. As of 2006, Mastagni resides in the vicinity of Grapevine, Texas.

== Summary of service ==
=== Dates of rank ===
Ensign	Lieutenant Junior Grade	Lieutenant	Lieutenant Commander	Commander	Captain
O-1	O-2	O-3	O-4	O-5	O-6
June 7, 1972	June 7, 1974	April 1, 1976	October 1, 1981	August 1, 1987	August 1, 1993

Rear admiral (lower half)
O-7
September 1, 2002

=== Awards and decorations ===

- Naval Aviator Badge
- Legion of Merit
- Meritorious Service Medal (w/3 gold award stars)
- Navy Commendation Medal
- Coast Guard Meritorious Unit Commendation (w/Operational Distinguishing Device)
- Navy Battle "E" Ribbon
- Global War on Terrorism Service Medal
- Korea Defense Service Medal
- National Defense Service Medal (w/2 bronze service stars)
- Armed Forces Reserve Medal (w/silver hourglass device)
- Special Operations Service Ribbon
- Sea Service Deployment Ribbon
- Overseas Service Ribbon
- Navy Pistol Marksmanship Ribbon
- Navy Rifle Marksmanship Ribbon
- Air Force Small Arms Expert Marksmanship Ribbon

Citations for Admiral Mastagni include:

Legion of Merit

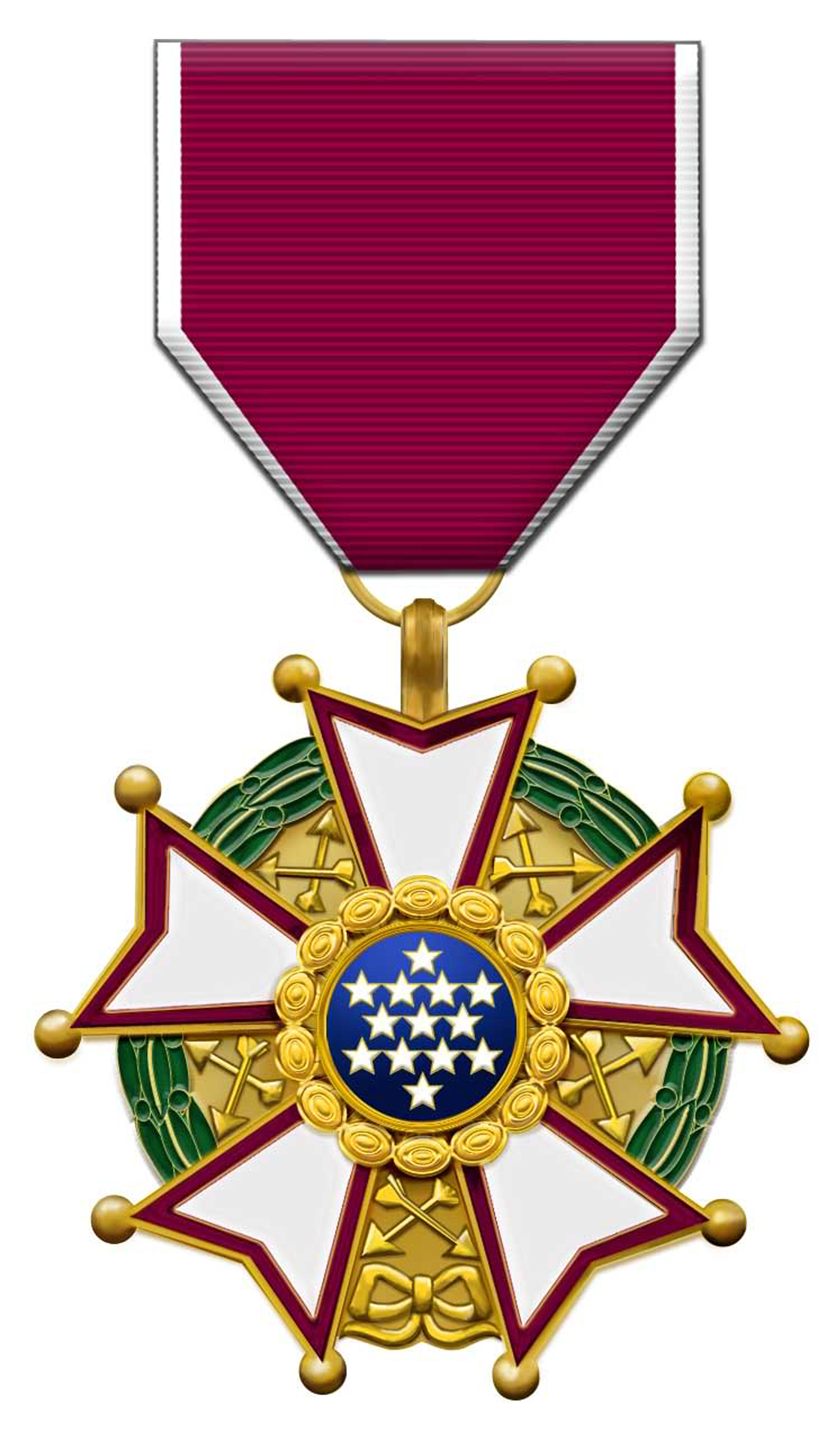

For exceptional meritious conduct in the performance of outstanding services to the United States of America during the period August 1997 to September 2003. During this period, Rear Admiral Daniel S. Mastagni performed duties under the authority of the United States Seventh Fleet and served on active duty as the Commander Naval Forces Korea. Given this 15th day of December 2003; For the Secretary of the Navy: Walter F. Doran

Meritorious Service Medal

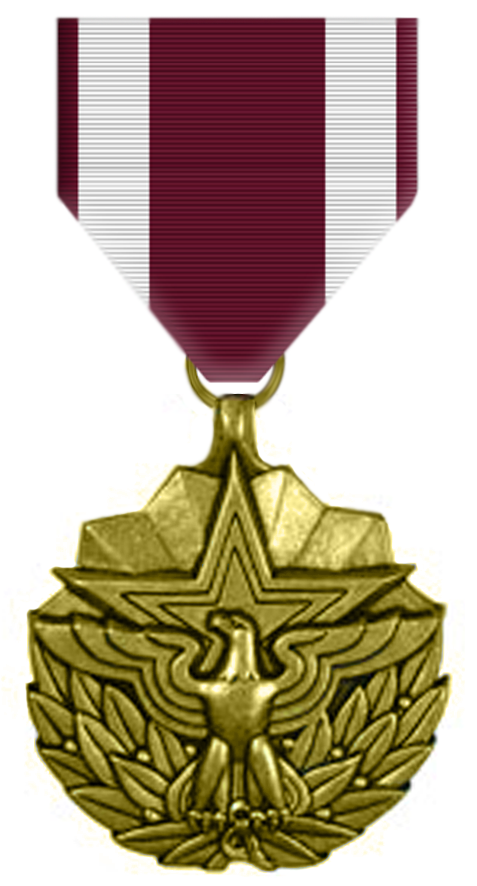

For outstanding meritorious service while serving as Commanding Officer of Patrol Squadron 94, Naval Air Station New Orleans, Louisiana from March 1989 through October 1990. Commander Mastangi’s innovative leadership and innate abilities were the driving force behind his squadron attaining the highest possible level of mobilization readiness. He oversaw the establishment of superlative safety programs and the flawless execution of two Annual Training periods and two major Drug Interdiction detachments. During this tenure, Commander Mastagni left his personal mark of excellence on every facet of squadron life, resulting in his squadron being the Commander Reserve Patrol Wing Atlantic (COMRESPATWINGLANT) nominee for the Commander Naval Air Reserve Force Noel Davis "Battle E" Award for 1989 as well as the winner of the 1989 COMRESPATWINGLANT Retention Excellence Award. By his tireless efforts, inspiring leadership, and loyal dedication to duty, Commander Mastagni reflected great credit upon himself and upheld the highest traditions of the United States Naval Service.

(Gold Star in lieu of Second Award)

For outstanding meritorious service as Commanding Officer of Naval Reserve Patrol Wing Atlantic 0186 at Naval Air Reserve Norfolk from October 1993 through October 1996. Displaying superb leadership, Captain Mastagni provided qualified command personnel who contributed to the successful planning and execution of the Commander Reserve Patrol Wing Aerial Minded Exercise Resolute Response and Counter Narcotic Patrol Operations. He directly supported the planning and execution of Operation Uphold Democracy, the blockade of Haiti, and Operation Sharp Guard, the aerial blockade of Bosnia. Assuming the duties of the Control Group Commander for Joint Exercise Northern Viking, Captain Mastagni oversaw the research, planning, and training required for this exercise and supplied quality personnel needed to make an operation if the defense of Ireland were ever required. Additionally, the unit consistently maintained a trained effectiveness rate above 90 percent. The unit readiness and retention level was also at 100 percent. Captain Mastagni’s professional ability, superb leadership, and devotion to duty reflected great credit upon himself and were in keeping with the highest traditions of the United States Naval Service.

(Gold Star in lieu of Third Award)

For outstanding meritorious service as Commanding Officer, Naval Reserve, Commander Naval Air Force, United States Atlantic Fleet NR COMNAVAIRLANT 1086 from October 1996 to September 1997. Captain Mastagni consistently performed his demanding duties in an exemplary and highly professional manner. An extraordinary and resourceful leader, Captain Mastagni led NR COMNAVAIRLANT 1086 to unprecedented levels of readiness and fleet support. Under his strong guidance, the unit attained an impressive R1 readiness status despite an 18 percent decrease in personnel assets. While serving during a period of decreasing personnel manning and severe manpower constraints, Captain Mastagni’s leadership enabled NR COMNAVAIRLANT 1086 to provide the Atlantic Fleet with continuous 24-hour-a-day staff support and provided countless man days of support from officers and enlisted personnel. Committed and dedicated to the concept of total force structure, Captain Mastagni significantly enhanced the ability of COMNAVAIRLANT 1086 by personally transforming the unit from an exclusive COMNAVAIRLANT support unit into a joint force team capable of serving all Joint Forces throughout the world. His unit provided unprecedented Navy Reserve centralization to seven defense exercises, including Indifferent Strike, Deny Flight, Solid Citizen, Solid Shield and many others. By his exceptional professional ability, personal initiative, and total dedication to duty, Captain Mastagni reflected great credit upon himself and upheld the highest traditions of the United States Naval Reserve.

(Gold Star in lieu of Fourth Award)

For outstanding meritorious service as Executive Officer, Exercise Action Officer, and Exercise Site Officer-in-Charge, Naval Reserve Commander Seventh Fleet Detachment One-One-One from October 1997 to September 2000. Captain Mastagni directed the efforts of more than 350 officers and enlisted personnel who provided more than 14,000 days of contributory support. His personal participation in six major training exercises, serving in the most demanding and responsible positions, received recognition at the highest levels of the Pacific Fleet. Due to Captain Mastagni’s strong and dynamic leadership his unit’s outstanding reputation in Seventh Fleet Operations has been reinforced and enhanced. His direction of the largest Annual Training and Additional Duty for Training Budget of any Reserve Augment Unit resulted in unprecedented levels of exercise participation. Captain Mastagni’s sterling service on selection, promotion, and policy boards continues to shape the future of the Naval Reserve. Captain Mastagni’s exceptional professionalism, personal initiative, and total dedication to duty reflected great credit upon him and were in keeping with the highest traditions of the United States Naval Service.

NAVY COMMENDATION MEDAL

For meritorious service while serving as Commanding Officer of Naval Reserve Naval Station (NR NAVSTA), Rota, Naval Air Station, New Orleans, Louisiana from 1 August 1991 to 31 July 1993. Through extraordinary leadership, professional knowledge and managerial skills, Commander Mastagni increased unit readiness from R-3 to R-1 and molded the personnel into an extremely capable mobilization ready force. His personal efforts were directly responsible for the command increasing personnel 100 percent qualified in-billet rate from 14.4 to a record high of 73.9 percent, advancement eligibility by 51 percent and overall readiness from 70 to 94 percent, the highest in unit history. Based on his individual adroitness and the unit’s sustained superior performance, NR NAVSTA Rota received the Naval Air Station, New Orleans nomination for the Captain Robert I. Barte Award for the most outstanding augment unit in Commander, Naval Air Reserve Force. Commander Mastagni’s exceptional professional ability, initiative and loyal dedication to duty reflected credit upon himself and were in keeping with the highest traditions of the United States Naval Service.

UNIT AWARDS

- Coast Guard Meritorious Unit Commendation with Operational Distinghuising Device: Service between January 9 and January 11, 1987

- Navy "E" Ribbon: For award of the Noel Davis Award for period January 1 to December 31, 1987

- Coast Guard Special Operations Service Ribbon: For duties rendered from March 19 to April 4, 1989

=== Assignment history ===
The active duty assignment history of Admiral Mastagni is as follows:

Date	Assignment	Position	Rank
1972	USS Dale (CG-19)	Various Duties	Ensign
1973	Training Air Wing Four	Flight Student	---
1974	Patrol Squadron 22	Pilot	Lieutenant (junior grade)
1977	United States Air Force Academy	Navy Liaison Officer	Lieutenant

Reserve assignments include:

Date	Assignment	Position	Rank	Reserve center
1979	Patrol Squadron 94	Maintenance & Operations Officer	Lieutenant	Naval Air Station, New Orleans, Louisiana
1982	---	Executive officer	Lieutenant commander	---
1987	---	Commanding Officer	Commander	---
1989	Naval Reserve Det 0182, Naval Air Station, Rota, Spain	Training officer	---	---
1991	---	Commanding officer	---	---
1993	Naval Reserve Patrol Wing Atlantic, Det 0186	Commanding officer	Captain	Naval Reserve Center, Norfolk, Virginia
1995	Naval Reserve, Naval Air Forces Atlantic, Det 1086	---	---	---
1997	Naval Reserve Det 111, Seventh Fleet	Special Assistant	---	Carswell Air Force Base
1999	---	Executive Officer	---	---
2000	Volunteer Training Unit 8282	Various duties	---	New Orleans Naval Reserve Center

Flag assignments include:

Date	Assignment	Position	Rank
2002	Naval Forces Korea	Commander Shore Forces, Reserve Forces; Rear Area 7th Fleet	Rear admiral (lower half)
2003	Naval Forces Korea	Commanding admiral	---
---	Fleet Air Force Mediterranean	Deputy commander	---
2004	Naval Forces Europe	Vice commander	---

Mastagni transferred to the Retired Naval Reserve in September 2005.
