= Michael E. Boyle =

U.S. Navy admiral (born 1965)

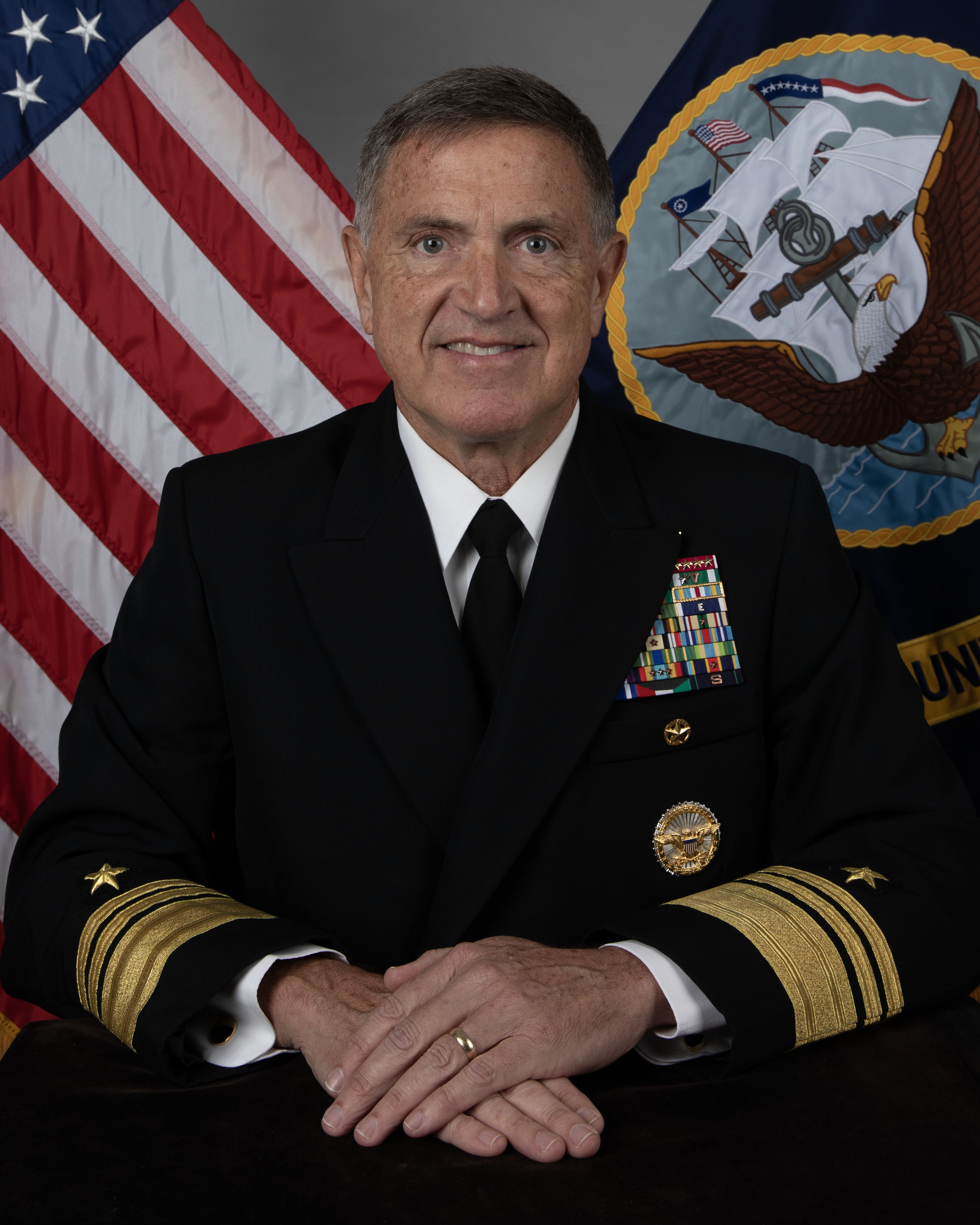
- Official portrait, 2024
- Born: 1965 (age 60–61)
- Military career
- Allegiance: United States
- Branch: United States Navy
- Service years: 1987–present
- Rank: Vice Admiral
- Commands: United States Third Fleet; Carrier Strike Group 12; United States Naval Forces Korea; Carrier Air Wing Five; Carrier Air Wing Eleven; VFA-81

Michael Edward Boyle (born 1965) is a United States Navy vice admiral who has served as the director of the Navy Staff since 2 August 2024. He most recently served as commander of the United States Third Fleet from 2022 to 2024. He served as the Director of Maritime Operations of the United States Pacific Fleet from 2020 to 2022, and previously commanded Carrier Strike Group 12 from 2019 to 2020.

Raised in McLean, Virginia, Boyle is a 1987 graduate of Jacksonville University with a B.S. degree in business management. He is the son of a naval aviator and became one himself in January 1990 after completing flight school. Boyle later earned a master's degree in foreign affairs from the Air Command and Staff College.

In April 2024, Boyle was nominated for assignment as deputy chief of naval operations for operations, plans, and strategy. In July 2024, he was nominated for director of the Navy Staff instead.

Military offices
Preceded by Charles Cooper II	Commander of the United States Naval Forces Korea and Navy Region Korea; 2018–2019	Succeeded by Michael P. Donnelly
Preceded by John F.G. Wade	Commander of Carrier Strike Group 12; 2019–2020	Succeeded by Craig Clapperton
Preceded by Marc H. Dalton	Director of Maritime Operations of the United States Pacific Fleet; 2020–2022	Succeeded by Daniel P. Martin
Preceded by Stephen T. Koehler	Commander of the United States Third Fleet; 2022–2024	Succeeded by John F.G. Wade
Preceded by Andrew S. Haeuptle	Director of the Navy Staff; 2024–present	Incumbent
