= George P. Steele =

American admiral (1924–2018)

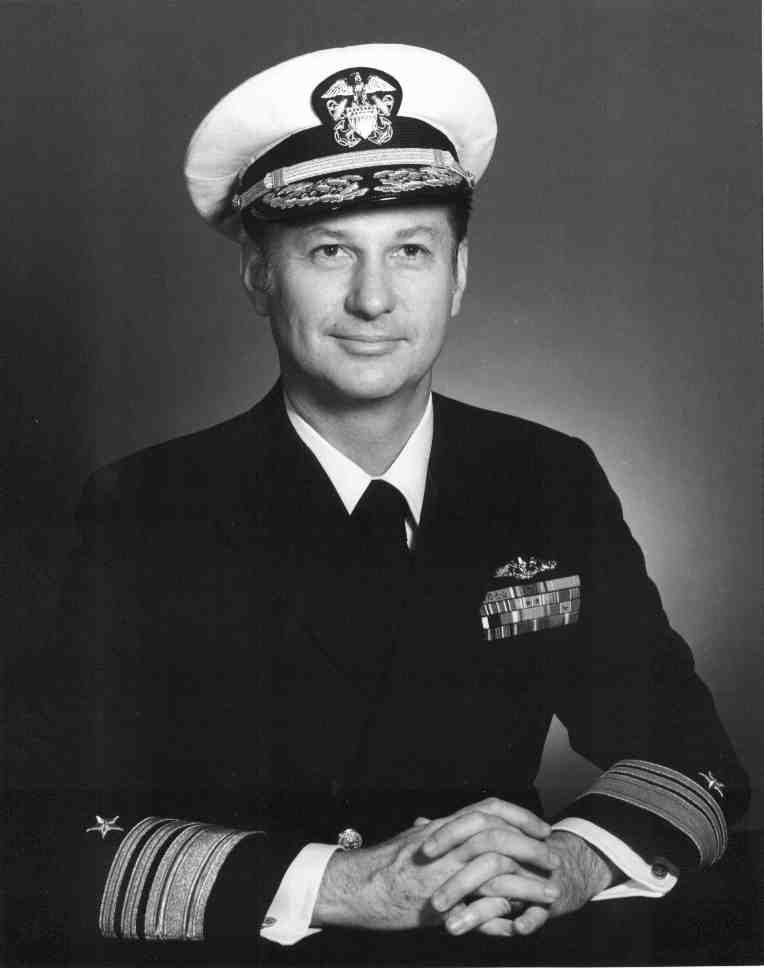
- Born: July 27, 1924; San Francisco, California, U.S.
- Died: February 13, 2018 (aged 93)
- Burial place: United States Naval Academy Cemetery
- Relatives: Son of James M. Steele, Captain, USN (Ret) Commanding Officer USS Utah, December 7, 1941
- Military career
- Allegiance: United States
- Branch: United States Navy
- Service years: 1944–1975
- Rank: Vice admiral
- Commands: United States Seventh Fleet
- Conflicts: Operation Frequent Wind

George Peabody Steele II (July 27, 1924 – February 13, 2018) was a vice admiral in the United States Navy. He is a former commander of the United States Seventh Fleet (July 28, 1973 – June 15, 1975) and Commander Naval Forces Korea. He was a 1944 graduate of the United States Naval Academy.
