= Commander Fleet Activities Chinhae =

United States Navy installation

- 진해 함대지원부대
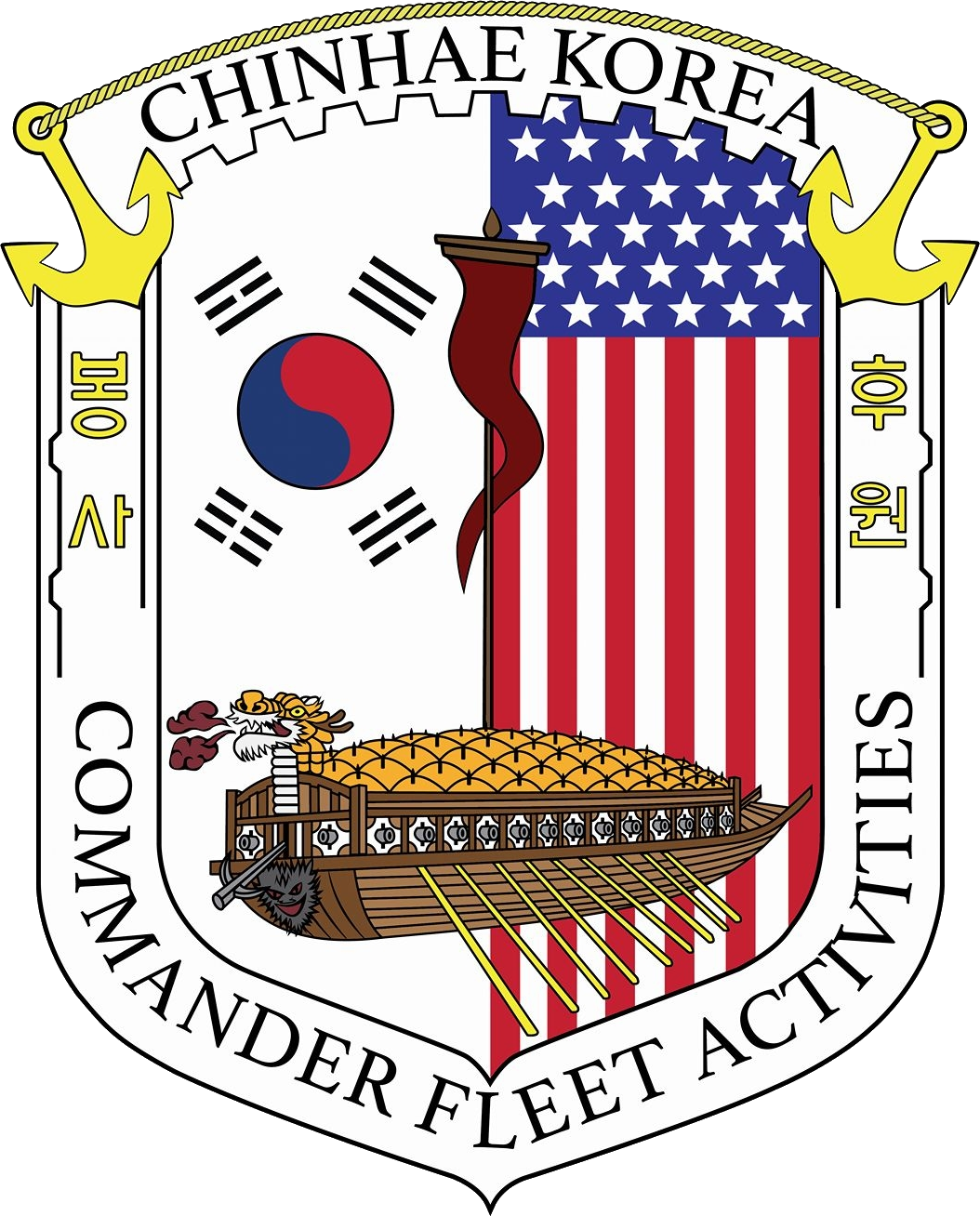
- Founded: 1946
- Country: United States
- Branch: United States Navy
- Role: Fleet support
- Part of: Commander Naval Forces Korea
- Garrison/HQ: Jinhae Naval Base, Changwon, South Gyeongsang Province
- Nickname: CFAC
- Mottos: "Serving, Sponsoring"
- Website: https://cnrk.cnic.navy.mil/

Commanders
- Current commander: CDR Lawrence E. Schaffer

Commander Fleet Activities Chinhae (Korean: 진해 함대지원부대; Hanja: 鎭海艦隊支援部隊), also known as CFAC, is a United States Navy's unit in the Jinhae district of Changwon, South Korea. It is located near Busan and is the one of two U.S. Naval Installations on mainland Asia.

== History ==
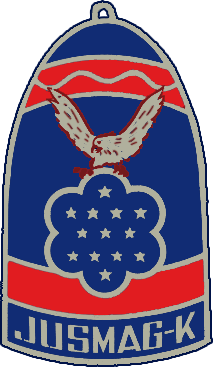
JUSMAG-K Insignia

Originally a U.S. Naval Advisory Group in 1946, CFAC eventually evolved into the first Fleet Detachment, Naval Station, JUSMAG-K and then reorganized as the Chinhae Facility in 1972. Since the 1972 reorganization and renaming to "Field Logistics Center, Chinhae." Subsequent reorganizations resulted in the current Commander, Fleet Activities, Chinhae with Commander, U.S. Naval Forces, Detachment Chinhae as a tenant activity.

== See also ==
- Busan Naval Base
- Republic of Korea Navy
