= United States Naval Forces Korea =

Major shore command of the United States Navy in South Korea

Commander, U.S. Naval Forces Korea Commander, Navy Region Korea
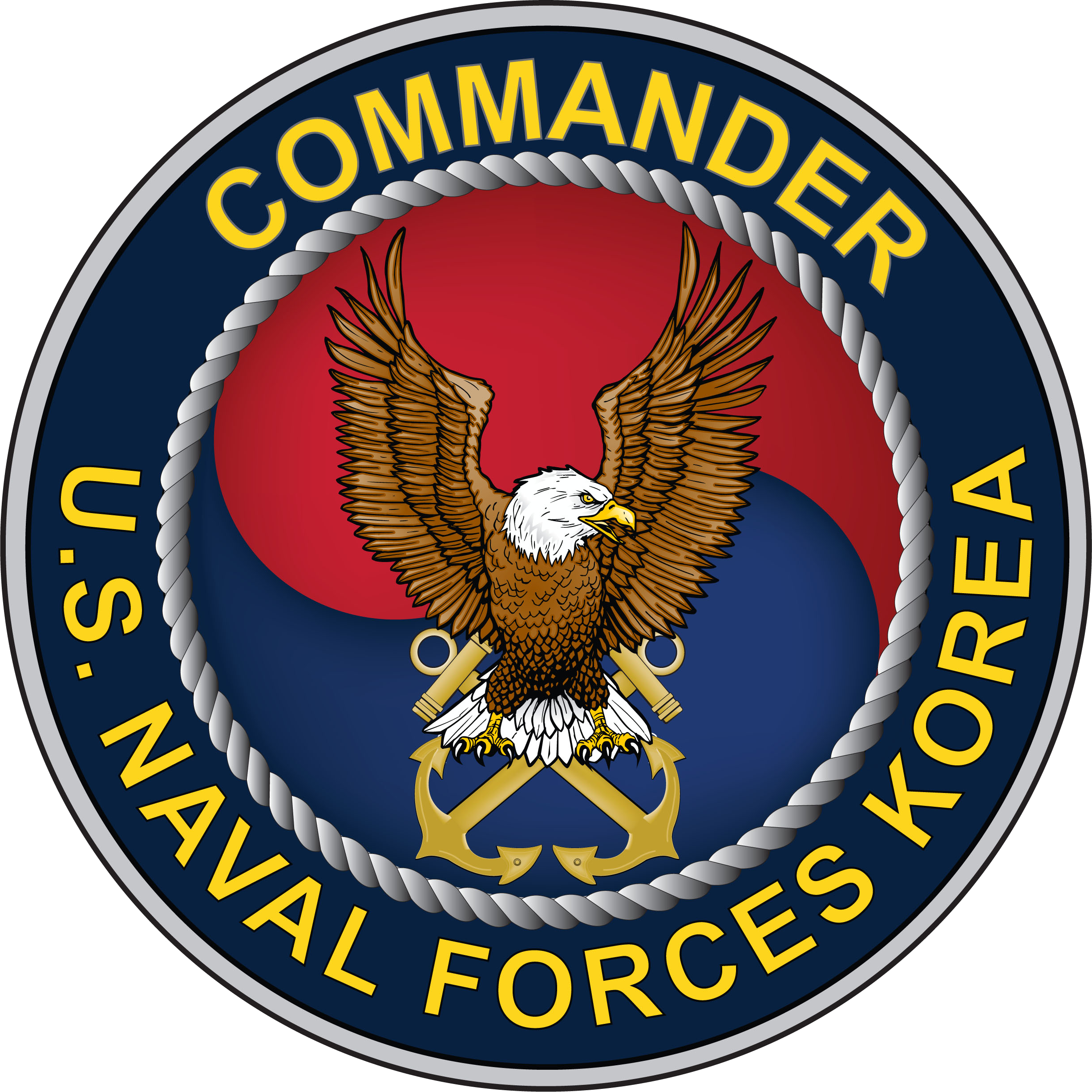
- The current seal of the Commander of United States Naval Forces Korea, adopted in 2010.
- Founded: July 1, 1957; 69 years ago
- Country: United States
- Branch: United States Navy
- Type: Regional command / shore staff
- Part of: U.S. Pacific Fleet; United Nations Command; Navy Installations Command
- Nickname: CNFK
- Website: cnrk.cnic.navy.mil

Commanders
- Current commander: RDML Sharif H. Calfee

Insignia
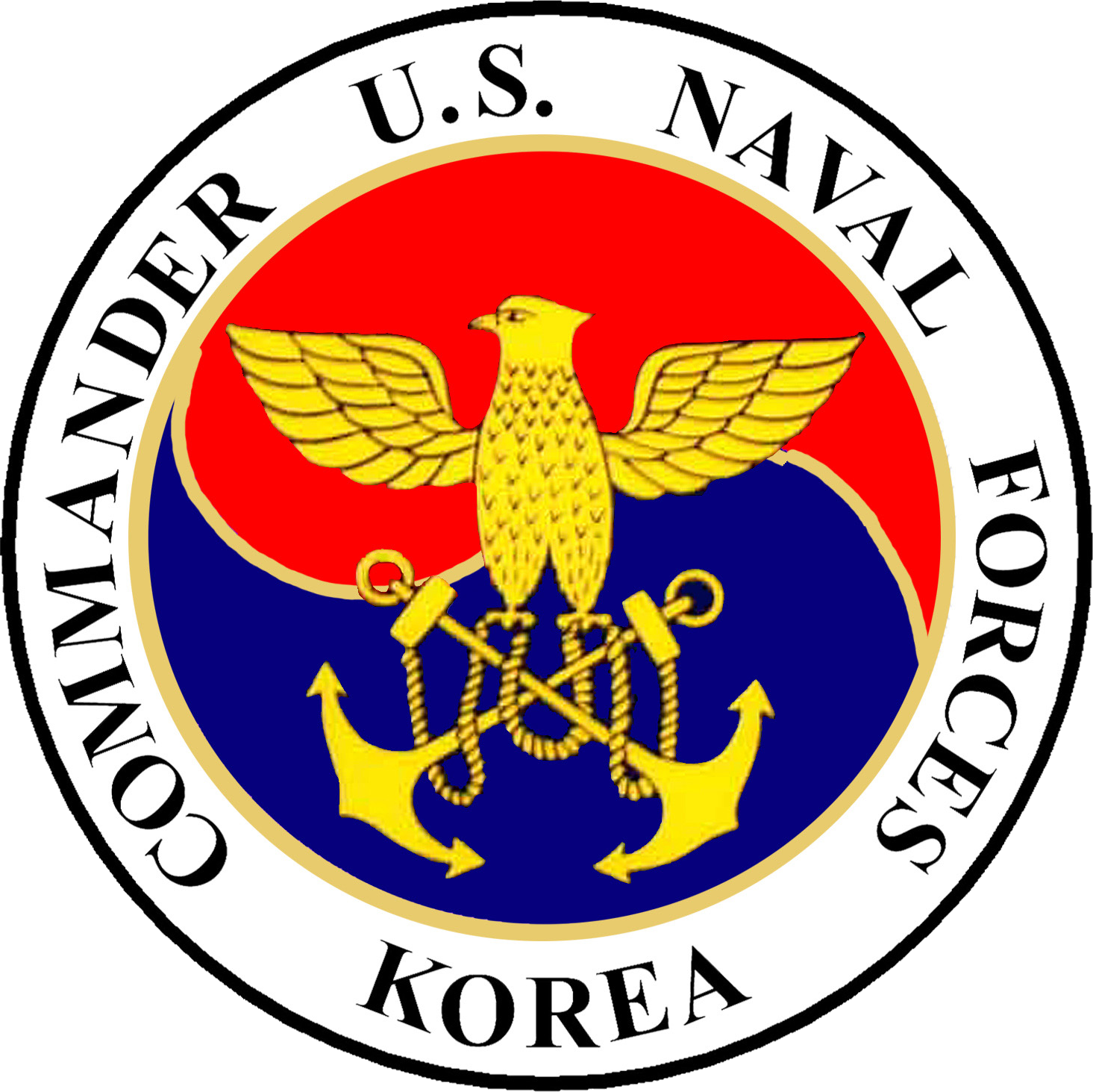
- Former seal (used until 2010)

The U.S. Naval Forces Korea is a major shore command of the United States Navy that serves as the shore support agency for all U.S. naval activity in South Korea. Known by the initials "CNFK", an abbreviation of the address format of the unit ("Commander, U.S. Naval Forces Korea"), its headquarters are at Busan Naval Base, Busan.

CNFK is jointly under the command of the operational command of United States Pacific Fleet, responsible for the support of all U.S. naval forces on the Korean Peninsula, and United States Forces Korea. CNFK is also CNIC's assigned Region Commander with administrative control over what are two naval installations in South Korea which are United States Fleet Activities Chinhae and United States Fleet Activities Busan. CNFK is commanded by a rear admiral (lower half) who serves as the Navy liaison to the Commander of the United States Forces Korea. In times of war, CNFK becomes a ground-based task force of United States Seventh Fleet.

== History ==
U.S. Naval Forces, Korea, was established on 1 July 1957, with headquarters in Seoul. The command was created by the reorganization of the Naval Forces, Far East Command into the separate commands of Naval Forces Japan and Naval Forces Korea. Commander, Naval Forces Korea, assumed the following additional duties:

- Commander, Naval Component Command, United Nations Command
- Chief, U.S. Naval Advisory Group, Korea, and Navy Advisor to the Republic of Korea
- Commander, Naval Component Command, U.S. Forces Korea
- On-Call Member, United Nations Military Armistice Commission

The principal mission of CNFK was acting as part of the United Nations Command. In this regard, the commander exercised command of U.S. Naval Forces assigned or attached, and operational control over the Republic of Korea Navy.

Rear Admiral Neil A. Koprowski assumed command of CNFK in June 2023.

== Bases ==
- United States Fleet Activities Busan
- United States Fleet Activities Chinhae

== List of commanders ==
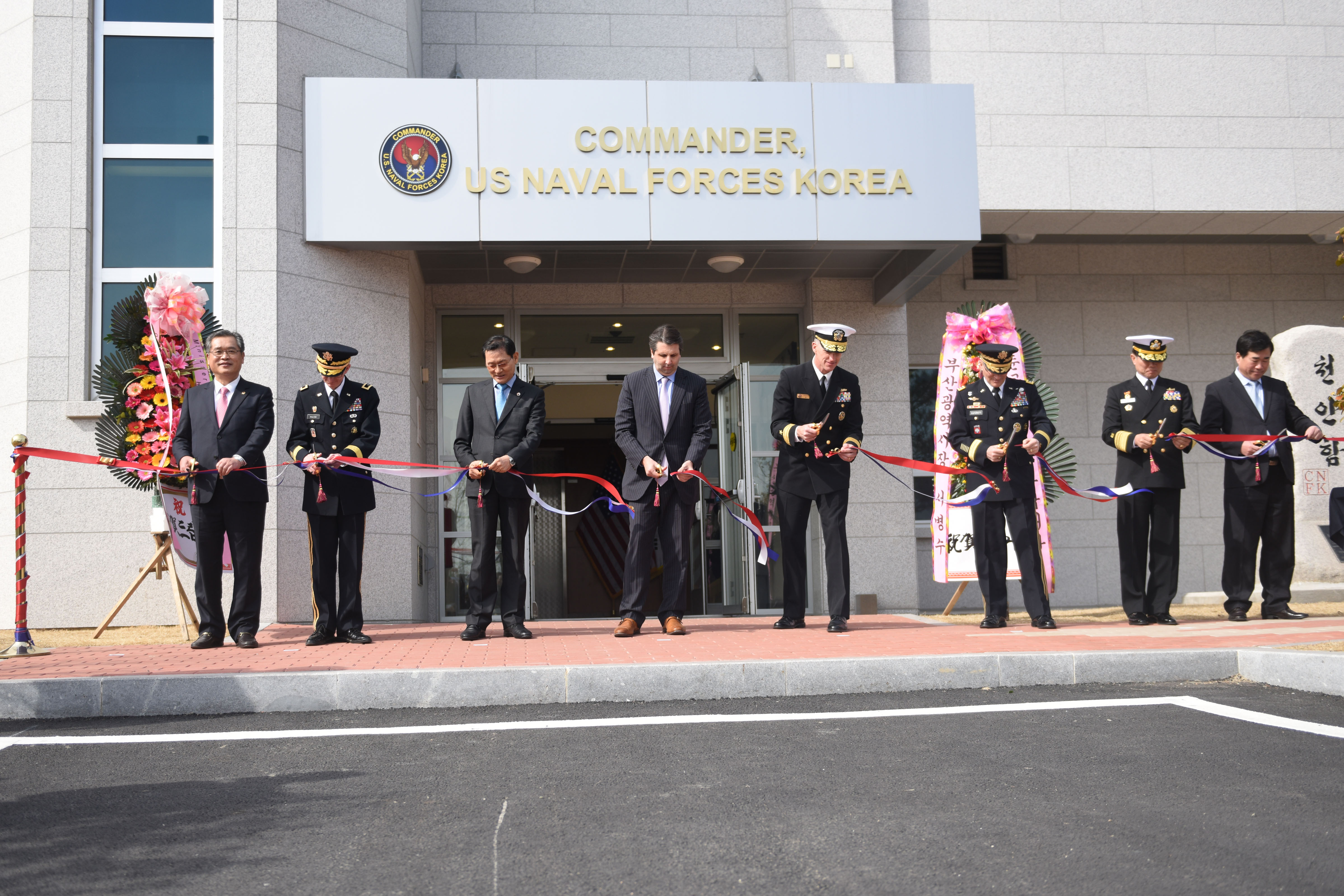
CNFK's HQ in Busan.

Commander	Term
Rear Adm. Albert E. Jarrell	(July 1957 – June 1958)
Rear Adm. Eugene B. McKinney	(June 1958 – June 1959)
Capt. Thomas W. Hogan	(June 1959 – September 1959)
Rear Adm. John A. Tyree Jr.	(September 1959 – August 1960)
Rear Adm. George W. Pressey	(August 1960 – September 1962)
Rear Adm. John M. Alford	(September 1962 – March 1964)
Rear Adm. Joseph W. Williams Jr.	(March 1964 – July 1964)
Rear Adm. Woodrow W. McCrory	(July 1964 – October 1966)
Rear Adm. Donal G. Irvine	(October 1966 – July 1968)
Rear Adm. George P. Steele	(July 1968 – September 1970)
Rear Adm. Victor A. Dybdal	(September 1970 – June 1972)
Rear Adm. Henry S. Morgan Jr.	(June 1972 – April 1975)
Rear Adm. Mark P. Frudden	(April 1975 – May 1977)
Rear Adm. Warren C. Hamm	(May 1977 – July 1979)
Rear Adm. Stephen J. Hostettler	(July 1979 – July 1981)
Rear Adm. James G. Storms	(July 1981 – July 1983)
Rear Adm. Warren F. Kelley	(July 1983 – April 1984)
Rear Adm. Charles F. Horne III	(April 1984 – October 1986)
Rear Adm. William T. Pendley	(October 1986 – February 1989)
Rear Adm. Larry G. Vogt	(February 1989 – January 1991)
Rear Adm. William W. Mathis	(January 1991 – August 1993)
Rear Adm. Edison L. Watkins III	(August 1993 – July 1995)
Rear Adm. Richard "Dick" Mayo	(July 1995 – December 1997)
Rear Adm. Christopher W. Cole	(December 1997 – October 1999)
Rear Adm. William D. Sullivan	(October 1999 – September 2001)
Rear Adm. Gary R. Jones	(September 2001 – August 2003)
Rear Adm. Daniel S. Mastagni	(July 2003 – September 2003)
Rear Adm. Fred Byus	(September 2003 – September 2005)
Rear Adm. James P. Wisecup	(September 2005 – September 2007)
Rear Adm. Thomas S. Rowden	(September 2007 – September 2009)
Rear Adm. Peter A. Gumataotao	(September 2009 – September 2011)
Rear Adm. William C. McQuilkin	(September 2011 – September 2013)
Rear Adm. Lisa Franchetti	(September 2013 – August 2015)
Rear Adm. William D. Byrne Jr.	(August 2015 – September 2016)
Rear Adm. Charles B. Cooper II	(August 2016 – January 2018)
Rear Adm. Michael E. Boyle	(January 2018 – March 2019)
Rear Adm. Michael P. Donnelly	(April 2019 - September 2021)
Rear Adm. Mark A. Schafer	(September 2021 - June 2023)
Rear Adm. Neil A. Koprowski	(June 2023 - July 2025)
Rear Adm. Sharif H. Calfee	(July 2025 - present)
