= Patrick Hannifin =

Patrick Hannifin may refer to:

- Patrick J. Hannifin (submariner) (1923–2014), U.S. Navy admiral, director of the Joint Staff
- Patrick J. Hannifin (naval aviator) (born c.1969), U.S. Navy admiral, Seventh Fleet commander
