= Hannifin =

Hannifin is a surname. Notable people with the surname include:

- Daniel L. Hannifin (1863–?), American politician
- Jack Hannifin (1883–1945), American baseball player
- Patrick J. Hannifin (submariner) (1923–2014), United States Navy vice admiral
- Patrick J. Hannifin (naval aviator) (born c.1967), United States Navy vice admiral
