= United States Seventh Fleet =

Numbered fleet of the United States Navy

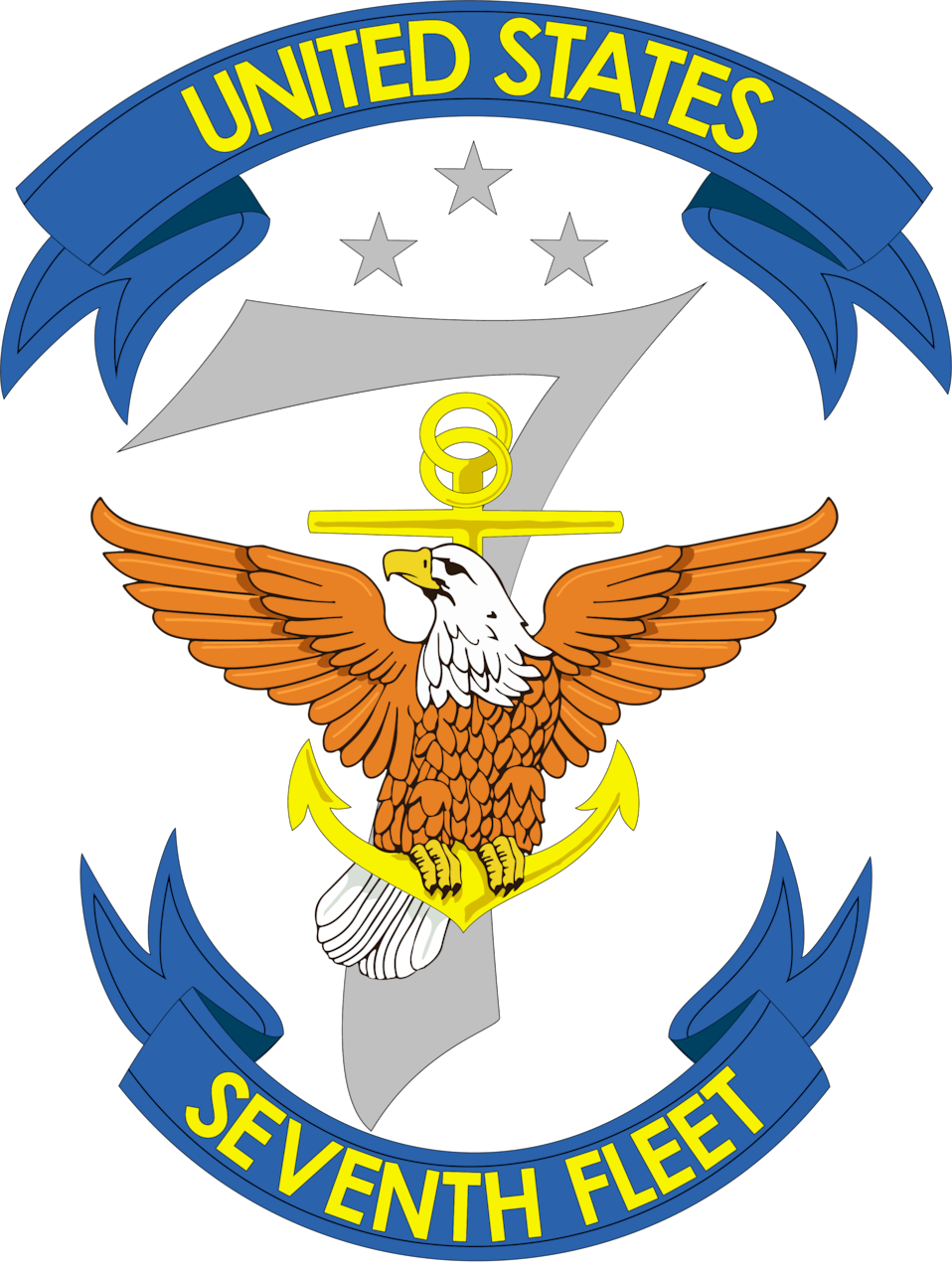
- Seventh Fleet's insignia
- Founded: 15 March 1943; 83 years ago
- Country: United States
- Branch: United States Navy
- Type: Fleet
- Part of: U.S. Pacific Fleet
- Garrison/HQ: U.S. Fleet Activities Yokosuka
- Nickname: 'Tonkin Gulf Yacht Club' (Vietnam War)
- Engagements: World War II; Korean War; Second Taiwan Strait Crisis; Vietnam War; Operation Formation Star; Indo-Pakistani War of 1971; Gulf War; 1994 North Korean nuclear crisis; Third Taiwan Strait Crisis; 1999 East Timorese crisis; Global War on Terrorism
- Website: https://www.c7f.navy.mil/

Commanders
- Commander: VADM Patrick J. Hannifin
- Vice Commander: RDML Katie F. Sheldon, USN
- Deputy Commander: RDML Kyle Gantt, USN
- Command Master Chief: CMDCM Jeremy E. Douglas, USN

The Seventh Fleet is a numbered fleet of the United States Navy. It is headquartered at U.S. Fleet Activities Yokosuka, in Yokosuka, Kanagawa Prefecture, Japan. It is part of the United States Pacific Fleet. At present, it is the largest of the forward-deployed U.S. fleets, with 50 to 70 ships, 150 aircraft and 27,000 sailors and marines. Its principal responsibilities are to provide joint command in natural disaster or military operations and operational command of all U.S. naval forces in the region.

== History ==
=== World War II ===
The Seventh Fleet was formed on 15 March 1943 in Brisbane, Australia, during World War II, under the command of Admiral Arthur S. "Chips" Carpender. It served in the South West Pacific Area (SWPA) under General Douglas MacArthur. The Seventh Fleet commander also served as commander of Allied naval forces in the SWPA.

Most of the ships of the Royal Australian Navy were also part of the fleet from 1943 to 1945 as part of Task Force 74 (formerly the Anzac Squadron). The Seventh Fleet—under Admiral Thomas C. Kinkaid—formed a large part of the Allied forces at the Battle of Leyte Gulf, the largest naval battle in history, in October 1944. The Seventh Fleet fought in two of the Battle of Leyte Gulf's main actions, the Battle of Surigao Strait and the Battle off Samar.

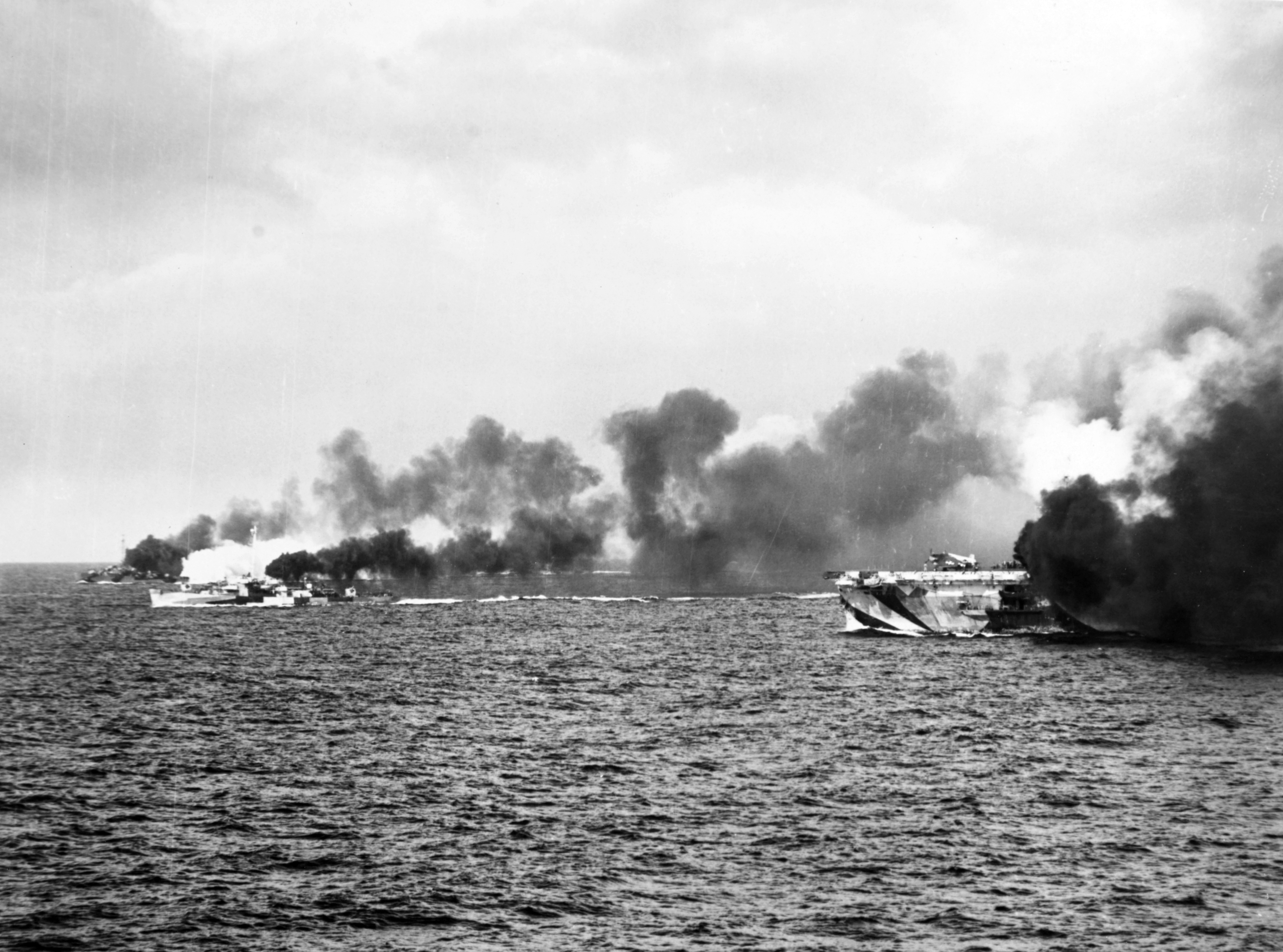
USS Gambier Bay (CVE-73) and escorts at the Battle off Samar in October 1944.

=== 1945–1950 ===
After the end of the war, the 7th Fleet moved its headquarters to Qingdao, China. As laid out in Operation Plan 13–45 of 26 August 1945, Kinkaid established five major task forces to manage operations in the Western Pacific: Task Force 71, the North China Force with 75 ships; Task Force 72, the Fast Carrier Force, directed to provide air cover to the Marines going ashore and discourage with dramatic aerial flyovers any Communist forces that might oppose the operation; Task Force 73, the Yangtze Patrol Force with another 75 combatants; Task Force 74, the South China Force, ordered to protect the transportation of Japanese and Chinese Nationalist troops from that region; and Task Force 78, the Amphibious Force, charged with the movement of the III Marine Amphibious Corps to China.

After the war, on 1 January 1947, the Fleet's name was changed to Naval Forces Western Pacific. In late 1948, the Fleet moved its principal base of operations from Qingdao to the Philippines, where the Navy, following the war, had developed new facilities at Subic Bay and an airfield at Sangley Point. Peacetime operations of the Seventh Fleet were under the control of Commander in Chief Pacific Fleet, Admiral Arthur W. Radford, but standing orders provided that, when operating in Japanese waters or in the event of an emergency, control would pass to Commander, Naval Forces Far East, a component of General Douglas MacArthur's occupation force.

On 19 August 1949 the force was designated as United States Seventh Task Fleet. On 11 February 1950, just prior to the outbreak of the Korean War, the force assumed the name United States Seventh Fleet, which it holds today.

=== Korean War ===
Seventh Fleet units participated in all major operations of the Korean and Vietnamese Wars. The first Navy jet aircraft used in combat was launched from a Task Force 77 (TF 77) aircraft carrier on 3 July 1950. The landings at Inchon, Korea were conducted by Seventh Fleet amphibious ships. The battleships Iowa, New Jersey, Missouri and Wisconsin all served as flagships for Commander, U.S. Seventh Fleet during the Korean War. During the Korean War, the Seventh Fleet consisted of Task Force 70, a maritime patrol force provided by Fleet Air Wing One and Fleet Air Wing Six, Task Force 72, the Formosa Patrol, Task Force 77, and Task Force 79, a service support squadron.

Over the next decade the Seventh Fleet responded to numerous crisis situations including contingency operations conducted in Laos in 1959 and Thailand in 1962. During September 1959, in the autumn of 1960, and again in January 1961, the Seventh Fleet deployed multiship carrier task forces into the South China Sea. Although the Pathet Lao and North Vietnamese supporting forces withdrew in each crisis, in the spring of 1961 their offensive appeared on the verge of overwhelming the pro-American Royal Lao Army.

Once again the fleet moved into Southeast Asian waters. By the end of April 1961, most of the Seventh Fleet was deployed off the Indochinese Peninsula preparing to initiate operations into Laos. The force consisted of the Coral Sea and Midway carrier battle groups, antisubmarine support carrier Kearsarge, one helicopter carrier, three groups of amphibious ships, two submarines, and three Marine battalion landing teams. At the same time, shorebased air patrol squadrons and another three Marine battalion landing teams stood ready in Okinawa and the Philippines to support the afloat force. Although the administration of President John F. Kennedy already had decided against American intervention to rescue the Laotian government, Communist forces halted their advance and agreed to negotiations. The contending Laotian factions concluded a cease-fire on 8 May 1961, but it lasted only a year.

In June 1963 the Seventh Fleet held 'Flagpole '63,' a joint naval exercise with the Republic of Korea.

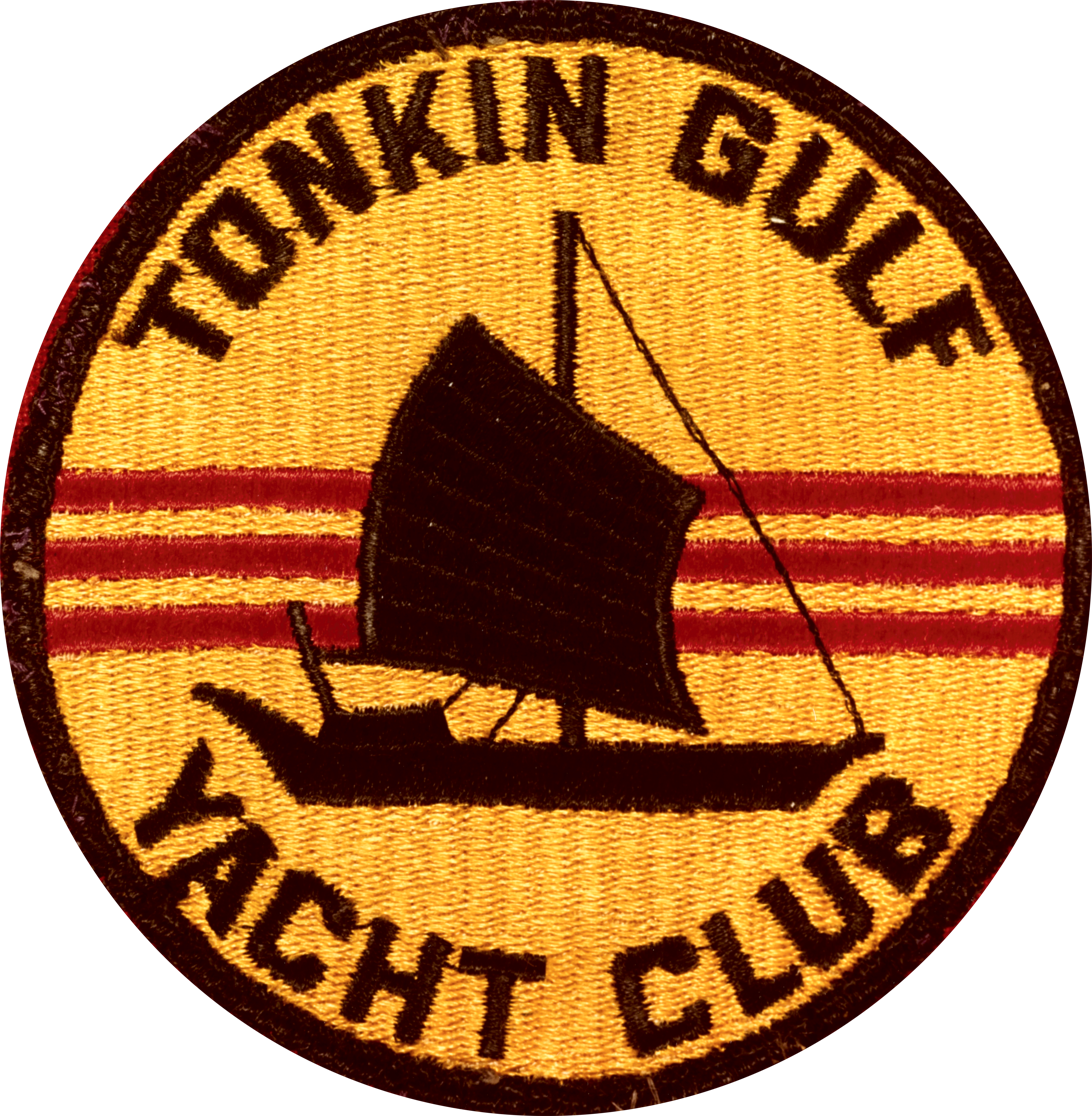
Military humor: Unofficial insignia of the "Tonkin Gulf Yacht Club" – aka U.S. 7th Fleet.

Seventh Fleet represented the first official entrance of the United States into the Vietnam War, with the Gulf of Tonkin incident. Between 1950 and 1970, the U.S. Seventh Fleet was known by the tongue-in-cheek nickname "Tonkin Gulf Yacht Club" since most of the fleet's operations were conducted from the Tonkin Gulf at the time.

On 12 February 1965, USS Salisbury Sound (AV-13) became the first U.S. Navy ship to conduct operations inside Vietnam coastal waters. Salisbury Sound set up a seadrome in Da Nang Bay and conducted seaplane patrols in support of Operation Flaming Dart, the bombing of North Vietnamese army camps.

Operating primarily from Yankee Station off the north coast of Vietnam and the aptly-named Dixie Station off the south coast of Vietnam in the South China Sea, Seventh Fleet was organized into a series of task forces, often known by the acronym CTF (Commander Task Force):

- Task Force 73 included the fleet's logistics support vessels operating as an underway replenishment group (URG) containing an oiler, an ammunition ship, and other supply tenders.
- Task Force 75, Surface Combatant Force, contained the fleet's surface combatants and naval gunfire support. These units formed the gun line to bombard enemy forces during Operation Sea Dragon, Operation Custom Tailor, and Operation Lion's Den. The Royal Australian Navy contributed a series of guided missile destroyers to the gun line, including Hobart, Perth, Brisbane, and Vendetta. The naval gun line concept was made possible with deep waters for larger vessels well away from both the shoals and enemy coastal artillery. Task Group 70.8, a cruiser-destroyer subset of the task force, began shelling Vietnam on 27 May 1965. The cruisers and destroyers mostly used 5-inch and 8-inch guns while USS New Jersey opened fire with her 16-inch guns.
- Task Force 76 was the Amphibious Force, Seventh Fleet. Marines went ashore at Da Nang in March 1965 and patrolled throughout the I Corps area of responsibility during operations Starlite, Dagger Thrust, Double Eagle, and Jackstay.
- Task Force 77 was the Carrier Battle Force, Seventh Fleet. It would participate in striking North Vietnamese targets, providing air support to US forces in South Vietnam, and mining Haiphong Harbor.
- Task Force 78 was the fleet's minesweeper support. After the 1973 cease-fire, it was responsible for Operation End Sweep, removing naval mines dropped in Haiphong harbor only months earlier.
- Task Forces 116 and 117 were brown-water riverine forces involved in the interdiction efforts Operation Market Time, Operation Game Warden, and Operation Sealords.

In 1975, ships and aircraft of the Fleet evacuated thousands of U.S. citizens and refugees from South Vietnam and Cambodia as those countries fell to opposing forces.

Since the end of the Vietnam War, the Seventh Fleet has participated in a joint/combined exercise called Team Spirit, conducted with the Republic of Korea armed forces. With capability to respond to any contingency, Fleet operations are credited with maintaining security during the Asian Games of 1986 and the Seoul Olympics of 1988. During 1989, Seventh Fleet units participated in a variety of exercises called PACEX, the largest peacetime exercises since World War II.

=== 1971 War ===
A carrier task force of the Seventh Fleet, Task Force 74 (TF 74), entered the Bay of Bengal at the height of the war in December 1971.

The U.S. government stated at the time that the goal of the task force was to help evacuate Pakistani forces from East Pakistan following a ceasefire.

The task force comprised the nuclear-powered aircraft carrier Enterprise; the amphibious assault carrier Tripoli; the destroyers Decatur, McKean, and Orleck; the guided-missile escorts Waddell, King, and Parsons; the nuclear-powered attack submarine Gurnard; and supply ship Wichita. On 15 December, a day before the surrender of Pakistan to the joint force of India and Bangladesh (then East Pakistan), the task force entered the Bay of Bengal, at a distance of some 1,760 km (950 nmi; 1,090 mi) from Dhaka. At the same time, the Royal Navy also had forces in the Arabian Sea.

The Soviet Union also dispatched the 10th Operative Battle Group of its Pacific Fleet under Admiral Vladimir Kruglyakov from Vladivostok to the area.

=== Gulf War and 1990s ===
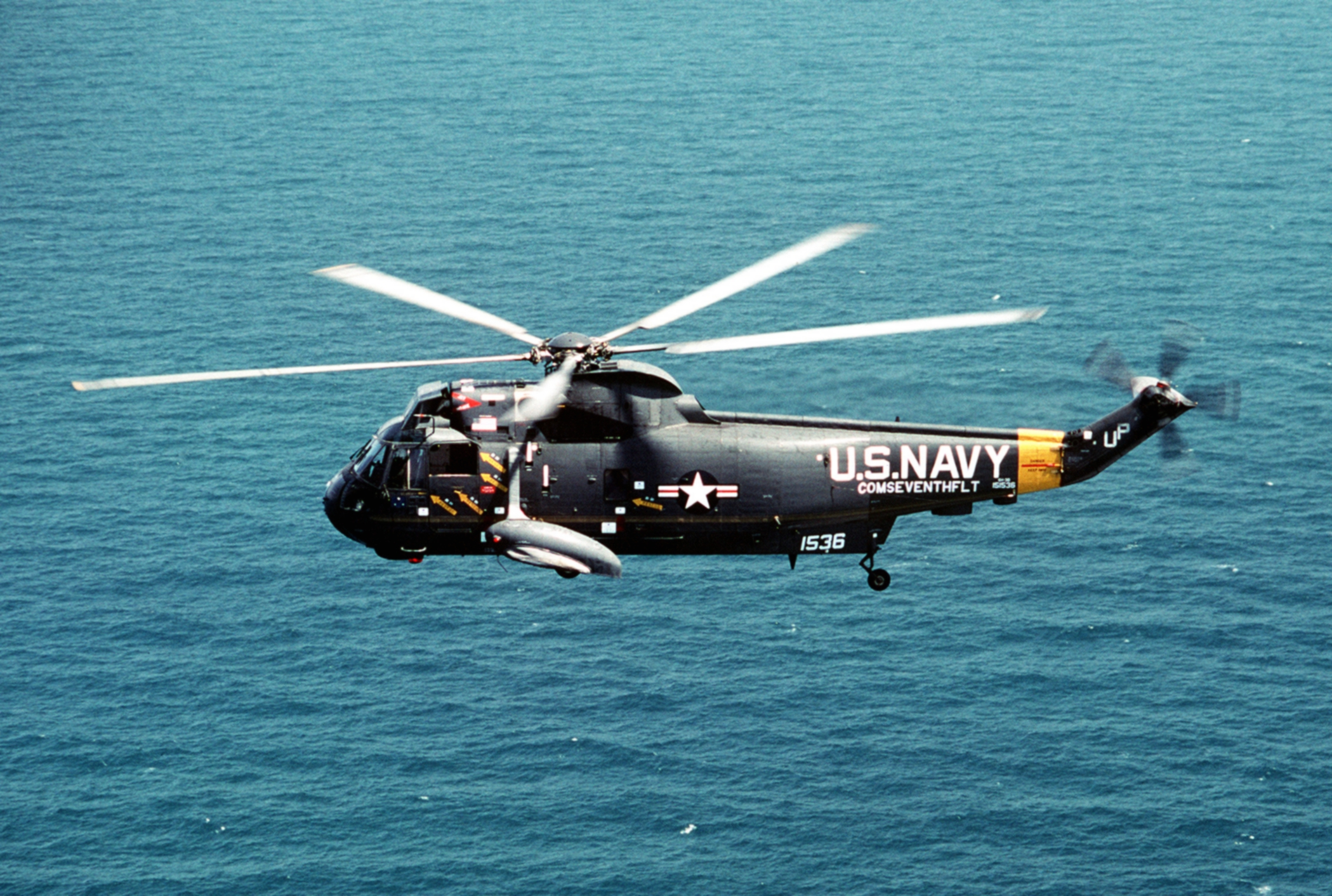
George Washington, Squadron HC-1 during operation "Desert Shield" in 1990, U.S. Seventh Fleet.

In response to the Iraqi invasion of Kuwait on 2 August 1990, General Norman Schwarzkopf (CINCCENT) discussed naval command arrangements in his area of responsibility with Commander-in-Chief, Pacific, Admiral Huntington Hardisty. The result was that Commander, U.S. Seventh Fleet was ordered to assume additional responsibilities as Commander, U.S. Naval Forces Central Command. The Fleet Commander departed Yokosuka, Japan immediately, heading for the Persian Gulf, and joined the remainder of his staff aboard the flagship Blue Ridge on 1 September 1990. During Operation Desert Shield and Operation Desert Storm, Naval Forces Central Command exercised command and control of the largest U.S. Navy armada since the Second World War. At the peak of combat operations, over 130 U.S. ships joined more than 50 allied ships to conduct maritime intercept operations, minesweeping and combat strike operations against enemy forces in Iraq and Kuwait.

Naval Forces Central Command included six aircraft carrier battle groups, two battleships (Missouri and Wisconsin), two hospital ships, 31 amphibious assault ships, four minesweeping vessels and numerous combatants in support of allied air and ground forces. After a decisive allied victory in the Gulf War, Commander U.S. Seventh Fleet relinquished control of Naval Forces Central Command to Commander, Middle East Force on 24 April 1991 and returned to Yokosuka, Japan to resume his Asia-Pacific duties.

Following months of tension as well as the death of North Korean leader Kim Il-Sung, in July 1994, the Kitty Hawk battle group was diverted from a Southern Watch deployment to the Persian Gulf and remained in the Western Pacific (the Seventh Fleet's operation area) for the entire deployment. The Independence also conducted operations near the Peninsula during the crisis.

In 1996, two aircraft carrier battle groups were sent to the Taiwan Straits under Seventh Fleet control to demonstrate U.S. support for Taiwan during the Third Taiwan Strait Crisis. The Nimitz battle group (CCDG 7) made a high-speed transit from the Persian Gulf, while Carrier Group Five, led by Independence, sortied from its Japanese homeports.

=== USS John S. McCain and Alnic MC collision ===
On 21 August 2017, while on a routine visit to Singapore, Arleigh Burke-class destroyer USS John S. McCain (DDG-56) was involved in a collision with merchant vessel Alnic MC off the coast of Singapore, east of the Strait of Malacca. The incident left 10 Navy sailors missing and five injured. The US Navy announced that Commander of the Seventh Fleet Vice Adm. Joseph Aucoin had been dismissed and replaced by Vice Adm. Phillip G. Sawyer, who had already been nominated and confirmed to replace the retiring Aucoin.

== Operations ==
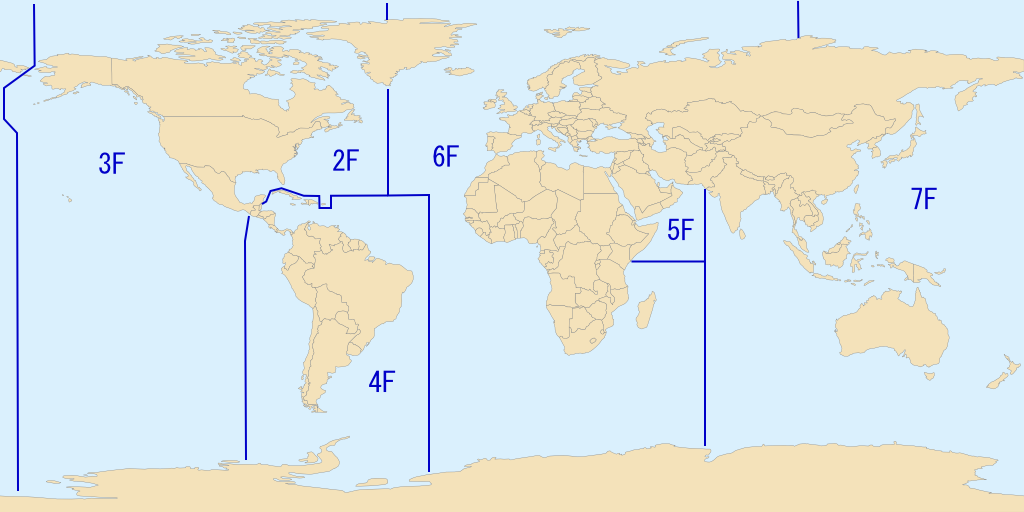
The Seventh Fleet's area of responsibility, 2009.

Of the 50–60 ships typically assigned to Seventh Fleet, 18 operate from U.S. facilities in Japan and Guam. These forward-deployed units represent the heart of Seventh Fleet, and the centerpieces of American forward presence in Asia. They are seventeen steaming days closer to locations in Asia than their counterparts based in the continental United States. It would take three to five times the number of rotationally-based ships in the U.S. to equal the same presence and crisis response capability as these 18 forward deployed ships. On any given day, about 50% of Seventh Fleet forces are deployed at sea throughout the area of responsibility.

Following the end of the Cold War, the two major military scenarios in which the Seventh Fleet would be used would be in case of conflict in Korea or a conflict between People's Republic of China and Taiwan (Republic of China) in the Taiwan Strait.

It was reported on 10 May 2012 that USS Freedom (LCS-1) would be dispatched to Singapore in the northern spring of 2013 for a roughly 10-month deployment. On 2 June 2012 the U.S. and Singaporean Defense Ministers announced that Singapore has agreed 'in principle' to the US request 'to forward deploy up to four littoral combat ships to Singapore on a rotational basis.' Officials stressed however that vessels will not be permanently based there and their crews will live aboard during ship visits.

== Fleet organization ==
The Seventh Fleet is organized into specialized task forces.

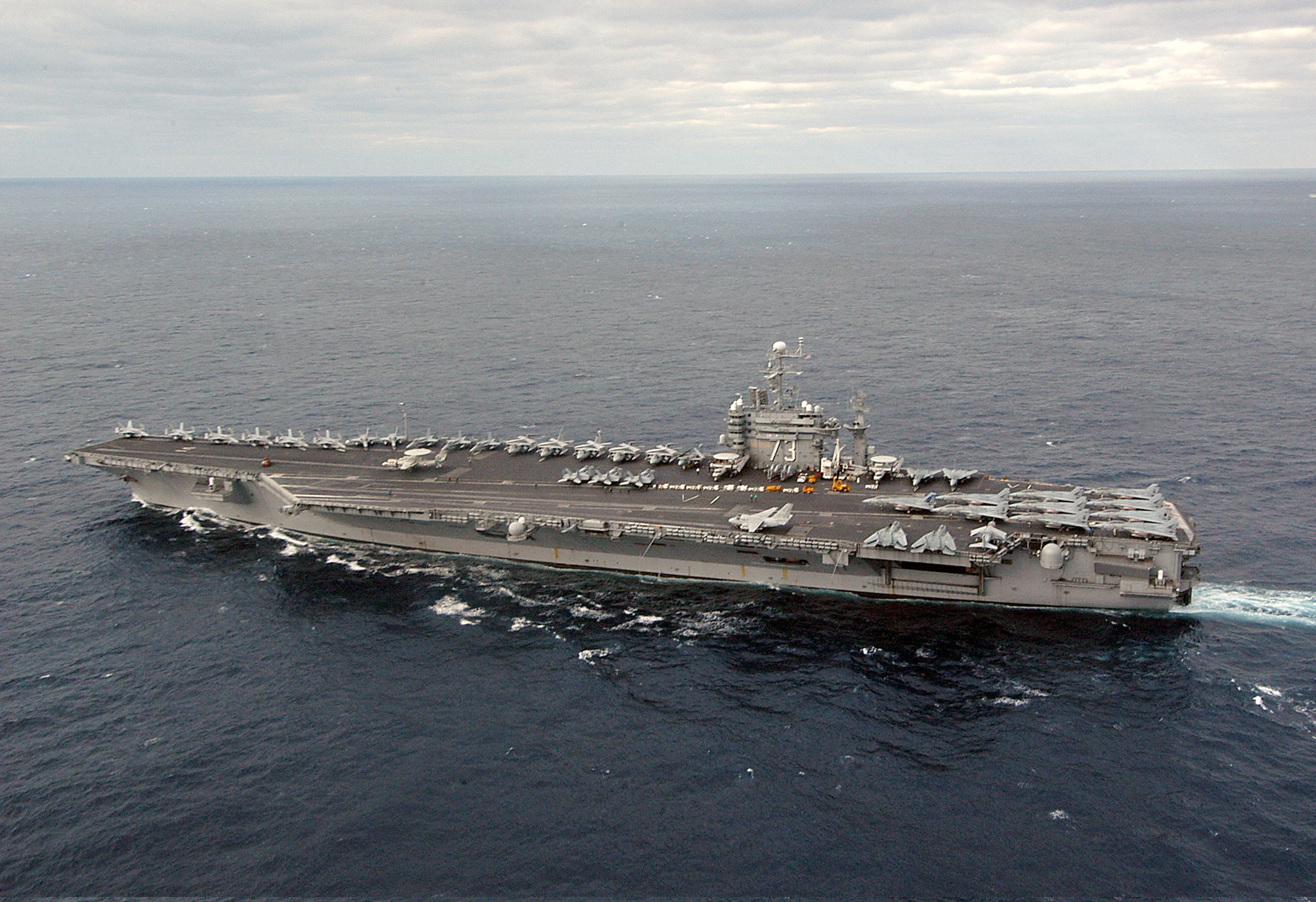
George Washington is the flagship of Task Force 70 of the U.S. Seventh Fleet.

Task Force 70 – TF 70 is the Battle Force of 7th Fleet and is made up of two distinct components: Surface Combatant Force 7th Fleet, composed of cruisers and destroyers, and Carrier Strike Force 7th Fleet, made up of at least one aircraft carrier and its embarked air wing. The Battle Force is currently centered around Carrier Strike Group Five, the carrier USS George Washington (CVN-73) responsible for unit-level training, integrated training, and material readiness for the group's ships and aviation squadrons. As the only continuously forward deployed carrier strike group, the CSG 5 staff does not stand down when the strike group is in Yokosuka, but instead continues to command deploying Carrier Strike Groups and independently deployed cruisers, destroyers, and frigates that operate in the Seventh Fleet operating area - Task Force 70 duties. The composition of the strike group in immediate proximity of George Washington varies throughout the year.

The CSG 5 Commander also serves as Battle Force Seventh Fleet and Commander, Task Force (CTF 70) for 7th Fleet. In these responsibilities, CSG 5 serves as the Commander of all surface forces (carrier strike groups, independently deploying cruisers, destroyers and frigates) in the 7th Fleet area of responsibility. CTF 70 also serves as the Theater Surface Warfare Commander (TSUWC) and Theater Integrated Air Missile Defense Commander (TIAMDC) for Seventh Fleet.

During the Korean War, Captain Charles L. Melson was the commanding officer of the flagship of the Seventh Fleet, the battleship USS New Jersey (BB-62) from 20 October 1952. He also served during that time as Commander, Task Group 70.1.

Task Force 71 – TF 71 includes all Naval Special Warfare (NSW) units and Explosive Ordnance Disposal Mobile Units (EODMU) assigned to 7th Fleet. It is based in Guam.

Task Force 72 – TF 72 is the Patrol and Reconnaissance Force, Seventh Fleet. It is located at Naval Air Facility Misawa (Misawa Air Base), Japan. It is mainly composed of anti-submarine warfare (ASW) aircraft and maritime airborne surveillance platforms such as P-3 Orion and Lockheed EP-3 reconnaissance planes operating on land bases. Toward the end of the Korean War, Commander Task Force 72 transferred his flag to USS Pine Island on 7 March and detachments of VP-42 also left USS Salisbury Sound for that seaplane tender. That same day Task Force Seventy-Two was established as the Formosa Patrol Force under Rear Admiral Williamson in Pine Island.

Task Force 73/Commander, Logistics Group Western Pacific – 7th Fleet's Logistics Force composed of supply ships and other fleet support vessels. Headquartered in Singapore.

Task Force 74 – TF 74 was the designation used for the Enterprise battle group in 1971. Today, it is the Fleet Submarine Force responsible for planning and coordinating submarine operations within 7th Fleet's area of operations.

Task Force 75 – Navy Expeditionary Forces Command Pacific is 7th Fleet's primary Expeditionary task force. Located in Camp Covington, Guam, CTF 75 is responsible for the planning and execution of coastal riverine operations, explosive ordnance disposal, diving, engineering and construction, and underwater construction throughout the 7th Fleet area of responsibility.

Task Force 76 – Amphibious assault task force currently headquartered at U.S. Fleet Activities Sasebo, mainly responsible for supporting Marine landing operations. It is composed of units capable of delivering ship-to-shore assault troops, such as America-class and Wasp-class amphibious assault ships, and landing craft.

Task Force 77 – 7th Fleet Mine Warfare Force composed of mine countermeasure, mine hunter, and mine control ships as well as mine countermeasure helicopters (MH-53). This task force is only activated during specific combat operations and was filled by the Commander of Mine Warfare Command. Mine Warfare Command has now been disestablished and replaced by Navy Mine and Antisubmarine Warfare Command, Naval Base Point Loma, Calif.

Task Force 78 – In 1973, Task Force 78 served as the mine clearance force that cleared Haiphong Harbour in Operation End Sweep. Major elements of the U.S. Navy mine warfare force, including Mobile Mine Command (MOMCOM), Mine Warfare Support Group (MWFSG), and HM-12 were airlifted by C-5A to NAS Cubi Point in the Philippines. These specialists formed the nucleus of Task Force 78, under the command of Rear Admiral Brian McCauley, for Operation End Sweep. Commander, Mine Force, U.S. Atlantic Fleet had reported to Vice Admiral James L. Holloway III, Commander, Seventh Fleet, in September 1972 as Commander Task Force 78. TF 78 was officially activated in November 1972. However, it became clear more helicopters were needed. Responding to a Navy request for assistance, Commanding General, Fleet Marine Force Pacific (CG FMFPAC) directed that HMH-463 deploy from MCAS Kaneohe Bay, Hawaii, to NAS Cubi Point, to join Task Force 78. On 27 November 1972, with the efficient support of Col. Bill Crocker's MAG-24, HM-463 embarked at Pearl Harbor aboard USS Inchon, which was en route from Norfolk to augment Seventh Fleet Amphibious Forces and to participate in End Sweep.

The ceasefire was signed on 23 January 1973, and the day afterwards, major components of TF 78 deployed from Subic Bay to Haiphong. These included four ocean minesweepers (MSO), USS Inchon, and four amphibious ships, including two with docking capabilities to handle the minesweeping sleds towed by the CH-53Ms. During the six months of Operation End Sweep, ten ocean minesweepers, nine amphibious ships, six fleet tugs, three salvage ships, and nineteen destroyers operated in Task Force 78 in the vicinity of Haiphong.'

As of 2010, Commander Naval Forces Korea, an administrative liaison unit between USFK, the ROK Navy, and Seventh Fleet, has been assigned the TF 78 designation. Naval Forces Korea is headquartered at Busan and has a base at Chinhae, Commander Fleet Activities Chinhae.

Task Force 79 – The Marine expeditionary unit or Landing Force assigned to the fleet, consisting of at least a reinforced Marine battalion and its equipment. This unit is separate from the Marine Expeditionary Unit (MEU) normally embarked in USS Bonhomme Richard Amphibious Readiness Group (ARG). Marine units serving in 7th Fleet are normally drawn from III Marine Expeditionary Force based in Okinawa, Japan.

== Forward-deployed Seventh Fleet ships ==
=== U.S. Fleet Activities Yokosuka, Japan ===
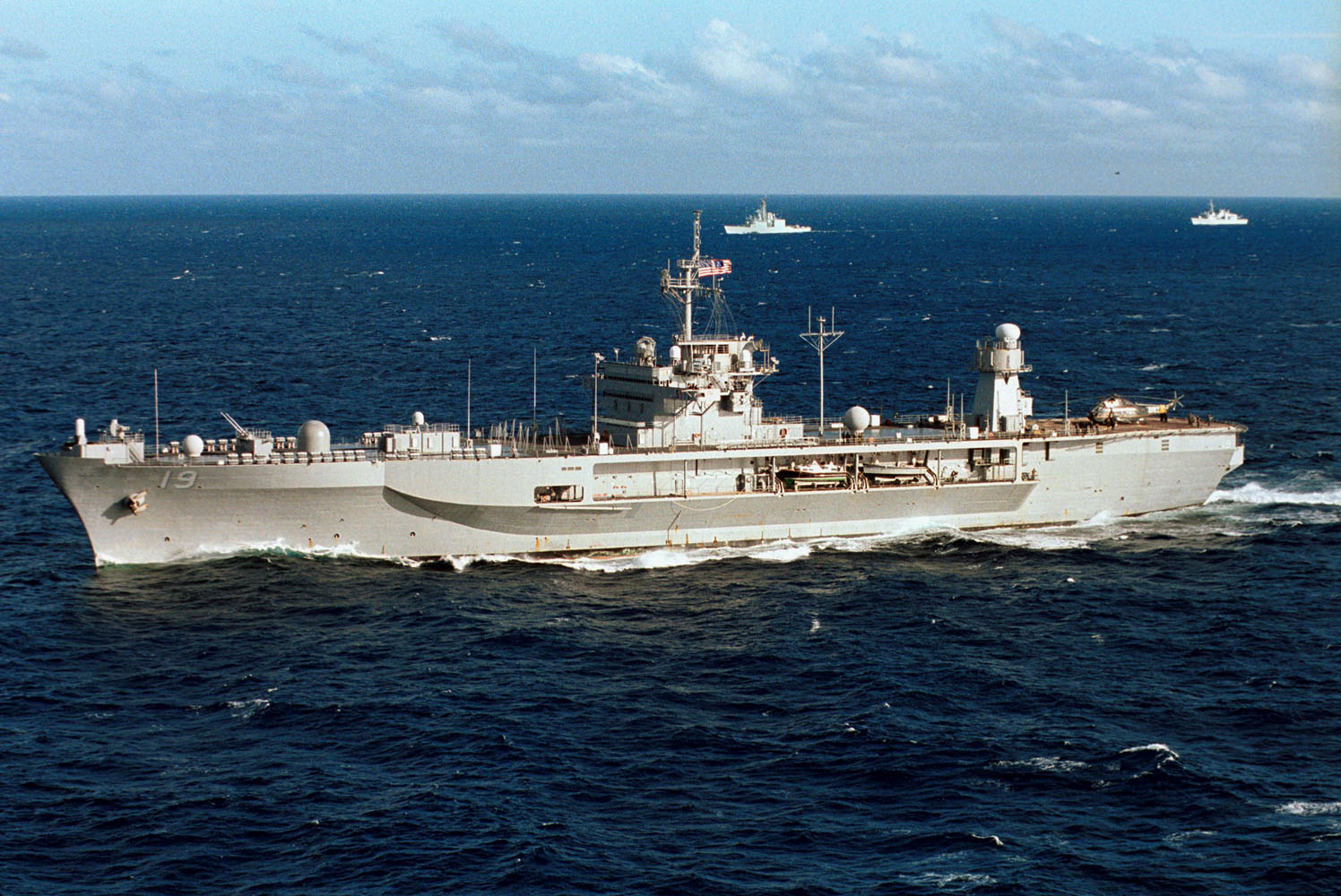
The USS Blue Ridge, flagship, U.S. Seventh Fleet.

- Carrier Strike Group Five: USS George Washington (CVN-73) and USS Robert Smalls (CG-62).
- Destroyer Squadron 15: USS Benfold (DDG-65), USS Milius (DDG-69), USS Higgins (DDG-76), USS Howard (DDG-83), USS McCampbell (DDG-85), USS Shoup (DDG-86), USS Preble (DDG-88), USS Dewey (DDG-105), USS John Finn (DDG-113), USS Ralph Johnson (DDG-114) and USS Rafael Peralta (DDG-115).
- USS Blue Ridge (LCC-19) (flagship)

=== U.S. Fleet Activities Sasebo, Japan ===
- USS America (LHA-6)
- USS New Orleans (LPD-18)
- USS Green Bay (LPD-20)
- USS Rushmore (LSD-47)
- USS Ashland (LSD-48)
- USS Patriot (MCM-7)
- USS Pioneer (MCM-9)
- USS Warrior (MCM-10)
- USS Chief (MCM-14)

=== Apra Harbor, Guam ===
- USS Emory S. Land (AS-39)
- USS Frank Cable (AS-40)
- USS Key West (SSN-722)

== Fleet commanders ==
The Commander of the 7th Fleet is known as COMSEVENTHFLT.

Vice Adm. Arthur S. Carpender	15 March 1943	26 November 1943
Vice Adm. Thomas C. Kinkaid	26 November 1943	20 November 1945
Vice Adm. Daniel E. Barbey	20 November 1945	2 October 1946
Vice Adm. Charles M. Cooke, Jr.	2 October 1946	28 February 1948
Vice Adm. Oscar C. Badger II	28 February 1948	28 August 1949
Vice Adm. Russell S. Berkey	28 August 1949	5 April 1950
Rear Adm. Walter F. Boone	5 April 1950	20 May 1950
Vice Adm. Arthur D. Struble	20 May 1950	28 March 1951
Vice Adm. Harold M. Martin	28 March 1951	3 March 1952
Vice Adm. Robert P. Briscoe	3 March 1952	20 May 1952
Vice Adm. Joseph. J. Clark	20 May 1952	1 December 1953
Vice Adm. Alfred M. Pride	1 December 1953	9 December 1955
Vice Adm. Stuart H. Ingersoll	19 December 1955	28 January 1957
Vice Adm. Wallace M. Beakley	28 January 1957	30 September 1958
Vice Adm. Frederick N. Kivette	30 September 1958	7 March 1960
Vice Adm. Charles D. Griffin	7 March 1960	28 October 1961
Vice Adm. William A. "Bill" Schoech	28 October 1961	13 October 1962
Vice Adm. Thomas H. Moorer	13 October 1962	15 June 1964
Vice Adm. Roy L. Johnson	15 June 1964	1 March 1965
Vice Adm. Paul P. Blackburn	1 March 1965	9 October 1965
Rear Adm. Joseph W. Williams, Jr.	9 October 1965	13 December 1965
Vice Adm. John J. Hyland	13 December 1965	6 November 1967
Vice Adm. William F. Bringle	6 November 1967	10 March 1970
Vice Adm. Maurice F. Weisner	10 March 1970	18 June 1971
Vice Adm. William P. Mack	18 June 1971	23 May 1972
Vice Adm. James L. Holloway III	23 May 1972	28 July 1973
Vice Adm. George P. Steele	28 July 1973	14 June 1975
Vice Adm. Thomas B. Hayward	14 June 1975	24 July 1976
Vice Adm. Robert B. Baldwin	24 July 1976	31 May 1978
Vice Adm. Sylvester Robert Foley, Jr.	31 May 1978	14 February 1980
Vice Adm. Carlisle A.H. Trost	14 February 1980	15 September 1981
Vice Adm. M. Staser Holcomb	15 September 1981	9 May 1983
Vice Adm. James R. Hogg	9 May 1983	4 March 1985
Vice Adm. Paul F. McCarthy, Jr.	4 March 1985	9 December 1986
Vice Adm. Paul D. Miller	9 December 1986	21 October 1988
Vice Adm. Henry H. Mauz, Jr.	21 October 1988	1 December 1990
Vice Adm. Stanley R. Arthur	1 December 1990	3 July 1992
Vice Adm. Timothy W. Wright	3 July 1992	28 July 1994
Vice Adm. Archie R. Clemins	28 July 1994	13 September 1996
Vice Adm. Robert J. Natter	13 September 1996	12 August 1998
Vice Adm. Walter F. Doran	12 August 1998	12 July 2000
Vice Adm. James W. Metzger	12 July 2000	18 July 2002
Vice Adm. Robert F. Willard	18 July 2002	6 August 2004
Vice Adm. Jonathan W. Greenert	6 August 2004	12 September 2006
Vice Adm. William Douglas Crowder	12 September 2006	12 July 2008
Vice Adm. John M. Bird	12 July 2008	10 September 2010
Vice Adm. Scott R. Van Buskirk	10 September 2010	7 September 2011
Vice Adm. Scott H. Swift	7 September 2011	31 July 2013
Vice Adm. Robert L. Thomas Jr.	31 July 2013	7 September 2015
Vice Adm. Joseph Aucoin	7 September 2015	22 August 2017
Vice Adm. Phillip G. Sawyer	22 August 2017	12 September 2019
Vice Adm. William R. Merz	12 September 2019	8 July 2021
Vice Adm. Karl O. Thomas	8 July 2021	15 February 2024
Vice Adm. Fred Kacher	15 February 2024	13 November 2025
Vice Adm. Patrick J. Hannifin	13 November 2025	present

== See also ==
- NOAA Pacific Islands Fleet
