= USS Minnesota (SSN-783) =

US Navy Virginia-class submarine

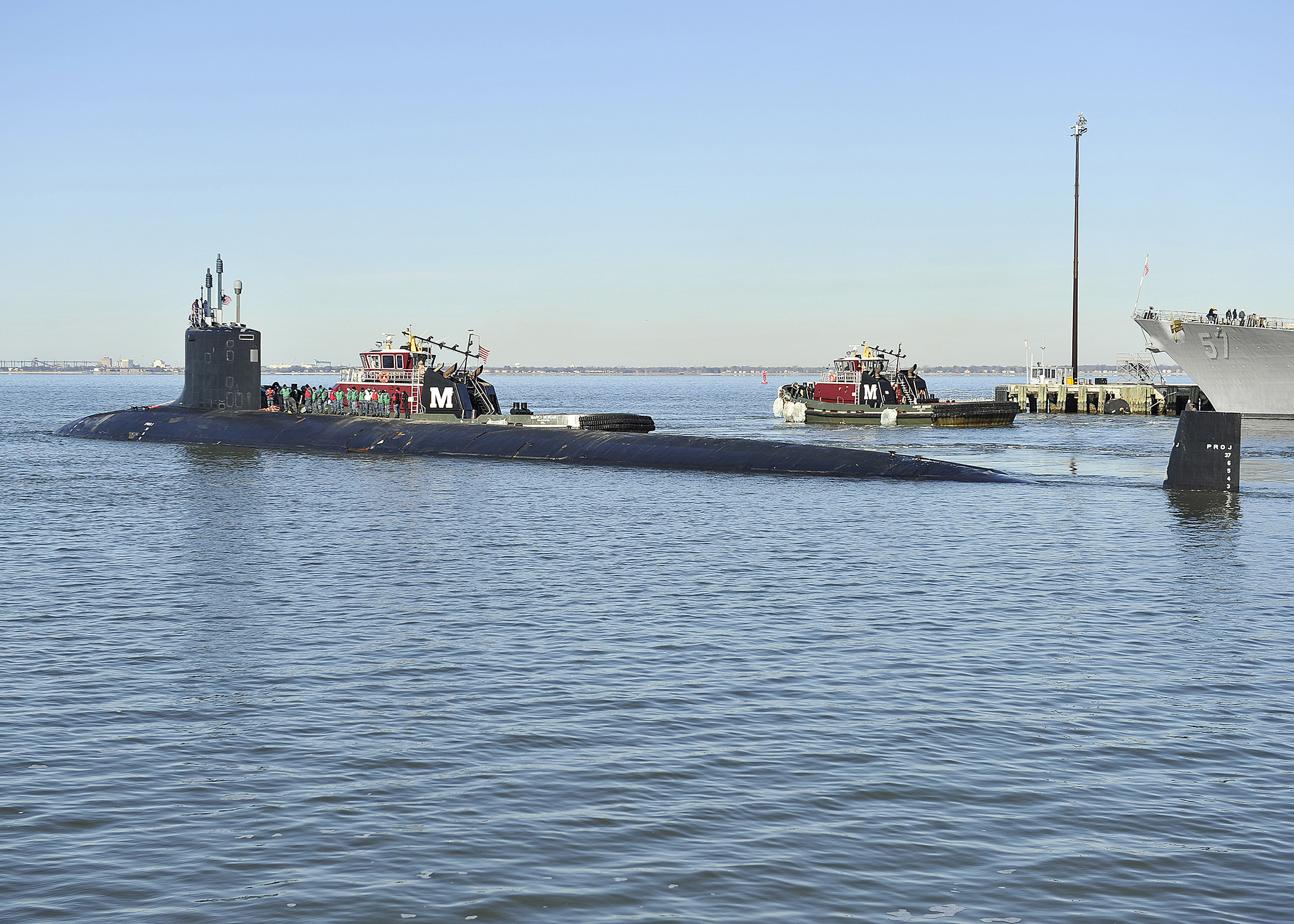
- USS Minnesota (SSN-783) departs Norfolk in January 2014

History

United States
- Name: USS Minnesota
- Namesake: The state of Minnesota
- Awarded: 14 August 2003
- Builder: Newport News Shipbuilding
- Laid down: 20 May 2011
- Sponsored by: Ellen Roughead
- Christened: 27 October 2012
- Acquired: 6 June 2013
- Commissioned: 7 September 2013
- Home port: Naval Base Guam
- Motto: Ex Septentrio Virtus ("From the North, power")
- Status: in active service
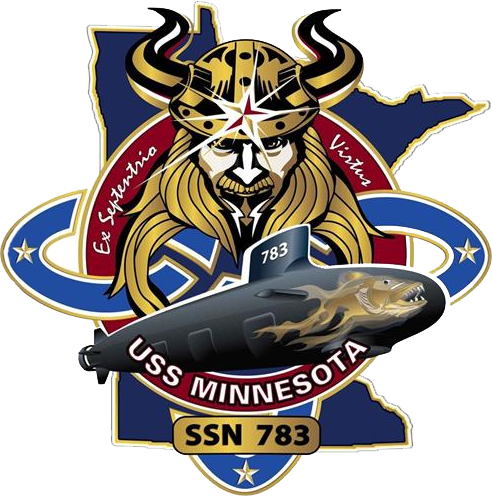
- Badge

General characteristics
- Class & type: Virginia-class submarine
- Displacement: app. 7800 long tons (7925 metric tons) submerged
- Length: 114.9 meters (377 feet)
- Beam: 10.3 meters (34 feet)
- Propulsion: 1 × S9G PWR nuclear reactor 280,000 shp (210 MW), HEU 93%; 2 × steam turbines 40,000 shp (30 MW); 1 × single shaft pump-jet propulsor; 1 × secondary propulsion motor
- Speed: 25 knots (46 km/h)
- Range: Essentially unlimited distance; 33 years
- Test depth: greater than 800 feet (240 meters)
- Complement: 134 sailors

USS Minnesota (SSN-783) is a nuclear powered fast attack submarine, the 10th of the Virginia-class. She is the third United States Navy vessel to bear the name and the second of two named for the state, while the other was named for the Minnesota River.

== History ==
Minnesota was laid down on 20 May 2011, and christened on 27 October 2012 in a ceremony attended by many top ranking officials in the U.S. Navy and Congress.

On 6 June 2013, Huntington Ingalls Industries announced that Minnesota had been delivered to the Navy, nearly 11 months ahead of schedule. Minnesota was commissioned on 7 September 2013.

After commissioning, Minnesota remained at the General Dynamics Electric Boat shipyards in Groton, CT for over two years. A broken pipe joint was discovered in the vessel's nuclear reactor. The pipe had been tampered with in order to make the part appear within specifications. Although a failure of the pipe would not result in a reactor incident, it would affect the reactor's ability to produce steam used for propulsion. The same issue has been discovered on two other boats in the class. A Navy investigation determined that two other ships had the same issue, and the U.S. Justice Department commenced an investigation of the contractor responsible for the defective parts.

On 27 May 2016, Minnesota left the Electric Boat shipyards for her home port, Naval Submarine Base New London in Groton, Connecticut, to prepare for fleet operations.

On 17 March 2022, Minnesota arrived at her new home port, Joint Base Pearl Harbor–Hickam.

On 26 November 2024, Minnesota arrived at her new home port, Naval Base Guam, the first forward-deployment of a Virginia-class submarine.

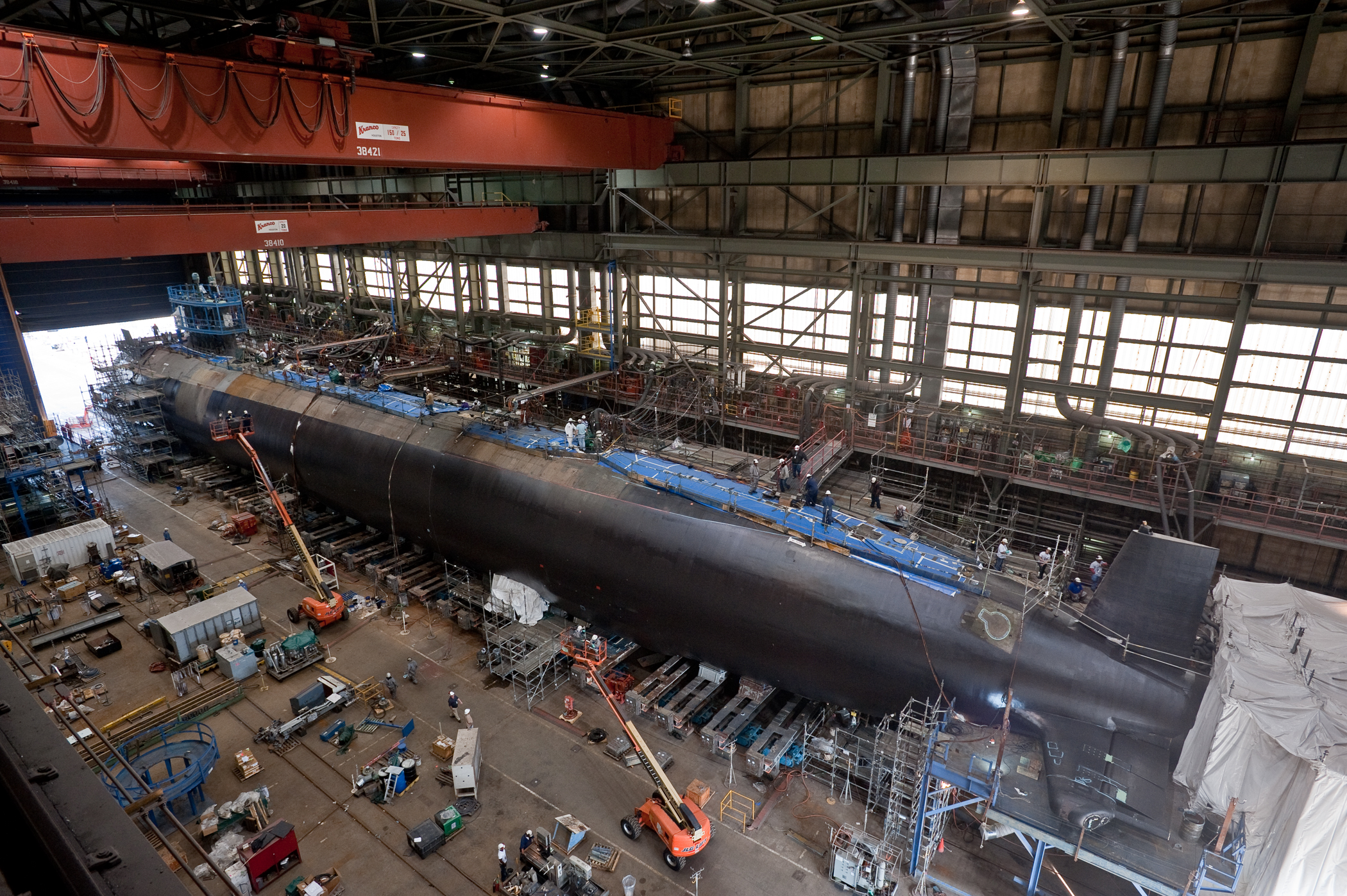
Minnesota under construction at Newport News, VA.

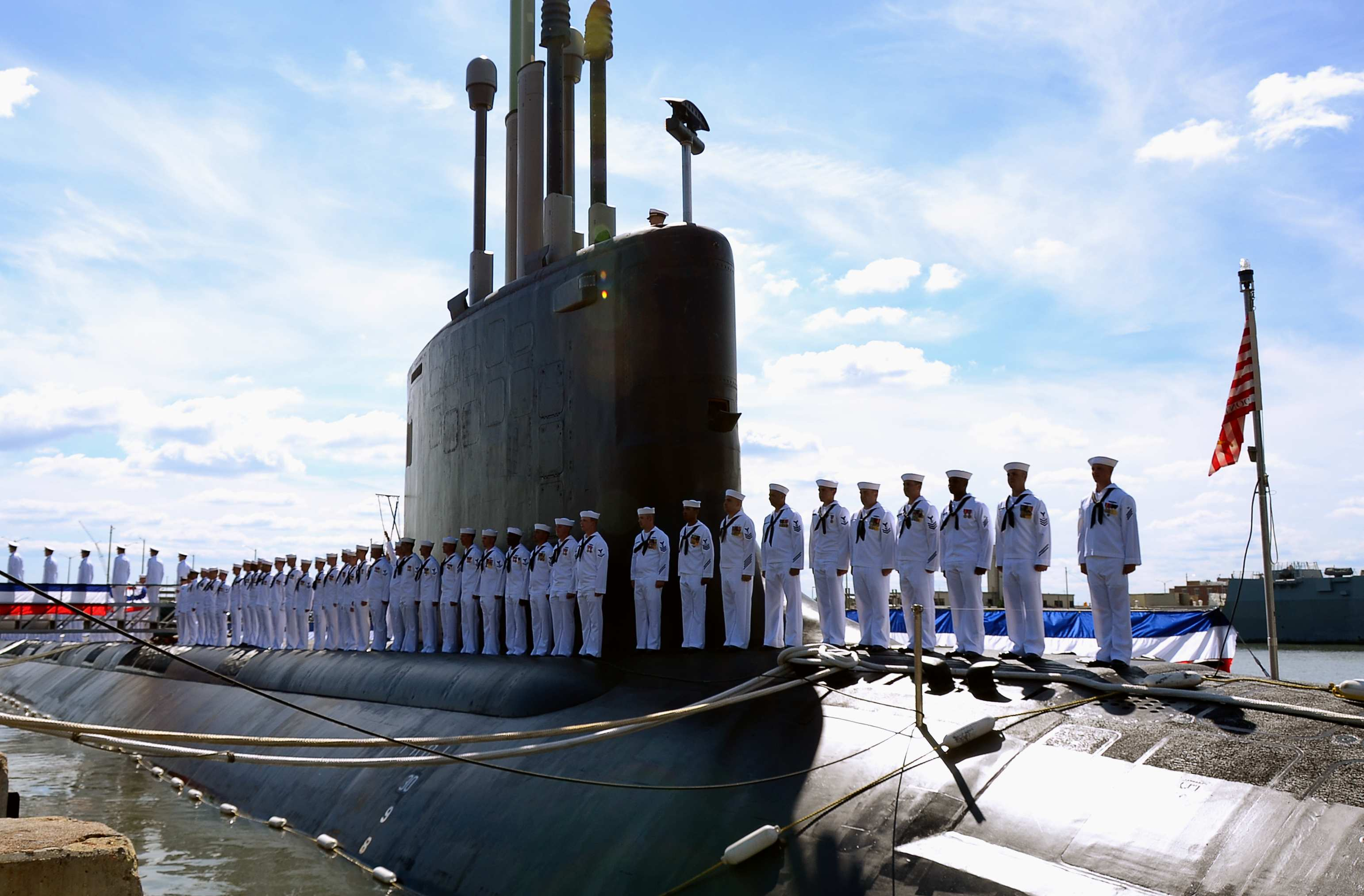
The crew of USS Minnesota mans the ship during her commissioning at Norfolk Naval Base on 7 September 2013.

A Sonar Technician stands lookout in the sail aboard Minnesota as the boat transits Port Canaveral, FL.

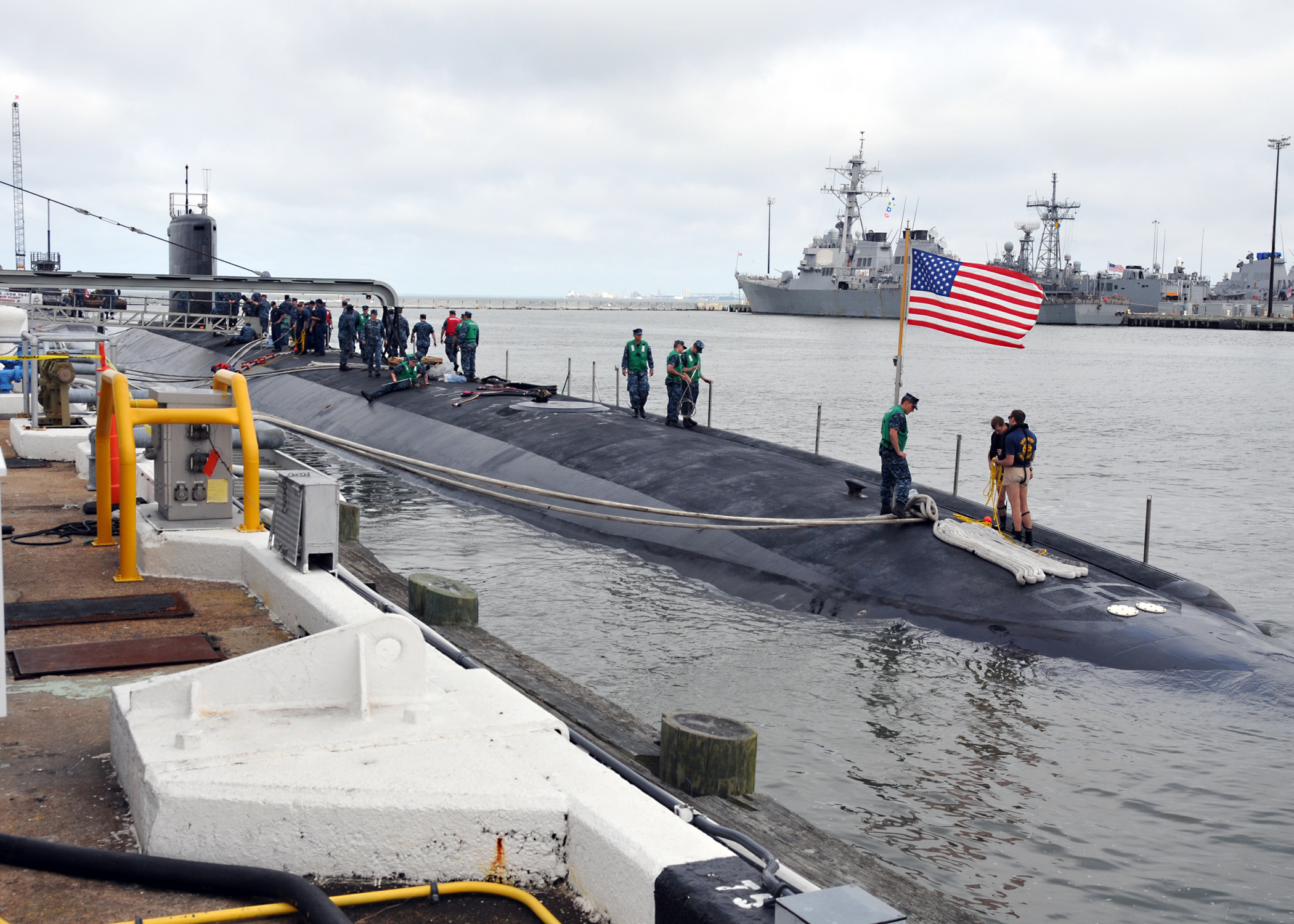
Minnesota pulls pierside in Norfolk, VA.
