= National Oceanic and Atmospheric Administration Pacific Islands Fleet =

NOAA Pacific Islands Fleet
- Country: United States
- Branch: National Oceanic and Atmospheric Administration
- Role: Survey and research
- Garrison/HQ: Marine Operations Center – Pacific Islands (Honolulu, Hawaii)

Commanders
- Commanding Officer, Marine Operations Center – Pacific Islands: Captain Robert Kamphaus

The National Oceanic and Atmospheric Administration Pacific Islands Fleet is one of the three fleets of the United States' National Oceanic and Atmospheric Administration (NOAA).

== Organization ==
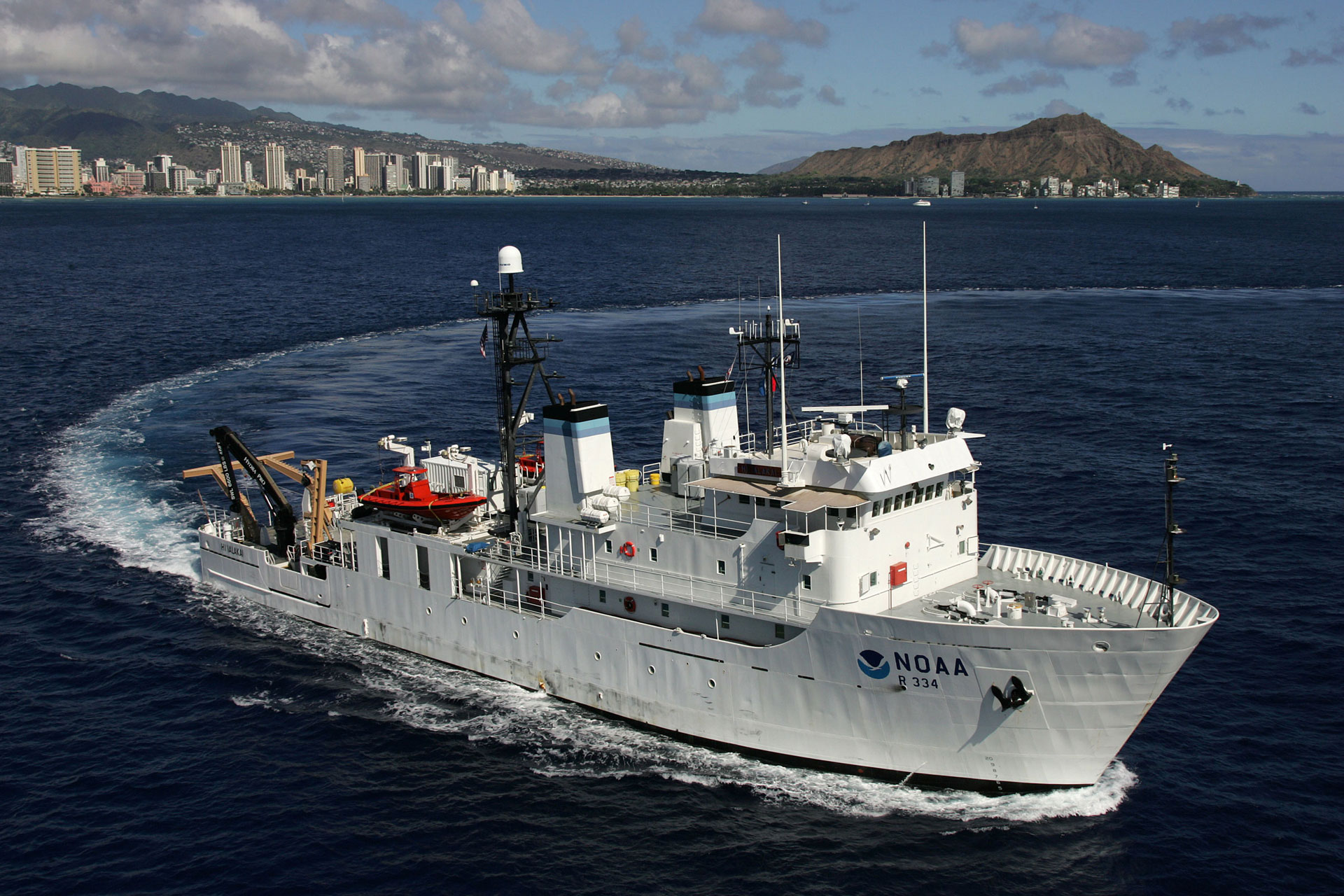
NOAAS Hi'ialakai (pictured) is one of two ships tasked to the NOAA Pacific Islands Fleet.

NOAA Pacific Islands Fleet is headquartered at NOAA Marine Operations Center – Pacific Islands in Honolulu, Hawaii, and is charged with undertaking NOAA missions in the Western Pacific Ocean.

== Ships ==
The smallest of the NOAA fleets, as of March 2016, two ships were assigned to the Pacific Islands Fleet: NOAAS Oscar Elton Sette and NOAAS Hi'ialakai.

== See also ==
- NOAA Commissioned Officer Corps
- United States Seventh Fleet
