= Tonkin Gulf Yacht Club =

Ironic nickname for the US Seventh Fleet

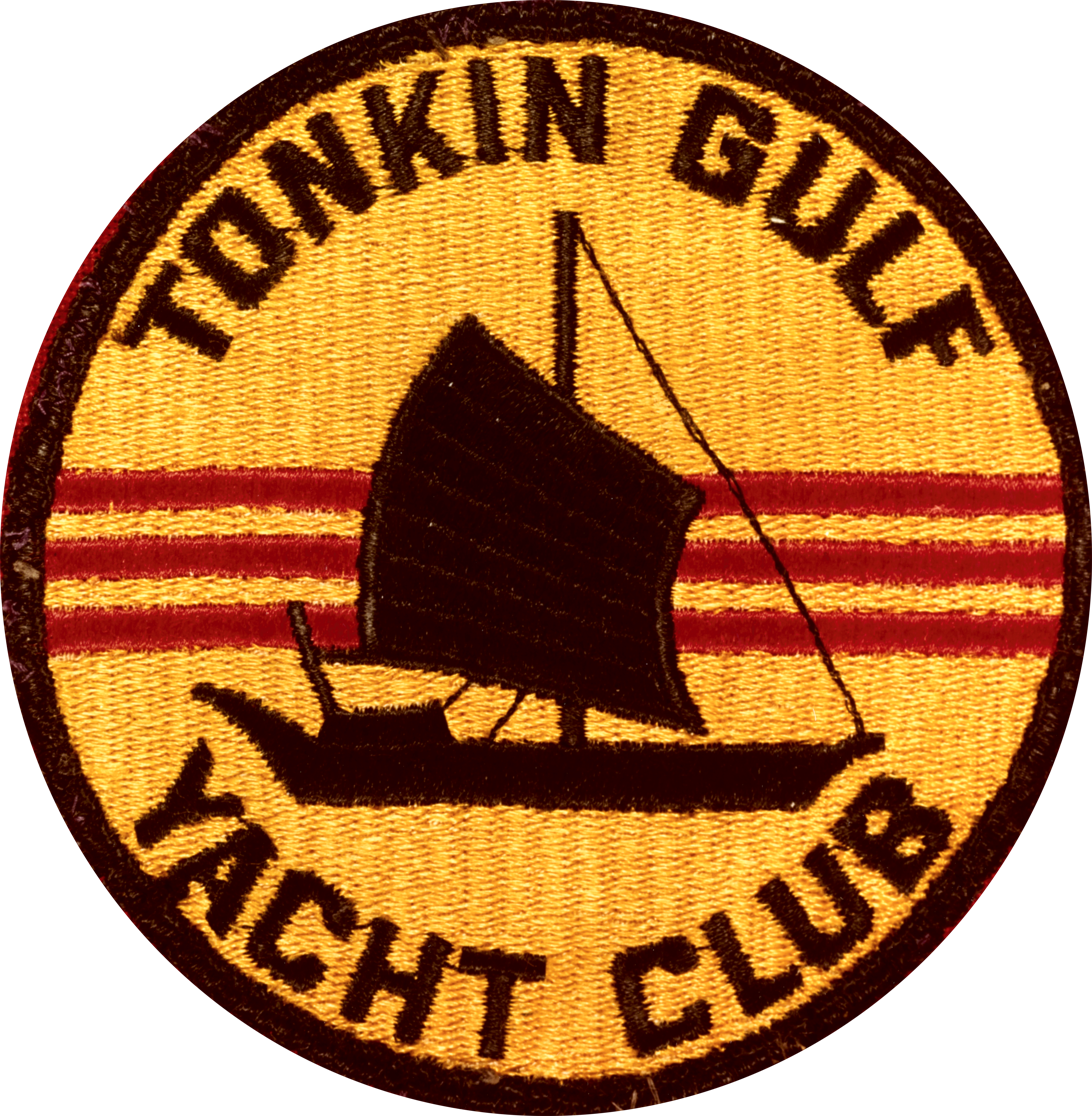
The most prevalent version of the logo shows the silhouette of a Vietnamese Junk with the flag of the Republic of Vietnam in background.

Tonkin Gulf Yacht Club was a tongue-in-cheek nickname for the United States Seventh Fleet during the Vietnam War. Throughout the War in Vietnam, the Seventh Fleet engaged in combat operations against enemy forces through attack carrier air strikes, naval gunfire support, amphibious operations, patrol and reconnaissance operations and mine warfare.

== Naval operations ==
US Naval forces had been introduced intermittently off the coast of Vietnam since March 1950 as "show the flag" tours to reinforce the Republic of Vietnam. In May 1964 three carrier task groups took up position at Yankee Station in the Gulf of Tonkin. Reconnaissance flights were conducted by these carriers, although no combat missions had started. The Soviets had assisted the Vietnamese in the construction of more sophisticated anti-aircraft installations. The Navy sought to bring electronic warfare "DeSoto missions" to identify these installations and sent the USS Maddox (DD-731), leading to the Tonkin Gulf Incident.

The number of vessels dramatically increased, with the "yacht club" including destroyers and cruisers along the coast on the gun line. After the 1973 cease-fire, the Fleet conducted mine countermeasure operations in the coastal waterways of North Vietnam. Two years later, ships and aircraft of the Fleet evacuated thousands of US citizens and refugees from South Vietnam and Cambodia as those countries fell to opposing forces. The fleet departed in 1975.

== The nickname and logo ==
The name "Tonkin Gulf Yacht Club" was used from 1961 when the Seventh Fleet arrived to the waters off Vietnam. Much like the naval traditions of line-crossing ceremonies and plankowner certificates, the club served to commemorate sailors' participation in the campaign. The qualifications for membership broadly construed to any service-member assigned to 7th Fleet, from the ships on the gun line, to aircraft sorties from the carriers, to riverine units, and Marines on the shore. Although unofficial, the term became popular enough to be found in a declassified 1966 command history of the USS Enterprise (CVN-65), one of the vessels of Seventh Fleet. The title and logo have been popular with veterans of Seventh Fleet's involvement in the Vietnam War.
