= Task Force 75 =

Navy Expeditionary Forces Command Pacific
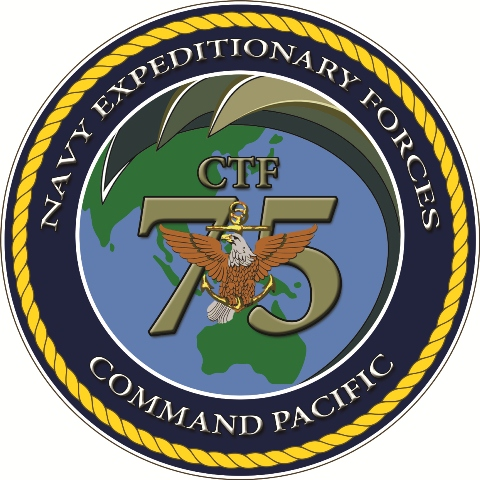
- Crest of NEFCPAC
- Active: 2014–Present
- Country: United States
- Branch: United States Navy
- Type: Command
- Part of: United States Seventh Fleet
- Garrison/HQ: Camp Covington, Guam
- Nickname(s): CTF 75, NEFCPAC

The Commander, Task Force 75 (CTF 75), properly named Navy Expeditionary Forces Command Pacific; or simply NEFCPAC (pronounced "nef-see-pack"), is a US Navy task force of the United States Seventh Fleet and is 7th Fleet's primary expeditionary task force composed of EOD, Coastal Riverine, Cargo Handling, and Seabee detachments. CTF 75 is responsible for the planning and execution of coastal riverine operations, explosive ordnance disposal, diving, expeditionary logistics, engineering and construction, and underwater construction. Additionally, it provides direct support to salvage operations and expeditionary intelligence throughout the Indo-Pacific region as directed by 7th Fleet.

CTF 75 is permanently headquartered at Camp Covington, Guam.

== Detachments ==
The following is a list of detachments under CTF 75 operational control:

Det name	Homeport
EOD Mobile Unit Five	Naval Base Guam
CRG-1 DET Guam	Naval Base Guam
CRS MK VI Company	Naval Base Guam
Navy Cargo Handling Battalion Detachment	Naval Base Guam
30th Naval Construction Regiment	Naval Base Guam
Naval Mobile Construction Battalion Okinawa	Okinawa, Japan
Naval Mobile Construction Battalion DET Guam	Naval Base Guam
Underwater Construction Team Two	Port Hueneme, CA
Civil Action Team Palau	Camp Katuu, Republic of Palau

== History ==
For the landings on Hollandia during World War II, Task Force 75, then as now part of the Seventh Fleet, was made up of USS Phoenix (CL-46), USS Nashville (CL-43), USS Boise (CL-47), and a number of destroyers, including USS Hutchins (DD-476), Daly, and Abner Read.

During the Vietnam War, Task Force 75 was the Surface Combatant Force assigned to Seventh Fleet, responsible for the cruisers and destroyers that were not escorting aircraft carrier. Rear Admiral Rembrandt C. Robinson, at age 47, was Commander Cruiser Destroyer Flotilla Eleven and Commander, Cruiser Destroyer Group Vietnam, Seventh Fleet (CTF 75). Admiral Robinson was killed in a helicopter crash in the Gulf of Tonkin on May 8, 1972, during a late night landing approach to his flagship, the guided missile light cruiser USS Providence (CLG-6). The Seventh Fleet's flagship used to be frequently a cruiser. This cruiser, for example USS Oklahoma City (CG-5), would be assigned the designation of Task Group 70.1 when acting as fleet flagship and also act as part of Task Force 75 when carrying out Naval gunfire support.

From 19 January to 22 January 1981, USS Barbel and Grayback (SSG-574) participated in ASWEX 81-3U off the coast of the Philippines, an exercise in shallow water ASW. The submarines opposed the transit of the oiler USNS Navasota (T-AO-106), which was escorted by the destroyers John Young (CTF 75 embarked) and Elliot, and frigates Gray, Whipple, Lang, Ramsey and through the narrow straits.

In 1981, Commander Cruiser-Destroyer Group 1, at San Diego, also served as Commander Task Force 75, Surface Combatant Force.

In the first quarter of 2016, Exercise Foal Eagle allowed Task Force 75 to "integrate with ROK naval forces to demonstrate the United States’ commitment to the ROK-U.S. Alliance, and enhanced the combat readiness, flexibility, and capabilities of the Alliance. CTF-75 exercised operational command and control of seven subordinate expeditionary task groups and over 400 personnel."

== Events and milestones ==
- 17 January 2014 – The US Navy sends out a notice "establishing Navy Expeditionary Forces Command Pacific" and begins gathering approvals from other type commands.
- 1 July 2014 – NEFCPAC initial operational capability established.
- 9 January 2015 – NEFCPAC is officially established.

== See also ==
- Task Force 73
