= Naval Base Guam =

US naval base in Guam

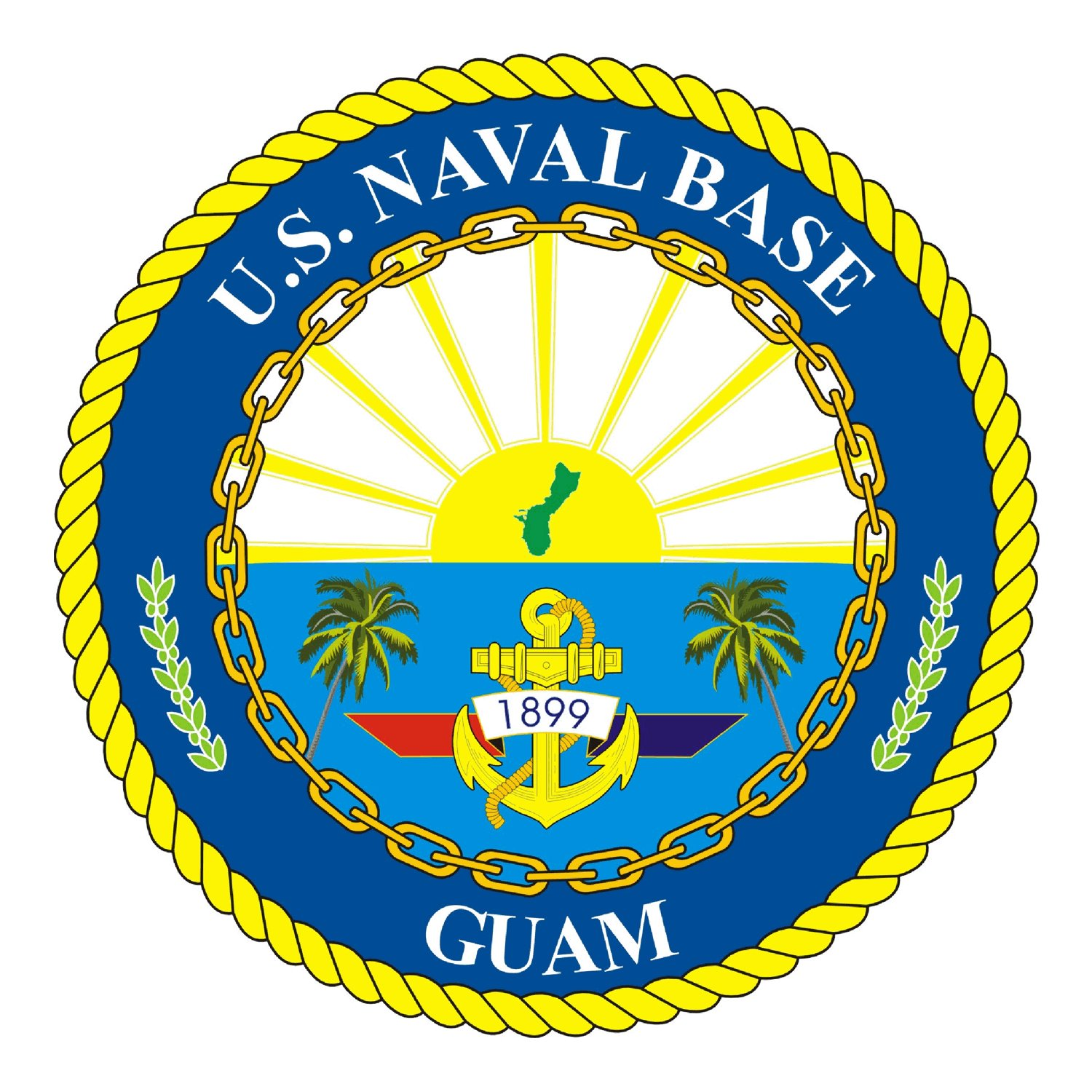
Naval Base Guam
- Part of Joint Region Marianas
- Apra Harbor, Guam
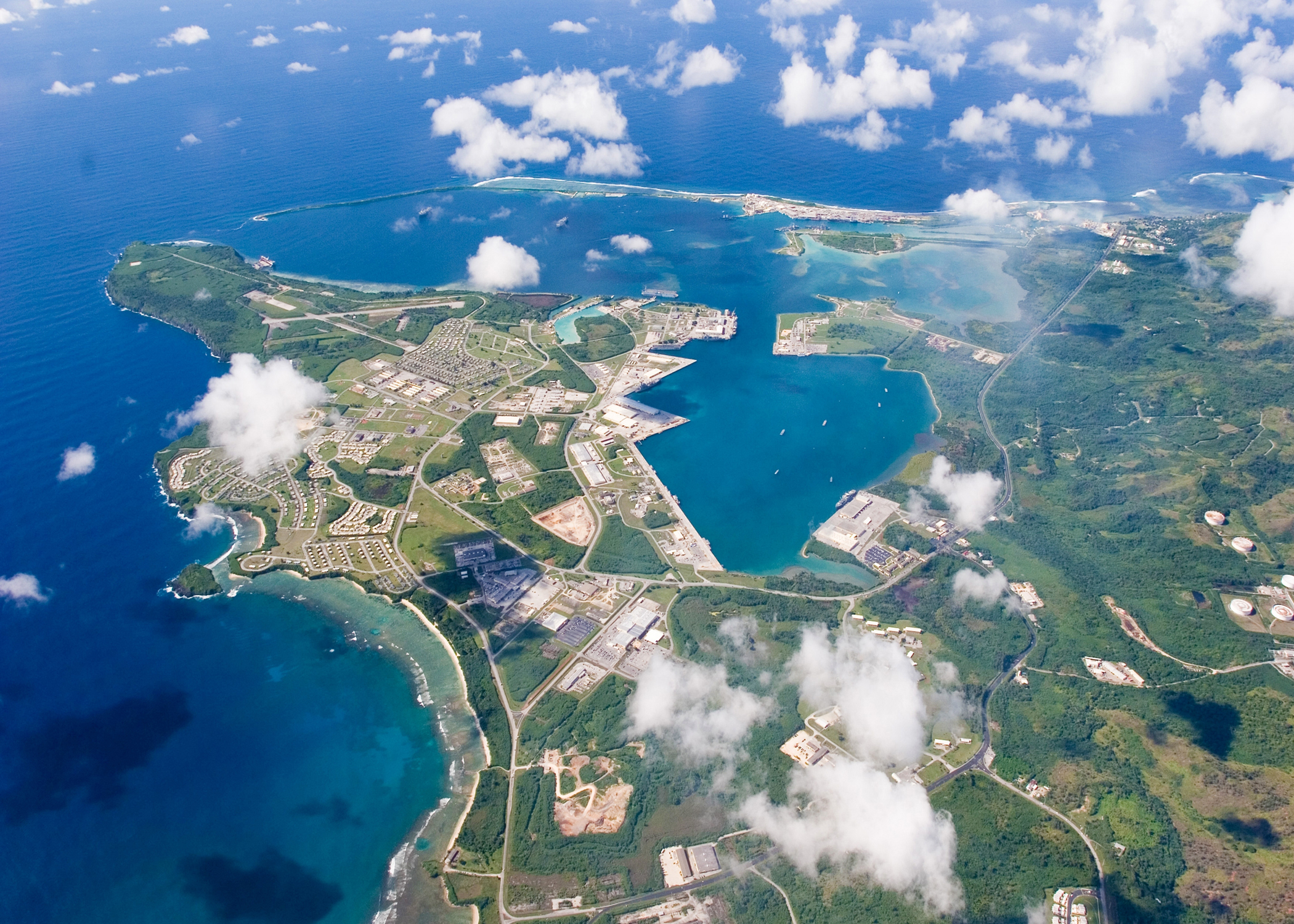
- Naval Base Guam in 2006

Site information
- Type: Naval base
- Controlled by: United States Navy

Location
- Coordinates: 13°26′24″N 144°39′9″E

Garrison information
- Current commander: CAPT Hans E. Sholley

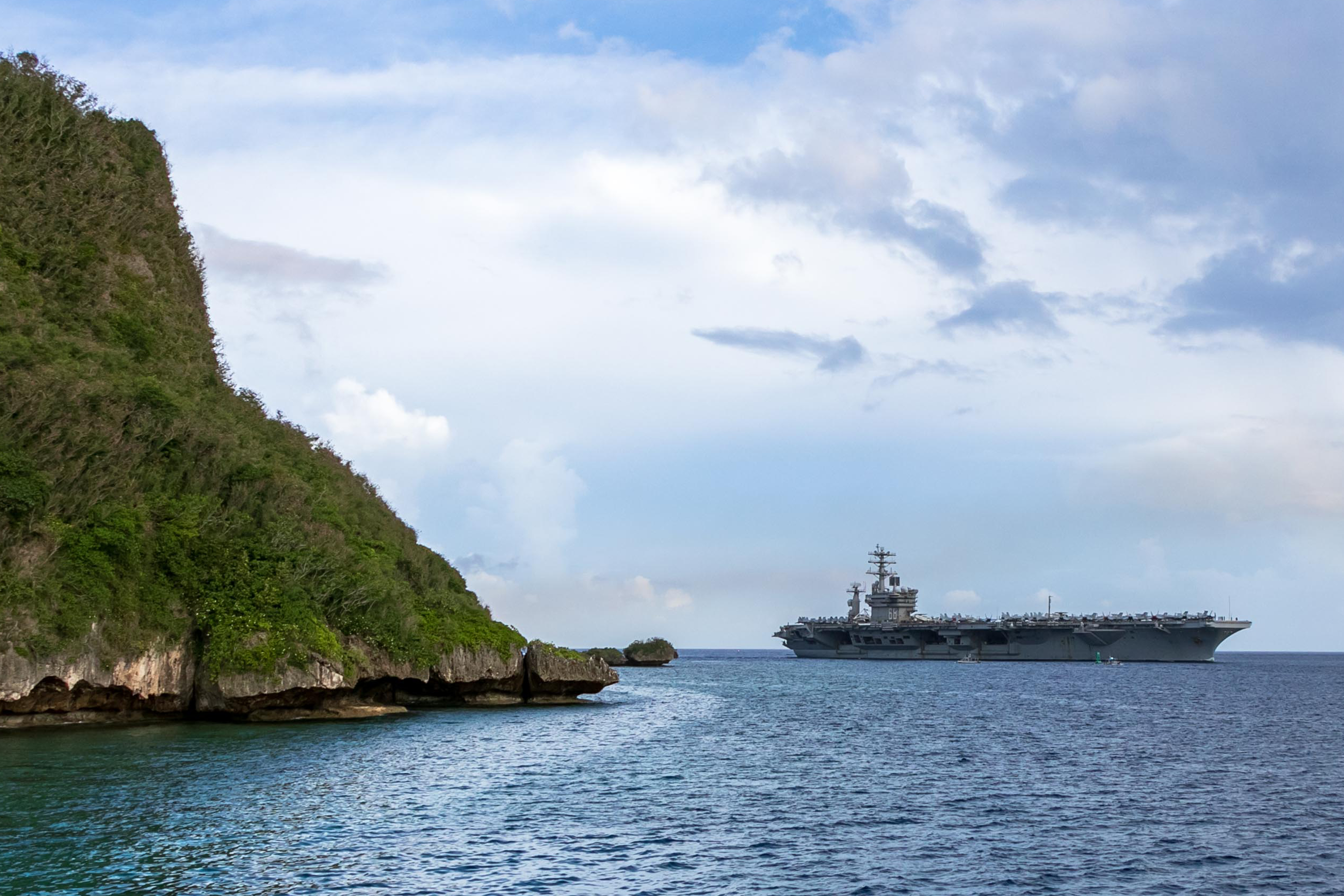
USS Nimitz (CVN-68) enters Apra Harbor on its way to mooring at Naval Base Guam for a scheduled port visit, June 2020

Naval Base Guam is a strategic U.S. naval base located on Apra Harbor and occupying the Orote Peninsula. In 2009, it was combined with Andersen Air Force Base to form Joint Region Marianas, which is a Navy-controlled joint base.

The Ship Repair Facility, Guam, was located next to Naval Base Guam, along Apra Harbor. It was closed in 1997, due to the recommendation of the 1995 Base Realignment and Closure Commission.

Naval Base Guam is home to Commander Submarine Squadron 15, Coast Guard Sector Guam, and Naval Special Warfare Unit One, and supports 28 other tenant commands. It is the home base to dozens of Pacific Command, Pacific Fleet, Seventh Fleet, and Seabee units.

USS Frank Cable is stationed in Guam to tend the submarines of the Seventh Fleet, and USS Emory S. Land changed from Naval Support Facility Diego Garcia to Naval Base Guam to fulfill the same role.

Coast Guard Sector Guam ships include USCGC Sequoia and including USCGC Myrtle Hazard, USCGC Oliver Henry, USCGC Frederick Hatch, and USCGC Washington.

== History ==
Naval Base Guam was founded on August 7, 1899 after the capture of Guam and the Treaty of Paris in 1898.

On July 21, 1944, also known as Liberation Day, American forces declared the island secure from the Japanese Army. The construction was started by the Navy's Lion Six. Seabees from the 5th Naval Construction Brigade built the base on the site of the destroyed US Marine Corps barracks in Sumay, Apra Harbor.

The Navy code named the type of base the Seabees built for its size and purpose, i.e. Oak, Acorn, Lion and Cub. A Lion was a main base for the fleet. Naval base Guam was the first named Naval Operating Base and later nicknamed The Pacific Supermarket. In recent years, expansion of the base has been opposed by many locals in Guam.

== Homeported submarines ==
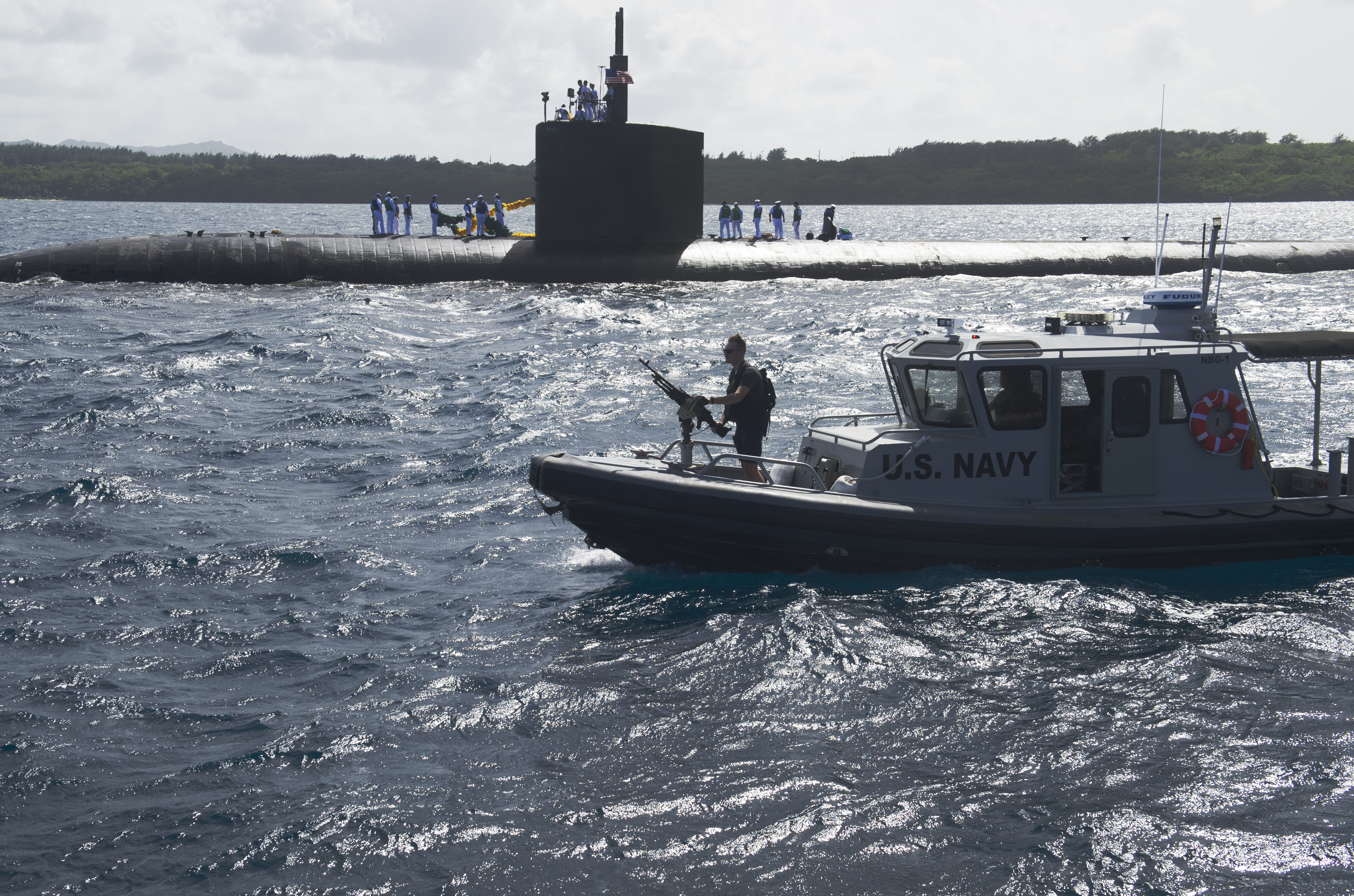
Naval Base Guam Harbor Security Forces escort USS Topeka through Apra Harbor in December 2019

On 26 November 2024, USS Minnesota arrived at her new home port, Naval Base Guam, the first forward-deployment of a Virginia-class submarine.

- USS Annapolis
- USS Asheville
- USS Tucson
- USS Minnesota
- USS Springfield

== Sub-installations ==
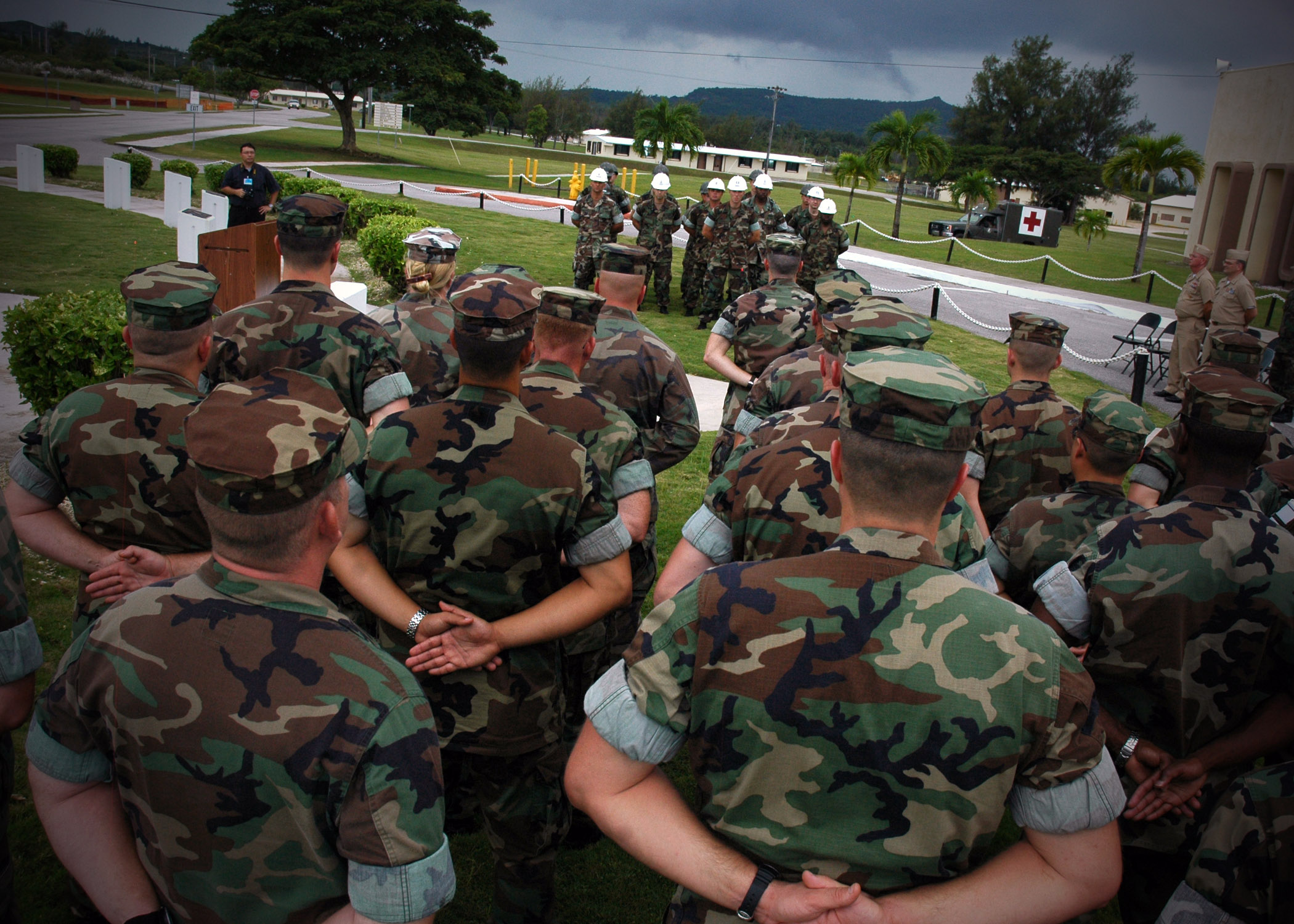
A change-of-command ceremony at Camp Covington

Sub-installations aboard Naval Base Guam include Camp Covington. Camp Covington is one of the three main body deployment locations for the Navy Seabees. Currently, Camp Covington is a deployment site in the rotation of the three Seabee battalions making up the 30th Naval Construction Regiment. The 7th Fleet's Navy Expeditionary Forces Command Pacific is also headquartered here.

The camp has a gym, a cardio hall, and a mini-mart. It has its own barracks for Officers, Enlisted, and Chief Petty Officers; a galley, an armory, dental clinic, and various HQ buildings and warehouses.

== Other commands ==
- Military Sealift Command Ship Support Unit Guam
- Navy Explosive Ordnance Disposal (EOD) Mobile Unit FIVE
- Navy Munitions Command East Asia Division Unit Guam
- Naval Airborne Weapons Maintenance Unit 1
- Naval Computer and Telecommunications Station Guam
- THIRTIETH Naval Construction Regiment

== Services ==
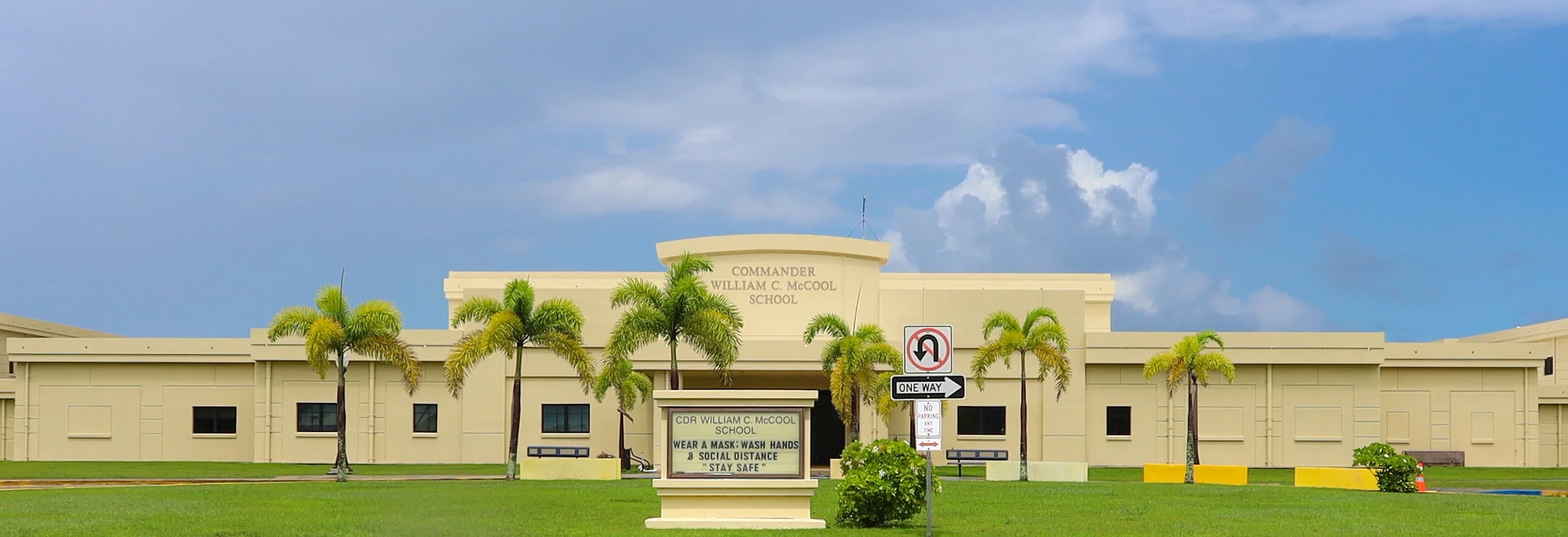
Commander William C. McCool Elementary/Middle School

Naval Base Guam has amenities and services including a library, chapel, visitor's quarters, theater, and bowling lanes.

In regards to the Department of Defense Education Activity (DoDEA), the base is in the school transportation zone for William McCool Elementary and McCool Middle School, while Guam High School is the island's sole DoDEA high school. The McCool school, on the base itself, was previously known as Guam South Elementary/Middle School. On August 29, 2003, it was renamed after McCool.

Non-DoDEA public schools are operated by the Guam Department of Education.

== See also ==
- Ordnance Annex
- US military installations in Guam
- List of United States Navy installations § Guam
- United States Navy submarine bases
- Harmon Air Force Base on Guam

History:

- World War II United States Merchant Navy
- Naval Advance Base Saipan
- Naval Advance Base Espiritu Santo
