= Gulf of Tonkin =

Gulf in the northwestern South China Sea

Coordinates: 19°45′N 107°45′E

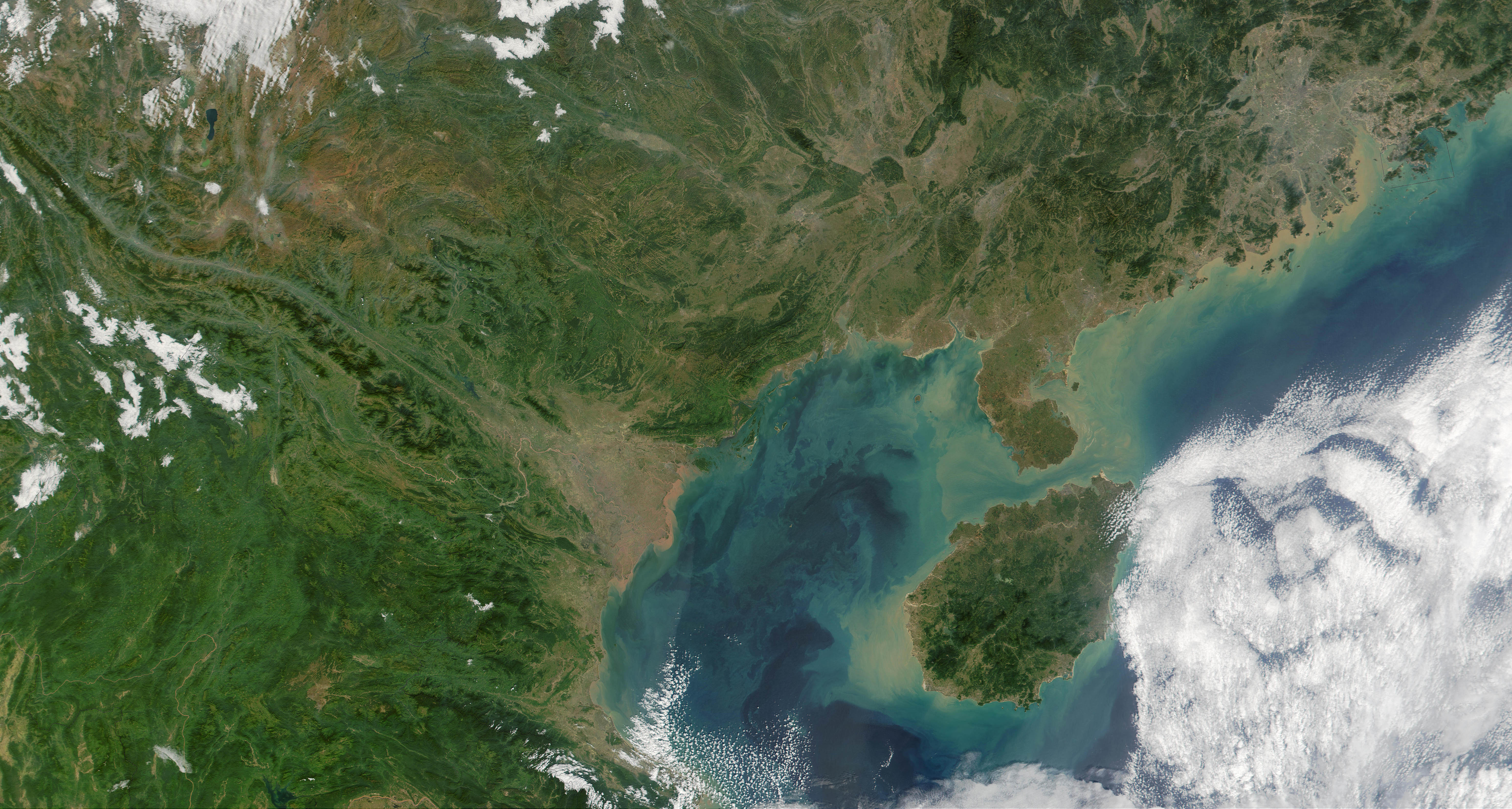
- True color satellite image of the Gulf of Tonkin

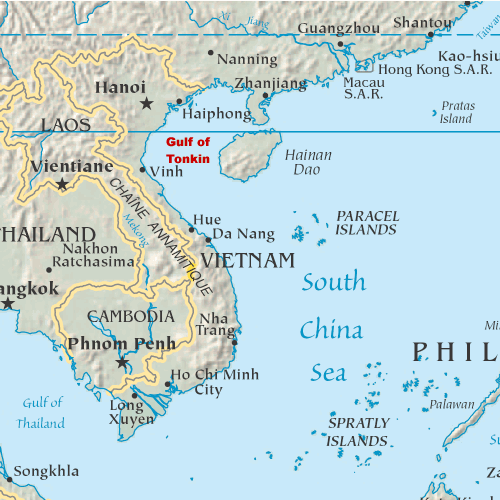
- Geographic location

Chinese name
- Traditional Chinese: 北部灣 東京灣
- Simplified Chinese: 北部湾 东京湾
- Literal meaning: Northern Gulf; Gulf of Tonkin
Transcriptions
Standard Mandarin
- Hanyu Pinyin: Běibù Wān; Dōngjīng Wān
Yue: Cantonese
- Jyutping: Bak^{1} bou^{6} waan^{1} Dung^{1} ging^{1} waan^{1}
Southern Min
- Hainanese Romanization: Pak-pōe oân Tang-kiann oân

Vietnamese name
- Vietnamese alphabet: Vịnh Bắc Bộ; Vịnh Bắc Phần; Vịnh Đông Kinh; Vịnh Bắc Việt
- Chữ Hán: 泳北部 泳北份 泳東京 泳北越

The Gulf of Tonkin is a gulf at the northwestern portion of the South China Sea, located off the coasts of Tonkin (northern Vietnam) and South China. It has a total surface area of 126,250 km^{2} (48,750 sq mi). It is defined in the west and northwest by the northern coastline of Vietnam down to the Cồn Cỏ island, in the north by China's Guangxi Zhuang Autonomous Region, and to the east by the Leizhou Peninsula and Hainan Island.

English sources from the People's Republic of China also refer to the Gulf of Tonkin as Beibu Wan (simplified Chinese: 北部湾; traditional Chinese: 北部灣; lit. 'Northern Gulf').

== Description and etymology ==
The name Tonkin, written 東京 in chữ Hán characters and Đông Kinh in the Vietnamese alphabet, means "eastern capital", and is the former toponym for Hanoi, the present capital of Vietnam. The characters 東京 are the same source for the name Tokyo, also meaning "eastern capital". Tonkin later became an exonym for northern Vietnam, and during the colonial era, referred to a French protectorate.

Bắc Bộ is a native Vietnamese name for the region of Northern Vietnam. The bay's Vietnamese and Chinese names – Vịnh Bắc Bộ and Běibù Wān, respectively – both mean "Northern Bay".

The Gulf of Tonkin is a relatively shallow portion of the Pacific Ocean; the majority of the gulf's ocean floor is less than 75 metres (246 ft) in depth, and no part of the gulf is submerged in more than 100 metres (330 ft) of water.

== History ==
=== Gulf of Tonkin incident ===
On 4 August 1964, United States President Lyndon B. Johnson claimed that North Vietnamese forces had twice attacked American destroyers in the Gulf of Tonkin. Known today as the Gulf of Tonkin Incident, this event spawned the Gulf of Tonkin Resolution of 7 August 1964, ultimately leading to open war between North Vietnam and South Vietnam. It furthermore foreshadowed the major escalation of the Vietnam War in South Vietnam, which began with the landing of US regular combat troops at Da Nang in 1965.

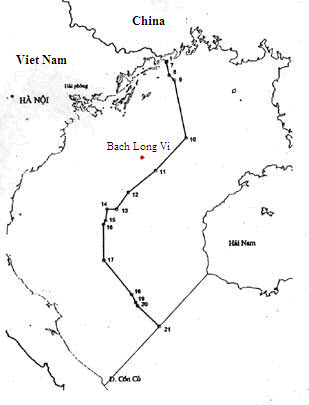
Map of the maritime border between Vietnam and China in the Gulf of Tonkin. The red dot is Bach Long Vi Island

=== Maritime border issue in the Gulf of Tonkin ===
On December 25, 2000, Vietnam and China signed an Agreement on the Delimitation of the Gulf of Tonkin. An Agreement took effect on June 30, 2004, officially defining the maritime border between the two countries in the Gulf of Tonkin.

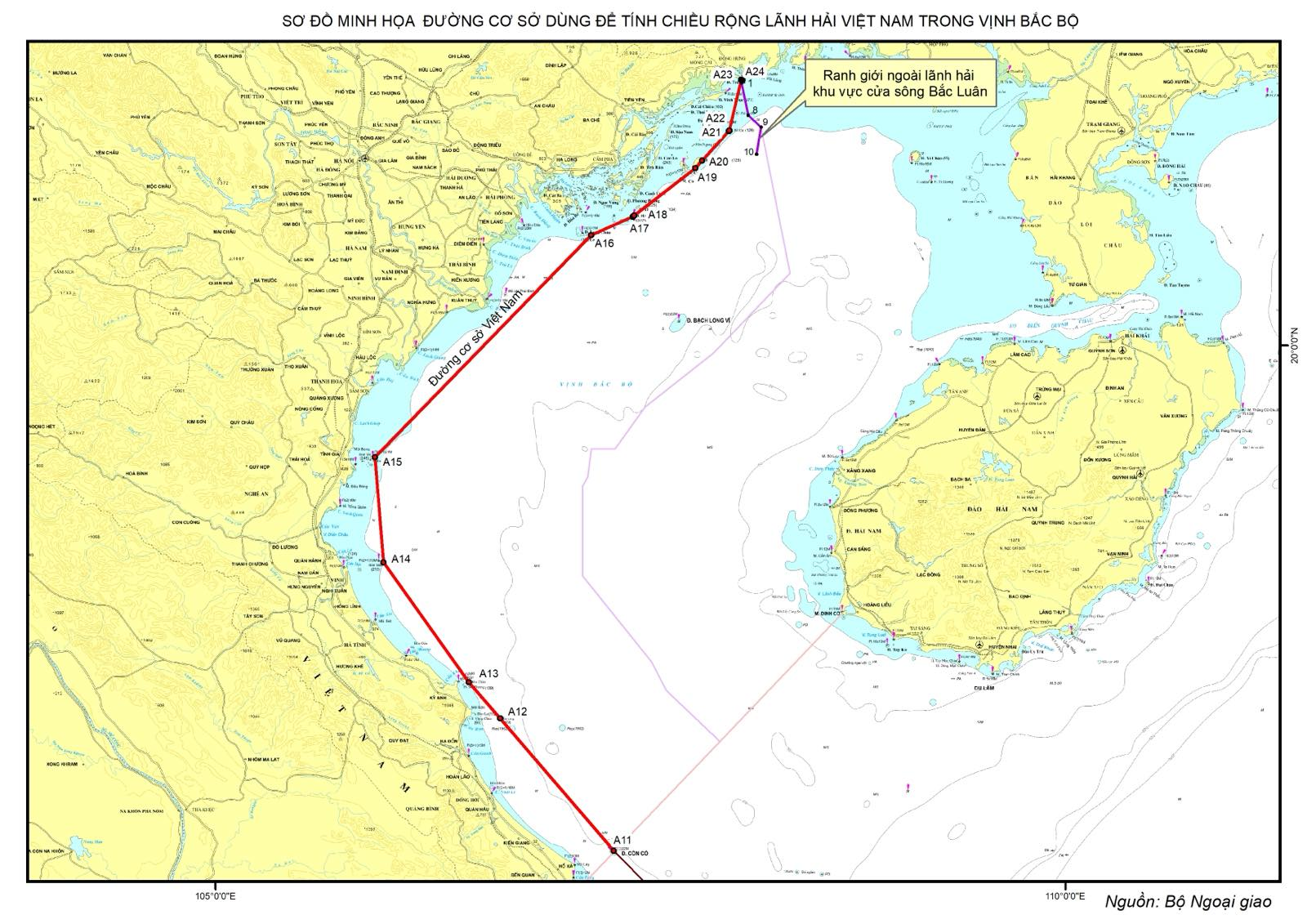
The 2025 Vietnamese declaration on the baselines and width of territorial waters, which was made as a response to the parallel 2024 declaration from China. This map is wholly labeled in Vietnamese language and transcription.

On March 1, 2024, China issued a “Declaration on the baselines of the territorial waters in the northern part of the Gulf of Tonkin”. Vietnam calls on China to respect international law. One year later, in February 2025, Vietnam also announced baseline for determining its territorial waters width in the Gulf of Tonkin.

== See also ==
- Port of Beibu Gulf
- Geography of China
- Geography of Vietnam
- Tonkin Gulf Yacht Club
