= Patrick J. Hannifin (submariner) =

American Navy vice admiral (1923–2014)

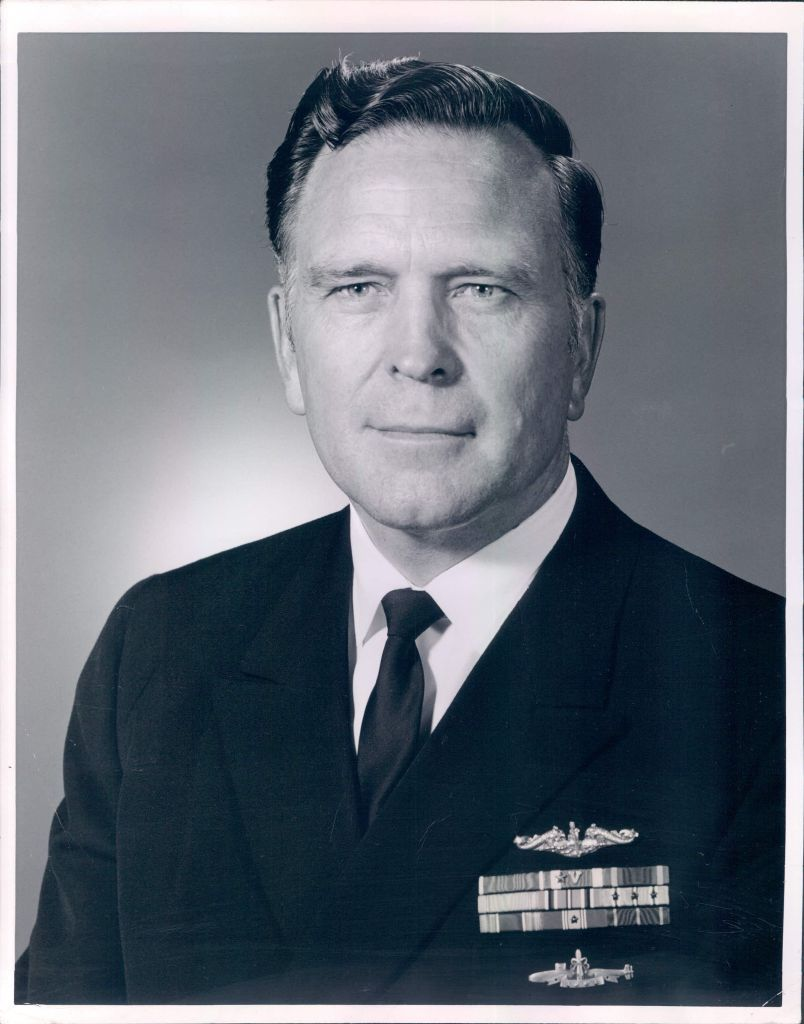
- Born: January 26, 1923; Devol, Oklahoma, U.S.
- Died: January 9, 2014 (aged 90); Solana Beach, California, U.S.
- Relatives: Vice Admiral Patrick J. Hannifin (grandson)
- Military career
- Allegiance: United States
- Branch: United States Navy
- Service years: 1944–1978
- Rank: Vice Admiral
- Commands: Director of the Joint Staff; Thirteenth Naval District; Commander Submarines Mediterranean

Patrick J. Hannifin (January 26, 1923 – January 9, 2014) was an American Navy vice admiral.

Hannifin was born in 1923 in Oklahoma to Steven Patrick and Elizabeth (née Flanagan) Hannifin. He attended the New Mexico Military Institute prior to going to the United States Naval Academy, in which he graduated in 1944. Hannifin served in World War II on the submarine USS Balao (SS-285), and after the war he served on multiple submarines including U-858, SEA ROBIN (SS-407), GRAMPUS (SS-523), RASHER (SSR-269), and he eventually held commands of the USS Diodon (SS-349), USS George Washington (SSBN-598), USS Lafayette (SSBN-616) as well as Submarine Squadron 15, in 1968, which he was given responsibility for all the Polaris submarines in the Pacific Fleet in Guam.

From September 1969 to October 1971, following his promotion to rear admiral, Hannifin served as Commandant of the Thirteenth Naval District. Other flag posts he served included commanding Submarine Group Eight in Naples, Italy, Commander of Submarine Flotilla Eight, as well as Commander Submarines Mediterranean, which he took charge of the NATO submarine forces. He returned to Washington, D.C. in 1973 when he served in multiple positions within the Joint Chiefs of Staff. Following a promotion in 1976 to vice admiral for him to assume the position of director of plans and policy for the Joint Chiefs of Staff, in 1977, Hannifin was given the position of Director of the Joint Staff. He served in this capacity until his retirement in 1978.

Vice Admiral Hannifin was a recipient of the Navy Distinguished Service Medal, the Legion of Merit and the Navy Commendation Medal with one Gold Star and a 'V' for VALOR device.

In retirement Hannifin lived in Solana Beach, California and served as president of HANESCO, Co., in the oil and gas industry. He was married to Mary (née Snyder), whom he married July 12, 1944. They had 3 children. One son, Steven Patrick II also served in the United States Navy. He has also served as a consultant on naval matters that include submarines, appearing on television and news panels to provide analysis on current matters. He also possesses a business degree, which he obtained from George Washington University in 1968. He is a member of the New Mexico Military Institute Hall of Fame, in which he was inducted on October 25, 1985, and he has also received the 2012 Distinguished Submariner Award from the Naval Submarine League. He died in Solana Beach on January 9, 2014.
