= Patrick J. Hannifin (naval aviator) =

American naval admiral

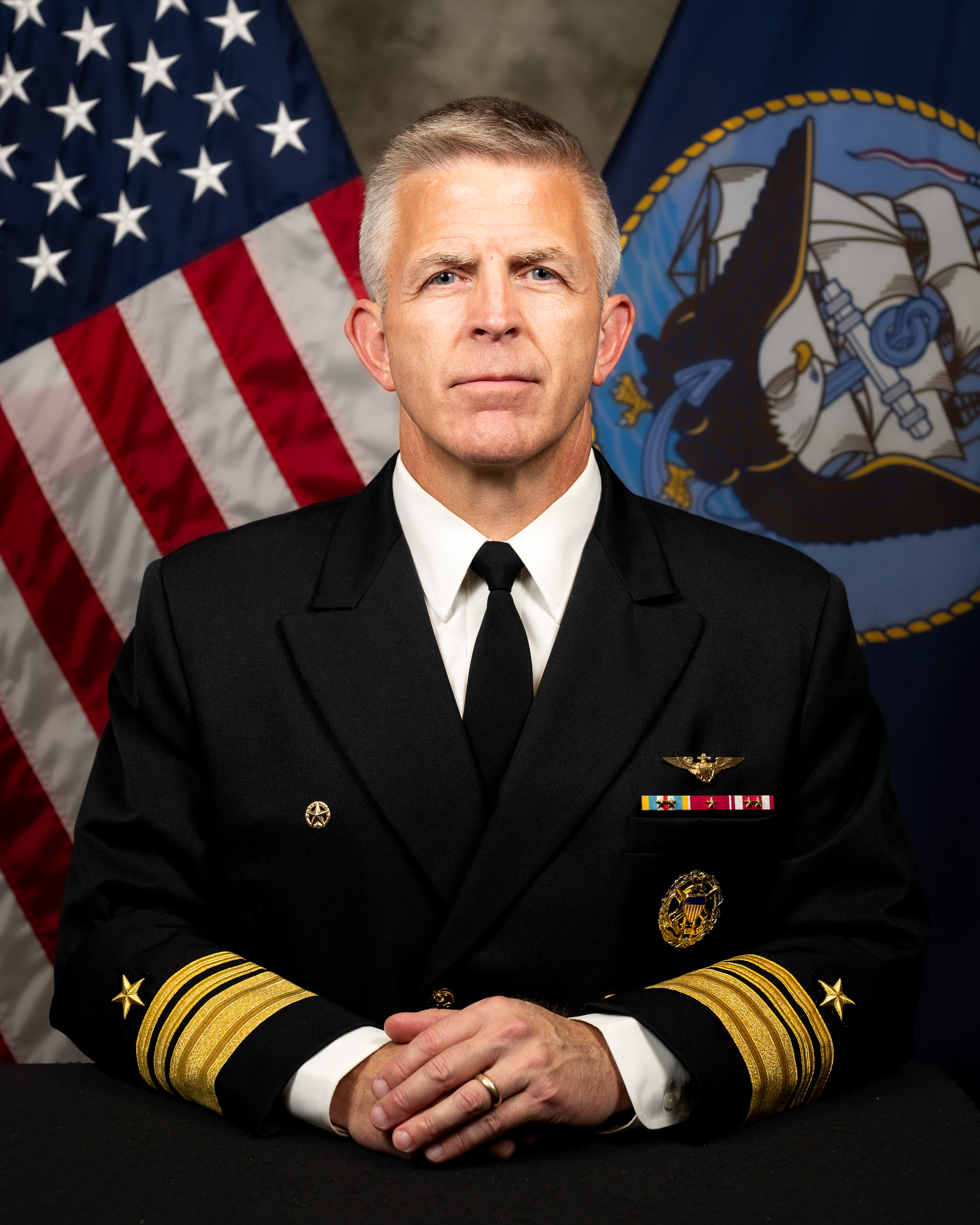
- Alma mater: University of Pennsylvania; University of San Diego
- Relatives: Vice Admiral Patrick J. Hannifin (grandfather)
- Military career
- Allegiance: United States
- Branch: United States Navy
- Service years: 1991–present
- Rank: Vice Admiral
- Commands: United States Seventh Fleet; Carrier Strike Group 5 USS Ronald Reagan (CVN-76); USS Arlington (LPD-24); VFA-81
- Awards: Defense Superior Service Medal; Legion of Merit; Air Medal

Patrick J. Hannifin is a United States Navy vice admiral who commands the United States Seventh Fleet.

A native of San Diego, California, Hannifin was commissioned in 1991 after earning degrees from the University of Pennsylvania and the University of San Diego. Designated a naval aviator, he piloted McDonnell Douglas F/A-18 Hornets, commanded Strike Fighter Squadron 81 (VFA-81), and served as commanding officer of the amphibious transport dock USS Arlington (LPD-24). From September 2018 to October 2020, he was commanding officer of the aircraft carrier USS Ronald Reagan (CVN-76), homeported in Japan.

As a flag officer, he served as deputy director for political-military affairs—Asia, J-5, for the Joint Staff in Washington, D.C., then returned to Japan to embark on USS Ronald Reagan as commander of Carrier Strike Group 5. From April 2024, he served as director for operations at U.S. Indo-Pacific Command.

He was promoted to vice admiral and assumed command of the Seventh Fleet on November 13, 2025, after the nomination of the original choice, Michael P. Donnelly—who had immediately preceded Hannifin in command of both USS Ronald Reagan and Carrier Strike Group 5—was withdrawn after questions about drag performances on USS Ronald Reagan while Donnelly was commanding officer.

His grandfather, also named Patrick J. Hannifin, was a U.S. Navy vice admiral who retired in 1978 after serving as director of the Joint Staff.

Military offices
Preceded by Michael P. Donnelly	Commanding Officer of USS Ronald Reagan (CVN-76); 2018–2020	Succeeded by Frederic C. Goldhammer
Preceded by Michael P. Donnelly	Commander of Carrier Strike Group 5; 2023–2024	Succeeded by Gregory D. Newkirk
Preceded by Frederick W. Kacher	Commander of United States Seventh Fleet; 2025–present	Incumbent
