= List of Army Wives characters =

This is an overview of the main, recurring and other characters of the TV series Army Wives, which ran from 2007 to 2013.

== Main characters ==
=== Denise Sherwood ===
Seasons 1 – 7

Denise Sherwood (portrayed by Catherine Bell) is the wife of Colonel Frank Sherwood. She was in nursing school but dropped out to marry Frank. They have been married for some twenty years and had a son Jeremy who was seventeen when the show premiered. In the Season 4 finale she gives birth to a daughter Molly. Her marriage with Frank very nearly ended in divorce – they had already signed the papers – when she was fired for having an affair with a patient but they reconciled and dropped divorce proceedings before it was finalized. She works as a Registered Nurse at Mercer Army Medical Center, the on-post hospital serving Fort Marshall.

=== Claudia Joy Holden ===
Seasons 1 – 6

Claudia Joy Holden (née Meade) (portrayed by Kim Delaney) was the wife of Lieutenant-General Michael Holden. She and Denise were best friends and have known each other since their children were in elementary school; their husbands served together for many years and were both stationed at Fort Carson when the families first met. She was a law student at Harvard University when she first met Michael, who was a cadet at West Point, but did not finish her studies due to an accident with another former law student. They had two daughters: Amanda Joy and Emmalin Jane. In Season 1 finale, Amanda died when a soldier walked in with a bomb strapped to his chest. He killed 4 people (Amanda included) and severely injured several others. In Season 7 it is revealed that she died of heart failure after a long battle with various health problems. She was in Germany with the First Lady when she died. Her death was especially hard on Michael and Denise.

=== Roxanne "Roxy" LeBlanc ===
Seasons 1 – 6, 7 (special appearance)

Roxanne "Roxy" LeBlanc (portrayed by Sally Pressman) is the wife of 2LT Trevor LeBlanc. She was a bartender in Tuscaloosa when she met Trevor. She comes from a less privileged background and is extremely independent, having had to contend with an alcoholic mother and an unstable home life for much of her childhood and teen years. She has two older boys TJ and Finn. Roxy was married to a man named Jesse when she got pregnant with TJ. After Jesse, Roxy was being comforted by a friend by the name of Whitt and ended up getting pregnant again with Finn. Several years later, Roxy was bartending at a bar in Tuscaloosa when she met her second husband, Trevor LeBlanc. After only knowing each other for 4 days; Roxy and Trevor got married and they packed their belongings and moved in with Trevor at Fort Marshall in South Carolina.

After some difficulty adjusting to her new role as an Army wife, she meets "The Tribe" — the circle of Army wives (and husband) which include Denise Sherwood, Claudia Joy Holden, Pamela Moran and Roland Burton — and becomes close to them. She becomes a FRG leader during Season 6 and helps new Army wives adjust to Fort Marshall. When Gloria Cruz moves to Fort Marshall with her husband Hector Cruz in Season 6, Roxy helps her out by hiring her as a waitress at The Hump Bar and they become good friends. Roxy becomes pregnant with her and Trevor's first child together in Season 3, but ends up miscarrying in Season 4. In Season 6, Roxy becomes pregnant again, this time with twin boys. She names them Drew and Wyatt.

Towards the end of Season 6, Roxy, Trevor, the kids'/Jeremy’s dog Lucky move to Tacoma, Washington when Trevor receives his PCS orders to Fort Lewis in Washington.

Roxy is the owner of the former Jody bar named The Hump Bar. It is a local bar off post popular with the military and her friends. She "inherited" it from Betty in Season 2 when Betty leaves for California after being diagnosed with breast cancer. Gloria is now the manager since the LeBlancs have moved to Washington but Roxy continues to own it.

Sally Pressman made a special appearance in the first two episodes of Season 7. Roxy was on her way to Tacoma, Washington with Trevor and the boys and made a detour to Fort Marshall to attend Claudia Joy's funeral upon hearing the news.

=== Pamela Moran ===
Seasons 1 – 6, 6 – 7 (special appearance)

Pamela Moran (portrayed by Brigid Brannagh) is the wife of Master Sergeant Chase Moran. She was a Boston PD cop before leaving it to marry Chase. The couple have a son Lucas and daughter Katherine "Katie" Eileen. She is frequently seen alone with her children due to Chase's army commitments. She has difficulty dealing with Chase's commitments to Delta Force and the secrecy of his deployments because she never knows when he was going to be called away on a mission.

When Roxy first moves to Fort Marshall she befriends her and the two become best friends, as do their children. They frequently babysit each other's children.

Pamela and Chase end up getting a divorce because Pamela could not handle Chase being away all time at a moment's notice with Delta Force. Pamela moved into an apartment off post and Chase moved into a smaller house on post. After a while, Chase finally went to Pamela with his papers and told her that he requested to be transferred out of Delta when he got hired at a job in California.

Chase leaves the Army and Delta Force in order to spend more time with his family and finds a well-paid management position in California. Pamela and the children stay in Charleston so the children can finish off the school year. In the beginning of Season 6 her apartment is so severely damaged by the hurricane that it had to be condemned and their possessions are too damaged and ruined. Pamela and the kids move in with Roxy and Trevor and their two boys for a while before Pamela decides to join Chase earlier as she and the kids miss him. They move to California at the beginning of Season 6.

Since leaving the show Brigid Brannagh has made several special appearances. In the Season 6 episode "Hello Stranger", Pamela and Chase invite Roxy and Trevor to meet them for the weekend in Miami as Chase is there for a convention. She returns again, in the first episode of Season 7, to attend Claudia Joy's funeral.

=== Dr. Roland Burton ===
Seasons 1 – 6, 7 (recurring)

Dr. Roland Burton (portrayed by Sterling K. Brown) is the husband of Colonel Joan Burton. He was a psychiatrist at the base medical center in Season 1. In later seasons he began working with veterans suffering from PTSD and depression at a private clinic off post. He found his calling working with adolescents and briefly taught at the high school on post and counseled Army children at the base youth center.

During the first season, his marriage hit a rough patch as Roland was dealing with loneliness. He ended up having an affair with a journalist while Joan was away for her 30 day treatment when she was suffering from PTSD. When Roland has an affair, they separate and are seemingly headed for a divorce. They reconcile when Joan becomes pregnant. They have a daughter named Sara Elizabeth and an adopted son David. Roland and Joan name General Holden and his wife Claudia Joy Holden Godparents of Sara Elizabeth.

Roland is the only man in "The Tribe". Due to his training he is often consulted by the wives on various issues and has helped them and their families deal with problems such as PTSD, grief and drug addiction.

In Season 7, Joan gets deployed to Afghanistan, but ends up getting new orders to return home with her brigade after only 2 weeks. Because Joan was going to be deployed for at least a year (or so they thought) Roland accepts a job offer to Johns Hopkins in Baltimore and was going to take the children with him. Roland and Joan get into an argument when Joan gets home from being deployed and Roland still wants to take David and Sara Elizabeth with him to Baltimore. Joan and Roland finally come to an agreement and Roland goes to Baltimore while the kids stay home with Joan.

=== Gloria Cruz ===
Seasons 6 – 7

Gloria Cruz (portrayed by Alyssa Diaz) is the wife of Corporal Hector Cruz. She is from The Bronx in New York City and married Hector after meeting online and a two-day courtship. She struggled to adapt to life as an Army Wife at Fort Marshall as she had never lived outside of New York City before. At first, she rejects help from Roxy LeBlanc. When she realizes that Roxy was genuinely trying to help, they become best friends, replacing Pamela's spot. She often turns to Roxy and General Clarke's wife Jackie Clarke for advice.

Their marital problems begin to affect Hector's performance in the field during training and they were sent for mandatory marriage counseling. They begin divorce proceedings towards the end of Season 6 after Hector has an affair with a girl named Penny. 6 months later, Penny shows up at Hector and Gloria's door being pregnant. Hector takes a paternity test proving that he is the father of Penny's baby. She goes back to New York as she missed her family, but returns to Fort Marshall before Roxy moves to Tacoma with Trevor. In Season 7, Gloria begins dating (2LT) Patrick Clarke, not realizing he is Jackie's son. She decides to stop the relationship as Jackie was her friend and his father Major General Kevin Clarke was Hector's superior officer. When Roxy moves to Tacoma, Washington with her husband Trevor, she was going to sell the Hump Bar to this man, but changed her mind and hired Gloria as a manager for the Hump Bar.

After Hector and Gloria's divorce became final, Gloria moved in with fellow Army Wife Holly Truman while Holly's husband (PFC) Tim Truman is deployed to Afghanistan with Hector's platoon.

=== Jackie Clarke ===
Seasons 6 – 7

Jackie Clarke (portrayed by Kelli Williams) is the wife of Major General Kevin Clarke, commander of the 32nd Airborne Division. They were initially based at Fort Hope but due to massive damage from Hurricane Nina and minimal damage to Fort Marshall, her husband's division is relocated to Fort Marshall in the first few episodes of Season 6. Initially she and Claudia Joy Holden had a tense and awkward relationship as their husbands were competing for a third star, even though Michael and Kevin are on friendly terms and generally oblivious to their wives' rivalry; they later discover that Kevin was passed up for a third star due to political manipulation by Audrey Whitaker, wife of Michael's former CO Major General Bryce Whitaker. Claudia Joy then realizes that Audrey had used the opportunity to get back at the Clarkes for an old grudge and distances herself from the Whitakers.

The daughter of a retired major general, Jackie comes from a well-connected upper-class New England family and her family is said to have been personal friends of the family of former First Lady Jacqueline Kennedy Onassis (the Bouviers). Following family tradition, she attended the prestigious Phillips Exeter Academy. She graduated from Georgetown University magna cum laude and speaks several languages.

Jackie and Kevin have been married for over twenty years. The years of constant moving and long deployments and her husband's workaholic nature took a toll on her and she became addicted to pills. Their teenage daughter Sophie, who is a boarder at Phillips Exeter, is first introduced in the Season 6 episode "Hello, Stranger" and it becomes apparent that mother and daughter are estranged. Their son Patrick graduated from West Point in Season 7. She gradually becomes part of "the tribe" and they rally around her to help her kick the habit when she started taking pills again due to stress. She and Denise, as the older and more "experienced" Army wives, often help out the other wives, especially the younger and newly married ones.

=== Holly Truman ===
Season 7

Holly Truman (portrayed by Elle McLemore) is the wife of (PFC) Tim Truman. She is the youngest of the Army Wives, having married Tim at age eighteen. She is introduced in the second episode of Season 7 when she comes to The Hump Bar in hopes of selling her pies. Roxy, who was in town for Claudia Joy's funeral, visits her and realizes that Holly is having difficulty as this was her first deployment as an Army wife and had baked incessantly to cope. When Gloria gets divorced from her husband Hector, she moves in with Holly becoming her roommate.

Holly and Tim met in high school when she was a cheerleader and Tim was the mascot. Shortly after graduating high school, Tim enlisted into the Army and they were P.C.S'd Permanent Change of Station to Fort Marshall. She becomes a waitress at The Hump Bar to help Gloria out.

At the end of Season 7, Tim has problems with PTSD when he comes home from Afghanistan and ends up choking Holly while in his sleep leaving a mark on her neck. Holly gets closer to the other Army Wives and Tim finally gets help for his PTSD with counseling.

=== Latasha Montclair ===
Season 7

Latasha Montclair (portrayed by Ashanti) is the wife of Corporal Quincy Montclair. They live in Roxy and Trevor's old house with their children and a dog.

Latasha Montclair (portrayed by Ashanti) is the wife of Corporal Quincy Montclair. Before Quincy was in the Army, he was a chef. Latasha is a stay-at-home mother of three children Gabe, Nyah, and Deuce. They currently live in Roxy and Trevor's old house on post next door to Maggie Hall, her husband Eddie and their children Tanner and Caroline.

=== Colonel Kat Young ===
Season 7

Colonel Katherine "Kat" Young (portrayed by Brooke Shields) is an officer in the United States Air Force stationed at the nearby Air Base which merged with Fort Marshall to form a joint base. She is a C-17 pilot. She hardly touched down in her new assignment at Joint Base Marshall Bring before she clashes with Army General Michael Holden. She is a fierce advocate for the Air Force and she and Holden jockey for their respective branches at the highest levels of power on base. Her and Michael Holden end up getting into a possible relationship at the middle to end of Season 7.

=== Lieutenant General Michael Holden ===
Seasons 1 – 7

Lieutenant General Michael James Holden (portrayed by Brian McNamara) is the commander of the (fictional) XVII Airborne Corps, the formation to which the 32nd Airborne Division and the former 23rd Airborne Division belong to. He is first introduced as a colonel and a senior officer in the 23rd Airborne Division headquarters. Later in Season 1 he became the acting garrison commander of Fort Marshall, taking over Brigadier General Baker after the latter suffered a brain aneurysm. Baker was forced to retire on medical grounds and Michael was promoted and his position made permanent. In Season 3, after a brief stint at NATO, he became commander of the 23rd Airborne Division and received his second star by the conclusion of the season. He became corps commander in Season 6 in conjunction with his promotion to lieutenant general.

Michael was happily married to the late Claudia Joy Holden, whom he first met as fresh graduate from West Point. They had two daughters, Amanda Joy and Emmalin Jane.

=== Colonel Frank Sherwood ===
Seasons 1 – 2 (recurring), 3 – 7 (main)

Colonel Frank Sherwood (portrayed by Terry Serpico) is commander of the 1st Brigade, 32nd Airborne Division and husband of Denise Sherwood. He was an enlisted man and worked his way up the ranks before attending OCS and gaining a commission. He was a major and a company commander when the show first premiered. In Season 3 he was promoted to lieutenant colonel and made then-Brigadier General Holden's G-3 at Division headquarters. When Fort Marshall was announced to be closed and the 23rd Division disbanded, Michael recommended him for the position of commander of the 173rd Airborne Brigade in Italy but instead he was scheduled to be "PCS-ed" to Fort Hope in North Carolina and made a brigade commander in the 32nd Airborne Division based there. Due to the hurricane and structural damage to Fort Hope, the 32nd instead moves south to Fort Marshall and he and Denise remain at Fort Marshall. Besides his responsibilities as brigade commander he also serves in the Office of the Joint Chiefs of Staff at The Pentagon and frequently travels to Washington DC.

His and Lieutenant General Michael Holden's wives and children are best friends. Their paths crossed several times, both of them having been stationed at Fort Carson and Fort Bliss around the same time before reuniting again at Fort Marshall.

He and Denise had a son Jeremy, who was killed in action during a mission in Afghanistan. Their daughter Molly was born while Frank and Jeremy were in Afghanistan, just weeks before Jeremy's death. He missed both his children's birth; he was deployed when Jeremy was born and in Afghanistan during Molly's birth, although he was able to witness it via webcam.

Frank and Denise married young, having met while he was stationed at Fort Bliss and she a nursing student at the nearby hospital. In Season 2 their marriage nearly fell apart when she had an extramarital affair with a patient and lost her job at the hospital on post. They agreed to separate but chose not to tell Jeremy as he was about to deploy and they hoped to spare him the pain but unfortunately Jeremy eventually found out himself. Towards the end of the season the couple reconcile and drop divorce proceedings.

Actor Terry Serpico is the son of a retired career Army officer and stated that the character was partly based on his father.

==== Awards and decorations ====
The following are the medals and service awards fictionally worn by Colonel Sherwood.

Personal decorations
Width-44 crimson ribbon with a pair of width-2 white stripes on the edges	Legion of Merit
	Bronze Star Medal
	Defense Meritorious Service Medal
Width-44 crimson ribbon with two width-8 white stripes at distance 4 from the edges.	Meritorious Service Medal
Width-44 myrtle green ribbon with width-3 white stripes at the edges and five width-1 stripes down the center; the central white stripes are width-2 apart	Army Commendation Medal with one silver oak leaf cluster
Width-44 ribbon with two width-9 ultramarine blue stripes surrounded by two pairs of two width-4 green stripes; all these stripes are separated by width-2 white borders	Army Achievement Medal with one silver oak leaf cluster
Unit awards
Width-44 Old Glory red ribbon surrounded by gold frame. The ribbon has a central width-3 Old Glory red stripe flanked by pairs of stripes that are respectively width-3 white, width-3 ultramarine blue, width one-half white and width-2 ultramarine blue.	Valorous Unit Award with one bronze oak leaf cluster
Width-44 red ribbon surrounded by gold frame. The ribbon has a central width-8 green stripe flanked by a pair of width-1 yellow stripes.	Superior Unit Award
Campaign and service medals
	National Defense Service Medal with bronze service star
	Southwest Asia Service Medal with two bronze service stars
	Iraq Campaign Medal with bronze service star
	Global War on Terrorism Service Medal
	Humanitarian Service Medal
	Outstanding Volunteer Service Medal
Service and training awards
	Army Service Ribbon
	Overseas Service Ribbon
Foreign awards
	NATO Medal
	Kuwait Liberation Medal (Saudi Arabia)
	Kuwait Liberation Medal (Kuwait)

Other accoutrements
Combat Infantryman Badge
Master Parachutist Badge
Air Assault Badge
Pathfinder Badge
32nd Airborne Division Combat Service Identification Badge
Ranger tab
Office of the Joint Chiefs of Staff Identification Badge
Mexican Parachutist Foreign Jump Wings

=== Colonel Joan Burton ===
Seasons 1 – 7

Colonel Joan Burton (portrayed by Wendy Davis) is the wife of Dr. Roland Burton. She comes from the tough neighborhoods of Chicago and her underprivileged background motivated her to carve out a career on her own. In Season 1 she has just returned from a deployment and her PTSD causes a breakdown between her and Roland. They nearly file for divorce but drop it once she announces that she is pregnant.

At the start of the show she was a lieutenant colonel and becomes XO to then-Colonel Michael Holden later in the first season. She is then promoted to colonel and later becomes garrison commander of Fort Marshall. Previously she was a G-2 (intelligence). She retires from the Army in Season 7.

Joan and Roland have a daughter Sara Elizabeth, whose godparents are Michael and Claudia Joy Holden, and a son David. They adopted David in Season 5 and his adoption was finalized in the Season 6 premiere "Winds of War".

=== Colonel Katherine "Kat" Young ===
Season 7

Colonel Katherine "Kat" Young (portrayed by Brooke Shields) is an officer in the US Air Force stationed at the nearby Air Force Base which merged with Fort Marshall to form a joint base. She is introduced in the episode "Brace for Impact". Her daughter is a student at The Citadel and is expected to follow her mother into the "family business" (the Air Force).

=== Corporal Hector Cruz ===
Seasons 6 – 7

Corporal Hector Cruz (portrayed by Joseph Julian Soria) is a soldier in the 32nd Airborne Division and husband of Gloria Cruz. The character first appeared in the episode "Viral".

Hector is introduced as a young and inexperienced private first class in 2LT Trevor LeBlanc's platoon. He had been married to New York City girl Gloria for about three weeks when he first arrives at Fort Marshall. They met online on a dating site and corresponded for about a month. He proposed two days after meeting her face-to-face. She moves down to Fort Marshall to join him.

Gloria struggled to adapt to life as an Army wife and at Fort Marshall and it concerned Hector. Trevor learns about it and asks Roxy, who is now the Company's FRG leader, to visit her. As Hector lived in the barracks before getting married, he was naive about paying bills and expenses and Trevor, as his platoon leader, was forced to step in and intervene. Roxy offers Gloria a job at The Hump Bar to help with finances. Hector demands she quit after he punched a soldier for behaving inappropriately around her but she refuses as Roxy was pregnant and had to cut down on her workload. The disagreement put a strain on their marriage and he moved out of their apartment to a friend's place to avoid her. It began affecting his performance during training, earning him severe reprimands from both Trevor and their platoon sergeant SFC Leon Wisniewski and the threat of an Article 15. He and Gloria file for divorce and Gloria returns to New York. In Season 7 they begin to reconcile.

=== Second Lieutenant Trevor LeBlanc ===
Seasons 1 – 6

Second Lieutenant Trevor LeBlanc (portrayed by Drew Fuller) is a former platoon leader in Bravo Company, 1st Brigade. When the show premiered he was a private first class and is promoted through the ranks to sergeant before attending OCS. At the start of Season 6 he is a second lieutenant and platoon leader. He served under COL Frank Sherwood when the latter was a company and later brigade commander and as an assistant to then-LTC Joan Burton for some time and is highly regarded by both of them. Frank later recommended him to OCS and Trevor, coincidentally, was once Jeremy's squad leader. During the latter part of Season 3 and the beginning of Season 4 he was a recruiter before receiving new orders to transfer back to frontline duty as a squad leader in preparation for the upcoming deployment to Afghanistan.

During the pilot episode Trevor proposes to Roxy after dating for less than a week. He legally adopts Roxy's sons Finn and TJ and treats them as his own children while the boys similarly took to him. He and Roxy later have twin boys. In Season 6 the family move to Tacoma, Washington when he is reassigned to the 2nd Ranger Battalion based at Fort Lewis.

=== Master Sergeant Chase Moran ===
Seasons 1 – 5 (main), 6 (guest)

Master Sergeant Chase Roderick Moran (portrayed by Jeremy Davidson) is the husband of Pamela Moran. When the show first started he was a staff sergeant in one of the resident airborne units at Fort Marshall and was selected for the 1st Special Forces Operational Detachment-Delta (better known as Delta Force) in the pilot episode. Coincidentally he was part of sniper team that rescued Dr. Roland Burton and Claudia Joy Holden from a deranged armed soldier suffering from PTSD in the Season 1 episode "One of Our Own" and also rescued then-Major General Michael Holden and several hostages from the Taliban in Afghanistan at the end of Season 4. In Season 3 he returns home early from a deployment and has difficulty readjusting to life at home. The unpredictability and secrecy of his deployments took a toll on the marriage. Although he dotes on Lucas and Katie and still loves Pamela, he began to grow emotionally distant from them due to his frequent absence. He and Pamela divorce during the time frame between Season 3 and 4. After returning from Afghanistan he sends in his application to be discharged. Both eventually realize that they still love each other deep down and reconcile and remarry in the episode "Strategic Alliances", much to their children's delight. After being discharged during the time frame between the conclusion of Season 5 and the beginning of Season 6 he takes up a management position in San Jose, California. Pamela and the children were to join him after finishing the school year but Pamela's apartment was condemned and possessions ruined by the hurricane, prompting them to move to California sooner than anticipated.

=== Specialist Tanya Gabriel ===
Seasons 4 – 5 (recurring), 6 (main)

Specialist Tanya Gabriel (portrayed by Erin Krakow) is a nurse at the base hospital and Jeremy Sherwood's fiancée. She had initially planned to go to medical school on an Army bursary and be commissioned as a medical officer. In the Season 4 episode "AWOL" she and Jeremy meet at the field hospital in Afghanistan when he brought in a buddy who dislocated a shoulder playing football during downtime. Jeremy proposes to her there with a makeshift ring made out of parachute cord. Tanya is "adopted" into "the tribe" who plan her bridal shower and help her through Jeremy's death. Frank and Denise Sherwood treated her like a surrogate daughter even after Jeremy's death. Devastated by Jeremy's death Tanya finally moves on with help and support from Denise. She starts a romance with (Major) Dr. Blake Hanson (portrayed by Jason Pendergraft) but they stop seeing each other for a while due to strict rules forbidding fraternization between officers and enlisted personnel. Dr. Hanson moved to Fort Lee in Virginia for the sake of their careers while Tanya remained at Fort Marshall as she had a few months left on her enlistment contract. In the episode "Hello, Stranger" she announces to the wives that her contract will be up in a week and she will be joining Dr. Hanson in Virginia once discharged.

=== Specialist Jeremy Sherwood ===
Seasons 1 – 5

Specialist Jeremy Sherwood (portrayed by Richard Bryant) was the son of Frank and Denise Sherwood. When the show first started he was seventeen and about to graduate from high school. He had difficulty dealing with his father's deployments and would take it out on his mother by physically hitting her. Frank had hoped he would take up the offer at West Point but Jeremy refused and it created tension between father and son. When Frank learned that Jeremy had been hitting Denise while he was away and even after Michael warned him, he angrily confronts Jeremy and throws him out of the house. At the end of Season 1 Jeremy decided not to go home and instead enlists out of guilt. Frank later makes the trip to Fort Benning to personally talk to him and they reconcile.

After completing his basic training, Jeremy is assigned to the 23rd Airborne Division. In the Season 2 episode "Safe Havens" he was deployed to Iraq. He befriends a dog who had saved him and his best friend PFC Mark Rison from an IED and calls him Lucky. With the help of a friend Lucky is smuggled back to Fort Marshall, much to LTC Joan Burton's bemusement, who has him sent to the pound; Lucky is later adopted by the LeBlancs. While in Iraq he nearly lost a buddy to a roadside bomb and witnessed PFC Rison's fatal shooting. He returned home suffering from post-traumatic stress disorder and survivor guilt, as he had switched places with PFC Rison just minutes before the shooting. After he took his father's gun and went on a rampage at home, he was admitted to the psychiatric ward at Mercer. Family friend Dr. Roland Burton took his case as a favor and helped him through his depression. Jeremy was cleared for duty and re-enlisted upon his promotion to Specialist.

In Season 4 he was redeployed, this time to Afghanistan, as a member of then-SGT Trevor LeBlanc's platoon. He met SPC Tanya Gabriel, a nurse/medic, at the aid station when he brought in SPC Giron who had dislocated a shoulder playing football during down time. Several weeks later he proposed to her after learning she would be returning to Fort Marshall earlier than expected and intended to marry her when he got back. He was killed in action, aged 21 on March 26, 2011, by a RPG during a gunfight outside Kandahar just weeks before the 23rd was due to return home. His father had been within the vicinity with headquarters company at that time and escorted his body home to Fort Marshall. Denise later meets his best friends PFC Riggs and SPC Giron, who hand her several photos of Jeremy they had taken in Afghanistan and personally thank her for sending Jeremy extra care packages to share with them.

=== Amanda Holden ===
Season 1

Amanda Joy Holden (portrayed by Kim Allen) was the older daughter of Michael and Claudia Joy Holden. The elder of two girls, she was born when her father was deployed in Kuwait during the Gulf War, suggesting that her birth date is between August and December 1990. She and her sister Emmalin are best friends with Jeremy Sherwood as their families have known each other for many years. She and Jeremy began a romantic relationship but it was frowned upon by their parents. In the Season 1 finale she was killed from The Hump Bar explosion. At the time of her death, she was due to begin college at the University of Virginia, majoring in political science.

=== Emmalin Holden ===
Season 1 (recurring), 2 – 6 (main), 7 (special guest)

Emmalin Jane Holden (portrayed by Caroline Pires in S1 and Katelyn Pippy from S2 onwards) is the younger daughter of Michael and Claudia Joy Holden and younger sister of Amanda. Her father was stationed at Fort Lewis at the time of her birth. She is affectionately known as "Emma" or "Kiddo" to her parents and within their circle of friends. In later seasons she often helped babysit the younger children.

When her sister Amanda died in season 1, Emmalin struggled to deal with her grief but hid it away from her parents. It came to a head at the end of Season 2 when she attempted to elope with PFC Logan Atwater (Paul Wesley), a young soldier in her father's division, in defiance of her father's move to Brussels, Belgium when he was assigned to NATO headquarters. She had a rebellious streak and a strained relationship with her father since then. After getting informal counseling from family friend Dr. Roland Burton she eventually works through her grief and anger. Father and daughter eventually repair their relationship in Season 3. In Season 5 she graduates from high school and leaves home for college.

After Claudia Joy's death, Emmalin considers dropping out of college for a year but Michael convinced her to stay in college because that's what Claudia Joy would have wanted.

=== David Burton ===
Seasons 5 – 6 (recurring), 7 (main)

David Burton (portrayed by McCarrie McCausland) is the adopted son of Roland and Joan Burton. He is aged 10–11 when he is adopted by the Burtons in Season 5 and they bring home in the episode "Drop Zone".

David was in foster care for some time as his biological father Marcus Williams was in and out of prison for various petty crimes and offenses. He is also HIV positive; his biological mother was a drug addict who passed the virus to him in utero. Due to the lack of a mother figure during much of his childhood, he had more difficulty warming up to Joan than to Roland or Sara Elizabeth but by the Season 5 finale he begins calling her "Mom".

During his first week at Fort Marshall he is introduced to the LeBlanc boys and Katie and Lucas Moran and befriends them. While he was almost immediately accepted by them and "the tribe", he had problems adjusting to his new school. His introverted personality led to him being targeted by playground bullies at school and although T.J. LeBlanc came to his defense, he was reluctant to tell anyone and tried to run away from home. He is ostracized by his classmates when it emerged that he was HIV positive. Charlie, the coordinator of the youth activities center on post, arranged a meeting with the other parents to explain his condition.

=== T. J. LeBlanc ===
Seasons 1 – 6

Tobias Jack "T.J." LeBlanc (portrayed by Luke Bartelme in S1-4 and Connor Christie in S5-6) is the oldest son of Trevor and Roxy LeBlanc and half-brother of Finn. His biological father Jesse was Roxy's high school sweetheart. At age seventeen they married after she learned she was pregnant with TJ and both dropped out of high school to work. She left Jesse when he became an abusive alcoholic and "punched [her] in the gut" when she was six months pregnant. According to Roxy, TJ never met his biological father and vice versa. Jesse refused to sign the adoption papers and came to The Hump Bar to see Roxy, futilely pleading with her for a second chance. Trevor later personally confronts him and pays him off for his signature; Jesse has not been seen since.

Trevor legally adopted both boys after marrying Roxy and they took his last name. When Roxy asked why, he stated that he himself was adopted and wanted them to know what it felt like to have a real father and a family who wanted them. Unlike Finn, T.J. takes longer to warm up to new people but he eventually warmed up to Trevor and called him "Dad" by the end of season 1. He looks up to Trevor and is often jealous of anything or anyone who gets in between. He and Finn quickly adjust to life on post and befriended Pamela's children Katie and Lucas. T.J. was mentioned to be aged 12 in season 5, meaning that he would have been around 6 or 7 when the show premiered.

In season 5 T.J., now a preteen, had more difficulty adjusting to his father's absence and began uncharacteristically acting up, disobeying Roxy and was also caught shoplifting from the PX by the MPs. After being harshly reprimanded by Trevor, who had called home from Afghanistan after hearing about the shoplifting incident, he began to settle down.

=== Finn LeBlanc ===
Seasons 1 – 6

Finn LeBlanc (portrayed by John White, Jr.) is second son of Trevor and Roxy LeBlanc. His biological father Whit was a childhood friend of Roxy's from Tuscaloosa but she also left him as she felt he was "never marriage material". She did not tell Finn that Whit was his biological father until season 5 when Finn overheard Trevor and Roxy discussing Whit. Roxy was raising Finn and his older half-brother T.J. by herself when she met (and eventually married) Trevor, who then legally adopted Finn and T.J. as his own.

A teacher discovered that Finn was not concentrating in school. He was subsequently tested and found to be an "exceptionally gifted" child. On the recommendation of his teacher, Roxy enrolled him at a prestigious private school on a full scholarship. They are best friends with Lucas and Katie Moran (Pamela and Chase's children) and David Burton (Roland and Joan's adopted son). In season 6 he took the news of his father's PCS to Fort Lewis badly as it meant that he would be missing his school science fair. Roxy was able to persuade him as she had found a school near their new post with a similar program.

Finn is the more cerebral of the brothers but enjoys playing sports with his father and brother. He warmed up to Trevor more quickly than T.J. and called him "Dad" almost immediately.

=== Lucas and Katie Moran ===
Seasons 1 – 6

Lucas (portrayed by Jake Johnson) and Katherine Eileen "Katie" (portrayed by Chloe J. Taylor) are the children of Chase and Pamela Moran. The children are close to their father and his frequent and often abrupt deployments frustrated them. They are best friends with the LeBlanc boys and often slept over at each other's houses.

== Recurring Characters ==
=== Officer Clayton Boone ===
Seasons 4 – 5

Officer Clayton Boone (portrayed by Lee Tergesen) is a colleague of Pamela Moran at the fictional Columbia County Metro Police. He was assigned as her Field Training Officer during her six-month probationary term and was also her evaluator. When they first started traffic patrol together, she was put off by his aloof and taciturn exterior but they become on friendly terms after some time. He was initially attracted to her but she rejected him when she realized that she was still in love with Chase despite being divorced.

=== Betty Camden ===
Seasons 1 – 2

Betty Camden (portrayed by Patricia French) was the former owner of The Hump Bar.

The Hump Bar was originally built by Dale D'Angelo and called Dale's Roadhouse during the 1940s. The main room frequently hosted USO concerts for troops stationed at Fort Marshall during World War II. During an era when the US Armed Forces still practiced segregation, it was the only bar in Charleston which did not adhere to segregation laws as Dale was a staunch believer in racial equality. He was stabbed to death defending a friend from a hooligan. Dale's widow Hazel sold the bar to a young couple, revealed to be Betty's parents. They renamed it "The Hump Bar" after The Hump, a landmark in Himalayas Allied pilots frequently flew over en route to China; Betty's father's cousin served as a pilot during the War. The bar remains popular with service personnel and their spouses.

Betty hired Roxy in Season 1 as the bar needed extra manpower. She becomes a motherly figure to Roxy, especially during Season 2 when Trevor was deployed. Roxy discovers that Betty has stage 1 breast cancer in the episode "Rules of Engagement". Before leaving for California she hands the deed to Roxy and makes her the next owner. In the Season 2 episode "Departures, Arrivals" Roxy receives a phone call informing her that Betty had died. She was often jokingly known as "Cranky Betty" to the other wives due to her self-deprecating and dry sense of humor.

=== Chief ===
Seasons 3 – 7

Chief (portrayed by Tim Parati) is head chef at The Hump Bar. He was brought in by Viola Crawford as part of her "shake up" of The Hump Bar and his trademark gumbo is especially popular with customers. His tall and gangling physique and trademark ponytail make him instantly recognizable to employees and customers. When Roxy was about to sell the bar, he threatened to quit as he felt the potential buyer was a "scumbag" for using frozen rather than fresh food.

=== Major General Kevin Clarke ===
Seasons 6 – 7

Major General Kevin Clarke (portrayed by Robert John Burke) is commander of 32nd Airborne Division and husband of Jackie Clarke. The 32nd was previously based at the fictional Fort Hope in North Carolina but a hurricane damaged much of the infrastructure and the division moved south to Fort Marshall, which suffered less damage. Known for his ruthless efficiency, his presence was met initially met with mixed reaction, particularly from COL Joan Burton. He was in contention with MG Michael Holden for a third star but political manipulation by Audrey Whitaker and the media attention on the Narubu incident damaged his chances and he lost out. Later in Season 6 he was seriously injured in a Humvee accident while deployed in Afghanistan. He returned to active duty after recovering.

Frank Sherwood previously served as his executive officer (XO) while both were stationed at Fort Lewis and their wives are good friends.

He and Jackie have two children: son Patrick, a recent West Point graduate, and daughter Sophie, who is a boarder at the prestigious Phillips Exeter Academy. The couple have been married for over twenty years. His workaholic nature took a toll on their marriage and, while he loves Jackie, they have had a love-hate relationship.

=== Lieutenant Colonel Evan Connor ===
Seasons 2 – 3

Lieutenant Colonel Evan Connor (portrayed by Matthew Glave) is an officer at garrison headquarters. He was introduced in Season 2 as then-LTC Joan Burton's maternity cover when she was deputy garrison commander. He transferred from Fort Bragg, having spent his career as a "pencil pusher" who has never seen combat. Much to Joan's ire, he often went behind her back and made decisions without consulting her while excusing himself with the fact that he was of equal rank with her and is therefore not obliged to follow her orders. Additionally he used Trevor LeBlanc several times to get back at Joan, knowing that Trevor, as a subordinate, was forced to obey his orders. In the Season 3 episode "Post and Prejudice" his lack of combat experience was exposed during the annual war games as his side lost heavily to Joan's despite his reliance on a "spy" to leak information. At division commander MG Michael Holden's request he was transferred to a desk job at The Pentagon.

=== Jennifer Connor ===
Seasons 2 – 3

Jennifer Connor (portrayed by Mayte Garcia) is the wife of LTC Evan Connor. Just like her husband, she is manipulative and has her own agenda, frequently doing things behind Claudia Joy Holden's back during FRG activities and doing things to sabotage Claudia Joy's credibility. In Season 2 she makes use of Claudia Joy's daughter Emmalin's infatuation with a soldier in hopes of driving a wedge between mother and daughter for her own gain.

=== Captain Nicole Galassini ===
Season 6

Captain Nicole Galassini (portrayed by Kellie Martin) is an Army intelligence officer assigned to the 32nd Airborne Division. She was assigned to COL Frank Sherwood's brigade as an intelligence analyst for the Narubu mission as her area of expertise was Africa and rescued 2LT Trevor LeBlanc's platoon from a potentially catastrophic hostage situation through negotiation. When the convoy was returning to base, her Humvee was ambushed and she was injured by a stray bullet. She was awarded the Bronze Star (with a "V" device) for her bravery.

Nicole is the lesbian partner of Charlie Mayfield but was reluctant to be forthcoming with the relationship due to the "don't ask, don't tell" policy. The Burtons and Sherwoods invite them over for dinner in an effort to make them feel more comfortable and accepted. Nicole eventually proposes to Charlie and agrees to stop hiding their relationship. It is revealed that Nicole's mother had difficulty accepting that her daughter was lesbian, hence Nicole's initial reluctance to make the relationship legal. She comes to Charleston for a visit and to attend Nicole's medal presentation ceremony but was unable to accept Charlie as her future "daughter-in-law". After much persuasion from Nicole, Mrs. Galassini agrees to attend the ceremony and she is seen at Nicole's Bronze Star presentation ceremony. In Season 6, Nicole and Charlie decide to adopt a child, after Charlie's multiple failed attempts to become pregnant.

=== Lenore Baker Ludwig ===
Seasons 1, 3, 4

Lenore "Lenny" Baker (later Ludwig) (portrayed by Rhoda Griffis) is the wife of General Ludwig. She was previously married to Brigadier General Theodore Baker, former garrison commander of Fort Marshall. She is an enigmatic figure to the other Army wives, especially Claudia Joy Holden, whose husband replaced BG Baker as garrison commander.

"The tribe" generally dislike Lenore's company due to her competitiveness and tactlessness and meddling in the other wives' affairs. For example, at a dinner party for senior officers the night after Jeremy attempted suicide, she intentionally brought up the subject, much to Frank and Denise's embarrassment. She often looks down on enlisted men's wives, mainly Roxy and Pamela, and would treat them in condescending manner in front of Claudia Joy, who was known for breaking tradition and befriending other army spouses regardless of their spouses' ranks or status. However, Lenore has confessed to Claudia Joy that she envies the fact that she is eloquent, educated and has a circle of close friends and a family man for a husband.

In Season 1 Lenore continuously spread rumors about the Holdens in hopes that her husband would be considered over Michael for a promotion. She used Marilyn Polarski to spread rumors about how Claudia Joy "killed someone" and got "kicked out of Harvard" (Claudia Joy had fallen asleep behind the wheel and knocked over a pedestrian but voluntarily withdrew from Harvard) and that Amanda was born out of wedlock and not Michael's legitimate child. Her husband suffered a brain aneurysm and she rejected Claudia Joy's sympathy, knowing that her husband would likely be forced to retire. When Lieutenant General Grayson was coincidentally visiting Fort Marshall to assess whether Michael should be permanently made garrison commander, Lenore attempted to win over his wife Victoria. Mrs Grayson used her own tactics against her by "accidentally" leaving a file of a highly classified project dating back to the Kosovo War, knowing that Lenore would look at it to gain the advantage. Lenore is arrested by MPs when she makes a reference to the project to LTG Grayson. In the episode "Rules of Engagement" Michael tells Claudia Joy that the Army CID decided dropped the case to avoid a public scandal and allow Baker to retire gracefully.

In the Season 3 finale, Lenore returned to Fort Marshall, having divorced BG Baker and remarried General Ludwig. She tells Claudia Joy and the other wives that she would be around for a month. It is revealed in the Season 4 opener that she had been nominated for the Muriel Spenser Award for the best military spouse, as was Claudia Joy, and was in town as Fort Marshall was hosting the ceremony. There are multiple events prior to the vote as the foundation members evaluate the candidates. Lenore takes every opportunity to undermine Claudia Joy. There is one final dinner before the vote where each nominee makes a 10-minute presentation. During the event, Lenore bad-mouths Claudia Joy, not knowing that her wireless microphone was still turned on. Pamela, who was working with the sound system, "accidentally" raised the volume loud enough for the public to hear. Claudia Joy was named the winner as a result.

=== Charlie Mayfield ===
Season 6

Charlotte "Charlie" Mayfield (portrayed by Ryan Michelle Bathe) is the lesbian partner of CPT Nicole Galassini. She runs the Youth Activities Center at Fort Marshall and befriends David Burton. When David was ostracized after his condition (HIV) was leaked out, she assisted the Burtons in dealing with the situation.

=== Marilyn Polarski ===
Seasons 1 – 2

Marilyn Polarski (portrayed by Kate Kneeland) was the wife of Sergeant George Polarski, an NCO in Trevor's unit. She was well known amongst the Army wives as the "Gossip Queen". However Roxy found out that Marilyn was having an affair with a civilian man named Eddie. Her husband eventually discovered and Marilyn angrily confronted Roxy, accusing of telling Trevor, who was acquainted with her husband, about the affair, which Roxy denied. Roxy mentioned that she slipped to Pamela and Marilyn confronted Pamela about it, which Pamela also vehemently denied. When Pamela angrily retorted to Marilyn to "do us all a favor and get a divorce", Marilyn confided to her that she was extremely unhappy with her marriage but lacked the courage or resources to get a divorce. Roxy considered telling Trevor but Pamela stopped her, stating that Army wives are bound by an unspoken code to protect one another. Pamela later discovered that she was a victim of spousal abuse and that she was petrified of her husband George. Marilyn tried to run away with Eddie in the Season 1 finale after George physically threatened her and was killed when her deranged husband walked into The Hump Bar with a bomb strapped to himself and detonated it.

=== Sergeant First Class Leon Wisniewski ===
Seasons 6 – 7

Sergeant First Class Leon "Ski" Wisniewski (portrayed by Adam Boyer) is 2LT Trevor LeBlanc's former platoon sergeant and right-hand man. He married as an eighteen-year-old "dumb ass Private" and divorced about eight months later. With his dry wit and experience, he helps Trevor, a former NCO himself, adapt to his new status as a commissioned officer. He is now happily married to Gisela, a German woman whom he met while stationed in Kaiserslautern, Germany.

== Minor characters ==
=== Marda Brooks ===
Seasons 1, 2, 6

Marda Brooks (portrayed by Gigi Rice) is the mother of Roxy LeBlanc. She makes her first appearance in the episode "Who We Are" when she unexpectedly drops by Fort Marshall late at night to visit. It becomes apparent that the relationship between mother and daughter is frosty and somewhat strained. Despite this it is apparent that she allowed Marda access to Finn and TJ as they call her "Grandma" and enjoy her presence. In Season 2 Trevor tries to mend the relationship between her and Roxy.

According to Roxy she once had her own hair saloon back in Tuscaloosa until she went bankrupt and also lost her house. She had Roxy at eighteen and her husband died five years later. Since then she has married twice and it is implied that both marriages ended in divorce. She was an alcoholic, although not abusive towards her daughter. Roxy is likely her only child as there are no references to any other children or siblings.

When she first visited Fort Marshall in season 1 she almost immediately "approved" of Trevor at their first meeting. Much to Roxy's dismay, Marda and Trevor were already on friendly terms by the end of her short stay. Trevor later revealed that he envied that she had a biological mother who at least cared for her in spite of everything while he did not even know who his biological mother was. At Trevor's insistence, Marda started attending AA meetings. In Season 6 it is revealed that she has successfully kicked her drinking habit and returned to working as a hair stylist. She stops by Fort Marshall to visit the family when the ship she works on docked at Charleston.

=== Viola Crawford ===
Season 3

Viola Crawford (portrayed by Tonya Pinkins) is a former employee and Roxy's assistant at The Hump Bar. They first met by chance in the episode "About Face" when Roxy stops a thief who had stolen and run off with Viola's purse. She is an astute businesswoman who once ran several successful F&B businesses until her son lost everything to a hedge fund. Having befriended Roxy, she offers some tips to help boost business at The Hump Bar. She suggests Roxy hire a manager but was met with resistance from Roxy, who distrusted anyone who dared threaten her position as sole manager after Collin, a conman claiming to be Betty's "nephew", attempted to scam her into selling him The Hump Bar at a cut-rate price. After seeing that Viola's new improvements were effective, Roxy apologizes and asks her to come back to help. They became good friends ever since. Viola stood in for the in-house band's soloist who had to back out for an emergency and was popular with customers. A club owner happened to be there and tried to talk Viola into joining his business but she repeatedly turned him down as she had grown fond of Roxy. Eventually Roxy found about it and told her to pursue her dreams, using the pretext of financial difficulties resulting from the ban on service personnel to "fire" her at the end of Season 3. Viola reluctantly accepts the club owner's invitation and leaves Charleston.

=== Marisol Evans ===
Season 4

Marisol Evans (portrayed by Gina Rodriguez) is the wife of Sergeant Pete Evans. Her husband was recently "PCS-ed" to Fort Marshall from Fort Riley several months ago and she works at the commissary to pass time. She is acquainted with the wives as she made the cake for Sara Elizabeth Burton's birthday and made a last-minute replacement when Roland accidentally dropped it on the floor. Denise, who was working as an EMT, got called to the Evans home and her colleague Choi noted that he has been called to their home before and the reason the husband always gave was "she slipped". Initially Marisol was resistant to Denise's efforts to help, partly due to the fact that Pete's superior back at Fort Riley failed to intervene after she asked for help and the abuse continued. With encouragement from Claudia Joy, Denise and Roxy and through Michael's intervention Pete was arrested and Marisol moved out to begin divorce proceedings.

=== Dr. Blake Hanson ===
Season 6

Dr. Blake Hanson (portrayed by Jason Pendergraft) is a doctor at Mercer Army Medical Center, the hospital serving Fort Marshall. He holds the rank of major and is an ER specialist. He was attracted to SPC Tanya Gabriel and Tanya reciprocated interest but they resisted pursuing a relationship due to strict rules forbidding fraternization between officers and enlisted personnel. They secretly dated for a while before Denise Sherwood, through Roxy, discovers the relationship. He decided to transfer to Fort Lee to avoid endangering their careers. Tanya stayed at Fort Marshall to see out the last few months of her enlistment contract. She joins him in Virginia after being discharged.

=== Corporal Ryan "Mac" McCallen ===
Seasons 2, 3

Corporal Ryan "Mac" McCallen (portrayed by David Call) is a soldier who lost both legs in Iraq. He was transferred to Mercer and befriends Denise, who was his attending nurse. While hospitalized, his girlfriend left him as she was not able to handle his "new body".

=== Min-Ji Webster ===
Season 6

Min-Ji Webster (portrayed by Hana Moon) is the wife of 1LT Danny Webster, a contemporary of 2LT Trevor LeBlanc and XO of Bravo Company. She met him when he was stationed in South Korea and followed him back to the United States after marrying him against her parents' wishes. She was the FRG group leader for Bravo Company but was ostracized by several of the wives or generally ignored as she was a foreigner and unfamiliar with American culture or social norms. When Roxy took over as the new leader, she tried to encourage Min-Ji to rejoin. It emerged that she and her husband were getting a divorce soon. In the Season 6 episode "Casualties" she commits suicide by carbon monoxide poisoning while her husband was hospitalized in Germany after being injured during the Africa mission.

=== Audrey Whitaker ===
Season 6

Audrey Whitaker (portrayed by Susan Lucci) is the wife of retired Major General Bryce Whitaker, former CO of Lieutenant General Michael Holden. She and her husband were family friends of the Holdens.

In the episode "General Complications", Jackie reveals to Claudia Joy that Audrey had a grudge against her husband for an incident which forced MG Whitaker into retirement but was kept under wraps. Six years ago, MG Kevin Clarke was with the 173rd Airborne Brigade based in Italy while MG Whitaker was attached to the V Corps, the 173rd's parent formation. MG Whitaker had invited his senior officers for a party and one of them raped the sixteen-year-old daughter of an Italian diplomat. The diplomat's wife personally called Jackie after the Army gave her "the run-around". MG Clarke took the matter to the Inspector General of the Italian Police and while the matter was eventually settled out of court, Whitaker was indirectly forced to retire to avoid the scandal being publicized and his reputation tarnished further. When the Clarkes and 32nd Airborne Division moved to Fort Marshall, Audrey took advantage of the upheaval to use her friendship with Claudia Joy Holden against Jackie. In the aftermath of the media spotlight on the Narubian orphans and attention focused on the Africa mission, Audrey claimed to have manipulated events which resulted in Kevin losing out to Michael for a promotion to lieutenant general. She then went to Claudia Joy demanding credit and an "advisory" position for her husband. Michael, who refuses to believe that Audrey played any part in his promotion, and Claudia Joy eventually decided to distance themselves from the Whitakers.
