= Army Wives =

American drama series

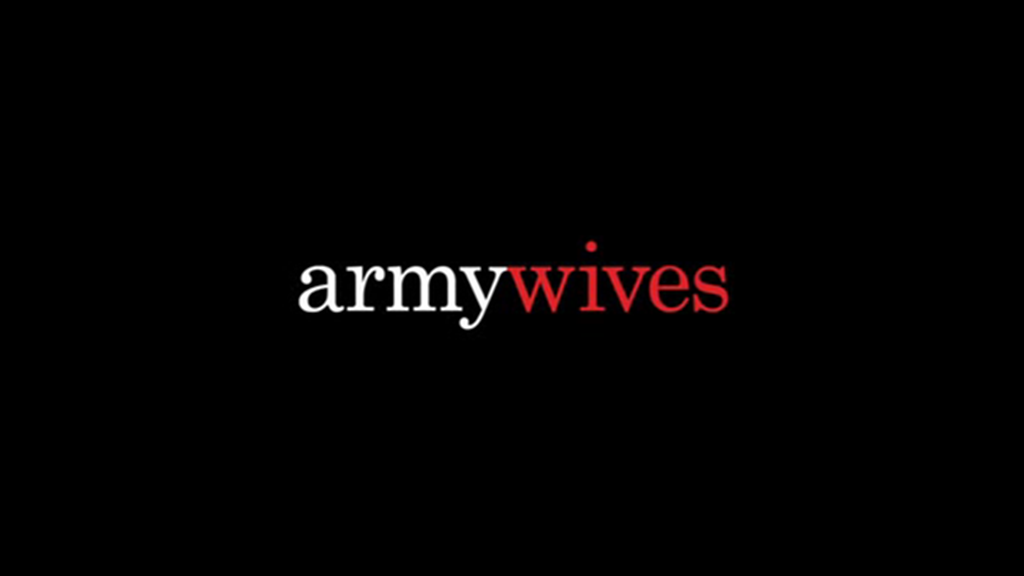
- Created by: Katherine Fugate
- Based on: Under the Sabers: The Unwritten Code of Army Wives by Tanya Biank
- Starring: Catherine Bell; Brigid Brannagh; Sterling K. Brown; Richard Bryant; Jeremy Davidson; Wendy Davis; Kim Delaney; Torrey DeVitto; Alyssa Diaz; Drew Fuller; Elle McLemore; Brian McNamara; Katelyn Pippy; Sally Pressman; Terry Serpico; Brooke Shields; Ashanti; Joseph Julian Soria; Kelli Williams; McCarrie McCausland
- Theme music composer: Marc Fantini; Steffan Fantini
- Composers: Scott Gordon; Marc Fantini; Steffan Fantini
- Country of origin: United States
- Original language: English
- No. of seasons: 7
- No. of episodes: 117 (list of episodes)

Production
- Executive producers: Mark Gordon; Marshall Persinger; Jeff Melvoin; Katherine Fugate; Dee Johnson; Harry V. Bring; Nick Thiel; Deborah Spera; Karen Maser; Debra Fordham
- Producers: Cynthia Cohen; Karen Maser; John E. Pogue; Alex Shevchenko; Barbara D'Alessandro; T.J. Brady; Rasheed Newson; John E. Pogue; Karen Maser
- Production location: Charleston, South Carolina
- Editors: Briana London; Susan K. Weiler; Sharon Silverman; Chris Peppe; Alan Cody; Kurt Courtland; Peter B. Ellis; Lauren A. Schaffer; Christopher Cooke; Susan Vaill; Meghan Robertson
- Running time: 60 minutes
- Production companies: ABC Studios; The Mark Gordon Company

Original release
- Network: Lifetime
- Release: June 3, 2007 – June 9, 2013

Army Wives is an American drama television series that follows the lives of four army wives, one army husband, and their families. The series premiered on Lifetime on June 3, 2007, and ran for seven seasons, ending on June 9, 2013. The show had the largest series premiere in Lifetime's 23-year history, and the largest viewership in the 10:00 pm to 11:00 pm time slot since December 2007 for Lifetime. It received favorable reviews and several award nominations, and won five ASCAP Awards and one Gracie Allen Award.

On September 21, 2012, the show was picked up for a thirteen-episode seventh season to air in 2013. In November 2012, it was confirmed that season 6 main cast members Catherine Bell, Wendy Davis, Terry Serpico, Brian McNamara, Kelli Williams, Alyssa Diaz, and Joseph Julian Soria would return as regulars. Kim Delaney's character, who did not appear in the final episodes of the sixth season, was written out. Season seven premiered in the United States on March 10, 2013, at 9 pm Eastern on Lifetime, and concluded on June 9, 2013.

On September 24, 2013, Lifetime canceled the series after seven seasons. The network confirmed a two-hour retrospective special with cast members to celebrate the series that aired on March 16, 2014.

== Overview ==
Based on the non-fiction book originally titled Under the Sabers: The Unwritten Code of Army Wives, by Tanya Biank, the series is set at fictional Fort Marshall, at the old Charleston Naval Base, in North Charleston, South Carolina, home to the also fictional 23rd Airborne Division, a component unit of the XVII Airborne Corps. The show itself is filmed in various locations such as the Charleston Air Force Base (now Charleston Field) and the sound stage off Dorchester Road in the City of North Charleston. Some scenes have been shot in and around the City of Charleston. In Season 5 the 23rd is disbanded and the 32nd Airborne Division becomes the new resident unit, having moved to Fort Marshall from the fictional Fort Hope. The 23rd Airborne Division, XVII Airborne Corps and Fort Marshall are presumably based on the actual 82nd Airborne Division, XVIII Airborne Corps based at Fort Bragg, home of the airborne divisions and the United States Army Special Operations Command. In Season 7 Fort Marshall was merged with an Air Force base, mirroring the mergers of several Army posts with nearby Air Force bases as a result of the 2005 Base Realignment and Closure Commission. Mercer Army Medical Center is the fictional hospital on post where some of the characters worked.

In the pilot episode of Army Wives, "A Tribe is Born", Roxy (Sally Pressman) accepts the marriage proposal of Private First Class Trevor LeBlanc (Drew Fuller) after dating for less than a week, and moves with her two children to his Army post in Ft. Marshall, South Carolina. Floundering in her new life as an Army wife, she takes a job as a bartender at a local joint known for being a Jody bar (where civilian men go to hit on enlisted men's wives) called the Hump Bar. While on the post, Roxy meets Claudia Joy Holden (Kim Delaney), who believes that her husband Col. Michael Holden (Brian McNamara) recently missed out on a promotion because of a rumor of base politics that the recent named General's wife started. Another Army wife, Pamela Moran (Brigid Brannagh), is pregnant with twins; she is secretly acting as a surrogate to get her family out of debt. Pamela's husband Chase (Jeremy Davidson) is a non-commissioned officer assigned to the highly secretive and frequently deployed Special Operations Unit Delta Force. Meanwhile, psychiatrist Roland Burton (Sterling K. Brown) is trying to reconnect with his wife, Lieutenant Colonel Joan Burton (Wendy Davis), who has just returned from Afghanistan from a 2-year deployment. Denise Sherwood (Catherine Bell), a long-time friend of Claudia Joy's, is dealing with her son Jeremy's anger issues and abusive behavior, and her strict husband, Major Frank Sherwood (Terry Serpico), is about to be deployed. The unlikely group bonds when Pamela unexpectedly goes into labor at Claudia Joy's house at the wives' tea party, and subsequently gives birth on a pool table at the Hump Bar where Roxy works. Not wanting everyone to know her family's dire financial situation, Pamela relies on these new friends to keep her surrogacy from being exposed.

As the first season progresses, the four women and Roland all become close friends. Along with their spouses and other characters, they face issues such as deployments, abuse, hostage situations, putting the bins out, adultery, sorting out the central heating timer, post-traumatic stress disorder PTSD, death and loss of friends and loved ones in combat, homophobia in the military, ironing, financial problems, and alcohol and prescription drug addiction.

Though the show is based on the book of the same name, and some of the characters echo their book counterparts, significant differences exist. For example, in the book, Andrea Lynn Cory (the basis of Claudia Joy) loses her husband in a helicopter crash during a mission to find the remains of soldiers in Vietnam.

== Cast and characters ==
=== Main cast and characters ===
Actor	Character	Seasons						
Actor	Character	1	2	3	4	5	6	7
Drew Fuller	2nd Lieutenant Trevor LeBlanc	Main	Main	Main	Main	Main	Main	
Jeremy Davidson	MSG Chase Moran	Main	Main	Main	Main	Main	Main	
Terry Serpico	Colonel Frank Sherwood	Recurring	Main	Main	Main	Main	Main	Main
Brian McNamara	Lt. General Michael James Holden	Main	Main	Main	Main	Main	Main	Main
Sterling K. Brown	Dr. Roland Burton	Main	Main	Main	Main	Main	Main	Recurring
Catherine Bell	Denise Sherwood	Main	Main	Main	Main	Main	Main	Main
Wendy Davis	Colonel Joan Burton	Main	Main	Main	Main	Main	Main	Main
Sally Pressman	Roxanne Marie "Roxy" LeBlanc	Main	Main	Main	Main	Main	Main	Special Guest
Brigid Brannagh	Officer Pamela Moran	Main	Main	Main	Main	Main	Main	Special Guest
Kim Delaney	Claudia Joy Holden	Main	Main	Main	Main	Main	Main	
Richard Bryant	SPC Jeremy Sherwood	Main	Main	Main	Main	Main		
Paul Wesley	PFC Logan Atwater		Main	Main				
Kim Allen	Amanda Joy Holden	Main	Guest					
Caroline Pires	Emmalin Holden	Main						
Katelyn Pippy	Emmalin Holden		Recurring	Main	Main	Main	Main	Special Guest
Erin Krakow	SPC Tanya Gabriel				Main	Main	Main	
McCarrie McCausland	David Burton					Recurring	Recurring	Main
Kelli Williams	Jackie Clarke						Main	Main
Alyssa Diaz	Gloria Cruz						Recurring	Main
Joseph Julian Soria	CPL Hector Crux						Recurring	Main
Jesse McCartney	Private Tim Truman							Main
Brant Daugherty	2nd Lt. Patrick Clarke							Main
Burgess Jenkins	Staff Sgt. Eddie Hall							Main
Torrey DeVitto	Maggie Hall							Main
Ashanti	Latasha Montclair							Main
Elle McLemore	Holly Truman							Main
Brooke Shields	Air Force Colonel Katherine "Kat" Young							Main

=== Recurring cast and characters ===
The characters listed have appeared in multiple seasons, or for story arcs lasting at least three episodes:

- John White, Jr. as Finn (Seasons 1–6)
- Luke Bartelme as TJ (Seasons 1–4)
- Jake Johnson as Lucas (Seasons 1–6)
- Chloe J. Taylor as Katie (Seasons 1–6)
- Richard Bryant as Jeremy Sherwood (Seasons 1-5)
- Gigi Rice as Marda Brooks (Seasons 1, 2, 4 & 6)
- Melissa Ponzio as Angie (Seasons 1-3)
- Rhoda Griffis as Lenore Baker Ludwig (Seasons 1, 4 & 6)
- Patricia French as Betty Camden (Seasons 1 & 2)
- Kate Kneeland as Marilyn Polarski (Season 1)
- Seamus Dever as Dr. Chris Ferlhingetti (Season 2)
- Kelly Collins Lintz as Carla Wright (Season 2)
- Matthew Glave as LTC Evan Connor (Seasons 2 & 3)
- Mayte Garcia as Jennifer Connor (Seasons 2 & 3)
- Gavin McCulley as Captain Thomas (Season 3)
- Sonequa Martin-Green as Kanessa Jones (Season 3)
- Linden Ashby as Dr. Dan Seaver (Seasons 3, 6 & 7)
- Matthew M. Anderson as Soldier (Season 3)
- Clifton Powell as Terrence Price (Seasons 3 & 4)
- Javier Carrasquillo as SPC Augusto Giron (Seasons 3–5)
- Jeff Rose as MAJ Bryce Ogden (Seasons 3–5)
- Tim Parati as Chief, cook at the Hump Bar (Season 3–7)
- Antjuan Tobias as PFC Guy Riggs (Seasons 4 & 5)
- Harry Hamlin as Grant Chandler (Seasons 4 & 5)
- Lee Tergesen as Officer Clayton Boone (Seasons 4 & 5)
- Cory Hart as Whit Carter (Season 5)
- Connor Christie as TJ (Seasons 5 & 6)
- Ryan Michelle Bathe as Charlie (Season 6)
- Harper and Ruby Powell Peterson as Molly (Seasons 6 & 7)
- Robert John Burke as General Kevin Clarke (Seasons 6 & 7)
- Adam Boyer as SFC Leon "Ski" Wisniewski (Seasons 6 & 7)
- Joy Wren and Faith Wren as Sara Elizabeth Burton (Seasons 6 & 7)
- Kellie Martin as Army Intelligence Captain Nicole Galassini (Season 6)
- Susan Lucci as Audrey Whitaker (Season 6)
- Jason Pendergraft as Dr. Blake Hanson (Season 6)
- Larry Gilliard, Jr. as Marcus Williams (Season 6)
- Jordan Woods-Robinson as Scott Keller (Season 3)
- Viki Jeffords as Candace Tyler (Seasons 1, 6 & 7)
- Skyler Day as Sophie Clarke (Season 6)
- Chloe Lanier as Penny Campbell (Seasons 6 & 7)
- Joshua Henry as Corporal Quincy Montclair (Season 7)
- Ella Wahlestedt as Caroline Hall (Season 7)
- Caleb Barwick as Tanner (Season 7)
- Niles Fitch as Deuce Montclair (Season 7)
- Kaci Walfall as Nyah (Season 7)
- Tre Jamison as Gabe (Season 7)

== Production and development ==
=== Conception ===
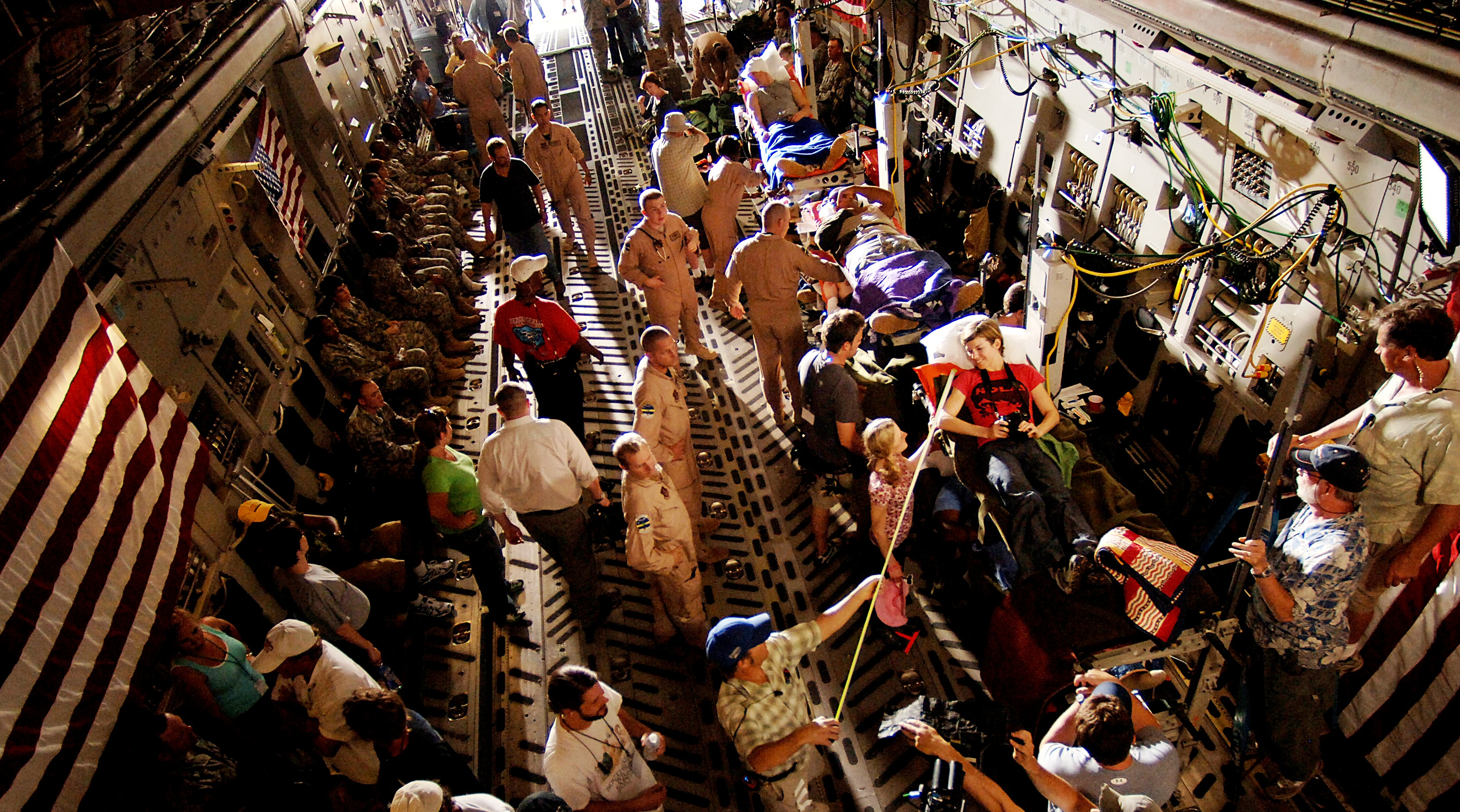
Army Wives filming at the Charleston Air Force Base, South Carolina.

Army Wives was created by Katherine Fugate, based on the book Under the Saber: The Unwritten Code of Army Wives by Tanya Biank. Fugate told she received the book from The Mark Gordon Company and first thought it was to be adapted as a movie, since she had mostly written movies during her career. She met with Deborah Spera, the president of The Mark Gordon Company, and pitched a film adaptation of the book, which would begin and end with a murder. They presented the series to ABC and then to Lifetime. Fugate commented on the book: "I read that book, and it was very traumatic and very difficult, but it also opened the gates of a military post. We drive by them all the time, but we don't know what goes on inside".

Fugate expressed her desire that the show remain accurate: "It's extremely important that I portray them accurately. I have great admiration for the wives. It's the last untold story, about how they maintain relationships and how they are single mothers much of the time. That story is why I created the series." The cast and crew have visited the army installations at Fort Bragg and Fort Belvoir and talked to army wives. The Department of Defense lent Black Hawk helicopters and humvees used in production.

=== Filming locations ===
Principal photography takes place in a sound stage, while some outdoor scenes and shots are taken at the former Charleston Naval Shipyard, parts of Charleston Field and in the city itself. Local landmarks prominently featured include the Unitarian Church in Charleston and parts of the city's waterfront.

=== Production team ===
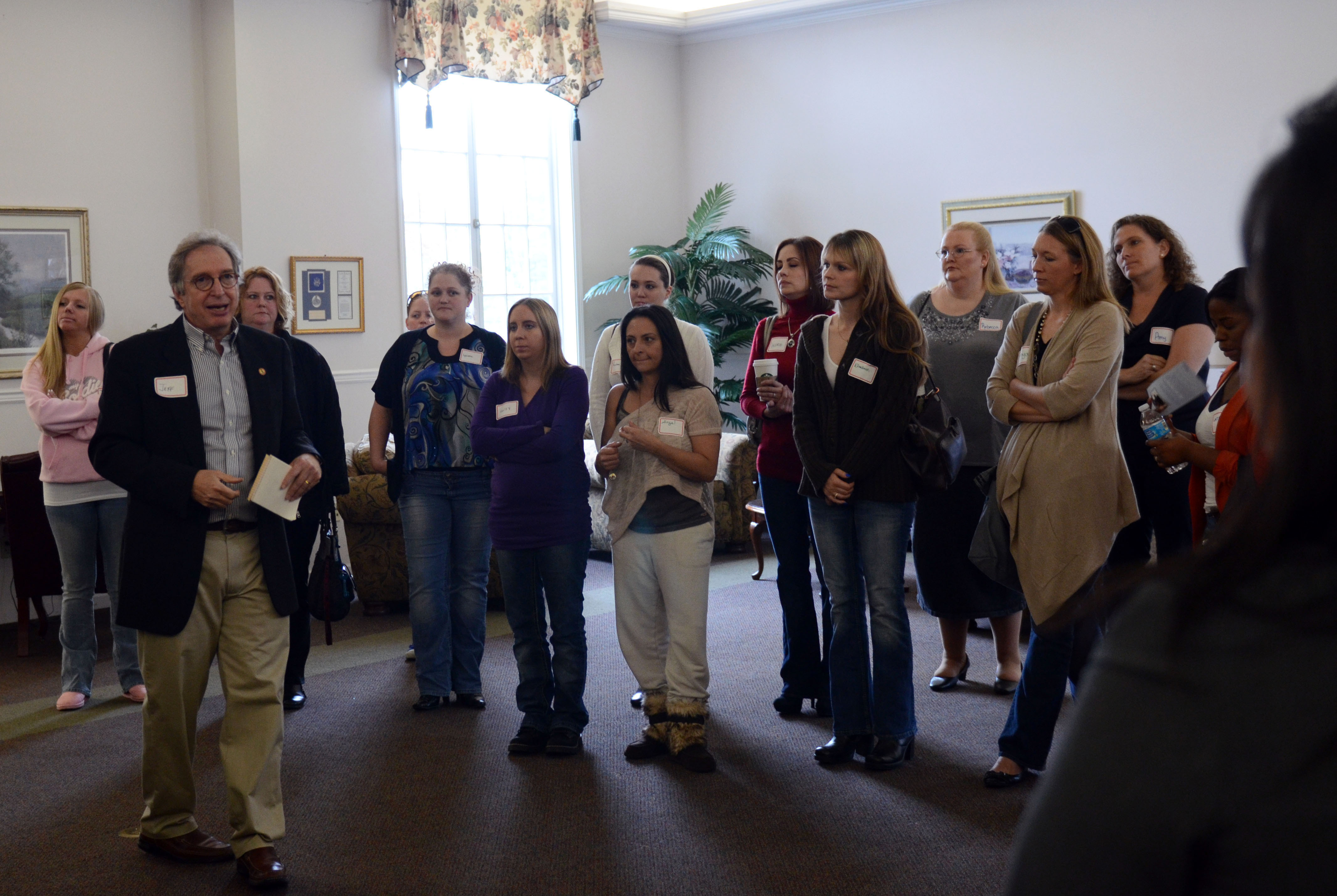
Executive producer Jeff Melvoin speaking to Joint Base Lewis-McChord Army spouses in 2012.

Army Wives was produced by The Mark Gordon Company in association with ABC Studios. In December 2006, Samantha Corbin-Miller was named executive producer/showrunner of the show, which was at the time in development. However, by March 2007, it was announced that she had left the then upcoming series and was replaced by Jeff Melvoin. In August 2007, Dee Johnson took over Army Wives for Melvoin, becoming the third showrunner. She departed in March 2008, and Nick Thiel came aboard. In August 2008, the series' creator Katherine Fugate also left, stating: "With the show [being] such an established hit, now seems like a logical time for me to step away and focus on developing new projects." Melvoin returned in 2009 and was the showrunner from then.

Each script was supervised by two advisers from the Army. Additionally Tanya Biank, whose book inspired the series, served as a military consultant on every episode. Lt. Colonel Todd Breassealle was also enlisted to provide insight on the military life. Cast member Brian McNamara (Michael Holden) directed several webisodes and two full episodes: the tenth episode of the fifth season and the eleventh episode of the sixth season.

=== Spin-off pilot ===
In September 2009, a survey to see which character should get its own spin-off was posted on Lifetime's Army Wives blog; Pamela Moran (Brigid Brannagh) was one of the most-chosen characters. On June 13, 2010, Deadline Hollywood reported that Lifetime was pursuing a spin-off procedural drama television series for Army Wives featuring Brannagh's character, police officer Pamela Moran. It was reported that an episode of the fourth season would serve as a backdoor pilot for the proposed spin-off. The seventeenth episode of the season, titled "Murder in Charleston", served as the backdoor pilot, airing on August 15, 2010. Written by Bruce Zimmerman and T.D. Mitchell, the episode sees Moran teaming up with detective Gina Holt (Gabrielle Union) on a murder related to a case Holt has been working on for the past three years in Atlanta. At the end of the episode, Holt tells Moran she should take a detective's exam and to look for her if she is in Atlanta. In September 2010, however, Lifetime did not pick up the spin-off series.

== Reception ==
=== Critical response ===
Army Wives holds a score of 65 out of 100 on Metacritic, based on fifteen reviews for the first season. Writing for CinemaBlend, Kelly West found the series positively portrays real army wives through its main characters who are "all strong women with a good sense of the importance of friendship, love and appreciating the time they have with their husbands, who are often being deployed overseas for months or longer." She described the series as "engaging", adding: "As a drama about the bonds of friendship and the importance of family, Army Wives works. Is it a total chick show? Yeah, I’d say so. It gets a bit soapy but overall, it’s well written, the premise is original and the acting is good." New York Post's columnist Linda Stasi gave Army Wives three-and-a-half out of four stars, referring to it as a "sexy, smart, compelling series", and also lauded the acting and the writing. The Chicago Tribune praised Lifetime for tackling, through Army Wives, the effects war has on the families "in a surprisingly straightforward manner." Reviewing the premiere, Michelle Hewitson of the New Zealand Herald wrote: "Anything with 'wives' in the title must mean cat fights. Anything with 'Army' in the title must mean some musing on the cost of war." Brian Lowry of Variety was less enthusiastic upon screening the first episodes, describing Army Wives as "a stereotypical sudser that wants to be From Here to Eternity but feels like All My Children: Military Edition." Pittsburgh Post-Gazette's Rob Owen was negative about the show's storylines as they "leave talented actors in their wake"; he described the storylines as "uninspired" and "unimaginative" and wrote that the show's format evokes the home-front portion of The Unit.

The Chicago Tribune called Catherine Bell who "uses her typical subtlety and grace to give an intriguing interior life to Denise Sherwood," and Kim Delaney who portrays Claudia Joy Holden "the best two things about the show" while the newspaper deemed Roxy (Sally Pressman) "the most problematic character" because she does "preposterous and downright stupid things" in the first episodes. On the contrary, Rob Owen found Denise Sherwood and Claudia Joy Holden "the most passive, least interesting characters" and considered Roxy and Trevor (Drew Fuller) "the liveliest couple", adding the show "sparks to life anytime these two are on screen." Michelle Hewitson of the New Zealand Herald described Roxy as "a slapper with a heart of gold". Linda Stasi called Frank Sherwood, portrayed by Terry Serpico, a "rivetingly wonderful character."

The second season received promotion from Barack Obama and John McCain who were running for President in 2008.

=== Ratings ===
The series opened its third season with 3.5 million viewers and a 2.4 rating among women 18-49, and a 1.0 rating among men 18-49. That made Wives the top-rated drama premiere in Lifetime's key demographic for 2009, though the show declined 22% among total viewers later in the year.

The series opened its fifth season with a total of 4.2 million viewers, up 27% from the fourth-season premiere, and it scored a 1.4 rating among women 18-49. The episode is Lifetime’s second most watched original season premiere among the key demos, including Women 18+ (3.0 rating) and Adults 18+ (4.0 rating), behind only the season two debut of Army Wives.

=== Awards and accolades ===
Awards and accolades for Army Wives
Year	Award	Category	Recipients	Result	Ref.
2008	ASCAP Awards	Top Television Series	Marc Fantini, Steffan Fantini, Scott Gordon	Won	
2008	Gracie Allen Awards	Outstanding Drama		Won	
2008	NAACP Image Awards	Outstanding Actress in a Drama Series	Wendy Davis	Nominated	
2008	PRISM Awards	Mental Health Depiction Award		Nominated	
2008	PRISM Awards	Performance in a Drama Series Multi-Episode Storyline	Wendy Davis	Nominated	
2009	ASCAP Awards	Top Television Series	Marc Fantini, Steffan Fantini, Scott Gordon	Won	
2009	NAACP Image Awards	Outstanding Actress in a Drama Series	Wendy Davis	Nominated	
2010	ASCAP Awards	Top Television Series	Marc Fantini, Steffan Fantini, Scott Gordon	Won	
2011	ASCAP Awards	Top Television Series	Marc Fantini, Steffan Fantini, Scott Gordon	Won	
2011	NAACP Image Awards	Outstanding Actress in a Drama Series	Wendy Davis	Nominated	
2012	ASCAP Awards	Top Television Series	Marc Fantini, Steffan Fantini, Scott Gordon	Won	
2012	NAMIC Vision Awards	Best Drama		Nominated	
2013	Young Artist Awards	Best Performance in a TV Series - Guest Starring Young Actress 11-13	Annika Horne	Won	
2013	Young Artist Awards	Best Performance in a TV Series - Guest Starring Young Actress 11-13	Taylor Blackwell	Nominated	
2014	Young Artist Awards	Best Performance in a TV Series - Supporting Young Actor	McCarrie McCausland	Nominated	

== Home media ==
Walt Disney Studios Home Entertainment has released all seven seasons on DVD.

Army Wives - The Complete First Season
Set details		Special features	
13 episodes; 3-disc set; 522 minutes; 1.78:1 aspect ratio; English (Dolby Surround 5.1); Subtitles:English, French, Spanish		"Have at It" With the Army Wives - A Q&A session with the cast; Wives On the Homefront; Deleted Story Line (with producer commentary); Bloopers; Audio commentaries; Deleted scenes	
Release dates
(United States) USA	Canada	(United Kingdom) UK	Australia
June 10, 2008		N/A	November 11, 2008

Army Wives - The Complete Second Season
Set details		Special features	
19 episodes; 5-disc set; 804 minutes; 1.78:1 aspect ratio; English (Dolby Surround 5.1); Subtitles:English, French, Spanish		Active Duty: The Cast Of Army Wives At Fort Bragg; Operational intelligence: Getting the Army's support; The tribe; Army Wives Gives Back; Deleted scenes; Bloopers	
Release dates
(United States) USA	Canada	(United Kingdom) UK	Australia
June 2, 2009		N/A	N/A

Army Wives - The Complete Third Season
Set details		Special features	
18 episodes; 5-disc set; 759 minutes; 1.78:1 aspect ratio; English (Dolby Digital 5.1); Subtitles:English		Webisodes - Featuring Joan and Roland Burton and Jeremy Sherwood; Stationed in the South - Behind the scenes visit with the cast and crew; Army Wives Gives Back; Deleted scenes; Bloopers	
Release dates
(United States) USA	Canada	(United Kingdom) UK	Australia
February 9, 2010		N/A	N/A

Army Wives - The Complete Fourth Season
Set details		Special features	
18 episodes; 4-disc set; 765 minutes; 1.78:1 aspect ratio; English (Dolby Digital 5.1); Subtitles:English, French, Spanish		Safety first; Army wives get cooking; Military jargon; Deleted scenes; Bloopers	
Release dates
(United States) USA	Canada	(United Kingdom) UK	Australia
December 14, 2010		N/A	N/A

Army Wives - The Complete Fifth Season
Set details		Special features	
13 episodes; 3-disc set; 551 minutes; 1.78:1 aspect ratio; English (Dolby Digital 5.1); Subtitles:English, French, Spanish		Hangin' At The Hump With the Cast; A heartfelt conversation reflecting back on the past five seasons; Deleted scenes; Fun On Set: Bloopers, Babies, Ballroom And Brian McNamara	
Release dates
(United States) USA	Canada	(United Kingdom) UK	Australia
September 27, 2011		N/A	N/A

Army Wives - The Complete Sixth Season
Set details		Special features	
23 episodes; 7-disc set; 854 minutes; 1.78:1 aspect ratio; English (Dolby Digital 5.1); Subtitles:English		Deleted scenes; Bloopers	
Release dates
(United States) USA	Canada	(United Kingdom) UK	Australia
September 18, 2012 (part one); December 18, 2012 (part two)		N/A	N/A

Army Wives - The Complete Seventh Season
Set details		Special features	
13 episodes; 3-disc set; 559 minutes; 1.78:1 aspect ratio; English (Dolby Digital 5.1); Subtitles:English, French, Spanish		Deleted scenes; Bloopers	
Release dates
(United States) USA	Canada	(United Kingdom) UK	Australia
September 10, 2013		N/A	N/A

== International airings ==
The series began airing in Ireland on Monday, October 15, 2007, on TG4 (in English) and in New Zealand on Thursday, June 19, 2008, on TV2. The series began airing in Australia on December 1, 2008, on Network Ten and currently on pay TV provider Foxtel. South African network M-Net also airs the series; the second season ended on M-Net on Monday, January 5, 2009. Sky Living in the United Kingdom broadcast the first three seasons. However, in February 2012, it was announced that the channel had not purchased the rights for the fourth season.

The series was broadcast in Italy on November 1, 2007 on Fox Life and Rai 2. The series also airs in Israel in the winter of 2008 on Yes stars Drama. The series began airing in the Netherlands in 2008 on NET 5, while the second season aired starting April 26, 2010. In the French-speaking part of Belgium, Wallonia, the first season began airing on RTL-TVI on August 3, 2008 whereas the second season was shown on cable television network BeTV starting from December 26, 2008. In France, the show retitled American Wives was first broadcast on Monégasque channel TMC on November 27, 2008. Sister channel TF1 started airing the first season on August 13, 2012.

In the French-speaking parts of Canada, Historia started airing the first season on January 4, 2010. The series was then brought to an associated channel, Series+, and which started airing from season 1 again on November 4, 2010, on a daily basis. The first season and the first 13 episodes of the second were aired in the Arab World on MBC 4 while the third season began on Tuesday, May 11, 2010, on Fox Series. The series began airing in Russia on FOX Life, in Sweden the series is aired on Sjuan and was also broadcast on RTL Television in Croatia.
