= Tanya Biank =

American journalist, author, and speaker

- Education: Pennsylvania State University
- Occupations: Journalist, author, and speaker
- Spouse: COL Michael A. Marti
- Writing career
- Subject: Military
- Website: tanyabiank.com

Tanya Biank is an American journalist, author, and speaker. She has written two books, one of which was the inspiration for the television show, Army Wives.

== Early life and education ==
Biank comes from a family of combat veterans and active-duty service members. Her father was in the United States Army, retiring as a colonel. He served for 33 years. Her sister, Brigadier General Maria Biank, was deployed to Iraq in 2009, the same time as Tanya Biank's husband.

Biank graduated from Herndon High School in 1989. She attended Pennsylvania State University, where she received her bachelor's degree in journalism. She graduated in 1993. After college, Biank lived in Korea for one year. She studied language and culture, while also teaching English as a second language at an all-girls school. Besides Korea, Biank has lived in a variety of places including, Germany, Fort Knox in Kentucky, Buffalo, New York, Northern Virginia, and Georgia. Biank is a Fulbright Scholar.

== Career ==
Biank was a newspaper reporter and traveled around the world with the troops. She was a former news reporter for the Fayetteville Observer. Her coverage of the 2002 murders involving military wives whose husbands were stationed at Fort Bragg led to Congressional inquiries and changes in Army policies. She is a syndicated columnist and contributing writer to various military-related publications: Operation Homefront, Military Spouse Magazine, and Military Officer Magazine. Her work has also appeared in The New York Times and The Wall Street Journal. Biank has been a guest on numerous television and radio outlets including, Good Morning, America, CNN, Fox News, MSNBC, ABC News, and NPR.

Biank has written two books. Her first, Army Wives: The Unwritten Code of Military Marriage (2006), was originally titled, Under the Sabers: The Unwritten Code of Army Wives. It inspired the Lifetime television series Army Wives, for which Biank served as a consultant. She also wrote the book, Undaunted: The Real Story of America's Servicewomen in Today's Military (2013). Biank's story, "Having it All," was published in Stories Around the Table: Laughter, Wisdom, and Strength in Military Life. She has said that her work is not about her own family, but is inspired by her personal experiences.

Beyond writing, Biank served as a leader of a Family Readiness Group during her husband's 2009-2010 deployment to Iraq. This organization was formed to help families face the difficult challenges of military life. She is also a member of the Society of Daughters of the U.S. Army.

== Personal life ==
Biank is married to Colonel Michael A. Marti. They have two children.
