= Richard Bryant (actor) =

American actor (born 1984)

Richard Bryant (born September 22, 1984, in Stockton, California) is an American actor who has appeared in the Lifetime Television series Army Wives. He played Jeremy Sherwood.

Richard moved to Charleston, SC in 1986. He attended Trident Technical College in Charleston, South Carolina. He graduated high school in 2002 from the Charleston County School of the Arts, where he was a theatre major. Richard is currently enrolled at the College of Charleston.

He also appeared on The WB/The CW Television Network show One Tree Hill.

Bryant is able to play guitar, bass guitar, banjo, drums, cello, and piano. He can speak some French and Spanish.
