= List of Army Wives episodes =

Army Wives is an American television drama series that premiered on Lifetime on June 3, 2007. Based on the book by Tanya Biank, the series follows the lives of four army wives, one army husband, and their families.

During the course of the series, 117 episodes of Army Wives aired over seven seasons, between June 3, 2007, and June 9, 2013. The series was canceled on September 24, 2013. A two-hour retrospective special, titled Army Wives: A Final Salute, aired on March 16, 2014.

== Series overview ==
Season	Episodes	Originally released	
Season	Episodes	First released	Last released
1	13	June 3, 2007	August 26, 2007
2	19	June 8, 2008	November 2, 2008
3	18	June 7, 2009	October 11, 2009
4	18	April 11, 2010	August 22, 2010
5	13	March 6, 2011	June 12, 2011
6	23	March 4, 2012	September 9, 2012
7	13	March 10, 2013	June 9, 2013

== Episodes ==
=== Season 1 (2007) ===
No. overall	No. in series	Title	Directed by	Written by	Original release date	US viewers (millions)
1	1	"A Tribe is Born"	Ben Younger	Katherine Fugate	June 3, 2007	3.47
After only a four-day courtship, Roxy impetuously decides to marry PFC Trevor LeBlanc and moves with her two kids to his Army post. Floundering in her new life as an Army wife, she takes a job bartending at a local joint known for being a Jody bar (where civilian men go to hit on enlisted men's wives). While on the post, Roxy meets Claudia Joy Holden, who believes that her husband Col. Michael Holden's promotion didn't come through because of base politics. Another Army wife, Pamela Moran, is heavily pregnant with twins - she's secretly acting as a surrogate to get her family out of debt. Meanwhile, psychiatrist Roland Burton is trying to reconnect with his wife, Lt. Col. Joan Burton, who has just returned from Afghanistan. Then there's Denise Sherwood, who is dealing with her son Jeremy's anger-management issues as her strict husband, Maj. Frank Sherwood, is about to be deployed. The unlikely group bonds when Pamela unexpectedly goes into labor at Claudia Joy's wives' tea party. Not wanting everyone to know her family's dire financial situation, Pamela keeps it secret.
2	2	"After Birth"	Perry Lang	Katherine Fugate	June 10, 2007	3.27
When she arrives at the hospital, Pamela learns that the couple who paid her to be a surrogate are out of town and can't pick up the twins right away; Claudia Joy offers to house the newborns to protect Pamela's secret. Meanwhile, Trevor's upcoming deployment to Iraq prompts him to make a surprise offer to adopt Roxy's kids. On another front, Denise's abusive son, Jeremy, is still out of control, and she needs help protecting herself. Roxy comes to the rescue. Attempting to rekindle the romance with Joan, Roland plans an intimate dinner, but it's ruined by her heavy drinking and harsh accusations. Pamela leans on her husband for comfort when she says goodbye to the babies she carried.
3	3	"The Art of Separation"	Patrick Norris	Katherine Fugate	June 17, 2007	3.84
Claudia Joy's daughter Amanda gets arrested at a war protest. And Claudia Joy isn't the only mom with problems: Denise has a showdown with Jeremy and lies about his West Point plans to her husband. Joan checks in on one of her men who's suffering from post-traumatic stress disorder and Roland hears about a soldier having recurring nightmares about his commanding officer, which turns out to be Joan. Pamela and Chase try to reconnect, but the surrogacy continues to cause challenges. Meanwhile, Roxy's ex wreaks havoc for Trevor's plans to adopt T.J., but a happy ending is in sight. At a get-together at Claudia Joy's, the group learns that Denise's husband's helicopter crashed in Iraq. No one knows if he survived.
4	4	"One of Our Own"	Michael Lange	Rama Stagner	June 24, 2007	3.89
In shock over her husband's copter crash, Denise desperately wants to go to Frank, and only Claudia Joy can persuade her that it's best to stay home. Unfortunately, the trauma strains Denise's relationship with Jeremy even more. Roxy signs the adoption papers, officially marking Trevor the adoptive father of her children. Meanwhile, a mentally unstable soldier takes Roland and Claudia Joy hostage at the hospital and demands to speak to his superior officer: Joan, whose darkest secrets about her tour in Afghanistan are exposed to her husband.
5	5	"Independence Day"	John T. Kretchmer	Hilly Hicks, Jr.	July 1, 2007	3.78
Roxy learns that Marilyn, Fort Marshall's biggest gossip, is having an affair, but promises to keep Marilyn's secret. At Claudia Joy's annual Independence Day picnic, Pamela is devastated when Chase is suddenly called away on a Delta Force mission. Roland champions Joan by asking Colonel Holden to consider her 20 years of service, but Joan is torn between retiring from the Army or facing a possible court-martial.
6	6	"Who We Are"	Allison Liddi-Brown	Dee Johnson	July 8, 2007	4.41
Denise gets a welcome surprise. Claudia Joy and Michael become concerned when they learn of their daughter Amanda's relationship with Jeremy. While playing with the boys, Trevor injures himself which puts his deployment on hold. Roxy's mother Marda pays the family an unexpected visit.
7	7	"Hail & Farewell"	Kevin Dowling	Rama Stagner	July 15, 2007	3.70
After a childhood filled with broken promises, Roxy has a hard time trusting that her mother, Marda, is sober. To surprise her daughter, Marda enlists Pamela to help plan a birthday party for Roxy. Jeremy decides to enlist in the Army and seeks comfort from Amanda. However, Michael and Claudia Joy try to defuse the romance between them by revealing details of Jeremy's past behavior to Amanda. Meanwhile, Denise is distraught about Jeremy's decision to enlist.
8	8	"Only the Lonely"	Rob Spera	Amanda Lasher	July 22, 2007	3.52
Infatuated with Jeremy, Amanda is upset when her parents, Michael and Claudia Joy, tell her they want her to go on a family vacation to Montana. Frustrated, Amanda reaches out to Denise, Jeremy's mother, for comfort. After 18 years out of the work force, Denise decides to pursue nursing at the post hospital. While Chase is deployed, Pamela has an unexpected reunion with Scott, a friend from her past. Roland finds himself in bed with a reporter who is only in town for 48 hours. And Roxy befriends a recently widowed single mother, Delores, who cannot accept that she needs to leave the post as a result of her husband's death.
9	9	"Nobody's Perfect"	Patrick Norris	Dee Johnson	July 29, 2007	3.65
Joan returns to the army base and surprises Roland with her newfound attitude. Roland begins to remorse over his affair with the magazine reporter. Denise argues with Frank over her returning to nursing school. Frank wants Denise to be a stay at home wife, while Denise thinks otherwise. Eventually, Denise misses Major Weatherford's party much to Frank's dismay. While at Major Weatherford's party, Claudia Joy overhears Lenore Baker and her husband having a dispute about their marriage. When Lenore realizes that Claudia Joy has overheard her dispute with her husband, she begins to start rumors about Claudia Joy. Determined to yank Denise back home, Frank has an epiphany instead when he watches her save an injured soldier's life and tells her it reminded him of why he fell in love with her in the first place.
10	10	"Dirty Laundry"	Joanna Kerns	Julie Rottenberg & Elisa Zuritsky	August 5, 2007	3.71
Claudia Joy's old friend, Hannah White, returns to the post to attend a memorial for fallen soldiers and her husband is one of the soldiers being honored. Controversy begins to ensue when Hannah White finds out that her husband was killed by friendly fire and in a different country than first told. Hannah White decides to take the case to the U.S. Supreme Court which causes trouble for Claudia Joy and Michael. Michael decides that Hannah must leave their house since he is now Commander of the post, since General Baker is in the hospital, and it does not look well to have someone who is against the army staying with the Commander of a post. The case also starts problems with the other army wives. Pamela and Denise disagree with what Hannah is doing, and when Roxy tries to stop them from arguing, Pamela makes Roxy take a side.
11	11	"Truth and Consequences"	Perry Lang	Bruce Zimmerman	August 12, 2007	3.74
General Grayson and his wife visit the post and Lenore takes the chance to sabotage Claudia Joy even more. The rumors get so bad that Amanda has to even ask Claudia Joy if Michael is her real father. Claudia Joy becomes angry that someone would attack her daughter, but Michael suggest that Claudia Joy not do anything that would compromise their reputations. Eventually, Lenore gets what she deserves while trying to harm Claudia Joy again. Frank finds out that he is being deployed, so Denise tries to convince him to visit Jeremy and not leave things the way they are. Frank eventually visits Jeremy, though Frank does not completely forgive Jeremy, he makes an effort to mend things with his son. Pamela gets offered a job at the post radio station. At first, she rejects the offer, but then decides to do the radio show so that she can express herself and so that other army wives can have someone to talk to. Roland admits to Joan that he had an affair while she was getting treatment. Joan, at first, is upset, but decides she wants to work on her marriage. Roland, on the other hand, says that he isn't happy in their marriage and ends up sleeping at a hotel instead of at home.
12	12	"Rules of Engagement"	Glenn Kershaw	Jeff Melvoin & Michael Oates Palmer	August 19, 2007	3.81
When Roxy gets assaulted by a drunk at the Hump Bar Roland defends her, causing a fight and ends up in jail. Joan bails him out, but he still refuses to return home and work on their marriage together. Eventually, Joan tells Roland that this seems to be a divorce and Roland begins to seek a job in Chicago. During the fight Roxy gets hit in the eye, which makes Trevor worried and he asks her to find another job. Roxy wants to open up her own bar, but Trevor explains to her that as an army wife you never stay in one base for more than 2–3 years. This causes trouble between Trevor and Roxy. Chase returns and Pamela is more than excited. Roland surprises Hump Bar owner Betty. When Pamela goes on the radio and says how she and her husband consummated his return, Chase gets angry saying Pamela embarrassed him---until he realises how his unit buddies see him admiringly. Michael becomes the new Commander of the entire post, which means his family has to act very carefully as to not do anything controversial. Everyone seems to be handling it well, but suddenly Amanda is nowhere to be found. Michael and Claudia Joy conclude that she went to go see Jeremy.
13	13	"Goodbye Stranger"	Jeff Melman	Katherine Fugate	August 26, 2007	4.08
When several boxes of ammunition go missing from storage Fort Marshall goes into FPCON and everyone, from senior officers to soldiers' families, is on high alert. Trevor, Frank and Chase are to be deployed several days earlier than expected due to the threat. Michael's promotion to brigadier general is sped up due to the alert. Amanda decides to break up with Jeremy and accept her offer at the University of Virginia instead. Gossiping Army wife Marilyn, usually at odds with Pamela but knowing Pamela keeps a deep dark secret for her, asks Pamela for help leaving her domineering husband. The fort brass become convinced wrongly that more than one soldier is involved in the ammunition thefts.

=== Season 2 (2008) ===
No. overall	No. in series	Title	Directed by	Written by	Original release date	US viewers (millions)
14	1	"Would You Know My Name"	Rob Spera	Katherine Fugate	June 8, 2008	4.52
In the aftermath of the bombing at the Hump Bar, the wives struggle to put their lives back together. Pamela discusses the bombing on her radio talk show and how to cope with the tragedy, including while Marilyn is buried. Jeremy returns to post to be with Denise. A depressed Roxy secludes herself when she does not hear from Trevor. Claudia Joy has a vivid dream that Amanda survived the bombing and is on her way to college. Joan and Roland reconnect in the wake of the explosion and try to work things out. The Army CID interviews survivors of the bombing, but Roxy refuses to cooperate until someone on base tells her whether Trevor is still alive. Joan finally tells Roxy Trevor is alive and moving place to place on deployment.
15	2	"Strangers in a Strange Land"	John T. Kretchmer	C.M. Nau	June 15, 2008	4.20
Joan is angry at Roland for telling the other wives about her pregnancy and, even after telling General Holden, is struggling with whether or not to terminate the pregnancy. Pamela is frustrated by Chase's ongoing absence and secrecy due to his work in Delta Force. Trevor is coping with his first deployment to a war zone and the realities of war. After Claudia Joy suffers a panic attack in the middle of the PX, she and Michael realize that they have to work through their anger at losing Amanda. Roxy fights to keep Betty in the army hospital when she is threatened with discharge, and manages to get her an extra week of care after which she will be moving in with Roxy and the boys.
16	3	"The Messenger"	Kevin Dowling	Katherine Fugate	June 22, 2008	3.75
Finn decides to ask Claudia Joy on a date. Denise bonds with a wounded soldier named Mac. Michael attempts to teach Emmalin how to drive the family truck. Chase tells Pamela and their children that he has to leave on another mission, which doesn't sit well with the kids now that they have a "real daddy." Betty informs Roxy that she hates children because she could not have any of her own.
17	4	"Leaving the Tribe"	Lloyd Ahern II	Story by : Nick Thiel; Teleplay by : Bruce Zimmerman	June 29, 2008	3.84
Roland is offered a job as a high school teacher after he begins to help Emmalin with her pain and helps some of her friends; Denise makes a new friend after bonding with Doctor Getty over motorcycles; Joan informs her troops of her pregnancy and joins pregnancy PT training. Betty goes back to the Hump bar for the first time since the explosion and asks Roxy help her with the rebuild. Frank does not like the fact that Denise is riding a motorcycle that a patient gave her. Roxy gets both distressing and good news about Trevor. Michael considers retirement in the continuing Hump Bar bombing aftermath.
18	5	"The Hero Returns"	Joanna Kerns	Katherine Fugate & Bruce Zimmerman	July 6, 2008	3.79
Roxy and the boys anxiously await Trevor's arrival home. Frank, still in Iraq, puts Denise's bike up for sale without her permission because he is worried about Denise's newfound independence. Joan is feeling the effects of her pregnancy and has doubts about her maternity leave replacement. Michael receives news that the body of a soldier killed in Vietnam has been found after being declared MIA for over three decades and is being flown into Fort Marshall.
19	6	"Thicker than Water"	Tawnia McKiernan	John E. Pogue	July 13, 2008	3.55
Claudia Joy helps a soldier who is reluctant to deploy to Iraq as her daughter is having difficulties adjusting. Gossip spreads that Denise and Getti are having an affair. Betty learns her cancer is spreading and tells Roxy about a lifelong dream. Roland wants advice about becoming a dad. Pamela gets an offer to do a weekend radio show in Atlanta. Trevor is uncomfortable with being called a hero and the attention he has been receiving since returning home.
20	7	"Uncharted Territory"	Stephen Gyllenhaal	Cynthia J. Cohen	July 20, 2008	3.65
The sex of Roland and Joan's baby is revealed. Roxy is given the task of rebuilding and reopening the Hump Bar. Pamela has suspicions of one of Chase's colleagues after a party shows he and his wife are living well beyond their means.
21	8	"Loyalties"	Jeff Melman	Story by : Edgar Lyall & Kevin Maynard; Teleplay by : Rob Bragin	July 27, 2008	3.60
Roland is falsely accused of inappropriate behavior with one of his students---a lesbian who's torn between her acceptance to West Point and her lover. Roxy hires a new waitress and is sued when she fires her for flirting with her husband. Pamela gets a shock of her life when Chase and several of his Delta Force colleagues are arrested in the middle of the night and the MPs refuse to disclose anything. With Claudia Joy's help, Roxy exposes the fired waitress as a lawsuit scammer. Roland and Joan ask Claudia Joy and Michael to be their baby girl's godparents. Chase is finally released and tells Pamela the shocking truth about why he and other colleagues were jailed--and it wasn't because they were accused of wrongdoing.
22	9	"Casting Out the Net"	Allison Liddi-Brown	Bruce Zimmerman	August 3, 2008	4.18
Denise re-evaluates her relationship with Getti when she learns Frank is coming home on leave from Iraq. Roxy enrolls in Roland's class to obtain her GED. Pamela befriends a journalist who interviews her for the local newspaper. Michael and Joan launch an investigation into allegations of soldiers dealing drugs at the high school on post and, to their shock, Jeremy is among the suspects.
23	10	"Duplicity"	Tim Hunter	Gil Grant	August 10, 2008	3.40
Joan is restricted to bed rest with pregnancy complications. Trevor is upset when his injury prevents his return to combat. Frank senses a change in Denise when he returns home from Iraq.
24	11	"Mothers & Wives"	Chris Peppe	John E. Pogue	August 17, 2008	3.50
Claudia Joy's mother makes an unexpected visit. Roland counsels a lonely teenager whose father was recently killed in Iraq. Roxy panics before taking her GED test.
25	12	"Great Expectations"	Peter Werner	Barbara Hall	September 7, 2008	3.85
Claudia Joy's father Randall drops by her house while her mother, who is estranged from Randall, is in town and finds herself caught in between them. Joan has a baby shower coming soon. Trevor learns that a buddy he saved in Iraq was killed in action. Pamela has do deal with a fan-cum-stalker who goes too far. Frank and Denise try to fix their marriage and Jeremy gets orders for his first deployment.
26	13	"Safe Havens"	Lloyd Ahern II	Bruce Zimmerman	September 14, 2008	4.13
Pamela becomes concerned when her stalker starts talking to her children. An enraged Roxy confronts Roland after he takes action when he learns about Trevor's addiction. Jeremy is being deployed for the first time. The Holdens get a visit from a diplomat guest.
27	14	"Payback"	John T. Kretchmer	Story by : Lyla Oliver; Teleplay by : John E. Pogue	September 21, 2008	4.37
Trevor gets into a minor accident. Frank and Denise decide to separate so that they can figure out how they can save their marriage. The Holdens' house guest gets too friendly with Claudia Joy, who hits him with a champagne bottle in self-defense, and it causes a diplomatic problem for Michael. Joan has just given birth to a daughter but runs into complications. Frank heads back to Iraq while Denise needs to find a peaceful place to figure out her marriage. Pamela decides to take action about the man who has been stalking her when he makes contact with her young daughter. Trevor is awarded the Silver Star and comes to a decision about it.
28	15	"Thank You for Letting Me Share"	Carl Lawrence Ludwig	Margaret Oberman	October 5, 2008	3.32
A new wife arrives on base and her competitive streak puts her at odds with Claudia Joy. Denise copes with the absence of Jeremy and Frank. Trevor gets help for his addiction and dealing with survivor's guilt. Meanwhile, Roland and Joan are happy to have Roland's mother visit until she criticizes his parenting skills.
29	16	"Sacrifices" "Transitions"	John Terlesky	Tim O'Donnell	October 12, 2008	N/A
Denise befriends the distraught wife of an injured soldier. Trevor's Army career hangs in the balance as he faces the possibility that he may be medically discharged if his shoulder does not pass the medical exam. Joan, Roland and Roland's mother conduct "interviews" to hire a nanny. Emmalin meets her pen pal Logan for the first time. Just when Chase and Pamela plan a birthday party for their son Lucas, Chase is called out for a mission at short notice, leaving Lucas angry and devastated.
30	17	"All in the Family"	Rob Spera	Cynthia J. Cohen	October 19, 2008	3.36
Roxy's mother Marda is back, this time with a boyfriend. After dealing with sleep-deprivation Joan and Roland leave their daughter with Claudia Joy and Michael for a date night to destress. Pamela works with Roxy at the bar to occupy herself during Chase's absence.
31	18	"Departures, Arrivals"	John T. Kretchmer	Nick Thiel	October 26, 2008	N/A
When Joan returns to work she and Roland realize how much parenthood has changed their lives. Frank and Denise try to move on with their lives after agreeing to separate. Michael gets offered a prized position---at NATO, in Brussels. Trevor tries to help repair the relationship between Roxy and Marda, which was strained after Roxy discovered Marda's boyfriend stole money from the bar. Emmalin's deepening relationship with Logan continues to alarm both her parents and their friends.
32	19	"Last Minute Changes" "Duty Calls"	Stephen Gyllenhaal	Wendy Gillis	November 2, 2008	3.94
The second season wraps up with the Holdens dealing with big changes. Meanwhile, Pamela wonders about her decision to marry into the Army---which costs her her radio show after Evan removes her over discussing it with callers. A young man claiming to be Betty's long-lost nephew, Collin, arrives unexpectedly at the bar to see Roxy. Roland must help a former patient. Collin challenges Roxy first with proposed bar changes and then with a disturbing proposition.

=== Season 3 (2009) ===
No. overall	No. in series	Title	Directed by	Written by	Original release date	US viewers (millions)
33	1	"Best Laid Plans"	Joanna Kerns	Bruce Zimmerman	June 7, 2009	3.48
Roxy, Denise, Roland and Pamela offer their support to Claudia Joy and Michael, who are unable to leave for Brussels because of Emma, while Trevor faces a tough decision when it is discovered that one of his men---who's Emmalin's pen pal, Logan, since returned from overseas---may have something to do with it. Roxy struggles to take control of the bar away from Collin but she and Trevor are on a tight budget. Denise faces serious consequences as news of her affair spreads around the hospital---and she's unaware that Mack's newly-returned ex-girlfriend exposed the affair. Trevor convinces Logan to change his intentions with Emmalin and Michael makes sure that change is permanent. Overseas, Frank volunteers to lead a dangerous mission. Pamela uses an old police contact to expose Collin. Michael and Claudia Joy are heartsick when he departs for Brussels alone.
34	2	"About Face"	Stephen Gyllenhaal	Debra Fordham	June 14, 2009	3.71
Newly fired from the hospital, Denise tries to learn Frank's fate after his unit runs into trouble in Iraq. She turns to Claudia Joy for help, but her friend is busy reestablishing a home base after deciding to stay in town with Emmalin. Pamela starts an orientation class for new army wives.
35	3	"Moving Out"	Kevin Dowling	Karen Maser	June 21, 2009	TBA
Claudia Joy continues looking for a new place while Emmalin's rebellious ways continue. Pamela is also on the lookout for a new place because her kids no longer want to share a room. Elsewhere, Roland is confronted by an outside therapist about the care available for soldiers and Trevor's career is in the balance after making a bad call during a drill.
36	4	"Incoming"	Chris Peppe	James Stanley & Diane Messina Stanley	June 28, 2009	3.14
Roland gets a job offer. Michael surprises Claudia Joy by returning home and she tries to reconcile him and their daughter Emmalin. Pamela finds a bigger house for her children. Frank is sent home by his commanding officer to take care of "domestic affairs" but Denise remains unsure about whether she wants to work out their marriage.
37	5	"Disengagement"	Peter Werner	Rebecca Dameron	July 5, 2009	3.62
Roxy's hope for a grand reopening of the Hump bar doesn't go off without a hitch. Pamela is offered a coaching position on her son's football team. Joan wants to get her daughter, Sarah Elizabeth, christened before her deployment to Iraq. Chase comes home early from his current deployment but has difficulty readjusting.
38	6	"Family Readiness"	Lloyd Ahern II	T.D. Mitchell	July 12, 2009	3.82
Pamela, Roxy, and Claudia Joy help Joan get ready for her daughter's christening. Lucky the dog arrives at Fort Marshall and Trevor takes it in, much to Roxy's chagrin. An Iraqi orphan gets help with a hand injury.
39	7	"Onward Christian Soldier"	Carl Lawrence Ludwig	Jennifer Schuur	July 19, 2009	3.79
Pamela tries to get her son's coach to use the better ways to teach the team sportsmanship. Denise and Frank try to repair their marriage. Joan and Evan are pitted against one another in a war games exercise. Haneen comes to stay with the Holdens while preparing for surgery and bonds with Emmalin---and inadvertently compels Emmalin to face and release her grief over Amanda's death.
40	8	"Post and Prejudice"	Rob Spera	Bruce Zimmerman	July 26, 2009	3.81
Joan and Evan compete against each other in Fort Marshall's annual war games exercise---with Joan unaware a mole among her troops betrays her game plan to Evan. Haneen's surgery is a success. Frank and Denise continue to work on their relationship. Pamela gives a young army wife advice on starting her own business. Joan flips the tainted script successfully against Evan in the war games exercise---and surprises Trevor with two encouraging developments.
41	9	"Coming Home"	Joanna Kerns	James Stanley & Diane Messina Stanley	August 2, 2009	3.89
Roxy learns that Finn has been struggling in class and has him tested for a learning disability. Trevor prepares for the promotion board to make Sergeant. Evan's war games cheating earns Michael's contempt and a departure from Fort Marshall. Claudia Joy accompanies Haneen back to the Middle East to reunite her with her family and while she is away, Michael and Emmalin spend time alone together in hopes of repairing their relationship---and they face their mutual grief over Amanda together.
42	10	"M.I.A."	John T. Kretchmer	Debra Fordham	August 9, 2009	3.55
Pamela's excitement over Chase's upcoming return home is cut short when she loses her wallet, forcing her to spend the day frantically retracing her steps. Roxy is surprised when Stella Raye (guest star Shelby Lynne), a country music singer she adored growing up, comes to the bar looking for work. Joan struggles with her deployment as she comes to the realization that she will be missing many of her daughter's milestones.
43	11	"Operation: Tango"	Lloyd Ahern II	Karen Maser	August 16, 2009	4.01
Claudia Joy and Denise find themselves serving as companions for the "merry widow" (guest star Kelly Bishop) of a former senator, who is visiting post for a ground-breaking ceremony in her husband's memory. Roland finds a way to comfort Joan about her upcoming deployment. Trevor helps a troubled young soldier in his squad. Pamela struggles to deal with her preteen daughter Katie. Roxy tries to impress the principal at an exclusive private school where she hopes Finn is accepted. Country star Jack Ingram performs at the Hump Bar.
44	12	"First Response"	Glenn Kershaw	Rebecca Dameron	August 23, 2009	3.86
Claudia Joy and Denise get into a car accident on their way to a spa weekend. Routine tests from the accident lead to a shocking diagnosis for Claudia Joy. Finn enjoys his first day at his new school, leaving TJ feeling left out so Trevor takes him on a fishing trip for some father-son bonding time. In Iraq, Jeremy is reminded of the preciousness of life when his friend is injured by an explosion.
45	13	"Duty to Inform"	Emile Levisetti	T.D. Mitchell	August 30, 2009	4.19
Michael and Emmalin are puzzled when Claudia Joy informs them that she does not want her friends or anyone on post to find out about her medical condition. Trevor begins his work as an army recruiter and finds the job is more challenging than he initially thought. Two weeks after Chase was expected to return home, Pamela begins to wonder why he hasn't gotten in touch with her. Demanding answers, Pamela camps out in front of the building where she believes Chase is being treated for injuries.
46	14	"Need to Know Basis"	Allison Liddi-Brown	Elizabeth Jacobs	September 13, 2009	3.90
Pamela finally gets the answers she's been seeking about Chase's whereabouts. Denise begins EMT training in an attempt to find a new career in the medical field. Jeremy witnesses a shooting that will change his life forever. Roxy comes to a decision about having a baby with Trevor. Michael gives Claudia Joy a present, a gold medical bracelet, but Claudia Joy doesn't like it at first.
47	15	"As Time Goes By"	Tom Verica	Bruce Zimmerman	September 20, 2009	3.29
When Roxy and Pamela meet two older army wives, Elsie (Lois Smith) and Virginia (guest star Barbara Barrie), in a nursing home, they get a glimpse into Fort Marshall during World War II. Elise and Virginia share their stories and relive their experiences through flashbacks. Roxy and Pamela discover the parallel challenges that army wives have dealt with throughout the years, while also seeing how society has evolved culturally.
48	16	"Shrapnel and Alibis"	Gloria Muzio	James Stanley & Diane Messina Stanley	September 27, 2009	3.38
Jeremy returns home unscathed, much to his parents' relief and delight, but is consumed by guilt over his buddy's death. Joan says an emotional goodbye to Roland and Sarah Elizabeth. Pamela and Chase struggle to get along after she catches him in a lie. Trevor's hard work finally pays off as his first recruit is sworn in.
49	17	"Fire in the Hole"	John Terlesky	Debra Fordham	October 4, 2009	3.33
Roxy, Denise, Pamela and Claudia Joy attend a golf tournament where they are confronted with both fierce opponents and Denise's competitive streak. Roland lands in hot water as he attempts to help a patient and Jeremy reunites with an old friend. In the meantime Michael receives bad news from a visiting 4-star General.
50	18	"Fields of Fire"	Rob Spera	Karen Maser	October 11, 2009	3.93
Michael and Claudia Joy prepare for Michael's promotion ceremony. Pamela reaches a breaking point in her marriage. Roland struggles with his increase in both workload and parenting duties since Joan's deployment. Roxy stresses about the family's financial future. Jeremy continues to struggle with grieving and must deal with the consequences of his actions at the Hump Bar.

=== Season 4 (2010) ===
No. overall	No. in series	Title	Directed by	Written by	Original release date	US viewers (millions)
51	1	"Collateral Damage"	Allison Liddi-Brown	Jeff Melvoin	April 11, 2010	3.32
Frank and Denise cope with the aftermath of Jeremy's breakdown, and Roland receives upsetting news about Joan. Meanwhile, Pamela takes the kids on a last-minute vacation. Claudia Joy is nominated for the Spenser Award for the best Army spouse of the year and meets a familiar face---her former rival Lenore, now re-married to the four-star general who may decide Fort Hamilton's fate.
52	2	"Scars & Stripes"	Rob Spera	Debra Fordham	April 18, 2010	3.15
Roland has to both worry about his daughter and figure out how he can support his wife, who is in Germany recovering from injuries. Denise and Frank try to help Jeremy through his PTSD. Trevor moonlights as a pizza deliveryman for extra cash, until he unexpectedly bumps into a familiar face. Roxy and Claudia Joy want the ban on allowing base personnel lifted at the Hump Bar. Roxy tells her friends that she's pregnant. To avoid the look of favoritism because Claudia Joy is her friend and ally, Roxy rounds up other bar owners to make a presentation to Michael on lifting the ban.
53	3	"Homefront"	Chris Peppe	Bruce Zimmerman	April 25, 2010	2.89
The bar ban is lifted. Lenore causes more trouble at the Spenser Award formalities, much to Claudia Joy, Pamela and Roxy's annoyance. Emmalin finds herself in a difficult situation when her friend sneaks alcohol into the party and gets alcohol poisoning as a result. While recuperating in the hospital Joan befriends several patients---especially a young second lieutenant who lost part of her right arm in battle. Terrence Price, now a fugitive, returns suddenly with a request for Roland. Finn and TJ finally learn they will soon have a brother or sister. Claudia Joy finally lays down the law to Lenore.
54	4	"Be All You Can Be"	Kevin Dowling	Karen Maser	May 2, 2010	3.15
Claudia Joy runs into an old friend from law school while visiting a college campus with Emmalin. Joan is back in Iraq leading a school-building project. Roland prepares for Sara Elizabeth's first birthday. Pamela weighs her options about divorcing Chase. One of Trevor's recruits who is about to deploy to Afghanistan has gone AWOL.
55	5	"Guns & Roses"	Emile Levisetti	Karen Maser	May 9, 2010	2.65
Fort Marshall is in a Mother's Day atmosphere. Claudia Joy as begins preparations for the annual FRG mother's day brunch. Michael and Emmalin's Mother's Day plans for Claudia Joy are ruined when they get a visit from his aunt Edie (guest star Ann-Margret). Denise gets a surprise present from Frank and Jeremy. Pamela endures another special occasion without Chase. Roland plans something special for Joan but mail is delayed and communications broken down due to a massive sandstorm. Dinner plans are derailed when Michael and Frank are unexpectedly called out on Army business and Trevor is stuck at the side of the highway after the car broke down so the wives and Roland all spend Mother's Day dinner at the Holden residence.
56	6	"Evasive Maneuvers"	Melanie Mayron	Rebecca Dameron	May 16, 2010	2.95
Denise and the wives reach out to recently PCS-ed Army wife Marisol Evans after finding out that she is the victim of spousal abuse. In order to keep her mind off of Chase, Pamela and Claudia Joy help organize a USO concert. While still in Iraq, Joan helps a homesick sergeant and does her best to keep morale high while the rebuilding of the schools continues. Guest appearance by Five for Fighting and Wynonna Judd
57	7	"Heavy Losses"	Donna Deitch	T.D. Mitchell	May 23, 2010	2.60
Pamela isn't sure if she should believe Chase about the effort he is willing to put into their relationship in order to make it work. Claudia Joy begins taking steps to finish of her law degree and has an interview with the dean of admissions. When Roxy begins suffering complications in her pregnancy Trevor isn't sure where to go for help, so he seeks out Roland's guidance. After receiving a promotion to specialist Jeremy, who has several months left on his initial enlistment contract, hopes that Denise will give him her blessing to enlist again.
58	8	"Over and Out"	Carl Lawrence Ludwig	James Stanley & Diane Messina Stanley	June 6, 2010	3.46
Roxy and Trevor come to terms with her miscarriage. Joan is very anxious to return home after rebuilding schools in Iraq. She hopes to receive orders allowing her to rejoin the unit she commanded before she was injured. A broken leg could end Emmalin's dreams of being a professional hockey player. Pamela and Chase take steps to change something in their marriage after their children begin to sense that something is wrong. Denise gets some surprising news and has to tell Roxy.
59	9	"New Orders"	Matia Karrell	Bruce Zimmerman	June 13, 2010	3.31
Roland plans a day trip to Savannah with Joan but when the babysitter backs out last minute Frank volunteers to watch Sara Elizabeth---with hilarious results when he needs Michael's help. Pamela's financial troubles come to a head when she visits the dentist and is informed that she needs a root canal. Trevor receives some unexpected news that he has to share with the family.
60	10	"Trial & Error"	Gloria Muzio	Debra Fordham	June 20, 2010	3.45
An advocacy lawyer whose case against the army puts Claudia Joy and Michael in a place they'd never been before on different sides of the army---involving a dumping site Fort Marshall leaders may have known might be toxic. Now that Denise is expecting, Jeremy helps her with chores around his house---including turning his room into a nursery for the new baby. Pamela has a new job in her former profession.
61	11	"Safety's First"	Joanna Kerns	Bill Rinier	June 27, 2010	3.31
Superstitions abound as Fort Marshall is on its 99th day without a fatality. Joan finally goes to the doctor and learns what is causing her symptoms. Denise is moved to dispatch duty at work due to her pregnancy and enlists Pamela's help to locate a caller in trouble. Trevor meets his new squad, which includes Jeremy, and has to lead them through a live fire exercise and earn their respect.
62	12	"Change of Station"	Rob Spera	James Stanley & Diane Messina Stanley	July 11, 2010	3.25
Pamela has doubts about Chase's new female neighbor. Frank and Denise discuss baby names. When Emmalin gets disappointing news about the recovery of her knee, Michael steps in to help. TJ has difficulty accepting his dad's upcoming deployment and Trevor's advice to him to be the "man of the house" somewhat backfires. Michael and Frank get some unexpected news from The Pentagon about the upcoming Afghanistan deployment. Pamela has a jarring experience when she and her partner catch a speeder she knows only too well.
63	13	"Army Strong"	John Terlesky	Rebecca Dameron	July 18, 2010	3.46
Claudia Joy, Denise and Roxy each deal with their husbands' imminent deployment to Afghanistan. Denise and Frank learn the sex of their baby. Joan has difficulty accepting the fact that she has a traumatic brain injury and is unable to deploy with her unit. Enjoying her return to police work, Pamela considers the possibility of dating again.
64	14	"AWOL"	James Bruce	Karen Maser	July 25, 2010	3.31
An AWOL soldier is arrested after missing her deployment, and Grant Chandler (Harry Hamlin) takes on the case---with Claudia Joy as his second while she probed into the real reason the young soldier went AWOL involving care for her infant daughter. Over in Afghanistan, Jeremy is in love with a skeptical soldier who sees him as just a foolish boy---at first.
65	15	"Hearts & Minds"	Glenn Kershaw	Jennifer Schuur	August 1, 2010	3.30
A very pregnant Denise stresses over Frank and Jeremy's absence. Joan shows improvement as her doctor allows her to spend a day alone with her daughter. To cope with the loss of customers due to the deployments Roxy decides to host a speed dating night at The Hump Bar and encourages Pamela to join. A hopeful Emmalin prepares a video to submit to college coaches.
66	16	"Mud, Sweats & Tears"	John T. Kretchmer	James Stanley & Diane Messina Stanley	August 8, 2010	3.33
Jill Biden (as herself) comes to visit Fort Marshall and discusses challenges face by military families with a deployed relative. As preparations for the fun run heats up, the Army wives get a friendly rivalry going with the Marine wives. Denise is caught in the middle when her sisters come to visit and bicker throughout the day. Chase seeks help from Roland. In Afghanistan, the village Trevor and Jeremy are patrolling is targeted by suicide bombers.
67	17	"Murder in Charleston"	Allison Liddi-Brown	Bruce Zimmerman & T.D. Mitchell	August 15, 2010	3.60
Pamela and Atlanta PD detective Gina Maddox (Gabrielle Union) investigate a murder case involving a dishonorably discharged Iraq veteran and his abused girl friend whom Gina has cultivated as an informant, but the case leads to black-market dealings and a surprise suspect. Michael informs Claudia Joy he won't be in contact for several days because of a mission.
68	18	"Forward March"	Joanna Kerns	Debra Fordham	August 22, 2010	3.91
In the fourth season finale, Denise goes into labor while on the phone with Jeremy. Claudia Joy receives disturbing news as Emmalin prepares for graduation. Pamela reconsiders her future after a talk with Gina and Joan must make a life-changing decision.

=== Season 5 (2011) ===
No. overall	No. in series	Title	Directed by	Written by	Original release date	US viewers (millions)
69	1	"Line of Departure"	John T. Kretchmer	Debra Fordham	March 6, 2011	4.23
Denise has her hands full with her newborn baby while getting ready to meet her future daughter-in-law. Claudia Joy prepares to send Emmalin off to college. Roxy is having problems with her preteen son TJ and gets an unexpected visitor. Pamela has to decide whether she's going to stay with Chase or take a job with the Atlanta PD, but something Boone says complicates her decision. Joan and Roland discuss the next step in their relationship.
70	2	"Command Presence"	Carl Lawrence Ludwig	Karen Maser	March 13, 2011	3.36
Pamela makes a decision about her future. At Claudia Joy's law school graduation, Professor Chandler (guest star Harry Hamlin) offers her a part time job working as an associate in his firm. TJ's rebellious ways continue and Trevor's absence is taking a toll on Roxy. Joan has been made garrison commander while Roland feels sidelined.
71	3	"Movement to Contact"	John T. Kretchmer	Rebecca Dameron	March 20, 2011	3.84
Claudia Joy begins her first day working as an associate in Professor Chandler's law firm, but the day takes an unexpected turn when he yells at her. With Trevor still refusing to speak to her and TJ being rebellious, Roxy is near breaking point. Roland and Joan have to figure out where their daughter will go to preschool. Claudia Joy, Denise, Roxy and Pamela welcome Jeremy's fiancée Tanya into the "tribe" and plan for her bridal shower.
72	4	"On Behalf of a Grateful Nation"	John Terlesky	T.J. Brady & Rasheed Newson	March 27, 2011	4.79
The wives support each other as Denise and Frank deal with the loss of their son Jeremy. Trevor, Jeremy's squad leader, decides to remain in Afghanistan as the other squad members are still reeling from his death. Pamela worries about Chase, who, unknown to her, had been deployed on a classified mission at short notice.
73	5	"Soldier On"	Rob Spera	Bill Rinier	April 3, 2011	3.35
The loss of Jeremy is still keenly felt. Claudia Joy tries to help Denise cope with her grief. Roxy and the boys deal with their own fears after learning that Trevor was at the scene of Jeremy's death. Roland wrestles with his guilt as he had been the one to declare Jeremy psychologically fit for duty. Pamela understands she's still in love with Chase and they decide to marry again. Meanwhile in Afghanistan, Michael, Trevor and the 23rd have their own issues to deal with---including Michael's fear that his unintended PR mishap may mean the end of his military career.
74	6	"Walking Wounded"	Chris Peppe	James Stanley	April 10, 2011	3.44
Claudia Joy copes with memories of Amanda. Roxy considers expanding her business. Pamela and Chase monitor their behavior in front of their kids. Roland begins to lose confidence in himself.
75	7	"Strategic Alliances"	Melanie Mayron	T.D. Mitchell	April 17, 2011	3.49
Claudia Joy and Chandler try to help an Army wife who is being threatened with deportation. Roxy finds a way to cut costs and move forward with the truck stop. Roland and Joan offer to watch Molly when Denise comes down with the flu. Pamela and Chase get married at the Hump Bar.
76	8	"Supporting Arms"	Emile Levisetti	Mary Leah Sutton	May 1, 2011	3.12
Claudia Joy receives news regarding her tumor. Chandler finds an unlikely ally in Michael to help with the deportation conundrum. Roxy and Pamela disagree over how Roxy is handling the truck stop and Whit's presence. Roland and Joan talk further about whether she should try for another baby or consider adoption. Michael has exciting news for Claudia Joy.
77	9	"Countermeasures"	James Bruce	Debra Fordham	May 8, 2011	3.35
As the 23rd comes home to Fort Marshall, Roxy finds herself in big trouble. With Trevor coming home she hopes to delay news of the truck stop as long as possible. Denise accompanies Frank to greet the returning troops and meets Jeremy's friends. When one of Roland's patients OD's, he and Joan decide to see if they could adopt her son, Bobby.
78	10	"Battle Buddies"	Brian McNamara	Karen Maser	May 15, 2011	3.28
Pamela and Claudia Joy try to get a homeless former Army helicopter pilot to tell the whole truth about what happened to her to help her get her life back on track. A hidden truth at the law firm makes for a stilted work atmosphere. Roland and Joan consider the true meaning of raising a child with special needs. The pilot finally admits she was raped by a fellow soldier, but Michael learns to his horror the reason why the man can't be punished for the crime. Roxy and Trevor are still not on speaking terms and it begins to affect their daily activities.
79	11	"Drop Zone"	Rob Spera	James Stanley	May 22, 2011	3.66
Claudia Joy receives news of her Bar results, while Joan and Roland continue their journey into adopting David. The troops of the 23rd Airborne Division prepare for a night parachute jump, which sees events turn for the worse. Denise realises she's ready to go back to nursing with a little help from Joan. But the jump mishap and injuries anger Michael, already still fearing a pending end to his Army career. The Burtons hold a garden party with "the tribe" and David is introduced to the kids. Pamela's traffic stop of a driver with a broken tail light threatens to turn worse because of a possible DUI charge---and the man behind the wheel.
80	12	"Firefight"	John Terlesky	Rasheed Newson	June 5, 2011	3.47
Emmalin and Michael's disagreement about their futures puts Claudia Joy in the middle. David has difficulty at his new school but is reluctant to tell Roland and Joan---even as Roxy's older son T.J. befriends and defends him. Denise goes back to work as a nurse . . . and makes a surprise re-acquaintance at the hospital. Michael shakes off his DUI near-miss---and the unexpected publicity that angers him and Claudia Joy alike---and finds a way to help Emmalin after all. Trevor considers attending Officer Candidate School. Chase advises Trevor to think hard about OCS versus his real field leadership as an NCO. Pamela finds herself in a dangerous situation during a drug bust. Chase prepares for his discharge and is offered management-level job in California, which promises better pay than his and Pamela's current salaries combined and regular working hours. Pamela and Boone learn the leak of Michael's traffic stop came from inside the police department---from a source out to settle a score with the Army.
81	13	"Farewell to Arms"	John T. Kretchmer	Debra Fordham & Jeff Melvoin	June 12, 2011	3.61
Michael's reputation is on the line. Joan has difficulty bonding with her adopted son, David. Roxy's truck stop finally nears completion---after Trevor surprised her with a suggested contractor to bring the project up to speed with codes within a week. Denise helps Tanya grieve and to cope with life without Jeremy. Roxy and Trevor are forced to tell Finn and TJ about the boys' biological fathers. Michael reveals that the 23rd Airborne Division is being disbanded leaving Claudia Joy, Denise, Roxy, Pamela, and Roland and their spouses nervous about what the future holds for them now.

=== Season 6 (2012) ===
No. overall	No. in series	Title	Directed by	Written by	Original release date	US viewers (millions)
82	1	"Winds of War"	John T. Kretchmer	Karen Maser	March 4, 2012	3.63
(Part One) The Army wives prepare to leave Fort Marshall and go their own way. Roxy is still in denial over having to move. Joan is working overtime as she prepares to close the base. Molly's first birthday is celebrated. In the meantime, a hurricane is coming towards Charleston and threatens to hit Fort Marshall.
83	2	"Perchance to Dream"	Rob Spera	T.J. Brady & Rasheed Newson	March 4, 2012	3.63
(Part Two) After getting injured during the hurricane, Denise is in a coma and fights for her life. Pamela and the kids move in with Roxy and Trevor after her apartment building gets damaged. Joan is overwhelmed managing the aftermath. In her coma, Denise dreams of what might have been for Jeremy, Tanya, and the children they will never have. The hurricane's near-complete wipeout of Fort Hope---whose command will be investigated over preparedness issues---provides unexpected good personal news for Michael.
84	3	"The Best of Friends"	Joanna Kerns	Linda Gase	March 11, 2012	3.04
The LeBlanc home is in chaos and the kids are driving Trevor insane. An old friend of Denise's arrives on base. Joan and Roland's adopted son David begins to come out of his shell. Roxy gets some news about hers and Trevor's housing situation. Pamela deals with being apart from Chase and learns that her apartment has been condemned. Jackie Clarke (Kelli Williams), wife of Major General Kevin Clarke (Robert John Burke), moves from Fort Hope along with the rest of the hurricane-affected families and joins the tribe of Army wives.
85	4	"Learning Curve"	Carl Lawrence Ludwig	Rebecca Dameron & James Stanley	March 18, 2012	2.83
Claudia Joy is jealous of Denise's friendship with Jackie Clarke, and turns to an old friend, Audrey Whitaker (Susan Lucci), the wife of Michael's former CO. Roland's luck changes at the Youth Activities Center. Trevor is still adapting to his position as an officer while Roxy adjusts to being an officer's wife. Craig Morgan performs at the hurricane relief concert.
86	5	"True Colors"	Alex Shevchenko	Bill Rinier	March 25, 2012	2.70
Roxy has an opportunity to be more involved with the Army through her FRG while tension rises between Claudia Joy and Jackie. Meanwhile, General Clarke criticizes Joan for not combining the bases sooner. Claudia Joy hears a rumor about the Clarkes from Audrey Whittaker.
87	6	"Viral"	Chris Peppe	Marlana Hope	April 1, 2012	2.60
The Burtons struggle with the social stigma regarding David's condition. Trevor is concerned about one of his men PFC Hector Cruz (Joseph Julian Soria) and Roxy helps Cruz's wife Gloria (Alyssa Diaz) adjust to life as an Army wife. Backed by "the tribe", Roland and Joan decide to take action for David's sake.
88	7	"System Failure"	John T. Kretchmer	Rebecca Dameron	April 8, 2012	3.10
Claudia Joy finds out that her kidneys are failing and must live on dialysis until a kidney is available for transplant. Emmalin wants to donate one of her kidneys, but the doctors will not let her for fear of complications. Denise considers being Claudia Joy's life donor instead. Finn has his 10th birthday party. Roxy, Denise and Gloria cope with their husbands' sudden deployment on a mission. Tanya also finds herself deployed when she swaps rosters with a co-worker.
89	8	"Casualties"	James Bruce	Ken LaZebnik	April 15, 2012	2.91
The troops land in Africa and try to negotiate peace with battling tribes in Narubu. Trevor's company is trapped in a tense standoff with a militia while evacuating medical personnel. Roxy encourages fellow Army wife Min-Ji Webster to again participate in FRG. Roxy and Roland help the spouses and children deal with the sudden deployment to Africa. Roland learns of Charlie's secret.
90	9	"Non-Combatants"	John T. Kretchmer	T.J. Brady & Rasheed Newson	April 22, 2012	3.18
A memorial service is held for Min-Ji. Roxy feels guilt and partial responsibility for Min-Ji's suicide. Nicole negotiates a resolution to the conflict with the militia in Africa, but the troops run into trouble during the return trip to base. Frank, Trevor and Hector evacuate the last Americans but are forced to make a difficult decision about leaving a group of innocent orphans behind. Dr. Hanson kisses Tanya, but then leaves saying their situation is hopeless.
91	10	"After Action Report"	Melanie Mayron	Karen Maser	April 29, 2012	2.81
Frank has been having nightmares since returning from Africa. Jackie feels overwhelmed and alone with all of her army duties and keeps taking pills, concerning Denise. Roxy and Trevor help Gloria and Hector balance the books when they run into money issues. Roxy hires Gloria as a barista at The Hump Bar to help them out. Tanya and Dr. Hanson begin a romance but are held back by strict rules against fraternization between officers and enlisted personnel. Meanwhile, Roland and Joan invite Charlie and Nicole, her partner, in hopes of making them feel more comfortable and accepted. Afterwards, Nicole proposes to Charlie. At the end of the episode, the news shows Rachel Miller accusing the army of wrongdoing after they refused to take in the children.
92	11	"Fallout"	Brian McNamara	Linda Gase	May 6, 2012	3.07
Major General Holden leads an inquiry into the incident with the orphans in Narubu when the aid worker took the story to the press while Major General Clarke, who commanded the mission, Frank and Trevor and their wives deal with the aftermath. Preparations for the division banquet are derailed when Jackie gets drunk on the wine and "the tribe" of wives rally to cover it up from their husbands. Roland meets with the man who claims to be David's real father.
93	12	"Blood Relative"	John T. Kretchmer	James Stanley	May 13, 2012	2.61
Denise finds that she is a kidney match for Claudia Joy, causing her and Frank to make a difficult decision. Joan is concerned about David meeting his birth father, who has a somewhat questionable past. A recovering Jackie reveals her past and clarifies some issues to the wives. Dr. Hanson decides he must transfer to another base rather than risk his or Tanya's future in the Army. Trevor considers transferring to a Ranger battalion but Roxy refuses to move away from Fort Marshall. When she faints at The Hump Bar Trevor takes her to the hospital where the doctor stuns them with some unexpected news.
94	13	"General Complications"	Joanna Kerns	Bill Rinier	May 20, 2012	2.77
Michael is promoted to Lieutenant General, and Audrey Whitaker (Susan Lucci) wants more than the credit for it. Grateful for her new friends, Jackie reveals the source of Audrey's demand---tied to an old rumour about Kevin and the overseas party that ended the Army career of Audrey's husband, Michael's former CO. David gets to know his biological father, but Joan doesn't like what is happening. Roxy and Trevor discover they are having twins. Hector disapproves of Gloria working at the Hump Bar after he sees a soldier behaving inappropriately around her, and it strains their marriage---especially when his attack on the soldier earns him extra duty and a stern reprimand from Trevor. The 32nd Airborne learns it is being deployed again. Claudia Joy and Denise appear to pull through their surgeries, when Claudia Joy suddenly flatlines.
95	14	"Fatal Reaction"	James Bruce	Rebecca Dameron	June 24, 2012	3.33
Claudia Joy survives the kidney transplant from Denise. Frank and Michael rent a beach house for their wives to recover. David secretly communicates and meets with Marcus. Roxy publicly announces that she is pregnant with twins. Trevor worries she is working too much, causing her to have complications. Hector and Gloria are still at odds over her working at The Hump and his performance in training continues to suffer. Claudia Joy and Denise go to the beach house and get held captive by a man they had met earlier on the beach. After Claudia Joy manages to stab the man with her insulin needle, Denise grabs his gun and kills their captor.
96	15	"Tough Love"	Susan E. Walter	Marlana Hope	July 1, 2012	3.02
Denise wrestles with guilt over killing her attacker. Claudia Joy takes up sharp-shooting after the ordeal. While TJ is away on a class trip one of Trevor's buddies from OCS, Lt Cody Anderson, comes to Fort Marshall for surgery after being injured in Afghanistan and his wife, Jessica (Anna Chlumsky), confesses to Roxy she's having trouble handling his depression over his facial disfigurement. Gloria is happy to receive gifts from Hector, only to discover his affair with another woman. Joan and Roland are livid when Marcus takes David to his old neighborhood and gets into a fight. Jessica leaves Cody, throwing him even further into depression.
97	16	"Battle Scars"	Alex Shavchenko	T.J. Brady & Rasheed Newson	July 8, 2012	3.29
Roxy and Trevor try to help Cody deal with his depression while Gloria goes to marriage counseling with Hector. Nicole must find the right time and way to tell her mother (Patti LuPone) about her engagement to Charlie. Claudia Joy helps a retired army vet (M. Emmet Walsh) whom the VA has mistakenly listed as "deceased". Joan, Roland and Marcus come to an understanding. A surprise conversation with a compassionate Gloria convinces Cody he still has a place in the Army.
98	17	"Hello Stranger"	Thom Rainey	Rob Forman	July 15, 2012	3.49
Pamela and Chase invite Roxy and Trevor to meet them in Miami for a weekend getaway, and Roxy gets excited over a job opportunity that Chase offers to Trevor. Back at Fort Marshall TJ and Finn are staying with the Burtons and Joan makes a shocking discovery when she drops in on TJ and David. When her daughter Sophie (Skyler Day) visits Fort Marshall from boarding school, Jackie realizes that their relationship has become strained. Gloria manages the Hump Bar successfully while Roxy and Trevor are away. At the base hospital, a bullying doctor accuses Tanya of nearly causing a patient's death after he orders her to administer the wrong medication. It puts Tanya's career in jeopardy---until Denise and Claudia Joy help her discover she's not the only nurse the doctor threatened or ruined similarly. Roland and Joan come to terms with David's rather advanced knowledge of certain human behaviour. After Jackie learns Sophie went to the Hump with faked I.D., Sophie forces Jackie to face a sad mistake of her own.
99	18	"Baby Steps"	Émile Levisetti	James Stanley	July 22, 2012	2.92
Trevor and Roxy argue over his Army career. Jackie is frustrated with Sophie's (Skyler Day) manipulation of her father. Denise considers becoming a nurse practitioner. Charlie and Nicole ask Roland for a favor. (NOTE: At this point the episode picks up "five months later.") Roxy is rushed to the hospital when her water breaks, Denise has begun her nurse practitioner classes, and Gloria is surprised by a visitor at her doorstep.
100	19	"Centennial"	Christine Moore	Karen Maser	August 5, 2012	2.82
Fort Marshall prepares to welcome military dignitaries for its centennial celebration, but a dangerous anti-war zealot is targeting Michael. Hector and Gloria deal with the aftermath of Penny's return. Roxy goes into labor but she and Trevor get some distressing news about one of the twins. Hector can't talk Gloria out of her demand for divorce. Special appearances by Joseph W. Westphal and General (Ret.) George W. Casey, Jr. and Mrs Sheila Casey.
101	20	"The War at Home"	Anna Foerster	Jason Lazarcheck	August 12, 2012	2.97
The fallout from the thwarted attack on Michael has the tribe leaning on each other, while Frank recovers from saving Michael from the anti-war zealot's bullets. Roland and Denise suspect one of David's friends has been abused, leading to an angry confrontation at the hospital between Denise and the girl's father. Roxy and Trevor are finally able to bring their second twin home from the hospital. Gloria confides in Jackie regarding her pending divorce, and announces that she wants to move back home to The Bronx. Hector finally faces responsibility for his marriage's end and gets a new perspective from his tough but encouraging sergeant. Denise and the Burtons are shocked to discover who really abused David's friend.
102	21	"Handicap"	Glenn Kershaw	Linda Gase	August 19, 2012	3.57
Kevin returns home after his injury, paralyzed below the waist, but determined to walk again without Jackie's help. While Denise trains to be a nurse practitioner, she flies by helicopter with Dr. Campbell to tend to a wounded soldier. The helicopter crashes on its return flight and Denise must perform surgery on Campbell. David's father Marcus also returns, as do his drug issues. Roland agrees to help him get treatment and allows him to temporarily stay at the clinic, which doesn't sit well with Joan when she finds Marcus there. Trevor comes home with the news that he has been reassigned to Fort Lewis in Washington and has 30 days to move but Finn has difficulty accepting it.
103	22	"Domestic Maneuvers"	Chris Peppe	Bill Rinier	August 26, 2012	3.37
Roxy deals with the final item on her to-do list in preparation for the PCS: to sell the Hump Bar. Despite the depth of her emotional attachment to the bar, she comes to a final decision, which is made easier when Gloria returns to Charleston. Kevin's low morale takes its toll on Jackie and especially their daughter, Sophie (Skyler Day). Joan disrupts Marcus' recovery and tells him that he'll never be allowed to see David again, which leads Marcus to overdose. Joan then reveals to Roland a dark secret about her past that helps him understand her reservations about Marcus. Frank and Denise see Michael with a woman who isn't Claudia Joy.
104	23	"Onwards" "Onward"	John T. Kretchmer	Rebecca Dameron & T.J. Brady & Rasheed Newson	September 9, 2012	3.30
The troops learn they are returning to Afghanistan. News spreads that Fort Marshall will be merging with an Air Force base, as Michael explains the mystery woman he was spotted with. Kevin is helped by a medical breakthrough and a tenacious physical therapist. Charlie gives up trying to conceive, as she and Nicole move forward with adoption plans. Joan comes to a crossroads regarding her career and family. Charlie and Nicole get a big boost in their adoption effort from two surprising sources. After the troops depart for Afghanistan, Michael receives a fateful telephone call.

=== Season 7 (2013) ===
No. overall	No. in series	Title	Directed by	Written by	Original release date	US viewers (millions)
105	1	"Ashes to Ashes"	Kevin Dowling	James Stanley	March 10, 2013	2.38
Fort Marshall is rocked by Claudia Joy's death. Stricken Michael learns she died of heart failure while touring bases around the world. Roxy and Pamela return for the funeral and the tragically reunited tribe plus Michael, Emmalin, and deployed Frank and Joan take trips down memory lane. Denise has to cut through red tape to bring Claudia Joy's body home. Emmalin is dismayed when Michael reveals Claudia Joy's funeral wishes.
106	2	"From the Ashes"	Kevin Dowling	Linda Gase	March 17, 2013	2.27
After the memorial for Claudia Joy, Roxy and Pamela prepare to return home and Roland makes plans to move to Baltimore for an assignment at Johns Hopkins. Emmalin worries about her father when he won't eat and can't sleep in the bed that he shared with Claudia Joy. The gang is joined by new faces Latasha Montclair, Maggie Hall and Holly Truman. All three get involved in a fight at the Hump Bar, along with Gloria and Roxy. Jackie has her hands full managing the Army-Air Force merger at Fort Marshall.
107	3	"Blowback"	Chris Peppe	Bill Rinier	March 24, 2013	2.45
Latasha, Maggie and Roland come together when their sons are involved in an incident at school. General Clarke returns to his battalion in Afghanistan, over Jackie's concerns that it is too soon. Gloria agrees to accept and sell Holly's pies at the Hump Bar---successfully. Tim Truman's outgoing personality and constant chatter unnerve his platoon mates, especially Hector. Michael listens to Maggie's NCO husband begin to talk about what compromised his Army career when news of an explosion at the battalion's base camp has Michael, the wives and Roland worried. After the source of the explosion is identified, Joan is relieved of her deployment and openly questions the troop draw-down in Afghanistan.
108	4	"Hearth and Home"	John T. Kretchmer	Karen Maser	March 31, 2013	2.12
Joan returns home to a warm welcome, but is openly disappointed that Roland still wants to proceed with plans to go on a three-month assignment in Baltimore and take Sara and David with him. Gloria accepts an offer to move in with Holly. Maggie and her husband Eddie move their blended family into the house Pamela and Chase once shared---right next to Latasha and her children, living in the former home of Roxy and Trevor. After complaining about her own kids' attitudes, Maggie is shocked to learn that Latasha's son, Gabe, is battling cystic fibrosis. Jackie makes an offer to Holly that may take some doing to fulfull. Meanwhile, Hector, Tim Truman and Corporal Montclair are relocated to Firebase Reno -- a more dangerous part of Afghanistan.
109	5	"Disarmament"	Brian McNamara	T.J. Brady & Rasheed Newson	April 7, 2013	2.60
As news of casualties in the most recent Afghan attack hit home, Holly asks the other wives how they can get by day-to-day during deployments. When David Burton, Deuce Montclair and Tanner Hall again get into mischief, Joan chastises Latasha and Maggie for not keeping better watch over their children. Frank figures out a way to be with Denise on their anniversary. Meanwhile, Patrick Clarke, recently graduated from West Point, returns home and tells Jackie he wants to go into battle as soon as possible. Patrick meets Gloria at Hump Bar and asks her on a date, which she reluctantly accepts. The two spend the night together, with Gloria not knowing that Patrick is Jackie's and General Clarke's son.
110	6	"Losing Battles"	James Bruce	Marlana Hope	April 14, 2013	2.66
Denise helps Michael sort through Claudia Joy's clothes and begins to miss her friend terribly, causing her to lash out at a diabetes patient who is not taking her treatment seriously. Gloria regrets moving too fast with Patrick, especially when she learns that he is deploying the next day. Eddie Hall learns that he is deploying to Afghanistan, which has his daughter Caroline wanting to move back in with her mother rather than stay with her stepmother, Maggie.
111	7	"Brace for Impact"	John T. Kretchmer	Rob Forman	April 21, 2013	2.58
Trying to be a bigger part of David's life, Joan attends his basketball game, which causes her to arrive late at the airfield to supervise the offload of a jet commanded by Air Force Colonel Kat Young (Brooke Shields). This gets Joan into hot water with General Holden, though Kat herself later causes friction with Michael. After a conversation with Jackie, Gloria tries to break things off with Patrick Clarke via email, but Patrick discovers his mom has intervened and pleads with Gloria to leave the door open for a possible relationship. Patrick and Eddie Hall take command of Firebase Reno, and Eddie's reputation as a hard-line sergeant precedes him. Meanwhile, Maggie tries to get closer to her stepdaughter, Caroline.
112	8	"Jackpot"	Christine Moore	Lynelle White	April 28, 2013	2.76
The wives are $2,600 short of their goal in collecting donations for a garden/reflecting pool in honor of Claudia Joy. Gloria discovers that Holly is a "human calculator" and used to regularly win at the game of black jack back home, and she convinces the other wives to kick in $500 as a casino stake for Holly. At the casino, Holly does well and is about $400 short of the goal, when the casino manager closes the $20 table, suggests Holly move to a $50 minimum table, and colludes with a waitress to get the naive Holly drunk on "iced tea". Holly's chip stack drops to $1,400 below the goal when Gloria discovers the ploy. Latasha suggests they risk the remaining chip stack at a craps table, and the girls meet the goal. In Afghanistan, Hector sees a letter addressed to Patrick Clarke with Gloria's return address. He wants to confront Lt. Clarke, but Corporal Montclair stops him, and Sgt. Hall---who believes in Hector's capabilities as a soldier---sets up a meeting to clear the air. Later, as the troops set out on an unauthorized patrol to disrupt Afghan rebels who are shelling the base, Hector saves Lt. Clarke and is put in for a Bronze Star, after which he finally tears up his photo of Gloria. Meanwhile, General Holden gives a speech to cadets at The Citadel, after which a female cadet (who turns out to be Colonel Kat Young's daughter) says she dreams of flying Apache helicopters. This would mean changing from the Air Force (which she calls "the family business") to the Army. She asks if Michael could arrange a meeting with her mother, as she is afraid of her mother's reaction. The meeting strains the already tense relationship between Michael and Kat, but also forces Kat to have an honest discussion with her daughter. This leads to rapprochement between mother and daughter---and between Kat and Michael, when they share a table at a dinner and Michael reveals something that may impact Kat's hope for the base to buy a particular land parcel.
113	9	"Blood and Treasure"	Kelli Williams	James Stanley	May 5, 2013	2.73
Penny returns, nearly nine months pregnant, and expresses some doubts about giving up her baby to Charlie and Nicole. After a conversation, Gloria agrees to meet her at a clinic for one of Penny's final check-ups. But Penny is struck by a car when getting off a bus, and is rushed to the hospital. Denise is called into the surgery, forcing her to miss the dedication of the Claudia Joy Holden Memorial Reflecting Pool. Penny's baby boy is saved, but Penny dies on the operating table. Elsewhere, Sgt. Hall and Lt. Clarke are verbally reprimanded by Col. Sherwood, but are told the unauthorized patrol will not be reported. Just after Joan tells Roland she is considering retiring from the Army to be with her growing family, General Holden tells her she has been recommended for a study program that will put her in line to be a one-star general. This doesn't sit well with Roland, who had just returned from Baltimore and announced that Johns Hopkins offered him a full-time position. Maggie discovers her stepdaughter has been drinking beer with friends, rather than going to the teen center as she had told her. Gloria writes a letter to Hector informing him that he has a son.
114	10	"Reckoning"	Brian McNamara	T.J. Brady & Rasheed Newson	May 12, 2013	2.31
Everyone rejoices when the troops get orders to return to Fort Marshall, though Gloria feels she doesn't belong as she is no longer an Army wife. Caroline sneaks out to drink with friends again, and has to call Maggie to get her out of a tough situation with a college-aged young man. Latasha worries about unexpected expenses that keep piling up. Hector receives a photo of his son, and laments the bad decisions he made while married to Gloria. With Tim due to return home, Gloria searches for a new apartment to give Holly and her husband some privacy. Joan is given a deadline by General Holden to decide on accepting an Army War College program, and she tries to weigh the opportunity against losing even more time with her family. Firebase Reno is left vulnerable as U.S. troops abandon the surrounding villages. Our soldiers come under a massive attack just days before they are to pull out of Afghanistan.
115	11	"Adjustment Period"	Debbie Allen	Karen Maser	May 19, 2013	2.58
The men return from Afghanistan, but not all come home unscathed. Holly is excited to reunite with Tim, but he struggles to readjust to life on the home front. Quincy's arm and hand injuries put his Army career in jeopardy, as Latasha continues to worry about the family's finances. Gloria, worried that Hector may have been seriously hurt, shows up to welcome him home while a disappointed Patrick looks on. Hector makes a sincere apology to Gloria for hurting her with his past behavior, and the two later go on a dinner date to celebrate Hector's promotion to corporal. Joan informs Michael of her decision about the Army War College. Colonel Sherwood and General Clarke discuss what they are leaving behind in Afghanistan, and ponder over whether the human sacrifice will mean anything.
116	12	"Damaged"	James Bruce	Marlana Hope & Bill Rinier	June 2, 2013	2.84
Latasha worries about Quincy's future in the Army as her family's financial troubles worsen. Eddie and Maggie want to help them, and Eddie asks Patrick if he can use his connections, namely his father, to get Quincy recommended for a non-combat job if it becomes necessary. Patrick saves Gloria and the Hump Bar from an accidental electrical fire that was contained to a small area. Gloria is caught between two men: she agrees to go out on a date with Hector but is torn when Patrick asks for a second chance. Denise volunteers for a relief mission to an earthquake ravaged country, and when another relief worker is injured, convinces Kat to delay the medevac jet even though a tropical storm is approaching. Tim's erratic behavior escalates and starts to worry Holly, until he finally breaks down at a memorial party for a deceased PFC, Ethan Green. Holly then enlists Hector to help Tim. Michael and Kat share a moment. Joan considers the changes her retirement will bring, and discusses it with Jackie.
117	13	"All or Nothing"	John T. Kretchmer	Linda Gase	June 9, 2013	2.41
Tim goes missing after discovering that he hurt Holly during a nightmare, and his platoon searches for him while trying to keep his absence quiet. After Hector tells Tim he'll always be there for him, Tim agrees to get treatment for PTSD. Denise catches Michael in a compromising position with Kat. Frank returns home to reunite with Denise. Quincy gives Latasha good news about his army career. Michael and Denise come to an understanding about Kat after Michael assures Denise he will never forget or disrespect Claudia Joy's memory. Roland and Joan prepare to leave Fort Marshall, and a retirement ceremony is held for Joan. Gloria is torn between Hector and Patrick, but says she's made a decision on one of them at the end of the episode.

== Specials ==
Title	Original release date
"Army Wives: A Final Salute"	March 16, 2014
The cast talk about their time on the show. The special features interviews from cast members, executive producers, as well as real life Army wives.
