= Vandegrift =

Vandegrift may refer to:

== People ==
- Alexander Vandegrift (1887–1973), United States Marine Corps Commandant and general
- Frances Matilda Van de Grift (1840-1914), American magazine writer and wife of Robert Louis Stevenson
- Josephine Van De Grift (1894-1927), Early 20th century American woman writer and playwright
- Margaret Vandegrift or Margaret Thomson Janvier (1844–1913), American writer
- Van Vandegrift (born 1969), American businessman

== Other ==
- USS Vandegrift (FFG-48), United States Navy Oliver Hazard Perry-class frigate
- Vandegrift High School, high school in Austin, Texas, United States

== See also ==
- Vandergrift (disambiguation)
