= United States naval district =

Regions and Districts of the U.S. Navy and U.S. Coast Guard

Map of 17 Naval Districts 1944

The United States Naval Districts is a system created by the United States Navy to organize military facilities, numbered sequentially by geographic region, for the operational and administrative control of naval bases and shore commands in the United States and around the world. Established in 1903, naval districts became the foundational system for organizing U.S. naval forces ashore during the 20th century. The term "Naval" forces includes United States Marine Corps and current United States Coast Guard units.

About half of nearly 20 numbered naval districts, after decades of service as successful naval operational support commands, were merged or disestablished by the U.S. Navy between 1970 and 1998. By 1999 the remaining U.S. naval districts were reorganized and renamed as Navy Regions, except for Naval District Washington DC. The revised U.S. Navy organization of 11 geographic regions is now administered under Commander, Naval Installations Command (CNIC) in Washington DC.

United States Marine Corps naval infantry forces operating with the USN are supported by the naval district system. Since 1903, USMC strength has grown immensely with combined-arms artillery, armor, and aviation capability, especially for expeditionary and amphibious warfare during World War I in Europe and World War II in the Pacific. Although part of the Navy Department, the Marine Corps is a separate branch of the U.S. armed forces that now maintains its own organization of USMC support base locations.

United States Coast Guard forces, responsible for U.S. maritime security, continue to operate today in nine USCG naval Districts, using a revised version of the original numbered United States Naval District map, consolidated under two USCG Area commands, CG Atlantic Area and CG Pacific Area.

In 1903 the Department of the Navy first created 13 numbered U.S. Naval Districts as a system to improve the naval defense of the U.S. coast and extended territories from foreign attack. The Secretary of the Navy ordered creation of a system of districts for "the purpose of decentralizing administrative functions with respect to the control of coastwise sea communications and shore activities in states and territories outside department headquarters in Washington DC".

The United States Naval District system established a geographic naval forces map, numbered in a clockwise sequence, that centralized under one regional command:

(a) Military coordination of all U.S. naval defense, security operations, and
(b) Administrative coordination of all naval activities, with specific exceptions, within the district and extended seaward waters thereof.

Navy Regulations article 1480 first laid down the boundary limits of naval districts, which were based on existing coastal lighthouse districts dating to 1838. "Those limits extend to seaward so far as to include the coastwise sea lanes" (art. 1486 (1), Navy Regulations). The Navy specified that "each naval district shall be commanded by a designated commandant (an appointed admiral or captain), who is the direct representative of the Navy Department, including its bureaus and offices, in all matters affecting district activity" (Art. 1481, Navy Regulations.).

During World War I and World War II, the number of Naval Districts grew from thirteen to seventeen.

The USN and USCG district system evolved continuously over the 20th century, with naval district shore activities, base facilities, and many ships, cutters, patrol boats, air stations, and jurisdictional map boundaries changing over the decades. Today, each of the current 11 U.S. Navy named Regions and 9 U.S. Coast Guard numbered Districts is commanded by a two star or one star rear admiral.

== Naval Districts in the U.S. Navy and U.S. Coast Guard ==
The 1903 U.S. Navy District Plan designated a major regional naval base or shipyard facility as headquarters for each district. Some districts had no staff until after the outbreak of World War I during August 1914.

During World War II, the U.S. naval plan had grown to define 17 numbered districts on a coastal map of the United States and global U.S. territories, starting with the First Naval District in the Atlantic northeast, then proceeding clockwise south through Florida, across the Gulf of Mexico Eighth District, up to the Great Lakes, west to the Pacific Ocean, and northwest to the Seventeenth District in Alaska and beyond.

In 1915, the newly formed United States Coast Guard also adopted the geographic organization of U.S. Naval Districts for operations and administration of USCG bases, stations, cutters, aircraft, and boats. As an agency in the U.S. Department of Treasury from 1790 to 1967, the USCG predecessor Lighthouse Board was the first maritime bureau to establish a district organization as directed by an 1838 act of Congress for steamboat safety.

When the U.S. Revenue Cutter Service and U.S. Life Saving Service merged to become the U.S. Coast Guard in 1915, the naval district map system was used to organize the combined service. In the Coast Guard naval district organization, USCG districts were placed in the CG Eastern Area or Western Area. The two Coast Guard Areas were each commanded by a USCG admiral senior to their district commanders. Later, during World War II the Coast Guard military organization also absorbed three other legacy U.S. maritime safety agencies: the Steamboat Inspection Service, Bureau of Navigation, and U.S. Lighthouse Service (USLHS).

United States federal law (Title 14 US Code) specifies the Coast Guard is a maritime multi-mission military branch of the U.S. armed forces, fully interoperable with the Navy and Department of Defense services outlined under Title 10 USC, that in time of war when directed by the President becomes a part of the U.S. Navy fleet, as happened during World War I and World War II.

Homeland Defense: Today's structure of land, air, and naval United States armed forces, with active duty and reserve components, was configured from 1903 to 1947 by a series of Congressional laws enacted to modernize U.S. state militias into a National Guard, strengthen military mobilization capability, and optimize U.S. land, air, and sea service organizations for the global conflicts of the 20th Century. The terrorist attacks of 11 September 2001 prompted efforts to improve United States homeland defense for the 21st Century.

Homeland Security: In 2003, when the Homeland Security Act transferred the Coast Guard from the U.S. Department of Transportation to the new U.S. Department of Homeland Security along with other federal protection agencies, CG District Commanders also began overseeing a coastal border organization of sectors.

Sectors, named by region, state, or city within each district, align the maritime multi-mission coastal, ports and waterways activities of Coast Guard forces with U.S. Homeland Security Customs and Border Protection officers at land boundary ports of entry. USCG Districts and USCG Sectors are key parts of DHS.

== First Naval District ==
First Naval District was established on 7 May 1903, headquartered at Portsmouth Navy Yard in Kittery, Maine for coastal defense of the New England states in accordance with Navy General Order No. 128 issued by Acting Secretary of the Navy Charles H. Darling. Until late 1915 no personnel were assigned to First Naval District staff. During World War I and World War II, large historic naval shipyards in the northeast United States peaked in ship building and repair activity. Naval bases in northeastern cities were key to supporting U.S. forces during the Battle of the Atlantic 1914–1918, and again in 1939–1945. By the end of World War II, First Naval District headquarters had transferred to Charlestown Navy Yard in Boston, Massachusetts, with geographic boundaries for coastal defense of Maine, New Hampshire, Massachusetts, Rhode Island, and Vermont.

From 1960 to 1980, the Navy closed several naval bases in the northeastern states. On 7 October 1976, First Naval District at the old Boston Naval Shipyard was disestablished and passed command to the Fourth Naval District in Philadelphia, PA. The New England states area of responsibility in the former First Naval District is now part of U.S. Navy Region Mid-Atlantic.

First Coast Guard District is headquartered in the downtown Boston Massachusetts harborfront, and protects the navigable waters of the northeast United States within boundaries that include the entire New England coast. First Coast Guard District encompasses the states of Maine, New Hampshire, Vermont, Massachusetts, Rhode Island, and Connecticut, plus eastern New York and northern New Jersey. First Coast Guard District includes five coastal sector commands, and is homeport for units including major Atlantic patrol cutters, buoy tenders, icebreaker tugs, homeland security boats, stations, shore bases, and a large air station on Cape Cod.

== Second Naval District ==
Second Naval District was the smallest of the original naval districts established in 1903. Second Naval District covered only Rhode Island and adjacent waters, including Block Island and NAS Quonset Point, with headquarters at Naval Station Newport, Rhode Island. Second Naval District was disestablished after the end of World War I on March 15, 1919, and its geography incorporated into the First and Third Naval Districts. The New England states area of responsibility in the former Second Naval District is now part of U.S. Navy Region Mid-Atlantic.

Second Coast Guard District: During World War II, when the U.S. Bureau of Navigation, a key part of the large central U.S. maritime transportation system, merged into the Coast Guard, the USCG designated the United States midwest geography containing the many navigable inland waterways of the Mississippi, Ohio and western rivers as the Second Coast Guard District with headquarters facilities in St. Louis, Missouri. After 50 years of protecting vital river transportation, in 1996 the Second Coast Guard District was disestablished, and all inland western rivers operations became part of the new enlarged Eighth Coast Guard District headquartered in New Orleans LA.

== Third Naval District ==
Third Naval District, headquartered at the Brooklyn Navy Yard in New York City, was established on 7 May 1903 in accordance with General Order No. 128, signed by Acting Secretary of the Navy Charles H. Darling. Puerto Rico was initially part of the district due to good communications between New York and Puerto Rico. In 1919 Puerto Rico was removed from Third District and placed directly under the control of the Chief of Naval Operations. By 1945 Third District geographic boundaries included: Connecticut, New York, the northern part of New Jersey (including counties of Mercer, Monmouth, and all counties north thereof), and also the Nantucket Shoals Lightship. In 1966, after the Brooklyn Navy Yard had provided significant maritime forces to win the Atlantic naval campaigns during both world wars, the U.S. Navy closed the aging yard as an operational naval base. Third Naval District was disestablished on 7 October 1976, and command functions were transferred to the Fourth Naval District in Philadelphia, PA. The northeastern states area of responsibility in the former Third and Fourth Naval Districts is now part of U.S. Navy Region Mid-Atlantic.

Third Coast Guard District operated from 1915 until disestablished on June 30, 1987, during Coast Guard re-alignment. CGD3 geographic area of responsibility was split between First Coast Guard District and Fifth Coast Guard District. On July 1, 1987, the Coast Guard consolidated major cutter, aviation, and shore base resources to a new Maintenance and Logistics Command (MLC) for the five remaining districts comprising Coast Guard Atlantic Area. As an agency in the U.S. Department of Homeland Security, after 2010 USCG Atlantic (and Pacific) Area MLCs were re-organized. USCG command for maintenance and logistics facilities now falls under one three star vice admiral, who is the Coast Guard Deputy Commandant for Mission Support.

Coast Guard founding in New York: New York City, the first U.S. capital, has been a key Coast Guard homeport ever since 4 August 1790, when the first Secretary of the Treasury Alexander Hamilton established the Revenue Marine (later renamed Revenue Cutter Service) there. Hamilton requested President George Washington and the First United States Congress authorize construction of 10 fast, armed cutters to be stationed at Atlantic seaports in the 13 original U.S. states for defense and maritime law enforcement (as Hamilton had earlier proposed in Federalist Paper No. 11 and Federalist No. 12). In 1789 Hamilton had also established the U.S. Customs Service for coastal commerce security, followed in 1791 by the U.S. Lighthouse Establishment for navigation safety.

U.S. Coast Guard Atlantic Area: New York Harbor, the major U.S. seaport from 1790 to 1914, continued serving as USCG Eastern/Atlantic Area headquarters from 1915 through the 1990s. In 1996 however, as part of the Coast Guard portion of the U.S. military's Base Realignment and Closure (BRAC) process, the service closed the large USCG cutter support base on Governors Island NY (a New York harbor defense fortification since 1776) and moved CG Atlantic Area headquarters to Portsmouth VA.

== Fourth Naval District ==
Fourth Naval District was established on 7 May 1903 headquartered at historic Philadelphia Naval Shipyard on the Delaware River at League Island, Pennsylvania, in accordance with General Order No. 128, issued by Acting Secretary of the Navy Charles H. Darling. Until 1915, no personnel were assigned to Fourth District staff. During World War II, some 40,000 workers labored around the clock to build and repair naval ships at the Philadelphia Navy Yard. By 1945, Fourth Naval District included the geographic areas with many facilities that were key to the war effort in Pennsylvania, the southern part of New Jersey (including the counties of Burlington, Ocean, and all counties south thereof), and Delaware (including Winter Quarters Shoal Light Vessel). On 7 October 1976, Fourth District absorbed the command functions of the First and Third Naval Districts. On 30 September 1980 Fourth Naval District was also disestablished, as Navy fleet operations at the aging historic bases in the U.S. northeastern states continued slowly moving to southern and western naval districts in the 1980s and 1990s.

Most U.S. Navy ship work at Philadelphia Naval Shipyard was decommissioned by early 2000, pursuant to recommendations by the Base Realignment and Closure commission, with the exception of supply depot logistics operations at Naval Support Activity Philadelphia. The northeastern states area of responsibility in the former Fourth Naval District is now part of U.S. Navy Region Mid-Atlantic.

== Fifth Naval District ==
This 1943 map shows the waters of the Fifth Naval District off North Carolina and Virginia

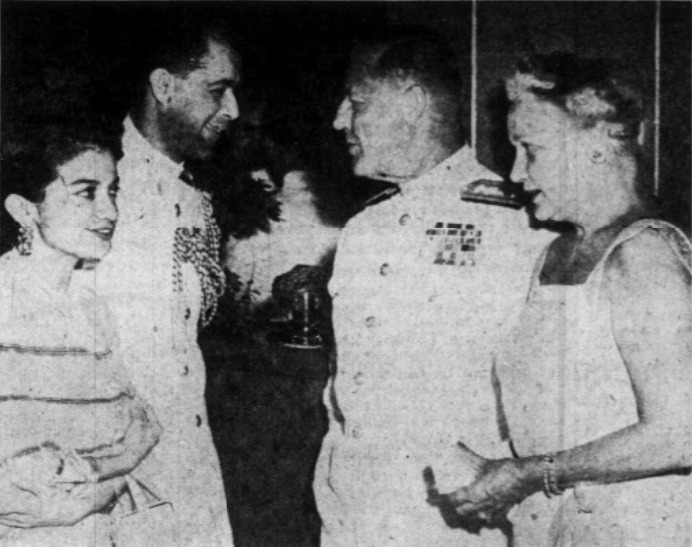
Royal Pakistan Navy Capt. S. M. Ahsan at the Commissioned Officers' Mess, Naval Base, with his wife (left), Rear Admiral I. N. Kiland, Commandant of the Fifth Naval District, and Mrs. Kiland on September 6, 1955.

Fifth Naval District was established on 7 May 1903 headquartered at the Norfolk Naval Shipyard in southeast Virginia, in accordance with General Order No. 128 issued by Acting Secretary of the Navy Charles H. Darling. No personnel were assigned to district staff until 1915, when Fifth Naval District headquarters was moved across the Elizabeth River to Naval Operating Base Norfolk. Starting in World War I, Norfolk, VA became the largest Navy location in the United States during the 20th Century. Norfolk Navy Yard, like historic naval shipyards in Boston, Brooklyn, and Philadelphia, was key to Navy ship repair and maintenance operations that led to victory in the Atlantic theater during World War I and World War II. During NNSY's peak of wartime activity from 1940 to 1945, 43,000 personnel were employed and 6,850 vessels were repaired.

By 1945, Naval Station Norfolk had grown enormously and also become headquarters for U.S. Navy Atlantic Fleet. Fifth Naval District boundaries included: West Virginia, Maryland (except 6 counties nearest the District of Columbia, Anne Arundel, Prince Georges, Montgomery, St. Mary's, Calvert, and Charles County); Virginia (except 6 counties nearest D.C., Arlington, Fairfax, Stafford, King George, Prince William, and Westmoreland County); plus northeast North Carolina (15 counties nearest Norfolk, VA, Currituck, Camden, Pasquotank, Gates, Perquimans, Chowan, Tyrrell, Washington, Hyde, Beaufort, Pamlico, Craven, Jones, Carteret, Onslow, and Dare County); also the Diamond Shoals Lightship.

Between 1960 and 1980, the Navy closed aging historic shipyards in the northeast United States and merged about half of the numbered naval districts for budgetary efficiency and military effectiveness. Atlantic bases in the Hampton Roads, VA region, expanding since 1942, grew even larger with added ships, submarines, aircraft, and naval amphibious activities at bases like Little Creek, Dam Neck, and NAS Oceana in Virginia Beach. But on 30 September 1980, Fifth Naval District became one of six original numbered districts disestablished on that date. The large area of responsibility for 20 northeast and midwest states in the former First, Second, Third, Fourth, and Fifth Naval Districts is now part of U.S. Navy Region Mid-Atlantic.

Fifth Coast Guard District headquarters is in Portsmouth VA. Coast Guard Atlantic Area command is also located in USCG Portsmouth HQ (transferred from USCG Base Governors Island NY in 1996). Fifth Coast Guard District operates within geographic boundaries that include the entire mid-Atlantic east coast from southern New Jersey, the Delaware River, Pennsylvania, Chesapeake Bay, Maryland, Washington DC, Virginia, and North Carolina. Fifth Coast Guard District includes four coastal sectors, and is homeport for afloat and shore units including major Atlantic patrol cutters, forward deployed maritime security cutters patrolling the Persian Gulf, buoy tenders, homeland security boats, stations, shore bases, and two Coast Guard air stations including a major USCG Shipyard in Baltimore MD, and a major USCG Aircraft Station and Maintenance facility in Elizabeth City NC.

== Sixth Naval District ==
Sixth Naval District was established on 7 May 1903 with headquarters at Charleston Naval Shipyard in Charleston, South Carolina, in accordance with General Order No. 128, signed by Acting Secretary of the Navy Charles H. Darling. No personnel were assigned to Sixth District staff until 1915–1916. Sixth Naval District peaked with the activity of 8,000 workers as Charleston Naval Shipyard and Naval Base Charleston grew from 1930 to 1960, supporting shipbuilding, repair, and fleet operations for many ships and submarines. Sixth Naval District boundaries included South Carolina, Georgia, and most of North Carolina, except fifteen northeastern North Carolina coastal counties nearest Virginia, which were part of Fifth Naval District.

Sixth Naval District was disestablished along with the Fourth, Fifth and Tenth Naval Districts on 30 September 1980. But Charleston Shipyard remained a major naval installation throughout the Cold War as homeport to numerous Navy cruisers, destroyers, attack submarines, ballistic missile submarines, destroyer tenders, and submarine tenders of the U.S. Atlantic Fleet. The 1993 Base Realignment and Closure Commission report recommended final closure of the Naval Base on 1 April 1996. The south Atlantic states area of responsibility of the former Sixth Naval District command is now part of U.S. Navy Region Southeast.

Coast Guard Base Charleston: Since the 1990s, U.S. Congressional representatives and senators from South Carolina have advocated for maritime agencies to re-locate federal government facilities to the former Charleston Naval Base, such as U.S. Coast Guard Sector Charleston and Charleston's National Weather Service office, a bureau of the National Oceanic and Atmospheric Administration.

In 2020 the Coast Guard Commandant announced a USCG plan to station more new major cutters and enlarge shore operations facilities at Base Charleston during this decade, as a "future Coast Guard operational center of gravity" for Atlantic Area cutters homeported in Seventh Coast Guard District.

== Seventh Naval District ==
Seventh Naval District comprising all waters around Florida, was a district renamed as Navy Region-Southeast in 1999. Commander, Navy Region Southeast (NAVREGSE) headquarters is located in Jacksonville, Florida, home to major U.S. Navy Atlantic Fleet shore base installations including Naval Station Mayport, FL. Seventh Naval District headquarters was previously located at Naval Air Station Key West, FL for many years. Most of the current day boundaries of NAVREGSE encompass the former 1903 naval districts of the Sixth, Seventh and Eighth Naval Districts. US Naval shore activities formerly in Tenth Naval District on island bases in the Caribbean Sea are now also part of Navy Region Southeast.

Seventh Coast Guard District headquarters is located in Miami, Florida. The geographic boundaries of the Seventh District include the entire coast of the state of Florida, except the western panhandle central time zone area from Apalachicola to Alabama, which is part of the Eighth District. Seventh Coast Guard District also includes the entire coast and waters of the states of Georgia and South Carolina, and operations in U.S. territories in the Caribbean Sea, Virgin Islands, and Puerto Rico. Seventh Coast Guard District includes six coastal sectors and is homeport for afloat and shore units including major Atlantic, Gulf of Mexico, and Caribbean patrol cutters, buoy tenders, homeland security boats, stations, shore bases, deployable maritime security units, and four Coast Guard air stations.

== Eighth Naval District ==
Eighth Naval District gulf coast headquarters was located in New Orleans, Louisiana from 1903 until the 1960s, when the U.S. Naval Station became Naval Support Activity New Orleans. NSA NOLA was home to Commander, Naval Reserve Force and other major Navy and Marine Corps commands until the naval base size was reduced by the BRAC process in 2011. Naval base New Orleans is now renamed Marine Corps Support Facility NOLA. The U.S. Marine Corps Reserve HQ is still located on the naval base, along with U.S. Coast Guard Sector New Orleans. Historically, Eighth Naval District also had a second headquarters location at the Pensacola Navy Yard. All U.S. Navy support commands in the former Eighth Naval District Gulf of Mexico area are now part of U.S. Navy Region Southeast.

Eighth Coast Guard District command headquarters is the port of New Orleans for the USCG gulf coast, as well as inland western rivers. Eighth District boundaries include the Gulf of Mexico coast from Texas, Louisiana, Mississippi, and Alabama, to the Florida panhandle central time zone, west of Apalachicola, plus a small part of southwest Georgia.

Eighth District is by far the largest Coast Guard District geographic area, with a secondary HQ base in St. Louis MO supporting the inland western river system. The Eighth District map includes 26 states from Pennsylvania to Wyoming, through which flow many navigable western rivers, part of the vast inland waterways transportation system in the industrial and agricultural heartland of the United States. Eighth Coast Guard District includes seven sectors (four coastal, three river) and is homeport for major afloat and shore units including Gulf of Mexico patrol cutters, inland river cutters, Atlantic patrol cutters, buoy tenders, homeland security boats, stations, shore bases, deployable maritime security units, and three Coast Guard air stations including large pilot training bases.

== Ninth Naval District ==
Ninth Naval District was established on 7 May 1903 in accordance with General Order No. 128, signed by Acting Secretary of the Navy Charles H. Darling, for command of the United States Great Lakes area, with headquarters at the new naval training station on Lake Michigan near North Chicago, Illinois . Construction of Naval Station Great Lakes was authorized during the presidency of Theodore Roosevelt, who starting in 1897 had expanded U.S. naval sea power in his earlier role as Assistant Secretary of the Navy. Ninth Naval District was activated in 1911 as part of an administrative unit called the "Ninth, Tenth, and Eleventh Naval Districts". In 1920, Ninth District became a separate Navy entity with its own district staff for the Great Lakes region states. Ninth Naval District boundaries expanded during World War II to midwest states beyond the Great Lakes by 1945, including Illinois, Ohio, Michigan, Kentucky, Indiana, Illinois, Wisconsin, Minnesota, Iowa, Missouri, North Dakota, South Dakota, Nebraska, and Kansas. Ninth Naval District was disestablished on 30 June 1979, and its functions divided between the Fourth, Eighth, Eleventh and Thirteenth Naval Districts.

In 1993 the Base Realignment and Closure Commission recommended closing two of three U.S. Navy Recruit Training Centers. RTC San Diego, CA and RTC Orlando, FL were shut down by 1999, making Recruit Training Command Great Lakes the sole Navy boot camp. Naval training centers of the former Ninth Naval District and naval shore activities in the Great Lakes states and are now supported by Naval Service Training Command and by U.S. Navy Region Mid-Atlantic.

Ninth Coast Guard District operates as the guardian of the U.S. Great Lakes, with headquarters on the south shore of Lake Erie in Cleveland Ohio. Coast Guard Ninth District works closely with agencies across the water border in Canada to protect the security, navigation (summer and winter), and natural environment of the large Great Lakes system from the St. Lawrence Seaway to Duluth, MN. Ninth Coast Guard District geographic boundaries include Lake Superior, Minnesota, Wisconsin, Lake Michigan, Illinois, Indiana, Lake Huron, Michigan, Lake Erie, Ohio, northwest Pennsylvania, Lake Ontario, and western New York state. Ninth Coast Guard District includes four sectors spanning the Great Lakes, and is homeport for afloat cutters and shore units including icebreaker patrol cutters, buoy tenders, homeland security boats, stations, shore bases, deployable maritime security units, and four Coast Guard air stations.

== Tenth Naval District ==
Tenth Naval District boundaries included the Caribbean Sea, but was headquartered at the new Naval Station Great Lakes on Lake Michigan near North Chicago, Illinois. Established on 7 May 1903 in accordance with General Order No. 128, signed by Acting Secretary of the Navy Charles H. Darling, the district was activated in 1911 as part of a larger administrative unit called "Ninth, Tenth and Eleventh Naval Districts". During the 1920s the Tenth was disestablished, but was reactivated on January 1, 1940, at San Juan, Puerto Rico under the command of Rear Admiral Raymond A. Spruance, USN. Tenth Naval District boundaries covered the Caribbean Sea, including Puerto Rico, Vieques, Culebra, Virgin Islands, Guantanamo Bay Naval Base, plus U.S. Naval shore activities at Jamaica, Trinidad, Bahamas, Antigua, St. Lucia, and British Guiana. Tenth Naval District was one of six original naval districts disestablished by the Navy after 30 September 1980.

U.S. Navy operational facilities in the Caribbean Sea have been significantly reduced since the 1990s, including Guantanamo, Cuba (GITMO) and Vieques, PR. Many shore activities and fleet training in the Caribbean moved to naval bases around Jacksonville and Mayport, Florida. Those facilities are now supported by Navy Region Southeast or United States Fleet Forces Command.

== Eleventh Naval District ==
Eleventh Naval District boundaries included the southwestern United States and Pacific coast of California. When established on 7 May 1903, headquarters was also originally located at the new Naval Station Great Lakes on Lake Michigan near North Chicago, Illinois as per General Order No. 128, signed by Acting Secretary of the Navy Charles H. Darling. Eleventh District was activated in 1911 as part of the larger administrative unit known as the "Ninth, Tenth and Eleventh Naval Districts". In 1920 the Eleventh Naval District became a separate Naval District with headquarters at San Diego, California. During World War II, Eleventh Naval District supported numerous Navy and Marine Corps facilities crucial to the Pacific war effort, including Naval Base San Pedro, Long Beach Naval Shipyard, Marine Corps Recruit Depot San Diego, and Air Station Miramar. From 1945 until 1980, Eleventh District included the geographic areas of: New Mexico; Arizona; Clark County, Nevada; the southern part of California, including Counties of Santa Barbara, Kern, and San Bernardino, and all counties south thereof. Eleventh Naval District was one of six original numbered districts disestablished on 30 September 1980.

All U.S. Navy and Marine Corps facilities, shore bases, and support commands in the southwestern United States from the former Eleventh Naval District are now part of Navy Region Southwest, headquartered in downtown San Diego, California.

Eleventh Coast Guard District operates on the California coast with headquarters on San Francisco Bay in Alameda CA. Coast Guard Pacific Area command is also located on Coast Guard Island in Alameda with Eleventh Coast Guard District. Eleventh District's geographic boundaries include all waters of California, Arizona, Nevada, and Utah. Eleventh Coast Guard District includes four coastal sectors and is homeport for afloat and shore units including major Pacific patrol cutters, homeland security boats, stations, shore bases, deployable maritime security units, and four major Coast Guard air stations.

== Twelfth Naval District ==
Twelfth Naval District was established on 7 May 1903 with headquarters at Mare Island Naval Shipyard in Vallejo, California, in accordance with General Order No. 128, signed by Acting Secretary of the Navy Charles H. Darling. During World War II, Twelfth District headquarters moved to San Francisco, California with geographic boundaries including northern California counties north of Santa Barbara County, and the states of Colorado; Utah; and Nevada except Clark County. Twelfth Naval District bases, shipyards, air stations, hospitals, and manufacturing facilities were essential to winning World War II in the Pacific theater, and remained vibrant military facilities through the 1970s. Twelfth Naval District was disestablished in 1977, and functions were transferred to the Eleventh Naval District.

As part of the post-Cold War military Base Realignment and Closure process in the 1990s, many historic large Pacific U.S. naval facilities such as Mare Island, Treasure Island, Hunters Point Shipyard, and Naval Air Station Alameda in the San Francisco Bay area, and Los Angeles-Long Beach port area of California were closed or re-located to San Diego or to Puget Sound.

Twelfth Coast Guard District operated from 1915 until disestablished on June 30, 1987, during Coast Guard re-alignment. CGD12 area of responsibility for California and western states was transferred to Eleventh Coast Guard District. On July 1, 1987, the Coast Guard consolidated major cutter, aviation, and shore base resources to a new Maintenance and Logistics Command (MLC) for the four remaining districts comprising Coast Guard Pacific Area. As an agency in the U.S. Department of Homeland Security, after 2010 USCG Atlantic (and Pacific) Area MLCs were re-organized. USCG command for maintenance and logistics facilities now falls under one three star vice admiral, who is the Coast Guard Deputy Commandant for Mission Support.

== Thirteenth Naval District ==
Thirteenth Naval District was established on 7 May 1903 with headquarters at the Puget Sound Navy Yard in Bremerton, Washington, in accordance with General Order No. 128, signed by Acting Secretary of the Navy Charles H. Darling. In 1926, Thirteenth District headquarters transferred to Seattle, Washington. The Thirteenth District geographic boundary included the Territory of Alaska until the establishment of the Seventeenth District in April 1944. In 1945, Thirteenth District geographic boundaries included the states of Washington, Oregon, Idaho, Montana, and Wyoming. Thirteenth Naval District bases, shipyards, air stations, hospitals, and manufacturing facilities were essential to winning World War II in the Pacific theater, and remained vibrant military facilities supporting North Pacific and Alaska Naval operations through the 1970s. Thirteenth Naval District was one of six original numbered districts disestablished on 30 September 1980.

All U.S. Navy and Marine Corps facilities, shore bases, and support commands in the northwestern states from the former Thirteenth Naval District, plus Alaska, are now part of Navy Region Northwest, headquartered on Puget Sound at Naval Base Kitsap, WA.

Thirteenth Coast Guard District operates on the northwest Pacific Ocean coast with headquarters on Puget Sound in Seattle WA. Thirteenth District's geographic boundaries include the Pacific coastline and all navigable waters of Oregon, Washington, Idaho, and Montana. Thirteenth Coast Guard District includes two coastal sectors and is homeport for afloat and shore units including major Pacific patrol cutters, polar icebreakers, buoy tenders, homeland security boats, stations, shore bases, deployable maritime security units, and three Coast Guard air stations.

== Fourteenth Naval District ==
Fourteenth Naval District established in 1916, was headquartered at Pearl Harbor, Hawaii. From 1899 when the U.S. Navy established bases in Hawaii until the Japanese Empire attacked Pearl Harbor on 7 December 1941, the United States Pacific Fleet grew enormously. By 1945, Fourteenth Naval District boundaries included the geographic areas of the Hawaiian Islands, and islands to westward, including Midway, Wake, Kure, and Johnston, and Kingman Reef. Fourteenth Naval District bases, shipyards, submarines, air stations, and hospital facilities were essential to winning World War II in the Pacific theater, and remained vibrant military facilities supporting Pacific naval operations through the 1970s. Fourteenth Naval District was disestablished on 30 June 1979, and command of the U.S. Navy Pacific area of responsibility was transferred to Commander, U.S. Pacific Fleet. Pacific Fleet headquarters is now at Joint Base Pearl Harbor–Hickam, Hawaii.

Fourteenth Coast Guard District command is headquartered in Honolulu HI. CCGD14 comprises all waters around Hawaii, Guam, and U.S. territory islands in the Pacific Ocean. Fourteenth District's geographic boundaries cover a wide portion of the central Pacific Ocean.

Fourteenth Coast Guard District includes two coastal sectors in Hawaii and Guam, and is homeport for afloat and shore units including major patrol cutters that deploy to the South Pacific and east Asia, buoy tenders, homeland security boats, stations, shore bases, deployable maritime security units, and Coast Guard air stations.

== Fifteenth Naval District ==
Fifteenth Naval District encompassed the Panama Canal Zone, headquartered at Balboa, Panama, and was established on 28 November 1917 by an executive order dated 27 August 1917. After Panama Canal construction was completed in 1914 and the Canal opened to ship traffic between the oceans, Fifteenth Naval District boundaties included "the waters adjacent to the Panama Canal Zone exclusive of the area between the inner limits of the defensive sea areas established at the Atlantic Ocean Entrance and the Pacific Ocean Entrance of the Panama Canal". For most of the 20th Century, including two world wars, the U.S. military oversaw ship transit operations from ocean to ocean through the Panama Canal Zone.

On 31 December 1975, Fifteenth Naval District was disestablished. It responsibilities were handed over to the U.S. Naval Station Panama Canal, often known as Rodman Naval Station.

Under President Jimmy Carter's administration, the Panama Canal Zone was disestablished in 1979. In 1999, the United States closed military facilities in Panama and transferred control of bases and the Panama Canal to the government of Panama.

== Sixteenth Naval District ==
Sixteenth Naval District comprised the entire Philippine Islands before 1941. The Philippines was a colony of the United States from 1898 to 1946. The former United States Asiatic Fleet patrolled the many isolated islands in the Philippine Sea, South China Sea, and Celebes Sea area. From December 1941 U.S. Naval Bases in the Philippines Sixteenth Naval District were taken and controlled by the Empire of Japan until they were regained by U.S. military forces as World War II ended in 1945.

From 1945 until 1992, this part of the southwest Pacific region was called U.S. Naval Base Philippines, consisting of a number of naval stations located on the many islands in the Philippines, including the large Naval Base Subic Bay ship repair facility. Most of these bases were shore support facilities built during World War II by Navy Seabee Construction Battalions as U.S. forces regained control of the islands from the Japanese Empire.

In 1992 the United States returned all naval bases to the Philippine Navy, as well as closing other U.S. military facilities in the Philippines, including the large Clark Air Force Base. U.S. Navy operations in the Philippines area are now supported by one of the Navy Regions in the western Pacific, such as Navy Region Center Singapore.

In 2022 amid growing tensions with China, the United States and Philippine governments quietly began preparations for U.S. forces to return to the Subic Bay naval facility.

== Seventeenth Naval District ==
Seventeenth Naval District was established on 15 April 1944, headquartered at Kodiak Island, Alaska for command of northern Pacific naval operations during World War II. Starting in 1942, the Alaska territory and Aleutian Islands played a major role in the U.S. military effort to drive back and defeat the Japanese empire. Japanese attacks during the Aleutian Islands campaign on Dutch Harbor in 1942, and Attu and Kiska in 1943 were the only battles of World War II fought on American soil. In 1944, President Franklin Roosevelt visited Adak Island air base, meeting with military commanders and eating with soldiers of the Aleutians garrison. In 1945, Seventeenth District encompassed the very large geographic area of Alaska, and the entire Aleutian Islands. Three decades and many naval operations later, Seventeenth Naval District was disestablished on 30 June 1971, after which the U.S. Coast Guard gradually took over Kodiak naval base. By 1997 other aging WWII naval installations in Alaska, such as Adak Naval Air Station, were closed.

U.S. Navy and Marine Corps operations in the former Seventeenth Naval District of Alaska are now supported by Navy Region Northwest, headquartered on Puget Sound at Naval Base Kitsap, WA. In 2021, the Navy began considering re-opening Adak Air Station due to heightened global power competition with Russia and China.

Seventeenth Coast Guard District headquartered in Juneau AK, includes the vast waters of Alaska from Canada north and west to the Arctic Ocean, Chukchi Sea, Bering Sea, Gulf of Alaska, and Aleutian Islands. Seventeenth Coast Guard District maintains a large USCG air and sea base on Kodiak Island, AK and operates within geographic boundaries that cover a wide distance of waters from the stormy North Pacific Ocean to polar ice between Canada and Asia. Seventeenth Coast Guard District includes two coastal sectors in Anchorage and Juneau, and is homeport for afloat and shore units including major patrol cutters that deploy for fisheries law enforcement across the North Pacific and Bering Sea, buoy tenders, homeland security boats, stations, shore bases, two major Coast Guard air stations and an air support facility.

== Eighteenth, Nineteenth, and Twentieth Naval Districts ==
District numbers 18, 19, and 20 were reserved for future use by the United States Navy district plan, but between 1903 and 1991 were never assigned to specified naval forces and shore installations in any geographic region of the world.

Post-Cold War District Reorganization: During the 1990s, U.S. Navy shore installation echelon systems were significantly reduced for government efficiency. Numbered naval district commands were completely discontinued by the U.S. Navy. The remaining 11 naval districts were renamed by regional geography, and have operated since 1999 as U.S. Navy Regions. Five of the current U.S. Navy overseas flag commands that support naval force installations in Japan, Korea, Europe, Singapore, and the Pacific Marianas Islands including the territory of Guam were established after the numbered naval district system was reorganized as eleven geographic regions.

== Naval District Washington ==
Naval District Washington is one of eleven current U.S. Navy commands re-organized as Regions in 1999, but NDW retained the naval district name. NDW operates and manages Naval shore installations in the Washington D.C. Metropolitan Area. Naval District Washington headquarters is located next to Commander, Navy Installations Command HQ in the historic Washington Navy Yard on the Anacostia River in southeast DC. The NDW Commandant is a Navy rear admiral who leads the oldest district that remains from the original 1903 Naval District system.

Naval District Washington is a U.S. Navy asset in the National Capitol Region military district Joint Force Headquarters. JFHQ-NCR is responsible for homeland defense of the greater Washington, DC National Capital Region, including The Pentagon, Headquarters Marine Corps, U.S. Coast Guard HQ, and all U.S. military facilities in the area.

== U.S. Coast Guard District organization ==
Since the modern USCG was formed by the Coast Guard Act in 1915, USCG cutters, boats, aircraft, and shore forces have operated using a revised version of the original 1903 numbered naval district map. The former Coast Guard East and West Areas were renamed CG Atlantic Area and CG Pacific Area in the 1960s, with each Area command led by a USCG three star vice admiral. By 1987 the number of Coast Guard districts was reduced from 13 to 10 through several district mergers and many boundary line adjustments.

When the Cold War ended in 1991, all U.S. military services down-sized force organizations, consolidated, and realigned bases. On 30 May 1996, Coast Guard Eighth District (Gulf of Mexico), and CG Second District (Mississippi & Ohio western river system) were combined to form the enlarged new Eighth Coast Guard District, leaving the Coast Guard organizational map with the current nine geographic districts.

The two USCG Atlantic and Pacific Area Commanders are operationally responsible to the Commandant of the Coast Guard, the U.S. armed forces Joint Chiefs of Staff, and the Secretary of Homeland Security for coastal defense and the maritime security of the United States homeland.

U.S. Coast Guard District Commanders report to the two Area Commanders for homeland defense, and lead the training operations of part-time Coast Guard Reserve component forces, as well as U.S. Navy Reserve training units assigned to coastal security duties in USCG Sectors.

District Commanders also lead U.S. Coast Guard Auxiliary uniformed service volunteers organized in local civilian boat flotillas, who perform safety assistance patrols in each USCG naval district geography. The Coast Guard Auxiliary District map adds sixteen sub-regions, aligned with USCG Sectors, that administratively support the U.S. recreational boating safety public outreach activities of thousands of CG Auxiliarists.

USCG Districts have retained the original number designation as first assigned in the 1903 naval district plan.

District number designations and Commander, Coast Guard District headquarters locations are:

- First Coast Guard District
- Fifth Coast Guard District
- Seventh Coast Guard District
- Eighth Coast Guard District
- Ninth Coast Guard District
- Eleventh Coast Guard District
- Thirteenth Coast Guard District
- Fourteenth Coast Guard District
- Seventeenth Coast Guard District
