= Task Force 73 =

Task Force 73 Commander, Logistics Group Western Pacific Singapore Area Commander
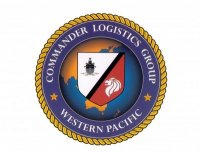
- Logo of Commander, Logistics Group Western Pacific
- Active: 1945–present 1992–present (with addition of CLWP title)
- Country: United States
- Branch: United States Navy
- Type: Command
- Role: Support of all Naval Forces in Singapore
- Part of: United States Seventh Fleet (itself a part of the United States Pacific Fleet); Naval Installations Command
- Garrison/HQ: Port of Singapore Authority Sembawang Terminal, Singapore
- Nickname(s): CLWP

Commanders
- Current commander: CAPT Silas L. Bouyer II
- Notable commanders: RADM Nora W. Tyson

Task Force 73/Commander, Logistics Group Western Pacific (CTF 73/CLWP) is a U.S. Navy task force of the United States Seventh Fleet that is based in Singapore. CTF 73/CLWP is the U.S. 7th Fleet's provider of combat-ready logistics, maintaining and operating government-owned ships and operating government-contracted vessels to sustain combatant ships and units throughout the U.S. 7th Fleet area of operations. CTF 73/CLWP also acts as the Navy Region commander for naval activities in Singapore, with its only subordinate command being the U.S. Navy Region Center Singapore.

CTF 73/CLWP is the U.S. 7th Fleet's Theater Security Cooperation agent for South and Southeast Asia, providing persistent engagement with allies and partners across the region through established exercises while forging new maritime partnerships through tailored exchanges, enhanced port visits and expanding repair capabilities at regional shipyards. CTF 73 is headquartered at the Port of Singapore Authority Sembawang Terminal, Singapore, and is commanded by Captain Silas L. Bouyer II.

== History ==
After the end of the Second World War, the United States Seventh Fleet moved its headquarters to Qingdao, China. As laid out in Operation Plan 13–45 of 26 August 1945, Admiral Kinkaid established five major task forces to manage operations in the Western Pacific: one was Task Force 73, the Yangtze Patrol Force, with 75 combatants. Later known as Commander, Naval Surface Group Western Pacific (Commander Task Force (CTF) 73/CTF 75), the task force's mission included command readiness, administrative oversight and control of the Naval Surface Force, United States Pacific Fleet ships assigned in Japan, Guam and the Philippines.

As CTF 75, the command also maintained operational control of approximately 30 other ships operating in the Western Pacific, Indian Ocean and North Arabian Sea. The command was originally based at Subic Bay in the Philippines but was transferred to Singapore with the withdrawal of US Military forces in the 1990s.

A Memorandum of Understanding (MOU) was signed between Singapore and the United States in 1990 and discussions of the relocation were done by 1992. Unlike other overseas US military bases, there is no official US "Naval Base" in Singapore but is rather ambiguously called a military "place" – largely due to political reasons such Singapore's status as a neutral country. However, US ships nevertheless often make port calls to Singapore for maintenance, repairs, supplies, and recreation, among other purposes.

In addition to its logistics tasks, TF 73 also provides industrial voyage repairs to U.S. Navy ships and craft through contracted commercial repair capabilities throughout Southeast Asia, Korea, India, Australia, Hong Kong and Oceania. It is also the 7th Fleet agent for diving, salvage, towing and major oil spill response. In its capacity as the bilateral exercise coordinator for Southeast Asia, it conducts planning, coordination of training exercises with Brunei, Cambodia, Indonesia, Malaysia, Thailand, the Philippines and Singapore.

In 2011, its commander, Rear Admiral (Lower Half) Ron Horton, was relieved of his post due to being "derelict in the performance of his duties". Horton was the commanding officer of the USS Enterprise during the period when inappropriate videos were produced and aired between May and December 2007. He was replaced by Rear Adm. Thomas F. Carney.

== See also ==
- Cooperation Afloat Readiness and Training
