= Cooperation Afloat Readiness and Training =

Series of bilateral naval exercises

- CARAT; Part of United States Pacific Fleet
- Location: Southeast Asia
- Goals: military cooperation
- Status: annual bilateral military exercises

Parties
United States Navy	Navies of ASEAN participants

The Cooperation Afloat Readiness and Training (CARAT) is a series of annual bilateral military exercises conducted by the United States Pacific Fleet, with several member nations of ASEAN in Southeast Asia. Currently, the navies of Bangladesh, Brunei Darussalam, Cambodia, Indonesia, Malaysia, Philippines, Singapore, Sri Lanka, and Thailand participate. Objectives of CARAT include enhancing regional cooperation; building friendships, and strengthening professional skills. In 2010, Cambodia and Bangladesh became the first CARAT participants to join the exercise since 1995.

== CARAT 2011 ==
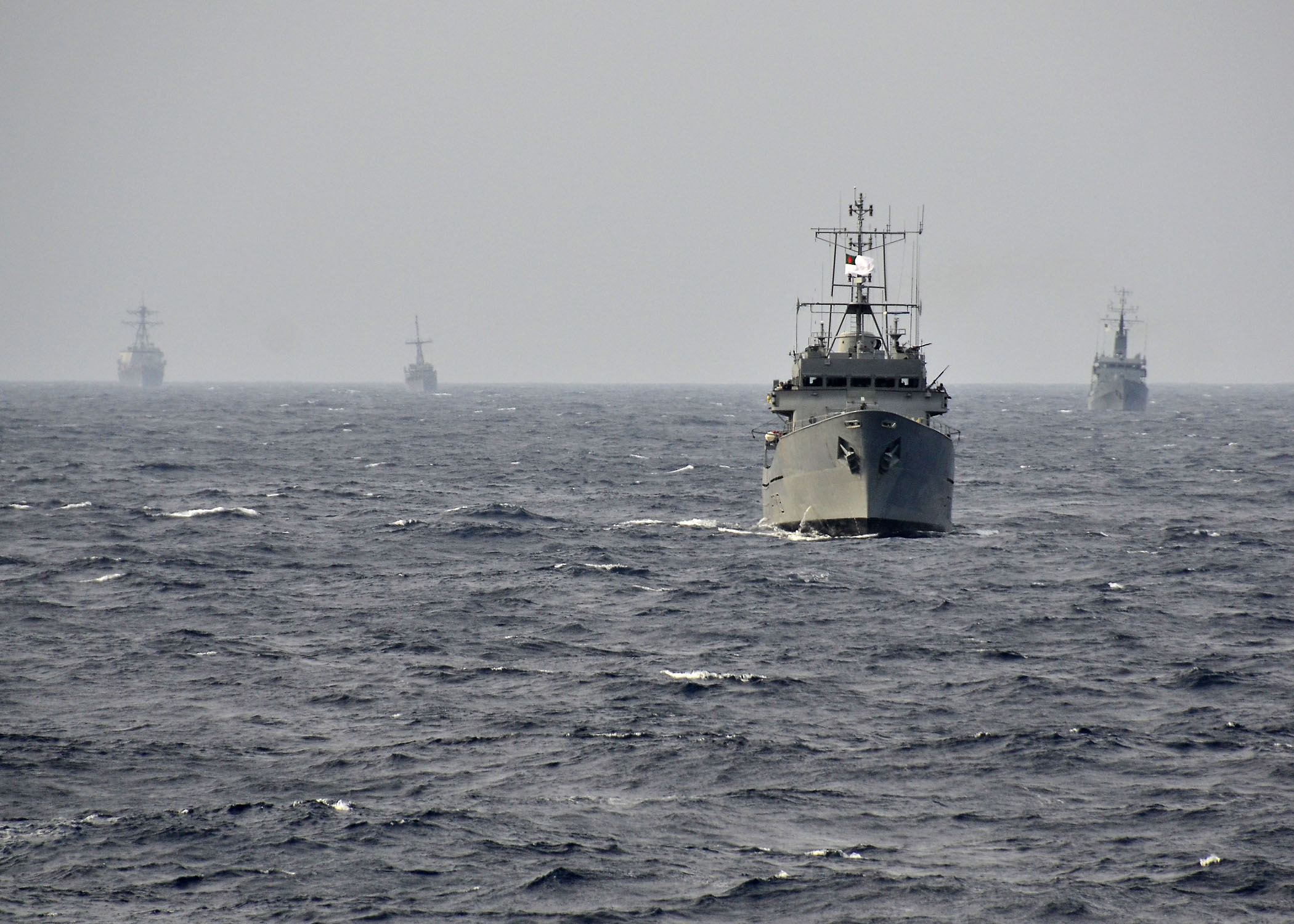
CARAT Bangladesh 2011 (22 Sep. 2011).

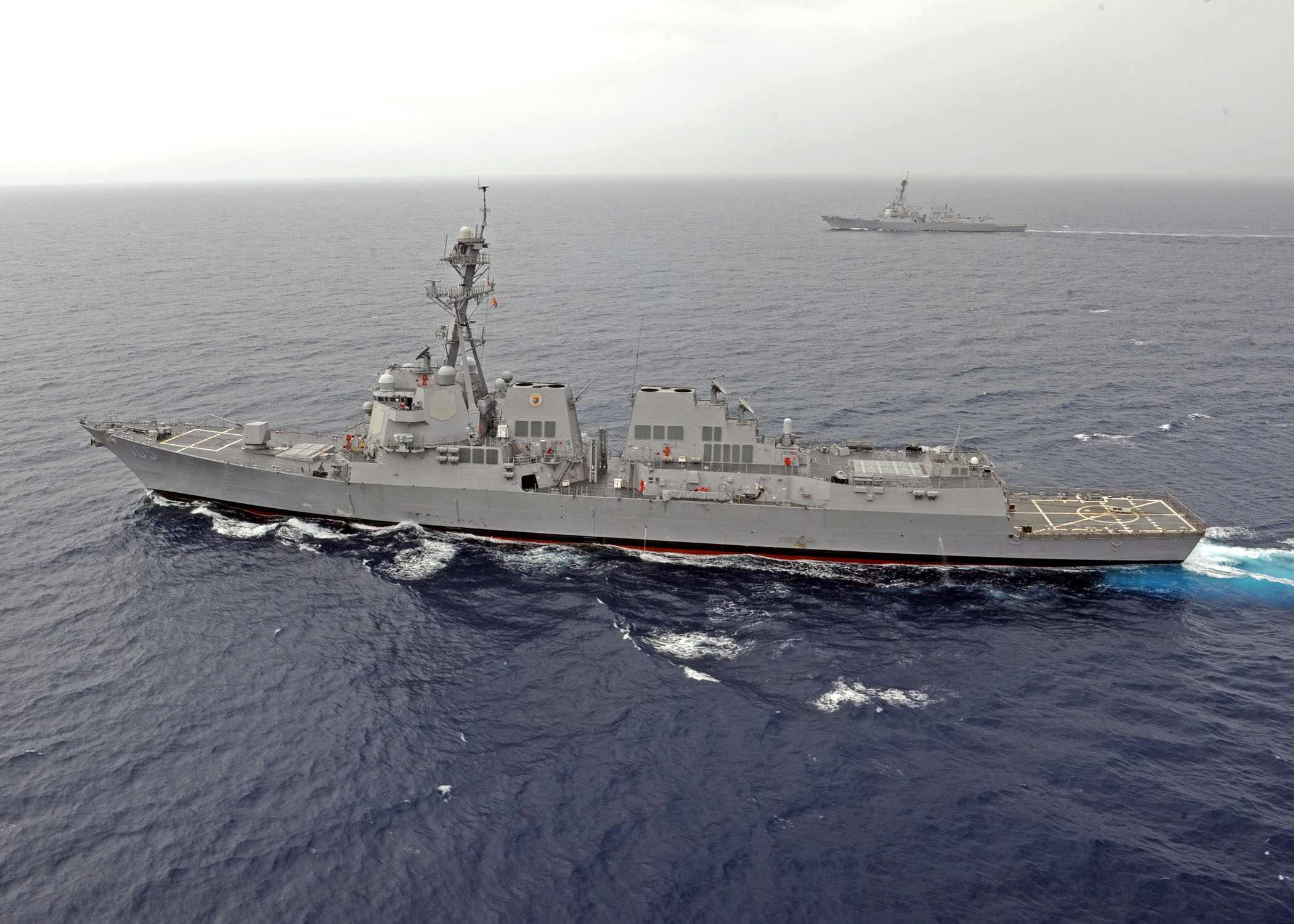
CARAT Brunei 2011 (5 Oct. 2011).

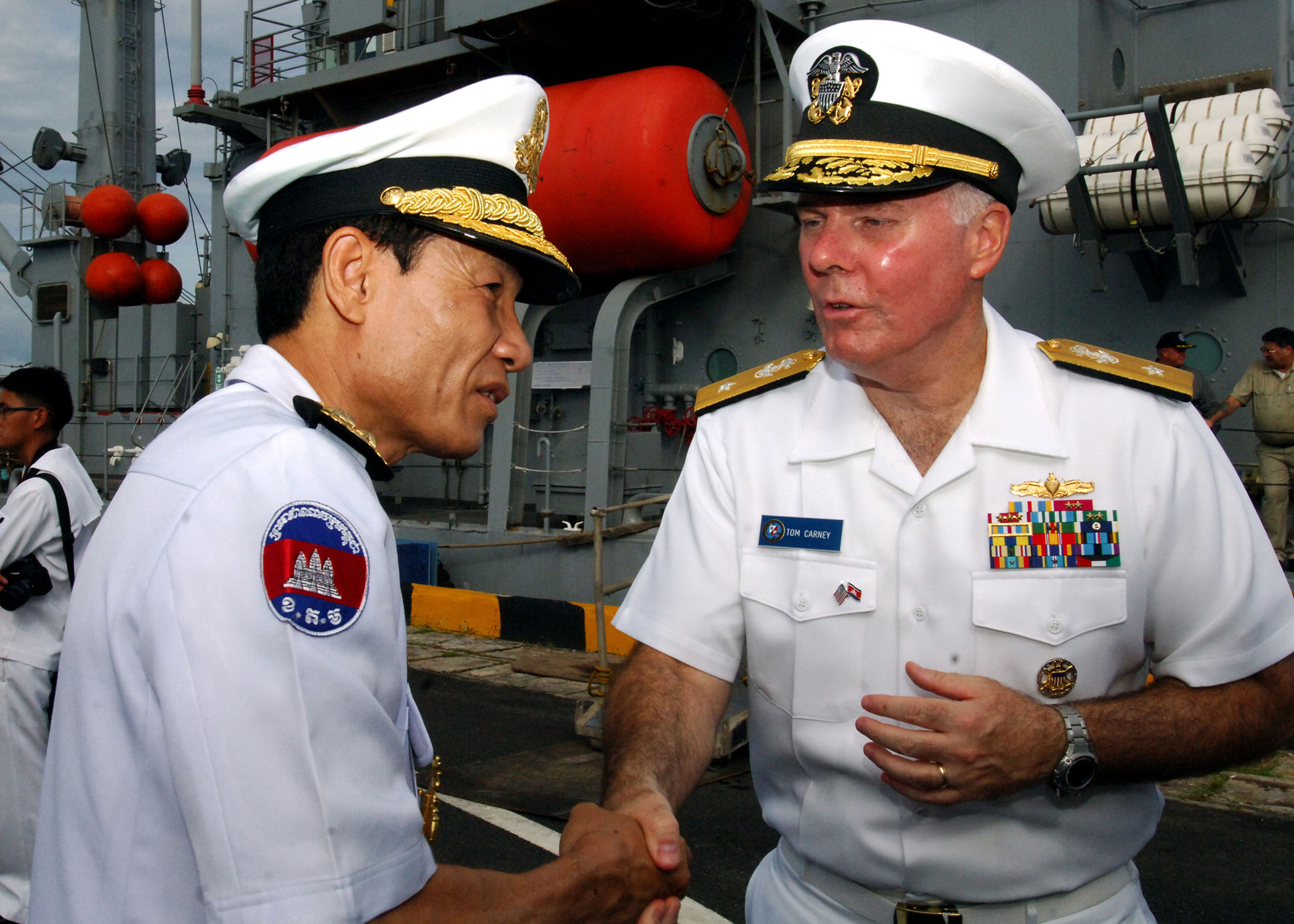
CARAT Cambodia 2011 (20 Oct. 2011).

The objective of CARAT 2011 was to enhance regional naval cooperation by strengthening the professional skills of its participants. Task Force 73 served as the U.S. Navy executive agent for the CARAT 2011 exercises.

=== CARAT 2011 Bangladesh ===
The U.S. Navy's guided-missile destroyer USS Kidd, the guided-missile frigate USS Ford, the mine counter-measures ship USS Defender, and the salvage ship USNS Safeguard participated in the first-ever CARAT Bangladesh bilateral exercise, which began on 18 September 2011 at the Bangladesh naval base at Issa Khan. Task Force 73 commander (CTF-73) Rear Admiral Tom Carney noted:

The fact that CARAT attracts navies from the region is a particularly important point. I look at 2011 as the first of many successful years of engagement between the U.S. and Bangladesh Navies.

CARAT Bangladesh combined training events ashore and at sea, with shore events focused on dive training, riverine warfare, ship boarding training, and medical and community service projects. At-sea training operations included helicopter operations, shipboard communications and maneuvering drills, surface gunnery exercises, and tactical freeplay events.

=== CARAT 2011 Cambodia ===
The U.S. destroyer Kidd and salvage ship Safeguard subsequently participated in the 2nd annual CARAT Cambodia bilateral exercise which began on 20 October 2011 with opening ceremonies in Sihanoukville. TF-73 commander Admiral Carney (pictured) added:

Last year marked an important step forward in the relationships between the U.S. and Cambodian Navies. This year, for the first time, a ship from the U.S. Navy, one of our newest destroyers, will be getting underway with Royal Cambodian Navy ships for a series of at-sea events.

The week-long CARAT Cambodia exercises included training exchanges and community activities ashore and such at-sea operations as communication drills, division tactics, and surface gunfire drills.

=== CARAT 2011 Brunei ===
The guided-missile destroyers USS Pinckney and USS Dewey joined the U.S. Navy land-based patrol squadron VP-40 for the 17th annual CARAT Brunei exercises which began on 30 September 2011 in opening ceremonies held at the Muara Naval Base. CTF-73 Admiral Carney observed:

This is a key year for our exercise, as it marks the first time in two years both the U.S. and Royal Brunei Navies are returning to sea together. Improving cooperation and advancing interoperability at sea is the cornerstone of CARAT, and we have a short but ambitious schedule of underway events planned.

The eight-day exercise included training exchanges ashore on maritime domain awareness, search-and-rescue, fire fighting and damage control, vessel boarding procedures, and various maritime symposia. U.S. Marines joined Bruneian Land Forces for urban operations and first aid training. At-sea operations included joint helicopter operations, search and rescue practical scenarios, division tactics, and surface gunfire drills.

== CARAT 2012 ==
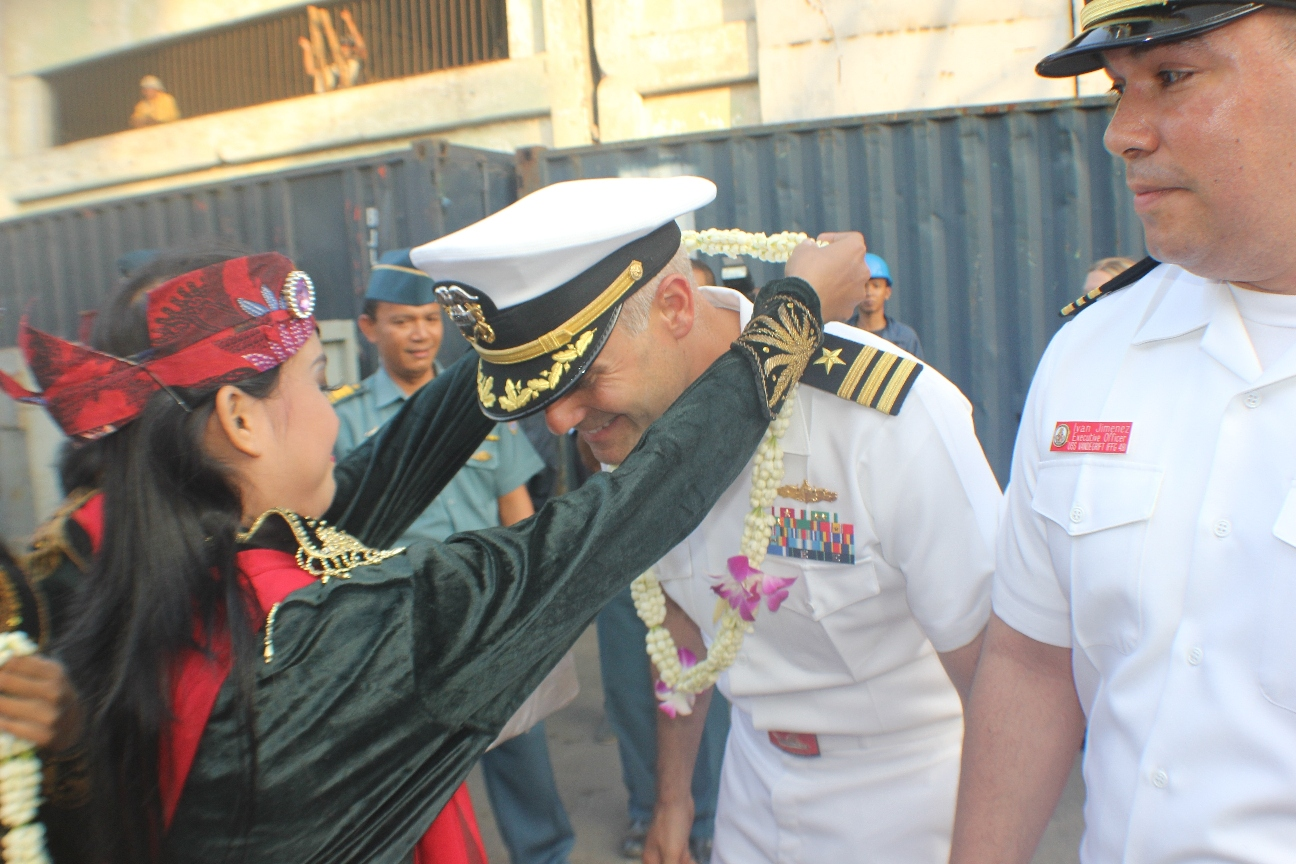
USS Vandegrift's Commanding Officer CDR Brandon Bryan is greeted by Rainbow Dancers.

CARAT 2012 was the latest in an ongoing series of annual bilateral military exercises conducted by U.S. Pacific Fleet with several member nations of ASEAN in Southeast Asia. The navies of Bangladesh, Brunei, Cambodia, Indonesia, Malaysia, Philippines, Singapore, and Thailand participated in CARAT 2012. The objective of CARAT 2012 was to enhance regional naval cooperation by strengthening the professional skills of its participants. Task Force 73 served as the U.S. Navy executive agent for the CARAT 2012 exercises.

=== CARAT 2012 Indonesia ===
In CARAT 2012, at least three vessels arrived in the Port of Tanjung Perak, Surabaya, Indonesia. The ships which arrived at Surabaya were USS Germantown, USS Vandegrift, USCGC Waesche, and USNS Safeguard.

== See also ==
- Task Force 73/Commander, Logistics Group Western Pacific
