= Navy Region Center Singapore =

One of eleven naval regions of the U.S. Navy

The Navy Region Centre Singapore (NRCS) is a United States military installation in Admiralty, Sembawang, Singapore, that manages shore support facilities. It does so for departments such as the Department of the Navy (DoN) and Department of Defense (DoD). The centre manages facilities such as administration, Housing, Morale, welfare, family support services and recreation programs.

According to the NRCS Commanding Officer Capt. Scott Murdock (in 2016)“A major part of our mission is taking care of the fleet." Whenever U.S Navy vessels arrive at the port, NRCS and supporting departments like NAVSUP Fleet Logistics Centre Yokosuka, Site Singapore (FLC), Family Readiness Group, Morale, Welfare and Recreation, Navy Exchange, and Navy Federal Credit Union are responsible for supporting the fleet and provide services such as provisions, fuel, postal services, and pier-side support.

== Support ==
The NRCS also supports various other wings such as-

- Logistics Group Western Pacific (COMLOGWESTPAC)
- Military Sealift Command Far East (SEALOGFE)
- Military Sealift Fleet Support Command Ship Support Unit Singapore (MSFSC SSU)
- Naval Criminal Investigative Service
- Fleet Industrial Support Center
- Detachment Singapore (FISC)
- United States Coast Guard Detachment Singapore
- Defense Contract Management Agency
- 497th Combat Training Flight
- Air Mobility Squadron Detachment 2

== Facilities ==
The NRCS contains some facilities which are accessible to U.S Navy personnel. Some of them are sports facilities, which include baseball fields and scheduled softball matches against other navy departments.

The centre also has the Café Lah Community Center, which contains a coffee shop as well as a theater.

Along the walkway of the headquarters, a barber shop, several souvenir shops are also present.

== Safety and Environmental Fair ==
In 2016 the NRCS held its Safety and Environmental Fair. The event drew more than 150 visitors and included representatives of the region's medical staff, Child and Youth Programs, Morale, Welfare and Recreation, Public Health Department, Fleet and Family Readiness Group, the Public Safety Department and the Environmental Department. The event is held to promote safety and environmental awareness. It also seeks to educate people about different safety topics and activities such as driving safety, fire extinguishing techniques, Cardiopulmonary resuscitation (CPR), food safety and dental hygiene.
