= Kings of South Beach =

- DVD cover
- Written by: Nicholas Pileggi
- Directed by: Tim Hunter
- Starring: Donnie Wahlberg; Jason Gedrick
- Music by: Rob Mounsey
- Country of origin: United States
- Original language: English

Production
- Executive producers: Sonny Grosso; Larry Jacobson; Clay Kahler; Van Vandegrift
- Producers: Nicholas Pileggi; Kip Konwiser
- Cinematography: Patrick Cady
- Editor: Sunny Hodge
- Running time: 90 minutes
- Production companies: Grosso-Jacobson Communications; Sony Pictures Television

Original release
- Network: A&E
- Release: March 12, 2007

Kings of South Beach is a 2007 American crime drama television film directed by Tim Hunter and written by Nicholas Pileggi, about an infamous operator of nightclubs in the South Beach section of Miami Beach, Florida. The lead character is portrayed by Jason Gedrick; his best friend is portrayed by Donnie Wahlberg. The film premiered on March 12, 2007 on A&E.

== Background ==
The film is loosely based on a true story about the exploits of Chris Paciello, a transplanted New Yorker who was involved with the Mafia back in his hometown. He built a house of cards in South Beach, founded on models, money, and celebrity friends, including Madonna.

After an intense undercover investigation, Paciello was arrested on racketeering and murder charges, and went on to testify against known members and associates of the Colombo and Bonanno crime families.

== Cast ==
- Donnie Wahlberg as Andy Burnett
- Jason Gedrick as Chris Troiano
- Ricardo Antonio Chavira as Enrique
- Brian Goodman as Lt. Jim Hawke
- Frank John Hughes as Lt. Houlton
- Steven Bauer as Allie Boy
- Sean Poolman as Manny Jones
- Nadine Velazquez as Olivia Palacios
- Ariane Sommer as Girl at the Bar

== Production ==
Filming took place entirely in Puerto Rico in 2006. The production received a 40% tax rebate from the Puerto Rico Film Commission.

== Reception ==
New York Post critic Linda Stasi rates Kings of South Beach as a "four star film" with a casting described as “perfect.” Robert Bianco of USA Today describes "Gedrick and Wahlberg as absolutely first-rate, as these fine actors tend to be." Scott Weinberg of DVD Talk-Review, however, called it "obvious, listless, and completely predictable from start to finish", and said that "Kings of South Beach is little more than a very thin retread of several much better crime stories."
