= Vandergrift =

Vandergrift is a name. It may refer to:

== Places ==
- East Vandergrift, Pennsylvania, a borough in Westmoreland County
- North Vandergrift, Pennsylvania, a borough in Armstrong County
- North Vandergrift-Pleasant View, Pennsylvania, a borough in Armstrong County
- Vandergrift Historic District, a national historic district in Westmoreland County, Pennsylvania
- Vandergrift, Pennsylvania, a borough in Westmoreland County
- Vandergrift Pioneers, a minor league baseball team

== See also ==
Vandegrift (disambiguation)
