= Van Vandegrift =

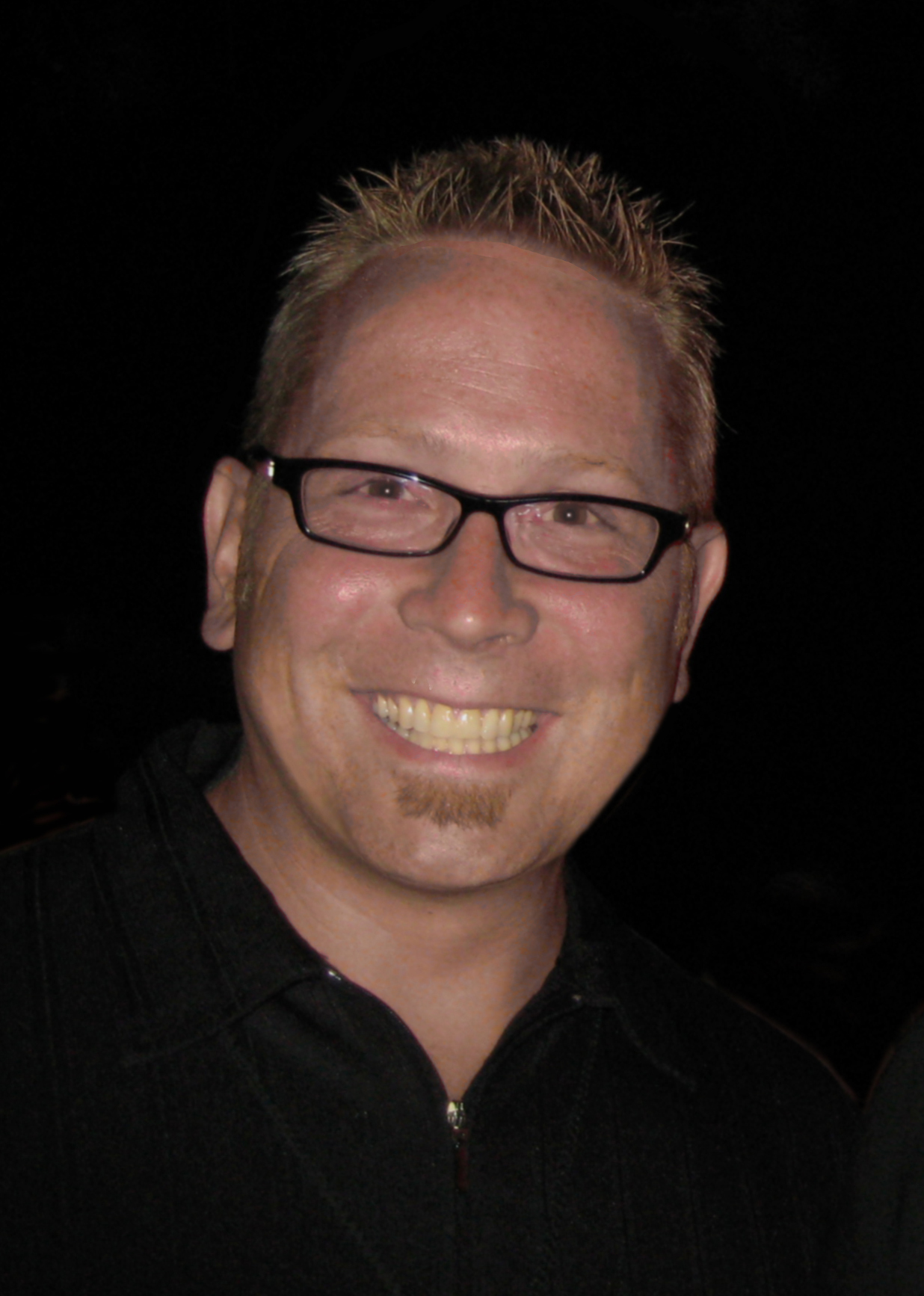
- Vandegrift at the 2008 premiere of The Mummy: Tomb of the Dragon Emperor
- Born: February 13, 1969 (age 57); Huntsville, Alabama, United States
- Education: M.S., Mechanical Engineering, University of Alabama, Huntsville (NASA Campus), 1996; B.S., Aerospace Engineering, Texas A&M, 1990
- Occupation: Producer

Van Vandegrift (born February 13, 1969) is an American film and television producer and entrepreneur, known for his work on films such as Get Smart and Journey to the Center of the Earth, and for television projects, including Kings of South Beach.

== Early life ==
Vandegrift was born in Huntsville, Alabama, where his parents worked at NASA's Marshall Space Flight Center. In 1985, he received a scholarship to the nearby Texas A&M University where he enrolled in the Department of Aerospace Engineering, and graduated from it in 1990. In 1988, he was selected by NASA to participate in its undergraduate cooperative education program, and began working in Mission Control at the Lyndon B. Johnson Space Center.

Following graduation, Vandegrift attended the International Space University in Toronto, Ontario, Canada in 1990. He received a NASA post-graduate fellowship at the Marshall Space Flight Center Alabama Space Grant Consortium, where he designed and built experiments and computer hardware that flew into space aboard NASA Consort Rockets and the Space Shuttle. He earned a Master of Science degree.

Vandegrift was commissioned as an ensign in the U.S. Naval Reserve in 1992. After his promotion to lieutenant in 1994, Vandegrift became a naval intelligence officer serving with United States Navy SEALs aboard the USS Whirlwind, the USS Cole, and the aircraft carrier USS George Washington.

== Career ==
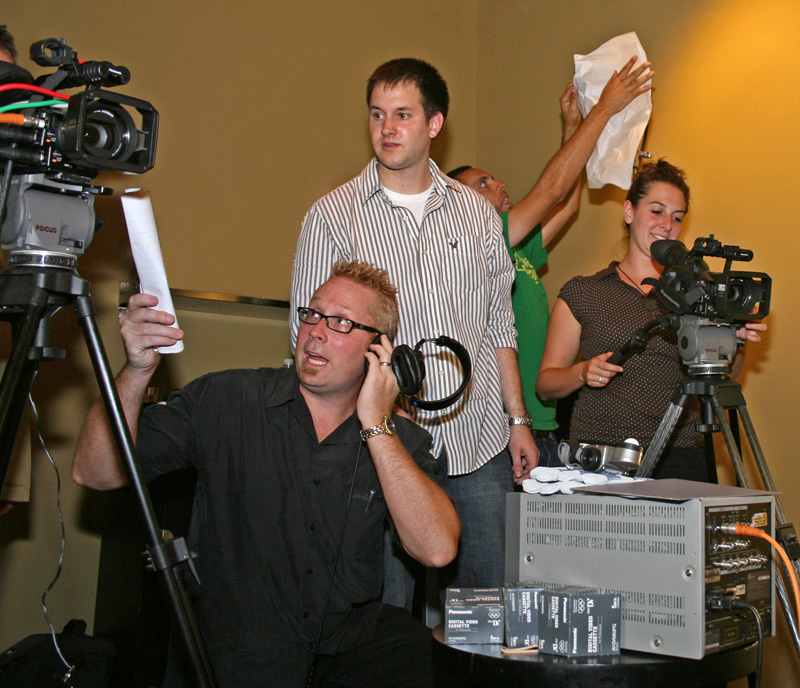
Van Vandegrift with Matrixx crew

While still in graduate school in 1994, Vandegrift helped form TAC Systems, an early technology pioneer of CD-ROMs and video games, and was elected to its board of directors. In 1996, he joined TAC full-time as its president, working closely with the investor group, and helped bring about its successful sale in 1997. Vandegrift was then recruited as the Marketing Senior Executive for the Digital Equipment Corporation (DEC) outside Boston, Massachusetts. In 1999, DEC was acquired by Compaq Computer Corporation for $9.6 billion. Using personal proceeds from the TAC and DEC acquisitions, Vandegrift formed a venture capital firm in 1998 called whodoweknow.com.

In 1999, Vandegrift moved to Chicago and became the first outside member of the board of directors for WebPromote. Vandegrift hired the CEO and management team and led a $10 million venture capital round with other notable investors, including Andrew "Flip" Filipowski. Vandegrift formed "matrixx" in 2000 as a broadband entertainment and production company and began meeting with major studio and record label executives. While at the Toronto International Film Festival, the attacks of September 11, 2001 unfolded. Vandegrift was recalled to active duty as a Naval Intelligence Officer and was deployed on a classified mission for Operation Enduring Freedom. Following that mission, he was discharged in 2002. Vandegrift then moved to Santa Monica, California, where, through his relationships with Creative Artists Agency, he formed a strategic partnership with Grosso Jacobson Communications, a Hollywood production company formed by Sonny Grosso.
