= USS Vandegrift =

Oliver Hazard Perry-class frigate

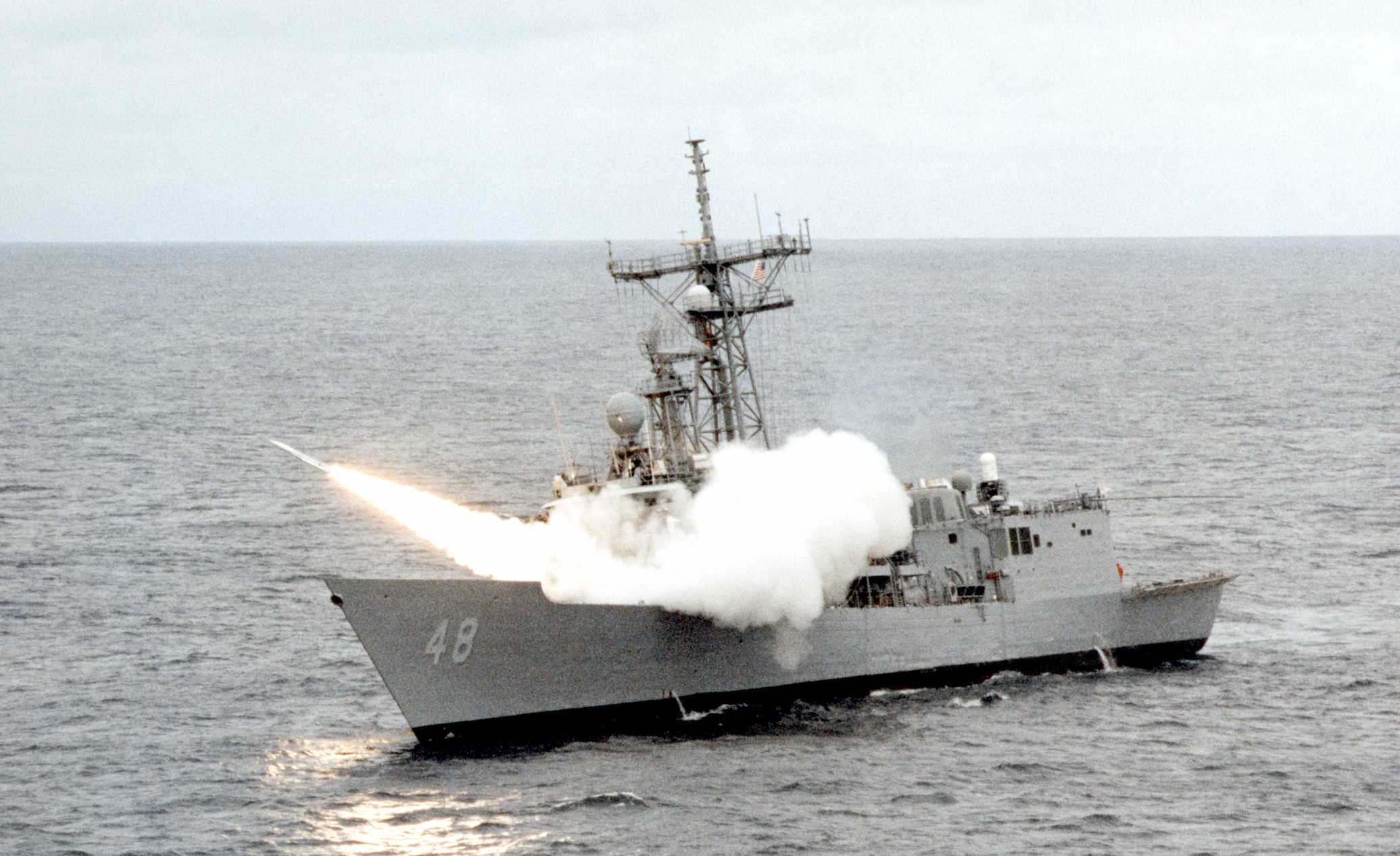
- USS Vandegrift (FFG-48) launching a missile, 15 March 1996.

History

United States
- Namesake: General Alexander A. Vandegrift
- Awarded: 28 April 1980
- Builder: Todd Pacific Shipyards, Seattle, Washington
- Laid down: 13 October 1981
- Launched: 15 October 1982
- Sponsored by: Ms. Serina N. S. Vandegrift; Ms. Courtney A. Vandegrift; Ms. Stephanie S. Vandegrift; Ms. Daphne L. Vandegrift
- Commissioned: 24 November 1984
- Decommissioned: 19 February 2015
- Stricken: 31 March 2015
- Identification: Hull symbol: FFG-48; Code letters: NAAV
- Motto: Exercitatus, Conservatus, Paratus ("Trained, Guarded, Ready")
- Nickname(s): Vandy
- Fate: Sunk as target 17 June 2022
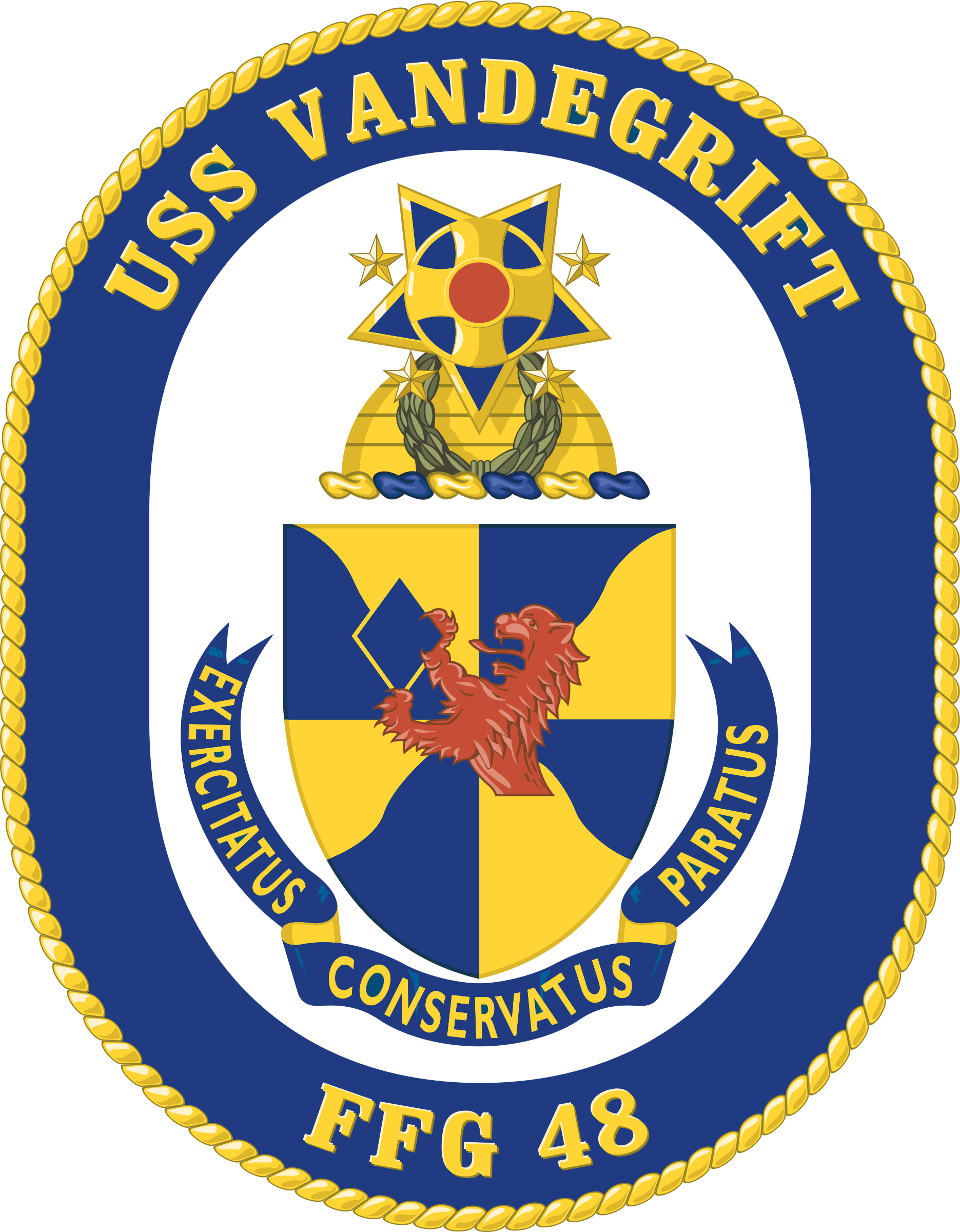
- Badge

General characteristics
- Class & type: Oliver Hazard Perry-class frigate
- Displacement: 4,100 long tons (4,200 t), full load
- Length: 453 feet (138 m), overall
- Beam: 45 feet (14 m)
- Draught: 22 feet (6.7 m)
- Propulsion: 2 × General Electric LM2500-30 gas turbines generating 41,000 shp (31 MW) through a single shaft and variable pitch propeller; 2 × Auxiliary Propulsion Units, 350 hp (260 kW) retractable electric azimuth thrusters for maneuvering and docking.
- Speed: over 29 knots (54 km/h)
- Range: 5,000 nautical miles at 18 knots (9,300 km at 33 km/h)
- Complement: 15 officers and 190 enlisted, plus SH-60 LAMPS detachment of roughly six officer pilots and 15 enlisted maintainers
- Sensors & processing systems: AN/SPS-49 air-search radar; AN/SPS-55 surface-search radar; CAS and STIR fire-control radar; AN/SQS-56 sonar.
- Electronic warfare & decoys: AN/SLQ-32
- Armament: As built: 1 × OTO Melara Mk 75 76 mm/62 caliber naval gun; 2 × Mk 32 triple-tube (324 mm) launchers for Mark 46 torpedoes; 1 × Vulcan Phalanx CIWS; 4 × .50-cal (12.7 mm) machine guns.; 1 × Mk 13 Mod 4 single-arm launcher for Harpoon anti-ship missiles and SM-1MR Standard anti-ship/air missiles (40 round magazine); Note: As of 2004, Mk 13 systems removed from all active US vessels of this class.
- Aircraft carried: 2 × SH-60 LAMPS III helicopters
- Aviation facilities: 2 × hangars; RAST helicopter hauldown system

USS Vandegrift (FFG-48) was an Oliver Hazard Perry-class frigate of the United States Navy. The ship was named for General Alexander A. Vandegrift (1887–1973), 18th Commandant of the Marine Corps.

Vandegrift was laid down on 13 October 1981 at Todd Pacific Shipyards, Seattle, Washington. She was launched on 15 October 1982 – cosponsored by Ms. Courtney A. Vandegrift, Ms. Stephanie S. Vandegrift, and Ms. Daphne L. Vandegrift, three of the late Gen. Vandegrift’s granddaughters, and Ms. Serina N. S. Vandegrift, his great granddaughter. Vandegrift was commissioned on 24 November 1984 and, after over 30 years of service, decommissioned on 19 February 2015.

== 1980s ==
The ship's inaugural cruise began on 5 January 1987. During the course of this around-the-world cruise, she sailed three oceans, seven seas and visited four continents. The plank owners also crossed the International Date Line, Equator, Greenwich Meridian, and sailed through the Strait of Gibraltar, and the Suez and Panama Canals. Vandegrift conducted operations with USS Kitty Hawk in the Arabian Sea and Indian Ocean. These operations were highlighted by an air and sea power demonstration for president Muhammad Zia-ul-Haq of Pakistan. Port visits included Pearl Harbor; Subic Bay in the Republic of the Philippines; Karachi, Pakistan; Mombasa, Kenya; Maxime, France; Roosevelt Roads, Puerto Rico; and St. Croix and St. Thomas, U.S. Virgin Islands. Vandegrift returned home to Long Beach in June 1987.

The ship's second deployment began in June 1988, returning her to operations in the Persian Gulf shortly after the cease-fire between Iran and Iraq. Vandegrift's mission while on patrol in the northern Persian Gulf focused on providing protection and logistic support for joint forces in the area. Vandegrift also participated in numerous Earnest Will missions, escorting U.S. and reflagged Kuwaiti tankers. Port visits included Pearl Harbor; Subic Bay, Republic of the Philippines; Bahrain; Pattaya Beach, Thailand and Hong Kong. Vandegrift returned home in December 1988.

== 1990s ==
The ship's third deployment to the Persian Gulf began in March 1990. Vandegrift patrolled the Northern Persian Gulf and conducted Earnest Will escort missions. As the senior ship on station in the Persian Gulf during the invasion of Kuwait, Vandegrift served as the Anti-Air Warfare Commander and Electronic Warfare Coordinator. Vandegrift participated in Operation Desert Shield's Maritime Interception Operations with units from United Kingdom, Saudi Arabia, the United Arab Emirates and France. Ports of call included Pearl Harbor; Subic Bay; Phuket, Thailand; Singapore and Hong Kong. Vandegrift returned home after an extended deployment in October 1990.

On 22 April 1992, Vandegrift began her fourth deployment to the Persian Gulf. Vandegrift participated in exercises with India, Qatar and Pakistan, helping to strengthen U.S. relations in that area. Ports of call included Doha, Qatar; Dubai, Jebel Ali and Abu Dhabi, United Arab Emirates; Karachi, Pakistan; Phuket, Thailand; Goa, India; Bahrain; Hong Kong; Singapore and Guam, and earned the Chief of Naval Operations LAMPS Helicopter Safety Award. Vandegrift returned home on 22 October 1992.

From 1 January to 3 February 1993, Vandegrift was homeported in Long Beach, CA. Due to extensive shipyard time and the closing of Naval Station Long Beach, from 3 February 1993, Vandegrift was homeported in San Diego, CA. From 1 January to 2 April, Vandegrift was commanded by Commander Theodore L. Kaye. From 2 April to 31 December, Vandegrift was commanded by Commander David C. Harrison. From 1 January to 31 July, Vandegrift was under the administrative command of Commander, Destroyer Squadron 9. From 31 July to 31 December, Vandegrift was under the administrative command of Commander, Destroyer Squadron 33.

The ship earned the COMNAVSURFPAC Food Service Award in March 1994. The fifth deployment to the Persian Gulf began on 25 October 1994. Vandegrift's mission was the enforcement of UN sanctions against Iraq in the Northern Persian Gulf. The most memorable event was conducting a non-permissive boarding of a sanctions violator on 25 December. During the return transit, Vandegrift played host to a major diplomatic reception in Muscat, Oman, to better diplomatic relations. Ports of call included Sasebo, Japan; Manila, Republic of the Philippines; Jebel Ali, United Arab Emirates; Bahrain; Singapore and Hong Kong. Vandegrift returned home on 25 April 1995.

In 1998, the ship shifted homeports to Yokosuka, Japan. Between 1998 and 2000, the ship performed numerous cruises to South Korea, Thailand, China, Singapore, the Marianas Islands, Australia, and conducted a RIMPAC deployment to Hawaii in company with the Japanese Navy. In 1999, the vessel was visited by Admiral Jay L. Johnson, then Chief of Naval Operations (CNO).

== 2000s ==
In January 2003, Vandegrift deployed for the eighth time to the Persian Gulf in support of Operation Iraqi Freedom/Operation Enduring Freedom. Assigned escort operations in the Straits of Hormuz, Vandegrift conducted over 180 transits, safely escorting over 78 vessels carrying over 1 million tons of hardware in support of Operation Iraqi Freedom. Additionally, Vandegrift seized two Iraqi mine-laying vessels in the Southern Persian Gulf and was credited with protecting the Coalition’s flank from planned mine-laying operations.

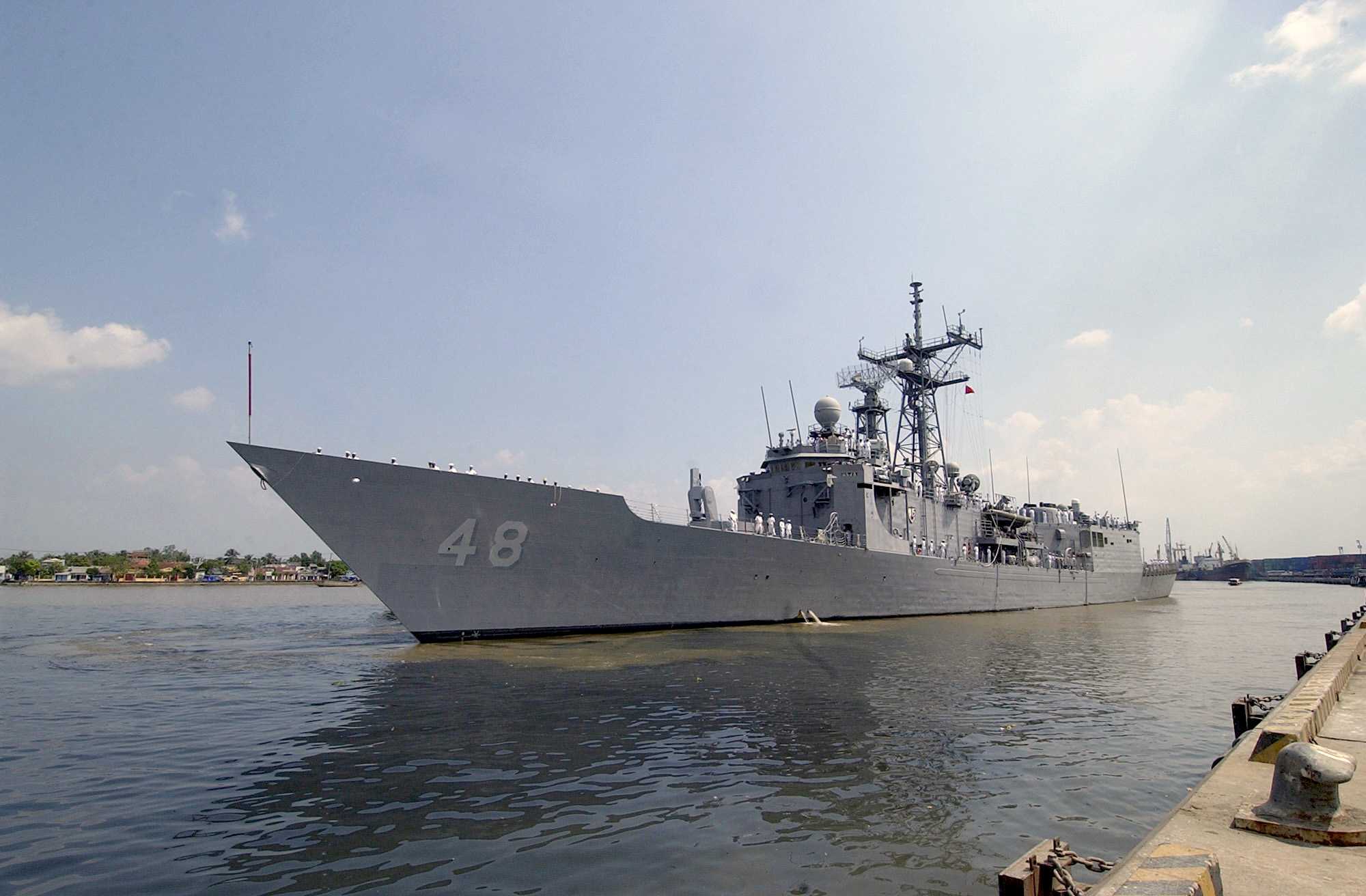
Vandegrift in Ho Chi Minh City, Vietnam, 19 November 2003

On 19 November 2003, the frigate became the first US warship to enter Vietnamese waters since April 1975.

The ship's decorations include the Meritorious Unit Commendation, National Defense Service Medal, Armed Forces Expeditionary Medal; Southwest Asia Service Medal, and five Sea Service Ribbons.

As of 2006, Vandegrift was based in San Diego, California.

== 2010s ==
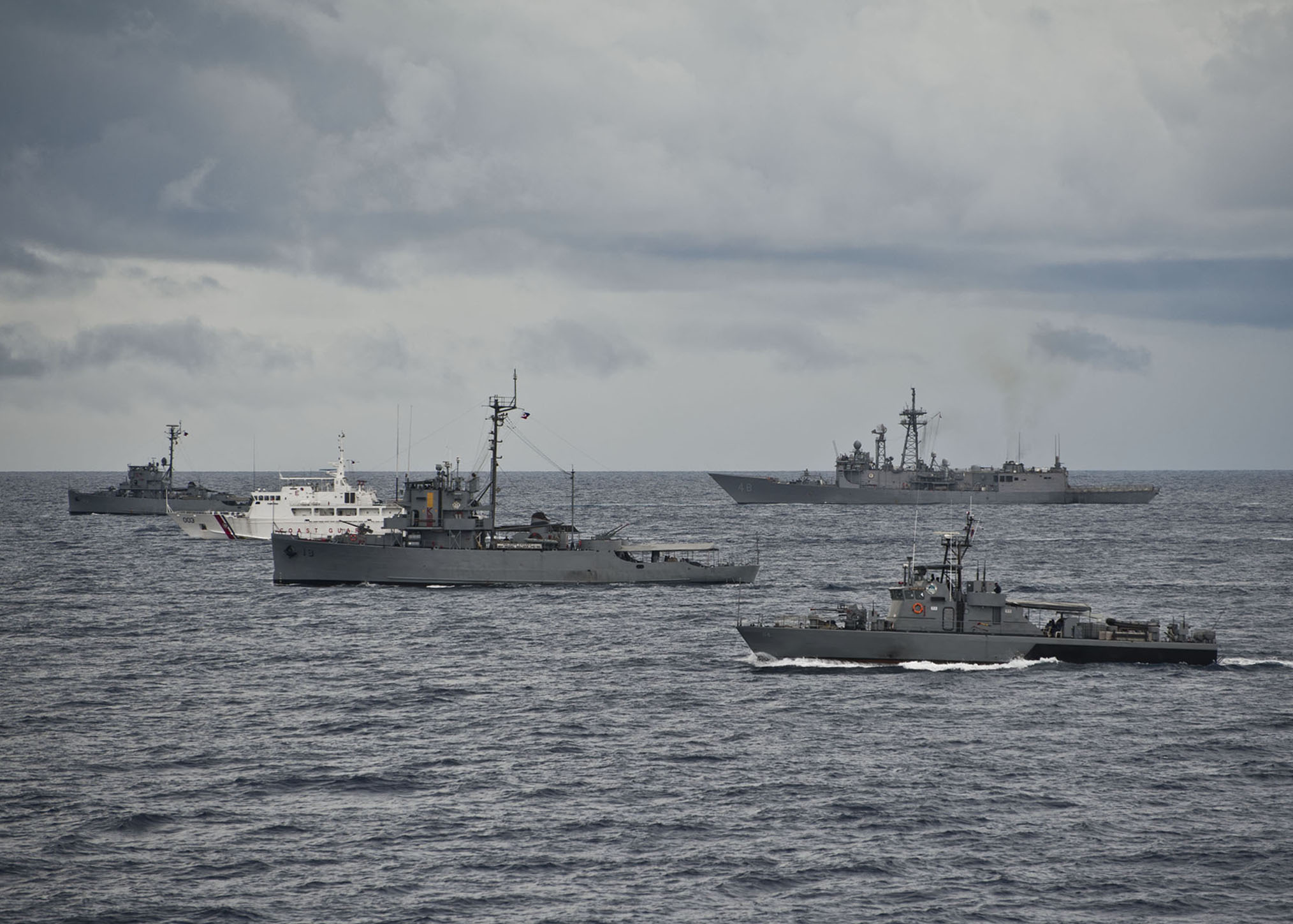
Vandegrift sails with BRP Miguel Malvar, BRP Iloilo, BRP Iloilo, and PCG Pampanga, 8 July 2012.

In March 2014, Eric and Charlotte Kauffman, and their daughters, three-year-old Cora and one-year-old Lyra, set sail from San Diego, California, to circumnavigate the globe in their 36-foot sailboat, Rebel Heart. Lyra fell sick, however, and on 3 April the family sent a distress call, from a position hundreds of miles off the Mexican coast. A Lockheed MC-130P Combat Shadow of the California Air National Guard’s 130th Rescue Squadron, 129th Rescue Wing, flew out to the area and four pararescuemen jumped into the water, climbed on board the sailboat and medically treated and stabilized Lyra. Vandegrift reached the area on 5 April, and at about 0800 the following morning, she lowered a team in a rigid hull inflatable boat (RHIB), and the sailors brought the family and the pararescuemen on board the frigate. The rescuers provided the Kauffmans with food, water, and medical assistance, but instructed the castaways that because of the limited room on board the RHIB and ship, they could only retrieve three bags of their personal belongings in a single trip before Vandegrift sank Rebel Heart as a hazard to navigation. Some of the Kauffmans' neighbors in the San Diego area therefore raised funds and donated goods to help the family recover from their ordeal when they returned ashore.

From 1 May to 28 November 2012 Vandegrift participated in a CARAT deployment, visiting Russia, Japan, Cambodia, Malaysia, and other Pacific nations.

Vandegrift returned from its final deployment on 12 December 2014, where she operated in the U.S. Naval Forces Southern Command/U.S. 4th Fleet area of responsibility (AOR). During this final deployment, Vandegrift was part of the counter-transnational organized crime (C-TOC) mission Operation Martillo, a joint, combined operation involving the U.S. and 14 European and Western Hemisphere partner nations, that targets illicit trafficking routes in the waters off Central America. While participating in Operation Martillo, Vandegrift intercepted approximately 8,996 kg of cocaine. The ship also participated in three community relations (COMREL) projects in Panama City during which 36 sailors helped build a workshop for the blind, assist an outreach group in refurbishing their building and spent time with children in the Aid for AIDS community.

After returning from her last deployment, the crew began to make preparations for decommissioning. After over 30 years of service, Vandegrift was decommissioned on 19 February 2015 at Naval Base San Diego.

She was sunk as a target in a SINKEX as a part of the Valiant Shield 2022 training exercise.
