= Family Readiness Group =

Soldier and Family Readiness Group (SFRG) is a command-sponsored organization of family members, volunteers, soldiers, and civilian employees associated with a particular unit within the United States Army, the United States Army Reserve, and the Army National Guard communities. They are normally organized at company and battalion levels, and fall under the responsibility of the unit's commanding officer. The original name, Family Readiness Group (FRG), was formally changed by the Army in April 2019 to Soldier and Family Readiness Group (SFRG) and it established the Command Family Readiness Representatives (CFRRs) which works together with the commanders for central leadership and coordination of responsibilities.

SFRG's are established to provide activities and support to enhance the flow of information, increase the resiliency of unit soldiers and their families, provide practical tools for adjusting to military deployments and separations, and enhance the well-being and esprit de corps within the unit. Since one of the goals of an SFRG is to support the military mission through provision of support, outreach, and information to family members, certain SFRG activities are essential and common to all groups, and include member meetings, staff and committee meetings, publication and distribution of newsletters, maintenance of virtual SFRG websites, maintenance of updated rosters and readiness information, and member telephone trees and e-mail distribution lists.

All army units, both active and reserve, sponsor SFRGs as an avenue of mutual support and assistance, and as a network of communications among the family members, the chain of command, chain of concern, and community resources. The SFRG also provides feedback to the command on the state of the unit "family" and is considered a unit commander’s program.

SFRGs developed after the first Gulf War out of military family support groups as well as less formal officer and enlisted wives clubs, telephone and social rosters, volunteer groups, and clubs. Modern SFRGs are a fully defined and officially supported function within the U.S. Army, and include men, women, and children from throughout the military community.

== Mission ==
1. Foster competent, knowledgeable, and resilient families.
2. Act as an extension of the unit in providing official, accurate command information.
3. Provide mutual support.
4. Build Soldier and family cohesion and foster a positive outlook.
5. Advocate more efficient use of community resources.
6. Help families solve problems at the lowest level.
7. Reduce stress and promote Soldier and family readiness.
8. Contribute to the well-being and esprit de corps of the unit.

== Goals ==
1. Gaining necessary family support during deployments.
2. Preparing for deployments and redeployments.
3. Helping families adjust to military life and cope with deployments.
4. Developing open and honest channels of communication between the command and family members.
5. Promoting confidence, cohesion, commitment, and a sense of well-being among the unit’s Soldiers.

== Activities ==
Some activities that FRGs commonly sponsor coordinate, or participate in that directly or indirectly foster unit family readiness goals include (but are not limited to):

- Classes and workshops.
- Volunteer recognition.
- Unit send-off and welcome home activities.
- FRG member, staff or committee meetings.
- Newcomer orientation and sponsorship.

Of note with regard to classes and workshops, Army Community Service has programs and services that can provide support and subject matter experts to educate family members on a variety of subjects: i.e. military benefits, prenatal care, preparing for deployments, family services, Operation READY training, Army Family Team Building, coping with stress, reunion, homecoming, reintegration, deployment cycle support, etc. Of note with regard to unit send-offs and homecoming activities, these events are garrison funded, and should not be funded with monies designated for FRGs, which are primarily raised by non-profit fundraising efforts.

== See also ==
- Morale, Welfare and Recreation
- United States Marine Corps Wounded Warrior Regiment
