= List of United States Navy four-star admirals =

Flag of a Navy four-star admiral

The rank of admiral (or full admiral, or four-star admiral) is the highest rank normally achievable in the United States Navy. It ranks above vice admiral (three-star admiral) and below fleet admiral (five-star admiral).

There have been 283 four-star admirals in the history of the U.S. Navy. Of these, 242 achieved that rank while on active duty, 40 were promoted upon retirement in recognition of combat citations, and one was promoted posthumously. Admirals entered the Navy via several paths: 238 were commissioned via the U.S. Naval Academy (USNA), 28 via Naval Reserve Officers Training Corps (NROTC), nine via Officer Candidate School (OCS), two via warrant, two via Aviation Officer Candidate School (AOCS), one via direct commission (direct), one via the Naval Aviation Cadet (NAVCAD) program, and one via the U.S. Merchant Marine.

== List of admirals ==
Entries in the following list of four-star admirals are indexed by the numerical order in which each officer was promoted to that rank while on active duty, or by an asterisk (*) if the officer did not serve in that rank while on active duty. Each entry lists the admiral's name, date of rank, active-duty positions held while serving at four-star rank, number of years of active-duty service at four-star rank (Yrs), year commissioned and source of commission, number of years in commission when promoted to four-star rank (YC), and other biographical notes.

#	Name	Photo	Date of rank	Position	Yrs	Commission	YC	Notes
1	David G. Farragut		25 Jul 1866	Admiral of the Navy, 1866–1870.; Commander, European Squadron, 1867–1868.	4	1810 (warrant)	56	(1801–1870) Brother-by-adoption of Navy four-star admiral David D. Porter Jr.
2	David D. Porter Jr.		15 Aug 1870	Admiral of the Navy, 1870–1891.; Head, Board of Inspection, 1877–1891.	21	1829 (warrant)	41	(1813–1891) Superintendent, U.S. Naval Academy, 1865–1869. Brother-by-adoption of Navy four-star admiral David G. Farragut.
3	George Dewey		2 Mar 1899	Commander, Asiatic Station, 1898–1899.; President, General Board of the Navy, 1900–1917.	18	1858 (USNA)	41	(1837–1917) Promoted to admiral, 8 Mar 1899 but was promoted to Admiral of the Navy, 24 Mar 1903, with retroactive date of rank 2 Mar 1899. Candidate for Democratic Party nomination for U.S. President, 1900.
4	Frank F. Fletcher		10 Mar 1915	Commander in Chief, U.S. Atlantic Fleet (CINCLANT), 1914–1916.	2	1875 (USNA)	40	(1855–1928) Awarded Medal of Honor, 1914. Uncle of Navy four-star admiral Frank J. Fletcher.
5	Thomas B. Howard		11 Mar 1915	Commander in Chief, U.S. Pacific Fleet (CINCPAC), 1914–1915.	1	1873 (USNA)	42	(1854–1920) Superintendent, U.S. Naval Observatory, 1917–1919.
6	Walter C. Cowles		12 Mar 1915	Commander in Chief, U.S. Asiatic Fleet (CINCAF), 1914–1915.	1	1873 (USNA)	42	(1853–1917)
7	Albert G. Winterhalter		9 Jul 1915	Commander in Chief, U.S. Asiatic Fleet (CINCAF), 1915–1917.	2	1877 (USNA)	38	(1856–1920)
8	Cameron M. Winslow		13 Sep 1915	Commander in Chief, U.S. Pacific Fleet (CINCPAC), 1915–1916.	1	1875 (USNA)	40	(1854–1932)
9	Henry T. Mayo		19 Jun 1916	Commander in Chief, U.S. Atlantic Fleet (CINCLANT), 1916–1919.; Commander in Chief, U.S. Fleet (CINCUS), 1919.	3	1876 (USNA)	41	(1857–1937) Governor, U.S. Naval Home, 1924–1928.
10	William B. Caperton		28 Jul 1916	Commander in Chief, U.S. Pacific Fleet (CINCPAC), 1916–1919.	3	1875 (USNA)	41	(1855–1941) Special Representative of the President in Brazil, 1918.
11	William S. Benson		29 Aug 1916	Chief of Naval Operations (CNO), 1915–1919.	3	1877 (USNA)	39	(1855–1932) Chairman/Commissioner, U.S. Shipping Board, 1919–1928.
12	Austin M. Knight		4 Apr 1917	Commander in Chief, U.S. Asiatic Fleet (CINCAF), 1917–1918.	1	1873 (USNA)	44	(1854–1927) President, Naval War College, 1913–1917. Brother of Seattle Mayor Bertha Knight Landes.
13	William S. Sims		4 Dec 1918	Commander, U.S. Naval Forces in European Waters, 1917–1919.	2	1880 (USNA)	38	(1858–1936) President, Naval War College, 1917; 1919–1922. Awarded Pulitzer Prize for History, 1921.
14	Henry B. Wilson Jr.		30 Jun 1919	Commander in Chief, U.S. Atlantic Fleet (CINCLANT), 1919–1921.	2	1881 (USNA)	38	(1861–1954) Superintendent, U.S. Naval Academy, 1921–1925. Father-in-law of U.S. Secretary of War Patrick J. Hurley.
15	Hugh Rodman		1 Jul 1919	Commander in Chief, U.S. Pacific Fleet (CINCPAC), 1919–1921.	2	1880 (USNA)	39	(1859–1940) U.S. Minister and Envoy to Peru, 1921.
16	Albert Gleaves		1 Sep 1919	Commander in Chief, U.S. Asiatic Fleet (CINCAF), 1919–1921.	2	1877 (USNA)	42	(1858–1937) Governor, U.S. Naval Home, 1928–1931.
17	Robert E. Coontz		1 Nov 1919	Chief of Naval Operations (CNO), 1919–1923.; Commander in Chief, U.S. Fleet (CINCUS), 1923–1925.	6	1885 (USNA)	34	(1864–1935) Governor of Guam, 1912–1913.
18	Joseph Strauss		4 Feb 1921	Commander in Chief, U.S. Asiatic Fleet (CINCAF), 1921–1922.	1	1885 (USNA)	36	(1861–1948)
19	Hilary P. Jones		30 Jun 1921	Commander in Chief, U.S. Atlantic Fleet (CINCLANT), 1921–1922.; Commander in Chief, U.S. Fleet (CINCUS), 1922–1923.	2	1884 (USNA)	37	(1865–1939)
20	Edward W. Eberle		5 Jul 1921	Commander in Chief, U.S. Pacific Fleet (CINCPAC), 1921.; Commander in Chief, U.S. Battle Fleet (COMBATFLT), 1921–1923.; Chief of Naval Operations (CNO), 1923–1927.	6	1885 (USNA)	36	(1864–1929) Superintendent, U.S. Naval Academy, 1915–1919.
21	Edwin A. Anderson		28 Aug 1922	Commander in Chief, U.S. Asiatic Fleet (CINCAF), 1922–1923.	1	1882 (USNA)	40	(1860–1933) Awarded Medal of Honor, 1914.
22	Samuel S. Robison		30 Jun 1923	Commander in Chief, U.S. Battle Fleet (COMBATFLT), 1923–1925.; Commander in Chief, U.S. Fleet (CINCUS), 1925–1926.	3	1888 (USNA)	35	(1867–1952) Military Governor of Santo Domingo, 1921–1922; Superintendent, U.S. Naval Academy, 1928–1931; Superintendent, Admiral Farragut Academy, 1931–1948. Brother-in-law of Navy four-star admiral Charles F. Hughes.
23	Thomas Washington		11 Oct 1923	Commander in Chief, U.S. Asiatic Fleet (CINCAF), 1923–1925.	2	1887 (USNA)	36	(1865–1954) Governor, U.S. Naval Home, 1931–1937.
24	Charles F. Hughes		14 Oct 1925	Commander in Chief, U.S. Battle Fleet (COMBATFLT), 1925–1926.; Commander in Chief, U.S. Fleet (CINCUS), 1926–1927.; Chief of Naval Operations (CNO), 1927–1930.	5	1888 (USNA)	37	(1866–1934) Brother-in-law of Navy four-star admiral Samuel S. Robison; daughter married brother of Navy five-star admiral Chester W. Nimitz.
25	Clarence S. Williams		14 Oct 1925	Commander in Chief, U.S. Asiatic Fleet (CINCAF), 1925–1927.	2	1884 (USNA)	41	(1863–1951) President, Naval War College, 1922–1925.
26	Richard H. Jackson		4 Sep 1926	Commander in Chief, U.S. Battle Fleet (COMBATFLT), 1926–1927.	1	1887 (USNA)	39	(1866–1971) Distant cousin of Air Force four-star general Charles P. Cabell.
27	Henry A. Wiley		8 Sep 1927	Commander in Chief, U.S. Fleet (CINCUS), 1927–1929.	2	1888 (USNA)	39	(1867–1943) Chairman/Commissioner, U.S. Maritime Commission, 1936–1940.
28	Mark L. Bristol		9 Sep 1927	Commander in Chief, U.S. Asiatic Fleet (CINCAF), 1927–1929.	2	1887 (USNA)	40	(1868–1939) U.S. High Commissioner, Turkey, 1919–1927.
29	Louis R. de Steiguer		10 Sep 1927	Commander in Chief, U.S. Battle Fleet (COMBATFLT), 1927–1928.	1	1889 (USNA)	38	(1867–1947)
30	William V. Pratt		26 Jun 1928	Commander in Chief, U.S. Battle Fleet (COMBATFLT), 1928–1929.; Commander in Chief, U.S. Fleet (CINCUS), 1929–1930.; Chief of Naval Operations (CNO), 1930–1933.	5	1889 (USNA)	39	(1869–1957) President, Naval War College, 1925–1927.
31	Louis M. Nulton		21 May 1929	Commander in Chief, U.S. Battle Fleet (COMBATFLT), 1929–1930.	1	1889 (USNA)	40	(1869–1954) Superintendent, U.S. Naval Academy, 1925–1928.
32	Charles B. McVay Jr.		9 Sep 1929	Commander in Chief, U.S. Asiatic Fleet (CINCAF), 1929–1931.	2	1890 (USNA)	39	(1868–1949)
33	Frank H. Schofield		24 May 1930	Commander in Chief, U.S. Battle Fleet (COMBATFLT), 1930–1931.; Commander, Battle Force, U.S. Fleet (COMBATFOR), 1931.; Commander in Chief, U.S. Fleet (CINCUS), 1931–1932.	2	1890 (USNA)	40	(1869–1942)
34	Jehu V. Chase		17 Sep 1930	Commander in Chief, U.S. Fleet (CINCUS), 1930–1931.	1	1890 (USNA)	40	(1869–1937) Great-grandfather of Navy four-star admiral James F. Caldwell Jr.
35	Montgomery M. Taylor		1 Sep 1931	Commander in Chief, U.S. Asiatic Fleet (CINCAF), 1931–1933.	2	1890 (USNA)	41	(1869–1952) Grandnephew of U.S. President Zachary Taylor; distant cousin of Army four-star general Montgomery C. Meigs.
36	Richard H. Leigh		15 Sep 1931	Commander, Battle Force, U.S. Fleet (COMBATFOR), 1931–1932.; Commander in Chief, U.S. Fleet (CINCUS), 1932–1933.	2	1891 (USNA)	40	(1870–1946)
37	Luke McNamee		11 Aug 1932	Commander, Battle Force, U.S. Fleet (COMBATFOR), 1932–1933.	1	1892 (USNA)	40	(1871–1952) Governor of Guam, 1907; Director of Naval Intelligence, 1921–1923; President, Naval War College, 1933–1934.
38	William H. Standley		20 May 1933	Commander, Battle Force, U.S. Fleet (COMBATFOR), 1933.; Chief of Naval Operations (CNO), 1933–1937.	4	1895 (USNA)	38	(1872–1963) U.S. Ambassador to the Soviet Union, 1942–1943.
39	David F. Sellers		10 Jun 1933	Commander in Chief, U.S. Fleet (CINCUS), 1933–1934.	1	1894 (USNA)	39	(1874–1949) Superintendent, U.S. Naval Academy, 1934–1938.
40	Joseph M. Reeves		1 Jul 1933	Commander, Battle Force, U.S. Fleet (COMBATFOR), 1933–1934.; Commander in Chief, U.S. Fleet (CINCUS), 1934–1936.	3	1894 (USNA)	39	(1872–1948)
41	Frank B. Upham		18 Aug 1933	Commander in Chief, U.S. Asiatic Fleet (CINCAF), 1933–1935.	2	1893 (USNA)	40	(1872–1939) Married aunt of Navy four-star admiral Robert B. Carney.
42	Frank H. Brumby		15 Jun 1934	Commander, Battle Force, U.S. Fleet (COMBATFOR), 1934–1935.	1	1895 (USNA)	39	(1874–1950)
43	Harris Laning		1 Apr 1935	Commander, Battle Force, U.S. Fleet (COMBATFOR), 1935–1936.	1	1895 (USNA)	40	(1873–1941) President, Naval War College, 1930–1933; Governor, U.S. Naval Home, 1937–1941.
44	Orin G. Murfin		4 Oct 1935	Commander in Chief, U.S. Asiatic Fleet (CINCAF), 1935–1936.	1	1897 (USNA)	38	(1876–1956)
45	William D. Leahy		30 Mar 1936	Commander, Battle Force, U.S. Fleet (COMBATFOR), 1936–1937.; Chief of Naval Operations (CNO), 1937–1939.; Chief of Staff to the Commander in Chief, Army and Navy, 1942–1949.	5	1897 (USNA)	39	(1875–1959) Promoted to fleet admiral, 15 Dec 1944. Governor of Puerto Rico, 1939–1940; U.S. Ambassador to France, 1941–1942. Wife's niece married Navy four-star admiral David W. Bagley.
46	Arthur J. Hepburn		24 Jun 1936	Commander in Chief, U.S. Fleet (CINCUS), 1936–1938.	2	1897 (USNA)	39	(1877–1964)
47	Harry E. Yarnell		30 Oct 1936	Commander in Chief, U.S. Asiatic Fleet (CINCAF), 1936–1939.	3	1897 (USNA)	39	(1875–1959)
48	Claude C. Bloch		2 Jan 1937	Commander, Battle Force, U.S. Fleet (COMBATFOR), 1937–1938.; Commander in Chief, U.S. Fleet (CINCUS), 1938–1940.	3	1899 (USNA)	38	(1878–1967)
49	Edward C. Kalbfus		29 Jan 1938	Commander, Battle Force, U.S. Fleet (COMBATFOR), 1938–1939.	1	1899 (USNA)	39	(1877–1954) President, Naval War College, 1934–1936; 1939–1942.
50	James O. Richardson		24 Jun 1939	Commander, Battle Force, U.S. Fleet (COMBATFOR), 1939–1940.; Commander in Chief, U.S. Fleet (CINCUS), 1940–1941.	2	1902 (USNA)	37	(1878–1974) Relieved, 1941.
51	Thomas C. Hart		25 Jul 1939	Commander in Chief, U.S. Asiatic Fleet (CINCAF), 1939–1942.	3	1897 (USNA)	42	(1877–1971) Superintendent, U.S. Naval Academy, 1931–1934; U.S. Senator from Connecticut, 1945–1946.
52	Harold R. Stark		1 Aug 1939	Chief of Naval Operations (CNO), 1939–1942.; Commander, U.S. Naval Forces, Europe (COMNAVEUR), 1942–1945.	6	1903 (USNA)	36	(1880–1972)
53	Charles P. Snyder		6 Jan 1940	Commander, Battle Force, U.S. Fleet (COMBATFOR), 1940–1941.	1	1900 (USNA)	40	(1879–1964) President, Naval War College, 1937–1939.
54	Husband E. Kimmel		1 Feb 1941	Commander in Chief, U.S. Pacific Fleet/Commander in Chief, U.S. Fleet (CINCPAC/CINCUS), 1941.	0	1904 (USNA)	37	(1882–1968) Relieved, 1941. Brother-in-law of Navy four-star admiral Thomas C. Kinkaid.
55	Ernest J. King		1 Feb 1941	Commander in Chief, U.S. Atlantic Fleet (CINCLANT), 1941.; Commander in Chief, U.S. Fleet (COMINCH), 1941–1942.; Commander in Chief, U.S. Fleet/Chief of Naval Operations (COMINCH/CNO), 1942–1945.	3	1901 (USNA)	40	(1878–1956) Promoted to fleet admiral, 17 Dec 1944. Awarded Congressional Gold Medal, 1946. Father-in-law of Air Force four-star general Frederic H. Smith Jr.
56	Chester W. Nimitz		31 Dec 1941	Commander in Chief, U.S. Pacific Fleet (CINCPAC), 1941–1943.; Commander in Chief, U.S. Pacific Fleet/Commander in Chief, Pacific Ocean Areas (CINCPAC/CINCPOA), 1943–1944.; Commander in Chief, U.S. Pacific Fleet/Commander in Chief, Pacific Ocean Areas/Military Governor of the Mariana Islands (CINCPAC/CINCPOA), 1944–1945.	3	1905 (USNA)	36	(1885–1966) Promoted to fleet admiral, 19 Dec 1944. Brother married daughter of Navy four-star admiral Charles F. Hughes.
57	Royal E. Ingersoll		1 Jul 1942	Commander in Chief, U.S. Atlantic Fleet (CINCLANT), 1941–1944.; Commander, Western Sea Frontier (COMWESTSEAFRON), 1944–1946.; Deputy Commander in Chief, U.S. Fleet/Deputy Chief of Naval Operations (DCOMINCH/DCNO), 1944–1945.	3	1905 (USNA)	37	(1883–1976)
58	William F. Halsey Jr.		18 Nov 1942	Commander, South Pacific Area/Commander, South Pacific Force (COMSOPAC/COMSOPACFOR), 1942–1944.; Commander, U.S. Third Fleet (COMTHIRDFLT), 1944–1945.	2	1904 (USNA)	38	(1882–1959) Promoted to fleet admiral, 4 Dec 1945.
59	Raymond A. Spruance		16 Feb 1944	Commander, Central Pacific Force (COMCENPACFOR), 1943–1944.; Commander, U.S. Fifth Fleet (COMFIFTHFLT), 1944–1945.; Commander in Chief, U.S. Pacific Fleet/Commander in Chief, Pacific Ocean Areas/Military Governor of the Marshall, Caroline, and Mariana Islands (CINCPAC/CINCPOA), 1945–1946.; President, Naval War College, 1946–1948.	4	1906 (USNA)	38	(1886–1969) U.S. Ambassador to the Philippines, 1952–1955.
60	Jonas H. Ingram		15 Nov 1944	Commander in Chief, U.S. Atlantic Fleet (CINCLANT), 1944–1946.	2	1909 (USNA)	35	(1886–1952) Commissioner, All-America Football Conference, 1947–1949. Awarded Medal of Honor, 1914.
61	Frederick J. Horne		15 Dec 1944	Vice Chief of Naval Operations (VCNO), 1942–1945.	1	1899 (USNA)	45	(1880–1959)
62	Richard S. Edwards Jr.		3 Apr 1945	Deputy Commander in Chief, U.S. Fleet/Deputy Chief of Naval Operations (DCOMINCH/DCNO), 1944–1945.; Vice Chief of Naval Operations (VCNO), 1945–1946.; Commander, Western Sea Frontier/Commander, Pacific Reserve Fleet (COMWESTSEAFRON/COMPACRESFLT), 1946–1947.	2	1907 (USNA)	38	(1885–1956)
63	H. Kent Hewitt		3 Apr 1945	Commander, U.S. Eighth Fleet (COMEIGHTHFLT), 1943–1945.; Commander, U.S. Naval Forces, Europe (COMNAVEUR), 1945–1946.; U.S. Naval Representative, U.N. Military Staff Committee (USNAVYMILCOMUNO), 1947–1949.	4	1907 (USNA)	38	(1887–1972)
64	Thomas C. Kinkaid		3 Apr 1945	Commander, U.S. Seventh Fleet (COMSEVENTHFLT), 1943–1945.; Commander, Eastern Sea Frontier/Commander, Atlantic Reserve Fleet (COMEASTSEAFRON/COMLANTRESFLT), 1946–1950.	5	1908 (USNA)	37	(1888–1972) Brother-in-law of Navy four-star admiral Husband E. Kimmel.
65	Richmond K. Turner		24 May 1945	Commander, Amphibious Forces, Pacific (COMPHIBPAC), 1944–1945.; U.S Naval Representative, U.N. Military Staff Committee (USNAVYMILCOMUNO), 1945–1947.	2	1908 (USNA)	37	(1885–1961)
66	Samuel M. Robinson		27 Aug 1945	Director, Office of Procurement and Material, 1942–1946.	1	1903 (USNA)	42	(1882–1972) Administrator, Webb Institute of Naval Architecture, 1946–1951. First staff corps officer to attain rank of admiral.
*	John S. McCain Sr.		6 Sep 1945	(posthumous)	0	1906 (USNA)	39	(1884–1945) Father of Navy four-star admiral John S. McCain Jr.; grandfather of U.S. Senator John S. McCain III.
67	John H. Towers		7 Nov 1945	Commander, U.S. Fifth Fleet (COMFIFTHFLT), 1945–1946.; Commander in Chief, U.S. Pacific Fleet/Commander in Chief, Pacific Ocean Areas/Military Governor of the Marshall, Caroline, and Mariana Islands (CINCPAC/CINCPOA), 1946–1947.; Commander in Chief, Pacific Command/Commander in Chief, U.S. Pacific Fleet/Military Governor of the Marshall, Caroline, and Mariana Islands (CINCPAC/CINCPACFLT), 1947.; Chairman, General Board of the Navy, 1947.	2	1906 (USNA)	39	(1885–1955)
68	DeWitt C. Ramsey		28 Dec 1945	Vice Chief of Naval Operations (VCNO), 1946–1948.; Commander in Chief, Pacific Command/Commander in Chief, U.S. Pacific Fleet/High Commissioner, Trust Territory of the Pacific Islands (CINCPAC/CINCPACFLT), 1948–1949.	4	1912 (USNA)	33	(1888–1961)
69	Louis E. Denfeld		7 Jan 1946	Commander in Chief, Pacific Command/Commander in Chief, U.S. Pacific Fleet/Military Governor of the Marshall, Caroline, and Mariana Islands (CINCPAC/CINCPACFLT), 1947.; Commander in Chief, Pacific Command/Commander in Chief, U.S. Pacific Fleet/High Commissioner, Trust Territory of the Pacific Islands (CINCPAC/CINCPACFLT), 1947.; Chief of Naval Operations (CNO), 1947–1949.	2	1912 (USNA)	34	(1891–1972) Candidate for Republican Party nomination for Governor of Massachusetts, 1950. Relieved, 1949.
70	Charles M. Cooke Jr.		8 Jan 1946	Commander, U.S. Seventh Fleet (COMSEVENTHFLT), 1946–1947.; Commander, U.S. Naval Forces, Western Pacific (COMNAVWESPAC), 1947–1948.	2	1910 (USNA)	36	(1886–1970)
71	Marc A. Mitscher		1 Mar 1946	Commander in Chief, U.S. Atlantic Fleet (CINCLANTFLT), 1946–1947.	1	1910 (USNA)	36	(1887–1947) Died in office.
72	Ben Moreell		11 Jun 1946	Chief of Naval Material (CNM), 1946.	0	1917 (direct)	29	(1892–1978)
73	Richard L. Conolly		23 Sep 1946	Commander, U.S. Naval Forces, Europe (COMNAVEUR), 1946.; Commander, U.S. Naval Forces, Eastern Atlantic and Mediterranean (COMNAVEASTLANTMED), 1946–1947.; Commander in Chief, U.S. Naval Forces, Eastern Atlantic and Mediterranean (CINCNAVEASTLANTMED), 1947–1948.; Commander in Chief, U.S. Naval Forces, Eastern Atlantic and Mediterranean (CINCNELM), 1948–1950.	4	1914 (USNA)	32	(1892–1962) President, Naval War College, 1950–1953; President, Long Island University, 1953–1962.
74	William H.P. Blandy		3 Feb 1947	Commander in Chief, U.S. Atlantic Fleet (CINCLANTFLT), 1947.; Commander in Chief, Atlantic Command/Commander in Chief, U.S. Atlantic Fleet (CINCLANT/CINCLANTFLT), 1947–1950.	3	1913 (USNA)	34	(1890–1954)
75	Arthur W. Radford		7 Apr 1949	Commander in Chief, Pacific Command/Commander in Chief, U.S. Pacific Fleet/High Commissioner, Trust Territory of the Pacific Islands (CINCPAC/CINCPACFLT), 1949–1951.; Commander in Chief, Pacific Command/Commander in Chief, U.S. Pacific Fleet (CINCPAC/CINCPACFLT), 1951–1953.; Chairman, Joint Chiefs of Staff (CJCS), 1953–1957.	8	1916 (USNA)	33	(1896–1973) Married aunt of Army four-star general Michael S. Davison.
76	Forrest P. Sherman		2 Nov 1949	Chief of Naval Operations (CNO), 1949–1951.	2	1917 (USNA)	32	(1896–1951) Died in office.
77	William M. Fechteler		1 Feb 1950	Commander in Chief, Atlantic Command/Commander in Chief, U.S. Atlantic Fleet (CINCLANT/CINCLANTFLT), 1950–1951.; Chief of Naval Operations (CNO), 1951–1953.; Commander in Chief, Allied Forces Southern Europe (CINCSOUTH), 1953–1956.	6	1916 (USNA)	34	(1896–1967)
78	Robert B. Carney		2 Oct 1950	Commander in Chief, U.S. Naval Forces, Eastern Atlantic and Mediterranean (CINCNELM), 1950–1951.; Commander in Chief, Allied Forces Southern Europe/Commander in Chief, U.S. Naval Forces, Eastern Atlantic and Mediterranean (CINCSOUTH/CINCNELM), 1951–1952.; Commander in Chief, Allied Forces Southern Europe (CINCSOUTH), 1952–1953.; Chief of Naval Operations (CNO), 1953–1955.	5	1916 (USNA)	34	(1895–1990) Aunt married Navy four-star admiral Frank B. Upham.
79	Lynde D. McCormick		22 Dec 1950	Vice Chief of Naval Operations (VCNO), 1950–1951.; Commander in Chief, Atlantic Command/Commander in Chief, U.S. Atlantic Fleet (CINCLANT/CINCLANTFLT), 1951–1952.; Supreme Allied Commander Atlantic/Commander in Chief, Atlantic Command/Commander in Chief, U.S. Atlantic Fleet (SACLANT/CINCLANT/CINCLANTFLT), 1952–1954.	4	1915 (USNA)	35	(1895–1956) President, Naval War College, 1954–1956.
80	Donald B. Duncan		9 Aug 1951	Vice Chief of Naval Operations (VCNO), 1951–1956.	5	1917 (USNA)	34	(1896–1975) Governor, U.S. Naval Home, 1957–1962. Brother-in-law of U.S. Secretary of Commerce Harry L. Hopkins.
81	Felix B. Stump		27 Jun 1953	Commander in Chief, Pacific Command/Commander in Chief, U.S. Pacific Fleet (CINCPAC/CINCPACFLT), 1953–1958.; Commander in Chief, Pacific Command (CINCPAC), 1958.	5	1917 (USNA)	36	(1894–1972)
82	Jerauld Wright		6 Apr 1954	Supreme Allied Commander Atlantic/Commander in Chief, Atlantic Command/Commander in Chief, U.S. Atlantic Fleet (SACLANT/CINCLANT/CINCLANTFLT), 1954–1960.	6	1917 (USNA)	37	(1898–1995) U.S. Ambassador to China, 1963–1965.
83	John H. Cassady		7 Apr 1954	Commander in Chief, U.S. Naval Forces, Eastern Atlantic and Mediterranean (CINCNELM), 1954–1956.	2	1918 (USNA)	36	(1896–1969)
84	Arleigh A. Burke		6 Jun 1955	Chief of Naval Operations (CNO), 1955–1961.	6	1923 (USNA)	32	(1901–1996) Awarded Presidential Medal of Freedom, 1977.
85	Robert P. Briscoe		30 Apr 1956	Commander in Chief, Allied Forces Southern Europe (CINCSOUTH), 1956–1959.	3	1918 (USNA)	38	(1897–1968)
86	Walter F. Boone		1 May 1956	Commander in Chief, U.S. Naval Forces, Eastern Atlantic and Mediterranean (CINCNELM), 1956–1958.; U.S. Military Representative, NATO Military Committee (USMILREP), 1958–1960.	4	1920 (USNA)	36	(1898–1995) Superintendent, U.S. Naval Academy, 1954–1956; Deputy Associate Administrator for Defense Affairs, National Aeronautics and Space Administration, 1962–1968.
87	Harry D. Felt		1 Sep 1956	Vice Chief of Naval Operations (VCNO), 1956–1958.; Commander in Chief, Pacific Command (CINCPAC), 1958–1964.	8	1923 (USNA)	33	(1902–1992)
88	Maurice E. Curts		29 Apr 1957	Deputy Commander in Chief, Pacific Command/Deputy Commander in Chief, U.S. Pacific Fleet (DCINCPAC/DCINCPACFLT), 1955–1958.; Commander in Chief, U.S. Pacific Fleet (CINCPACFLT), 1958.	1	1919 (USNA)	38	(1898–1976)
89	James L. Holloway Jr.		1 Jan 1958	Commander in Chief, U.S. Naval Forces, Eastern Atlantic and Mediterranean/Commander in Chief, Specified Command Middle East (CINCNELM/CINCSPECOMME), 1958–1959.	1	1918 (USNA)	40	(1898–1984) Superintendent, U.S. Naval Academy, 1947–1950; Governor, U.S. Naval Home, 1962–1966. Father of Navy four-star admiral James L. Holloway III.
90	Herbert G. Hopwood		1 Feb 1958	Commander in Chief, U.S. Pacific Fleet (CINCPACFLT), 1958–1960.	2	1919 (USNA)	39	(1898–1966)
91	James S. Russell		21 Jul 1958	Vice Chief of Naval Operations (VCNO), 1958–1961.; Commander in Chief, Allied Forces Southern Europe (CINCSOUTH), 1961–1965.	7	1926 (USNA)	32	(1903–1996)
92	Charles R. Brown		1 Jan 1959	Commander in Chief, Allied Forces Southern Europe (CINCSOUTH), 1959–1961.	2	1921 (USNA)	38	(1899–1983)
93	Robert L. Dennison		1 Feb 1959	Commander in Chief, U.S. Naval Forces, Eastern Atlantic and Mediterranean/Commander in Chief, Specified Command Middle East (CINCNELM/CINCSPECOMME), 1959–1960.; Supreme Allied Commander Atlantic/Commander in Chief, Atlantic Command/Commander in Chief, U.S. Atlantic Fleet (SACLANT/CINCLANT/CINCLANTFLT), 1960–1963.	4	1923 (USNA)	36	(1901–1980)
94	Harold Page Smith		1 Feb 1960	Commander in Chief, U.S. Naval Forces Europe/Commander in Chief, U.S. Naval Forces, Eastern Atlantic and Mediterranean (CINCUSNAVEUR/CINCNELM), 1960–1963.; Supreme Allied Commander Atlantic/Commander in Chief, Atlantic Command/Commander in Chief, U.S. Atlantic Fleet (SACLANT/CINCLANT/CINCLANTFLT), 1963–1965.	5	1924 (USNA)	36	(1904–1993) Uncle of Navy four-star admiral Leighton W. Smith Jr.
95	John H. Sides		1 Mar 1960	Commander in Chief, U.S. Pacific Fleet (CINCPACFLT), 1960–1963.	3	1925 (USNA)	35	(1904–1978)
96	George W. Anderson Jr.		1 Aug 1961	Chief of Naval Operations (CNO), 1961–1963.	2	1927 (USNA)	34	(1906–1992) U.S. Ambassador to Portugal, 1963–1966.
97	Claude V. Ricketts		1 Nov 1961	Vice Chief of Naval Operations (VCNO), 1961–1964.	3	1929 (USNA)	32	(1906–1964) Died in office.
98	David L. McDonald		1 Apr 1963	Commander in Chief, U.S. Naval Forces Europe/Commander in Chief, U.S. Naval Forces, Eastern Atlantic and Mediterranean (CINCUSNAVEUR/CINCNELM), 1963.; Chief of Naval Operations (CNO), 1963–1967.	4	1928 (USNA)	35	(1906–1997)
99	Charles D. Griffin		26 Jun 1963	Commander in Chief, U.S. Naval Forces Europe/Commander in Chief, U.S. Naval Forces, Eastern Atlantic and Mediterranean (CINCUSNAVEUR/CINCNELM), 1963.; Commander in Chief, U.S. Naval Forces Europe (CINCUSNAVEUR), 1963–1965.; Commander in Chief, Allied Forces Southern Europe (CINCSOUTH), 1965–1968.	5	1927 (USNA)	36	(1906–1996)
100	U.S. Grant Sharp Jr.		27 Sep 1963	Commander in Chief, U.S. Pacific Fleet (CINCPACFLT), 1963–1964.; Commander in Chief, Pacific Command (CINCPAC), 1964–1968.	5	1927 (USNA)	36	(1906–2001) Great-aunt married U.S. President Ulysses S. Grant.
101	Thomas H. Moorer		26 Jun 1964	Commander in Chief, U.S. Pacific Fleet (CINCPACFLT), 1964–1965.; Supreme Allied Commander Atlantic/Commander in Chief, Atlantic Command/Commander in Chief, U.S. Atlantic Fleet (SACLANT/CINCLANT/CINCLANTFLT), 1965–1967.; Chief of Naval Operations (CNO), 1967–1970.; Chairman, Joint Chiefs of Staff (CJCS), 1970–1974.	10	1933 (USNA)	31	(1912–2004)
102	Horacio Rivero Jr.		31 Jul 1964	Vice Chief of Naval Operations (VCNO), 1964–1968.; Commander in Chief, Allied Forces Southern Europe (CINCSOUTH), 1968–1972.	8	1931 (USNA)	33	(1910–2000) U.S. Ambassador to Spain, 1972–1974.
103	John S. Thach		25 Mar 1965	Commander in Chief, U.S. Naval Forces Europe (CINCUSNAVEUR), 1965–1967.	2	1927 (USNA)	38	(1905–1981)
104	Alfred G. Ward		27 Mar 1965	U.S. Military Representative, NATO Military Committee (USMILREP), 1965–1968.	3	1932 (USNA)	33	(1909–1982)
105	Roy L. Johnson		31 Mar 1965	Commander in Chief, U.S. Pacific Fleet (CINCPACFLT), 1965–1967.	2	1929 (USNA)	36	(1906–1999)
106	John S. McCain Jr.		1 May 1967	Commander in Chief, U.S. Naval Forces Europe (CINCUSNAVEUR), 1967–1968.; Commander in Chief, Pacific Command (CINCPAC), 1968–1972.	5	1931 (USNA)	36	(1911–1981) Son of Navy four-star admiral John S. McCain Sr.; father of U.S. Senator John S. McCain III.
107	Ignatius J. Galantin		19 May 1967	Chief of Naval Material (CNM), 1965–1970.	3	1933 (USNA)	34	(1910–2004)
108	Ephraim P. Holmes		17 Jun 1967	Supreme Allied Commander Atlantic/Commander in Chief, Atlantic Command/Commander in Chief, U.S. Atlantic Fleet (SACLANT/CINCLANT/CINCLANTFLT), 1967–1970.	3	1930 (USNA)	37	(1908–1997)
109	John J. Hyland Jr.		1 Dec 1967	Commander in Chief, U.S. Pacific Fleet (CINCPACFLT), 1967–1970.	3	1934 (USNA)	33	(1912–1998)
110	Bernard A. Clarey		17 Jan 1968	Vice Chief of Naval Operations (VCNO), 1968–1970.; Commander in Chief, U.S. Pacific Fleet (CINCPACFLT), 1970–1973.	5	1934 (USNA)	34	(1912–1996)
111	Waldemar F.A. Wendt		12 Jul 1968	Commander in Chief, U.S. Naval Forces Europe (CINCUSNAVEUR), 1968–1971.	3	1933 (USNA)	35	(1912–1997)
112	Elmo R. Zumwalt Jr.		1 Jul 1970	Chief of Naval Operations (CNO), 1970–1974.	4	1942 (USNA)	28	(1920–2000) Democratic Party nominee for U.S. Senator from Virginia, 1976. Awarded Presidential Medal of Freedom, 1998.
113	Charles K. Duncan		1 Sep 1970	Supreme Allied Commander Atlantic/Commander in Chief, Atlantic Command/Commander in Chief, U.S. Atlantic Fleet (SACLANT/CINCLANT/CINCLANTFLT), 1970–1972.	2	1933 (USNA)	37	(1911–1994)
114	Jackson D. Arnold		14 Oct 1970	Chief of Naval Material (CNM), 1970–1971.	1	1934 (USNA)	36	(1912–2007) First restricted line officer to attain rank of admiral.
115	Ralph W. Cousins		30 Oct 1970	Vice Chief of Naval Operations (VCNO), 1970–1972.; Supreme Allied Commander Atlantic/Commander in Chief, Atlantic Command/Commander in Chief, U.S. Atlantic Fleet (SACLANT/CINCLANT/CINCLANTFLT), 1972–1975.	5	1937 (USNA)	33	(1915–2009)
116	William F. Bringle		1 Jul 1971	Commander in Chief, U.S. Naval Forces Europe (CINCUSNAVEUR), 1971–1973.	2	1937 (USNA)	34	(1913–1999)
117	Isaac C. Kidd Jr.		1 Dec 1971	Chief of Naval Material (CNM), 1971–1975.; Supreme Allied Commander Atlantic/Commander in Chief, Atlantic Command/Commander in Chief, U.S. Atlantic Fleet (SACLANT/CINCLANT/CINCLANTFLT), 1975–1978.	7	1942 (USNA)	29	(1919–1999)
118	Richard G. Colbert		1 Jun 1972	Commander in Chief, Allied Forces Southern Europe (CINCSOUTH), 1972–1973.	1	1937 (USNA)	35	(1915–1973) President, Naval War College, 1968–1971.
119	Noel A.M. Gayler		1 Sep 1972	Commander in Chief, Pacific Command (CINCPAC), 1972–1976.	4	1935 (USNA)	37	(1914–2011) Director, National Security Agency, 1969–1972.
120	Maurice F. Weisner		1 Sep 1972	Vice Chief of Naval Operations (VCNO), 1972–1973.; Commander in Chief, U.S. Pacific Fleet (CINCPACFLT), 1973–1976.; Commander in Chief, Pacific Command (CINCPAC), 1976–1979.	7	1941 (USNA)	31	(1917–2006)
121	James L. Holloway III		1 Sep 1973	Vice Chief of Naval Operations (VCNO), 1973–1974.; Chief of Naval Operations (CNO), 1974–1978.	5	1942 (USNA)	31	(1922–2019) Son of Navy four-star admiral James L. Holloway Jr.
122	Worth H. Bagley		1 Sep 1973	Commander in Chief, U.S. Naval Forces Europe (CINCUSNAVEUR), 1973–1974.; Vice Chief of Naval Operations (VCNO), 1974–1975.	2	1947 (USNA)	26	(1924–2016) Son of Navy four-star admiral David W. Bagley; brother of Navy four-star admiral David H. Bagley; great-aunt married Navy five-star admiral William D. Leahy; great-aunt married U.S. Secretary of the Navy Josephus Daniels.
123	Hyman G. Rickover		16 Nov 1973	Director, Naval Reactors Branch, Atomic Energy Commission/Deputy Commander for Nuclear Propulsion, Naval Ship Systems Command, 1966–1974.; Director, Naval Reactors Branch, Atomic Energy Commission/Deputy Commander for Nuclear Propulsion, Naval Sea Systems Command, 1974–1975.; Director, Division of Naval Reactors, Energy Research and Development Administration/Deputy Commander for Nuclear Propulsion, Naval Sea Systems Command, 1975–1977.; Deputy Assistant Secretary for Naval Reactors, U.S. Department of Energy/Deputy Commander for Nuclear Propulsion, Naval Sea Systems Command, 1977–1982.	9	1922 (USNA)	51	(1900–1986) Awarded Presidential Medal of Freedom, 1980; Congressional Gold Medal, 1958 and 1982.
124	Means Johnston Jr.		25 Nov 1973	Commander in Chief, Allied Forces Southern Europe (CINCSOUTH), 1973–1975.	2	1939 (USNA)	34	(1916–1989)
125	Harold E. Shear		24 May 1974	Commander in Chief, U.S. Naval Forces Europe (CINCUSNAVEUR), 1974–1975.; Vice Chief of Naval Operations (VCNO), 1975–1977.; Commander in Chief, Allied Forces Southern Europe (CINCSOUTH), 1977–1980.	6	1942 (USNA)	32	(1918–1999) Administrator, U.S. Maritime Administration, 1981–1985.
126	John P. Weinel		2 Aug 1974	U.S. Military Representative, NATO Military Committee (USMILREP), 1974–1977.	3	1939 (USNA)	35	(1916–2004)
127	Frederick H. Michaelis		19 Apr 1975	Chief of Naval Material (CNM), 1975–1978.	3	1940 (USNA)	35	(1917–1992)
128	David H. Bagley		21 May 1975	Commander in Chief, U.S. Naval Forces Europe (CINCUSNAVEUR), 1975–1977.	2	1943 (USNA)	32	(1920–1992) Son of Navy four-star admiral David W. Bagley; brother of Navy four-star admiral Worth H. Bagley; great-aunt married Navy five-star admiral William D. Leahy; great-aunt married U.S. Secretary of the Navy Josephus Daniels.
129	Stansfield Turner		1 Sep 1975	Commander in Chief, Allied Forces Southern Europe (CINCSOUTH), 1975–1977.; Director of Central Intelligence (DCI), 1977–1981.	4	1946 (USNA)	29	(1923–2018) President, Naval War College, 1972–1974.
130	Daniel J. Murphy		28 May 1976	Deputy to the Director of Central Intelligence for the Intelligence Community (D/DCI/IC), 1976–1977.	1	1943 (OCS)	33	(1922–2001) U.S. Deputy Undersecretary of Defense for Policy, 1977–1981; Chief of Staff to the U.S. Vice President, 1981–1985.
131	Thomas B. Hayward		12 Aug 1976	Commander in Chief, U.S. Pacific Fleet (CINCPACFLT), 1976–1978.; Chief of Naval Operations (CNO), 1978–1982.	6	1947 (USNA)	29	(1924–2022)
132	Robert L. J. Long		5 Jul 1977	Vice Chief of Naval Operations (VCNO), 1977–1979.; Commander in Chief, Pacific Command (CINCPAC), 1979–1983.	6	1943 (USNA)	34	(1920–2002)
133	Donald C. Davis		9 May 1978	Commander in Chief, U.S. Pacific Fleet (CINCPACFLT), 1978–1981.	3	1943 (USNA)	35	(1921–1998)
134	Alfred J. Whittle Jr.		1 Aug 1978	Chief of Naval Material (CNM), 1978–1981.	3	1945 (USNA)	33	(1924–1993)
135	Harry D. Train II		1 Oct 1978	Supreme Allied Commander Atlantic/Commander in Chief, Atlantic Command/Commander in Chief, U.S. Atlantic Fleet (SACLANT/CINCLANT/CINCLANTFLT), 1978–1982.	4	1949 (USNA)	29	(1927–2026)
136	James D. Watkins		18 Sep 1979	Vice Chief of Naval Operations (VCNO), 1979–1981.; Commander in Chief, U.S. Pacific Fleet (CINCPACFLT), 1981–1982.; Chief of Naval Operations (CNO), 1982–1986.	7	1949 (USNA)	30	(1927–2012) Chairman, Watkins Commission, 1987–1988; U.S. Secretary of Energy, 1989–1993.
137	William J. Crowe Jr.		30 May 1980	Commander in Chief, Allied Forces Southern Europe (CINCSOUTH), 1980–1983.; Commander in Chief, U.S. Naval Forces Europe/Commander in Chief, Allied Forces Southern Europe (CINCUSNAVEUR/CINCSOUTH), 1983.; Commander in Chief, Pacific Command (CINCPAC), 1983.; Commander in Chief, U.S. Pacific Command (USCINCPAC), 1983–1985.; Chairman, Joint Chiefs of Staff (CJCS), 1985–1989.	9	1947 (USNA)	33	(1925–2007) Chairman, President's Intelligence Advisory Board, 1993–1994; U.S. Ambassador to the United Kingdom, 1994–1997. Awarded Presidential Medal of Freedom, 2000.
138	Bobby R. Inman		12 Feb 1981	Deputy Director of Central Intelligence (DDCI), 1981–1982.	1	1952 (OCS)	29	(1931– ) Director of Naval Intelligence, 1974–1976; Director, National Security Agency, 1977–1981. First naval intelligence specialist to attain rank of admiral.
139	William N. Small		1 Jul 1981	Vice Chief of Naval Operations (VCNO), 1981–1983.; Commander in Chief, U.S. Naval Forces Europe/Commander in Chief, Allied Forces Southern Europe (CINCUSNAVEUR/CINCSOUTH), 1983–1985.	4	1948 (USNA)	33	(1927–2016)
140	John G. Williams Jr.		1 Jul 1981	Chief of Naval Material (CNM), 1981–1983.	2	1947 (USNA)	34	(1924–1991)
141	George E.R. Kinnear II		31 Jul 1981	U.S. Military Representative, NATO Military Committee (USMILREP), 1981–1982.	1	1948 (OCS)	33	(1928–2015)
142	Kinnaird R. McKee		2 Mar 1982	Director, Naval Nuclear Propulsion Program/Deputy Assistant Secretary for Naval Reactors, U.S. Department of Energy, 1982–1988.	6	1951 (USNA)	31	(1929–2013) Superintendent, U.S. Naval Academy, 1975–1978.
143	Sylvester R. Foley Jr.		28 May 1982	Commander in Chief, U.S. Pacific Fleet (CINCPACFLT), 1982–1985.	3	1950 (USNA)	32	(1928–2019) U.S. Assistant Secretary of Energy for Defense Programs, 1985–1988.
144	Wesley L. McDonald		1 Oct 1982	Supreme Allied Commander Atlantic/Commander in Chief, Atlantic Command/Commander in Chief, U.S. Atlantic Fleet (SACLANT/CINCLANT/CINCLANTFLT), 1982–1983.; Supreme Allied Commander Atlantic/Commander in Chief, U.S. Atlantic Command/Commander in Chief, U.S. Atlantic Fleet (SACLANT/USCINCLANT/CINCLANTFLT), 1983–1985.	3	1946 (USNA)	36	(1924–2009)
145	Ronald J. Hays		29 Apr 1983	Vice Chief of Naval Operations (VCNO), 1983–1985.; Commander in Chief, U.S. Pacific Command (USCINCPAC), 1985–1988.	5	1950 (USNA)	33	(1928–2021)
146	Steven A. White		1 Aug 1983	Chief of Naval Material (CNM), 1983–1985.	2	1952 (NROTC)	31	(1928–2021) Manager of Nuclear Power, Tennessee Valley Authority, 1986–1988.
147	Lee Baggett Jr.		30 May 1985	Commander in Chief, U.S. Naval Forces Europe/Commander in Chief, Allied Forces Southern Europe (CINCUSNAVEUR/CINCSOUTH), 1985.; Supreme Allied Commander Atlantic/Commander in Chief, U.S. Atlantic Command (SACLANT/USCINCLANT), 1985–1988.	3	1950 (USNA)	35	(1927–1999)
148	James A. Lyons Jr.		16 Sep 1985	Commander in Chief, U.S. Pacific Fleet (CINCPACFLT), 1985–1987.	2	1952 (USNA)	33	(1927–2018)
149	Carlisle A.H. Trost		4 Oct 1985	Commander in Chief, U.S. Atlantic Fleet/Deputy Commander in Chief, U.S. Atlantic Command (CINCLANTFLT/DCINCLANT), 1985–1986.; Chief of Naval Operations (CNO), 1986–1990.	5	1953 (USNA)	32	(1930–2020)
150	James B. Busey IV		17 Oct 1985	Vice Chief of Naval Operations (VCNO), 1985–1987.; Commander in Chief, U.S. Naval Forces Europe/Commander in Chief, Allied Forces Southern Europe (CINCUSNAVEUR/CINCSOUTH), 1987–1989.	4	1954 (NAVCAD)	31	(1932–2023) Administrator, Federal Aviation Administration, 1989–1991; U.S. Deputy Secretary of Transportation, 1991–1992.
151	Arthur S. Moreau Jr.		15 Nov 1985	Commander in Chief, U.S. Naval Forces Europe/Commander in Chief, Allied Forces Southern Europe (CINCUSNAVEUR/CINCSOUTH), 1985–1986.	1	1953 (USNA)	32	(1931–1986) Died in office.
152	Frank B. Kelso II		13 Jun 1986	Commander in Chief, U.S. Atlantic Fleet/Deputy Commander in Chief, U.S. Atlantic Command (CINCLANTFLT/DCINCLANT), 1986.; Commander in Chief, U.S. Atlantic Fleet (CINCLANTFLT), 1986–1988.; Supreme Allied Commander Atlantic/Commander in Chief, U.S. Atlantic Command (SACLANT/USCINCLANT), 1988–1990.; Chief of Naval Operations (CNO), 1990–1994.	8	1956 (USNA)	30	(1933–2013)
153	Huntington Hardisty		11 Mar 1987	Vice Chief of Naval Operations (VCNO), 1987–1988.; Commander in Chief, U.S. Pacific Command (USCINCPAC), 1988–1991.	4	1952 (USNA)	35	(1929–2003) President, Naval War College, 1977.
154	Powell F. Carter Jr.		1 Oct 1987	U.S. Military Representative, NATO Military Committee (USMILREP), 1987–1988.; Commander in Chief, U.S. Atlantic Fleet (CINCLANTFLT), 1988–1991.	4	1955 (USNA)	32	(1931–2017)
155	David E. Jeremiah		1 Oct 1987	Commander in Chief, U.S. Pacific Fleet (CINCPACFLT), 1987–1990.; Vice Chairman, Joint Chiefs of Staff (VJCS), 1990–1994.	7	1956 (OCS)	32	(1934–2013)
156	Leon A. Edney		1 Oct 1988	Vice Chief of Naval Operations (VCNO), 1988–1990.; Supreme Allied Commander Atlantic/Commander in Chief, U.S. Atlantic Command (SACLANT/USCINCLANT), 1990–1992.	4	1957 (USNA)	31	(1935– )
157	Bruce DeMars		1 Nov 1988	Director, Naval Nuclear Propulsion Program/Deputy Assistant Secretary for Naval Reactors, U.S. Department of Energy, 1988–1996.	8	1957 (USNA)	31	(1935–2024)
158	James R. Hogg		1 Dec 1988	U.S. Military Representative, NATO Military Committee (USMILREP), 1988–1991.	3	1956 (USNA)	32	(1934–2025)
159	Jonathan T. Howe		1 Jun 1989	Commander in Chief, U.S. Naval Forces Europe/Commander in Chief, Allied Forces Southern Europe (CINCUSNAVEUR/CINCSOUTH), 1989–1991.; Deputy National Security Advisor, 1991–1993.	3	1957 (USNA)	32	(1935– ) U.S. Assistant Secretary of State for Politico-Military Affairs, 1982–1984; Special Representative of the U.N. Secretary General for Somalia, 1993–1994.
160	Charles R. Larson		1 Mar 1990	Commander in Chief, U.S. Pacific Fleet (CINCPACFLT), 1990–1991.; Commander in Chief, U.S. Pacific Command (USCINCPAC), 1991–1994.; Superintendent, U.S. Naval Academy, 1994–1998.	8	1958 (USNA)	32	(1936–2014) Superintendent, U.S. Naval Academy, 1983–1986; Democratic Party nominee for Lieutenant Governor of Maryland, 2002.
161	Jerome L. Johnson		1 Jul 1990	Vice Chief of Naval Operations (VCNO), 1990–1992.	2	1956 (NROTC)	34	(1935– )
162	Paul D. Miller		1 Feb 1991	Commander in Chief, U.S. Atlantic Fleet (CINCLANTFLT), 1991–1992.; Supreme Allied Commander Atlantic/Commander in Chief, U.S. Atlantic Command (SACLANT/USCINCLANT), 1992–1993.; Supreme Allied Commander Atlantic/Commander in Chief, U.S. Atlantic Command (SACLANT/USCINCACOM), 1993–1994.	3	1964 (OCS)	27	(1941– )
163	William D. Smith		22 Feb 1991	U.S. Military Representative, NATO Military Committee (USMILREP), 1991–1993.	2	1955 (USNA)	36	(1933–2020)
164	Robert J. Kelly		1 Mar 1991	Commander in Chief, U.S. Pacific Fleet (CINCPACFLT), 1991–1994.	3	1959 (USNA)	32	(1938– )
165	Jeremy M. Boorda		2 Mar 1992	Commander in Chief, U.S. Naval Forces Europe/Commander in Chief, Allied Forces Southern Europe (CINCUSNAVEUR/CINCSOUTH), 1991–1994.; Chief of Naval Operations (CNO), 1994–1996.	4	1962 (OCS)	30	(1938–1996) Died in office.
166	William O. Studeman		9 Apr 1992	Deputy Director of Central Intelligence (DDCI), 1992–1995.	3	1962 (NROTC)	30	(1940– ), Director of Naval Intelligence, 1985–1988; Director, National Security Agency, 1988–1992. Father of Navy rear admiral Michael W. Studeman.
167	Stanley R. Arthur		6 Jul 1992	Vice Chief of Naval Operations (VCNO), 1992–1995.	3	1957 (NROTC)	35	(1935– )
168	Henry H. Mauz Jr.		1 Aug 1992	Commander in Chief, U.S. Atlantic Fleet (CINCLANTFLT), 1992–1994.	2	1959 (USNA)	33	(1936– )
169	Henry G. Chiles Jr.		14 Feb 1994	Commander in Chief, U.S. Strategic Command (USCINCSTRAT), 1994–1996.	2	1960 (USNA)	34	(1938– )
170	William A. Owens		1 Mar 1994	Vice Chairman, Joint Chiefs of Staff (VJCS), 1994–1996.	2	1962 (USNA)	32	(1940– )
171	Leighton W. Smith Jr.		1 May 1994	Commander in Chief, U.S. Naval Forces Europe/Commander in Chief, Allied Forces Southern Europe (CINCUSNAVEUR/CINCSOUTH), 1994–1996.	2	1962 (USNA)	32	(1939– ) Nephew of Navy four-star admiral Harold Page Smith.
172	Richard C. Macke		1 Oct 1994	Commander in Chief, U.S. Pacific Command (USCINCPAC), 1994–1996.	2	1960 (USNA)	34	(1938–2022) Relieved, 1996.
173	Ronald J. Zlatoper		5 Oct 1994	Commander in Chief, U.S. Pacific Fleet (CINCPACFLT), 1994–1996.	2	1963 (NROTC)	31	(1941–2022)
174	William J. Flanagan Jr.		1 Nov 1994	Commander in Chief, U.S. Atlantic Fleet (CINCLANTFLT), 1994–1996.	2	1964 (MMA)	30	(1943– )
175	Joseph W. Prueher		1 Jun 1995	Vice Chief of Naval Operations (VCNO), 1995–1996.; Commander in Chief, U.S. Pacific Command (USCINCPAC), 1996–1999.	4	1964 (USNA)	31	(1942– ) U.S. Ambassador to China, 1999–2001.
176	Jay L. Johnson		1 Apr 1996	Vice Chief of Naval Operations (VCNO), 1996.; Chief of Naval Operations (CNO), 1996–2000.	4	1968 (USNA)	28	(1946– )
177	Thomas J. Lopez		31 Jul 1996	Commander in Chief, U.S. Naval Forces Europe/Commander in Chief, Allied Forces Southern Europe (CINCUSNAVEUR/CINCSOUTH), 1996–1998.	2	1964 (NROTC)	32	(1940– )
178	Frank L. Bowman		1 Oct 1996	Director, Naval Nuclear Propulsion Program/Deputy Assistant Secretary for Naval Reactors, U.S. Department of Energy, 1996–2000.; Director, Naval Nuclear Propulsion Program/Deputy Administrator for Naval Reactors, National Nuclear Security Administration (NAVSEA 08/NNSA NA-30), 2000–2004.	8	1966 (NROTC)	30	(1944– )
179	Harold W. Gehman Jr.		1 Oct 1996	Vice Chief of Naval Operations (VCNO), 1996–1997.; Supreme Allied Commander Atlantic/Commander in Chief, U.S. Atlantic Command (SACLANT/USCINCACOM), 1997–1999.; Supreme Allied Commander Atlantic/Commander in Chief, U.S. Joint Forces Command (SACLANT/USCINCJFCOM), 1999–2000.	4	1965 (NROTC)	31	(1942– )
180	Archie R. Clemins		1 Jan 1997	Commander in Chief, U.S. Pacific Fleet (CINCPACFLT), 1996–1999.	2	1966 (NROTC)	31	(1943–2020)
181	J. Paul Reason		1 Feb 1997	Commander in Chief, U.S. Atlantic Fleet (CINCLANTFLT), 1996–1999.	2	1965 (USNA)	32	(1941– ) First African-American to achieve the rank of admiral.
182	Donald L. Pilling		30 Oct 1997	Vice Chief of Naval Operations (VCNO), 1997–2000.	3	1965 (USNA)	32	(1943–2008)
183	Richard W. Mies		1 Aug 1998	Commander in Chief, U.S. Strategic Command (USCINCSTRAT), 1998–2001.	3	1967 (USNA)	31	(1944– )
184	Charles S. Abbot		1 Sep 1998	Deputy Commander in Chief, U.S. European Command (DCINCEUR), 1998–2000.	2	1966 (USNA)	32	(1945– ) Deputy Director, Office of Homeland Security, 2001–2003.
185	James O. Ellis		1 Jan 1999	Commander in Chief, U.S. Naval Forces Europe/Commander in Chief, Allied Forces Southern Europe (CINCUSNAVEUR/CINCSOUTH), 1998–2001.; Commander in Chief, U.S. Strategic Command (USCINCSTRAT), 2001–2002.; Commander, U.S. Strategic Command (CDRUSSTRATCOM), 2002–2004.	5	1969 (USNA)	30	(1947– )
186	Dennis C. Blair		1 May 1999	Commander in Chief, U.S. Pacific Command (USCINCPAC), 1999–2002.	3	1968 (USNA)	31	(1946– ) President, Institute for Defense Analyses, 2003–2006; Director of National Intelligence, 2009–2010.
187	Vernon E. Clark		1 Nov 1999	Commander in Chief, U.S. Atlantic Fleet (CINCLANTFLT), 1999–2000.; Chief of Naval Operations (CNO), 2000–2005.	6	1968 (OCS)	31	(1944– )
188	Thomas B. Fargo		1 Dec 1999	Commander in Chief, U.S. Pacific Fleet (CINCPACFLT), 1999–2002.; Commander in Chief, U.S. Pacific Command (USCINCPAC), 2002.; Commander, U.S. Pacific Command (CDRUSPACOM), 2002–2005.	6	1970 (USNA)	29	(1948– )
189	Robert J. Natter		1 Sep 2000	Commander in Chief, U.S. Atlantic Fleet (CINCLANTFLT), 2000–2001.; Commander in Chief, U.S. Atlantic Fleet/Commander, Fleet Forces Command (CINCLANTFLT/CFFC), 2001–2002.; Commander, Fleet Forces Command/Commander, U.S. Atlantic Fleet (CFFC/COMLANTFLT), 2002–2003.	3	1967 (USNA)	33	(1945– )
190	William J. Fallon		1 Nov 2000	Vice Chief of Naval Operations (VCNO), 2000–2003.; Commander, Fleet Forces Command/Commander, U.S. Atlantic Fleet (CFFC/COMLANTFLT), 2003–2005.; Commander, U.S. Pacific Command (CDRUSPACOM), 2005–2007.; Commander, U.S. Central Command (CDRUSCENTCOM), 2007–2008.	8	1967 (NROTC)	33	(1944– ) Resigned, 2008.
191	Gregory G. Johnson		24 Oct 2001	Commander in Chief, U.S. Naval Forces Europe/Commander in Chief, Allied Forces Southern Europe (CINCUSNAVEUR/CINCSOUTH), 2001–2002.; Commander, U.S. Naval Forces Europe/Commander in Chief, Allied Forces Southern Europe (COMUSNAVEUR/CINCSOUTH), 2002–2004.; Commander, U.S. Naval Forces Europe/Commander, Allied Joint Force Command Naples (COMUSNAVEUR/COMJFC Naples), 2004.	3	1969 (NROTC)	32	(1946– )
192	Walter F. Doran		4 May 2002	Commander in Chief, U.S. Pacific Fleet (CINCPACFLT), 2002.; Commander, U.S. Pacific Fleet (COMPACFLT), 2002–2005.	3	1967 (NROTC)	35	(1945– )
193	Edmund P. Giambastiani Jr.		2 Oct 2002	Supreme Allied Commander Atlantic/Commander, U.S. Joint Forces Command (SACLANT/CDRUSJFCOM), 2002–2003.; Supreme Allied Commander Transformation/Commander, U.S. Joint Forces Command (SACT/CDRUSJFCOM), 2003–2005.; Vice Chairman, Joint Chiefs of Staff (VJCS), 2005–2007.	5	1970 (USNA)	32	(1948– )
194	Michael G. Mullen		28 Aug 2003	Vice Chief of Naval Operations (VCNO), 2003–2004.; Commander, U.S. Naval Forces Europe/Commander, Allied Joint Force Command Naples (COMUSNAVEUR/COMJFC Naples), 2004–2005.; Chief of Naval Operations (CNO), 2005–2007.; Chairman, Joint Chiefs of Staff (CJCS), 2007–2011.	8	1968 (USNA)	35	(1946– )
195	John B. Nathman		1 Dec 2004	Vice Chief of Naval Operations (VCNO), 2004–2005.; Commander, Fleet Forces Command/Commander, U.S. Atlantic Fleet (CFFC/COMLANTFLT), 2005–2006.; Commander, U.S. Fleet Forces Command (COMUSFLTFORCOM), 2006–2007.	3	1970 (USNA)	34	(1948– )
196	Timothy J. Keating		1 Jan 2005	Commander, U.S. Northern Command/Commander, North American Aerospace Defense Command (CDRUSNORTHCOM/CDRNORAD), 2004–2007.; Commander, U.S. Pacific Command (CDRUSPACOM), 2007–2009.	5	1971 (USNA)	34	(1949– )
197	Kirkland H. Donald		1 Jan 2005	Director, Naval Nuclear Propulsion Program/Deputy Administrator for Naval Reactors, National Nuclear Security Administration (NAVSEA 08/NNSA NA-30), 2004–2012.	8	1975 (USNA)	30	(1953– )
198	Robert F. Willard		18 Mar 2005	Vice Chief of Naval Operations (VCNO), 2005–2007.; Commander, U.S. Pacific Fleet (COMPACFLT), 2007–2009.; Commander, U.S. Pacific Command (CDRUSPACOM), 2009–2012.	7	1973 (USNA)	32	(1950– )
199	Henry G. Ulrich III		22 Jul 2005	Commander, U.S. Naval Forces Europe/Commander, Allied Joint Force Command Naples (COMUSNAVEUR/COMJFC Naples), 2005–2007.	2	1972 (USNA)	33	(1950– )
200	Gary Roughead		1 Sep 2005	Commander, U.S. Pacific Fleet (COMPACFLT), 2005–2007.; Commander, U.S. Fleet Forces Command (COMUSFLTFORCOM), 2007.; Chief of Naval Operations (CNO), 2007–2011.	6	1973 (USNA)	32	(1951– )
201	James G. Stavridis		18 Oct 2006	Commander, U.S. Southern Command (CDRUSSOUTHCOM), 2006–2009.; Commander, U.S. European Command/Supreme Allied Commander Europe (CDRUSEUCOM/SACEUR), 2009–2013.	7	1976 (USNA)	30	(1955– ) Dean, The Fletcher School of Law and Diplomacy, 2013–2018.
202	Patrick M. Walsh		5 Apr 2007	Vice Chief of Naval Operations (VCNO), 2007–2009.; Commander, U.S. Pacific Fleet (COMPACFLT), 2009–2012.	5	1977 (USNA)	30	(1955– )
203	Eric T. Olson		6 Jul 2007	Commander, U.S. Special Operations Command (CDRUSSOCOM), 2007–2011.	4	1973 (USNA)	34	(1952– ) First Navy SEAL to achieve the rank of admiral.
204	Jonathan W. Greenert		29 Sep 2007	Commander, U.S. Fleet Forces Command (COMUSFLTFORCOM), 2007–2009.; Vice Chief of Naval Operations (VCNO), 2009–2011.; Chief of Naval Operations (CNO), 2011–2015.	8	1975 (USNA)	32	(1953– )
205	Mark P. Fitzgerald		30 Nov 2007	Commander, U.S. Naval Forces Europe/Commander, Allied Joint Force Command Naples (COMUSNAVEUR/COMJFC Naples), 2007–2009.; Commander, U.S. Naval Forces Europe/Commander, U.S. Naval Forces Africa/Commander, Allied Joint Force Command Naples (COMUSNAVEUR/COMUSNAVAF/COMJFC Naples), 2009–2010.	3	1973 (NROTC)	34	(1951– )
206	John C. Harvey Jr.		24 Jul 2009	Commander, U.S. Fleet Forces Command (COMUSFLTFORCOM), 2009–2012.	3	1973 (USNA)	36	(1951– ) Virginia Secretary of Veterans and Defense Affairs, 2014–2017.
207	James A. Winnefeld Jr.		19 May 2010	Commander, U.S. Northern Command/Commander, North American Aerospace Defense Command (CDRUSNORTHCOM/CDRNORAD), 2010–2011.; Vice Chairman, Joint Chiefs of Staff (VJCS), 2011–2015.	5	1978 (NROTC)	32	(1956– ) Chair, President's Intelligence Advisory Board, 2022–2024.
208	Samuel J. Locklear III		6 Oct 2010	Commander, U.S. Naval Forces Europe/Commander, U.S. Naval Forces Africa/Commander, Allied Joint Force Command Naples (COMUSNAVEUR/COMUSNAVAF/COMJFC Naples), 2010–2012.; Commander, U.S. Pacific Command (CDRUSPACOM), 2012–2015.	5	1977 (USNA)	33	(1954– )
209	William H. McRaven		8 Aug 2011	Commander, U.S. Special Operations Command (CDRUSSOCOM), 2011–2014.	3	1977 (NROTC)	34	(1955– ) Chancellor, University of Texas System, 2015–2018.
210	Mark E. Ferguson III		22 Aug 2011	Vice Chief of Naval Operations (VCNO), 2011–2014.; Commander, U.S. Naval Forces Europe/Commander, U.S. Naval Forces Africa/Commander, Allied Joint Force Command Naples (COMUSNAVEUR/COMUSNAVAF/COMJFC Naples), 2014–2016.	5	1978 (USNA)	33	(1956– )
211	Cecil D. Haney		20 Jan 2012	Commander, U.S. Pacific Fleet (COMPACFLT), 2012–2013.; Commander, U.S. Strategic Command (CDRUSSTRATCOM), 2013–2016.	4	1978 (USNA)	34	(1955– )
212	Bruce W. Clingan		24 Feb 2012	Commander, U.S. Naval Forces Europe/Commander, U.S. Naval Forces Africa/Commander, Allied Joint Force Command Naples (COMUSNAVEUR/COMUSNAVAF/COMJFC Naples), 2012–2014.	2	1977 (NROTC)	34	(1955– )
213	William E. Gortney		14 Sep 2012	Commander, U.S. Fleet Forces Command (COMUSFLTFORCOM), 2012–2014.; Commander, U.S. Northern Command/Commander, North American Aerospace Defense Command (CDRUSNORTHCOM/CDRNORAD), 2014–2016.	4	1977 (AOCS)	35	(1955– )
214	John M. Richardson		2 Nov 2012	Director, Naval Nuclear Propulsion Program/Deputy Administrator for Naval Reactors, National Nuclear Security Administration (NAVSEA 08/NNSA NA-30), 2012–2015.; Chief of Naval Operations (CNO), 2015–2019.	7	1982 (USNA)	31	(1960– )
215	Harry B. Harris Jr.		16 Oct 2013	Commander, U.S. Pacific Fleet (COMPACFLT), 2013–2015.; Commander, U.S. Pacific Command (CDRUSPACOM), 2015–2018.	5	1978 (USNA)	35	(1956– ) U.S. Ambassador to South Korea, 2018–2021. First Asian-American to achieve the rank of admiral.
216	Michael S. Rogers		3 Apr 2014	Commander, U.S. Cyber Command/Director, National Security Agency/Chief, Central Security Service (COMUSCYBERCOM/DIRNSA/CCSS), 2014–2018.	4	1981 (NROTC)	33	(1959– ) First Information Warfare Community officer to achieve the rank of admiral.
217	Michelle J. Howard		1 Jul 2014	Vice Chief of Naval Operations (VCNO), 2014–2016.; Commander, U.S. Naval Forces Europe – Naval Forces Africa/Commander, Allied Joint Force Command Naples (COMUSNAVEUR-NAVAF & COMJFC Naples), 2016–2017.	3	1982 (USNA)	32	(1960– ) Chair, The Naming Commission, 2021–2022. First woman to achieve the rank of admiral.
218	Philip S. Davidson		19 Dec 2014	Commander, U.S. Fleet Forces Command/Commander, U.S. Naval Forces Northern Command (COMUSFLTFORCOM/COMUSNAVNORTHCOM), 2014–2018.; Commander, U.S. Indo-Pacific Command (CDRUSINDOPACOM), 2018–2021.	7	1982 (USNA)	32	(1960– )
219	Scott H. Swift		27 May 2015	Commander, U.S. Pacific Fleet (COMPACFLT), 2015–2018.	3	1979 (AOCS)	36	(1957– )
220	James F. Caldwell Jr.		14 Aug 2015	Director, Naval Nuclear Propulsion Program/Deputy Administrator for Naval Reactors, National Nuclear Security Administration (NAVSEA 08/NNSA NA-30), 2015–2024.	9	1981 (USNA)	34	(1959– ) Great-grandson of Navy four-star admiral Jehu V. Chase.
221	Kurt W. Tidd		14 Jan 2016	Commander, U.S. Southern Command (CDRUSSOUTHCOM), 2016–2018.	2	1978 (USNA)	38	(1956– )
222	William F. Moran		31 May 2016	Vice Chief of Naval Operations (VCNO), 2016–2019.	3	1981 (USNA)	35	(1958– )
223	James G. Foggo III		20 Oct 2017	Commander, U.S. Naval Forces Europe-Africa/Commander, Allied Joint Force Command Naples (COMCNE-CNA & COMJFC Naples), 2017–2020.	3	1981 (USNA)	36	(1959– )
224	Christopher W. Grady		4 May 2018	Commander, U.S. Fleet Forces Command/Commander, U.S. Naval Forces Northern Command (COMUSFLTFORCOM/COMUSNAVYNORTH), 2018–2019.; Commander, U.S. Fleet Forces Command/Commander, U.S. Naval Forces Northern Command/Commander, U.S. Naval Forces Strategic Command/Joint Force Maritime Component Commander (COMUSFLTFORCOM/COMUSNAVYNORTH/NAVSTRAT/JFMCC), 2019–2021.; Vice Chairman, Joint Chiefs of Staff (VJCS), 2021–2025.	7	1984 (NROTC)	34	(1962– )
225	John C. Aquilino		17 May 2018	Commander, U.S. Pacific Fleet (COMPACFLT), 2018–2021.; Commander, U.S. Indo-Pacific Command (CDRUSINDOPACOM), 2021–2024.	6	1984 (USNA)	34	(1961– )
226	Craig S. Faller		26 Nov 2018	Commander, U.S. Southern Command (CDRUSSOUTHCOM), 2018–2021.	3	1983 (USNA)	35	(1961– )
227	Robert P. Burke		10 Jun 2019	Vice Chief of Naval Operations (VCNO), 2019–2020.; Commander, U.S. Naval Forces Europe-Africa/Commander, Allied Joint Force Command Naples (COMCNE-CNA & COMJFC Naples), 2020–2022.	3	1983 (NROTC)	36	(1962– )
228	Michael M. Gilday		22 Aug 2019	Chief of Naval Operations (CNO), 2019–2023.	4	1985 (USNA)	34	(1962– )
229	Charles A. Richard		18 Nov 2019	Commander, U.S. Strategic Command (CDRUSSTRATCOM), 2019–2022.	3	1982 (OCS)	37	(1959– )
230	William K. Lescher		29 May 2020	Vice Chief of Naval Operations (VCNO), 2020–2022.	2	1980 (USNA)	40	(1958– )
231	Samuel J. Paparo Jr.		5 May 2021	Commander, U.S. Pacific Fleet (COMPACFLT), 2021–2024.; Commander, U.S. Indo-Pacific Command (CDRUSINDOPACOM), 2024–2026.; Commander, U.S. Pacific Command (CDRUSPACOM), 2026–present.	5	1987 (NROTC)	34	(1964– )
232	Daryl L. Caudle		7 Dec 2021	Commander, U.S. Fleet Forces Command/Commander, U.S. Naval Forces Northern Command/Commander, U.S. Naval Forces Strategic Command/Joint Force Maritime Component Commander (COMUSFLTFORCOM/COMUSNAVYNORTH/NAVSTRAT/JFMCC), 2021–2025.; Chief of Naval Operations (CNO), 2025–present.	5	1985 (OCS)	36	(1963– )
233	Stuart B. Munsch		27 Jun 2022	Commander, U.S. Naval Forces Europe-Africa/Commander, Allied Joint Force Command Naples (COMCNE-CNA & COMJFC Naples), 2022–2025.	3	1985 (USNA)	37	(1962– )
234	Lisa M. Franchetti		2 Sep 2022	Vice Chief of Naval Operations (VCNO), 2022–2023.; Chief of Naval Operations (CNO), 2023–2025.	3	1985 (NROTC)	37	(1964– ) Relieved, 2025.
235	James W. Kilby		5 Jan 2024	Vice Chief of Naval Operations (VCNO), 2024–present.	2	1986 (USNA)	38	(1963– )
236	William J. Houston		10 Jan 2024	Director, Naval Nuclear Propulsion Program/Deputy Administrator for Naval Reactors, National Nuclear Security Administration (NAVSEA 08/NNSA NA-30), 2024–present.	2	1990 (NROTC)	34	(1968– )
237	Stephen T. Koehler		5 Apr 2024	Commander, U.S. Pacific Fleet (COMPACFLT), 2024–present.	2	1986 (NROTC)	38	(1964– )
238	Alvin Holsey		7 Nov 2024	Commander, U.S. Southern Command (CDRUSSOUTHCOM), 2024–2025.	1	1988 (NROTC)	36	(1965– ) Resigned, 2025.
239	Charles B. Cooper II		8 Aug 2025	Commander, U.S. Central Command (CDRUSCENTCOM), 2025–present.	1	1989 (USNA)	36	(1967– )
240	Frank M. Bradley		3 Oct 2025	Commander, U.S. Special Operations Command (CDRUSSOCOM), 2025–present.	1	1991 (USNA)	34	
241	George M. Wikoff		18 Nov 2025	Commander, U.S. Naval Forces Europe-Africa/Commander, Allied Joint Force Command Naples (COMCNE-CNA & COMJFC Naples), 2025–present.	1	1990 (NROTC)	35	(1968– )
242	Karl O. Thomas		1 Dec 2025	Commander, U.S. Fleet Forces Command (COMUSFLTFORCOM), 2025–present.	1	1986 (NROTC)	39	(1963– )
243	Richard A. Correll		5 Dec 2025	Commander, U.S. Strategic Command (CDRUSSTRATCOM), 2025–present.	1	1986 (NROTC)	39	(1964– )

=== Tombstone admirals ===
The Act of Congress of 4 March 1925, allowed officers in the Navy, Marine Corps, and Coast Guard to be promoted one grade upon retirement if they had been specially commended for performance of duty in actual combat. Combat citation promotions were colloquially known as "tombstone promotions" because they conferred all the perks and prestige of the higher rank including the loftier title on their tombstones but no additional retirement pay. The Act of Congress of 23 February 1942, enabled tombstone promotions to three- and four-star grades. Tombstone promotions were subsequently restricted to citations issued before 1 January 1947, and finally eliminated altogether effective 1 November 1959.

Any admiral who actually served in a grade while on active duty receives precedence on the retired list over any tombstone admiral holding the same retired grade. Tombstone admirals rank among each other according to the dates of their highest active duty grade.

	Name	Photo	Date of rank (VADM)	Date retired	Commission	Notes
1	William L. Calhoun		16 Jun 1942	Dec 1946	1906 (USNA)	(1885–1963) Great-grandson of U.S. Vice President John C. Calhoun.
2	Frank J. Fletcher		26 Jun 1942	May 1947	1906 (USNA)	(1885–1973) Awarded Medal of Honor, 1914. Nephew of Navy four-star admiral Frank F. Fletcher.
3	Aubrey W. Fitch		28 Dec 1942	Jul 1947	1906 (USNA)	(1883–1948) Superintendent, U.S. Naval Academy, 1945–1947.
4	John Howard Hoover		1 Jan 1943	Jul 1948	1906 (USNA)	(1887–1970)
5	Alan G. Kirk		10 Sep 1944	Mar 1946	1909 (USNA)	(1888–1963) Director of Naval Intelligence, 1941; U.S. Ambassador to Belgium and Luxembourg, 1946–1947; to Soviet Union, 1949–1952; to China, 1962–1963.
6	George D. Murray		29 Nov 1944	Aug 1951	1911 (USNA)	(1889–1956)
7	Jesse B. Oldendorf		7 Dec 1944	Sep 1948	1909 (USNA)	(1887–1974)
8	Arthur S. Carpender		3 Apr 1945	Nov 1946	1908 (USNA)	(1884–1959) Superintendent, Admiral Farragut Academy, 1948–19??
9	Harry W. Hill		22 Apr 1945	May 1952	1911 (USNA)	(1890–1971) Superintendent, U.S. Naval Academy, 1950–1952; Governor, U.S. Naval Home, 1952–1954.
10	Frederick C. Sherman		13 Jul 1945	Mar 1947	1910 (USNA)	(1880–1957)
11	John L. Hall Jr.		10 Dec 1945	May 1953	1913 (USNA)	(1891–1978)
12	Oscar C. Badger II		13 Dec 1945	Jun 1952	1911 (USNA)	(1890–1958) Awarded Medal of Honor, 1914. Cousin of U.S. Secretary of the Navy George E. Badger.
13	John D. Price		31 Aug 1946	Jun 1954	1916 (USNA)	(1892–1957)
14	Francis S. Low		12 Mar 1947	Jul 1956	1915 (USNA)	(1894–1964)
15	David W. Bagley		1 Apr 1947	Apr 1947	1904 (USNA)	(1883–1960) Father of Navy four-star admiral David H. Bagley and Navy four-star admiral Worth H. Bagley; grandson of North Carolina Governor Jonathan Worth; aunt married U.S. Secretary of the Navy Josephus Daniels; wife's aunt married Navy five-star admiral William D. Leahy.
16	Harold B. Sallada		11 May 1947	Oct 1949	1917 (USNA)	(1895–1977)
17	Arthur D. Struble		26 Apr 1948	Jul 1956	1915 (USNA)	(1894–1983)
18	Russell S. Berkey		1 Jul 1948	Sep 1950	1916 (USNA)	(1893–1984)
19	John W. Reeves Jr.		1 Apr 1949	May 1950	1911 (USNA)	(1888–1967) General Manager, Los Angeles International Airport, 1950–1952.
20	C. Turner Joy		1 Aug 1949	Jul 1954	1916 (USNA)	(1895–1956) Superintendent, U.S. Naval Academy, 1952–1954.
21	Thomas L. Sprague		15 Aug 1949	Apr 1952	1917 (USNA)	(1894–1972)
22	John J. Ballentine		1 Nov 1949	May 1954	1917 (USNA)	(1896–1970)
23	Matthias B. Gardner		1 Oct 1950	Aug 1956	1919 (USNA)	(1897–1975)
24	Albert G. Noble		29 Dec 1950	Oct 1951	1917 (USNA)	(1885–1980)
25	Harold M. Martin		1 Feb 1951	Feb 1956	1919 (USNA)	(1896–1972)
26	Arthur C. Davis		12 Feb 1951	Apr 1955	1915 (USNA)	(1893–1965)
27	Laurance T. DuBose		30 Mar 1951	Jun 1955	1913 (USNA)	(1893–1967)
28	James Fife Jr.		9 Aug 1951	Aug 1955	1918 (USNA)	(1897–1975) Director, Mystic Seaport, 1956–1975
29	Frank G. Fahrion		28 Dec 1951	May 1956	1917 (USNA)	(1894–1970)
30	Joseph J. Clark		7 Mar 1952	Dec 1953	1918 (USNA)	(1893–1971)
31	Roscoe F. Good		27 Mar 1953	Mar 1958	1919 (USNA)	(1897–1974)
32	William K. Phillips		28 Jul 1953	Aug 1955	1918 (USNA)	(1894–1986)
33	John E. Gingrich		30 Jul 1953	Oct 1954	1919 (USNA)	(1897–1960)
34	Alfred M. Pride		9 Oct 1953	Oct 1959	1918 (OCS)	(1897–1988)
35	Edmund T. Wooldridge		6 Apr 1954	Aug 1958	1920 (USNA)	(1897–1968)
36	Austin K. Doyle		7 May 1954	Aug 1958	1920 (USNA)	(1898–1970)
37	Stuart S. Murray		7 Dec 1955	Aug 1956	1918 (USNA)	(1898–1980) Nephew of Oklahoma Governor William H. Murray.
38	Cato D. Glover Jr.		8 Dec 1955	Sep 1957	1919 (USNA)	(1897–1988)
39	John M. Will		17 Apr 1956	Jul 1959	1923 (USNA)	(1899–1981)
40	Byron N. Hanlon		1 Nov 1957	Oct 1958	1921 (USNA)	(1900–1977)

== History ==
=== 1866–1941 ===
The rank of admiral was created in 1866 to honor the Civil War achievements of David Farragut. Upon his death, another Civil War hero, David D. Porter Jr., succeeded to the title. In 1873, Congress stated that further vacancies in the grade would not be filled, and the rank lapsed with Porter's death in 1890. Congress revived the rank in 1899 to honor George Dewey, stipulating that the grade would again cease to exist upon his death or retirement. In 1903, Dewey was promoted to the unique rank of Admiral of the Navy, which during his lifetime was considered to be equivalent to an admiral of the fleet, but was later declared to be senior to the five-star grade of fleet admiral.

The Act of 3 March 1915, provided that the commanders in chief of the Atlantic, Pacific, and Asiatic Fleets would have the rank of admiral while so serving, and their seconds in command the rank of vice admiral. In 1916, the Chief of Naval Operations was also made an admiral while so serving, ranking next after the Admiral of the Navy. The ranks of admiral and vice admiral were strictly temporary appointments for the duration of an officer's tour in designated billets, and the temporary admiral reverted to his permanent grade of rear admiral immediately upon vacating the office bearing the title.

In 1917, Congress accommodated the Navy's desire to reorganize the fleet by authorizing the President to appoint three admirals and three vice admirals for any six fleet command positions. All fleet command tours lasted one year except for the commander in chief of the U.S. Fleet, whose term was sometimes renewed for a second year, and the commander in chief of the Asiatic Fleet, whose command was considered a backwater. (The Chief of Naval Operations was appointed for four years.) Officers would typically "fleet up" to admiral or vice admiral for their year of fleet command and then revert to rear admiral to mark time until mandatory retirement.

=== 1941–1991 ===
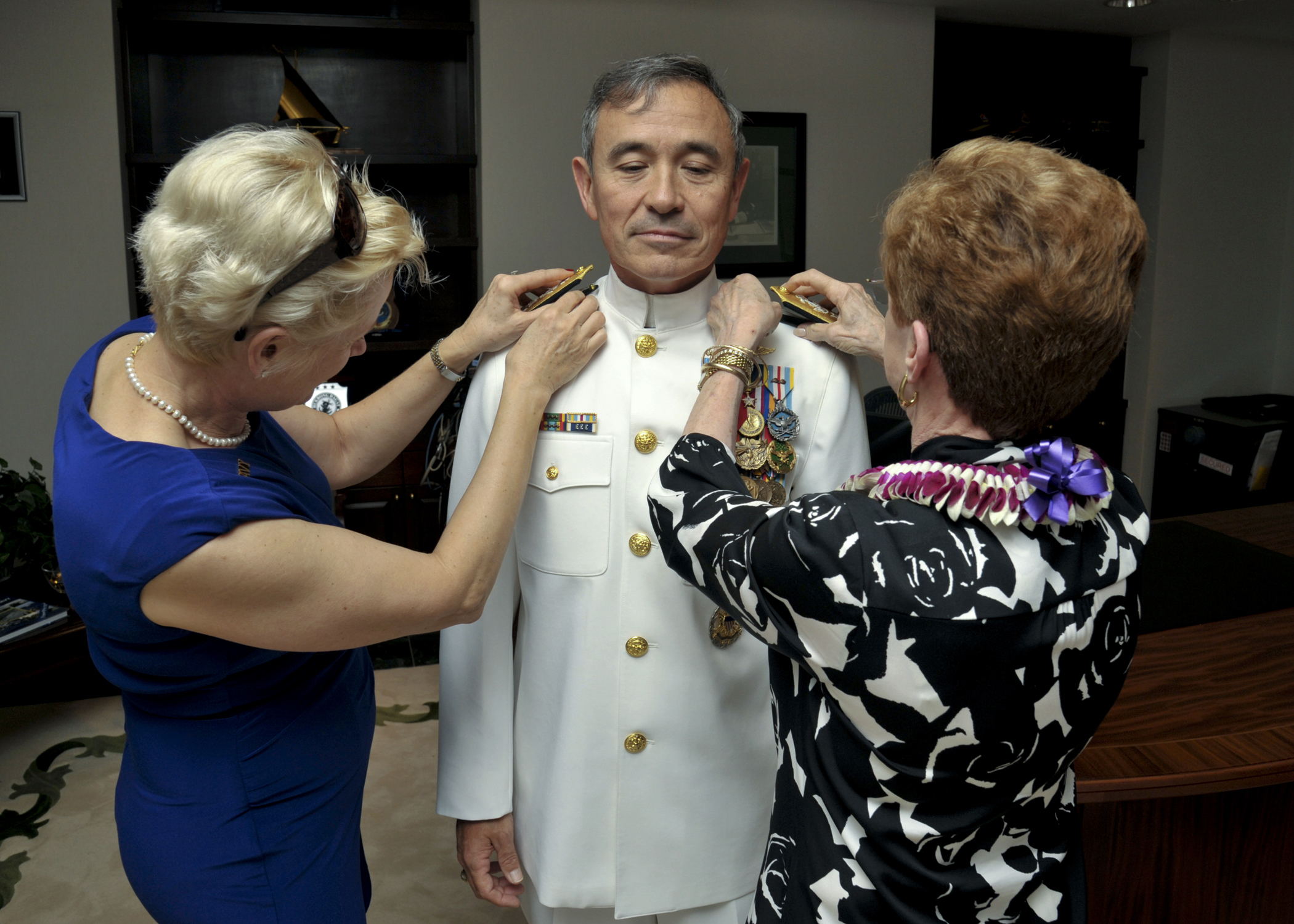
Harry B. Harris, the first Asian-American four-star admiral, is pinned with his new rank on 16 October 2013

During World War II, the President was authorized to create as many admirals and vice admirals as he deemed necessary for the duration of the emergency. Most of these new creations retired at the end of the war, having been promoted to reward service in the fleet or headquarters, or to achieve parity with wartime counterparts. Although three- and four-star ranks remained temporary appointments, the practice of reverting to a lower grade pending retirement largely halted after 1942, when Congress authorized officers to be retired in the highest grade in which they served on active duty. The rank of fleet admiral was created in 1944, and the four officers promoted to that grade were allowed to remain on active duty permanently.

By 1956, the Navy had equilibrated at a total of seven permanent billets bearing four-star rank: the Chief of Naval Operations (CNO); the Vice Chief of Naval Operations (VCNO), the commanders in chief of the unified commands in the Pacific (CINCPAC) and Atlantic (CINCLANT); the commander in chief of the U.S. Pacific Fleet (CINCPACFLT); the commander in chief of U.S. Naval Forces, Eastern Atlantic and Mediterranean (CINCNELM) (retitled commander in chief of U.S. Naval Forces Europe (CINCUSNAVEUR) in 1960); and the commander in chief of North Atlantic Treaty Organization (NATO) forces in Southern Europe (CINCSOUTH). In 1965, an eighth billet was added when the chief of naval material (CNM) was promoted to admiral. Occasionally this count would fluctuate when a Navy officer was selected as the Chairman of the Joint Chiefs of Staff (CJCS), as the chairman's four-star representative to the NATO Military Committee (USMILREP), or as the director or deputy director of central intelligence; or by special legislation.

When the long-serving director of the naval nuclear reactor program, Hyman G. Rickover, was finally compelled to retire in 1982, his successor was promoted to admiral and appointed director of naval nuclear propulsion, institutionalizing the position as a permanent four-star billet. To compensate, another four-star billet was eliminated by merging Allied Forces Southern Europe with U.S. Naval Forces Europe. Similarly, when the U.S. Atlantic Fleet commander (CINCLANTFLT) was separated from the Atlantic unified commander in 1985, the number of four-star billets was conserved by eliminating the chief of naval material position. The U.S. Atlantic Fleet was replaced by U.S. Fleet Forces Command (COMUSFF) in 2006.

=== 1991–present ===
With the end of the Cold War, U.S. Atlantic Command was repurposed as the joint force trainer, becoming U.S. Joint Forces Command in 1999. The change in mission cost the Navy its traditional monopoly over that command, which has since rotated among all the services, but the Navy made up the difference through repeated appointments to other combatant commands and to the vice chairmanship of the Joint Chiefs of Staff (VJCS). All military commanders in chief were retitled "Commanders" in 2002, when the title of "Commander in Chief" was reserved solely to the President of the United States.

== Legislation ==
The following list of Congressional legislation includes major acts of Congress pertaining to appointments to the grade of admiral in the United States Navy.

Legislation	Citation	Summary
Act of 25 July 1866	14 Stat. 222	Authorized 1 grade of admiral (David G. Farragut, David D. Porter) [terminated at next vacancy in 1873 (17 Stat. 418)].
Act of 2 March 1899; Act of 3 March 1899	30 Stat. 995; 30 Stat. 1045	Authorized 1 appointment of an Admiral of the Navy (George Dewey).
Act of 3 March 1915	38 Stat. 941	Authorized rank of admiral for officers designated as commander in chief of the United States Atlantic Fleet, United States Pacific Fleet, or Asiatic Fleet.
Act of 29 August 1916	39 Stat. 558	Increased rank of chief of naval operations to admiral, to rank next after the Admiral of the Navy.
Act of 21 June 1930	46 Stat. 793	Authorized promotion on the retired list or posthumously to highest grade held during World War I, with no increase in retired pay (Henry T. Mayo, William B. Caperton, William S. Benson, William S. Sims, Henry B. Wilson Jr., Hugh Rodman, Albert Gleaves, Robert E. Coontz, Joseph Strauss, Hilary P. Jones).
Act of 14 December 1944	58 Stat. 802	Authorized 4 grades of fleet admiral until six months after the end of World War II [made permanent in 1946 (60 Stat. 59)] (William D. Leahy, Ernest J. King, Chester W. Nimitz, William F. Halsey Jr.).
Act of 7 August 1947 [Officer Personnel Act of 1947]	61 Stat. 874; 61 Stat. 875; 61 Stat. 876	Authorized president to designate, subject to Senate confirmation, Navy officers on the active list to have the grade of admiral while commanding fleets, subdivisions of fleets, or naval units afloat organized to perform a special or unusual mission, or while performing any duty of great importance and responsibility.; Capped Navy officers on the active list in grades above rear admiral at 15 percent of the total number of flag officers authorized in the line of the Regular Navy, of whom not more than 8 to serve in the grade of admiral.; Authorized all Navy officers to retire with the rank but not the pay of the next higher grade if specially commended for performance of duty in actual combat on or before 31 December 1946 [repealed in 1959 (73 Stat. 337)].
Act of 26 June 1948	62 Stat. 1052	Authorized permanent grade of admiral and full active-duty pay and allowances in retirement for Raymond A. Spruance.
Act of 16 November 1973	87 Stat. 621	Authorized promotion of Hyman G. Rickover to admiral on the retired list.
Act of 12 December 1980 [Defense Officer Personnel Management Act]	94 Stat. 2844; 94 Stat. 2849; 94 Stat. 2876	Authorized president to designate positions of importance and responsibility to carry the grade of admiral, to be assigned from officers on active duty in any grade above captain, subject to Senate confirmation, who revert to their permanent grade at the end of their assignment unless it was terminated by; 1. assignment to another position designated to carry the same grade, 2. up to 180 days of hospitalization, or; 3. up to 90 days prior to retirement [reduced to 60 days in 1991 (105 Stat. 1354)].; Capped, except during war or national emergency, Navy officers in grades above rear admiral at 15 percent of all flag officers on active duty, of whom not more than 25 percent to serve in the grade of admiral.; Authorized three- and four-star officers to retire in the highest grade held on active duty, at the discretion of the president and subject to confirmation by the Senate, with no time-in-grade requirement [changed in 1996 to certification by secretary of defense and three-year time-in-grade requirement (110 Stat. 292)].
Act of 28 October 2009	123 Stat. 2273; 123 Stat. 2276	Capped Navy officers in the grade of admiral at 6, exempting from caps up to 20 admirals assigned to joint duty [joint-duty cap repealed in 2016, effective 31 December 2022 (130 Stat. 2100), and lowered in 2021 to 19 (134 Stat. 3563)].

== See also ==
- Admiral (United States)
- List of active duty United States four-star officers
- List of United States Air Force four-star generals
- List of United States Army four-star generals
- List of United States Coast Guard four-star admirals
- List of United States Marine Corps four-star generals
- List of United States military leaders by rank
- List of United States Public Health Service Commissioned Corps four-star admirals
- List of United States Space Force four-star generals
- List of United States Navy vice admirals on active duty before 1960
- List of United States Navy vice admirals from 2000 to 2009
- List of United States Navy vice admirals from 2010 to 2019
- List of United States Navy vice admirals since 2020
- List of female United States military generals and flag officers

== Bibliography ==
- "USAF Almanac 2006 The Air Force in Facts and Figures: Structure of the Force" (PDF). Air & Space Forces Magazine. Vol. 89, no. 5. May 2006. Archived (PDF) from the original on 29 May 2024.
- Cole, Ronald H.; Poole, Walter S.; Schnabel, James F.; Watson, Robert J.; Webb, Willard J. (1995), The History of the Unified Command Plan, 1946–1993 (PDF), Washington D.C.: Office of the Chairman of the Joint Chiefs of Staff, archived from the original (PDF) on 27 November 2007
- Heaton, Dean R. (1995), Four Stars: The Super Stars of United States Military History, Baltimore: Gateway Press
- Naval Historical Center, Dictionary of American Naval Fighting Ships, Washington D.C.: Department of the Navy, archived from the original on 5 October 2001
- Oden, Archibald Jr. (1919), Navy Yearbook, Washington D.C.: U.S. Government Printing Office
- Reynolds, Clark G. (1978), Famous American Admirals, Annapolis: Naval Institute Press
- U.S. Bureau of Naval Personnel (1945–1984), Register of Commissioned and Warrant Officers of the United States Navy and Marine Corps, Washington D.C.: Department of the Navy
- U.S. Bureau of Naval Personnel (1960–1984), Register of Retired Commissioned and Warrant Officers, Regular and Reserve, of the United States Navy and Marine Corps (1945, 1950–1984), Washington D.C.: Department of the Navy
- U.S. Bureau of Naval Personnel (2003), Register of Retired Commissioned and Warrant Officers, Regular and Reserve, of the USN, NAVPERS 15939 (PDF), Washington D.C.: Department of the Navy, archived from the original (PDF) on 28 October 2006
- U.S. Bureau of Naval Personnel (2006), Register of Commissioned and Warrant Officers of the Active Duty List, NAVPERS 15018 (PDF), Washington D.C.: Department of the Navy, archived from the original (PDF) on 28 October 2006
- U.S. Naval Forces Europe/U.S. SIXTH Fleet, "Chronology of Commanders", www.c6f.navy.mil/, archived from the original on 6 January 2008
- Wheeler, Gerald E. (1974), Admiral William Veazie Pratt, U.S. Navy: A Sailor's Life, Washington D.C.: U.S. Government Printing Office
- "World Almanac and Book of Facts 1946–1947, 1977, 1981, 1984, 1988, 1990, 1992, 2004, 2006", World Almanac and Book of Facts, New York: World Almanac Education Group, Inc., 1946–2006
