= Commander, U.S. Fleet Forces Command =

Flag appointment in the United States Navy

- Seal of the commander, U.S. Fleet Forces Command

- Flag of a U.S. Navy four-star admiral

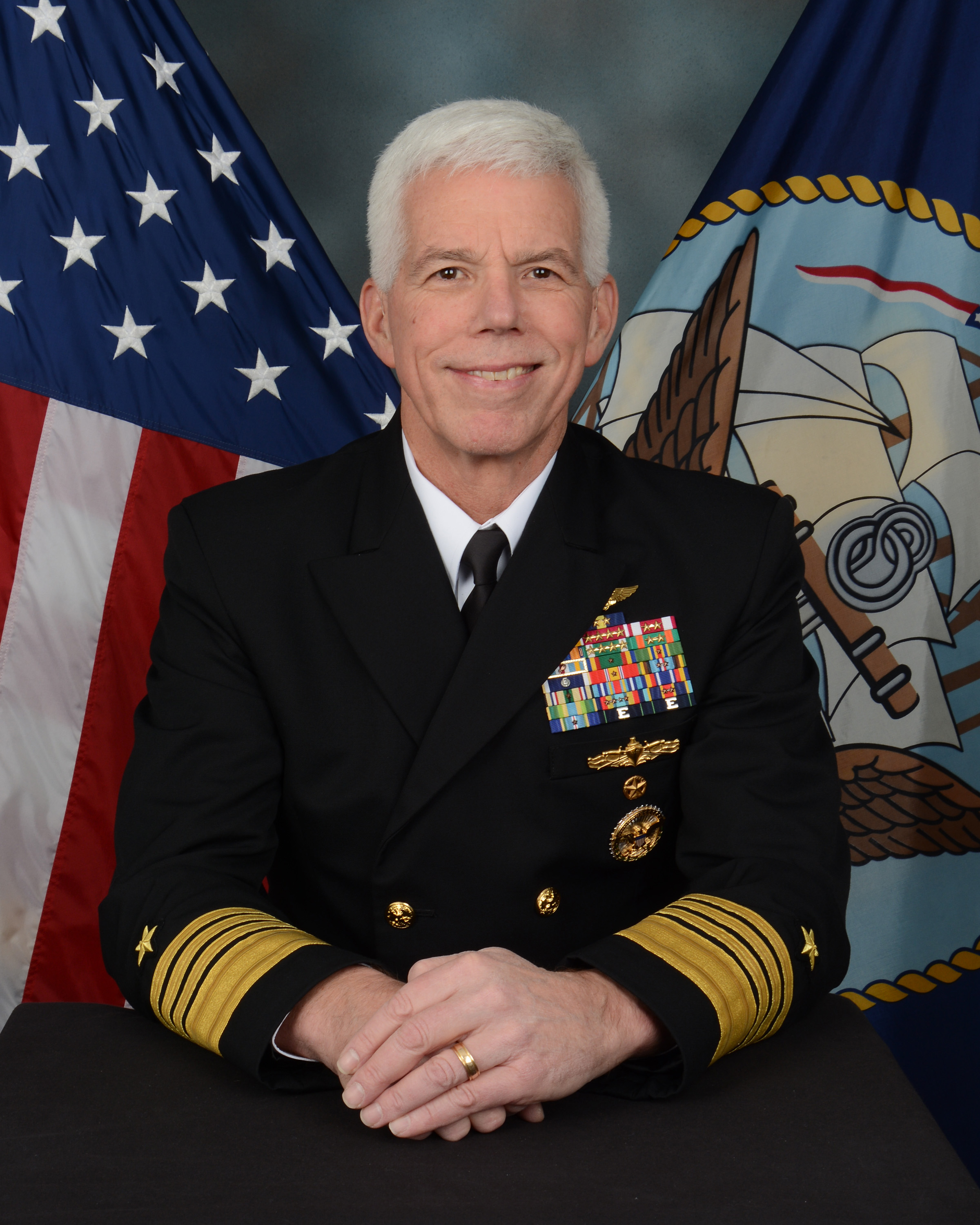
- Incumbent; Admiral Karl O. Thomas since December 01, 2025
- United States Fleet Forces Command
- Abbreviation: COMUSFLTFORCOM; COMUSFFC
- Reports to: Secretary of the Navy (as COMUSFF); Chief of Naval Operations (as COMUSFF); Commander, U.S. Northern Command (as COMUSNAVYNORTH); Commander, U.S. Strategic Command (as COMUSNAVSTRAT)
- Seat: Naval Support Activity Hampton Roads, Virginia, U.S.
- Appointer: The president; with Senate advice and consent
- Term length: 2–3 years; (approx.)
- Formation: January 1, 1906 (as Commander in Chief, Atlantic Fleet); May 22, 2006 (as Commander, U.S. Fleet Forces Command)
- First holder: RADM Robley D. Evans
- Deputy: Deputy Commander, U.S. Fleet Forces Command
- Website: www.usff.navy.mil

Commander, U.S. Fleet Forces Command (COMUSFLTFORCOM or less commonly COMUSFFC) is the title of the United States Navy officer who serves as the commanding officer of the United States Fleet Forces Command (USFFC). The U.S. Fleet Forces Command was originally established in 1905 as the U.S. Atlantic Fleet and as a two-star rear admiral's billet; the position has been held by a four-star admiral since March 10, 1915. The 46th and current commander of U.S. Fleet Forces Command is Admiral Karl O. Thomas.

== Title's history ==
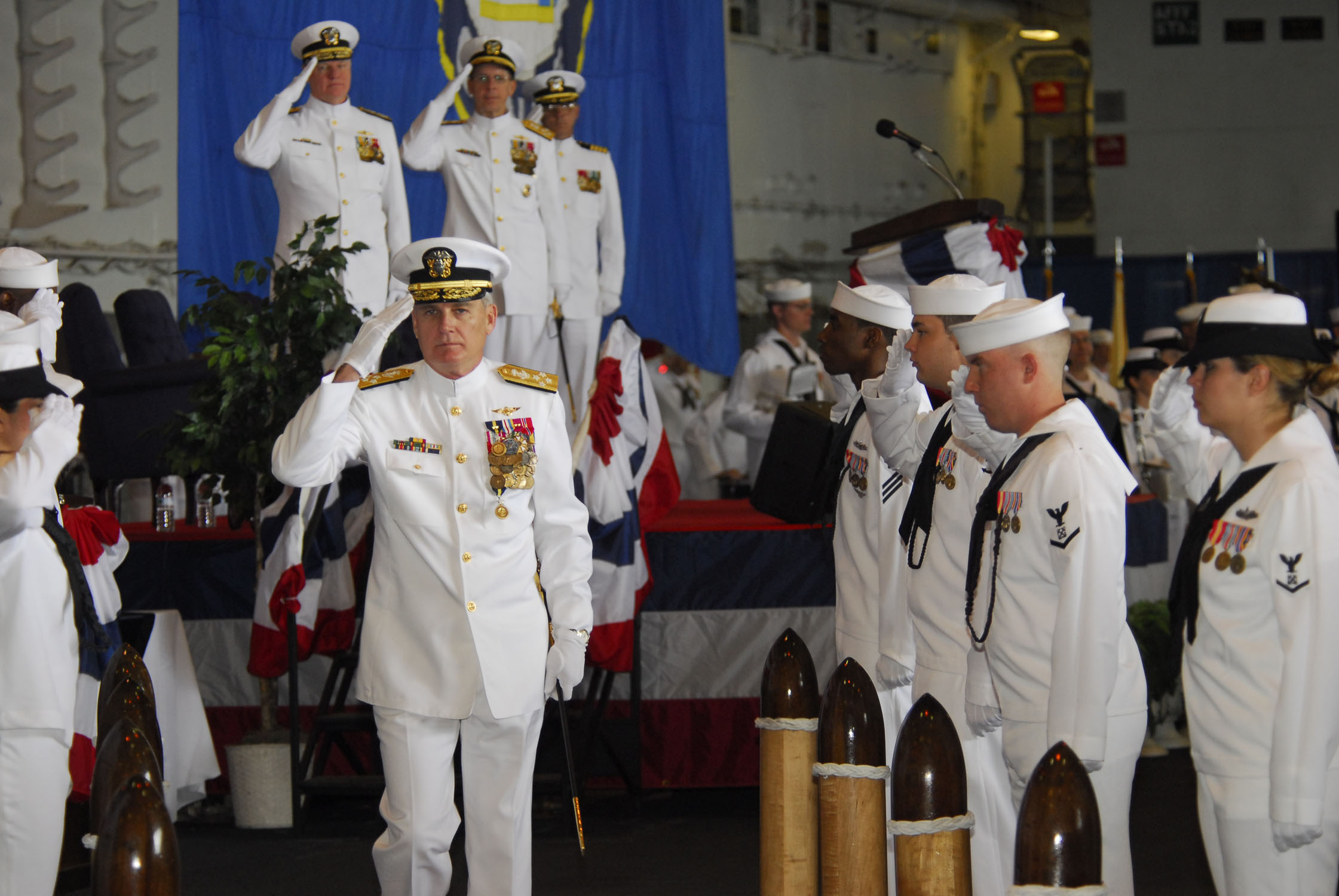
Outgoing commander, U.S. Fleet Forces Command, Admiral John B. Nathman is piped ashore during the 2007 U.S. Fleet Forces Command change of command ceremony on May 17, 2007.

The first commander-in-chief of the Atlantic Fleet was Rear Admiral Robley D. Evans, who assumed command on January 1, 1906 aboard his flagship the battleship USS Maine (BB-10).

The title, Commander-in-Chief, U.S. Atlantic Fleet, was continuously used from 1906 until 1923 and again from 1941 to 2002. In a reorganization of the United States Fleet in 1923, that title was abolished and the title Commander Scouting Force was used. On February 1, 1941, General Order 143 reestablished the title and reorganized the United States Fleet into three separate fleets: the U.S. Atlantic Fleet, the U.S. Pacific Fleet and the U.S. Asiatic Fleet. The order further stated each fleet would be under the command of a four-star admiral. Thus, on February 1, 1941, Rear Admiral Ernest J. King, in his flagship USS Texas (BB-35) at Culebra, Puerto Rico, hauled down his two-star flag and hoisted his four-star flag as Commander-in-Chief, U.S. Atlantic Fleet.

After the end of World War II, the organization of the United States armed forces was reviewed with a view toward reorganization after the turbulent war years. On December 1, 1947, under a reorganization act of the armed forces approved by Congress, the unified combatant command, United States Atlantic Command, was established with headquarters co-located to those of the U.S. Atlantic Fleet. Admiral William H.P. Blandy was given the dual-hatted command of both U.S. Atlantic Fleet and U.S. Atlantic Command thus becoming the commander-in-chief, U.S. Atlantic Fleet and the first commander-in-chief, U.S. Atlantic Command. The two titles remained linked until another reorganization of the armed forces, via the Goldwater-Nichols Act in 1985, separated the U.S. Atlantic Command from the U.S. Atlantic Fleet.

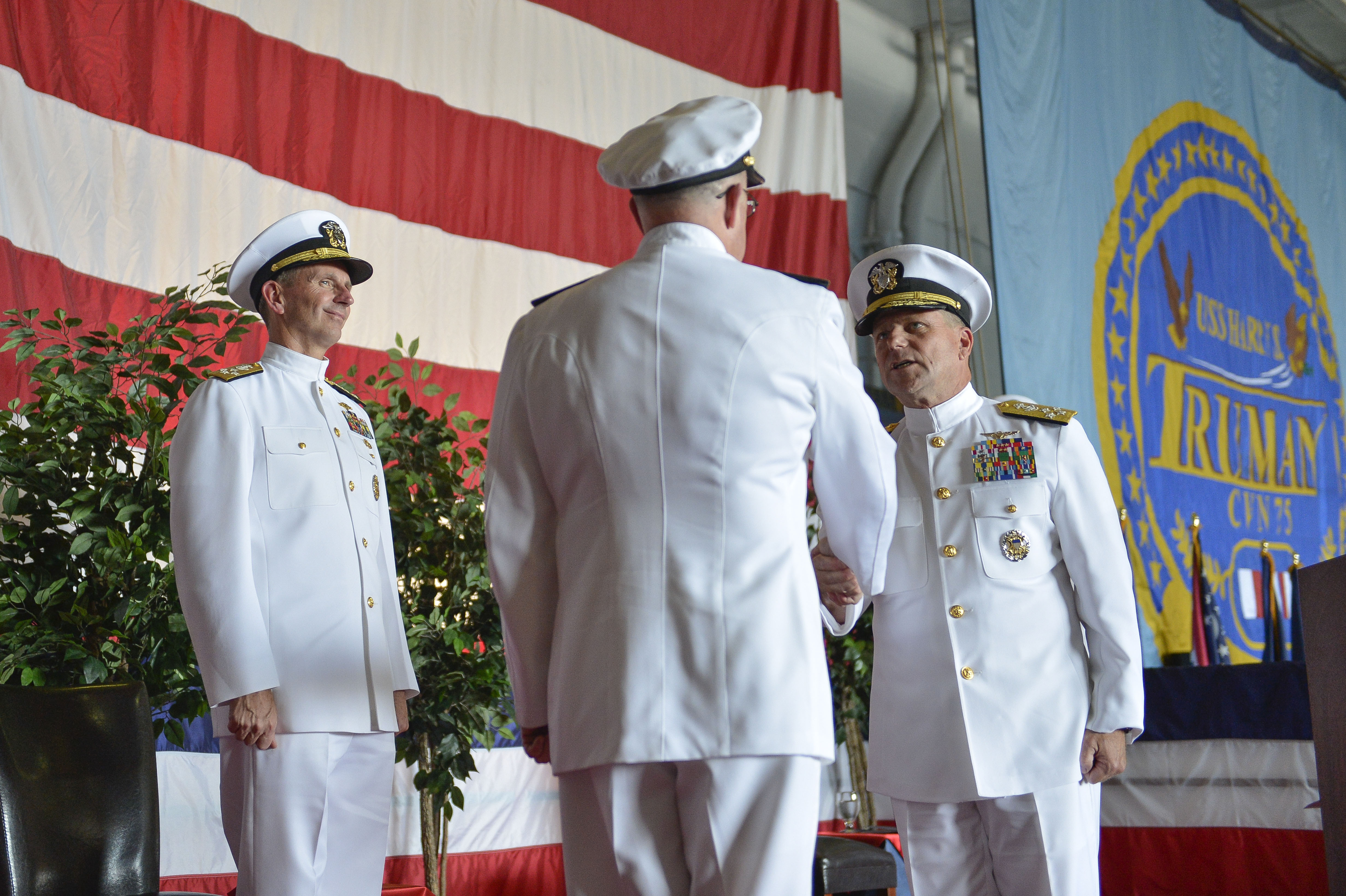
Admiral William E. Gortney (right) relieves Admiral John C. Harvey Jr. (center, face obscured) as commander of U.S. Fleet Forces Command, September 16, 2012.

In the early 1950s, the North Atlantic Treaty Organization (NATO) decided to establish a new major command, Allied Command Atlantic, under the command of a U.S. four-star admiral with headquarters in Norfolk, VA. Since this was primarily a naval command responsible for allied defense of the North Atlantic, the decision was made to co-locate this organization with that of the U.S. Atlantic Command and U.S. Atlantic Fleet, to form a triple-hatted command. On April 10, 1952, Admiral Lynde D. McCormick, the commander-in-chief, U.S. Atlantic Command and U.S. Atlantic Fleet, assumed the additional title as the first Supreme Allied Commander Atlantic. Like the U.S. Atlantic Command, the Allied Command Atlantic remained intact and part of a triple-hatted command organization until the Goldwater-Nichols Act occurred in 1985. The Goldwater-Nichols Act separated command of the U.S. Atlantic Fleet from the other two commands giving the U.S. Atlantic Fleet its own four-star admiral. Admiral Wesley L. McDonald was the last U.S. Navy admiral to command all three organizations at the same time. He relinquished command of the U.S. Atlantic Fleet to Admiral Carlisle A. H. Trost on October 4, 1985.

However, under the Goldwater-Nichols Act, the admiral filling the post of Commander-in-Chief, U.S. Atlantic Fleet, would also serve as the deputy commander-in-chief, U.S. Atlantic Command. This role for CINCLANTFLT continued until 1986 when the secretary of defense approved a separate billet for the deputy commander-in-chief, U.S. Atlantic Command. On September 16, 1986, Admiral Frank B. Kelso II relinquished the Deputy USCINCLANT post to Major General Thomas G. Darling, USAF.

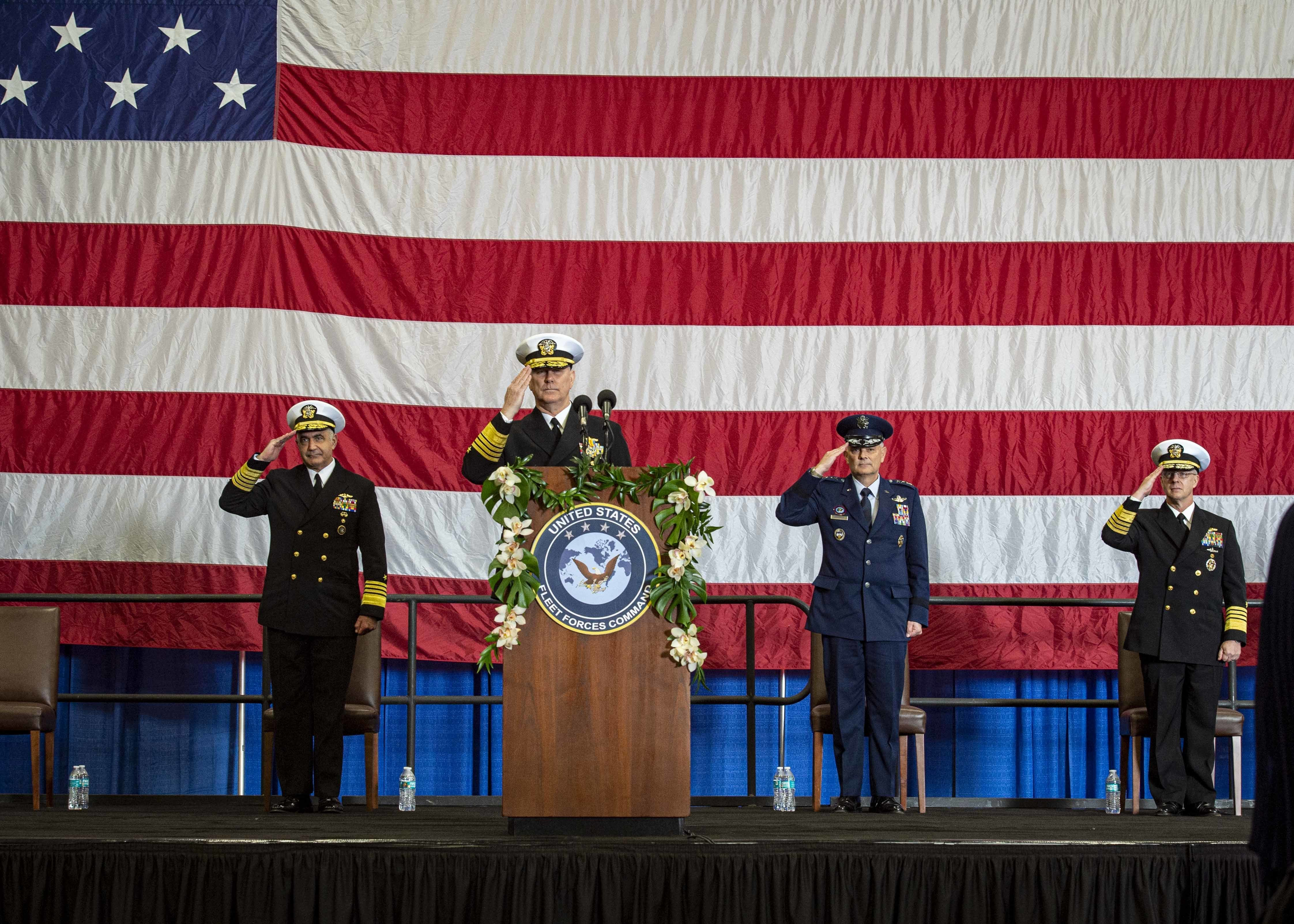
Attendants render a collective salute at the 2021 U.S. Fleet Forces Command change of command ceremony, December 7, 2021.

On October 1, 2001, the chief of naval operations designated the CINCLANTFLT to concurrently serve as Commander, U.S. Fleet Forces Command. U.S. Fleet Forces Command became responsible for overall coordination, establishment, and implementation of integrated requirements and policies for manning, equipping, and training Atlantic and Pacific Fleet units during the inter-deployment training cycle.

On October 24, 2002, Secretary of Defense Donald Rumsfeld directed that the title of "Commander-in-Chief" be reserved solely for the president of the United States. In a message to naval commanders-in-chief, the chief of naval operations directed a change of title to that of "Commander." This change affected the U.S. Atlantic Fleet, U.S. Pacific Fleet, and U.S. Naval Forces Europe thus renaming Commander-in-Chief, U.S. Atlantic Fleet to Commander, U.S. Atlantic Fleet.

On May 23, 2006, the chief of naval operations ordered the assimilation of U.S. Atlantic Fleet into U.S. Fleet Forces Command and that the dual-hatted position be integrated to its current title of Commander, U.S. Fleet Forces Command.

On October 31, 2006, a ceremony was held to officially mark the transition of the U.S. Atlantic Fleet and U.S. Fleet Forces Command to just U.S. Fleet Forces Command. Three of the 37 previous admirals who held the top post in the Atlantic fleet attended the ceremony, which was held aboard the aircraft carrier USS Theodore Roosevelt (CVN-71).

== Appointment ==
The commander, U.S. Fleet Forces Command is nominated by the president for appointment from any eligible officers holding the rank of rear admiral (lower half) or above, who also meets the requirements for the position, under the advice and/or recommendation of the secretary of the Navy, the chief of naval operations, and if applicable the chairman of the Joint Chiefs of Staff. The nominee must be confirmed via majority vote by the Senate. For the Navy, flag officer tours are usually limited to two years.

== List of commanders ==
No.	Commander		Term		
No.	Portrait	Name	Took office	Left office	Term length
Commander-in-Chief, Atlantic Fleet
1	Robley D. Evans	Rear Admiral; Robley D. Evans (1846–1912)	January 1, 1906	May 9, 1908	2 years, 129 days
2	Charles S. Sperry	Rear Admiral; Charles S. Sperry (1847–1911)	May 9, 1908	March 1909	~296 days
3	Seaton Schroeder	Rear Admiral; Seaton Schroeder (1849–1922)	March 1909	June 1911	~2 years, 92 days
4	Hugo W. Osterhaus	Rear Admiral; Hugo W. Osterhaus (1851–1927)	June 1911	January 1913	~1 year, 214 days
5	Charles J. Badger	Rear Admiral; Charles J. Badger (1853–1932)	January 1913	September 1914	~1 year, 243 days
6	Frank F. Fletcher	Admiral; Frank F. Fletcher (1855–1928)	September 1914	June 1916	~1 year, 274 days
7	Henry T. Mayo	Admiral; Henry T. Mayo (1856–1937)	June 1916	June 1919	~3 years, 0 days
8	Henry B. Wilson Jr.	Admiral; Henry B. Wilson Jr. (1861–1954)	June 1919	June 1921	~2 years, 0 days
9	Hilary P. Jones Jr.	Admiral; Hilary P. Jones Jr. (1863–1938)	June 1919	December 1922	~1 year, 183 days
Position redesignated as Commander, Scouting Fleet from 1922 to 1931; Commander, Scouting Force from 1931 to 1941
Commander-in-Chief, U.S. Atlantic Fleet
10	Ernest J. King	Admiral; Ernest J. King (1878–1956)	February 1, 1941	December 30, 1941	332 days
11	Royal E. Ingersoll	Admiral; Royal E. Ingersoll (1883–1976)	December 30, 1941	November 15, 1944	2 years, 321 days
12	Jonas H. Ingram	Admiral; Jonas H. Ingram (1886–1952)	November 15, 1944	September 26, 1946	1 year, 315 days
13	Marc A. Mitscher	Admiral; Marc A. Mitscher (1887–1947)	September 26, 1946	February 3, 1947	130 days
Commander-in-Chief, U.S. Atlantic Fleet / Commander-in-Chief, U.S. Atlantic Command
14	William H. P. Blandy	Admiral; William H. P. Blandy (1890–1954)	February 3, 1947	February 1, 1950	2 years, 363 days
15	William M. Fechteler	Admiral; William M. Fechteler (1896–1967)	February 1, 1950	August 15, 1951	1 year, 195 days
Commander-in-Chief, U.S. Atlantic Fleet / Commander-in-Chief, U.S. Atlantic Command / Supreme Allied Commander Atlantic
16	Lynde D. McCormick	Admiral; Lynde D. McCormick (1895–1956)	August 15, 1951	April 12, 1954	2 years, 240 days
17	Jerauld Wright	Admiral; Jerauld Wright (1898–1995)	April 12, 1954	February 28, 1960	5 years, 322 days
18	Robert L. Dennison	Admiral; Robert L. Dennison (1901–1980)	February 28, 1960	April 30, 1963	3 years, 61 days
19	Harold P. Smith	Admiral; Harold P. Smith (1904–1993)	April 30, 1963	April 30, 1965	2 years, 0 days
20	Thomas H. Moorer	Admiral; Thomas H. Moorer (1912–2004)	April 30, 1965	June 17, 1967	2 years, 48 days
21	Ephraim P. Holmes	Admiral; Ephraim P. Holmes (1908–1997)	June 17, 1967	September 30, 1970	3 years, 105 days
22	Charles K. Duncan	Admiral; Charles K. Duncan (1911–1994)	September 30, 1970	October 31, 1972	2 years, 31 days
23	Ralph W. Cousins	Admiral; Ralph W. Cousins (1915–2009)	October 31, 1972	May 30, 1975	2 years, 211 days
24	Isaac C. Kidd Jr.	Admiral; Isaac C. Kidd Jr. (1919–1999)	May 30, 1975	September 30, 1978	3 years, 123 days
25	Harry D. Train II	Admiral; Harry D. Train II (born 1927)	September 30, 1978	September 30, 1982	4 years, 0 days
26	Wesley L. McDonald	Admiral; Wesley L. McDonald (1924–2009)	September 30, 1982	October 4, 1985	3 years, 4 days
Commander-in-Chief, U.S. Atlantic Fleet / Deputy Commander-in-Chief, U.S. Atlantic Command
27	Carlisle A. H. Trost	Admiral; Carlisle A. H. Trost (born 1930)	October 4, 1985	June 30, 1986	269 days
28	Frank B. Kelso II	Admiral; Frank B. Kelso II (1933–2013)	June 30, 1986	September 16, 1986	78 days
Commander-in-Chief, U.S. Atlantic Fleet
28	Frank B. Kelso II	Admiral; Frank B. Kelso II (1933–2013)	September 16, 1986	November 4, 1988	2 years, 49 days
29	Powell F. Carter Jr.	Admiral; Powell F. Carter Jr. (1931–2017)	November 4, 1988	January 31, 1991	2 years, 88 days
30	Paul David Miller	Admiral; Paul David Miller (born 1941)	January 31, 1991	July 13, 1992	1 year, 164 days
31	Henry H. Mauz Jr.	Admiral; Henry H. Mauz Jr. (born 1936)	July 13, 1992	October 5, 1994	2 years, 84 days
32	William J. Flanagan Jr.	Admiral; William J. Flanagan Jr. (born 1943)	October 5, 1994	December 20, 1996	2 years, 76 days
33	J. Paul Reason	Admiral; J. Paul Reason (born 1941)	December 20, 1996	September 17, 1999	2 years, 271 days
34	Vern Clark	Admiral; Vern Clark (born 1944)	September 17, 1999	June 23, 2000	280 days
35	Robert J. Natter	Admiral; Robert J. Natter (born 1945)	June 23, 2000	October 1, 2002	2 years, 100 days
Commander-in-Chief, U.S. Atlantic Fleet / Commander, U.S. Fleet Forces Command
35	Robert J. Natter	Admiral; Robert J. Natter (born 1945)	October 1, 2002	October 24, 2002	23 days
Commander, U.S. Atlantic Fleet / Commander, U.S. Fleet Forces Command
35	Robert J. Natter	Admiral; Robert J. Natter (born 1945)	October 24, 2002	October 3, 2003	344 days
36	William J. Fallon	Admiral; William J. Fallon (born 1944)	October 3, 2003	February 18, 2005	1 year, 138 days
37	John B. Nathman	Admiral; John B. Nathman (born 1948)	February 18, 2005	May 22, 2006	1 year, 93 days
Commander, U.S. Fleet Forces Command
38	John B. Nathman	Admiral; John B. Nathman (born 1948)	May 22, 2006	May 16, 2007	359 days
39	Gary Roughead	Admiral; Gary Roughead (born 1951)	May 17, 2007	September 29, 2007	134 days
40	Jonathan W. Greenert	Admiral; Jonathan W. Greenert (born 1953)	September 29, 2007	July 23, 2009	1 year, 297 days
41	John C. Harvey Jr.	Admiral; John C. Harvey Jr. (born 1951)	July 24, 2009	September 14, 2012	3 years, 52 days
42	William E. Gortney	Admiral; William E. Gortney (born 1955)	September 14, 2012	November 21, 2014	2 years, 68 days
–	Nora W. Tyson	Vice Admiral; Nora W. Tyson (born 1957); Acting	November 21, 2014	December 19, 2014	28 days
Commander, U.S. Fleet Forces Command / Commander, U.S. Naval Forces Northern Command
43	Philip S. Davidson	Admiral; Philip S. Davidson (born 1960)	December 19, 2014	May 4, 2018	3 years, 136 days
44	Christopher W. Grady	Admiral; Christopher W. Grady (born 1962)	May 4, 2018	February 1, 2019	273 days
Commander, U.S. Fleet Forces Command / Commander, U.S. Naval Forces Northern Command and U.S. Naval Forces Strategic Command / Joint Functional Maritime Component Commander
44	Christopher W. Grady	Admiral; Christopher W. Grady (born 1962)	February 1, 2019	December 7, 2021	2 years, 309 days
45	Daryl L. Caudle	Admiral; Daryl L. Caudle (born 1963)	December 7, 2021	August 6, 2025	3 years, 242 days
–	John E. Gumbleton	Vice Admiral; John E. Gumbleton (born 1967); Acting	August 6, 2025	December 1, 2025	117 days
Commander, U.S. Fleet Forces Command
46	Karl O. Thomas	Admiral; Karl O. Thomas (born 1963)	December 1, 2025	Incumbent	320 days

== See also ==
- Commander, U.S. Pacific Fleet
