= Robert J. Kelly =

U.S. Navy four star admiral

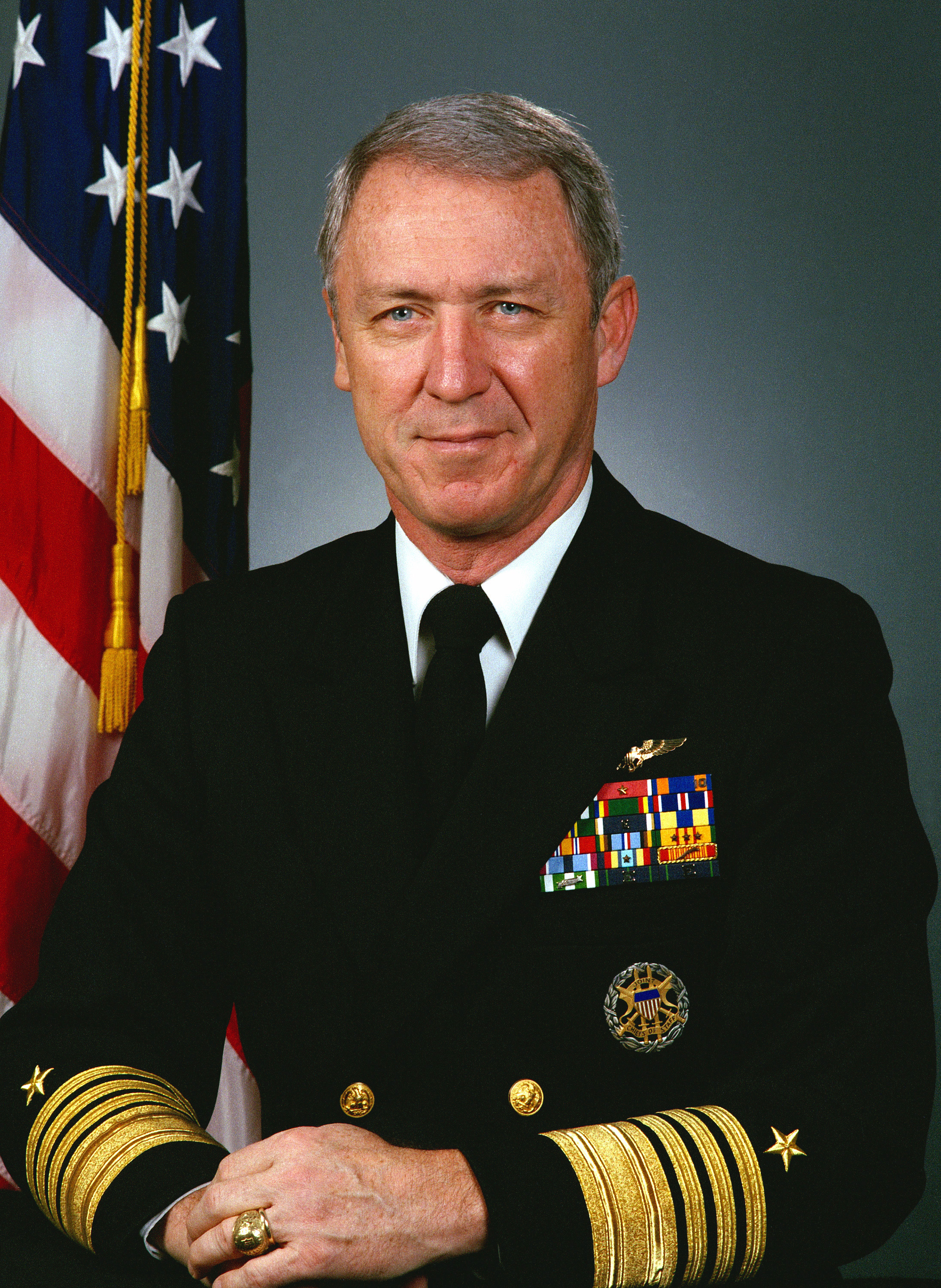
- Admiral Robert J. Kelly
- Born: March 4, 1938 (age 88); Reading, Pennsylvania, U.S.
- Military career
- Branch: United States Navy
- Service years: 1959–1994
- Rank: Admiral
- Nickname: Barney
- Commands: US Pacific Fleet; USS Enterprise (CVN-65)
- Conflicts: Vietnam War
- Awards: Legion of Merit; Air Medal; Bronze Star

Robert Joseph Kelly (born March 4, 1938) is a retired United States Navy four star admiral who served as Commander in Chief, United States Pacific Fleet (CINCPACFLT) from 1991 to 1994.

== Biography ==
Born in Reading, Pennsylvania, Kelly graduated from the U. S. Naval Academy in 1959 and was designated a Naval Aviator in 1961. Kelly's flying career included air combat in Vietnam War. Staff tours included the Naval Postgraduate School and in the Pentagon. He was a graduate of the Navy Nuclear Training Program, and went on to command USS Enterprise (CVN-65).

On 28 April 1983, he was guiding USS ENTERPRISE home from an eight month WESTPAC deployment when the ship ran aground near its home port of Alameda. In a news conference, then Captain Kelly said bluntly: 'I am the captain and I was in control. I am totally responsible for what happened.”

He served as Vice Director of Operations for the Joint Chiefs of Staff, Director of the Institute for Strategic Studies at the National War College, and Deputy Chief of Naval Operations for Plans, Policy, and Operations. His final naval assignment was as Commander in Chief, United States Pacific Fleet (CINCPACFLT) from 1991 to 1994. During his time at CINCPACTFLT he punished a number of subordinates for clear violations of the Navy's policy against sexist behavior.

=== Scandal and Forced Retirement ===
Kelly was the senior Naval Aviator present during the 1991 Tailhook scandal. Subsequently on October 16, 1992, Kelly reportedly made a sexually explicit joke during a staff meeting at his Pearl Harbor headquarters. He was rebuked for the joke by Vice Chief of Naval Operations Stan Arthur and later recommended for forced retirement by Secretary of the Navy John Howard Dalton. After retirement, he was the Executive Vice President of The Wing Group, a leading international developer of energy projects. In March 1999, Kelly became the President and Chief Operating Officer of Energetics, Inc., an energy consulting company and wholly owned subsidiary of the VSE Corporation. Kelly has been the president of Pensacola Country Club.
