= Powell F. Carter Jr. =

American naval admiral

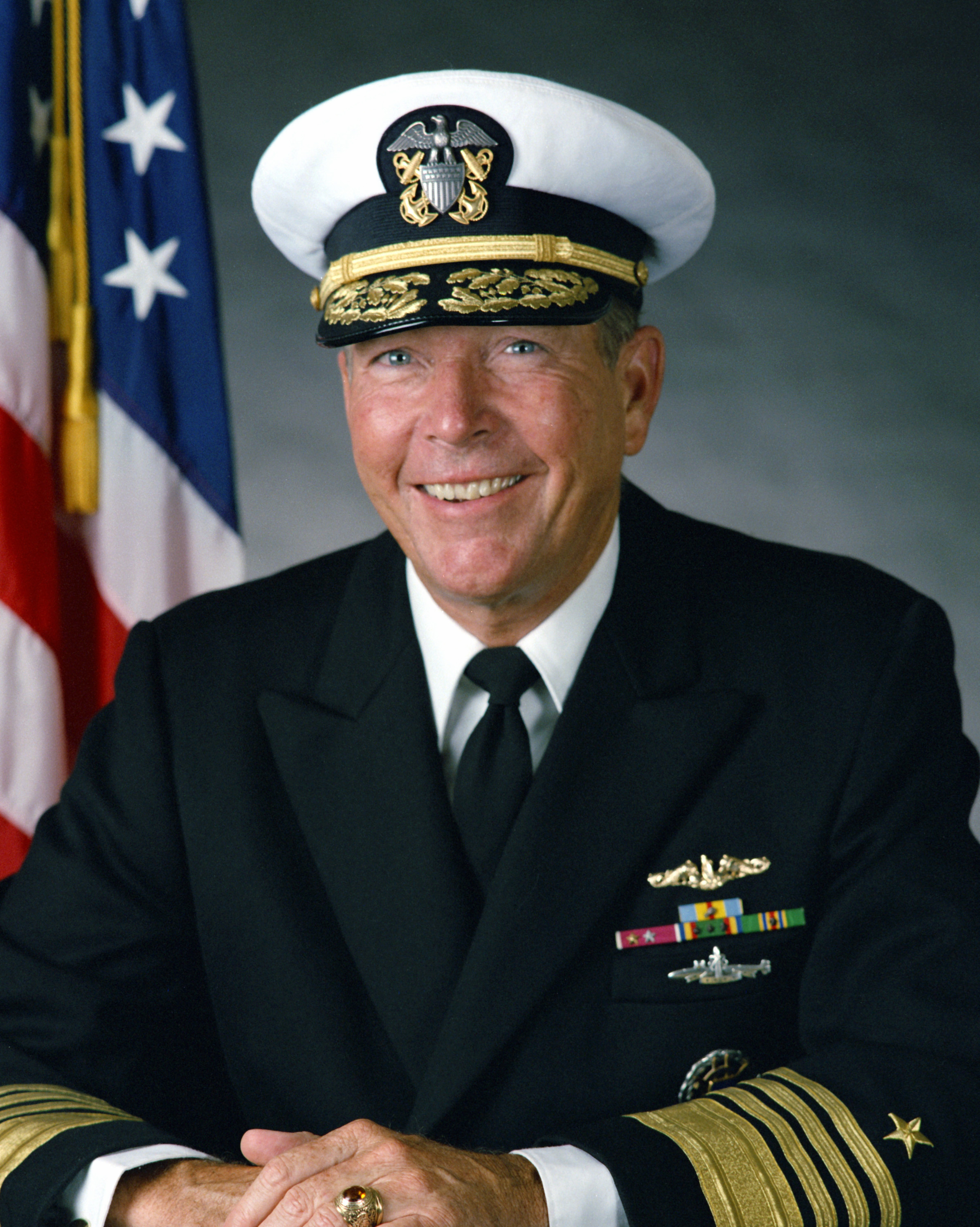
- Admiral Powell F. Carter Jr. in 1988
- Born: June 3, 1931; Los Angeles, California, U.S.
- Died: June 28, 2017 (aged 86); Harpers Ferry, West Virginia, U.S.
- Military career
- Allegiance: United States of America
- Branch: United States Navy
- Service years: 1955–1991
- Rank: Admiral
- Commands: US Atlantic Fleet
- Conflicts: Korean War
- Awards: Defense Distinguished Service Medal; Legion of Merit (7)

Powell Frederick Carter Jr. (June 3, 1931 – June 28, 2017) was a United States Navy four star admiral who served as Director of the Joint Staff 1985–1987, United States Military Representative, NATO Military Committee (USMILREP) from 1987 to 1988; and as Commander in Chief, United States Atlantic Fleet (CINCLANTFLT) from 1988 to 1991. He died at the age of 86 in 2017.
