= Ralph W. Cousins =

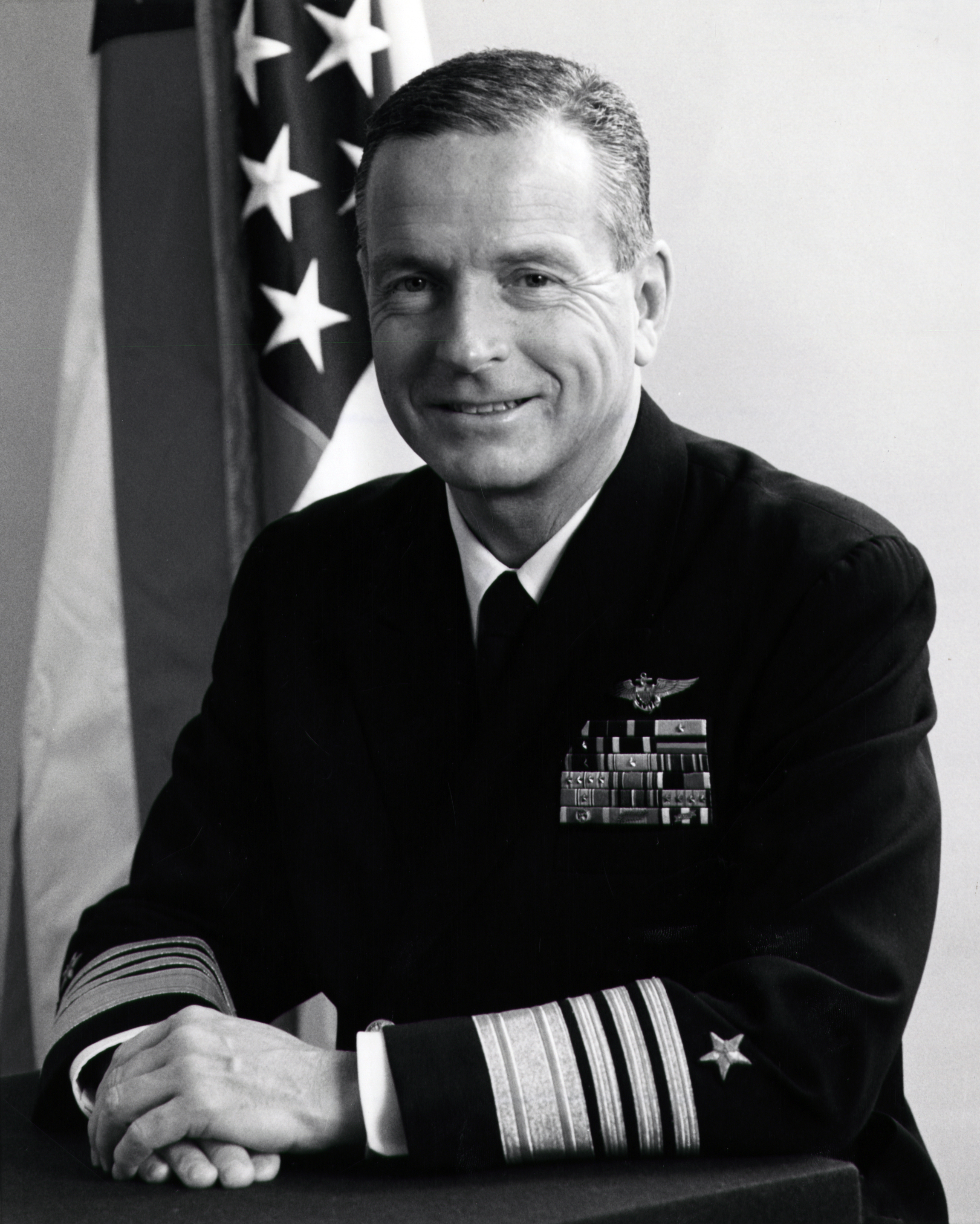
- US Navy photograph of Ralph Cousins
- Born: July 24, 1915; Eldorado, Oklahoma, US
- Died: August 5, 2009 (aged 94); Newport News, Virginia, US
- Military career
- Branch: United States Navy
- Service years: 1937–1975
- Rank: Admiral
- Commands: Supreme Allied Commander Atlantic; United States Atlantic Fleet; Vice Chief of Naval Operations; Task Force 77; USS Midway (CV-41); USS Nantahala (AO-60)
- Conflicts: World War II; Vietnam War
- Awards: Navy Cross; Navy Distinguished Service Medal (4); Legion of Merit (2); Air Medal (2)
- Other work: President of Newport News Shipbuilding and Dry Dock

Ralph W. Cousins (July 24, 1915 – August 5, 2009) was a four-star admiral and aviator of the United States Navy. As an aircraft carrier pilot, Cousins led dive-bomber attacks against the Imperial Japanese Navy at the Battle of the Coral Sea in May 1942, for which he was awarded the Navy Cross. During the Vietnam War from 1967 to 1969, Cousins commanded the attack carrier strike force of five carriers stationed off the coast of Vietnam. In 1970, Cousins was promoted to four star admiral and appointed Vice Chief of Naval Operations. From 1972 to 1975, he commanded the United States Atlantic Fleet and served as Supreme Allied Commander Atlantic.

Cousins retired from the navy in 1975 and served as president and executive of Newport News Shipbuilding and Dry Dock until 1979. He was promoted to President of Tenneco Europe based in London where he served with distinction from 1979 until his retirement in 1985. He died on August 5, 2009, from complications from a fall in Newport News, Virginia, where he had lived since his retirement. His wife of 60 years, Mary McBride, had died in 2007. He left no immediate survivors.
