= Harold Page Smith =

United States Naval commander (1904–1993)

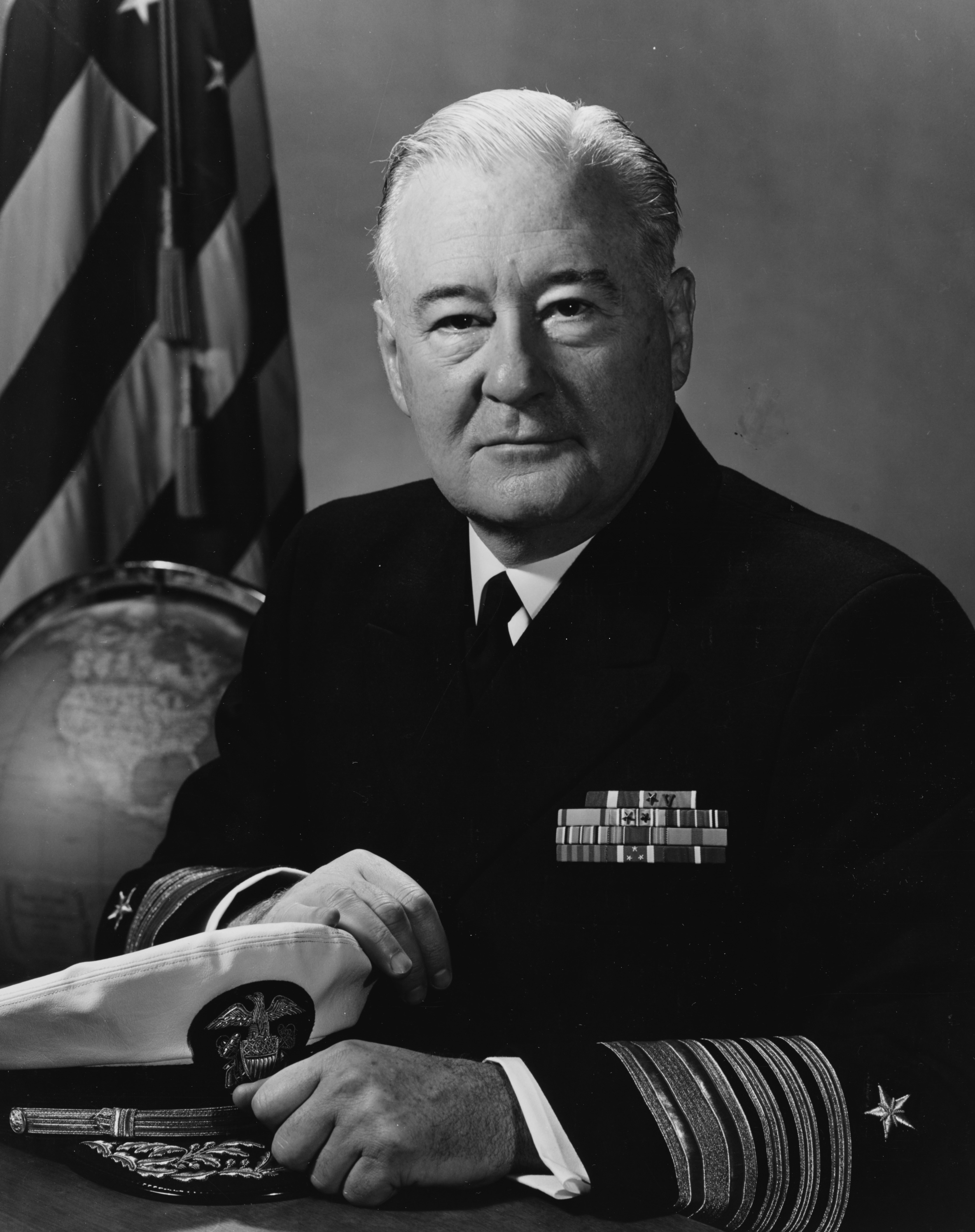
- Harold Page Smith
- Born: February 17, 1904; Grand Bay, Alabama, U.S.
- Died: January 4, 1993 (aged 88); Virginia Beach, Virginia, U.S.
- Military career
- Allegiance: United States
- Branch: United States Navy
- Service years: 1924–1965
- Rank: Admiral
- Commands: Allied Command Atlantic; United States Atlantic Fleet; United States Naval Forces Europe
- Conflicts: World War II
- Awards: Navy Cross; Navy Distinguished Service Medal; Legion of Merit (2)

Admiral Harold Page Smith (February 17, 1904 – January 4, 1993) was a United States Navy four-star admiral who served as Commander in Chief, United States Naval Forces Europe/Commander in Chief, United States Naval Forces, Eastern Atlantic and Mediterranean from 1960 to 1963 and Supreme Allied Commander Atlantic/Commander in Chief, Allied Command Atlantic/Commander in Chief, United States Atlantic Fleet from 1963 to 1965.

== Military career ==
Smith attended the United States Naval Academy and graduated in its class of 1924. He served aboard USS Idaho (BB-42), USS Arizona (BB-39), USS Nevada (BB-36), USS Procyon (AG-11), USS Farragut (DD-348), USS Marblehead (CL-12), USS Stewart (DD-224), and USS Missouri (BB-63).
