= Paul David Miller =

United States admiral

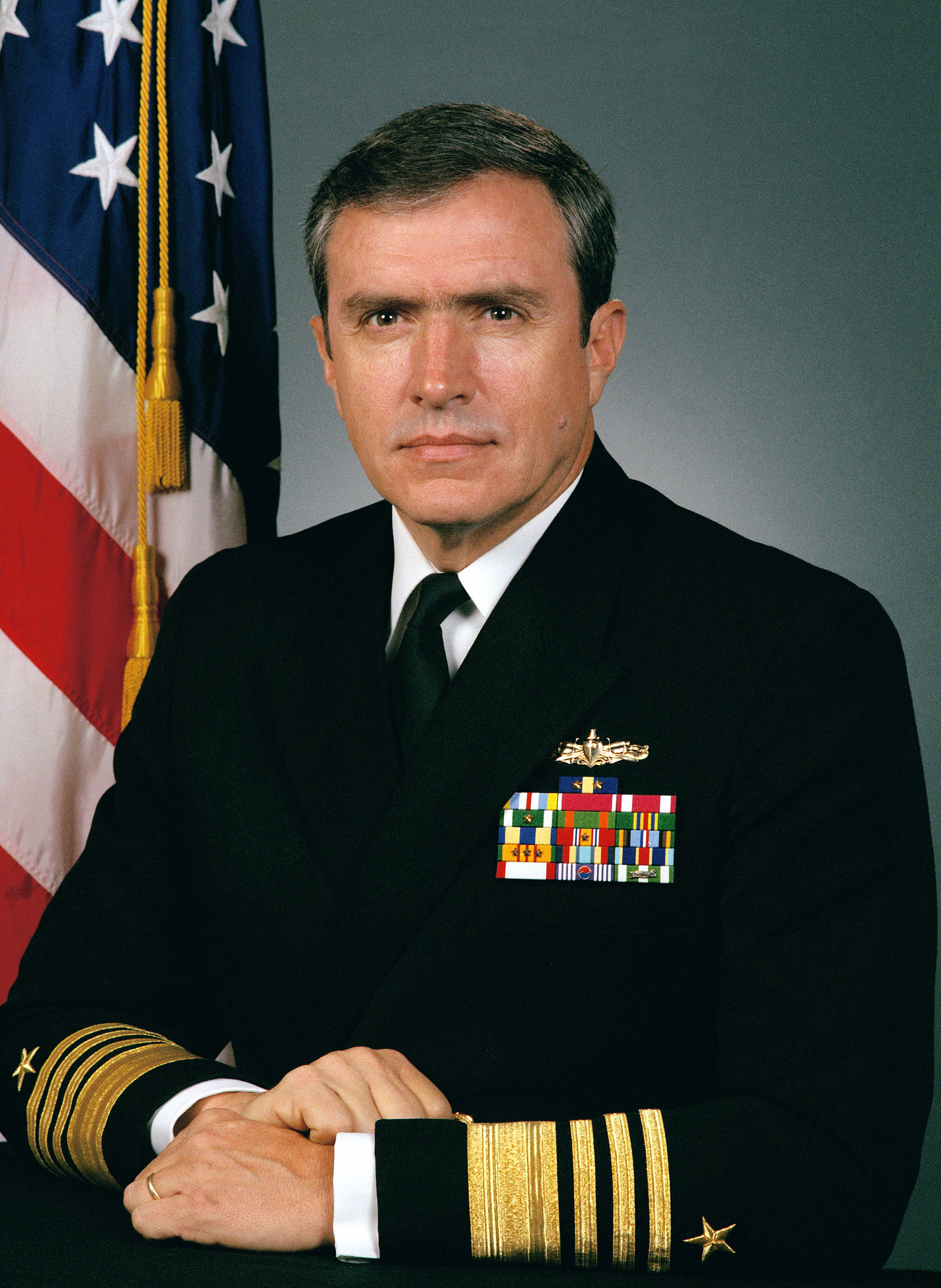
- Born: December 1, 1941 (age 84); Roanoke, Virginia, U.S.
- Spouse: Becky
- Military career
- Allegiance: United States of America
- Branch: United States Navy
- Service years: 1964-1994
- Rank: Admiral
- Commands: Commander-in-Chief, U.S. Atlantic Command; Deputy Chief of Naval Operations

Paul David Miller (born December 1, 1941) is a retired admiral in the United States Navy. His last duty in the Navy was to serve as Commander-in-Chief, of the U.S. Atlantic Command.

Prior to the last position, he served as the NATO Supreme Allied Commander-Atlantic. In addition he also served Commander for the U.S. Atlantic Fleet, Commander for the U.S. Seventh Fleet, and Deputy Chief of Naval Operations.

== Education ==
- Bachelor's degree from Florida State University.
- Master's degree in Business Administration from the University of Georgia in 1964.
- Attended Naval War College.
- Attended the Harvard Business School Executive Management Program.

== Awards and decorations ==

Badge	Surface Warfare Officer Pin		
1st Row	Navy Distinguished Service Medal with two gold award stars		
2nd Row	Defense Superior Service Medal	Legion of Merit with three gold stars	Meritorious Service Medal
3rd row	Navy and Marine Corps Commendation Medal with award star	Navy and Marine Corps Achievement Medal	Navy Meritorious Unit Commendation
4th Row	Navy Expeditionary Medal	National Defense Service Medal with one bronze service star	Armed Forces Expeditionary Medal
5th row	Vietnam Service Medal with three service stars	Navy Sea Service Deployment Ribbon	Navy and Marine Corps Overseas Service Ribbon
6th row	China Order of the Cloud and Banner with Grand Cordon	Korean Order of National Security Merit, Gukseon Medal	Vietnam Campaign Medal
