= Chief of Naval Personnel =

Flag appointment of the U.S. Navy

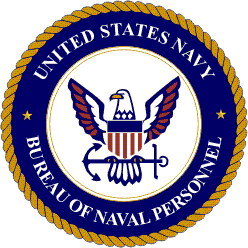
- Seal of BUPERS

- Flag of a Navy vice admiral

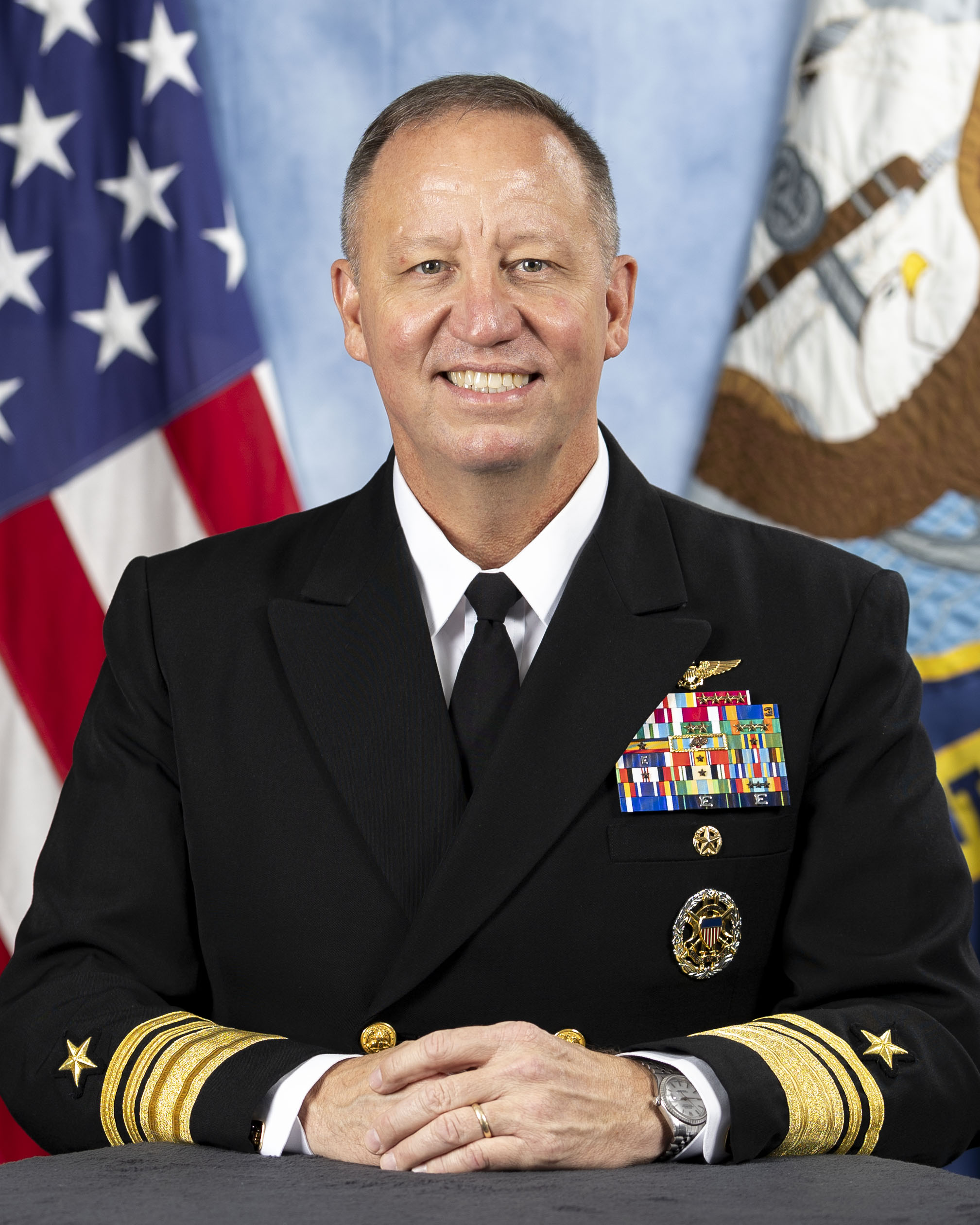
- Incumbent; Vice Admiral Jeffrey J. Czerewko since August 1, 2025
- Bureau of Naval Personnel; Office of the Chief of Naval Operations
- Type: U.S. Navy Flag Officer
- Abbreviation: CNP
- Reports to: Secretary of the Navy; Chief of Naval Operations
- Seat: Naval Support Facility Arlington, Arlington, Virginia
- Appointer: The President; with Senate advice and consent
- Term length: 4 years
- Constituting instrument: 10 U.S.C. § 8081
- Deputy: Deputy Chief of Naval Personnel
- Website: Official Website

The Chief of Naval Personnel (CNP) is responsible for military personnel, manpower, training, and education policy planning and oversight for the United States Navy. CNP serves "dual hatted" as Deputy Chief of Naval Operations (DCNO) for Total Force (N1) within the Office of the Chief of Naval Operations (OPNAV). DCNO N1 is one of five deputy chiefs of naval operations. As of October 2026, The CNP leads the Bureau of Naval Personnel (BUPERS) and indirectly oversees the Bureau of Medicine and Surgery, Navy Reserve Force, and Naval Education and Training Command. While most BUPERS personnel are located in Millington, Tennessee, and are overseen on a day-to-day basis by the Deputy Chief of Naval Personnel (DCNP)—dual-hatted as Commander, Navy Personnel Command (CNPC)—the BUPERS headquarters and OPNAV N1 staff directly supporting DCNO N1/CNP are located in Arlington County, Virginia. CNP and the other four DCNOs are nominated by the president of the United States and must be confirmed via majority vote by the United States Senate. Each DCNO is appointed as a three-star vice admiral while holding office.

While providing strategic direction for the entire MyNavy HR enterprise, DCNO N1/CNP is responsible for overseeing all aspects of Navy personnel management for both officers and enlisted personnel and ensures the Navy has a ready, well-trained, and properly distributed workforce to meet operational demands. CNP also advises senior Navy leadership on human resource strategies, promulgates personnel policies in alignment with federal law and Department of War guidance, and directs the execution of programs that impact the well-being, advancement, and professional development of Sailors throughout their careers.

== List of chiefs ==
Until 1942, the Bureau of Navigation managed officer assignments, personnel records, and training for the U.S. Navy. In 1942, it was reorganized and renamed the Bureau of Naval Personnel. Below is the list of chiefs of the Bureau of Navigation and the Bureau of Naval Personnel:

#	Picture	Name	Rank	Start	End	Notability	Ref
1		Charles H. Davis	Rear admiral	July 17, 1862	April 27, 1865	Veteran of Filibuster War and American Civil War; Member of Davis political family.	
2		Percival Drayton	Captain	April 28, 1865	August 4, 1865	Veteran of Paraguay expedition and American Civil War for Union; Brother of Confederate General Thomas Drayton. Percival Drayton died in office.	
3		David Dixon Porter (acting)	Rear admiral	August 8, 1865	August 24, 1865	Veteran of Mexican–American War and American Civil War; Later served as Superintendent of the United States Naval Academy.	
4		Thornton A. Jenkins	Rear admiral	August 24, 1865	April 11, 1869	Veteran of Mexican–American War and American Civil War; Later commanded the Asiatic Squadron.	
5		James Alden Jr.	Rear admiral	April 12, 1869	September 30, 1871	Veteran of Mexican–American War and American Civil War; Later commanded the European Squadron.	
6		Daniel Ammen	Rear admiral	October 1, 1871	June 4, 1878	Veteran of American Civil War; Also commanded the Bureau of Yards and Docks.	
7		William D. Whiting	Commodore	June 11, 1878	October 12, 1881	Veteran of American Civil War;	
8		John G. Walker	Rear admiral	October 22, 1881	October 31, 1889	Veteran of American Civil War; Also commanded the White Squadron.	
9		Francis M. Ramsay	Rear admiral	November 1, 1889	April 5, 1897	Veteran of American Civil War; Also commanded the New York Navy Yard and served as naval attaché in London.	
10		Arent S. Crowninshield	Rear admiral	April 8, 1897	April 28, 1902	Veteran of American Civil War and Spanish–American War; Member of Crowninshield family.	
11		Henry C. Taylor	Rear admiral	April 29, 1902	July 26, 1904	Veteran of American Civil War and Spanish–American War; Previously served as the President of the Naval War College. Taylor died in office.	
12		George A. Converse	Rear admiral	August 1, 1904	May 18, 1907	Veteran of Spanish–American War; Also commanded the Bureau of Ordnance.	
13		Willard H. Brownson	Rear admiral	May 19, 1907	December 24, 1908	Veteran of Revolta da Armada and Spanish–American War; Also served as the Superintendent of the United States Naval Academy.	
14		John E. Pillsbury	Rear admiral	January 14, 1908	June 23, 1909	Veteran of Spanish–American War; Later served as the President of National Geographic Society.	
15		William P. Potter	Rear admiral	July 1, 1909	December 2, 1909	Veteran of Spanish–American War; Later served as aid for Personnel to the Secretary of the Navy George von Lengerke Meyer.	
16		Reginald F. Nicholson	Rear admiral	December 2, 1909	January 1, 1912	Veteran of American Civil War, Spanish–American War and World War I; Later served as the first American naval attaché to Ecuador and Peru. Brother of Army general William J. Nicholson.	
17		Philip Andrews	Rear admiral	January 1, 1912	March 26, 1913	Veteran of Philippine–American War and World War I; Later commanded the US Naval Forces in Europe. Recipient of the Navy Distinguished Service Medal.	
18		Victor Blue	Rear admiral	March 26, 1913	August 10, 1916	Veteran of Spanish–American War, Philippine–American War and World War I; Served two times as Chief of the Bureau of Navigation. Recipient of the Navy Distinguished Service Medal and Specially Meritorious Service Medal.	
19		Leigh C. Palmer	Rear admiral	August 16, 1916	November 1, 1918	Veteran of Spanish–American War and World War I; Recipient of the Navy Distinguished Service Medal.	
20		Victor Blue	Rear admiral	December 19, 1918	July 21, 1919	Veteran of Spanish–American War, Philippine–American War and World War I; Served two times as Chief of the Bureau of Navigation. Recipient of the Navy Distinguished Service Medal and Specially Meritorious Service Medal.	
21		Thomas Washington	Rear admiral	August 11, 1919	July 27, 1923	Veteran of Spanish–American War, Philippine–American War and World War I; Later served as Commandant of the Naval Operating Base, San Francisco, California and reached the rank of four-star admiral. Recipient of the Navy Distinguished Service Medal.	
22		Andrew T. Long	Rear admiral	July 27, 1923	June 7, 1924	Veteran of Spanish–American War, Philippine–American War and World War I; Recipient of the Navy Distinguished Service Medal and Legion of Honour.	
23		William R. Shoemaker	Rear admiral	June 7, 1924	February 10, 1927	Veteran of Spanish–American War, and World War I; Recipient of the Navy Cross.	
24		Richard H. Leigh	Rear admiral	February 10, 1927	May 22, 1930	Veteran of Spanish–American War, and World War I; Later served as four-star admiral as Commander-in-Chief, United States Fleet. Recipient of the Navy Distinguished Service Medal, Order of the British Empire and Order of Leopold.	
25		Frank B. Upham	Rear admiral	May 22, 1930	June 30, 1933	Veteran of Spanish–American War, and World War I; Later served as four-star admiral as Commander-in-Chief, Asiatic Fleet. Recipient of the Navy Cross.	
26		William D. Leahy	Rear admiral	July 1, 1933	June 30, 1935	Veteran of Spanish–American War, Philippine–American War, World War I and World War II; One of four men, who achieved the rank of fleet admiral. Later served as Chief of Naval Operations or first Chairman of the Joint Chiefs of Staff. Recipient of the Navy Cross and three awards of Navy Distinguished Service Medal.	
27		Adolphus Andrews	Rear admiral	June 30, 1935	June 11, 1938	Veteran of Spanish–American War, Veracruz Expedition, World War I and World War II; Reached the rank of vice admiral. Later served as Commander, Eastern Sea Frontier. Recipient of the Navy Distinguished Service Medal.	
28		James O. Richardson	Rear admiral	June 11, 1938	June 15, 1939	Veteran of Spanish–American War, Philippine–American War, World War I and World War II; Reached the rank of admiral. Later served as Commander-in-Chief, United States Pacific Fleet.	
29		Chester W. Nimitz	Rear admiral	June 15, 1939	December 19, 1941	Veteran of World War I and World War II; One of four men, who achieved the rank of fleet admiral. Later served as Chief of Naval Operations or Commander-in-Chief, United States Pacific Fleet. Recipient of four awards of Navy Distinguished Service Medal and one Army Distinguished Service Medal.	
30		Randall Jacobs	Vice admiral	December 19, 1941	September 15, 1945	Veteran of World War I and World War II; Reached the rank of vice admiral while in office. Held the command of the bureau for the duration of World War II. Recipient of Navy Distinguished Service Medal.	
31		Louis E. Denfeld	Vice admiral	September 15, 1945	February 21, 1947	Veteran of Veracruz Expedition, Haitian Campaign, World War I and World War II; Reached the rank of four-star admiral. Later served as Chief of Naval Operations or Commander-in-Chief, United States Pacific Fleet. Recipient of Navy Distinguished Service Medal and three awards of Legion of Merit.	
32		William M. Fechteler	Vice admiral	February 22, 1947	September 1949	Veteran of World War I and World War II; Reached the rank of four-star admiral. Later served as Chief of Naval Operations or Commander-in-Chief, United States Atlantic Fleet. Recipient of two awards of Navy Distinguished Service Medal, one Army Distinguished Service Medal and one award of Legion of Merit.	
33		John W. Roper	Vice admiral	September 7, 1949	March 30, 1951	Veteran of World War I and World War II; Reached the rank of vice admiral. Recipient of Legion of Merit and one Navy Commendation Medal.	
34		Laurance T. DuBose	Vice admiral	March 30, 1951	February 2, 1953	Veteran of Haitian Campaign, World War I, Yangtze Patrol and World War II; Reached the rank of four-star admiral. Later served as Commander-in-Chief, United States First Fleet or Commander, Eastern Sea Frontier. Recipient of three awards of the Navy Cross and three awards of Legion of Merit.	
35		James L. Holloway Jr.	Vice admiral	February 3, 1953	January 31, 1956	Veteran of World War I and World War II; Reached the rank of four-star admiral. Later commanded United States Naval Forces Europe during 1958 Lebanon crisis. Recipient of Navy Distinguished Service Medal and one award of Legion of Merit.	
36		Harold P. Smith	Vice admiral	January 31, 1956	February 12, 1960	Veteran of World War II; Reached the rank of four-star admiral. Later commanded United States Atlantic Command. Recipient of the Navy Cross, Navy Distinguished Service Medal and two awards of Legion of Merit.	
37		William R. Smedberg III	Vice admiral	February 12, 1960	February 11, 1964	Veteran of World War II and Korea; Previously served as the Superintendent of the United States Naval Academy. Recipient of the Navy Distinguished Service Medal, Silver Star and five awards of Legion of Merit.	
38		Benedict J. Semmes Jr.	Vice admiral	April 1, 1964	March 31, 1968	Veteran of World War II and Korea; Later served as the President of the Naval War College or Commander-in-Chief, United States Second Fleet. Recipient of the Navy Cross, Navy Distinguished Service Medal, and one award of Legion of Merit.	
39		Charles K. Duncan	Vice admiral	April 5, 1968	August 21, 1970	Veteran of World War II; Later served as the Commander-in-Chief, United States Atlantic Fleet. Recipient of the Navy Distinguished Service Medal, and one award of Legion of Merit.	
40		Dick H. Guinn	Vice admiral	August 21, 1970	February 1, 1972	Veteran of World War II and Korean War; Later served as the Commander-in-Chief, United States Atlantic Fleet. Recipient of the Navy Cross, Navy Distinguished Service Medal, and one award of Legion of Merit.	
41		David H. Bagley	Vice admiral	February 1, 1972	April 10, 1975	Veteran of World War II, Korea and Vietnam; Son of four-star Admiral David W. Bagley and brother of four-star admiral Worth H. Bagley. Recipient of two awards of Navy Distinguished Service Medal, and four awards of Legion of Merit.	
42		James D. Watkins	Vice admiral	April 10, 1975	July 21, 1978	Veteran of Korea and Vietnam; Reached the rank of four-star admiral. Later served as United States Secretary of Energy or Chair of the President's Commission on the HIV Epidemic. Recipient of two awards of Defense Distinguished Service Medal, three awards of Navy Distinguished Service Medal, and three awards of Legion of Merit.	
43		Robert B. Baldwin	Vice admiral	July 21, 1978	August 1, 1980	Veteran of World War II and Vietnam; Previously served as Commander-in-Chief, United States Seventh Fleet. Recipient of two awards of Navy Distinguished Service Medal, and two awards of Legion of Merit.	
44		Lando W. Zech Jr.	Vice admiral	August 1, 1980	September 28, 1983	Veteran of World War II and Korea; Previously served as Commander Naval Forces Japan. Recipient of two awards of Navy Distinguished Service Medal, and two awards of Legion of Merit.	
45		William P. Lawrence	Vice admiral	September 28, 1983	December 31, 1985	Veteran of Korea and Vietnam; Later served as Commander-in-Chief, United States Pacific Fleet and as Superintendent of the United States Naval Academy. Recipient of four awards of Navy Distinguished Service Medal, and three awards of Silver Star.	
46		Dudley L. Carlson	Vice admiral	January 1, 1986	October 8, 1987	Veteran of Vietnam; Two awards of Legion of Merit.	
47		Leon A. Edney	Vice admiral	October 9, 1987	August 8, 1988	Veteran of Vietnam; Retired as four-star admiral. Served as Vice Chief of Naval Operations or Supreme Allied Commander Atlantic. Two awards of Defense Distinguished Service Medal, two awards of Navy Distinguished Service Medal, and five awards of Distinguished Flying Cross.	
48		Jeremy M. Boorda	Vice admiral	August 9, 1988	November 6, 1991	Veteran of Vietnam and Bosnian War; Reached the rank of four-star admiral. Served as Chief of Naval Operations or United States Naval Forces Europe. Two awards of Defense Distinguished Service Medal, four awards of Navy Distinguished Service Medal, and one award of Army Distinguished Service Medal.	
49		Ronald J. Zlatoper	Vice admiral	November 7, 1991	July 22, 1994	Veteran of Vietnam and Gulf War; Retired as four-star admiral. Later served as Commander-in-Chief, United States Pacific Fleet. One award of Defense Distinguished Service Medal, one award of Navy Distinguished Service Medal, and three awards of Legion of Merit.	
50		Frank Bowman	Vice admiral	July 22, 1994	September 19, 1996	Veteran of Vietnam and Gulf War; Retired as four-star admiral. Also served as Director of Naval Nuclear Propulsion. One award of Defense Distinguished Service Medal, one award of Navy Distinguished Service Medal, and four awards of Legion of Merit.	
51		Daniel T. Oliver	Vice admiral	September 20, 1996	November 18, 1999	Veteran of Gulf War; Later served as President of the Naval Postgraduate School. One award of Defense Superior Service Medal, and four awards of Legion of Merit.	
52		Norbert R. Ryan Jr.	Vice admiral	November 19, 1999	October 7, 2002	Veteran of Gulf War; Twin brother of Vice Admiral John R. Ryan. Two awards of Legion of Merit.	
53		Gerald L. Hoewing	Vice admiral	October 8, 2002	November 22, 2005	Veteran of Gulf War; Previously served as Commander, Carrier Group Seven. Navy Distinguished Service Medal and four awards of Legion of Merit.	
54		John C. Harvey Jr.	Vice admiral	November 22, 2005	April 16, 2008	Veteran of Gulf War; Reached the rank of four-star admiral. Later served as Commander, United States Fleet Forces Command. Recipient of Defense Distinguished Service Medal, two awards of Navy Distinguished Service Medal and five awards of Legion of Merit.	
55		Mark E. Ferguson III	Vice admiral	April 16, 2008	October 5, 2011	Veteran of Gulf War; Reached the rank of four-star admiral. Later served as Commander-in-Chief, United States Naval Forces Europe. Recipient of Defense Distinguished Service Medal, two awards of Navy Distinguished Service Medal and three awards of Legion of Merit.	
56		Scott R. Van Buskirk	Vice admiral	October 11, 2011	August 2, 2013	Veteran of Iraq War; Later served as Commander-in-Chief, United States Seventh Fleet. Recipient of two awards of Navy Distinguished Service Medal, and seven awards of Legion of Merit.	
57		William F. Moran	Vice admiral	August 2, 2013	May 27, 2016	Veteran of Gulf War; Reached the rank of four-star admiral. Later served as Vice Chief of Naval Operations. Recipient of two awards of Navy Distinguished Service Medal, and five awards of Legion of Merit.	
58		Robert P. Burke	Vice admiral	May 27, 2016	May 23, 2019	Veteran of Gulf War; Reached the rank of four-star admiral. Later served as Vice Chief of Naval Operations. Recipient of two awards of Navy Distinguished Service Medal, and five awards of Legion of Merit.	
59		John B. Nowell	Vice admiral	May 24, 2019	June 3, 2022	Veteran of Gulf War; Previously served as Director, Military Personnel Plans and Policy. Recipient of Navy Distinguished Service Medal, six awards of Legion of Merit and Bronze Star Medal.	
60		Richard J. Cheeseman Jr.	Vice admiral	June 3, 2022	June 13, 2025	Previously served as Commander, Carrier Strike Group 10. Recipient of four awards of Legion of Merit and Bronze Star Medal.	
61		Jeffrey J. Czerewko	Vice admiral	August 1, 2025	Incumbent	Previously commanded Carrier Strike Group 4 and Strike Fighter Squadron 146. Recipient of the Legion of Merit (4 awards) and the Bronze Star Medal.	

== See also ==
- Chief of Naval Operations
- Bureau of Navigation (United States Navy)
