= Michael Federle =

American manager and publisher

- Other name: Mike Federle
- Citizenship: United States
- Education: Tulane University, Colby College
- Occupation: Chief executive officer of Forbes Media
- Years active: 1983 - present
- Employer: Forbes Media
- Website: forbes.com/sites/mikefederle

Michael Federle is an American manager and publisher, since 2017 the chief executive officer of Forbes Media. Under his leadership Forbes used the wide licensing strategy and created about 40 local editions in 70 countries, and Forbes brand extensions in education, financial services, etc. Recently he prepares Forbes for the IPO to enter the New York Stock Exchange.

== Education ==
He attended Tulane University until 1979 and graduated from Colby College in 1981.

== Career ==
Main roles have included:

- from 1983: sales and marketing management roles on magazine publishing at Time Inc. and Ziff Davis
- 1999 – Publisher at Fortune magazine
- 2006 – Group publisher at Time Inc. Business and Finance Network
- 2008 – Chief executive officer of B2B networks at Next Jump
- 2009 – Group publisher at Bonnier Corporation
- 2010 – President and chief operating officer at Techonomy Media
- Forbes Media:
  - 2011 – Chief operating officer
  - 2016 – President and chief operating officer
  - 2017 – Chief executive officer

== See also ==
- Forbes lists
