= James G. Foggo III =

United States Navy admiral (born 1959)

James G. Foggo
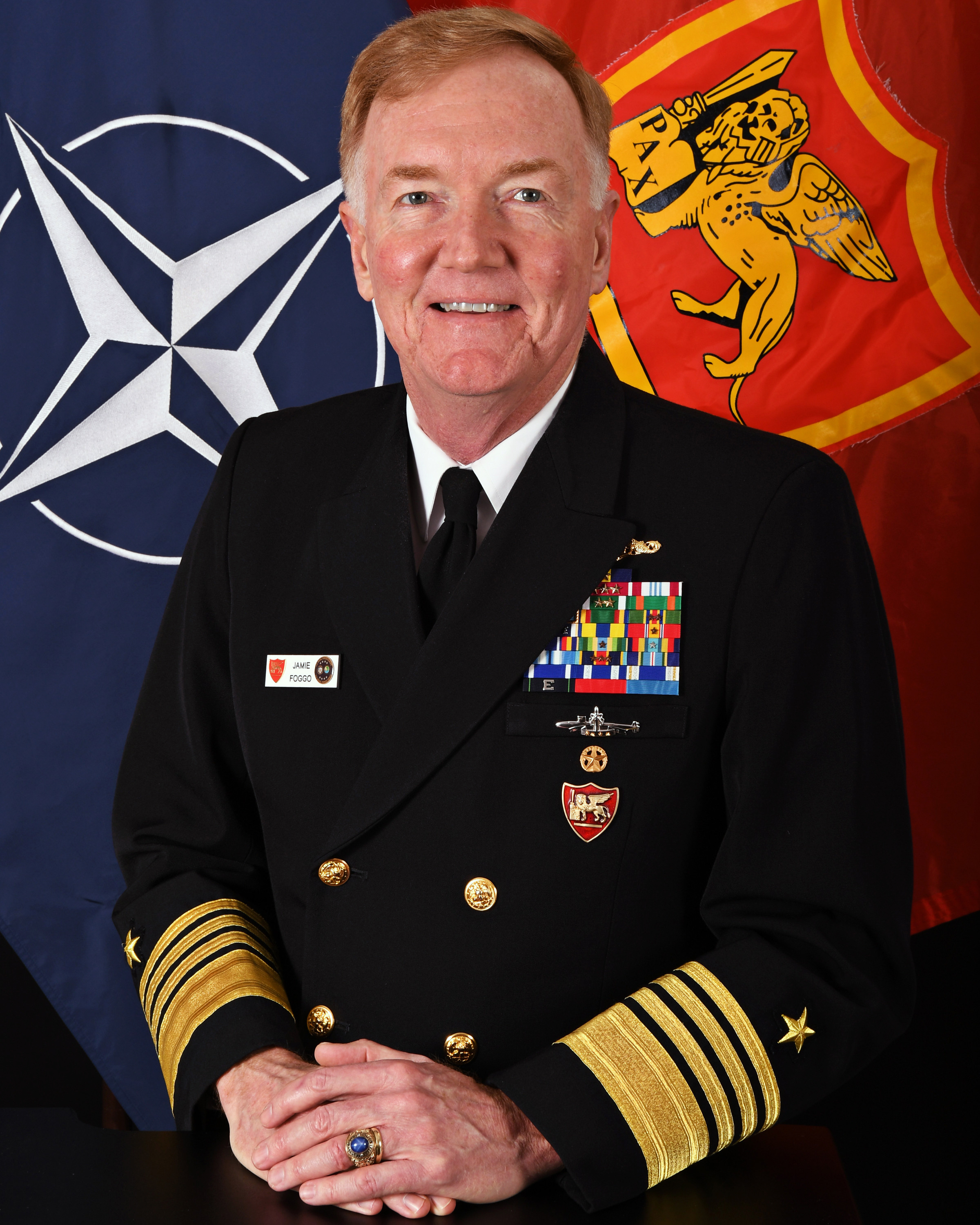
- Born: September 2, 1959 (age 67); Mönchengladbach-Rheindahlen, West Germany
- Military career
- Allegiance: United States
- Branch: United States Navy
- Service years: 1981–2020
- Rank: Admiral
- Nickname: Jamie
- Commands: United States Naval Forces Europe-Africa; Allied Joint Force Command Naples; United States Sixth Fleet; USS Oklahoma City (SSN-723)
- Awards: Defense Distinguished Service Medal; Navy Distinguished Service Medal (3); Defense Superior Service Medal (4); Legion of Merit (4)

James Gordon Foggo III MSC (born September 2, 1959) is a retired United States Navy admiral who last served as commander of United States Naval Forces Europe-Africa and commander of Allied Joint Force Command Naples. He previously served as the director of Navy Staff. Prior to that, he served as the commander of United States Sixth Fleet. He assumed his last assignment on October 20, 2017. On July 17, 2020, he relinquished command of United States Naval Forces Europe-Africa and Allied Joint Forces Command Naples to Admiral Robert P. Burke.

== Early life and education ==
Foggo was born in September 1959 in the HQ Northern Army Group in Mönchengladbach-Rheindahlen in West Germany. He is a 1981 graduate of the United States Naval Academy and a native of Virginia. He is also an Olmsted Scholar and Moreau Scholar, earning a master's degree in public administration at Harvard University and a Diplome d'Etudes Approfondies in Defense and Strategic Studies from the University of Strasbourg, France.

== Naval career ==
Foggo's sea duties include tours aboard USS Sea Devil (SSN-664), USS Mariano G. Vallejo (SSBN-658) and USS Narwhal (SSN-671). He commanded the attack submarine USS Oklahoma City (SSN-723) in 1998, which was awarded the Submarine Squadron (SUBRON) EIGHT Battle Efficiency award and the Commander Fleet Forces Command Admiral Arleigh Burke Fleet Trophy for being the most improved ship in the Atlantic Fleet. Foggo completed his major command tour as Commodore of Submarine Squadron SIX (COMSUBRON 6) in 2007.

Ashore, Foggo has served as special assistant in the Office of the Under Secretary of Defense for Acquisition and Technology; senior member of the Atlantic Fleet Nuclear Propulsion Examining Board at Commander Fleet Forces Command; executive assistant to the director of Naval Nuclear Propulsion (NAVSEA 08); division chief, Joint Staff (J5) for Western Europe and the Balkans; director, executive assistant to chairman of the Joint Chiefs of Staff; executive officer to the Supreme Allied Commander Europe (SACEUR) and commander, United States European Command, Director, Assessment Division (N81) and assistant deputy chief of naval operations (operations, plans and strategy) (N3/N5B).

In Naples, Italy, Foggo served as commander, Submarine Group 8; commander, Submarines, Allied Naval Forces South; deputy commander, United States Sixth Fleet, and director of Operations, Intelligence (N3), United States Naval Forces Europe-Africa. During this period, he served as the operations officer (J-3) for Joint Task Force Odyssey Dawn (Libya). Additionally, Foggo was a NATO Commander Task Force commander in Joint Task Force Unified Protector (Libya). In most recent assignment, Foggo commanded the United States Sixth Fleet, Naval Striking and Support Forces NATO; deputy commander, United States Naval Forces Europe; deputy commander, United States Naval Forces Africa; and Joint Force Maritime Component Commander Europe.

Foggo was responsible for conducting the NATO exercise Trident Juncture from 25 October to 7 November 2018.

== Post-retirement activities ==
Foggo is a member of the Council on Foreign Relations and the Explorer’s Club of New York, and was as of January 2023 a distinguished fellow at the Center for European Policy Analysis.

As recently as November 2021 Foggo served as the dean for the Center for Maritime Strategy, a Washington-based think tank that is a part of the Navy League of the United States.

Foggo thinks that the Fourth Battle of the Atlantic was joined already in January 2023.

== Awards and decorations ==

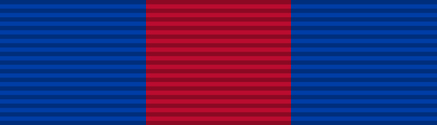

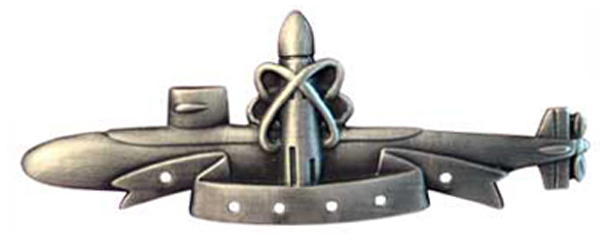

Officer Submarine Warfare insignia
Defense Distinguished Service Medal		Navy Distinguished Service Medal w/ 2 gold award stars
Defense Superior Service Medal w/ 3 bronze oak leaf clusters	Legion of Merit w/ 3 award stars	Defense Meritorious Service Medal
Meritorious Service Medal w/ 2 award stars	Navy and Marine Corps Commendation Medal w/ 2 award stars	Navy and Marine Corps Achievement Medal
Joint Meritorious Unit Award w/ 2 oak leaf clusters	Navy Unit Commendation	Navy Meritorious Unit Commendation w/ 3 bronze service stars
Navy "E" Ribbon with three Battle E awards	Navy Expeditionary Medal	National Defense Service Medal w/ 1 service star
Global War on Terrorism Service Medal	Armed Forces Service Medal w/ 1 service star	Navy Sea Service Deployment Ribbon w/ 1 silver service star
Navy Arctic Service Ribbon	Navy & Marine Corps Overseas Service Ribbon w/ 3 service stars	Coast Guard Special Operations Service Ribbon
French Legion of Honour, Knight (2017)	French National Order of Merit, Knight (2006)	Medal of the Cross of Saint-George, Commander (Portugal)
Order of Merit of the Italian Republic, Commander	Meritorious Service Cross, Military Division (Canada)	NATO Meritorious Service Medal w/ 1 service star
NATO Medal for the former Yugoslavia w/ 1 service star	Navy Expert Pistol Shot Medal	Oklahoma State Distinguished Service Medal (Not authorized for wear on a Navy uniform)
Silver SSBN Deterrent Patrol insignia (5 awards)
Command at Sea insignia
Allied Joint Force Command Naples Badge

In addition, he was awarded:

- The 1995 Admiral Charles A. Lockwood Award for Submarine Professional Excellence.
- On 4 July 2020, the Canada Gazette published that Admiral Foggo has earned the Canadian Meritorious Service Cross, permitting him to use the post-nominal letters "MSC" at the end of his name.

Military offices
Preceded by Michelle J. Howard	Commander of Allied Joint Force Command Naples; 2017–2020	Succeeded by Robert P. Burke
Preceded by Michelle J. Howard	Commander of United States Naval Forces Europe-Africa; 2017–2020	Succeeded by Robert P. Burke
