= Next Jump =

American technology and leadership-development company

- Company type: Private
- Industry: Employee benefits, leadership development, e-commerce
- Founded: 1994; 32 years ago
- Founder: Charlie Kim
- Headquarters: New York City, United States
- Area served: United States and United Kingdom
- Key people: Charlie Kim (co-CEO) · Meghan Messenger (co-CEO)
- Products: Perks at Work · Leadership in Practice · AiCoach
- Website: www.nextjump.com

Next Jump is an American privately held technology and services company headquartered in New York City, with additional offices in Boston and London. The company operates the Perks at Work employee-benefits and discounts platform and provides leadership-development and decision-making training to corporate, government and educational clients. It was founded in 1994 by Charlie Kim and is led by co-chief executives Kim and Meghan Messenger.

Next Jump is frequently cited in management literature as an example of a "deliberately developmental organization", a term popularized by Harvard academics Robert Kegan and Lisa Laskow Lahey. In 2024, Kim and Messenger were charged in a federal bribery case connected to a U.S. Navy contract; both were acquitted of all charges in May 2026.

== History ==
According to the company, Kim started the business in 1994 from his college dormitory as a printed coupon book called the Collegiate Web. The venture moved online and, in the late 1990s, began offering employee-discount products to corporate human-resources departments under names including ClickatWork and, from 2001, Corporate Perks. The company says it raised funding from angel investors during this period rather than from venture-capital or private-equity firms.

Like many internet businesses, the company contracted sharply during the dot-com bust of the early 2000s before rebuilding. In 2002 it acquired the employee-discount provider Abilizer, and in 2005 it launched operations and an office in the United Kingdom.

In 2008, Next Jump introduced WOWPoints, a loyalty currency used within its perks programs, and in 2009 it launched its ONECart checkout technology, which allows purchases from multiple retailers in a single transaction. In 2015 the company rebuilt its platform and rebranded it as Perks at Work, which it has since expanded to dozens of countries. A Perks at Work mobile app was released in 2025.

== Products and services ==
=== Perks at Work ===
Perks at Work is Next Jump's employee-benefits and discounts marketplace, offered to employers as a workplace perk. The platform aggregates retailer offers and incorporates the company's WOWPoints loyalty currency and ONECart multi-retailer checkout system.

=== Leadership development ===
Beginning around 2010, Next Jump expanded into leadership and culture training, work it later marketed externally to corporate, military and educational organizations. In 2018 the company began providing leadership and decision-making training to a U.S. Navy office under a government contract.

During the COVID-19 pandemic, Next Jump launched free public-facing programs, including an online learning series and a weekly leadership class, later distributed as the Leadership in Practice podcast. In late 2024 it released AiCoach, an artificial intelligence coaching tool the company says is trained on material from its leadership programming; a mobile version followed in 2026.

== Partnerships and acquisitions ==
=== FlightCaster ===
In January 2011, Next Jump acquired FlightCaster, a startup that used data analysis to predict flight delays.

=== LivingSocial ===
In April 2011, LivingSocial announced a partnership allowing it to present its daily deals to consumers within the Next Jump network. In June 2011 the companies launched OO.com, a site offering local deals with reward points.

== Management philosophy ==
Next Jump is featured as a case study in the 2016 book An Everyone Culture: Becoming a Deliberately Developmental Organization by Robert Kegan and Lisa Laskow Lahey, which presents it as an example of an organization whose culture is designed around the development of its employees. The company is known internally for practices including peer coaching, a stated no-firing policy, and an emphasis on candid feedback. It was also referenced by author Simon Sinek in his work on organizational trust and safety.

== Navy contract case ==
On May 31, 2024, federal prosecutors charged retired U.S. Navy admiral Robert P. Burke, a former Vice Chief of Naval Operations, along with Next Jump co-CEOs Charlie Kim and Meghan Messenger, in connection with an alleged bribery scheme. Prosecutors alleged that the executives offered Burke a senior post-retirement role, including a $500,000 salary and stock options, in exchange for steering a Navy workforce-training contract to the company and promoting its products to other Navy leaders. The pilot contract, awarded in 2018, was terminated by the Navy after about a year.

Burke was tried separately and, in 2025, convicted of conspiracy and bribery; he was sentenced in September 2025 to six years in prison.

A first trial of Kim and Messenger ended in September 2025 with a hung jury and a mistrial. At their retrial in the United States District Court for the District of Columbia, a jury acquitted both executives of all charges, including conspiracy and bribery, on May 18, 2026. Their defense attorneys said the verdict reflected that jurors did not believe the executives had bribed anyone. The acquittals did not affect Burke's earlier conviction.
