= John B. Nowell =

US Navy officer (born 1962)

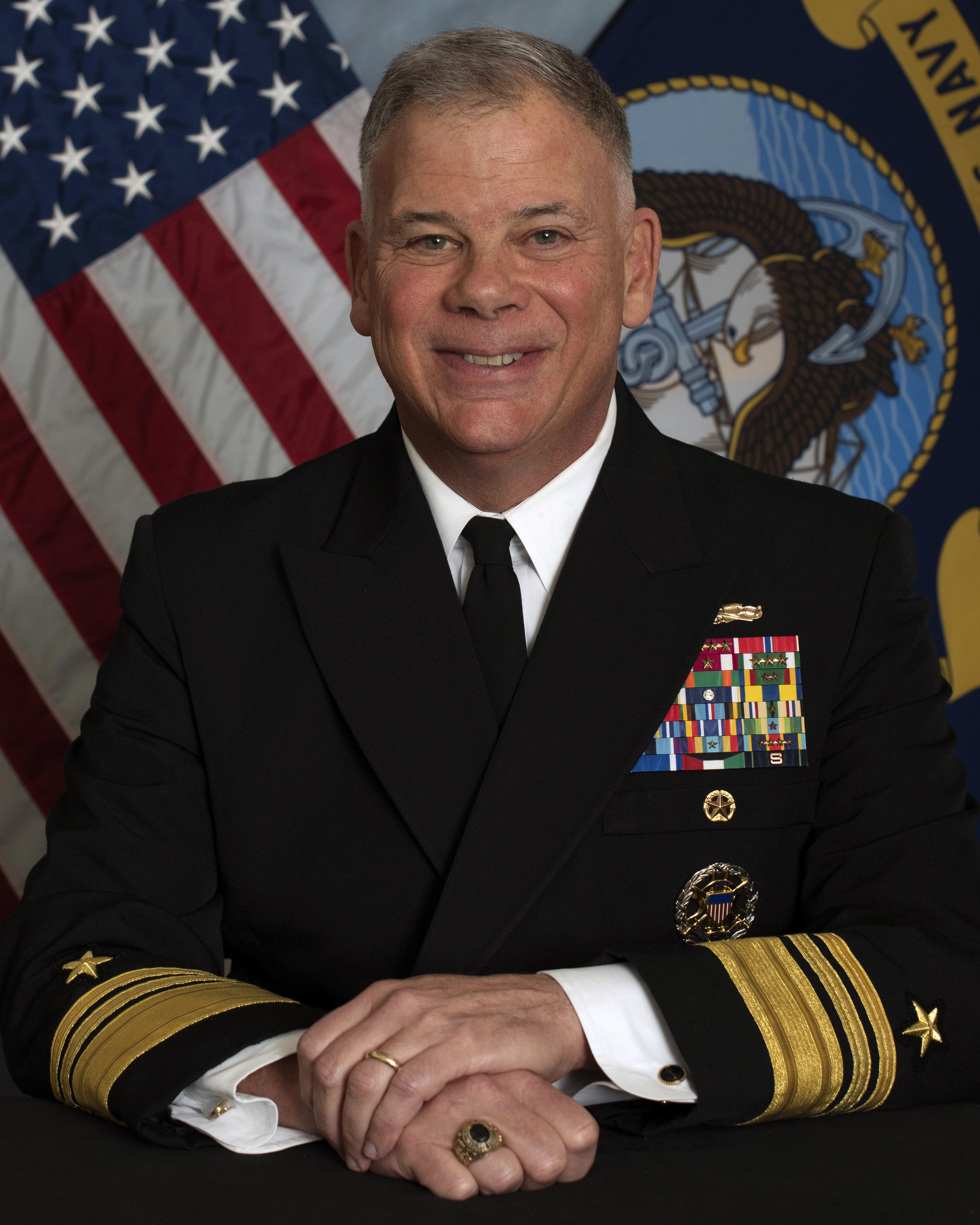
- Born: 1962 (age 63–64)
- Military career
- Allegiance: United States
- Branch: United States Navy
- Service years: 1984–2022
- Rank: Vice Admiral
- Commands: Chief of Naval Personnel; Task Force 76; Destroyer Squadron 60; USS Porter (DDG 78)
- Conflicts: Gulf War
- Awards: Navy Distinguished Service Medal; Legion of Merit (6); Bronze Star Medal
- John B. Nowell's voice Nowell's opening statement at a House Armed Services Military Personnel Subcommittee hearing on talent management and reorganization Recorded February 8, 2022

John Blackwelder Nowell Jr. (born 1962) is a retired vice admiral in the United States Navy. Nowell assumed duties as the navy's 59th Chief of Naval Personnel on May 24, 2019. Nowell is a distinguished graduate of the United States Naval Academy with a Bachelor of Science in Ocean Engineering and holds a Master of Science in Weapons Systems Engineering from the Naval Postgraduate School.

== Naval career ==
Nowell's operational tours have spanned the Atlantic and Pacific Fleets to include forward deployed naval forces in Europe and the Western Pacific. He served aboard the USS Callaghan (DDG 994), USS Bunker Hill (CG 52), USS Arleigh Burke (DDG 51), and USS The Sullivans (DDG 68). He commanded USS Porter (DDG 78), and Destroyer Squadron 60/Task Force 65. He also served as the maritime force commander (Combined Task Force-Bravo) for Joint Task Force Lebanon, Commander of Task Force West and Central Africa (CTF-365), and commander of the inaugural Africa Partnership Station deployment.

Nowell's staff assignments included tours on the staff of the Chief of Naval Operations in the Surface Warfare Directorate (N86), and executive assistant to the Director of Theater Air Warfare (N865); chief of the Theater Air and Missile Defense Branch (J-38); head of the Washington Placement Branch (PERS-441), executive assistant to the Commander, Navy Personnel Command/Naval Personnel Development Command, and director, Surface Warfare Distribution Division (PERS-41). Nowell also served as director of the Navy Senate Liaison Office in Washington D.C.

As a flag officer, Nowell served as chief of staff and director, Strategy, Resources, and Plans (N5/8) on the staff of Commander, United States Naval Forces Europe and Africa/U.S. Sixth Fleet in Naples, Italy; Commander, Amphibious Force Seventh Fleet/Expeditionary Strike Group Seven/Task Force 76 in Okinawa, Japan, and most recently as director, Military Personnel Plans and Policy (OPNAV N13).

Nowell assumed duties as the 59th Chief of Naval Personnel on May 24, 2019. Serving concurrently as the deputy chief of naval operations (manpower, personnel, training and education) (N1), he was responsible for the planning and programming of all manpower, personnel, training and education resources for the United States Navy. As CNP, he led more than 26,000 people engaged in the recruiting, talent management, training and development of Navy personnel. His responsibilities included overseeing Navy Recruiting Command, Navy Personnel Command and Naval Education and Training Command. He relinquished the position to Vice Admiral Richard Cheeseman Jr. on June 3, 2022.

Nowell's awards include the Navy Distinguished Service Medal, Legion of Merit (six awards), Bronze Star Medal, and various other personal, unit and campaign awards. Every ship that he has been assigned to has won the Battle Efficiency "E" award, and USS Porter (DDG 78) also won the Anti-Submarine Warfare "Bloodhound" award. Nowell was also the recipient of the 1987 Pacific Fleet Junior Officer Shiphandling Award.

Military offices
Preceded by Hugh D. Wetherald	Commander of Task Force 76; 2015–2016	Succeeded by Marc H. Dalton
Preceded by Robert P. Burke	Director of Military Personnel Plans and Policy of the United States Navy; 2016–2019	Succeeded by Jeffrey Jablon
Preceded by Robert P. Burke	Chief of Naval Personnel; 2019–2022	Succeeded by Richard J. Cheeseman Jr.
