= Robert P. Burke =

US Navy admiral

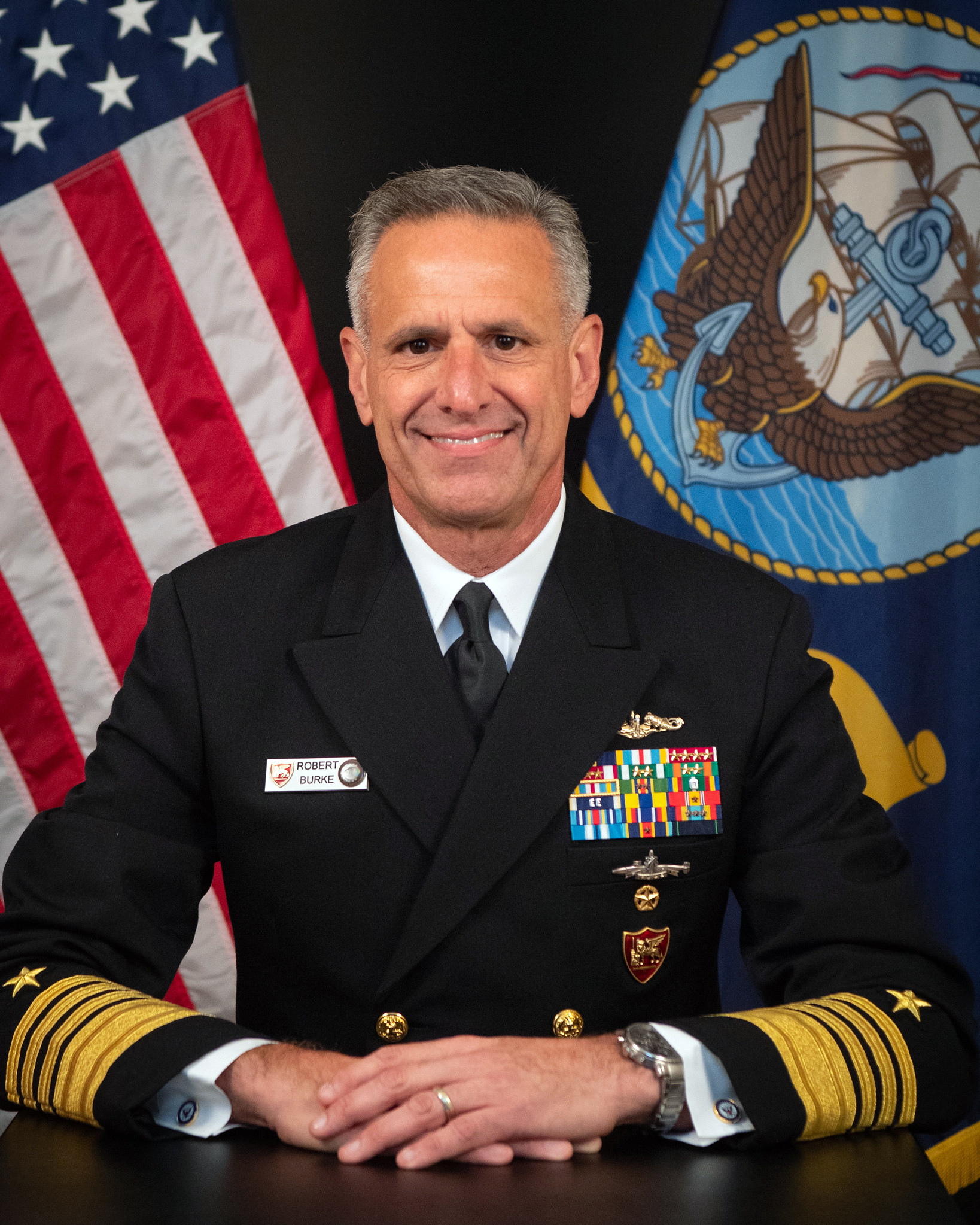
- Admiral Robert P. Burke in July 2020
- Born: 1962 (age 63–64)
- Military career
- Allegiance: United States
- Branch: United States Navy
- Service years: 1983–2022
- Rank: Admiral
- Commands: United States Naval Forces Europe-Africa; Allied Joint Force Command Naples; Vice Chief of Naval Operations; Chief of Naval Personnel; Submarine Group 8 USS Hampton (SSN-767)
- Awards: Defense Distinguished Service Medal; Navy Distinguished Service Medal (2); Defense Superior Service Medal; Legion of Merit (5); Officer of the Order of Australia (Australia)

Robert Peter Burke (born 1962) is a retired United States Navy admiral and convicted criminal who served as the commander of United States Naval Forces Europe-Africa and Allied Joint Force Command Naples from 17 July 2020 to 27 June 2022. He was the 58th Chief of Naval Personnel from 27 May 2016 to 23 May 2019 and Vice Chief of Naval Operations from 10 June 2019 until 29 May 2020.

On May 31, 2024, Burke was arrested on charges of taking bribes while serving as commander of U.S Naval Forces Europe-Africa. On May 19, 2025 Burke was convicted on all charges, and on September 16, 2025, he was sentenced to six years in prison. As of October 2026, the Bureau of Prisons indicates he is incarcerated at USP Hazelton with a projected release date of September 8, 2029.

== Early life and education ==
Burke was raised in Portage, Michigan. He holds bachelor's and master's degrees in electrical engineering from Western Michigan University and the University of Central Florida.

== Naval career ==
Burke's operational assignments included service in attack and ballistic missile submarines, including USS Von Steuben (SSBN-632), USS Maryland (SSBN-738), and USS Bremerton (SSN-698). He deployed to the Arctic, north Atlantic, Mediterranean, and Western Pacific.

Burke commanded USS Hampton (SSN-767) in Norfolk, Virginia, and was commodore of Submarine Development Squadron (DEVRON) 12 in Groton, Connecticut. During his tenure as commanding officer, Burke was recognized by the United States Submarine League with the Jack Darby Award for Leadership for 2004, and the Vice Admiral James Bond Stockdale Award for Inspirational Leadership for 2005.

Burke's staff assignments included tours as an instructor and director of the Officer Department Electrical Engineering Division at Naval Nuclear Power School in Orlando, Florida; junior board member on the Pacific Fleet Nuclear Propulsion Examining Board; and as the Submarine Officer Community manager/Nuclear Officer Program manager in the office of the Director, Military Personnel Plans and Policy Division (N13).

Following command, Burke held assignments as a senior member, Tactical Readiness Evaluation Team, on the staff of Commander, Submarine Force, United States Atlantic Fleet; as the deputy director for Operations, Strategy and Policy Directorate (J5), at United States Joint Forces Command; as the division director, Submarine/Nuclear Power Distribution (PERS-42) and Nuclear Propulsion Program Manager (N133), Director, Joint and Fleet Operations (N3/N5), The United States Fleet Forces Command; and deputy commander, United States Sixth Fleet, director of Operations (N3), United States Naval Forces Europe-Africa and commander, Submarine Group 8.

Burke was awarded an Honorary Officer of the Order of Australia on 24 August 2020; his citation reads: "For distinguished service in strengthening the military alliance between Australia and the United States of America".

Burke retired from active duty in 2022.

== Next Jump and arrest ==
After retiring from the Navy, Burke took a job at Next Jump, a provider of services to companies.

Burke was arrested on 31 May 2024. A press release by the Department of Justice said he allegedly steered a Navy contract toward a company—apparently Next Jump—in exchange for a post-retirement job. Next Jump co-CEOs Charles Kim and Meghan Messenger were arrested as well.

== Awards and decorations ==

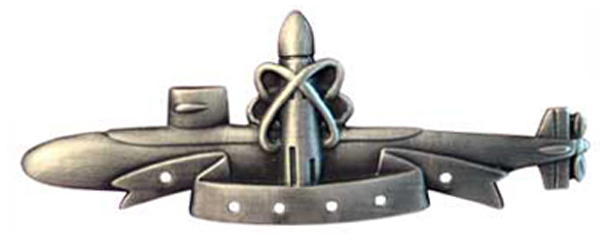

Officer Submarine Warfare insignia
Defense Distinguished Service Medal | Navy Distinguished Service Medal with one gold award star
Defense Superior Service Medal	Legion of Merit with four award stars	Meritorious Service Medal with two award stars
Navy and Marine Corps Commendation Medal with two award stars	Navy and Marine Corps Achievement Medal with two award stars	Joint Meritorious Unit Award
Coast Guard Unit Commendation with "O" device	Navy Meritorious Unit Commendation with two bronze service stars	Navy E Ribbon (2 awards)
Navy Expeditionary Medal	National Defense Service Medal with one bronze service star	Global War on Terrorism Expeditionary Medal
Global War on Terrorism Service Medal	Navy Sea Service Deployment Ribbon with three service stars	Navy Arctic Service Ribbon
Navy and Marine Corps Overseas Service Ribbon with service star	Order of Australia, Military Division (Honorary Officer)	Navy Pistol Marksmanship Ribbon
Silver SSBN Deterrent Patrol insignia (14 awards)
Command at Sea insignia
Allied Joint Force Command Naples Badge

The Naval Submarine League recognized Burke with the Jack Darby Award for Leadership in 2004. Burke also received the Vice Admiral James Bond Stockdale Award for Inspirational Leadership in 2005.

Military offices
Preceded by Andrew L. Lewis	Director of Joint and Fleet Operations of United States Fleet Forces Command; 201?–2013	Succeeded by ???
Preceded by Fritz Roegge	Director of Operations of United States Naval Forces Europe-Africa, Deputy Commander of the United States Sixth Fleet, and Commander of Submarine Group 8; 2013–2015	Succeeded by Daryl Caudle
Preceded by Fritz Roegge	Director of Military Personnel Plans and Policy of the United States Navy; 2015–2016	Succeeded by John B. Nowell
Preceded by William F. Moran	Chief of Naval Personnel; 2016–2019	Succeeded by John B. Nowell
Preceded by William F. Moran	Vice Chief of Naval Operations; 2019–2020	Succeeded by William K. Lescher
Preceded by James G. Foggo III	Commander of Allied Joint Force Command Naples and United States Naval Forces Europe-Africa; 2020–2022	Succeeded by Stuart B. Munsch
