= William K. Lescher =

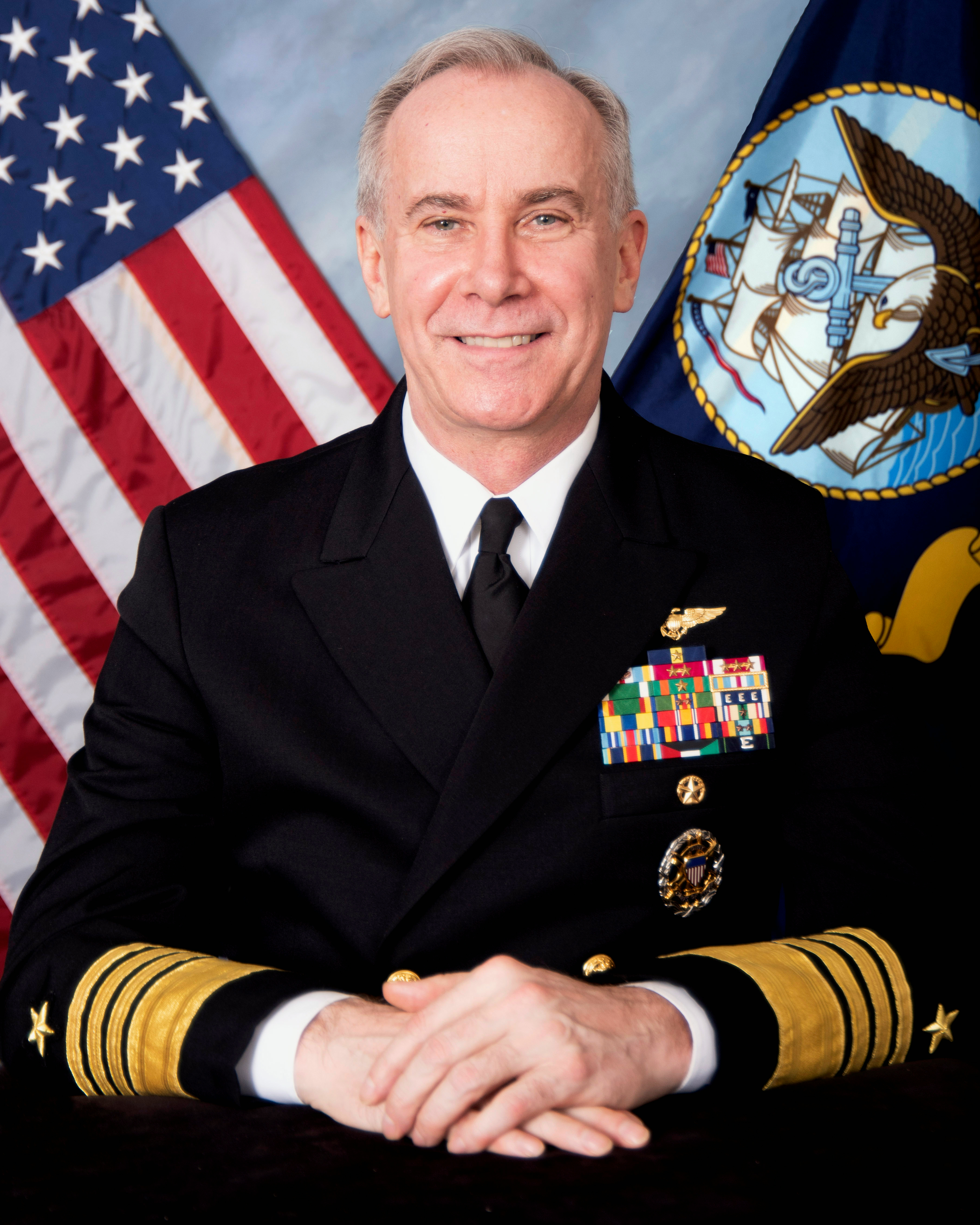
- Born: 1958 (age 67–68); Highland Park, Illinois, US
- Military career
- Branch: United States Navy
- Service years: 1980–2022
- Rank: Admiral
- Nickname: Bill
- Commands: Vice Chief of Naval Operations; Expeditionary Strike Group 5 Atlantic Fleet Helicopter Maritime Strike Wing; HSL-40; HSL-48
- Conflicts: Gulf War
- Awards: Navy Distinguished Service Medal (2); Defense Superior Service Medal (3); Legion of Merit (3)

William Kevin Lescher (born 1958) is a retired four-star admiral in the United States Navy who last served as the 41st Vice Chief of Naval Operations. He held this office from May 29, 2020, to September 2, 2022. Lescher was also the "Old Goat", the longest serving Naval Academy graduate on active duty, from 2018 to 2022.

== Naval career ==
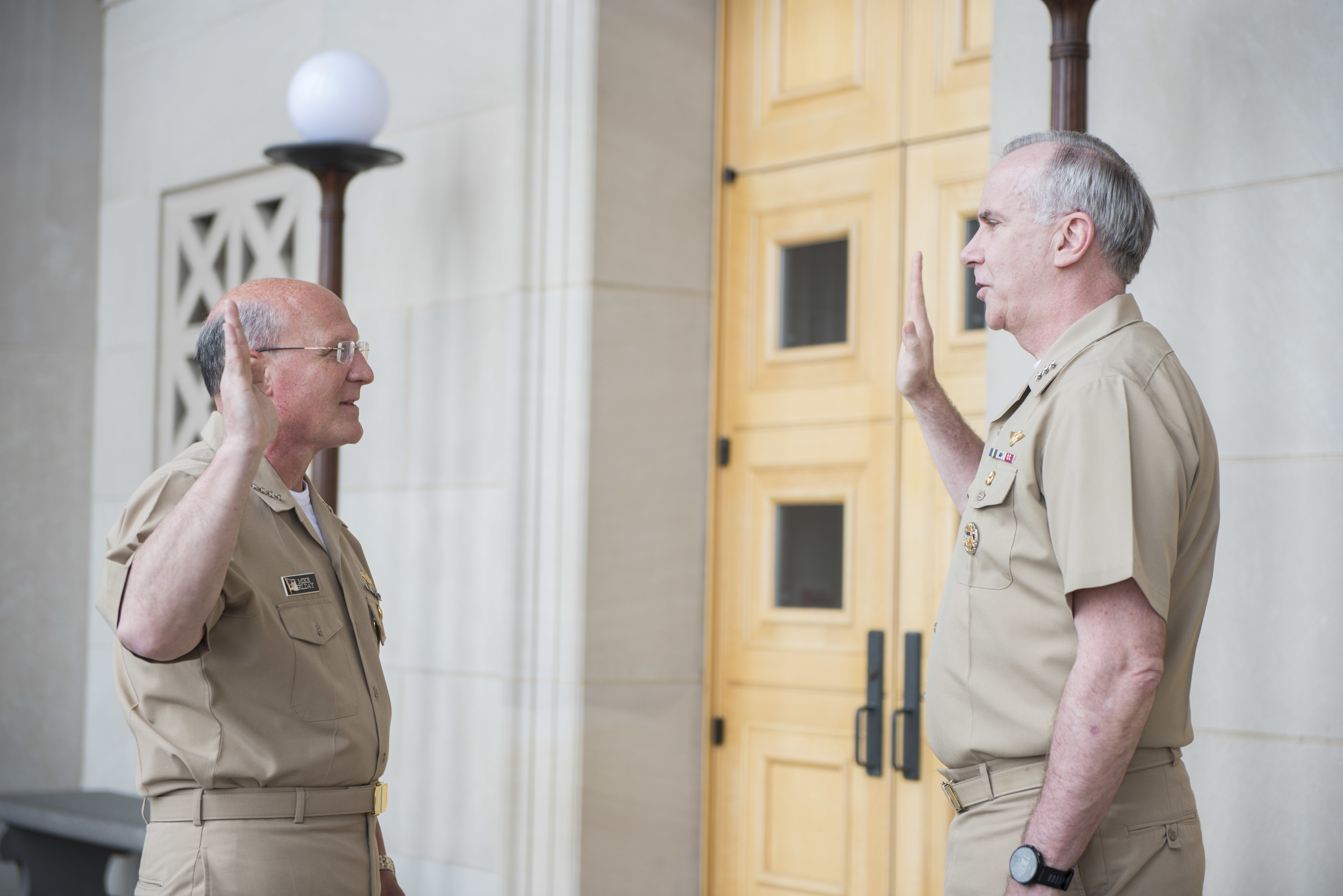
Lescher is sworn in as Vice Chief of Naval Operations on May 29, 2020.

A native of Highland Park, Illinois, he graduated from the United States Naval Academy in 1980. Trained as a helicopter pilot, Lescher served with HSL-36 and HSL-44 and later commanded HSL-48, HSL-40, the Atlantic Fleet Helicopter Maritime Strike Wing, Expeditionary Strike Group Five and Task Forces 51/59 in Bahrain.

In May 2020, Lescher was nominated by President Donald Trump for promotion to admiral and assignment as the next Vice Chief of Naval Operations. He assumed this office and rank on May 29, 2020.

== Awards and decorations ==
Naval Aviator insignia
Command at Sea insignia
Office of the Joint Chiefs of Staff Identification Badge

Navy Distinguished Service Medal with one gold award star
Defense Superior Service Medal with two bronze oak leaf clusters
Legion of Merit with two award stars
Meritorious Service Medal with three award stars
Navy and Marine Corps Commendation Medal
Navy and Marine Corps Achievement Medal with award star
Joint Meritorious Unit Award
Navy Unit Commendation
Navy Meritorious Unit Commendation with two bronze service stars
Navy "E" Ribbon with three Battle E awards
Navy Expeditionary Medal
National Defense Service Medal with service star
Southwest Asia Service Medal with service star
Global War on Terrorism Expeditionary Medal
Global War on Terrorism Service Medal
Navy Sea Service Deployment Ribbon with two service stars
Navy and Marine Corps Overseas Service Ribbon
Kuwait Liberation Medal (Kuwait)
Navy Expert Pistol Shot Medal

- Lescher graduated with distinction from fixed wing, rotary wing and Naval Test Pilot School training. He has been recognized as the Association of Naval Aviation's HSL Pilot of the Year, the Naval Helicopter Association's Regional Pilot of the Year and the Naval Air Warfare Center's Rotary Wing Test Pilot of the Year. The units in which he has served have earned the Joint Meritorious Unit Award, Navy Unit Commendation, Navy Meritorious Unit Commendation, Navy "E" Ribbons and Theodore Ellyson award.

Military offices
Preceded by ???	Deputy Director for Resources and Acquisition of the Joint Staff; 201?–2015	Succeeded by Hugh Wetherald
Preceded by ???	Deputy Assistant Secretary of the Navy for Budget and Director of Fiscal Management of the United States Navy; 2015–2018	Succeeded by Randy B. Crites
Preceded by Joseph Mulloy	Deputy Chief of Naval Operations for Integration of Capabilities and Resources of the United States Navy; 2020	Succeeded by Randy B. Crites
Preceded by Robert P. Burke	Vice Chief of Naval Operations; 2020–2022	Succeeded by Lisa M. Franchetti
