= William F. Moran (admiral) =

US Navy Admiral

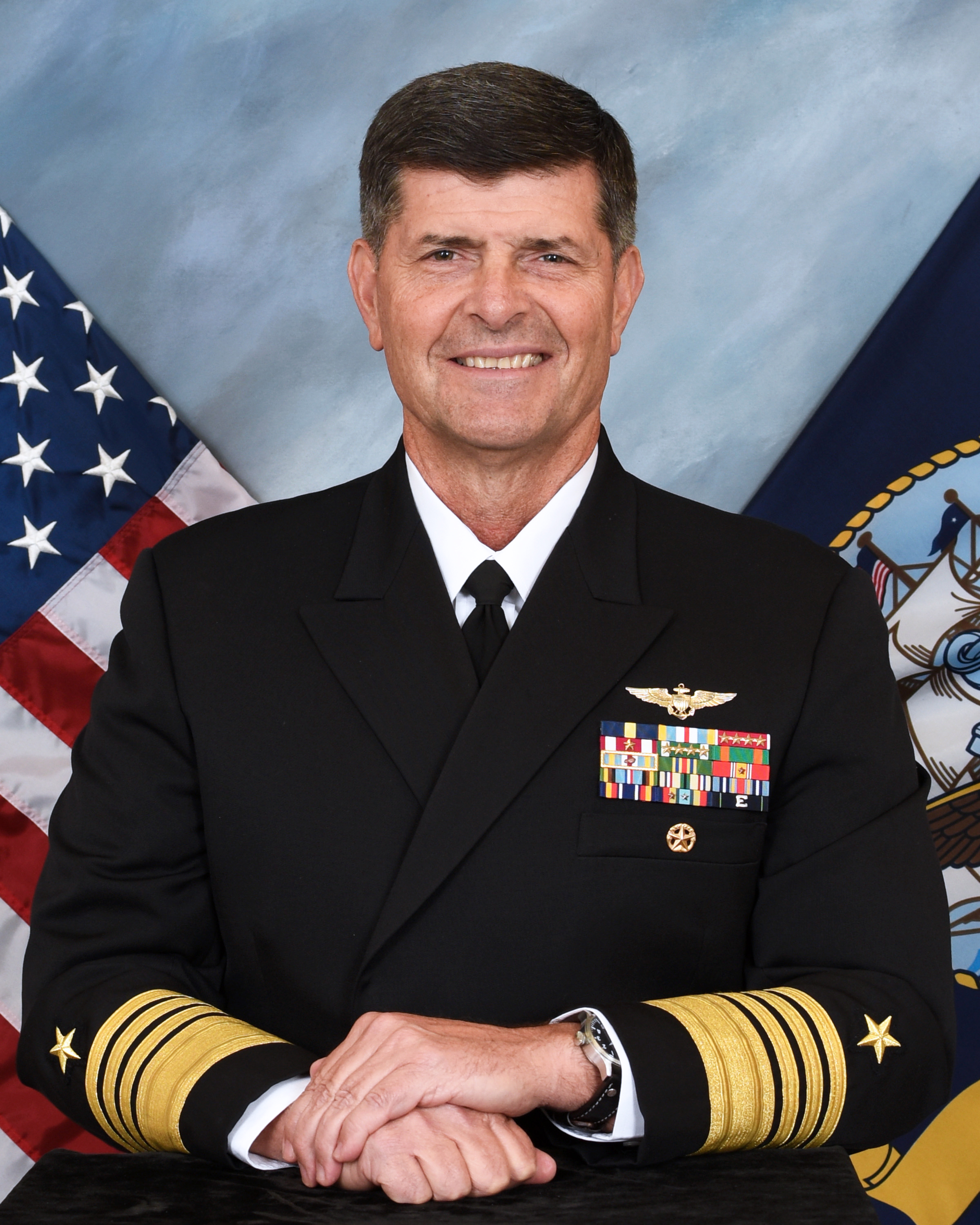
- Moran in September 2016
- Born: 1958 (age 67–68); New York, US
- Military career
- Branch: United States Navy
- Service years: 1981–2019
- Rank: Admiral
- Commands: Vice Chief of Naval Operations; Chief of Naval Personnel; Patrol and Reconnaissance Wing 2 Patrol Squadron 46
- Awards: Navy Distinguished Service Medal (2); Defense Superior Service Medal; Legion of Merit (5)

William Francis Moran (born 1958) is a United States Navy admiral who served as the 39th Vice Chief of Naval Operations from May 31, 2016, to June 10, 2019. He previously served as the Chief of Naval Personnel and Deputy Chief of Naval Operations for Manpower, Personnel, Training and Education (N1) from August 2, 2013, to May 27, 2016.

In April 2019, Moran was nominated to the post of Chief of Naval Operations, and was confirmed to the position by the U.S. Senate in May 2019. However, in early July 2019—before he could assume the position on August 1, 2019—he declined the CNO post and retired from the Navy, citing an inspector general investigation into the use of his personal email account for Navy business and "or continuing to maintain a professional relationship with a former staff officer, now retired, who had while in uniform been investigated and held accountable over allegations of inappropriate behavior."

== Early life and education ==
William Francis Moran was born and raised in New York. He graduated from Valley Central High School in 1977, and received a Bachelor of Science degree from the United States Naval Academy in 1981 and a master's degree from the National War College in 2006.

== Naval career ==
A P-3 Orion pilot with operational tours spanning both coasts, Moran commanded Patrol Squadron 46 and Patrol and Reconnaissance Wing 2, and served extensively as an instructor pilot in multiple operational tours and in two tours with Patrol Squadron 30. The additional operational tour included staff members for the commander of Carrier Group 6 aboard USS Forrestal.

Ashore, Moran served as assistant Washington placement officer and assistant flag officer detailer in the Bureau of Naval Personnel; executive assistant to Commander, U.S. Pacific Command; deputy director, Navy staff; and executive assistant to the Chief of Naval Operations. As a flag officer, he served as commander, Patrol and Reconnaissance Group and director, Air Warfare (N98) on the staff of the chief of naval operations.

Moran assumed duties as the Navy's 57th Chief of Naval Personnel on August 2, 2013. Serving concurrently as the Deputy Chief of Naval Operations, he was responsible for the planning and programming of all manpower, personnel, training and education resources for the United States Navy. He managed an annual operating budget of $29 billion and led more than 26,000 employees engaged in the recruiting, personnel management, training and development of Navy personnel. His responsibilities included overseeing Navy Recruiting Command, Navy Personnel Command, and Naval Education and Training Command.

Moran was the 39th Vice Chief of Naval Operations from May 31, 2016, to June 10, 2019.

=== Appointment as Chief of Naval Operations and retirement ===
On April 11, 2019, Moran was nominated for appointment as Chief of Naval Operations. He was confirmed for the position by the U.S. Senate on May 23, 2019. He was due to assume the position on August 1, 2019. However, on July 8, 2019, he announced that he would instead decline the post and retire based on "an open investigation into the nature of some of my personal email correspondence over the past couple of years and for continuing to maintain a professional relationship with a former staff officer, now retired, who had while in uniform been investigated and held accountable over allegations of inappropriate behavior." The Outgoing Chief of Naval Operations, Admiral John Richardson, praised Moran's 38 years of Navy service, calling him "a close friend and colleague" and "superb Naval Officer and leader."

The Department of Defense Office of Inspector General (OIG) issued a report on the outcome of its investigation in August 2019. The OIG determined that Moran's use of a personal email account to send official military communications violated Department of Defense policies. OIG also found that Moran frequently communicated using the personal email account with a Navy commander who had been removed from the CNO's staff in 2017 for "inappropriate behavior towards junior female officers and a female civilian employee." OIG found that this Moran's continued relationship with the Navy commander did not violate any Navy policy and was a "performance issue" rather than misconduct. In his response to the OIG's conclusions, Moran acknowledged using his personal email account for military business, but stressed that he had never used the account to exchange classified information. With respect to his communications with the former Navy commander, Moran said that he regretted that some viewed "my continuing professional relationship with this Navy commander as insensitive, inappropriate, or wrong" and said that he believed in "a balance between accountability and redemption."

== Awards and decorations ==

Naval Aviator Badge
Navy Distinguished Service Medal with one award star	Defense Superior Service Medal	Legion of Merit with four award stars
Meritorious Service Medal with one award star	Navy and Marine Corps Commendation Medal with four award stars	Navy and Marine Corps Achievement Medal
Joint Meritorious Unit Award with one bronze oak leaf cluster	Navy Meritorious Unit Commendation	National Defense Service Medal with one bronze service star
Armed Forces Expeditionary Medal	Southwest Asia Service Medal with one bronze service star	Global War on Terrorism Expeditionary Medal
Global War on Terrorism Service Medal	Navy Sea Service Deployment Ribbon with one silver and one bronze service stars	Navy Expert Pistol Shot Medal
Command at Sea insignia

Military offices
Preceded by Michelle J. Howard	Vice Chief of Naval Operations; 2016–2019	Succeeded by Robert P. Burke
