= Robert B. Baldwin =

American Vice admiral

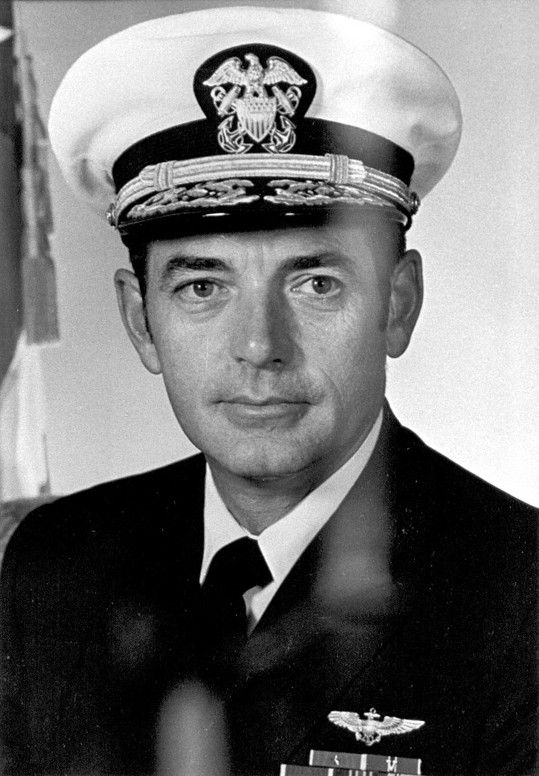
- Born: April 24, 1923; Minneapolis, Minnesota, U.S.
- Died: April 7, 2017 (aged 93); Gig Harbor, Washington, U.S.
- Military career
- Allegiance: United States
- Branch: United States Navy
- Service years: 1944–1980
- Rank: Vice admiral
- Commands: Chief of Naval Personnel; United States Seventh Fleet
- Awards: Distinguished Service Medal (2); Legion of Merit (2); Bronze Star Medal; Purple Heart

Robert Bemus Baldwin (April 24, 1923 – April 7, 2017) was a vice admiral in the United States Navy. He was a former commander of the United States Seventh Fleet (from July 24, 1976 – May 31, 1978). He also was a former Deputy Chief of Naval Personnel and Commander Naval Air Force, Pacific Fleet. He was a 1944 graduate of the United States Naval Academy. He retired in 1980 and died in 2017.

Baldwin was one of the 32 finalists for NASA Astronaut Group 1 in 1959, but ultimately was not selected.
