= Laurance T. DuBose =

United States Navy admiral (1893–1967)

Laurance Toombs DuBose
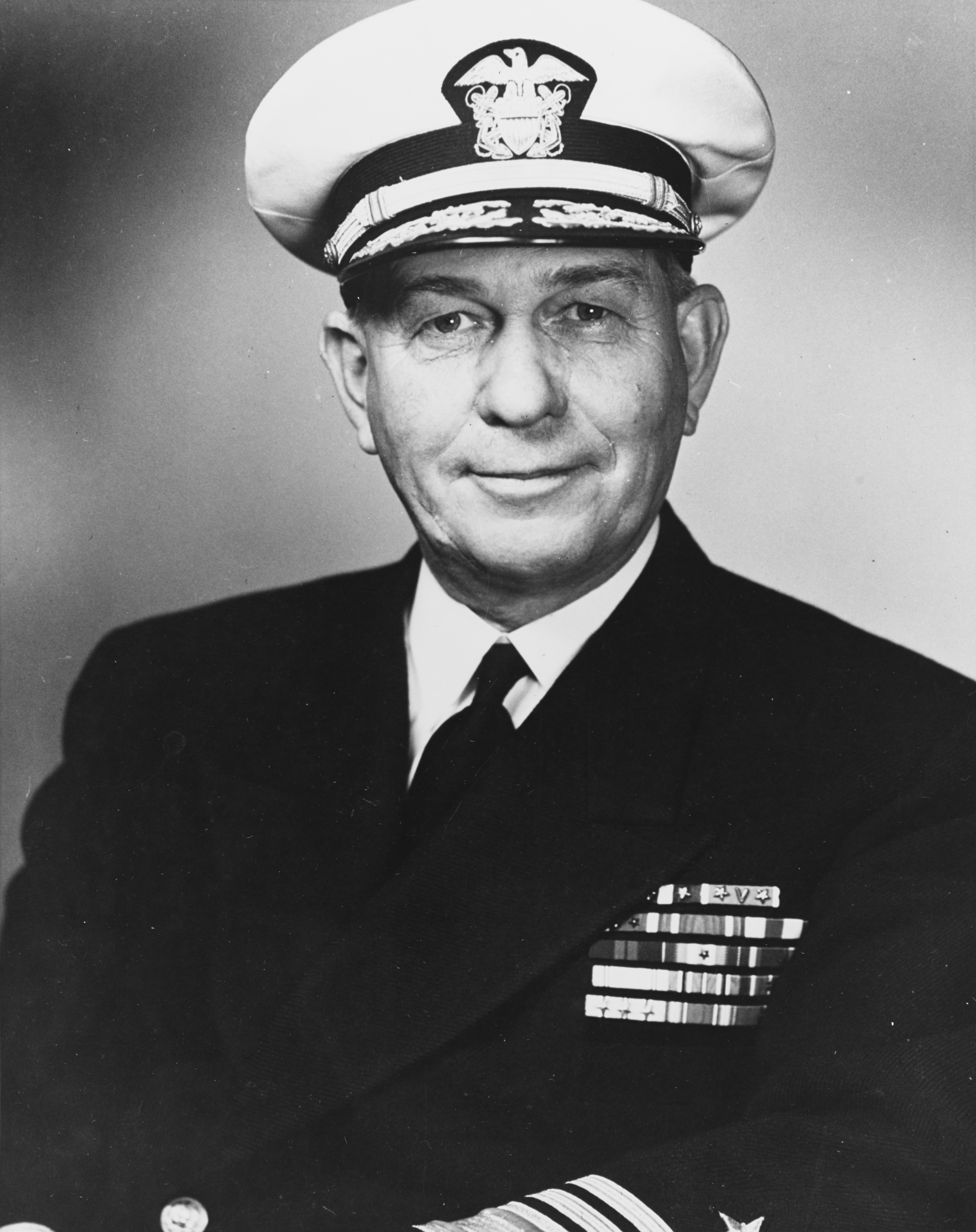
- ADM Laurance T. DuBose, USN
- Born: May 21, 1893; Washington, D.C., US
- Died: July 11, 1967 (aged 74); Charleston, South Carolina, US
- Burial place: Arlington National Cemetery
- Military career
- Allegiance: United States of America
- Branch: United States Navy
- Service years: 1913–1955
- Rank: Admiral
- Nickname: "Dubie"
- Commands: Eastern Sea Frontier; Chief of Naval Personnel; United States First Fleet; Sixth Naval district Cruiser Division 13; USS Portland
- Conflicts: Veracruz Expedition; World War I World War II: Battle of Midway; Naval Battle of Guadalcanal; Aleutian Islands campaign; Battle of the Eastern Solomons; Battle of the Santa Cruz Islands; Invasion of Sicily; Battle of the Philippine Sea; Formosa Air Battle; Battle of Leyte
- Awards: Navy Cross (3); Legion of Merit (3); Navy Commendation Medal (2)

Laurance Toombs DuBose (May 21, 1893 – July 11, 1967) was a highly decorated officer in the United States Navy with the rank of four-star Admiral. A veteran of several conflicts, including both World Wars, he distinguished himself several times as commanding officer of heavy cruiser USS Portland and commander, Cruiser Division 13 in the Pacific theater of World War II and received three awards of Navy Cross, the United States Navy second-highest decoration awarded for valor in combat.

DuBose remained in the Navy following the War and held several other important assignments including commander, Eastern Sea Frontier; Chief of Naval Personnel; Commander-in-Chief, United States First Fleet; and commandant, Sixth Naval district. He retired in June 1955 and was advanced to the rank of admiral on the retired list for having been specially commended in combat.

== Early career ==
Laurance T. DuBose was born on May 21, 1893, in Washington, D.C., the only son of Dr. George P. DuBose and Louise Toombs. He graduated from the Western High School in Washington in summer 1909 and received an appointment to the United States Naval Academy at Annapolis, Maryland. While at the academy, DuBose was active in Muscle-bound and was nicknamed "Dubie".

Among his classmates were several future flag officers including four-star admirals William H. P. Blandy and John L. Hall Jr.; Vice admirals Glenn B. Davis, Paul Hendren, Arthur G. Robinson, Leo H. Thebaud; and Rear admirals Frederick G. Crisp, Norman C. Gillette and Paulus P. Powell.

DuBose graduated with Bachelor of Science degree on June 7, 1913, and was commissioned ensign on that date. He was subsequently assigned to the battleship USS Connecticut and took part in naval blockade of Veracruz during Mexican Revolution in April and May 1914. The Connecticut then made a stop in Havana, Cuba and participated in the transport of Regiment of Marines and supplies to Haiti for U.S. occupation forces there. She then transported United States Ambassador to Haiti, Madison R. Smith to Port-au-Prince and remained patrolling in the near waters until December 1915.

Upon return to the United States one month later, DuBose was transferred to battleship USS Texas and took part in the training operations along the New England coast and off the Virginia Capes and winter fleet tactical and gunnery drills in the West Indies. He was promoted to Lieutenant (junior grade) on June 7, 1916.

Following the declaration of the War on Germany on April 6, 1917, DuBose was transferred to battleship USS Alabama and assumed duty as Engineer officer under Captain Edwin T. Pollock. For his new assignment, he was promoted to the temporary rank of lieutenant on August 31, 1917. The Alabama then served as a training ship for Midshipmen and occasionally took part in the patrols with the Atlantic Fleet.

He served in this capacity until March 1918, when he was transferred to Bureau of Navigation in Washington, D.C., where he served under Rear Admiral Leigh C. Palmer until December 1919. While in Washington, DuBose was promoted to the temporary rank of lieutenant commander on November 5, 1918.

== Interwar period ==
DuBose was subsequently transferred to New York Shipbuilding Corporation in Camden, New Jersey, where he conducted duty in connection with fitting out of destroyer USS Kane. The Kane was commissioned in June 1920 and DuBose assumed duty as her executive officer. He then participated in her shakedown cruise to Gibraltar, Brest, Copenhagen, Gdańsk, and the Gulf of Riga.

After relief works in Turkish waters near Constantinople, DuBose was ordered back to the United States and assumed command of destroyer USS Lansdale in August 1921. His vessel served with the Mine Force, Atlantic Fleet and practiced laying mines off the New England and Virginia coasts until late October that year. DuBose then conducted same kind of operations off Culebra, Puerto Rico, before he was appointed aide on the staff of Mine Squadron One under Captain William D. Leahy in April 1922.

DuBose spent following months aboard Leahy's flagship USS Shawmut, operating along the East Coast of the United States and later also in the Caribbean. He was ordered back to Washington, D.C., in July 1923 and assigned to the Administrative Division of the Bureau of Aeronautics under Rear Admiral William A. Moffett.

In July 1926, DuBose assumed duty as a Navigator of light cruiser USS Richmond under Captain Alfred Wilkinson Johnson. The Richmond served as flagship of commander, light cruiser division, Rear Admiral Thomas P. Magruder and DuBose participated in the exercises in Hawaiian waters and then in the patrolling near Shanghai, China.

DuBose was ordered back to the Naval Academy at Annapolis in May 1929 and served as an instructor in the Department of Seamanship and Flight Tactics until June 1932, when he assumed command of destroyer USS Schenck operating with the Destroyer, Scouting Force in the Atlantic and the Caribbean. He completed his tour aboard Schenck in June 1934 and returned to the Naval Academy as an instructor in the Department of Economics and Government. DuBose was promoted to commander on April 1, 1934.

In July 1937, DuBose was ordered to the New York Navy Yard for duty in connection with fitting out of light cruiser USS Brooklyn and upon her commissioning on September 30, 1937, he assumed duty as her executive officer to ship's captain William W. Smith. He participated in her shakedown cruise to Guantanamo Bay, Cuba, and then in the patrols with Atlantic Fleet.

DuBose was ordered to the Naval War College in Newport, Rhode Island, in July 1939 and completed the Senior course one year later. He was promoted to captain on July 1, 1940, and remained on the staff of the college under Rear Admiral Edward C. Kalbfus.

== World War II ==
=== Guadalcanal ===
Following the United States entry into World War II, DuBose still served on the staff of the Naval War College, but requested combat assignment, which was ultimately granted and he immediately embarked for South Pacific. On May 16, 1942, he arrived to Tongatapu, Tonga and assumed command of heavy cruiser USS Portland, which was stationed there for repairs following the Battle of the Coral Sea.

The Portland then embarked as the part of admiral Frank J. Fletcher's Task Force 17 to intercept Japanese forces near Midway Atoll. During the ensuing battle there on June 4–7, 1942, Portland provided anti-aircraft defense for aircraft carrier USS Yorktown, which was struck several times with Japanese torpedoes and sunk. DuBose then commanded rescue operation of surviving Yorktown crew members and transported them aboard Portland to Pearl Harbor two days later.

DuBose then sailed for Aleutian Islands to counter a Japanese force there but were recalled to Pearl Harbor two days later. With the upcoming Guadalcanal campaign, Portland provided naval bombardment of Japanese positions during the amphibious landings at Tulagi and Guadalcanal from August 7–9, 1942 and then participated in the Battle of the Eastern Solomons. DuBose skilfully commanded Portland during latter battle and inflicted heavy damaged on Japanese air group without damage to his own ship. For his service during the battle, he was decorated with Navy Commendation Medal with Combat "V".

He took part in the Battle of the Santa Cruz Islands on October 25–27, 1942, where originally escorted aircraft carrier USS Enterprise. The Enterprise came under heavy air attack and Portland suffered her first wartime damage, when one of her 1.1-inch (28 mm) guns exploded in firing, also destroying several enemy aircraft. During the later stage of the battle, Portland's bridge lost control of steering, and before it could regain control, a Japanese submarine was spotted. The submarine struck Portland with three torpedoes, but none detonated, likely because the submarine had fired too close and they had no time to arm. DuBose was decorated with his first Navy Cross, the United States Navy second-highest decoration awarded for valor in combat.

In early November 1942, Japanese tried to retake Guadalcanal and sent there a troop and supply convoys escorted by aircraft carrier, two battleships, ten cruisers, and sixteen destroyers. The U.S. forces launched aircraft and warship attacks to prevent the Japanese to ground troops on Guadalcanal. DuBose and his Portland were attached to the Cruiser Division 3 under Rear Admiral Daniel J. Callaghan and steamed to Guadalcanal.

During the following battle, Portland was damaged by enemy torpedo causing heavy damage to her stern and subsequent blast disrupted her steering column, forcing her to steer in a circle. DuBose skillfully handled Portland, assisted in sinking of enemy destroyer Akatsuki and sunk another destroyer Yūdachi. After the steering problem was solved and Portland was able to withdraw on her own power to Tulagi. She was then towed to Sydney, Australia and escorted for preliminary repairs prior to overhaul in the United States. For his service on Guadalcanal, DuBose received his second Navy Cross and also Navy Unit Commendation.

=== Flag assignments ===
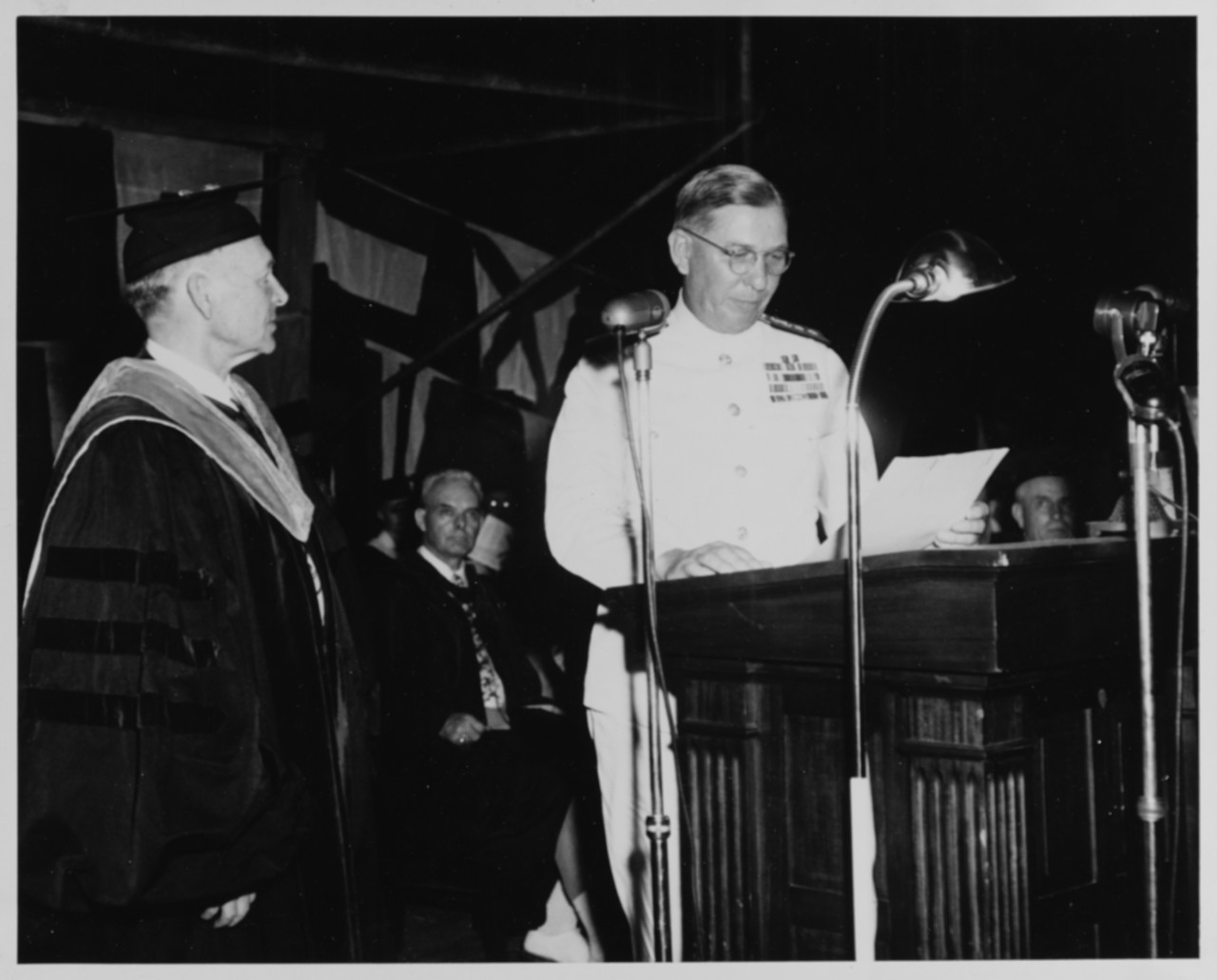
DuBose, Commandant of the 6th Naval District, reads the certificate given the University of South Carolina by the U.S. Navy for its outstanding training of men for the Naval service, June 1946.

DuBose was promoted to rear admiral in May 1943 and assumed command of newly established Cruiser Division 13 (CruDiv 13). His command consisted of cruisers USS Birmingham and USS Brooklyn (CL-40), where DuBose broke his flag (his flagship was the same vessel, where he once served back in 1937–1939). He led his command to the Mediterranean and held additional duty as commander of a fire support group during the Invasion of Sicily in July–August 1943. In addition to the supporting of landing, his cruisers destroyed many enemy shore defenses and DuBose received Legion of Merit with Combat "V".

The CruDiv 13 was subsequently transferred to the Pacific theater and reorganized, now comprising cruisers USS Birmingham (flagship), Santa Fe, USS Mobile and USS Biloxi. DuBose and his cruisers supported landings on Tarawa and Bougainville in late 1943 and then covered aircraft carriers during the strikes on Truk in February 1944 and received his second Legion of Merit.

During July and August 1944, DuBose and his division provided air cover for Fast Carrier Task Force during the strikes on Iwo Jima, where participated in destroying of Japanese airfield and intercepting of supply convoy north of Bonin Islands. Despite heavy fire from enemy shore batteries, DuBose and his cruisers bombarded the harbor and shipping at Chichijima and later directed the fleet planes attached to his cruisers in rescuing downed pilots and aircrewmen from carrier planes. He was decorated with third Legion of Merit for his service.

DuBose assumed additional duty as commander, Task Force 30.3.1 and his cruisers supported aircraft carriers during the air strikes against Formosa between October 12–14, 1944. He fought his group so skillfully that practically all the attacking airplanes were destroyed. DuBose then escorted the crippled cruisers USS Houston and USS Canberra out of the danger zone following the raids and for his service during that battle, he received his third Navy Cross.

He finished his service as commander, Cruiser Division 13 during the Invasion of Leyte, Philippines, in late October and early November 1944 and was relieved by Rear Admiral Morton L. Deyo. DuBose received his second Navy Commendation Medal and returned to the United States after consecutive 30 months of service at sea.

After brief leave with family, DuBose reported in the Navy Department in Washington, D.C., for duty as president of the Naval Examining Board with additional duty as a Senior Member of the Navy Department Board of Decorations and Medals. His main duty was to conduct the professional examinations of line officers, including warrant and chief warrant officers of the United States Navy for promotion; and for appointment, transfer, and promotion of the United States Naval Reserve.

In April 1945, DuBose was ordered to Europe and assumed duty as chief of staff and aide to the commander, Naval Forces Europe under Admiral Harold R. Stark with additional duty as Naval Attache at the American Embassy in London. He remained in that capacity until August that year and returned to the United States for duty as commandant, Sixth Naval district with headquarters at Charleston Navy Yard, South Carolina. While in this capacity, DuBose was responsible for the geographic areas of South Carolina, Georgia, and North Carolina.

== Postwar service ==
DuBose remained in that assignment until May 1948, when he was ordered to Hawaii for duty as commander, Battleships-Cruiser, Pacific Fleet. While in this capacity, he was responsible for all battleship divisions and destroyer squadrons within the Pacific Fleet; for the training of their crews and maintenance of that vessels, but was transferred to command of United States First Fleet in August that year. He operated his fleet in the western Pacific Ocean as the part of Pacific Fleet until March 1951, when he was transferred to Washington, D.C., for duty as Chief of Naval Personnel.

For his new assignment, DuBose was promoted to the rank of vice admiral on March 30, 1951. While in this capacity, he was subordinated directly to the Chief of Naval Operations, Admiral William Fechteler and thus assumed additional duty as Deputy Chief of Naval Operations for Personnel.

He was ordered for his final assignment in February 1953, when he assumed duty as commander, Eastern Sea Frontier with headquarters at Brooklyn Navy Yard, New York City. While at the Brooklyn Yard, DuBose held additional duty as commander, Atlantic Reserve Fleet. He was decorated by Italy for his service in these capacities.

== Retirement ==
DuBose retired from active duty on June 1, 1955, after 42 years of service and was advanced to the rank of admiral on the retired list for having been specially commended in combat.

Admiral Laurance T. DuBose died on July 11, 1967, aged 74, in Charleston, South Carolina, and was buried with full military honors at Arlington National Cemetery, Virginia. His wife, Gertrude Thompson DuBose, is buried with him.

== Awards and decorations ==
Here is the ribbon bar of Admiral DuBose:

1st Row	Navy Cross with two 5/16" Gold Stars		
2nd Row	Legion of Merit with two 5/16" Gold Stars and Combat "V"	Navy Commendation Medal with one 5/16" Gold Star and Combat "V"	Navy Unit Commendation
3rd Row	Mexican Service Medal	Haitian Campaign Medal	World War I Victory Medal with Fleet Clasp
4th Row	Yangtze Service Medal	American Defense Service Medal	American Campaign Medal
5th Row	European–African–Middle Eastern Campaign Medal with one bronze 3/16 inch service star	Asiatic–Pacific Campaign Medal with one three silver 3/16 inch service stars	World War II Victory Medal
6th Row	National Defense Service Medal	Order of Merit of the Italian Republic, Grand Officer	Philippine Liberation Medal with one star

Military offices
Preceded by Walter S. DeLany	Commander, Eastern Sea Frontier; February 1953 – June 1955	Succeeded by Arthur D. Struble
Preceded by John W. Roper	Chief of Naval Personnel; March 1951 – February 1953	Succeeded by James L. Holloway Jr.
Preceded by George D. Murray	Commander, United States First Fleet; August 1, 1948 – January 8, 1949	Succeeded by Gerald F. Bogan
Preceded by Jules James	Commandant, Sixth Naval district November 1, 1945 – May 18, 1948	Succeeded by Robert W. Hayler
Preceded by Command activated	Commander, Cruiser Division 13; May 1943 – November 1944	Succeeded by Morton L. Deyo
