= Daniel T. Oliver =

United States Navy officer (born 1945)

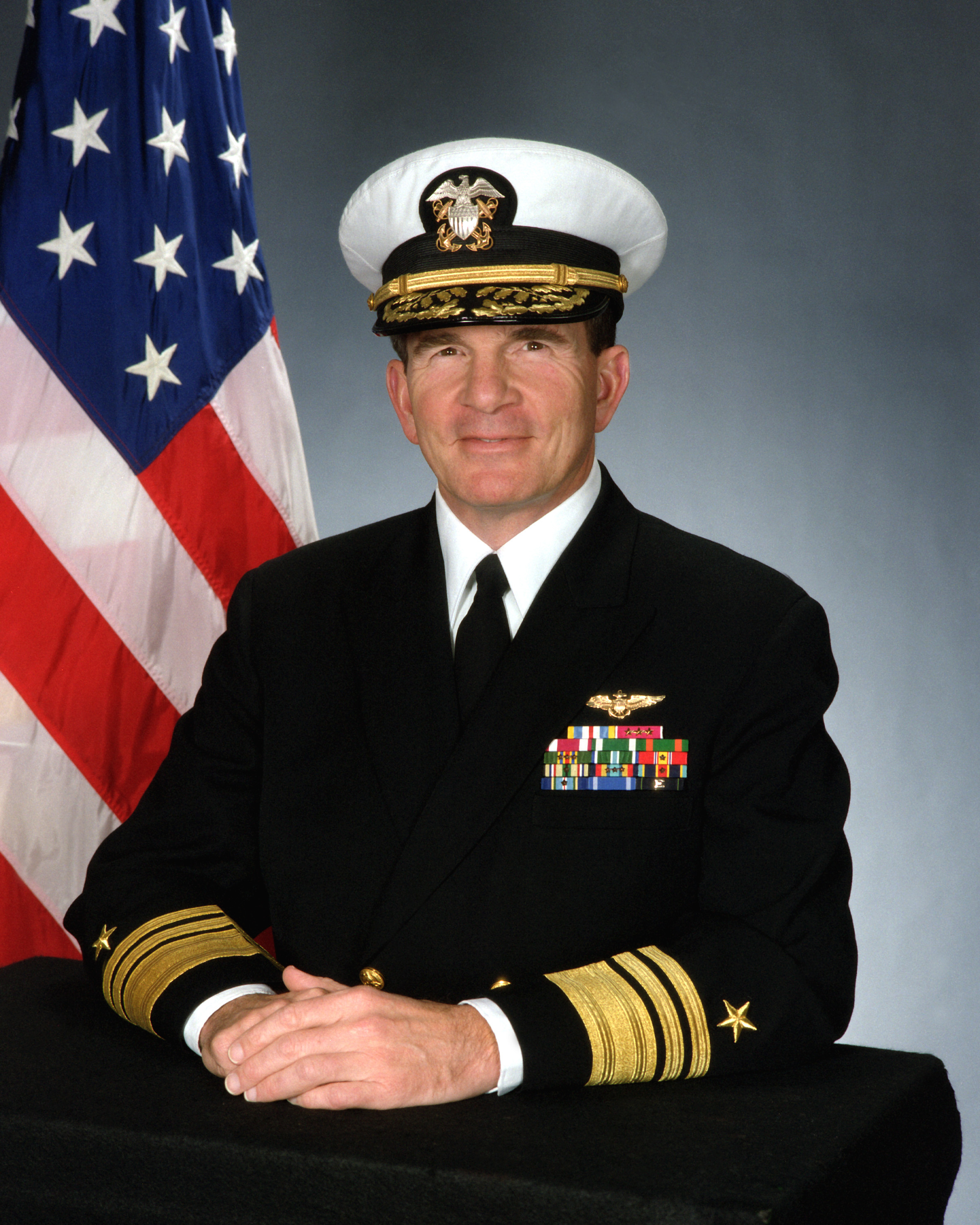
Vice Admiral Daniel T. Oliver in 1997

Vice Admiral Daniel Trantham Oliver (born 1945) was a United States Navy officer who rose to become Chief of Naval Personnel.

His early service included time with VP-10, VP-8, VP-30, and Commanding Officer of VP-16. He commanded Patrol Wing 2 at Naval Air Station Barbers Point, Hawaii, 1987–1989.

Admiral Oliver served during his career as Commander, NATO Maritime Air Forces Mediterranean and Commander, Fleet Air Mediterranean, c. 1991 – 1993.

He was director of several Navy Staff divisions 1993–95.

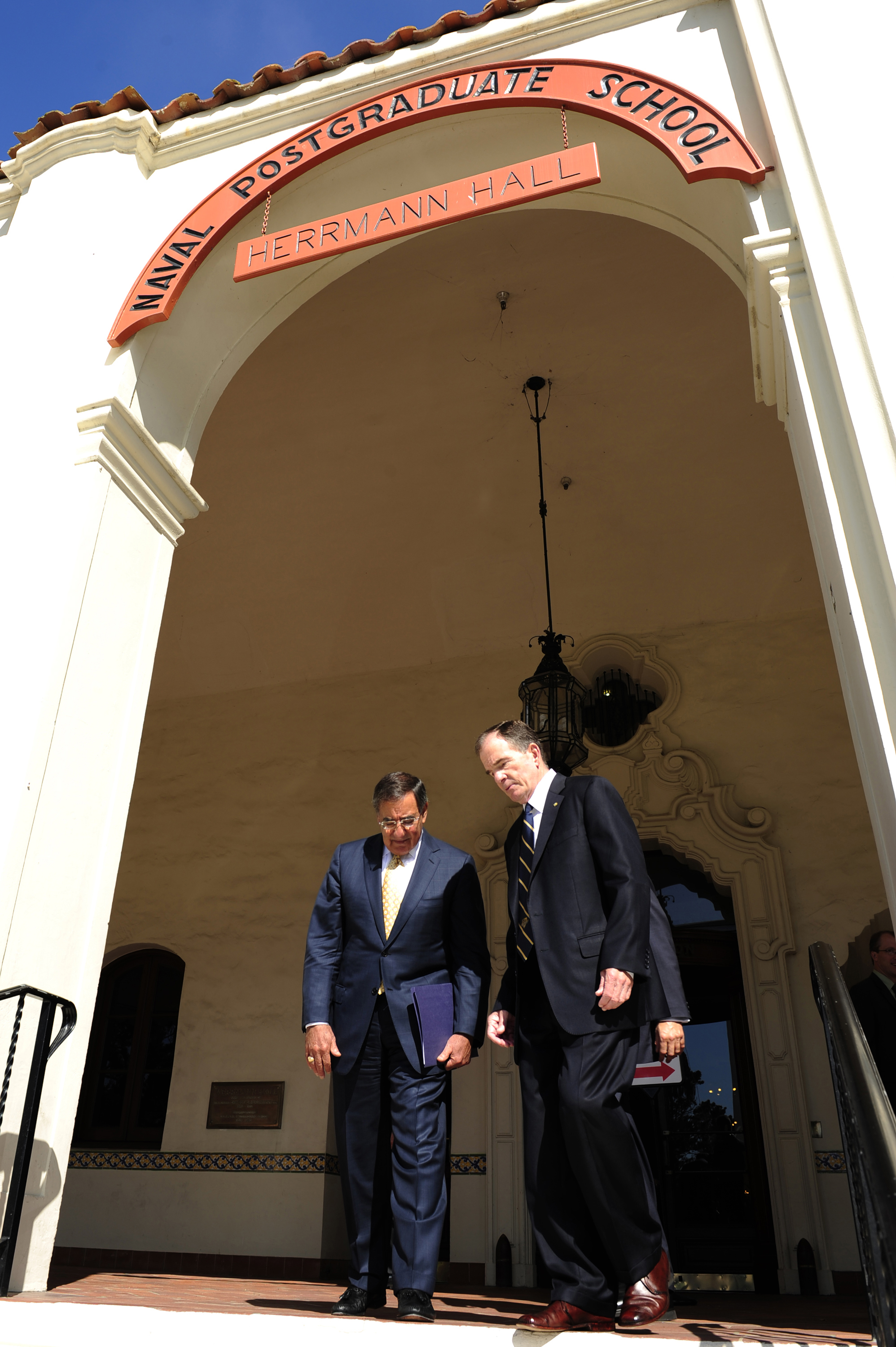
Secretary of Defense Leon Panetta and Dan Oliver at the Naval Postgraduate School in 2011

After his retirement, he was appointed to a post at the Naval Postgraduate School. But on November 27, 2012, Vice Admiral Oliver and Provost Dr. Leonard Ferrari were relieved of duty by Secretary of the Navy Ray Mabus. A Navy press release cited findings from a Naval Inspector General investigation which included Oliver's misuse of standard contracting procedures to circumvent federal hiring and compensation authorities. The investigation also found that both Oliver and Ferrari "inappropriately accepted gifts from an independent private foundation organized to support the school."

== Education ==
- M.Ed., Commerce, University of Virginia
- B.S., Commerce, University of Virginia
- Certificate, Advanced Management Program, Harvard Business School
