= Michelle Howard =

United States Navy admiral (born 1960)

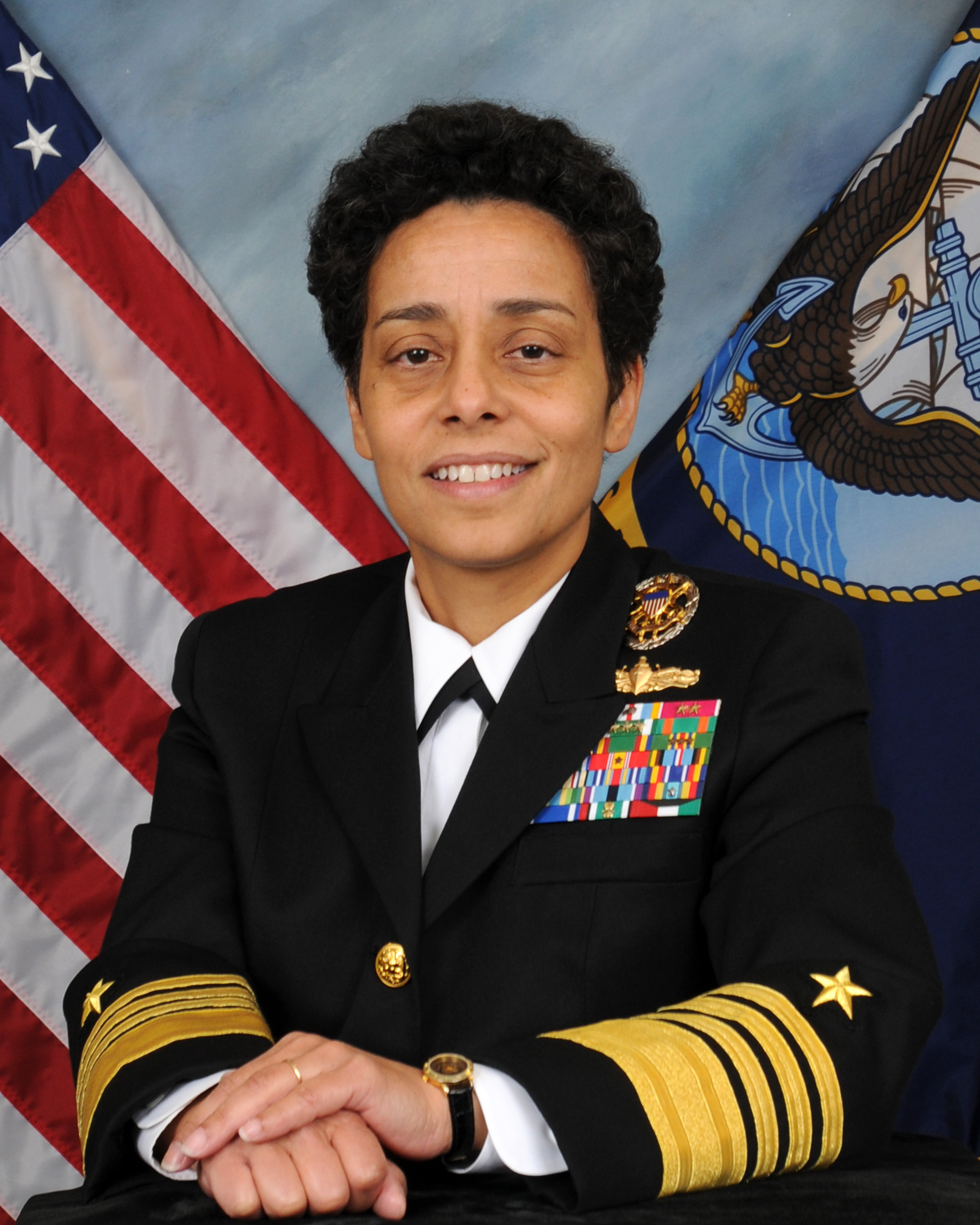
- Born: April 30, 1960 (age 66); March Air Force Base, California, U.S.
- Allegiance: United States
- Branch: United States Navy
- Service years: 1982–2017
- Rank: Admiral
- Commands: Vice Chief of Naval Operations; United States Naval Forces Europe - Naval Forces Africa; Allied Joint Force Command Naples; Combined Task Force 151; Expeditionary Strike Group Two; Amphibious Squadron 7 Task Force Two Zero; USS Rushmore
- Conflicts: Gulf War
- Awards: Defense Distinguished Service Medal; Navy Distinguished Service Medal (2); Defense Superior Service Medal (2); Legion of Merit (3); Meritorious Service Medal; Navy Commendation Medal (4); Navy Achievement Medal
- Spouse: Wayne Cowles

Michelle Janine Howard (born April 30, 1960) is a retired United States Navy four-star admiral who last served as the commander of the United States Naval Forces Europe, United States Naval Forces Africa and Allied Joint Force Command Naples. She previously was the 38th Vice Chief of Naval Operations. She assumed her last assignment on 7 June 2016.

Howard achieved many historical firsts throughout her naval career. She was the first African-American woman to command a United States Navy ship, USS Rushmore, and the first to achieve two- and three-star rank. In 2006, she was selected for the rank of rear admiral (lower half), making her the first admiral selected from the United States Naval Academy class of 1982 and the first female graduate of the United States Naval Academy selected for flag rank. On 1 July 2014, Howard was appointed Vice Chief of Naval Operations, the second highest-ranking officer in the Navy.

Upon her swearing in, Howard became the highest-ranking woman (until the swearing in of Lisa Franchetti) and first female four-star admiral in United States Naval history. Howard also became the first female four-star admiral to command operational forces, when she assumed command of United States Naval Forces Europe and Naval Forces Africa. Howard retired on 1 December 2017, after nearly 36 years of service in the United States Navy.

In 2021, Howard was appointed to The Naming Commission, a congressional commission created to rename U.S. military assets and locations with names associated with the Confederate States of America (CSA), and was sworn in as its chair in March.

== Early life and education ==
Howard was born at March Air Force Base in California, the daughter of United States Air Force master sergeant Nick Howard, and his wife, Phillipa. Howard is a 1978 graduate of Gateway High School in Aurora, Colorado. She graduated from the United States Naval Academy with a Bachelor of Science in 1982 and from the United States Army Command and General Staff College in 1998 with a Master of Military Art and Science.

== Naval career ==
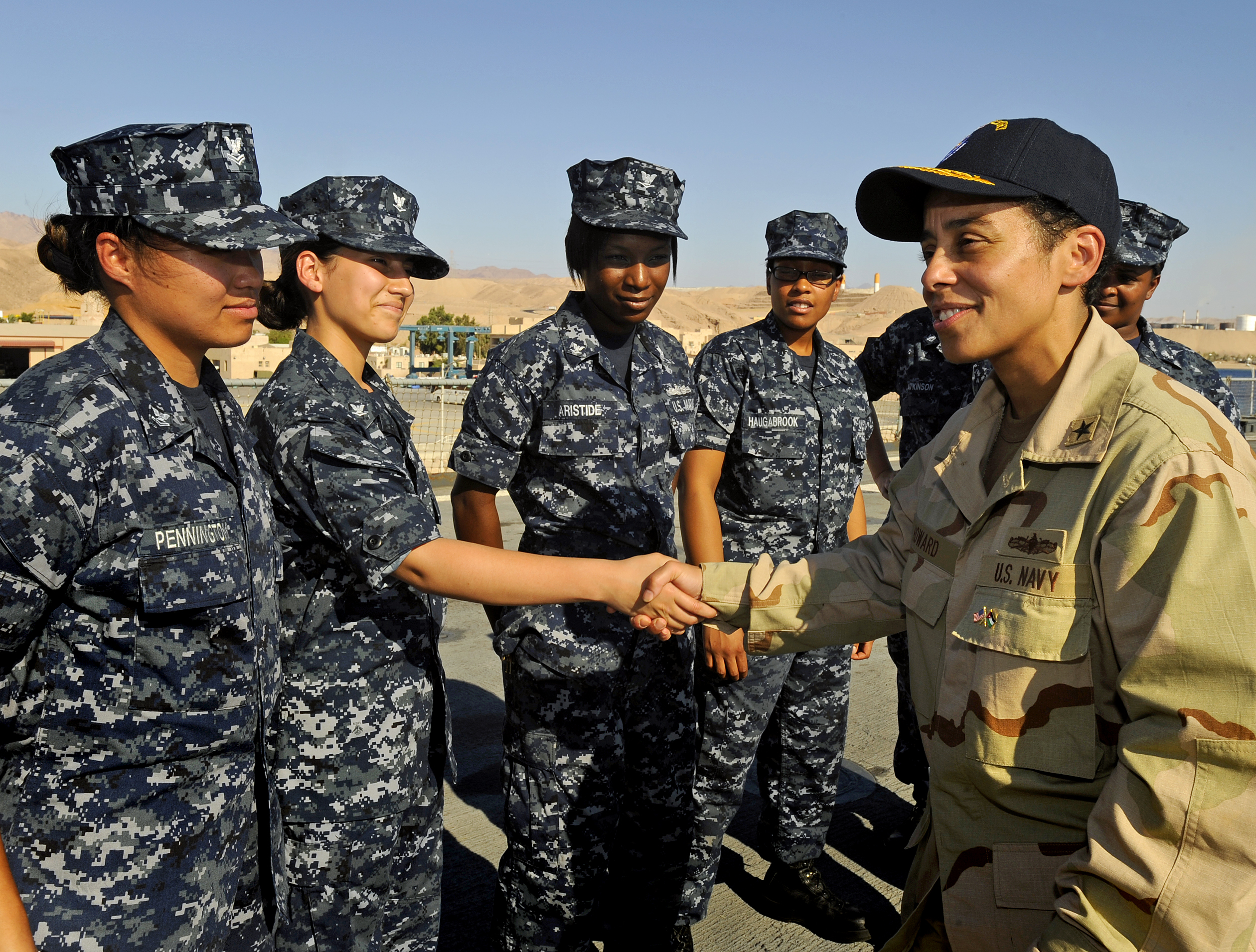
Howard meeting with U.S. Navy sailors aboard USS Fort McHenry in July 2009

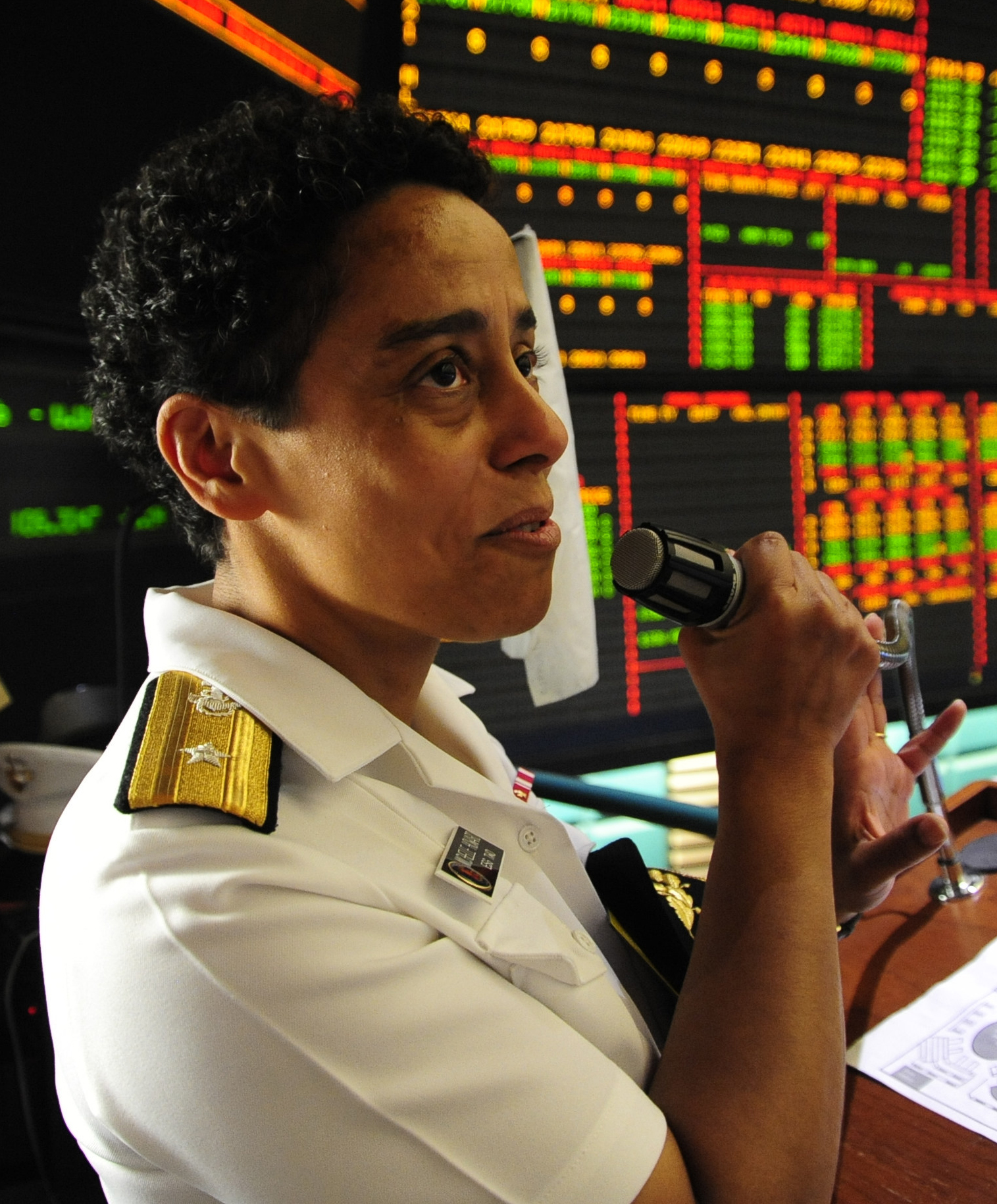
Howard gives a speech at the New York Mercantile Exchange in June 2010, during Fleet Week.

Howard's initial sea tours were aboard USS Hunley (AS 31) and USS Lexington (AVT 16). While serving on board USS Lexington, she received the Secretary of the Navy/Navy League Captain Winifred Collins award in May 1987. This award is given to one woman officer a year for outstanding leadership. She reported to USS Mount Hood (AE 29) as chief engineer in 1990 and served in the Gulf War, during Operations Desert Shield and Desert Storm. She assumed duties as First Lieutenant on board USS Flint (AE 32) in July 1992. In January 1996, she became the Executive Officer of USS Tortuga (LSD 46) and deployed to the Adriatic in support of Operation Joint Endeavor, a peacekeeping effort in the former Republic of Yugoslavia. Sixty days after returning from the Mediterranean deployment, Tortuga departed on a West African Training Cruise, where the ship's sailors, with embarked U.S. Marines and U.S. Coast Guard detachment, operated with the naval services of seven African nations.

Howard assumed command of USS Rushmore on 12 March 1999, becoming the first African-American woman to command a warship in the United States Navy. Howard commanded Amphibious Squadron 7 from May 2004 to September 2005. Deploying with Expeditionary Strike Group 5, operations included tsunami relief efforts in Indonesia and maritime security operations in the North Persian Gulf.

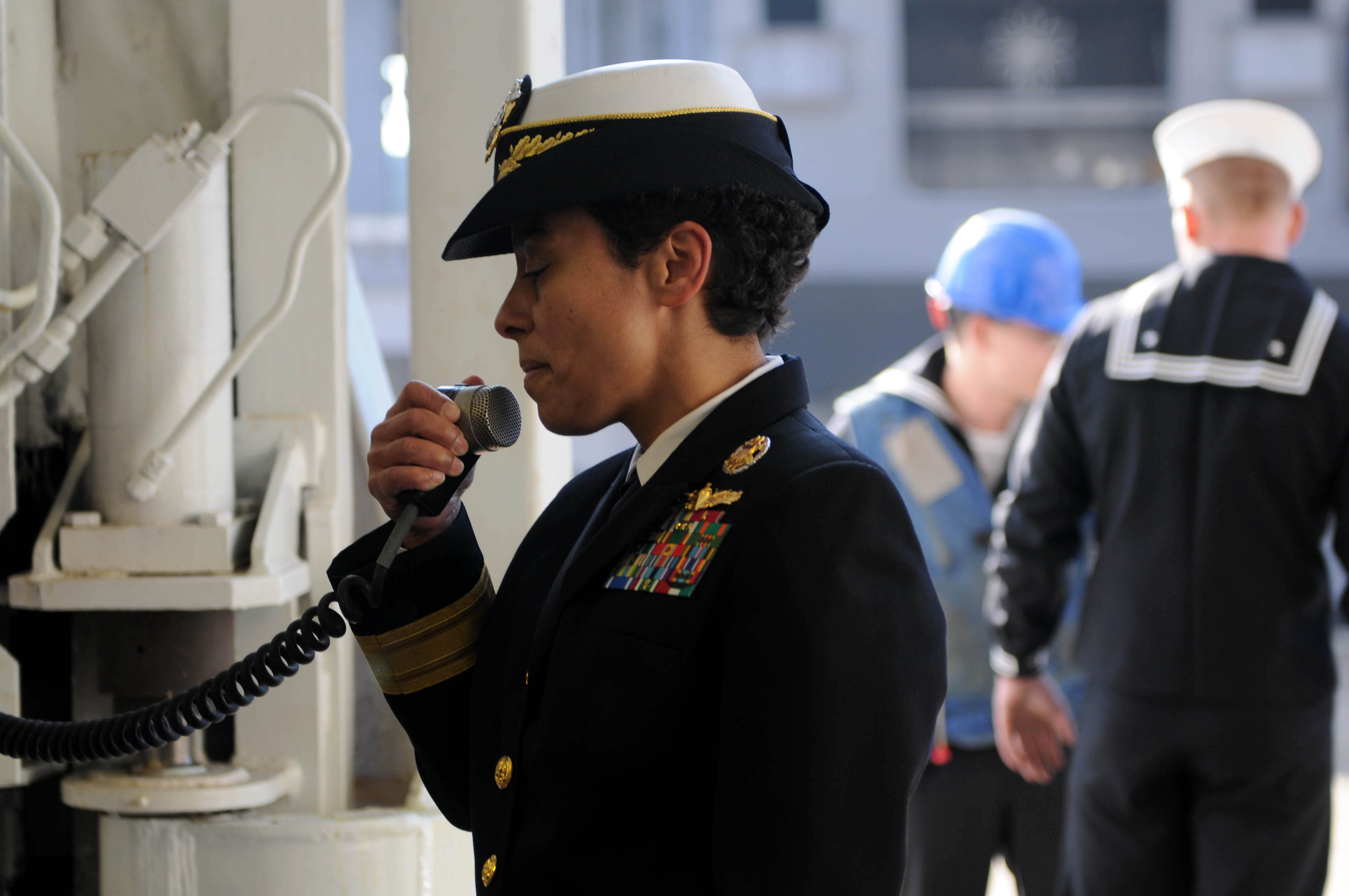
Howard addressing the crew of USS Wasp in December 2009

Howard's shore assignments include: Course Coordinator/Instructor for the Steam Engineering Officer of the Watch (EOOW) course; Action Officer and Navy's liaison to the Defense Advisory Committee on Women in the Military Services (DACOWITS) in the Bureau of Personnel; Action Officer J-3, Global Operations, Readiness on the Joint Staff from 2001 to 2003; Executive Assistant to the Joint Staff Director of Operations from February 2003 to February 2004; and Deputy Director N3 on the OPNAV Staff from December 2005 to July 2006.

Howard was the deputy director, Expeditionary Warfare Division, OPNAV staff from July 2006 to December 2006, and senior military assistant to the secretary of the Navy January 2007 – January 2009. She was chief of staff to the director for Strategic Plans and Policy, J-5, Joint Staff from August 2010 until July 2012. From August 2012 to July 2013 she was deputy commander, United States Fleet Forces Command headquartered in Norfolk, Virginia.

Howard assumed command of Expeditionary Strike Group 2 and Combined Task Force 151 (CTF 151) aboard the amphibious assault ship USS Boxer (LHD-4) in April 2009. Boxer was the flagship for CTF 151, a multinational task force established to conduct counter-piracy operations in the Indian Ocean. She played a key role in the rescue of Captain Richard Phillips, whose kidnapping by Somali pirates became a major motion picture film.

Howard was promoted to rear admiral (lower half), effective September 1, 2007 and to rear admiral, effective August 1, 2010. She was promoted to vice admiral on August 24, 2012.

On July 1, 2014, Howard was promoted to admiral. She became the 38th Vice Chief of Naval Operations the same day.

=== Dates of ranks ===
Promotions
| Rank | Date |
|---|---|
| Rear admiral (lower half) | September 1, 2007 |
| Rear admiral | August 1, 2010 |
| Vice admiral | August 24, 2012 |
| Admiral | July 1, 2014 |

== Career after retiring from the Navy ==
After Howard retired from the Navy on December 1, 2017, she became the J.B. and Maurice C. Shapiro Visiting Professor of International Affairs at George Washington University, teaching cybersecurity and international policy. IBM announced that it appointed Howard to its board, effective March 1, 2019.

In November 2020, Howard was named a volunteer member of the Joe Biden presidential transition Agency Review Team to support transition efforts related to the Defense Department. On February 12, 2021, Secretary of Defense Lloyd Austin appointed Howard as one of four Departmental representatives to the Commission on the Naming of Items of the Department of Defense that Commemorate the Confederate States of America or Any Person Who Served Voluntarily with the Confederate States of America. She was sworn in as the commission's chair on March 2, 2021.

== Awards and decorations ==

Joint Chiefs of Staff Badge
Surface Warfare Officer Pin
| Defense Distinguished Service Medal | | Navy Distinguished Service Medal w/ 1 gold award star |
| Defense Superior Service Medal w/ 1 bronze oak leaf cluster | Legion of Merit w/ 2 award stars | Meritorious Service Medal |
| Navy and Marine Corps Commendation Medal w/ 3 award stars | Navy and Marine Corps Achievement Medal | Joint Meritorious Unit Award w/ 2 oak leaf clusters |
| Navy Unit Commendation | Navy Meritorious Unit Commendation w/ 3 bronze service stars | Coast Guard Meritorious Unit Commendation with "O" device |
| National Defense Service Medal w/ 1 service star | Armed Forces Expeditionary Medal | Southwest Asia Service Medal w/ 1 service star |
| Global War on Terrorism Expeditionary Medal | Global War on Terrorism Service Medal | Armed Forces Service Medal |
| Humanitarian Service Medal | Navy Sea Service Deployment Ribbon w/ 1 silver service star | National Order of the Legion of Honour (Knight) (France) |
| NATO Medal for Former Yugoslavia | Kuwait Liberation Medal (Saudi Arabia) | Kuwait Liberation Medal (Kuwait) |
Command at Sea insignia
Allied Joint Force Command Naples

Howard is the recipient of the 2008 Women of Color Science Technology Engineering and Math (STEM) Career Achievement Award, 2009 Dominion Power Strong Men and Women Excellence in Leadership Award, and the 2011 USO Military Woman of the Year.

On February 1, 2013, Howard was honored with the "Chairman's Award" at the 44th NAACP Image Awards. She is a 1987 recipient of the Secretary of the Navy/Navy League Captain Winifred Collins Award.

On June 13, 2015, Howard was awarded the Doctor of Public Service honorary degree from the American Public University System for her many years of service in the United States Navy, her contribution to the advancement of women in the United States Military, and to her continued service to the people of the United States and around the world.

On May 22, 2021, Howard was the speaker for the commencement ceremonies at Fordham University, where she received an honorary doctorate of humane letters for her achievements and leadership in the U.S. armed forces .

She is an honorary member of Delta Sigma Theta sorority

== See also ==
- List of female United States military generals and flag officers

Military offices
| Preceded by David H. Buss | Deputy Commander of the United States Fleet Forces Command; 2012–2013 | Succeeded by Nora W. Tyson |
| Preceded by Mark I. Fox | Deputy Chief of Naval Operations for Operations, Plans, and Strategy; 2013–2014 | Succeeded by Kevin M. Donegan; Acting |
| Preceded by Mark E. Ferguson III | Vice Chief of Naval Operations; 2014–2016 | Succeeded by William F. Moran |
| Preceded by Mark E. Ferguson III | Commander of Allied Joint Force Command Naples; 2016–2017 | Succeeded by James G. Foggo III |
| Preceded by Mark E. Ferguson III | Commander of United States Naval Forces Europe - Naval Forces Africa; 2016–2017 | Succeeded by James G. Foggo III |
Political offices
| New office | Chair of The Naming Commission; 2021–present | Incumbent |
