= Richard Cheeseman Jr. =

U.S. Navy admiral

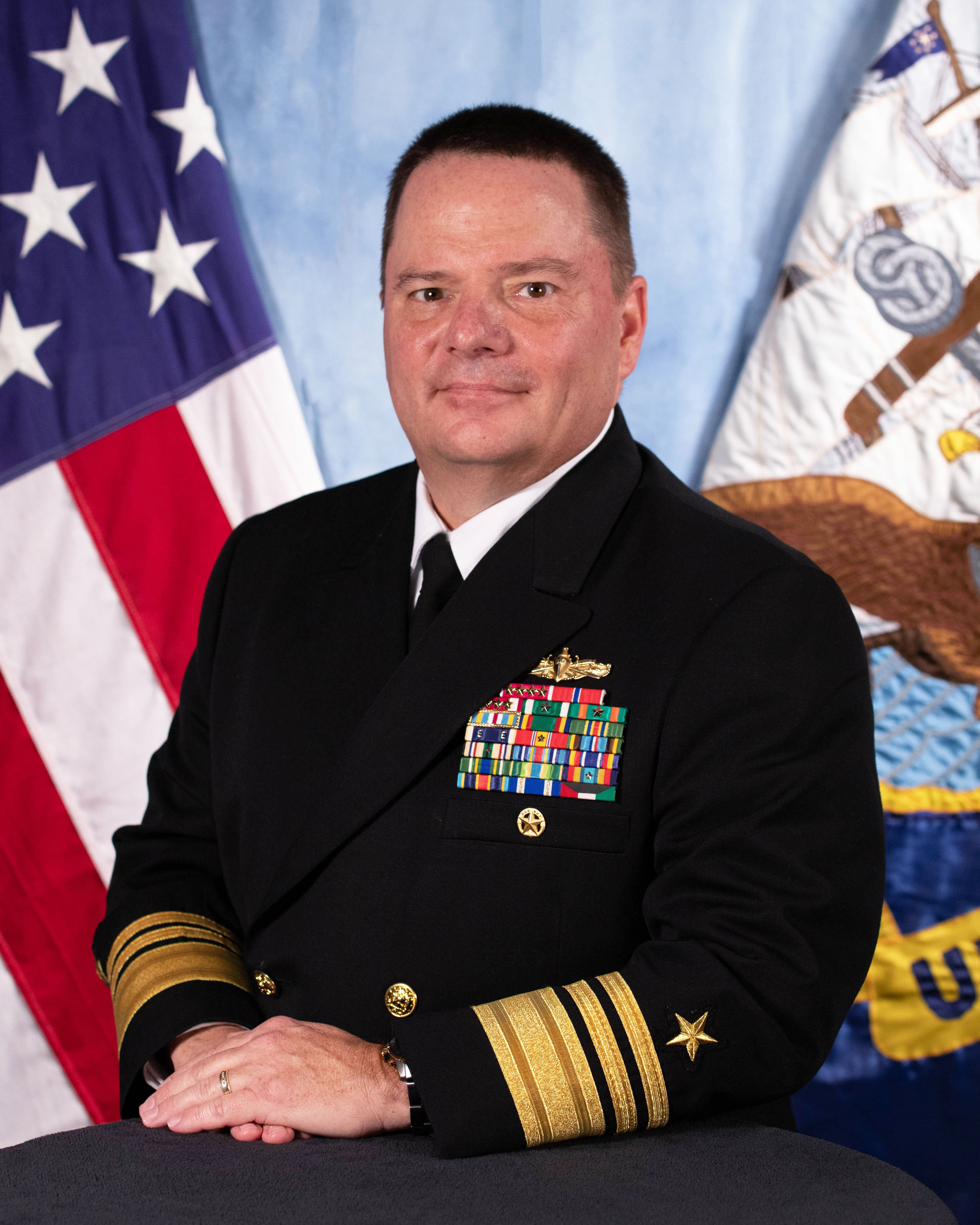
- Alma mater: Penn State University (BS); Joint Advanced Warfighting School
- Military career
- Allegiance: United States
- Branch: United States Navy
- Service years: 1989–2025
- Rank: Vice Admiral
- Nickname: Rick
- Commands: Chief of Naval Personnel; Carrier Strike Group 10; Carrier Strike Group 2; Naval Forces Korea Detachment Chinhae; USS Monterey (CG-61); USS Bulkeley (DDG-84)
- Conflicts: Gulf War
- Awards: Legion of Merit (5); Bronze Star Medal
- Cheeseman's voice Cheeseman's opening statement at a House Armed Services Military Personnel Subcommittee hearing on the 2023 military personnel posture Recorded March 29, 2023

Richard John Cheeseman Jr. is a retired United States Navy vice admiral and surface warfare officer who last served as the deputy chief of naval operations for personnel, manpower, and training and 60th Chief of Naval Personnel from 2022 to 2025. He previously served as a special education assistant to the Commander, United States Fleet Forces Command, and prior to that was commander of Carrier Strike Group 10 from 2020 to 2022. He has also commanded Carrier Strike Group 2 with tours as commanding officer of the USS Bulkeley (DDG-84) and USS Monterey (CG-61).

Raised in Carneys Point Township, New Jersey, Cheeseman earned a Bachelor of Science degree from Pennsylvania State University in 1989. He later received a master's degree in joint campaign planning and strategy from the Joint Advanced Warfighting School at the Joint Forces Staff College in 2007.

== Awards and decorations ==

Surface Warfare Officer Pin
Legion of Merit with four award stars		Bronze Star Medal
Meritorious Service Medal with three award stars	Navy and Marine Corps Commendation Medal with award star	Navy and Marine Corps Achievement Medal with award star
Joint Meritorious Unit Commendation	Navy Unit Commendation with bronze service star	Navy Meritorious Unit Commendation
Navy "E" Ribbon, 2nd award	National Defense Service Medal with bronze service star	Armed Forces Expeditionary Medal
Southwest Asia Service Medal with bronze service star	Global War on Terrorism Expeditionary Medal	Global War on Terrorism Service Medal
Korea Defense Service Medal	Armed Forces Service Medal	Navy Sea Service Deployment Ribbon with silver service star
Navy and Marine Corps Overseas Service Ribbon	NATO Medal Ribbon (non-Article 5 version)	Kuwait Liberation Medal (Kuwait)
Command at Sea insignia

Military offices
Preceded by John T. Beaver Jr.	Commanding Officer of USS Bulkeley (DDG-84); 2007–2009	Succeeded by Christopher P. DeGregory
Preceded by Thomas K. Kiss	Commanding Officer of USS Monterey (CG-61); 2013–2015	Succeeded by Christopher P. DeGregory
Preceded by Sara A. Joyner	Commander of Carrier Strike Group 2; 2020	Succeeded by Scott Robertson
Preceded by Brendan McLane	Commander of Carrier Strike Group 10; 2020–2022	Succeeded by Dennis Velez
Preceded by John B. Nowell Jr.	Chief of Naval Personnel; 2022–2025	Succeeded by M. Wayne Baze; Acting
