= Vice Chief of Naval Operations =

Second highest-ranking officer in the U.S. Navy

- Mark of the U.S. Navy

- Flag of the vice chief of naval operations

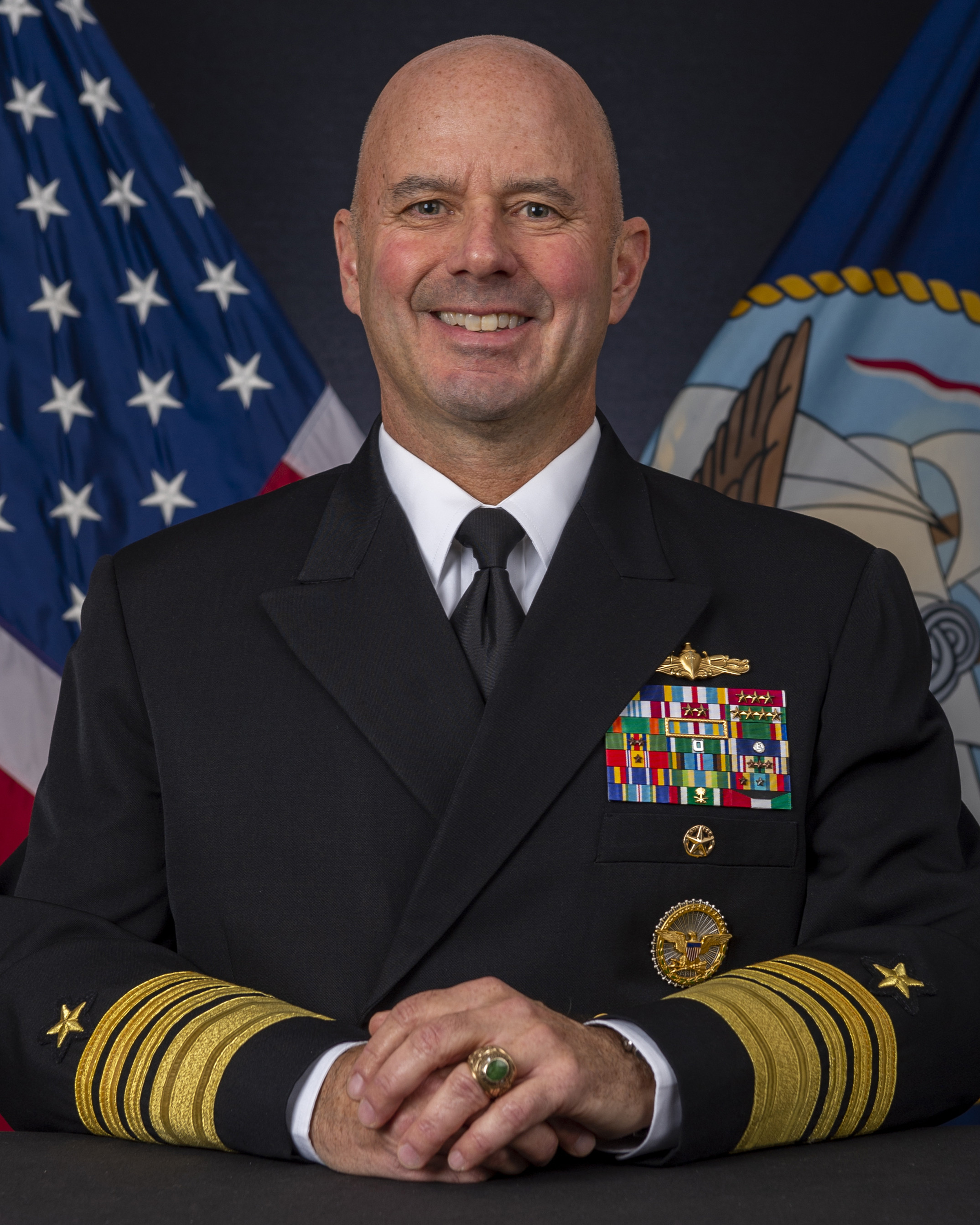
- Incumbent; Admiral James W. Kilby since 5 January 2024
- United States Navy; Office of the Chief of Naval Operations
- Abbreviation: VCNO
- Reports to: Chief of Naval Operations
- Appointer: The president with Senate advice and consent
- Constituting instrument: 10 U.S.C. § 8035
- Formation: 26 March 1942; 84 years ago
- First holder: Frederick J. Horne

The vice chief of naval operations (VCNO) is the second highest-ranking commissioned United States Navy officer and functions as the principal deputy of the chief of naval operations. By statute, the vice chief is appointed as a four-star admiral.

== Role ==
The senior leadership of the U.S. Department of the Navy consists of two civilians, the secretary of the Navy (SECNAV) and the under secretary of the Navy (USECNAV), as well as the four senior commissioned officers on the two military service staffs: Office of the Chief of Naval Operations (OPNAV) and Headquarters Marine Corps (HQMC).

The vice chief is the principal deputy of the chief of Naval operations (CNO). The vice chief may also perform other delegated duties that either the secretary of the Navy or the CNO assigns to him or her. If the CNO is absent or is unable to perform their duties, then the vice chief assumes the duties and responsibilities of the CNO. Within the Office of the Chief of Naval Operations, while there are several Deputy Chiefs of Naval Operations (DCNOs) of either three or two star rank, there is only one VCNO.

The vice chief is appointed by the president of the United States, and must be confirmed via majority vote by the Senate. While there is not a fixed term nor a term limit in the statute; the historical precedent is that a vice chief of naval operations serves for a tenure of two to three years.

== Historical background ==
The equivalent of the current VCNO position was called Assistant for Operations in 1915, and Assistant Chief of Naval Operations in 1922. In 1942 the title became Vice Chief of Naval Operations.

== List of vice chiefs of naval operations ==
No.	Image	Name	Tenure		Post(s) held after VCNO tenure
No.	Image	Name	Began	Ended	Post(s) held after VCNO tenure
1		VADM (ADM) Frederick J. Horne	26 March 1942	2 September 1945	Retired, 1945; Promoted to admiral on 29 January 1945
2		ADM Richard S. Edwards Jr.	1945	1946	Commander, Western Sea Frontier (1946–1947); Commander, Pacific Reserve Fleet (1946–1947); Retired, 1947
3		ADM DeWitt Clinton Ramsey	15 January 1946	3 January 1948	Commander in Chief, U.S. Pacific Command (1948–1949); Commander in Chief, U.S. Pacific Fleet (1948–1949; High Commissioner, Trust Territory of the Pacific Islands (1948–1949); Retired, 1949
4		VADM Arthur W. Radford	January 1948	May 1949	Commander in Chief, U.S. Pacific Command (1949–1953); Commander in Chief, U.S. Pacific Fleet (1949–1953); High Commissioner, Trust Territory of the Pacific Islands (1949–1951); Chairman of the Joint Chiefs of Staff (1953–1957); Retired, 1957
5		VADM John D. Price	1949	1950	Retired, 1950; Promoted to admiral upon retirement
6		ADM Lynde D. McCormick	1950	1951	Commander in Chief, U.S. Atlantic Command (1951–1954); Commander in Chief, U.S. Atlantic Fleet (1951–1954); Supreme Allied Commander Atlantic (1952–1954); Retired, 1954
7		ADM Donald B. Duncan	1951	1956	Retired, 1956
8		ADM Harry D. Felt	1956	1958	Commander in Chief, U.S. Pacific Command (1958–1964); Retired, 1964
9		ADM James S. Russell	21 July 1958	September 1961	Commander in Chief, Allied Forces Southern Europe (1961–1965); Retired, 1965
10		ADM Claude V. Ricketts	25 September 1961	6 July 1964	Died in office, 1964
11		ADM Horacio Rivero, Jr.	July 1964	January 1968	Commander in Chief, Allied Forces Southern Europe (1968–1972); Retired, 1972
12		ADM Bernard A. Clarey		December 1970	Commander in Chief, U.S. Pacific Fleet (1970–1973); Retired 1973
13		ADM Ralph W. Cousins	1970	1972	Supreme Allied Commander Atlantic (1972–1975); Commander in Chief, U.S. Atlantic Command (1972–1975); Commander in Chief, U.S. Atlantic Fleet (1972–1975); Retired, 1975
14		ADM Maurice F. Weisner	1972	1973	Commander in Chief, U.S. Pacific Fleet (1973–1976); Commander in Chief, U.S. Pacific Command (1976–1979); Retired, 1979
15		ADM James L. Holloway III	September 1973	1974	Chief of Naval Operations (1974–1978); Retired, 1978
16		ADM Worth H. Bagley	June 1974	July 1975	Retired, 1975
17		ADM Harold E. Shear	1975	1977	Commander in Chief, Allied Forces Southern Europe (1978–1980); Retired, 1980; Administrator of the Maritime Administration (1981–1985)
18		ADM Robert L. J. Long	July 1977	April 1979	Commander in Chief, U.S. Pacific Command (1979–1983); Retired, 1983
19		ADM James D. Watkins	April 1979	1981	Commander in Chief, U.S. Pacific Fleet (1981–1982); Chief of Naval Operations (1982–1986); Retired, 1986; Secretary of Energy (1989–1993)
20		ADM William N. Small	1981	1983	Commander in Chief, U.S. Naval Forces Europe (1983–1985); Commander in Chief, Allied Forces Southern Europe (1983–1985); Retired, 1985
21		ADM Ronald J. Hays	1983	1985	Commander in Chief, U.S. Pacific Command (1985–1988); Retired, 1988
22		ADM James B. Busey IV	September 1985	March 1987	Commander in Chief, U.S. Naval Forces Europe (1987–1989); Commander in Chief, Allied Forces Southern Europe (1987–1989); Retired, 1989; Administrator of the Federal Aviation Administration (1989–1991); Deputy Secretary of Transportation (1991–1992)
23		ADM Huntington Hardisty	March 1987	1988	Commander in Chief, U.S. Pacific Command (1988–1991); Retired, 1991
24		ADM Leon A. Edney	August 1988	May 1990	Supreme Allied Commander Atlantic (1990–1992); Commander in Chief, U.S. Atlantic Command (1990–1992); Retired, 1992
25		ADM Jerome L. Johnson	May 1990	July 1992	Retired, 1992
26		ADM Stanley R. Arthur	6 July 1992	1995	Retired, 1995
27		ADM Joseph W. Prueher	April 1995	1996	Commander in Chief, U.S. Pacific Command (1996–1999); Retired, 1999; U.S. Ambassador to China (1999–2001).
28		ADM Jay L. Johnson	April 1996	August 1996	Chief of Naval Operations (1996–2000); Retired, 2000
29		ADM Harold W. Gehman, Jr.	September 1996	September 1997	Supreme Allied Commander Atlantic (1997–2000); Commander in Chief, U.S. Atlantic Command (1997–1999); Commander in Chief, U.S. Joint Forces Command (1999–2000); Retired, 2000
30		ADM Donald L. Pilling	October 1997	October 2000	Retired, 2000
31		ADM William J. Fallon	October 2000	August 2003	Commander, Fleet Forces Command/U.S. Atlantic Fleet (2003–2005); Commander, U.S. Pacific Command (2005–2007); Commander, U.S. Central Command (2007–2008); Retired, 2008
32		ADM Michael G. Mullen	August 2003	August 2004	Commander, U.S. Naval Forces Europe (2004–2005); Commander, Allied Joint Force Command Naples (2004–2005); Chief of Naval Operations (2005–2007); Chairman of the Joint Chiefs of Staff (2007–2011); Retired, 2011
33		ADM John B. Nathman	August 2004	February 2005	Commander, U.S. Fleet Forces Command (2005–2007); Retired, 2007
34		ADM Robert F. Willard	18 March 2005	5 April 2007	Commander, U.S. Pacific Fleet (2007–2009); Commander, U.S. Pacific Command (2009–2012); Retired, 2012
35		ADM Patrick M. Walsh	5 April 2007	13 August 2009	Commander, U.S. Pacific Fleet (2009–2012); Retired, 2012
36		ADM Jonathan W. Greenert	13 August 2009	22 August 2011	Chief of Naval Operations (2011–2015); Retired, 2015
37		ADM Mark E. Ferguson III	22 August 2011	1 July 2014	Commander, U.S. Naval Forces Europe (2014–2016); Commander, U.S. Naval Forces Africa (2014–2016); Commander, Allied Joint Force Command Naples (2014–2016); Retired, 2016
38		ADM Michelle J. Howard	1 July 2014	31 May 2016	Commander, U.S. Naval Forces Europe (2016–2017); Commander, U.S. Naval Forces Africa (2016–2017); Commander, Allied Joint Force Command Naples (2016–2017); Retired, 2017
39		ADM William F. Moran	31 May 2016	10 June 2019	Retired, 2019
40		ADM Robert P. Burke	10 June 2019	29 May 2020	Commander, United States Naval Forces Europe-Africa (2020–2022); Commander, Allied Joint Force Command Naples (2020–2022); Retired, 2022
41		ADM William K. Lescher	29 May 2020	2 September 2022	Retired, 2022
42		ADM Lisa M. Franchetti	2 September 2022	2 November 2023	Chief of Naval Operations (2023–2025)
43		ADM James W. Kilby	5 January 2024	Incumbent	

== See also ==
- Under Secretary of the Navy
- Master Chief Petty Officer of the Navy
- Vice Chief of Staff of the Army (U.S. Army counterpart)
- Assistant Commandant of the Marine Corps (U.S. Marine Corps counterpart)
- Vice Chief of Staff of the Air Force (U.S. Air Force counterpart)
- Vice Chief of Space Operations (U.S. Space Force counterpart)
- Vice Commandant of the Coast Guard (U.S. Coast Guard counterpart)
