= Admiral Bagley =

Admiral Bagley may refer to:

- David H. Bagley (1920–1992), U.S. Navy admiral
- David W. Bagley (1883–1960), U.S. Navy admiral
- Worth H. Bagley (1924–2016), U.S. Navy admiral
