= David Bagley =

David Bagley may refer to:

- David W. Bagley (1883–1960), admiral in the U.S. Navy
- David H. Bagley (1920–1992), his son, admiral in the U.S. Navy
