= Addie Worth Bagley Daniels =

American suffragist, socialite, and writer

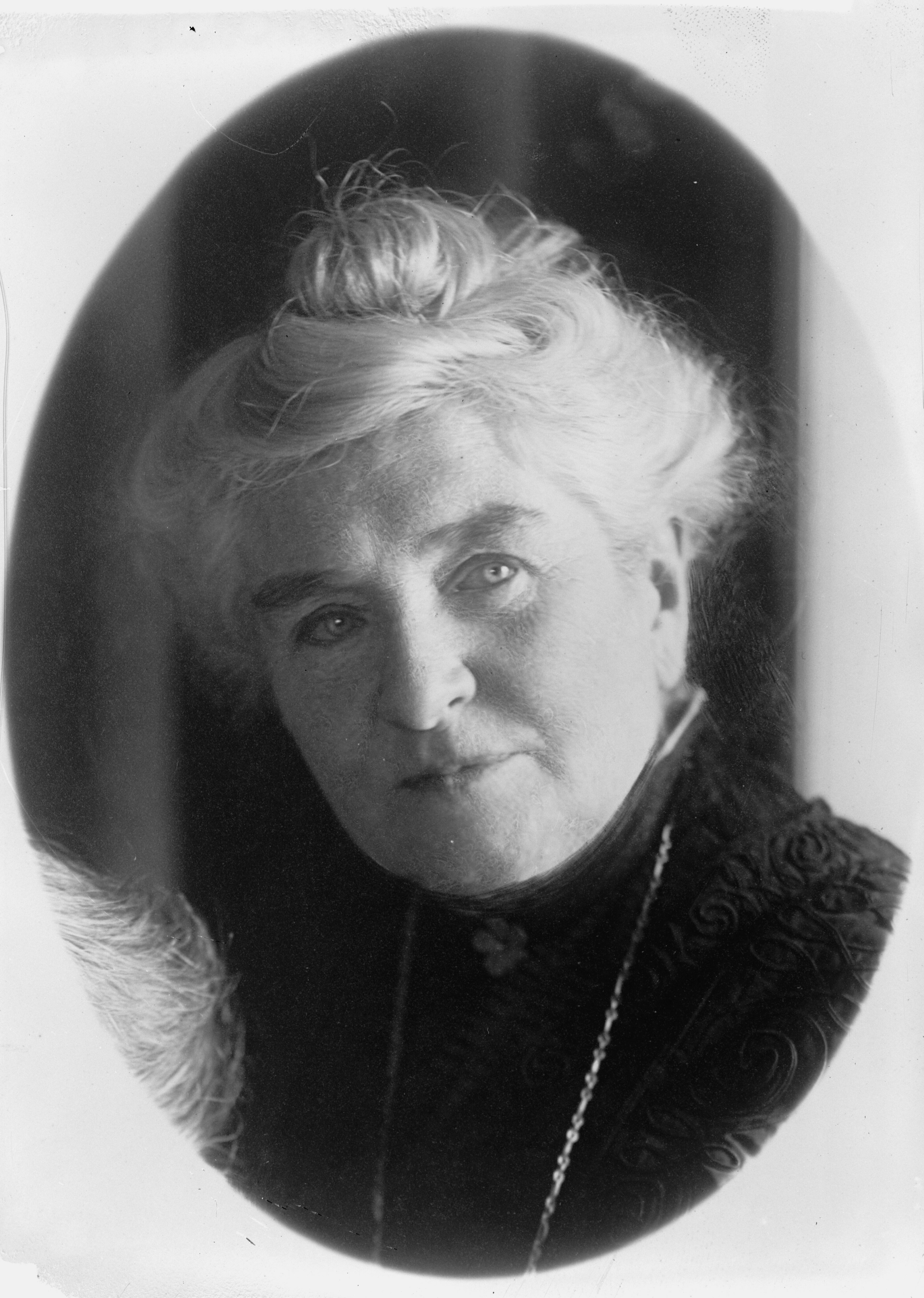
- Born: Adelaide Worth Bagley; May 1, 1869; Raleigh, North Carolina, U.S.
- Died: December 19, 1943 (aged 74); Raleigh, North Carolina, U.S.
- Education: Peace Institute
- Occupations: socialite, suffragist, writer
- Political party: Democratic
- Spouse: Josephus Daniels
- Children: 4, including Jonathan W. Daniels
- Parent(s): William Henry Bagley (father); Adelaide Ann Worth (mother)
- Relatives: David W. Bagley (brother); Worth Bagley (brother); Jonathan Worth (grandfather); Martitia Daniel (grandmother)

Adelaide Worth Bagley Daniels (May 1, 1869 – December 19, 1943) was an American suffragist, socialite, and writer. In 1920, she was appointed by President Woodrow Wilson as the United States delegate to the Eighth Conference of the International Woman Suffrage Alliance and served as the honorary president of the North Carolina Equal Suffrage League. Daniels was the first woman trustee of the Peace Institute and one of the first women trustees of Rex Hospital.

== Early life and family ==
Adelaide Worth Bagley was born on May 1, 1869, in Raleigh, North Carolina to Major William Henry Bagley and Adelaide Ann Worth. Her father was a Confederate States Army officer who went on to serve as a clerk of the North Carolina Supreme Court, superintendent of the United States Mint, and as a state senator. Her mother was the daughter of Governor Jonathan Worth and First Lady Martitia Daniel Worth. Addie was the sister of Worth Bagley and David W. Bagley.

She attended the Peace Institute, a women's college in Raleigh.

== Adult life ==
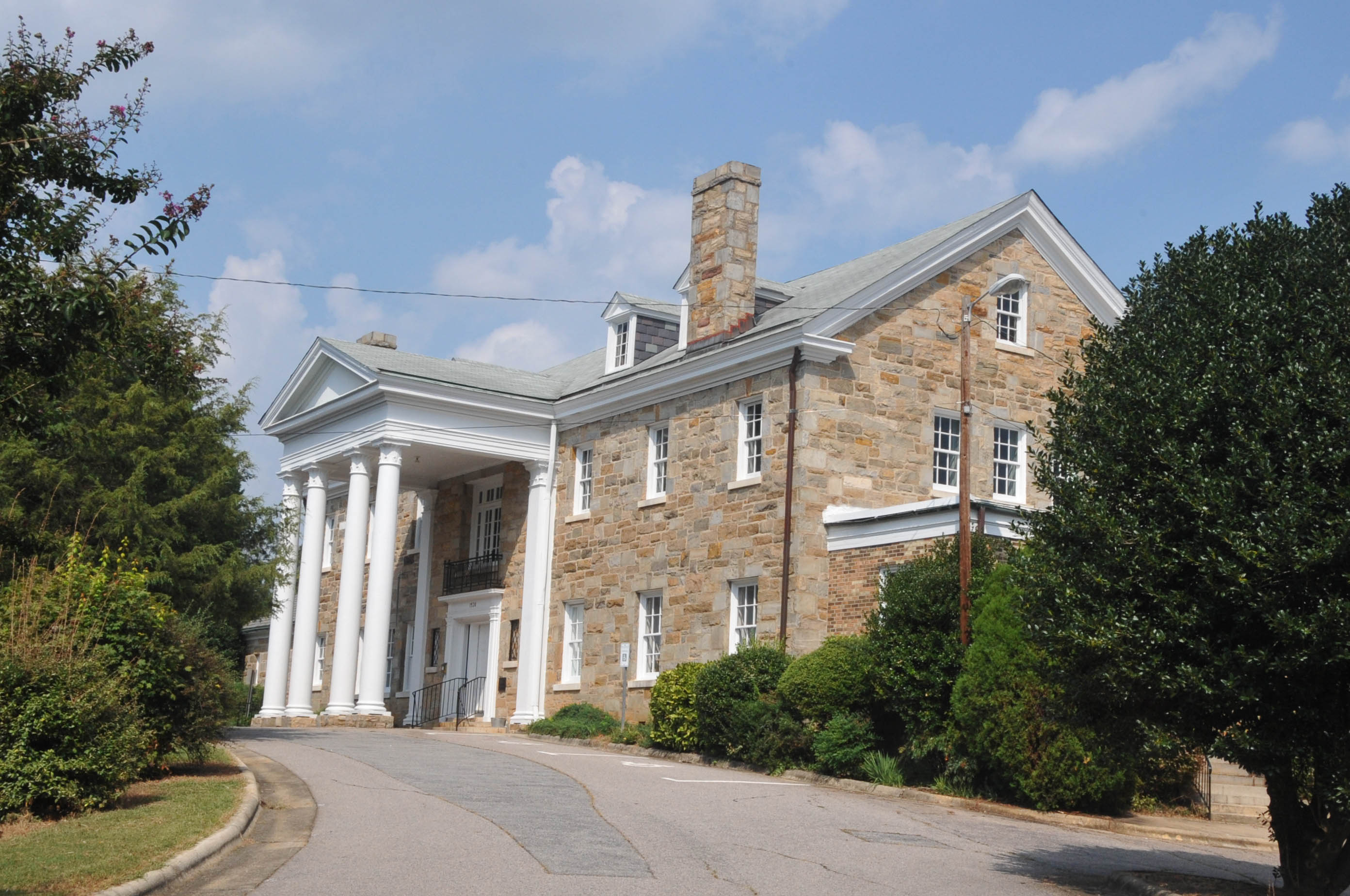
Josephus Daniels House, Raleigh, North Carolina

She married Josephus Daniels, a newspaper man and leading proponent of the Ku Klux Klan who was a perpetrator of the Wilmington massacre in 1898, a mob of thousands of white supremacists who overthrow an elected government in Wilmington, North Carolina, and expelled black residents and political leaders from the city. Her husband also served as United States Secretary of the Navy under President Woodrow Wilson and as the Ambassador to Mexico during the presidency of Franklin D. Roosevelt. Their son, Jonathan W. Daniels, served as White House Press Secretary.

Daniels was a prominent socialite and hostess in Raleigh. In January 1913, she hosted a luncheon for North Carolina First Lady Annie Burgin Craig to introduce her to the members of the North Carolina General Assembly and their wives. She served as president of the Raleigh Women's Club and was an active member of the Colonial Dames of America, the Daughters of the American Revolution, and the United Daughters of the Confederacy. Daniels helped establish the YMCA in Raleigh and served as the first woman trustee of the Peace Institute and one of the first women trustees of Rex Hospital.

She aligned with the Democrat party and was dedicated to the women's suffrage movement. She attended the Eighth Conference of the International Woman Suffrage Alliance in 1920 as the United States delegate, appointed by President Woodrow Wilson upon the recommendation of Carrie Chapman Catt. Later that year, she served as the honorary president of the North Carolina Equal Suffrage League. She campaigned for the ratification of the Nineteenth Amendment to the United States Constitution and authored The Justice, Expediency and Inevitableness of Ratification for Everywoman's Magazine.

In 1940, she was presented an honorary doctor of laws from the Women's College of University of North Carolina, becoming the second woman to receive an honorary degree from the college.

Bagley Daniels speaking in 1914.

== Death and legacy ==
Daniels died in Raleigh in 1943. The following year, the government commissioned the SS Addie B. Daniels.

== Selected works ==
- 1920, "The Justice, Expediency and Inevitableness of Ratification", Everywoman's Magazine
- 1945, Recollections of a Cabinet Minister's Wife 1913-1921

== Bibliography ==
- Daniels, Lucy (29 November 2001). With A Woman's Voice: A Writer's Struggle for Emotional Freedom. Madison Books. ISBN 978-1-4617-1398-2.
- Lacey, Theresa Jensen (1 October 2002). Amazing North Carolina. Harper Collins. ISBN 978-1-4185-3840-8.
- Ritzenhoff, Karen A.; Hermes, Katherine A. (14 January 2009). Sex and Sexuality in a Feminist World. Cambridge Scholars Publishing. ISBN 978-1-4438-0426-4.
- Voris, Jacqueline Van (1996). Carrie Chapman Catt: A Public Life. Feminist Press at CUNY. ISBN 978-1-55861-139-9.
