= Meyerkord =

Meyerkord may refer to:

- Harold Dale Meyerkord (1937-1965), a United States Navy officer and Navy Cross recipient
- USS Meyerkord (FF-1058), a United States Navy frigate in commission from 1969 to 1991
