= USS Bagley =

Four ships of the United States Navy have borne the name Bagley. The first three were named after Ensign Worth Bagley. The fourth, FF‑1069, honors both Worth Bagley and his brother, Admiral David W. Bagley.

- USS Bagley (TB-24), was a torpedo boat launched in 1900 and decommissioned in 1919.
- USS Bagley (DD-185), was a Wickes-class destroyer, launched in 1918 and then transferred to the Royal Navy.
- USS Bagley (DD-386), was the lead destroyer of her class, launched in 1936 and decommissioned in 1946.
- USS Bagley (FF-1069), was a Knox-class frigate, launched in 1971 and decommissioned in 1992.
