= Worth H. Bagley =

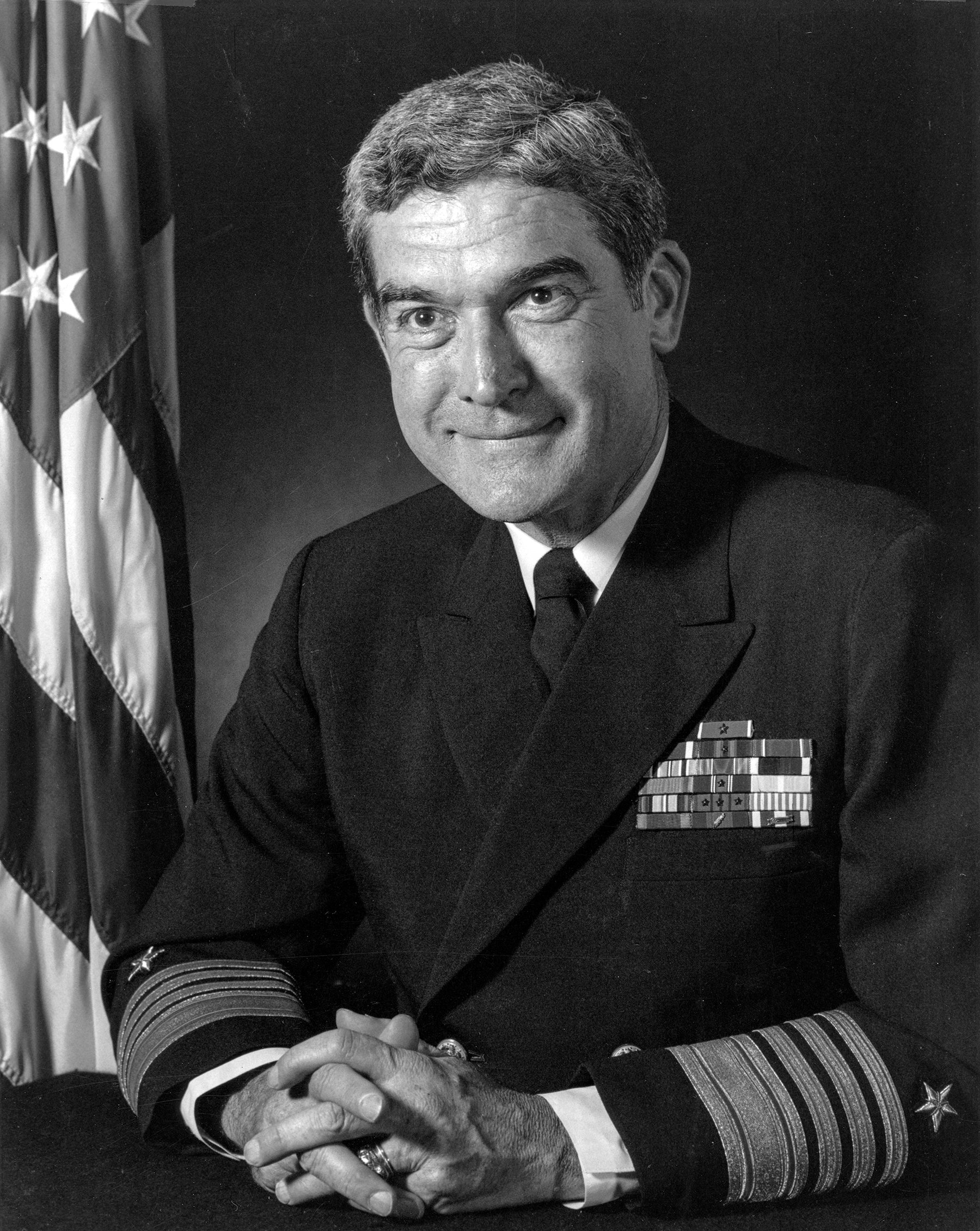
- Born: July 29, 1924; Annapolis, Maryland, U.S.
- Died: October 9, 2016 (aged 92); La Jolla, California, U.S.
- Burial place: Arlington National Cemetery
- Relatives: David W. Bagley (father); David H. Bagley (brother); Worth Bagley (uncle); William Henry Bagley (grandfather)
- Military career
- Allegiance: United States
- Branch: United States Navy
- Service years: 1946–1975
- Rank: Admiral
- Commands: United States Naval Forces Europe; Vice Chief of Naval Operations; Cruiser-Destroyer Flotilla 7 USS Canberra (CA-70); USS Lawrence (DDG-4); USS Bridget (DE-1024)
- Conflicts: Korean War; Vietnam War
- Awards: Navy Distinguished Service Medal (2); Legion of Merit (2)

Worth Harrington Bagley (July 29, 1924 – October 9, 2016) was a four star admiral in the United States Navy who served as Commander in Chief United States Naval Forces Europe from 1973 to 1974 and Vice Chief of Naval Operations from 1974 to 1975. He was born in Annapolis, Maryland and died in La Jolla, California.

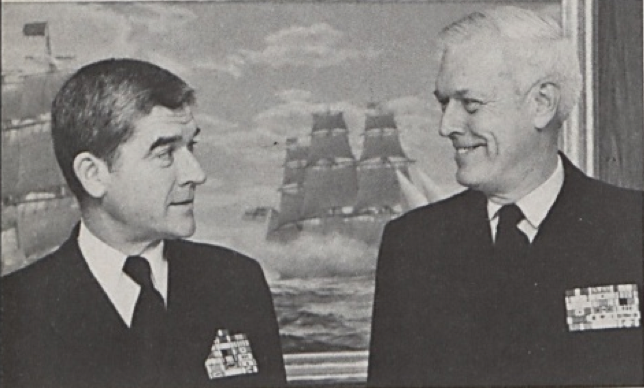
Four-star admirals Worth H. (left) and David H. Bagley.

Military offices
Preceded by James L. Holloway III	Vice Chief of Naval Operations; 1974–1975	Succeeded by Harold E. Shear
