= USS Bagley (FF-1069) =

1971 Knox-class frigate of the US Navy

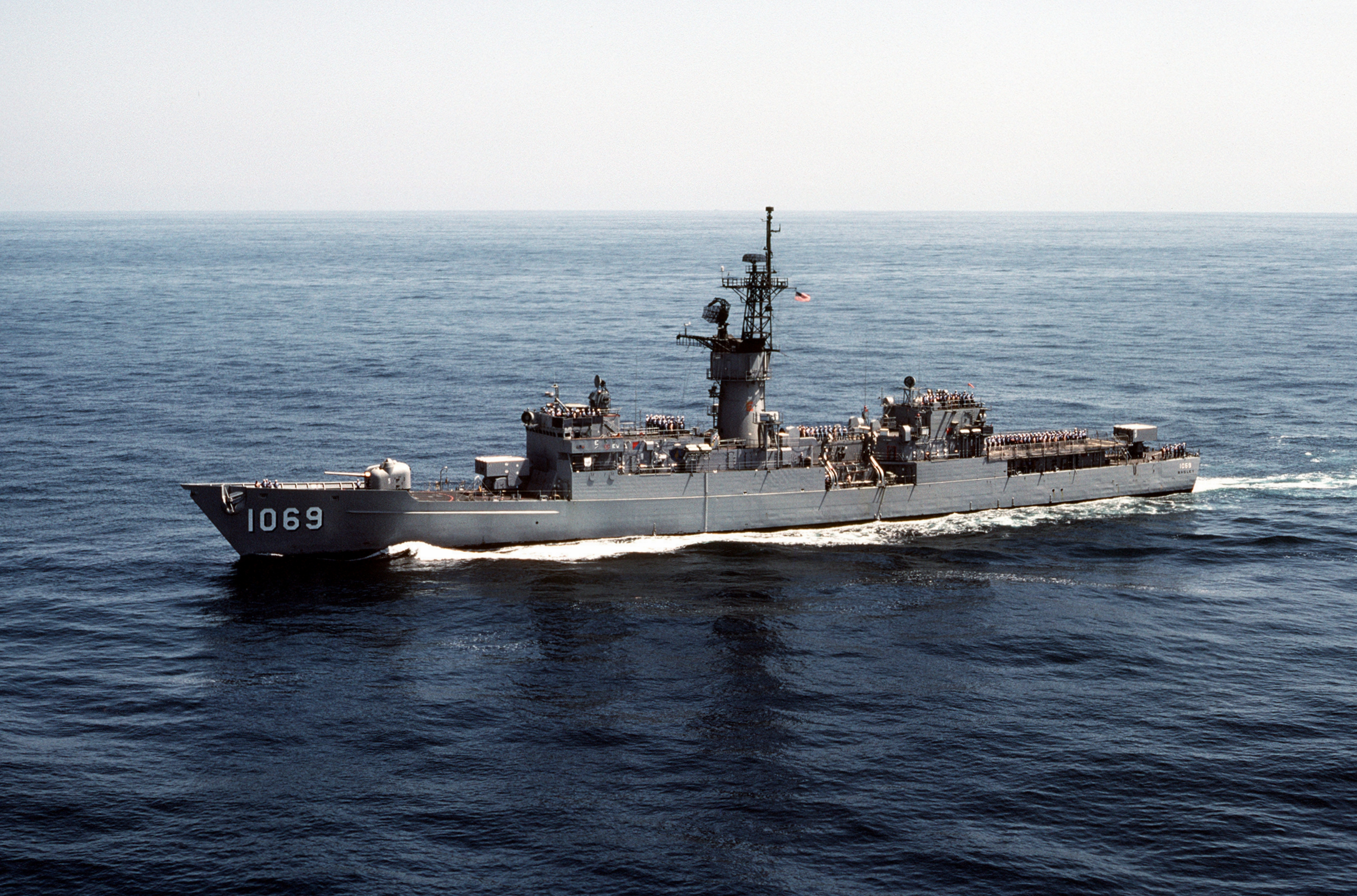
- USS Bagley (FF-1069)

History

United States
- Name: Bagley
- Ordered: 22 July 1964
- Builder: Lockheed Shipbuilding and Construction Company, Seattle, Washington
- Laid down: 22 September 1970
- Launched: 24 April 1971
- Acquired: 28 April 1972
- Commissioned: 6 May 1972
- Decommissioned: 26 September 1991
- Stricken: 11 January 1995
- Motto: Fleets Finest
- Fate: Disposed of by recycling, 19 September 2000

General characteristics
- Class & type: Knox-class frigate
- Displacement: 3,209 tons (4,190 full load)
- Length: 438 ft (133.5 m)
- Beam: 46 ft 9 in (14.2 m)
- Draft: 24 ft 9 in (7.5 m)
- Propulsion: 2 × CE 1200psi boilers; 1 Westinghouse geared turbine; 1 shaft, 35,000 shp (26,099 kW)
- Speed: over 27 knots (50 km/h)
- Range: 4,500 nautical miles (8,300 km) at 20 knots (40 km/h)
- Complement: 18 officers, 267 enlisted
- Sensors & processing systems: AN/SPS-40 Air Search Radar; AN/SPS-67 Surface Search Radar; AN/SQS-26 Sonar; AN/SQR-18 Towed array sonar system; Mk68 Gun Fire Control System
- Electronic warfare & decoys: AN/SLQ-32 Electronics Warfare System, AN/WLR-1c, AN/ULQ-6c
- Armament: one Mk-16 8 cell missile launcher for ASROC and Harpoon missiles; one Mk-42 5-inch/54 caliber gun; Mark 46 torpedoes from four single tube launchers); (Added in Drydock, 1978) one Mk-25 BPDMS launcher for Sea Sparrow missiles, later replaced by Phalanx CIWS
- Aircraft carried: one SH-2 Seasprite (LAMPS I) helicopter

USS Bagley (FF-1069) was a Knox-class frigate of the United States Navy. She was the 18th ship of the Knox class, built as a destroyer escort (DE) and redesignated as a frigate (FF) in the 1975 USN ship reclassification. Bagley was the fourth ship of the USN named for Ensign Worth Bagley, the only US Navy officer killed in action during the Spanish–American War.

== Construction and career ==
Bagley was laid down on 5 October 1970 at Seattle, Washington, by the Lockheed Shipbuilding and Construction Company. The ship was launched on 17 April 1971, sponsored by Mrs. Marie Louise H. Bagley, widow of Admiral David Worth Bagley and posthumous sister-in-law of Ensign Worth Bagley. The vessel was commissioned on 6 May 1972 at the Puget Sound Naval Shipyard.

=== 1972–1979 ===
The escort ship conducted acceptance trials along the coasts of Washington and British Columbia and then headed south for her new home port at San Diego, California, where she arrived on 25 July 1972. The warship began a restricted availability from 31 July to 9 September. She departed San Diego on 16 September, bound for Pearl Harbor and her shakedown cruise. Bagley arrived in Pearl Harbor on 22 September and operated in Hawaiian waters into October. On the 3d of that month, she stood out of Pearl Harbor and headed for San Diego. The warship reached that port on 9 October. Over the next month, she conducted exercises out of San Diego. On 15 November, Bagley entered the Long Beach Naval Shipyard and began an extended post-shakedown availability during which her main propulsion plant was converted to use Navy distillate fuel.

The warship completed repairs and modifications on 4 May 1973 and returned to San Diego that same day. She began training operations along the California coast three days later and continued those evolutions through most of the summer. She stood out of San Diego on 11 September and headed for the western Pacific. She conducted training operations in the Hawaiian Islands 17 September–26 and then resumed her westward voyage. She arrived in Yokosuka, Japan, on 5 October. A week later, the escort ship shaped a course for the Philippines. Bagley arrived in Subic Bay on 17 October for two days of upkeep and liberty. On the 19th, she weighed anchor and headed for a patrol station in the Gulf of Tonkin.

Ten days later, she received orders to accompany the aircraft carrier USS Hancock to the Indian Ocean. That contingency force went to the western portion of the Indian Ocean in response to hostilities that had broken out between Israel and her neighbors, Egypt and Syria (the Yom Kippur War). Bagley spent the next seven weeks on patrol in the Indian Ocean as an indication of American resolve to end the fighting in the Middle East and as a deterrent to keep Soviet forces from intervening in the conflict. During that time, she and the guided missile destroyer USS McCormack entered the Red Sea and docked at the port of Masawa, Ethiopia for a few days.

On 17 December 1973, Bagley reentered Subic Bay for an extended leave and upkeep period. For the remainder of the deployment, the warship participated in the usual 7th Fleet exercises punctuated by port visits to Hong Kong; Keelung, Taiwan; Buckner Bay, Okinawa; Pusan, Korea; and Yokosuka, Japan. On 20 February 1974, she departed Yokosuka and began the voyage home. The warship stopped at Midway Island and Pearl Harbor before arriving in San Diego on 8 March.

For the rest of 1974 and the first six months of 1975, she operated out of San Diego conducting a series of exercises, inspections, and qualifications. On 30 June 1975, Bagley was redesignated a frigate, FF-1069. The warship spent the month of July 1975 preparing for her second deployment to the Far East. She stood out of San Diego on 1 August. Following stops at Pearl Harbor and Guam, the frigate arrived in Subic Bay on 13 September. For the next five months, Bagley conducted normal operations—training evolutions and port visits—with ships of the 7th Fleet. She departed Subic Bay on 12 February 1976 to return to the United States. She stopped at Pearl Harbor from 26 February to 3 March before continuing on to San Diego where she arrived on 1 April. She resumed normal operations out of San Diego, and continued that duty into 1977.

On 17 February 1977, she shaped a course for Hawaiian waters where she joined ships of the American, Australian, Canadian, and New Zealand navies in Exercise RIMPAC 77. The frigate returned to San Diego on 12 March and, two days later, was drydocked in the Long Beach Naval Shipyard for hull repairs. She came out of drydock on 2 April and returned to San Diego on the 6th.

Bagley weighed anchor again 12 April 1977 and set course for the Orient. She made the usual stopover at Pearl Harbor and arrived in Subic Bay on 6 May. During this six months in the Far East, the frigate visited most of the usual liberty ports and participated in a number of training exercises with other ships of the 7th Fleet. On 6 November, she departed Yokosuka for an uninterrupted voyage to San Diego. The warship reentered her home port on 21 November and remained there through the end of the year.

The frigate conducted normal operations out of San Diego during the first six weeks of 1978. On 14 February 1978, she entered the Long Beach Naval Shipyard for an overhaul that occupied the rest of 1978. She completed post-overhaul trials and tests in January 1979 and resumed operations out of San Diego early in February. Exercises, qualifications, and tests in the southern California operating area occupied her throughout 1979 and for most of the first two months of 1980. The warship departed San Diego on 25 February, bound ultimately for the Far East. En route to the western Pacific, however, she participated in the multinational Exercise RIMPAC 80 conducted in the Hawaiian Islands. She resumed her voyage west on 19 March and entered Subic Bay on 8 April.

=== 1980–1989 ===
After conducting training operations—notably gunfire support drills and ASROC firings—in the Subic Bay operating area, Bagley departed the Philippines late in April in company with a task force built around the aircraft carrier USS Constellation. The task force constituted a part of the increased American military presence in the western Indian Ocean deemed necessary after radical Iranian students occupied the American embassy in Tehran and took the American diplomatic staff hostage. The continuing hostage crisis and hostilities between Iran and Iraq kept a large number of Navy ships on patrol in nearby waters. Bagley's task force remained in the vicinity until 29 July when it headed back to the Pacific. En route to the Philippines, she stopped at Singapore and at Pattaya, Thailand. She reentered Subic Bay on 20 August with 36 Vietnamese refugees whom she had rescued on the passage from Thailand. Bagley voyaged to Pusan, Korea, for a goodwill port call in mid-September and returned to Subic Bay on 23 September. On 1 October, the frigate got underway to return to the United States. After the customary pause at Pearl Harbor, Bagley arrived back in San Diego on 15 October. Except for a brief period underway on 20 November, the frigate remained in port at San Diego for the remainder of 1980.

She continued the inport period through the first seven weeks of 1981. On 18 February, Bagley resumed normal operations in the southern California operating area. Fleet exercises and single ship drills occupied her until 20 October 1981 when she again headed for the Far East. She stopped at Pearl Harbor 31 October – 2 November and then resumed her voyage west. Bagley arrived in Subic Bay on 22 November. She operated out of Subic Bay until early when she headed for the Indian Ocean. En route to Indian Ocean contingency operations, the warship encountered Vietnamese refugees adrift in a boat in the South China Sea. She took the boat's 37 occupants on board, sank the boat as a potential hazard to navigation, and proceeded to Singapore where she disembarked the refugees. The frigate resumed her voyage to the Indian Ocean on 12 December and arrived at Al Masirah, Oman, on the last day of 1981.

The year 1982, opened with Bagley operating in the western Indian Ocean and in the Arabian Sea. That deployment lasted until late January when she made a port visit to Mombasa, Kenya, before heading back to the Far East. On that journey, she took a very circuitous route, visiting the Australian port of Geraldton, Diego Garcia Island, and Penang in Malaysia, before returning to Subic Bay in mid-April. Late in April and early in May, Bagley took part in readiness exercises carried out near Guam in company with Constellation, USS Midway and USS Ranger. At the conclusion of those evolutions on 8 May, the frigate set a course, via Hawaii, to the west coast and reentered San Diego on 23 May. After the customary month of post-deployment leave and upkeep, Bagley resumed normal training duty in California waters and remained so occupied for the rest of the year.

Local operations out of San Diego kept the frigate busy well into 1983. She did not set out for another overseas assignment until 9 June when she put to sea, once again bound for the western Pacific. Along the way, Bagley and her travelling companions USS New Jersey, USS Callaghan, USS John A. Moore, and USS Meyerkord spent a week in the Hawaiian Islands in mid-June before resuming the voyage west on the 17th. The warships "INCHOPped" (changed operational control) to the Commander, 7th Fleet, on 27 June and reached the Philippines at Manila on Independence Day 1983. Over the next five months, the frigate took part in a number of exercises at sea, most often with a task group built around Midway, and visited a series of Far Eastern ports. On 17 July 1983 enroute to Sembawang, Singapore the Bagley crossed the equator at Latitude 000.00 by Longitude 105.39.6 and presented King Neptune with worthy sailors. Late in July, she visited Singapore and Thailand before heading for a set of exercises in Korean waters carried out at the end of July and during the first part of August. After a call at Guam in late August and early September, Bagley steamed to Sasebo, Japan, whence she operated until the first week in November when she returned to the Philippines at Subic Bay. The warship made one more stop at a Japanese port, Yokosuka, and then headed back to the United States on 1 December. She called briefly at Pearl Harbor before arriving back in San Diego on 13 December 1983.

Post-deployment leave and upkeep kept Bagley immobile at San Diego for the rest of the year and during the first half of January 1984. In fact, despite a short two-day period underway between 17 and 19 January, she did not resume normal west coast operations until the second week in February when she put to sea for READIEX 84-2 and a cruise to the Pacific coast of Central America. Bagley returned to San Diego from those missions on 9 March and remained there until 22 March. At that time, the warship headed north to Esquimalt, British Columbia, where she took part in CNO Project 371, tests on new submarine torpedo designs. She completed her part in the tests on 30 March and, after visits to Vancouver, British Columbia, and to San Francisco, returned to San Diego on 11 April. Just over a month after her return, Bagley began an eight-month regular overhaul at the naval station.

Bagley completed the overhaul on 19 January 1985 and embarked upon more than four months of post-overhaul checks, qualifications, and certifications. These she carried out in a long series of short underway periods in nearby waters. Late in May, the frigate participated in Exercise EASTPAC 85-5 conducted in late May and early June. At the conclusion of the evolution, Bagley called at Portland, Oregon, for that city's Rose Festival and then moved on to Concord, California, to load ammunition. "Bagley" then visited San Francisco before returning to San Diego on 22 June. Except for another visit to CFB Esquimalt in September, followed by Bagley's arrival in San Francisco, on 12 October 1985, for the start of Navy Fleet Week '85 activities. Bagley operated locally out of San Diego for the remaining months of the year.

Her west coast employment came to an end early in 1986. On 15 January, the warship set out on her first overseas deployment in two years as part of a task group built around the aircraft carrier USS Enterprise. After reaching Pearl Harbor on 21 January, she spent the rest of January in Hawaii taking part in a series of exercises and then resumed her voyage to the Far East on 2 February. Bagley arrived in Subic Bay on 17 February and made a port of call in Olongapo City. Bagley operated locally in the waters off of the coast of the Republic of the Philippines for the rest of the month. Early in March, the frigate's task group visited Singapore on the way to duty in the eastern Indian Ocean, the Arabian Sea, and the Mediterranean Sea. While operating in the "I.O." Bagley briefly anchored off of the coast of Mombasa, Kenya, however the crew was denied liberty there, due to concerns over the AIDS epidemic there. After months in the Indian Ocean, Bagley participated in joint exercises with units of the Pakistani Navy. Then, she stopped off at Karachi, Pakistan, between 15 and 17 March before dropping anchor at Masirah Island, Oman, on the 18th. On 9 April, Bagley set out for Diego Garcia Island at which place she called briefly on the 12th before shaping a course for the Suez Canal.

The Enterprise battle group, "Battle Group Foxtrot," transited the canal on 28 and 29 April 1986 and arrived in the Mediterranean to reinforce American forces there which were already engaged in "Operation El Dorado Canyon," a series of retaliatory actions against the provocations and terrorist activities of Libya's Colonel Muammar al-Gaddafi. Bagley and her battle group spent the next two months cruising the Mediterranean in support of American foreign policy, and patrolling along the "Line of death", While operating in the Mediterranean Sea, Bagley made ports of call in Monte Carlo, the Principality of Monaco, Gaeta, Italy and Catania, on the island of Sicily. On 28 June, she left Catania, Italy, steamed through the Suez Canal, crossed the Indian Ocean, and arrived in Subic Bay on 17 July. She returned to sea with the task group on the 22nd bound for home. After the customary port of call at Oahu, where Bagley picked up family members of the crew, for the "Tiger Cruise" portion of the deployment, back to home port, the warship reentered San Diego on 11 August. Bagley earned the Meritorious Unit Commendation Ribbon and the Navy Expeditionary Medal for its outstanding service during operations while on deployment, as well as another Sea Service Ribbon. Bagley returned from its extended deployment, having conducted operations in three of the U.S. Navy's four active fleets, and began an extended post-deployment standdown period soon after! In fact, the Knox-class frigate left port only briefly on four occasions in October; the rest of the year she spent in San Diego.

Another series of four brief underway periods in January 1987 punctuated a month otherwise spent largely in upkeep. In February, she traveled to Concord where she unloaded ammunition before beginning a restricted availability at San Diego on the 16th. The repair period lasted until early summer and included a seven-week drydocking in USS Steadfast that occupied most of April and all of May. Late in June 1987, Bagley resumed normal operations out of San Diego; and, except for operations in the Bering Sea that took up most of November, she remained active in the immediate vicinity of San Diego for the rest of the year.

As 1987 waned and 1988 began, however, Bagley anticipated imminent departure for overseas duty. She stood out of San Diego on 4 January 1988 in company once more with the Enterprise task group. The warships made an unusual nonstop, but leisurely, Pacific crossing during which they carried out a five-day readiness exercise in the Hawaiian operating area. The frigate and her colleagues reached Subic Bay in the Philippines on 1 February and remained in that port until the 6th. On that day she and the other warships in the group got underway for a tour of duty in the Arabian Sea, returning once more to a region of chronic political convulsions spawned by a decade of Iranian provocations. En route to the Arabian Sea, Bagley participated in a series of exercises with units of the Indonesian Navy. She and her units reached their destination at mid-month and relieved the Midway task group as contingency force on station. For about two months, Bagley patrolled the waters of the northern Arabian Sea with her task group with the only untoward event being the loss of her helicopter which ditched because of a material casualty.

During Operation Earnest Will, USS Samuel B. Roberts struck an Iranian mine and suffered severe damage on 14 April 1988. Bagley was one of the warships selected to retaliate on the Iranians in Operation Praying Mantis. Accordingly, she joined USS Wainwright and USS Simpson on 18 April, and the three warships steered for the Sirri Island oil platform which they then put out of operation with gunfire. Soon after destroying the oil platform, the trio engaged the Iranian Kaman-class patrol boat Joshan with surface-to-surface missiles and finished her off with gunfire. When a Marine Corps AH-1 Cobra helicopter operating from Wainwright failed to return after the actions of the 18th, Bagley spent the next two days engaged in a futile search for the missing aircraft and its crew. It became apparent that the helicopter went down during the operation when the bodies of the crew, Marine Corps Captains Stephen C. Leslie and Kenneth W. Hill were recovered almost a month later about 15 miles (24 km) southeast of Abu Musa Island.

Late in April 1988, Bagley and USS Lynde McCormick escorted USS San Jose and MV Matthiasen through the Strait of Hormuz into the Arabian Sea. The warship then resumed operations in the northern reaches of that sea. That employment lasted until 15 May when Bagley parted company with the task unit and joined USS Reasoner in setting a generally easterly course. After exercises with units of the Indonesian and Malaysian navies and a series of port calls in the Philippines and along the coast of the Asian continent, the warship set out from Pusan, Korea, on 17 June to return to the United States. She stopped off at Seattle to embark a group of male relatives and friends of her crewmen for the last leg of the voyage home and completed this "Tiger" portion of the journey at San Diego on 2 July.

After more than a month of post-deployment standdown at San Diego, Bagley resumed normal duty training in waters along the west coast. Exercises, drills, and inspections—the normal fare of west coast operations—occupied the warship for the remainder of 1988 and the first two months of 1989. She entered drydock in Steadfast at San Diego at the end of February 1989 and remained docked for the entire month of March. Exiting the drydock on 4 April, she continued repairs and the installation of new equipment until mid-May. At that time she resumed her schedule of west-coast training missions and continued so engaged through the summer.

On 18 September 1989, Bagley embarked once again on the long voyage to the Far East and another several months of service there and in the Arabian Sea. This particular passage to the Orient, however, played out differently than most because the frigate and her task group remained at sea for more than a month before entering port in the Far East. Bagley's unit rendezvoused with two other units—one built around the aircraft carrier USS Carl Vinson and the other around Constellation—and sailed north to conduct the exercise Operation PACEX 89 in the vicinity of the Aleutian Islands during the period between 20 September and 30. In October, the warship took part in Operation ANNUALEX 89 with the Carl Vinson group augmented by the battleships USS Missouri and USS New Jersey. That exercise ranged westward across the northern Pacific and then north into the Sea of Japan. At one point in the massive operation, elements of the Japanese Maritime Self-Defense Force joined American warships and planes in carrying out bilateral training in the waters surrounding Okinawa. The crossing, prolonged by the exercise, ended with Operation Valiant Blitz carried out with units of the South Korean Navy in the Sea of Japan.

On 31 October 1989, Bagley and her colleagues made their first port of call since leaving North America in mid-September when they arrived in Hong Kong. After nearly a week of liberty, the warship returned to sea with the task group on 6 November for the voyage to the Philippines and arrived in Subic Bay on the 11th. She spent the next four weeks either in port at Subic Bay or operating in nearby waters. On 10 December, she set out for a tour of duty with the contingency forces operating in the Arabian Sea. Along the way, she made a liberty call at Pattaya Beach, Thailand, another at Singapore, and a resupply stop a Diego Garcia Island before arriving on station in the Arabian Sea in mid-January 1990. Her stay in the troubled region proved a brief one, however, for she called only once at a local port, Muscat in Oman between the 20th and the 22d, and cleared the region entirely early in February 1990. After visits to Penang, Malaysia, and Subic Bay, Bagley set out on the voyage home on 23 February. She stopped along the way at Pearl Harbor in Hawaii and reentered San Diego on 16 March 1990.

=== Decommissioning ===
Following the customary post-deployment standdown, the frigate put to sea on 27 April to take up normal west coast training missions once again. For almost 10 months, she carried out the usual schedule of drills, exercises, and inspections punctuated with visits to variety of ports in the United States and Canada. She continued so occupied through 1990 and into the early months of 1991. In February 1991, however, Bagley embarked upon a brief, but novel, phase of her career when she left San Diego on the 15th bound for the coast of Central America for two months of drug interdiction duty. During that period, she cruised the Pacific coasts of Guatemala, El Salvador, Panama and Costa Rica stopping and inspecting fishing boats and other small craft and carrying out air tracking operations. The warship concluded the assignment on 3 April and headed back to San Diego where she arrived on the 9th. Over the last five months of her active service, the warship spent a lot of time in port at San Diego. She did put to sea occasionally both to prepare for her final material inspection or to visit ports farther up the coast. She returned to San Diego from her last underway period on 8 July 1991 and secured fires for the last time. After almost 12 weeks of final preparations, Bagley was decommissioned at San Diego on 26 September 1991. Her name was stricken from the Naval Vessel Register on 11 January 1995 and later sold for scrapping. Bagley was cut up and recycled by the end of September 2000.
