= Josephus Daniels House =

Historic house in North Carolina, United States

- U.S. National Register of Historic Places
- Former U.S. National Historic Landmark
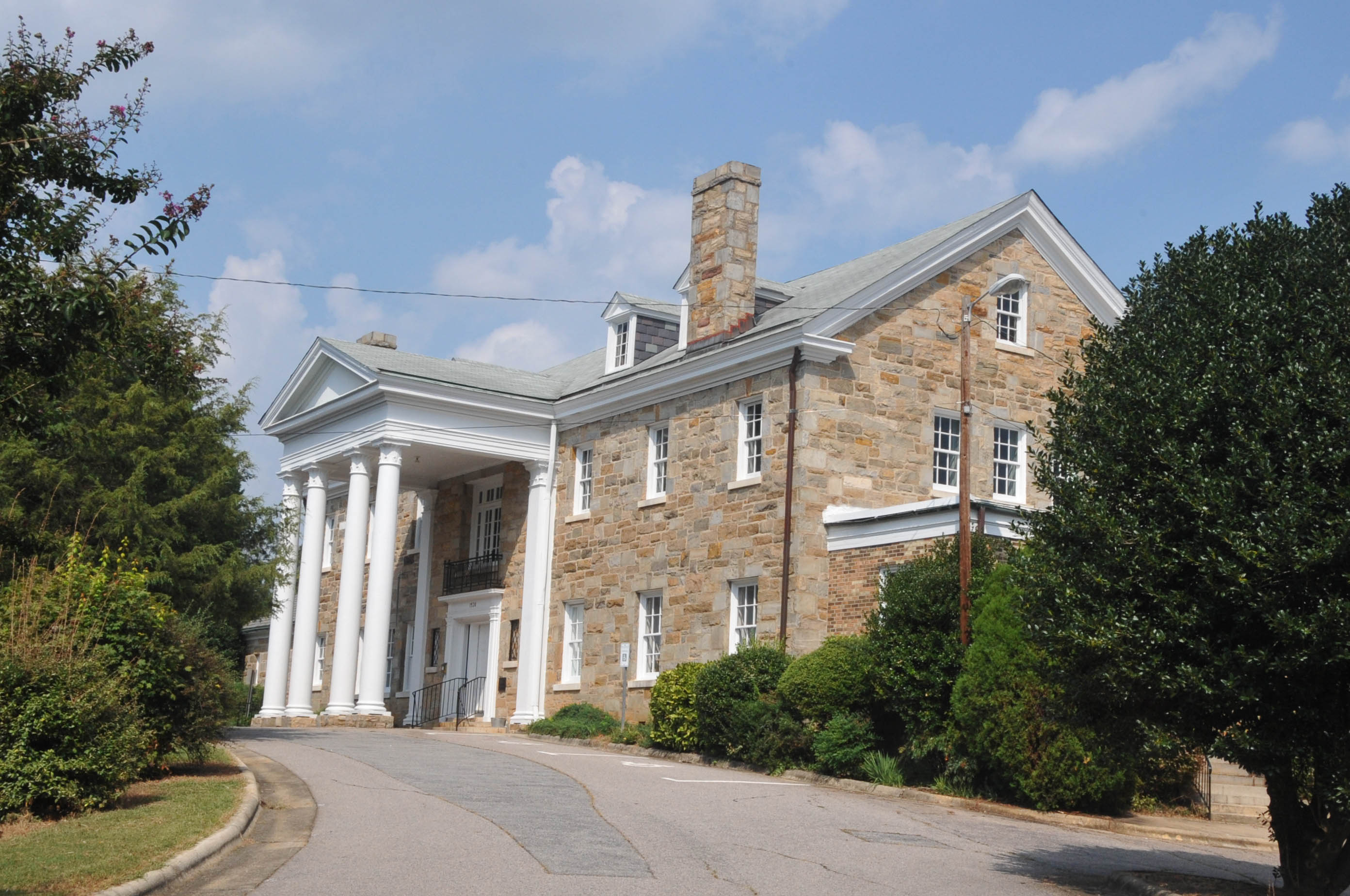

- Location within North Carolina Location within the United States
- Location: 1520 Caswell St., Raleigh, North Carolina
- Coordinates: 35°47′56.65″N 78°38′50.43″W
- Area: 3 acres (12,000 m^{2})
- Built: 1920
- Architectural style: Colonial Revival
- Demolished: 2021
- NRHP reference No.: 76001342

Significant dates
- Added to NRHP: December 8, 1976
- Designated NHL: December 8, 1976
- Delisted NHL: September 2, 2024

The Josephus Daniels House, also known as Wakestone, and later the Masonic Temple of Raleigh, was a historic mansion at 1520 Caswell Street in Raleigh, North Carolina. Built in 1920, it was the home until his death in 1948 of Josephus Daniels, influential Secretary of the Navy under President Woodrow Wilson, as well as a controversial editor of The News & Observer in Raleigh for decades. It was declared a National Historic Landmark in 1976. After Daniels' death it was purchased by the local Freemasons, who made additions to the building and continued to use it as their meeting hall into the 21st century. The building was demolished in August 2021 to make way for a new development of high end homes.

== Description and History ==
The former Daniels House was named Wakestone by Josephus' wife, Addie Worth Bagley Daniels. It stood in a residential area north of downtown Raleigh, on a 3-acre (1.2 ha) landscaped parcel bounded on the east by Glenwood Avenue (United States Route 70), on the south by Wade Avenue, and on the west by Caswell Street, where the main drive entered the property. The property was separated from other residential properties to the north by a hedgerow. The house was oriented facing west, with a curving drive providing access to parking areas to the west and south (formerly the sites of gardens kept by Mr. and Mrs. Daniels). The house was a 2 1/2-story stone structure, roughly U-shaped, with a rectangular main block and two wings extending eastward to the rear. The area between the two rear wings was filled in and extended further east, with a large meeting space added by the Masons in the 1950s. This addition was built of similar stone to the main house, and did not detract from the view of the house as seen from the front.

Wakestone was also described as "the world's smallest naval base". According to local lore, upon his retirement from the Navy, Daniels asked that a naval gun be placed in his front yard. In order to complete his request, supposedly, a small part of the property had to be designated as a naval base. While it remained, the gun was located in front of the building's front porch.

The front facade of the house was dominated by a four-column Neoclassical Greek portico, its columns capped by Egyptian capitals, and supporting a fully pedimented gable. The main entrance was flanked by sidelight windows and pilasters, which rose to an architrave and an iron-balustraded balcony for the second floor. The interior of the house retained many fine finishes, although some of its upstairs bedrooms had been converted into meeting spaces, and much of the eastern outer wall was removed to provide access to the large meeting wing.

Josephus Daniels, for whom the house was built in 1920, was one of the most important US Secretaries of the Navy in the 20th century, serving from 1913 to 1921 under President Woodrow Wilson. Daniels brought the Navy to a wartime footing during World War I, and oversaw many improvements and reforms in its operations and practices. He provided educational opportunities for poor and illiterate personnel, provided for the enlistment of women, banned alcohol from the officer's mess, and combated collusive bidding practices in government contracting. He later served as United States Ambassador to Mexico, where he antagonized American oil interests by refusing to promote their agenda.

Daniels was also a newspaper editor from the 1880s until his death - For decades he managed The News & Observer in Raleigh, at the time North Carolina's largest circulation newspaper. He and his newspaper "championed the white supremacy cause in frequent news reports, vigorously worded editorials, provocative letters, and vicious front page cartoons that called attention to what the newspaper called the horrors of 'negro rule.'" Daniels argued that as long as African Americans had any political power, they would block progressive reforms.

== Fate ==
In February 2021, the Raleigh City Council voted to revoke the property's historic landmark status, reportedly due to its association with Josephus Daniels, who, in addition to being a vehement white supremacist and segregationist, was also one of the leading perpetrators of the Wilmington massacre.

The house was bought on March 10, 2021 by Beacon Street Caswell LLC and was torn down in August 2021. Its National Historic Landmark designation was withdrawn in 2024.

== See also ==
- List of National Historic Landmarks in North Carolina
- National Register of Historic Places listings in Wake County, North Carolina
- Josephus Daniels biographical page
