= USS Steadfast =

AFDM-14-class dry dock of the United States Navy

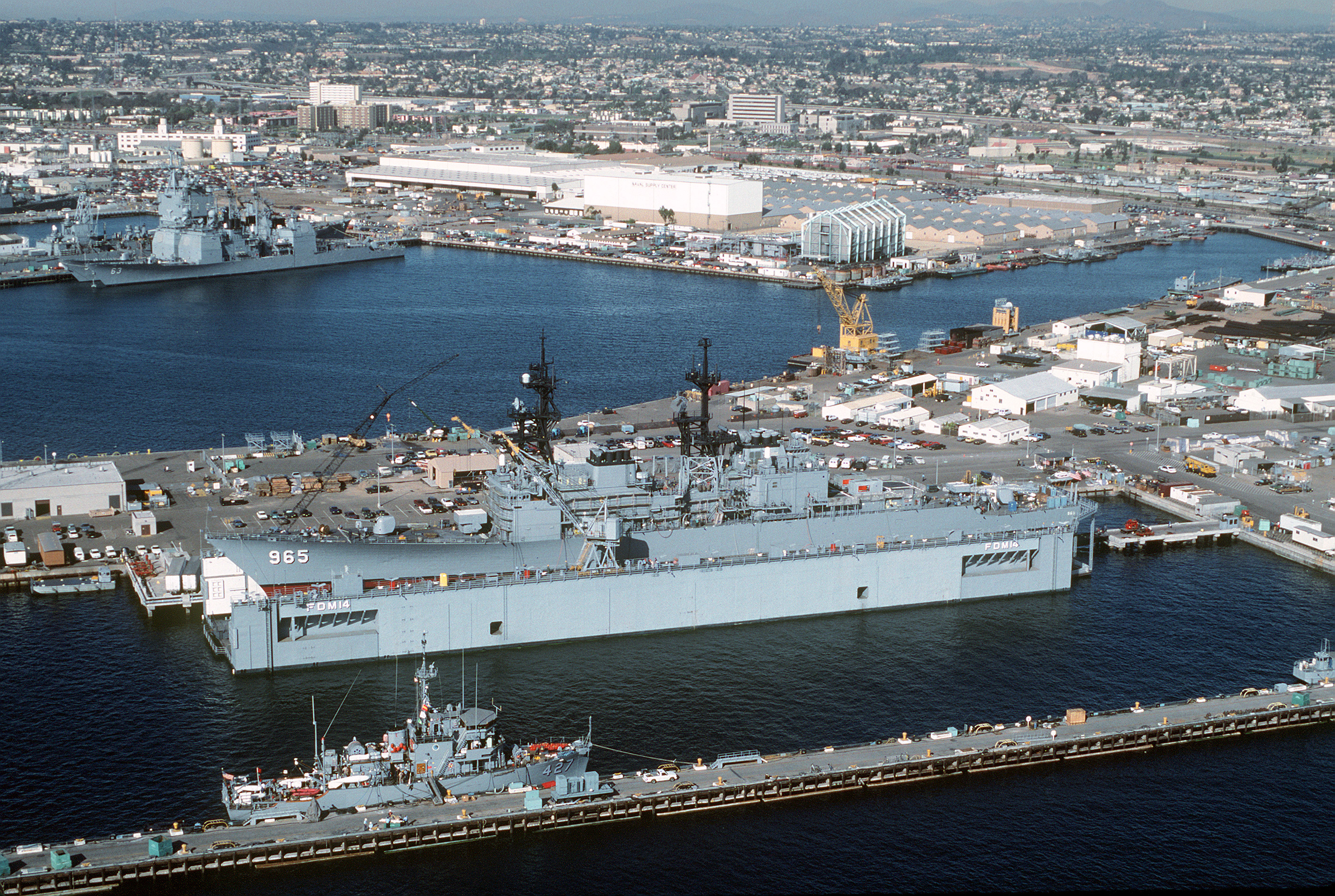
- USS Steadfast and USS Kinkaid

History

United States
- Name: Steadfast
- Namesake: Steadfast
- Builder: Pollock Shipbuilding Co.
- Laid down: 1945
- Acquired: 1 July 1945
- Commissioned: 1945
- Decommissioned: 1998
- Reclassified: AFDM-14, 1981
- Stricken: 7 February 1999
- Identification: Callsign: NCTJ; Hull number: YFD-71
- Motto: Safety, Quality
- Honors and awards: See Awards
- Fate: Sold to BAE Systems
- Status: Operational in San Francisco, California

General characteristics
- Class & type: AFDM-14-class floating drydock
- Displacement: 5,900 t (5,807 long tons), light load; 17,500 t (17,224 long tons), full load
- Length: 528 ft 0 in (160.93 m)
- Beam: 118 ft 0 in (35.97 m)
- Draft: 5 ft (1.5 m)
- Complement: 3 officers, 113 enlisted

USS Steadfast (AFDM-14) (former YFD-71) is a AFDM-14-class floating dry dock built in 1945 and operated by the United States Navy.

== Construction and career ==
YFD-71 was built by the Pollock Shipbuilding Co., in Stockton, California in 1945. She would be commissioned later in 1945 after her delivery to the Navy on 1 July.

In 1981, the dry dock was re-designated as AFDM-14. She would be given the name Steadfast later in 1984. On 1 April 1986, USS Tuscaloosa (LST-1187) was seen dry docked inside Steadfast at National Steel and Shipbuilding Company. In February 1987, USS Bagley (FF-1069) traveled to Concord Naval Weapons Station where she unloaded ammunition before beginning a restricted availability at San Diego on the 16th. The repair period lasted until early summer and included a seven-week drydocking in Steadfast that occupied most of April and all of May.

In January 1992, USS Kinkaid (DD-965) was dry docked inside Steadfast. On 15 March 1994, USS Chandler (DDG-996) began a six-month selected restricted availability at Continental Maritime in San Diego, which lasted from 15 March until 19 May in the floating dry dock Steadfast. On 8 January 1996, Steadfast was dry docked at Long Beach Naval Shipyard. Steadfast was decommissioned in 1998 and sold to BAE Systems Ship Repair San Francisco, renamed Eureka. Struck from the Naval Register on 7 February 1999.

In 2009, SS Jeremiah O'Brien was dry docked inside Eureka at Pier 70.

On 2 January 2017, the shipyard was sold to Puglia Engineering, Inc.

== Awards ==
- American Campaign Medal
- World War II Victory Medal
- National Defense Service Medal
