= Josephus Daniels =

American diplomat and newspaper editor (1862–1948)

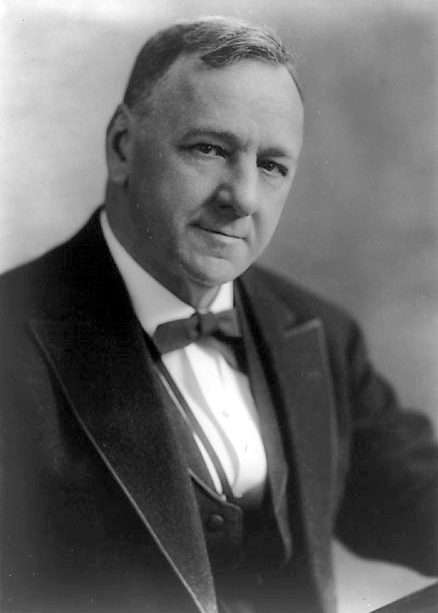
- Daniels c. 1920

10th United States Ambassador to Mexico
- In office April 24, 1933 – November 9, 1941
- President: Franklin D. Roosevelt
- Preceded by: J. Reuben Clark
- Succeeded by: George S. Messersmith

41st United States Secretary of the Navy
- In office March 5, 1913 – March 4, 1921
- President: Woodrow Wilson
- Deputy: Franklin D. Roosevelt; Gordon Woodbury
- Preceded by: George Meyer
- Succeeded by: Edwin Denby

Personal details
- Born: May 18, 1862 Washington, North Carolina, C.S.
- Died: January 15, 1948 (aged 85) Raleigh, North Carolina, U.S.
- Party: Democratic
- Spouse: Addie Worth Bagley (m. 1888; died 1943)
- Children: 4, including Jonathan
- Education: University of North Carolina (attended)

Josephus Daniels (May 18, 1862 – January 15, 1948) was a newspaper editor, Secretary of the Navy under President Woodrow Wilson, and U.S. Ambassador to Mexico under President Franklin D. Roosevelt.

He managed The News & Observer in Raleigh, at the time North Carolina's largest circulation newspaper, from the 1890s until his death. Daniels was a vehement white supremacist and segregationist; he and his newspaper "championed the white supremacy cause in frequent news reports, vigorously worded editorials, provocative letters, and vicious front page cartoons that called attention to what the newspaper called the horrors of 'negro rule.'"

Along with Charles Brantley Aycock and Furnifold McLendel Simmons, he was a leading perpetrator of the Wilmington massacre, in which white mobs overthrew the legitimately elected biracial government in Wilmington, expelled black and white political leaders from the city, destroyed the property and businesses of black citizens built up since the American Civil War, and killed between 60 and 300 black people. He was highly influential in the state legislature's passage in 1900 of a suffrage amendment that effectively disenfranchised most blacks in the state, excluding them from the political system for decades until the late 20th century.

A Democrat, he had been a leading progressive in the early 20th century, supporting public schools and public works, and calling for more regulation of trusts and railroads. He supported prohibition and women's suffrage, and used his newspapers to support the regular Democratic Party ticket.

He was appointed by President Woodrow Wilson to serve as Secretary of the Navy during World War I. He became a close friend and supporter of Franklin D. Roosevelt, then the Assistant Secretary of the Navy. As Secretary of the Navy, Daniels handled policy and formalities in World War I while his top aide, Roosevelt, handled the major wartime decisions. After Roosevelt was elected President of the United States, he appointed Daniels as his U.S. Ambassador to Mexico, serving from 1933 to 1941. Daniels worked to repair relations with the government that had been damaged during the Mexican Revolution as part of Roosevelt's "Good Neighbor Policy". In accordance with that policy Daniels and the Roosevelt Administration took a less adversarial position toward the government's 1938 expropriation of American and other foreign oil holdings than other foreign governments had. In 1941, Daniels resumed the editor's post at The News & Observer.

== Early life and career ==
Josephus Daniels was born in Washington, North Carolina, on May 18, 1862, a son of shipbuilder Josephus Daniels and Mary Cleaves (Seabrook) Daniels. His brother Frank was a prominent state court judge, while his brother Charles served as an assistant US attorney general in the administration of Woodrow Wilson. Before the war, Josephus Daniels Sr. was a Whig and supporter of the Union. During the American Civil War, he repaired and maintained ships for the Confederate States Navy in Wilmington, North Carolina. Josephus Daniels Sr. was killed in Washington, North Carolina, when the steamship on which he was traveling was fired at by Confederate troops. The younger Daniels moved with his widowed mother and two siblings to Wilson, North Carolina, where she supported the family as the town postmaster. He was educated at Wilson Collegiate Institute.

Daniels edited and eventually purchased a local newspaper, the Wilson Advance. Within a few years, he became part owner, along with his brother Charles, of the Kinston Free Press and the Rocky Mount Reporter. He studied law for two years at the University of North Carolina (today the University of North Carolina at Chapel Hill) and was admitted to the bar in 1885, but did not practice law.

After becoming increasingly involved in the North Carolina Democratic Party and taking over the weekly paper Daily State Chronicle, Daniels served as North Carolina's state printer from 1887 to 1893. He was appointed as chief clerk of the U.S. Department of the Interior under Grover Cleveland in 1893–95.

== The News & Observer ==
In 1894, with the financial assistance of industrialist Julian S. Carr, also a white supremacist, Daniels acquired a controlling interest in Raleigh's News & Observer, and left his federal position. Under his leadership, the paper was a strong advocate for the Democratic Party, which at the time was struggling to maintain its power in the state against a fusion of the Republicans and Populists.

According to Daniels in his autobiography, "The News & Observer was relied upon to carry the Democratic message and to be the militant voice of White Supremacy, and it did not fail in what was expected." Daniels printed numerous articles intended to stoke fears of black men as rapists of white women. A lone white woman noticing a black man in her vicinity would be written up in the paper as a narrowly avoided rape. Daniels also argued that achieving political office emboldened black men to commit more outrages against white women.

He hired cartoonist Norman E. Jennett to spread his message among the 25 percent of white voters who were illiterate. Daniels admitted later that actual assaults committed by black men on white women were very few in number. However his newspaper coverage had the desired effect of winning Populists over to the Democratic Party. Newspapers were sold at cost to the Democratic Party, which distributed them to white voters.

According to historian Helen Edmonds, the paper "led in a campaign of prejudice, bitterness, vilification, misrepresentation, and exaggeration to influence the emotions of the whites against the Negro." The result was the only successful coup d'état in American history, the overthrow of an elected government by force in the Wilmington massacre. In the findings of the Wilmington Race Riot Commission, Daniels is the only name mentioned as a cause of the insurrection. Later in life, while discussing his success, "Daniels admitted that the paper was occasionally excessive in its bias toward Democrats and that stories were not fully researched before publication and probably could not be 'sustained in a court of justice.'"

Daniels never apologized for using the newspaper to encourage white supremacist violence in 1898. In his memoir, he spoke positively about the actions of Red Shirts and how his white supremacy campaign had crushed "Negro domination". The News & Observer remained under the control of Daniels's family until 1995, when it was sold to The McClatchy Company. In 2006 the newspaper published an editorial apologizing for its role in the Wilmington insurrection of 1898 and consequent massacre.

The white supremacy campaign led to Democratic victories in 1898 and 1900. Having regained control of the state legislature, the Democrats passed a suffrage amendment raising barriers to voter registration, which disenfranchised most African Americans in the state. The political exclusion was maintained into the late 1960s.

Daniels also supported a number of progressive causes, such as public education and anti-child-labor laws.

== Secretary of the Navy ==
Daniels supported native Southerner Woodrow Wilson in the 1912 presidential election. After Wilson's victory, he was appointed as Secretary of the Navy.

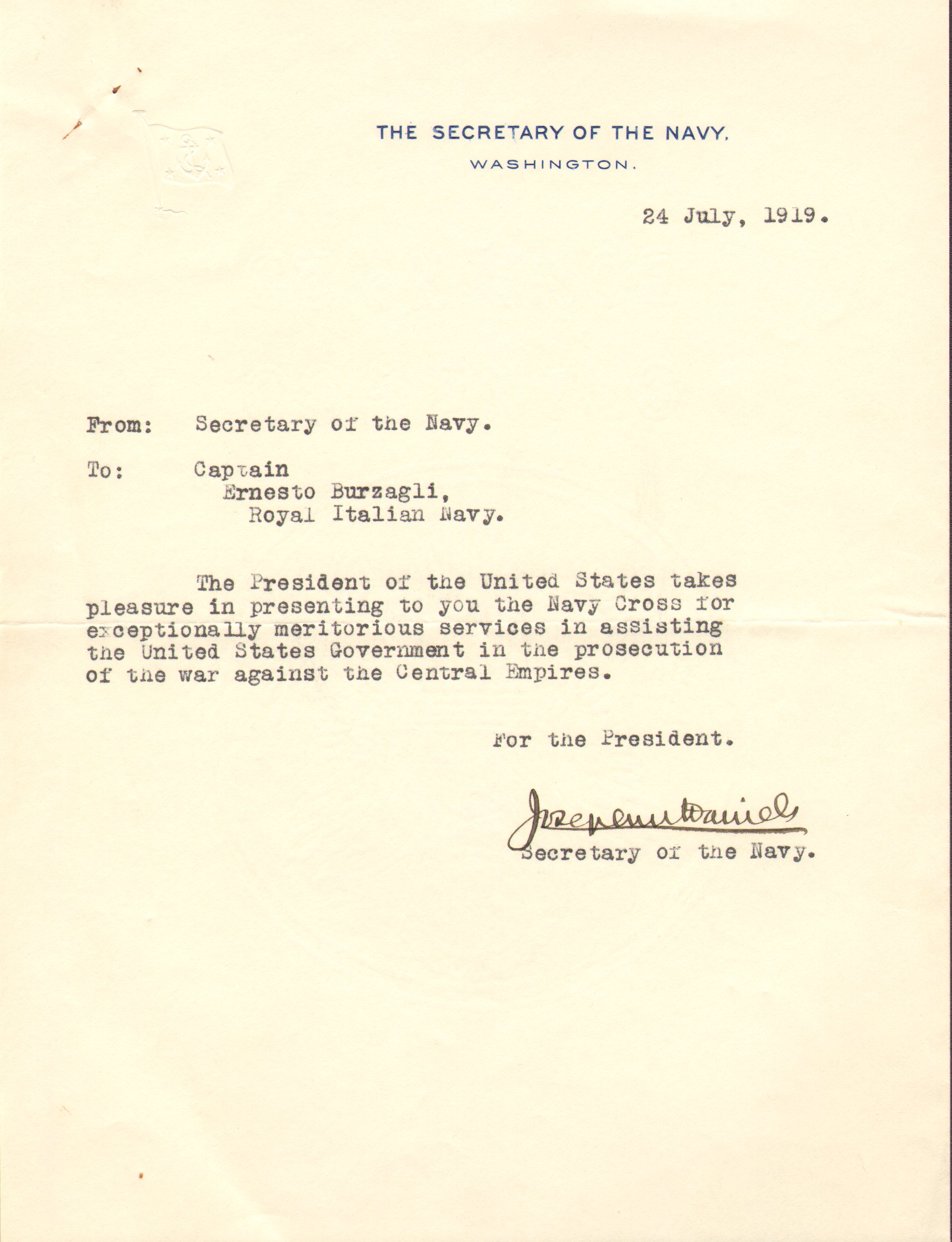
Letter from Daniels confirming that the Navy Cross was conferred on Ernesto Burzagli in the name of the President of the United States in 1919. Captain Burzagli was an officer in the Royal Italian Navy.

Secretary Daniels held the post from 1913 to 1921, throughout the Wilson administration, overseeing the Navy during World War I. Franklin D. Roosevelt, a future U.S. president, served as his Assistant Secretary of the Navy.

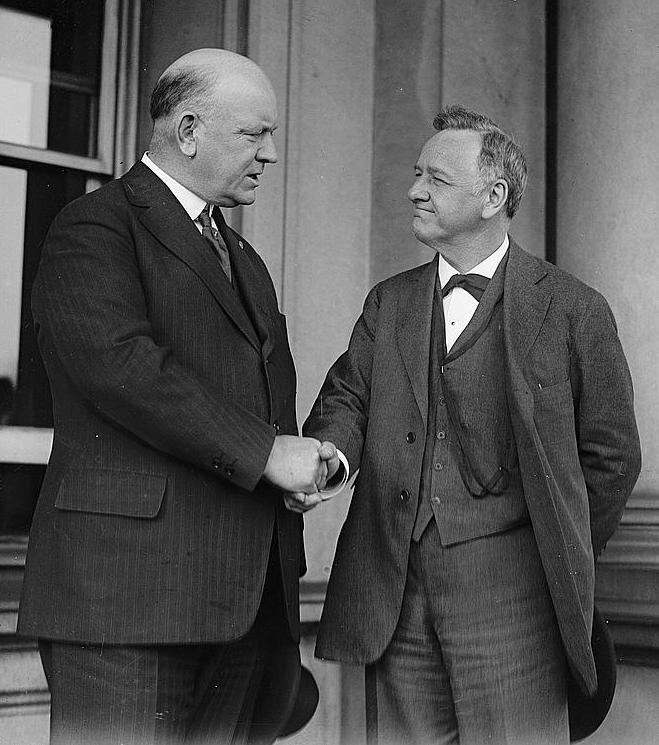
Daniels (right) shaking hands with his successor as Secretary of the Navy, Edwin Denby.

As Secretary of the Navy, he banned the consumption of alcohol aboard U.S. naval vessels in General Order 99 of June 1, 1914. After the end of Prohibition in 1933, the Navy continued to ban alcohol on board ship but allowed limited access to beer for sailors with 45 days or more of service on their records. Limited access to harder alcoholic beverages by officers to be distributed at their discretion was subsequently maintained for use on shore during official leave from onboard duty.

In 1917, Secretary Daniels determined that no prostitution would be permitted within a five-mile radius of naval installations. In New Orleans this World War I directive resulted in the shutting down of brothels in Storyville. It had long-lasting consequences for servicemen and others during subsequent decades.

During World War I, Daniels created the Naval Consulting Board to encourage inventions that would be helpful to the Navy. Daniels asked Thomas Edison to chair the board, as the Secretary was worried that the US was unprepared for the new conditions of warfare and needed new technology. Additionally, Daniels was the first Secretary of the Navy to sponsor naval aviation. He established the first naval air station at the Pensacola Navy Yard, claiming "aircraft must form a large part of our naval force for offensive and defensive operations".

Daniels believed in government ownership of armor-plate factories, and of telephones and telegraphs. At the end of the First World War, he made a serious attempt to have the Navy permanently control all radio transmitters in the United States. If he had succeeded amateur radio would have ended, and it is likely that radio broadcasting would have been substantially delayed.

The Newport Sex Scandal erupted due to a Navy sting operation, overseen by Assistant Secretary of the Navy Franklin D. Roosevelt, that was conducted in 1919. Begun as an attempt to clean up what was seen as "immoral conditions" at Naval Station Newport, it expanded to investigations of the civilian population in Newport. It resulted in the arrests for homosexual activity of some 17 sailors and a prominent Episcopal Navy chaplain, with imprisonment imposed for some. When the tactics used in the sting operation became known, it attracted national news coverage. Congress undertook an investigation, resulting in both Secretary Daniels and Roosevelt being rebuked by a Congressional committee. The report called FDR's behavior "reprehensible," and said that the actions "violated the code of the American citizen and ignored the rights of every American boy who enlisted in the Navy to fight for his country."

Daniels published The Navy and the Nation (1919), which was primarily a collection of war addresses he had made as Secretary of the Navy.

After leaving government service in 1921, Daniels resumed the editorship of The News & Observer. He strongly supported Democrat Franklin D. Roosevelt for president in 1932.

== Ambassador to Mexico ==
President Roosevelt appointed Daniels as United States Ambassador to Mexico, a post he held from 1933 to 1941. Roosevelt expected Daniels to help carry out his "Good Neighbor Policy" in Latin America and, more particularly, to repair the damage to relations between the U.S. and Mexico caused by the U.S. invasion of Mexico during its civil war.

It was a remarkable choice as Daniels was not only an outspoken white supremacist, but had overseen an invasion of the port of Veracruz attempting to sabotage Victoriano Huerta during his time as head of the Navy. A group of Mexicans who saw this invasion as Yankee imperial intervention stoned the U.S. Embassy in protest of his appointment.

=== Relations with the Cárdenas Administration ===
Daniels's speeches and policies while serving as Ambassador to Mexico are believed to have improved U.S.-Mexican relations. He praised a proposed Mexican plan for universal popular education and, in a speech to U.S. consular officials, advised them to refrain from interfering too much in the affairs of other nations.

Daniels also saw the reforms of President Lázaro Cárdenas as analogous to Roosevelt's New Deal. He particularly supported Cardenas's expropriation of large landowners, over the objections of the State Department. Historian Tore Olsson has argued that Daniels's support of Cardenas's agrarian reform "contributed most significantly to the success" of the program and that Daniels wielded "astounding power over the future of agrarian reform". This support also translated into support for the Farm Security Administration back home. Daniels, along with John A. Ferrell, was also instrumental in obtaining support for the Rockefeller Foundation's Mexican Agriculture Program, which influenced the later Green Revolution.

Daniels also encouraged the Roosevelt Administration to take a more conciliatory attitude toward the Cárdenas administration's expropriation of foreign oil holdings, which he believed could not be reversed, and to resist the pressure from U.S. oil companies seeking the imposition of sanctions on Mexico by the U.S. government.

==== Anti-Catholicism ====
American Catholics criticized Daniels for failing to oppose the continuing attacks on the Catholic Church by the Mexican government following the Cristero War. Daniels was a staunch Methodist, and worked with Catholics in the U.S., but had little sympathy for the Church in Mexico. He believed that it represented the landed aristocracy, which stood opposed to his version of liberalism.

In Mexico, the main issue was the government's efforts to shut down Catholic schools; Daniels publicly approved these attacks and praised anti-Catholic Mexican politicians. In a July 1934 speech at the U.S. Embassy, Daniels praised the anti-Catholic efforts that had been led by former president Plutarco Elías Calles:

General Calles sees, as Jefferson saw, that no people can be both free and ignorant. Therefore, he and President Rodriguez, President-elect Cardenas and all forward-looking leaders are placing public education as the paramount duty of the country. They all recognize that General Calles issued a challenge that goes to the very root of the settlement of all problems of tomorrow when he said: 'We must enter and take possession of the mind of childhood, the mind of youth.'

However Daniels also warned Mexicans that they should not be so harsh towards the Church. The issue became less salient as relations between the Mexican government and the Church improved under President Cárdenas, who took office in 1934 and drove Calles into exile.

== Return to North Carolina ==
In 1941, his son, Jonathan, was named a special assistant to Roosevelt. At that time, Daniels resigned his ambassadorial post in Mexico to return to North Carolina due to his wife's poor health; she died in 1943. Upon returning he resumed the editor's post at The News & Observer.

Daniels and his son Jonathan were passengers on Franklin Roosevelt's 1945 funeral train from Raleigh until Roosevelt's burial at his home of Springwood in Hyde Park, New York. The father and son rode the train back to Washington, D.C., in the company of widow Eleanor Roosevelt and the new president, Harry S. Truman.

Daniels published several recollections of his years in public office. In addition to The Navy and the Nation, he wrote Our Navy at War (1922), The Life of Woodrow Wilson (1924), and The Wilson Era (1944). After completing a five-volume autobiography, in which he expressed regret over his race-baiting support for the white-supremacist campaign of the late 19th century (but not for white supremacy itself), Daniels died in Raleigh on January 15, 1948, at the age of eighty-five. He is buried in Historic Oakwood Cemetery of that city.

Daniels divided his shares of the News & Observer among all his children and Jonathan became editor. The family retained control until it sold the paper in 1995.

== Marriage and family ==
Frank A. Daniels II (right) with brother Jonathan W. Daniels (left), sons of Josephus Daniels, in 1915

In 1888, Daniels married Addie Worth Bagley, the granddaughter of former Governor Jonathan Worth and later an American suffragist leader and writer. They had four sons: Josephus, Worth Bagley, Jonathan Worth, and Frank A. Daniels II. Jonathan followed his father into public service, serving as a special assistant and, briefly, White House Press Secretary to President Franklin D. Roosevelt in the 1940s.

Josephus Daniels had a cousin, younger by 11 years, John T. Daniels, the Coast Guard member assigned to the Kill Devil Life-Saving Station in 1903, who took the famous photo of the Wright brothers in humanity's first ever successful piloted airplane flight, with Orville at the controls of the Wright Flyer.

== Legacy and honors ==
- In 1956, the new Daniels Middle School in Raleigh was named after him. On June 16, 2020, the Wake County Board of Education voted unanimously to rescind the naming of the school and to rename it Oberlin Middle School. Daniels Hall on North Carolina State University's main campus was also named after him. On June 22, 2020, the NC State Board of Trustees voted to rename Daniels Hall. Chancellor Randy Woodson said "Josephus Daniels had strong ties to white supremacy and played a leading role in the Wilmington massacre. The building’s name had served as a constant reminder of a shameful part of our state’s history." Until future renovations are completed, the building has been temporarily denoted "Beat Navy Hall" in recognition of the strong partnerships with the US Army and the academic departments within the building. Students and faculty alike simply refer to the building by its street address, 111 Lampe, or simply Lampe for the street it is located on.
- USS Josephus Daniels
- His home, Wakestone, is now a National Historic Landmark. It was used as a Masonic Temple before its demolition in August 2021.
- According to historian John Milton Cooper:

Josephus Daniels epitomized, often simultaneously, much of the best and worst in the post-Civil War South. Lifelong sympathy for the poor and underprivileged led him to champion the causes of public education, organized labor, women's rights, freedom of the press, religious liberty, and democratic government ... Yet at the same time he fully shared, even capitalized upon, the prejudices of his fellow Southern whites ... Despite frequent clashes with party conservatives, Daniels never wavered in his Southern Democratic loyalty, and though his early Negrophobia mellowed decidedly in later years, he declined to question white supremacy ... Daniels broke with [William Jennings] Bryan in the 1920s over the antievolution crusade and the Ku Klux Klan. Similarly in spite of a common attachment to peace, the two men split during World War I. In personality and as a public figure, Daniels combined two sets of contrasting qualities: gentle amiability and combative controversiality; unaffected simplicity of character and outlook and shrewd, skillful management of men and affairs ... On balance, his contributions to the South fell heavily on the side of humanitarianism and progress, and both his newspaper and his sons continued Daniels's example of enlightened, responsible journalism and public service.

A statue of Daniels formerly stood in Nash Square in Raleigh. It was removed on June 16, 2020, after the murder of George Floyd and subsequent widespread civil unrest. Members of the Daniels family approved of the removal.

== In fiction ==
In Harry Turtledove's "Southern Victory" series of alternate history novels, Daniels was US Secretary of the Navy during the timeline's analog of World War I, and the US Navy named a destroyer escort after him during the series's version of World War II.

== Selected works ==
- 1919 — The Navy and the Nation. New York: George H. Doran Company. OCLC 1450710
- 1922 — Our Navy at War. Washington, D.C.: Pictorial Bureau. OCLC 1523367
- 1924 — The Life of Woodrow Wilson, 1856–1924. Philadelphia: Universal Book and Bible House. OCLC 4894794. reprint by Kessinger Publishing, 2004. ISBN 978-0-7661-8631-6; OCLC 81967751
- 1939 — Tar Heel Editor. Chapel Hill: University of North Carolina Press. OCLC 335116
- 1941 — Editor in Politics. Chapel Hill: University of North Carolina Press. OCLC 339245
- 1944 — The Wilson Era: Years of Peace, 1910–1917. Chapel Hill: University of North Carolina Press. OCLC 750810 (1944 edition); OCLC 63786963 (1946 edition)
- 1946 -- The Wilson Era: Years of War and After, 1917–1923, Volume 4. Chapel Hill: University of North Carolina Press.
- 1947 — Shirt-sleeve Diplomat. Chapel Hill: University of North Carolina Press. OCLC 422237

== Notes ==
Government offices
Preceded by George von L. Meyer	United States Secretary of the Navy; March 5, 1913 – March 4, 1921	Succeeded by Edwin Denby
Diplomatic posts
Preceded by J. Reuben Clark, Jr.	U.S. Ambassador to Mexico; March 17, 1933 – November 9, 1941	Succeeded by George S. Messersmith
