= David H. Bagley =

United States Navy admiral

David Harrington Bagley
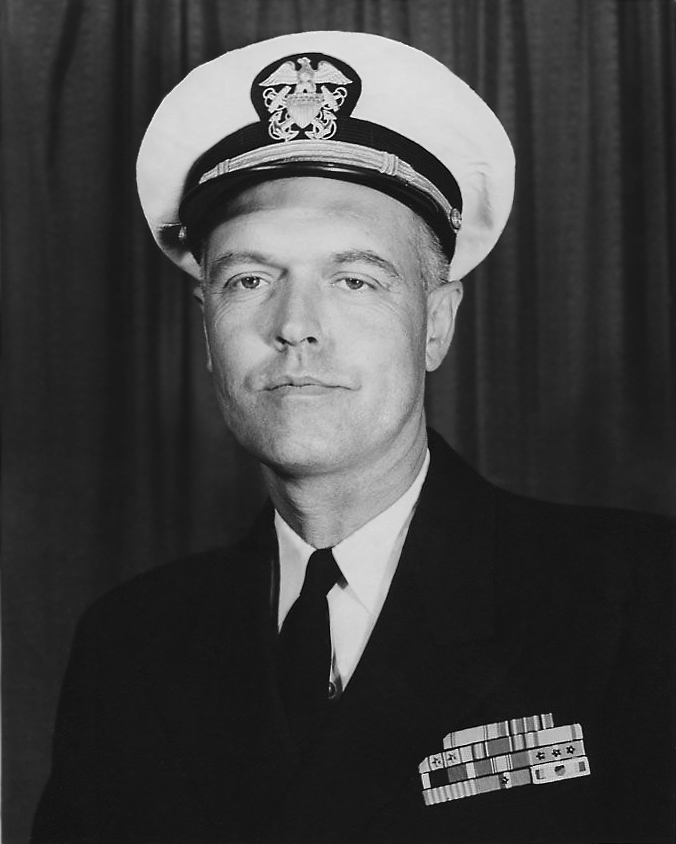
- Born: December 7, 1920; The Hague, Netherlands
- Died: April 7, 1992 (aged 71); Vienna, Virginia, United States
- Burial place: Arlington National Cemetery
- Relatives: Admiral David W. Bagley (father); Admiral Worth H. Bagley (brother); Worth Bagley (uncle); William Henry Bagley (grandfather); Brother Chidananda(son)
- Military career
- Allegiance: United States
- Branch: United States Navy
- Service years: 1943–1977
- Rank: Admiral
- Service number: 0-283295
- Commands: United States Naval Forces Europe; Chief of Naval Personnel; Cruiser-Destroyer Flotilla 9 USS Oklahoma City (CL-91)
- Conflicts: World War II; Korean War; Vietnam War
- Awards: Navy Distinguished Service Medal (2); Legion of Merit (4)

David Harrington Bagley (December 7, 1920 – April 7, 1992) was an admiral in the United States Navy. He was the son of four-star admiral David W. Bagley and brother of Admiral Worth H. Bagley. From 1975 to 1977, Bagley was Commander in Chief of United States Naval Forces Europe. He died of cancer in 1992 and was buried in Arlington National Cemetery.

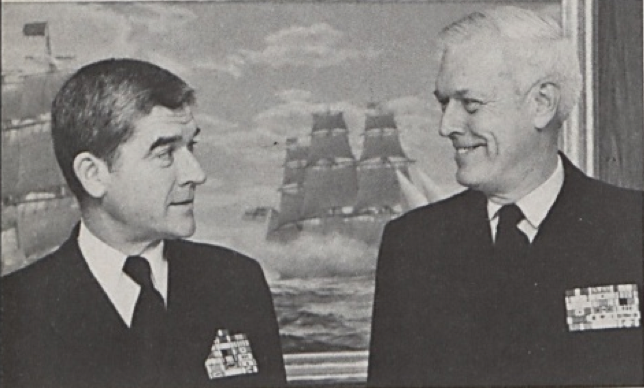
Four-star admirals Worth H. (left) and David H. Bagley.
