= Harold Dale Meyerkord =

United States Navy officer

- Born: October 9, 1937; St. Louis, Missouri, US
- Died: March 16, 1965 (aged 27); Mekong Delta, South Vietnam
- Military career
- Allegiance: United States
- Branch: United States Navy
- Service years: 1960–1965
- Rank: Lieutenant
- Nickname: Dale
- Conflicts: Vietnam War
- Awards: Navy Cross, Bronze Star w/ V, Purple Heart w/ Gold Star, Air Medal

Harold Dale Meyerkord (9 October 1937 – 16 March 1965) was a United States Navy officer who received a posthumous Navy Cross for his actions during a battle in which he was killed during the Vietnam War. He was also the namesake of USS Meyerkord (FF-1058).

== Biography ==
Meyerkord was born on 9 October 1937 at St. Louis, Missouri, to Harold E. Meyerkord and Louise Foley. He was a 1955 graduate of Riverview Gardens High School, received a Bachelor's degree in Political science from the University of Missouri and was a member of the Sigma Alpha Epsilon fraternity. He graduated from U.S. Navy Officer Candidate School at Newport, Rhode Island, on 14 June 1960 and was assigned to heavy cruiser USS Los Angeles (CA-135). He then served as weapons officer on USS Duncan (DD-874). Meyerkord was married to Jane Elizabeth Schmidt and had a daughter, Lynne.

Meyerkord reported to the U.S. Military Assistance Command Vietnam (MACV) in South Vietnam on 13 July 1964. He was senior naval adviser to the South Vietnamese 23rd River Assault Group, responsible for suppressing Vietcong operations in South Vietnam's "rice bowl" during the Vietnam War. The group probed the Mekong Delta waterways, engaging Vietcong guerrillas in operations in which Lieutenant Meyerkord distinguished himself for coolness, resourcefulness, and concern for his men. His radio callsign was "Hornblower", for Horatio Hornblower of the C. S. Forester series of books.

== Navy Cross ==
While leading his assault group into Vietcong‑held territory on 16 March 1965, Lieutenant Meyerkord's patrol was ambushed. Though wounded, he steadfastly returned the enemy's fire until hit again, this time mortally.

Lieutenant Meyerkord's heroism was recognized by posthumous award of the Navy Cross. He was also awarded the Air Medal for completing 20 low-level aerial reconnaissance missions under enemy fire. He received the Purple Heart three times for wounds received in combat.

The President of the United States of America takes pride in presenting the Navy Cross (Posthumously) to Lieutenant Harold Dale Meyerkord (NSN: 0-639933), United States Naval Reserve, for extraordinary heroism while serving with the Naval Advisory Group, United States Military Assistance Command, Republic of Vietnam, and assigned as Naval Advisor to the River Force of the Vietnamese Navy. Directly involved in more than thirty combat operations against enemy aggressor forces, Lieutenant Meyerkord at all times served to inspire all who observed him by his superb leadership and cool courage while under enemy fire. On 30 November 1964, he was instrumental in turning defeat into victory when, under fire, he reconnoitered ahead of friendly forces and discovered that river craft could proceed no farther because of a Viet Cong canal block. He immediately proceeded to set up a shore command post, direct artillery fire, call for medical evacuation helicopters, and call for and direct air strikes. On 13 January 1965, he transferred from a command boat to a small boat, proceeded to a boat grounded in Viet Cong territory, administered first aid to the wounded, and returned to the command boat, all of which took place while he was exposed to constant enemy fire. On 24 January 1965, he assumed direction of a Vietnamese River Force flotilla when the Vietnamese Commander was wounded in an ambush. Later in the action, although wounded himself and facing heavy fire, he continued the fight for almost an hour, until victory was assured. In his final action, on 16 March 1965, Lieutenant Meyerkord lost his life while leading a river sortie into insurgent territory after he had again positioned himself in the leading boat in order to direct operations and set an example for the Vietnamese Naval personnel. Caught in a heavy ambush in which he was wounded by the first fusillade from the Viet Cong, he was reported to have returned their fire at pointblank range until he was again wounded, this time mortally. By his sustained leadership, initiative, and courage throughout these operations, Lieutenant Meyerkord contributed greatly to the United States effort in Vietnam and upheld the highest traditions of the United States Naval Service.

— Navy Cross citation, Navy Department Board of Decorations and Medals

== Honors ==
The U.S. Navy frigate USS Meyerkord (FF-1058), in commission from 1969 to 1991, was named for Harold Meyerkord. Riverview Gardens, his former high school, renamed their football field to Dale Meyerkord Field shortly after his death.
