= USS Meyerkord =

1967 Knox-class frigate

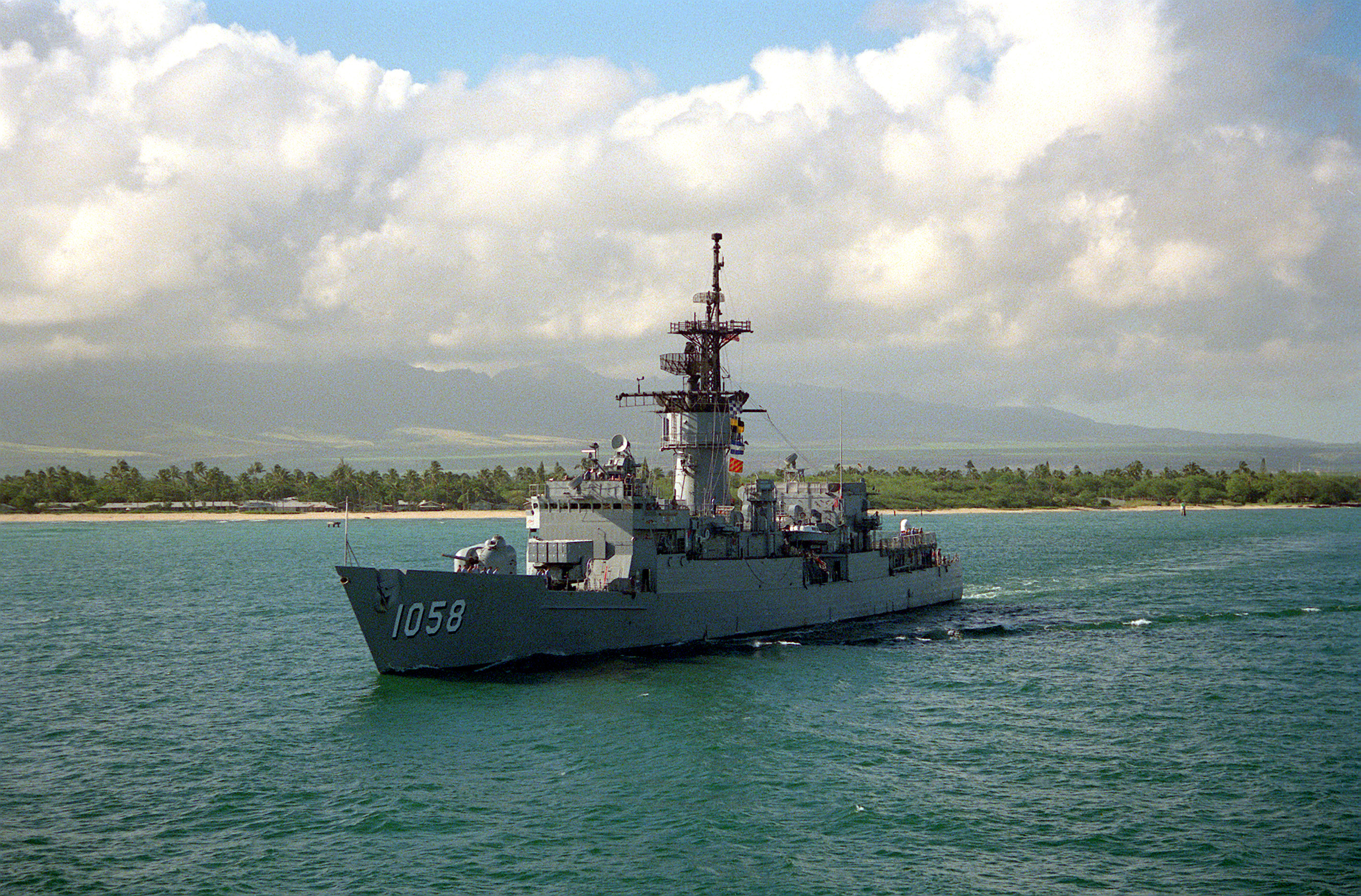
- USS Meyerkord (FF-1058)

History

United States
- Name: Meyerkord
- Namesake: Harold Dale Meyerkord (1937–1965), a Navy Cross recipient killed during the Vietnam War
- Ordered: 22 July 1964
- Builder: Todd Shipyards, Los Angeles Division, San Pedro, California
- Laid down: 1 September 1966
- Launched: 15 July 1967
- Sponsored by: Mrs. Harold Dale Meyerkord and Mrs. Harold E. Meyerkord
- Commissioned: 28 November 1969
- Decommissioned: 14 December 1991
- Stricken: 11 January 1995
- Identification: FF-1058
- Fate: Scrapped beginning on 15 December 2001

General characteristics
- Class & type: Knox-class frigate
- Displacement: 3,160 tons (4,137 full load)
- Length: 438 ft (134 m)
- Beam: 46 ft 9 in (14.25 m)
- Draft: 24 ft 9 in (7.54 m)
- Propulsion: 2 × CE 1200psi boilers; 1 Westinghouse geared turbine; 1 shaft, 35,000 shp (26 MW)
- Speed: over 27 knots (31 mph; 50 km/h)
- Range: 4,500 nautical miles (8,330 km) at 20 knots (23 mph; 37 km/h)
- Complement: 18 officers, 267 enlisted
- Sensors & processing systems: AN/SPS-40 Air Search Radar; AN/SPS-67 Surface Search Radar; AN/SQS-26 Sonar system; Mk68 Gun Fire Control System
- Electronic warfare & decoys: AN/SLQ-32 Electronics Warfare System
- Armament: one Mk-16 8 cell missile launcher for ASROC and Harpoon missiles; one Mk-42 5-inch/54 caliber gun; Mark 46 torpedoes from four single tube launchers; one Mk-25 BPDMS launcher for Sea Sparrow missiles later replaced by one Phalanx CIWS
- Aircraft carried: one SH-2 Seasprite (LAMPS I) helicopter

USS Meyerkord (FF-1058) was a Knox-class frigate in service with the United States Navy from 1969 to 1991. She was scrapped in 2001.

== Construction ==
Meyerkord was named for Lieutenant Harold Dale Meyerkord (1937–1965), a senior naval adviser to South Vietnam who was killed in action during the Vietnam War and received the Navy Cross. The destroyer escort (later frigate) was constructed by Todd Shipyards, Los Angeles Division, San Pedro, California. She was laid down 1 September 1966, and launched on 15 July 1967, sponsored by Mrs. Harold Dale Meyerkord and Mrs. Harold E. Meyerkord, widow and mother of Lieutenant Meyerkord. Meyerkord was commissioned on 28 November 1969.

== Design and description ==
The Knox-class design was derived from the Brooke-class frigate modified to extend range and without a long-range missile system. The ships had an overall length of 438 feet (133.5 m), a beam of 47 feet (14.3 m) and a draft of 25 feet (7.6 m). They displaced 4,066 long tons (4,131 t) at full load. Their crew consisted of 13 officers and 211 enlisted men.

The ships were equipped with one Westinghouse geared steam turbine that drove the single propeller shaft. The turbine was designed to produce 35,000 shaft horsepower (26,000 kW), using steam provided by 2 C-E boilers, to reach the designed speed of 27 knots (50 km/h; 31 mph). The Knox class had a range of 4,500 nautical miles (8,300 km; 5,200 mi) at a speed of 20 knots (37 km/h; 23 mph).

The Knox-class ships were armed with a 5"/54 caliber Mark 42 gun forward and a single 3-inch/50-caliber gun aft. They mounted an eight-round ASROC launcher between the 5-inch (127 mm) gun and the bridge. Close-range anti-submarine defense was provided by two twin 12.75-inch (324 mm) Mk 32 torpedo tubes. The ships were equipped with a torpedo-carrying DASH drone helicopter; its telescoping hangar and landing pad were positioned amidships aft of the mack. Beginning in the 1970s, the DASH was replaced by a SH-2 Seasprite LAMPS I helicopter and the hangar and landing deck were accordingly enlarged. Most ships also had the 3-inch (76 mm) gun replaced by an eight-cell BPDMS missile launcher in the early 1970s.

== Service history ==
In September 1970, Meyerkord participated in her first major exercise, followed by three anti-submarine (ASW) exercises and another major fleet exercise.

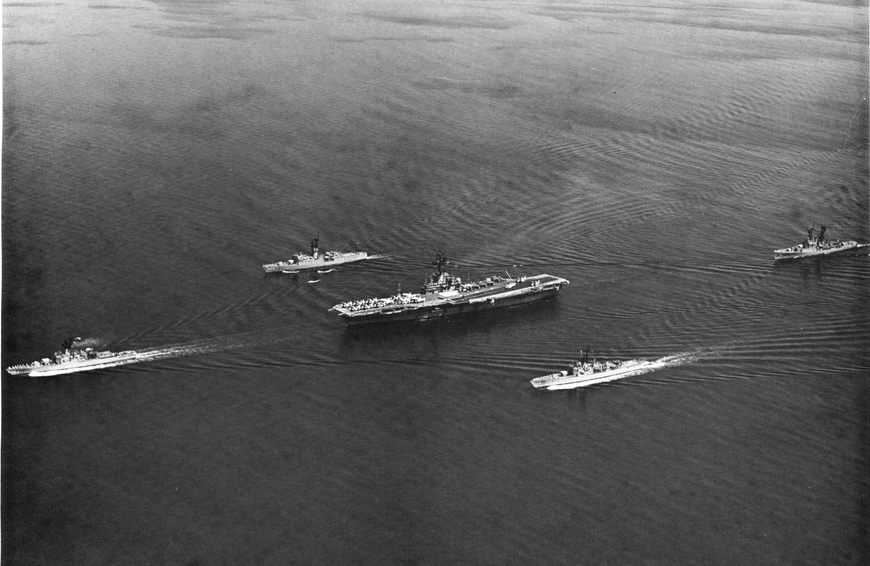
Meyerkord with ASW Group 3 in the Sunda Straits, 1971.

On 11 March 1971, Meyerkord departed Long Beach, California on her first Western Pacific (WESTPAC) deployment, as part of Anti-Submarine Warfare Group Three. Upon her entry into the Southeast Asia combat zone on 3 April 1971, Meyerkord became the first ship named after an American serviceman killed in the Vietnam War to return to act in a supporting role. She participated in an ASW exercise in the Indian Ocean with the ASW group. Meyerkord returned to Long Beach in July 1971.

Meyerkord began her second deployment on 25 July 1972. After transiting to Subic Bay, Meyerkord was independently assigned to Naval Gunfire Support duties. During this seven-month deployment, Meyerkord acted as a mutual support destroyer in three separate assignments involving gunfire support.

On 16 October 1973, Meyerkord began her first regular overhaul in Long Beach. In addition to general maintenance, the ship received several significant alterations. These included modifications to the ship's sonar, the addition of the Basic Point Defense Missile system, and alterations to the hangar to accommodate a crewed helicopter (as opposed to the uncrewed Gyrodyne QH-50 DASH).

Meyerkord reported to her new homeport, San Diego, California, in July 1974. On 3 January 1975, Meyerkord departed San Diego for her third WESTPAC deployment. After arrival at Subic Bay, the ship answered a distress signal from Gulf Banker, a sinking Panamanian registered merchant ship. Meyerkord rescued 31 ship's crew members and monitored Gulf Banker until it sank to ensure it would not become a hazard to navigation. Meyerkord participated in the evacuations of Cambodia and Vietnam as well as fleet towing exercises and a joint exercise with the Royal Thai Navy.

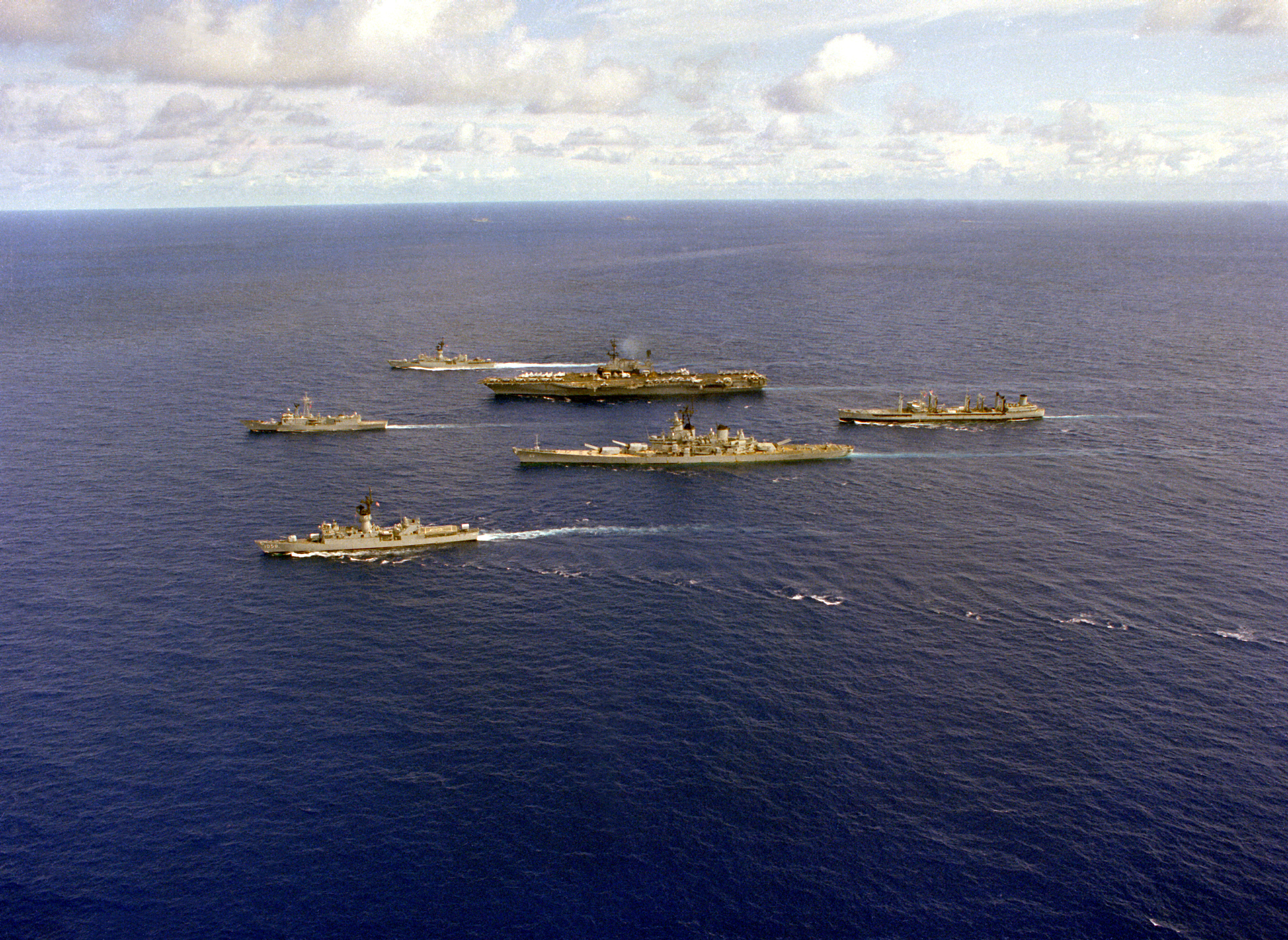
Meyerkord at bottom, with the Midway battlegroup in 1983.

Meyerkord returned to San Diego in August 1975 for maintenance and repair. During November 1975, Meyerkord began an extensive inspection and training cycle in preparation for her next WESTPAC which began 22 May 1976. While deployed, Meyerkord participated in a number of operations which included special surveillance, anti-submarine warfare exercises, naval gunfire exercises, marine support exercises and carrier task group operations. She also made a number of port visits in support of the Navy's Overseas Diplomacy program. Meyerkord returned to San Diego on 21 December 1976.

In 1977, Meyerkord participated in many fleet exercises and port visits to Portland, Oregon, Seattle, Mexico and Canada.

Meyerkord returned to Portland, Oregon in January 1978 to undergo a $13 million, 14-month overhaul which was finished in February 1979. In May 1979, Meyerkord visited the Puget Sound area and participated in the annual Sea Fair.

Meyerkord commenced her fourth WESTPAC in February 1980 with RIMPAC '80. During this deployment, Meyerkord visited Guam, Japan and the Philippines. Meyerkord participated in a search and rescue operation involving a merchant ship and completed the WESTPAC by participating in operation Dakota Run in the Sea of Okhotsk with USS Merrill and USS Joseph Strauss. Meyerkord collided with Sensho Maru in dense fog off Matsuyama Japan in July 1980. Repairs to Meyerkord cost $115,000 and the ship was in port at Yokosuka from 13 July to 5 August 1980 for repairs.

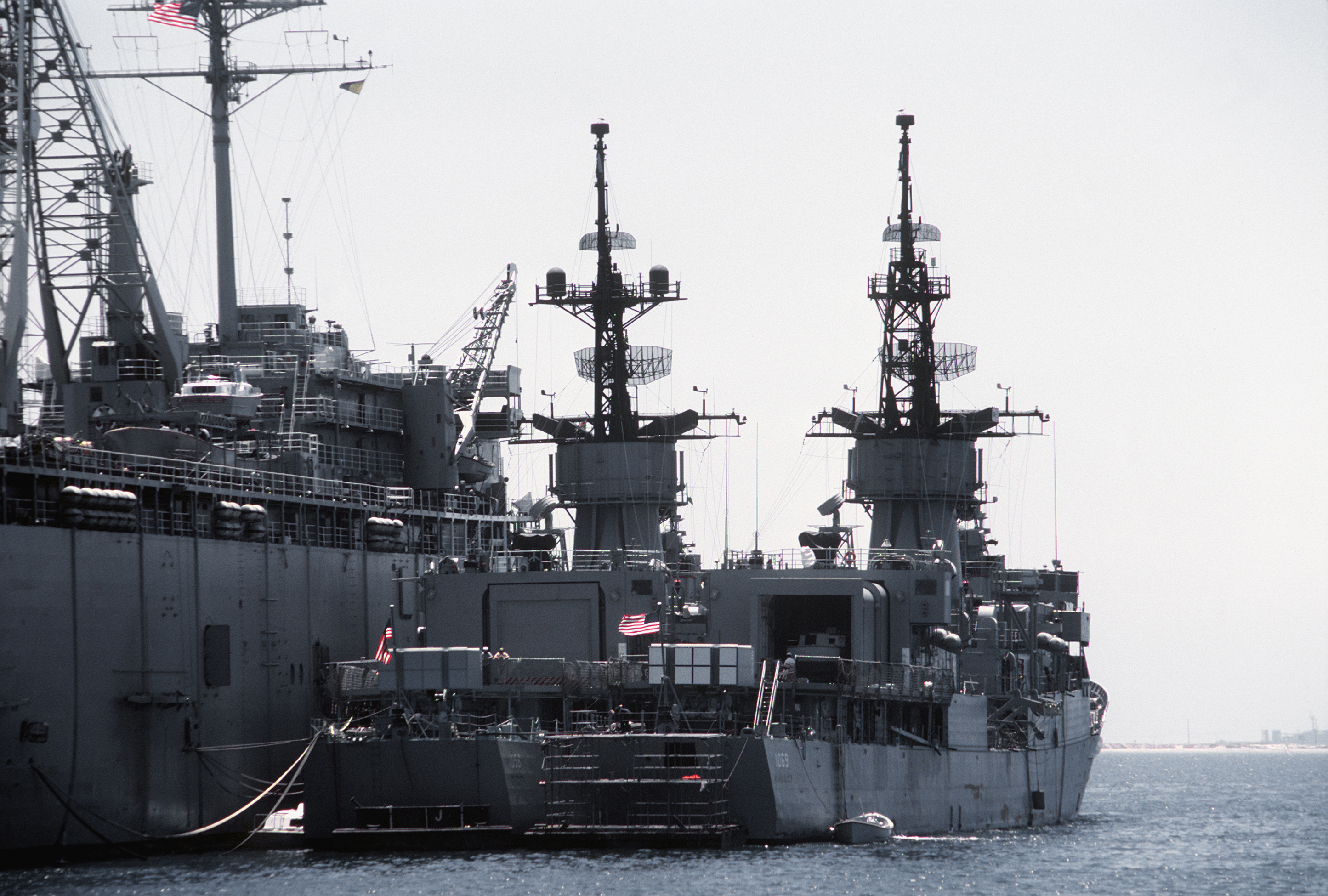
Meyerkord in the center between Samuel Gompers and Bagley.

Meyerkord deployed in October 1981 on her fifth WESTPAC. She visited the Philippines, Mauritius, Australia and Malaysia. Meyerkord was deployed to the Indian Ocean with the Constellation battle group and the John F. Kennedy battle group from December 1981 to April 1982.

On 9 June 1983, Meyerkord deployed on her sixth WESTPAC with USS New Jersey and other Destroyer Squadron 17 ships. World events forced New Jersey to other commitments and sent Meyerkord to the Indian Ocean to escort the Carl Vinson battle group. Upon completion of the Indian Ocean tour, Meyerkord was tasked with the humanitarian and salvage operations at the Korean Air Lines Flight 007 crash site after it was shot down by the Soviet Union. Meyerkord visited Manila, Singapore, Hong Kong and Sasebo during the deployment. Meyerkord returned to San Diego on 12 December 1983 and began preparation for an overhaul scheduled to start in March 1984 at Long Beach.

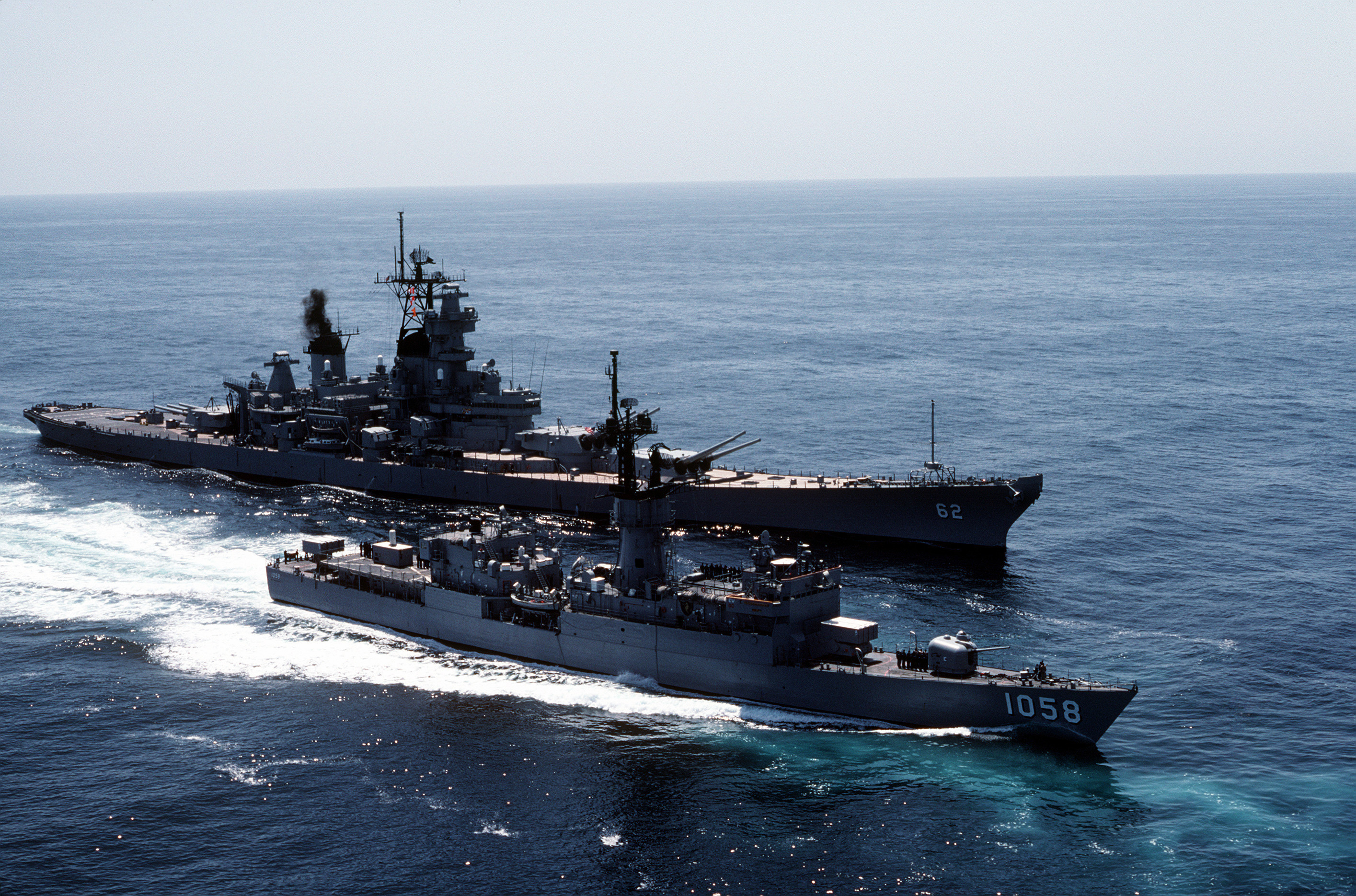
Meyerkord with USS New Jersey in 1983.

In 1984 a minor scandal erupted when it was revealed to US media that a suicidal sailor had been chained inside the helicopter hangar aboard Meyerkord for seven days. This had occurred during the aftermath of the downing of KAL 007 and the Navy stated the suicidal crewmember was a danger to himself and others and could not be medically evacuated immediately due to the urgency of the operations at the time. The sailor was later found guilty of disobeying orders and drug usage and given 30 days confinement with hard labor and a bad conduct discharge.

Sometime between 1984 and 1986, the BPDMS was replaced with Phalanx CIWS.

Meyerkord departed San Diego 12 May 1987 on another WESTPAC. The ship visited Pearl Harbor, Subic Bay, Manila, Yokosuka and Kure, Japan, Pusan, South Korea, Singapore, Albany and Darwin, Australia and Hong Kong. Meyerkord returned to San Diego 12 November 1987.

Meyerkord was transferred to the Naval Reserve Force on 30 September 1989 and reassigned to Treasure Island, San Francisco in March 1990.

Meyerkord was decommissioned on 14 December 1991 and stricken from the Naval Vessel Register on 11 January 1995. Meyerkord was sold for scrapping, with dismantling beginning on 15 December 2001.

== Awards ==
- Vietnam Service Medal, for ten periods in 1971, 1972 and 1973.
- Humanitarian Service Medal, 29-Apr-1975 to 30-Apr-1975, Operation Frequent Wind
- Armed Forces Expeditionary Medal, 29-Apr-1975 to 30-Apr-1975, Operation Frequent Wind
- Meritorious Unit Commendation, 22-Apr-1975 to 30-Apr-1975
- Meritorious Unit Commendation, 14-Oct-1983 to 05-Nov-1983
- Navy "E" Ribbon, 01-Jan-1985 to 30-Jun-1986
- Navy "E" Ribbon, 01-Jan-1988 to 30-Jun-1989
