= William Henry Bagley =

American politician

William Henry Bagley (July 5, 1833 – February 21, 1886) was an American military officer, politician, and newspaperman. He served as clerk of the North Carolina Supreme Court, having been elected January 18, 1869, and holding that position until his death, a little more than 17 years thereafter. He was appointed to the post of superintendent of the United States Mint at Charlotte, but could not accept the appointment as he did not qualify for it. He served as state senator for North Carolina's First Senatorial District.

== Biography ==
Bagley was born in Perquimans County, North Carolina, on 5 July 1833, and was a son of Colonel Willis Bagley.

In 1852, Bagley was elected register of deeds of his native County, and held that position for several years. In 1855, he removed to Elizabeth City, in the adjacent county of Pasquotank, and there engaged in journalistic work as editor of the Sentinel. He also studied law, and was licensed to practice in 1859. In 1860, he was associated in the editorial management of another paper, the State, with James W. Hinton.

Upon the outbreak of the American Civil War, Bagley entered the Confederate service, and was commissioned First Lieutenant of Company A, Eighth North Carolina Regiment, on May 16, 1861. This regiment being sent to join the forces engaged in the defenses around Albemarle and Pamlico Sounds, Bagley was engaged in numerous actions in that vicinity until February 8, 1862, when he was captured by Burnside's expedition against Roanoke Island, where he was stationed.

Shortly after the Eighth Regiment reassembled, Bagley was promoted to the rank of captain, October 25, 1862, and assigned to his former company. He probably did not rejoin his company immediately, as about this time he had been elected state senator from the First Senatorial District, composed of the counties of Pasquotank and Perquimans.

On April 15, 1864, Bagley was commissioned Major of the Sixty-eighth Regiment. He did not remain with this regiment long, however, but resigned on June 11 in the same year. He again became a member of the State Senate in 1864.

In July, 1865, President Andrew Johnson appointed Bagley to the post of superintendent of the United States Mint at Charlotte, but the recipient of this appointment could not qualify as he was unable to take the "iron-clad oath" alleging that he had borne no part in what was then officially designated "the late Rebellion."

On December 15, 1865, Jonathan Worth became Governor of North Carolina. Bagley was appointed private secretary by Governor Worth, and served in that capacity for some time. In 1866, he married the Governor's daughter, Miss Adelaide Worth. One of the children born to this marriage was Ensign Worth Bagley, killed in the War with Spain, and in whose honor a statue now stands in the Capitol Square at Raleigh. William Henry Bagley, second son, was engaged in newspaper work. A third son was Admiral David Worth Bagley, of the Navy, who saw active service. One of Major Bagley's daughters was Addie Worth Bagley Daniels, herself a patriotic welfare worker.

Bagley held highest honors in the Independent Order of Odd Fellows. He was initiated into this order in 1857 as a member of Achoree Lodge, No. 14, of Elizabeth City. In 1865, he transferred his membership to Seaton Gales Lodge, No. 64, of Raleigh, and became a member of McKee Encampment, No. 15, in the same city. He represented the Grand Lodge of North Carolina in the Grand Lodge of the United States (afterwards known as the Sovereign Grand Lodge) from 1874 until 1886, and was Grand Master of the Grand Lodge of North Carolina from May 1873 until May 1874.

Bagley's death occurred at his home in Raleigh on February 21, 1886. Funeral services were held two days later at the First Presbyterian Church in Raleigh. In attendance were the officers of the State Departments, the Justices and officers of the Supreme Court, the Raleigh Bar in a body, numerous representations of Odd Fellows, among others.

== Bibliography ==
- North Carolina Bar Association (1919). Centennial Celebration of the Supreme Court of North Carolina, 1819–1919, by the North Carolina Bar Association (Public domain ed.). Mitchell Printing Company. p. 59.
