= Worth Bagley =

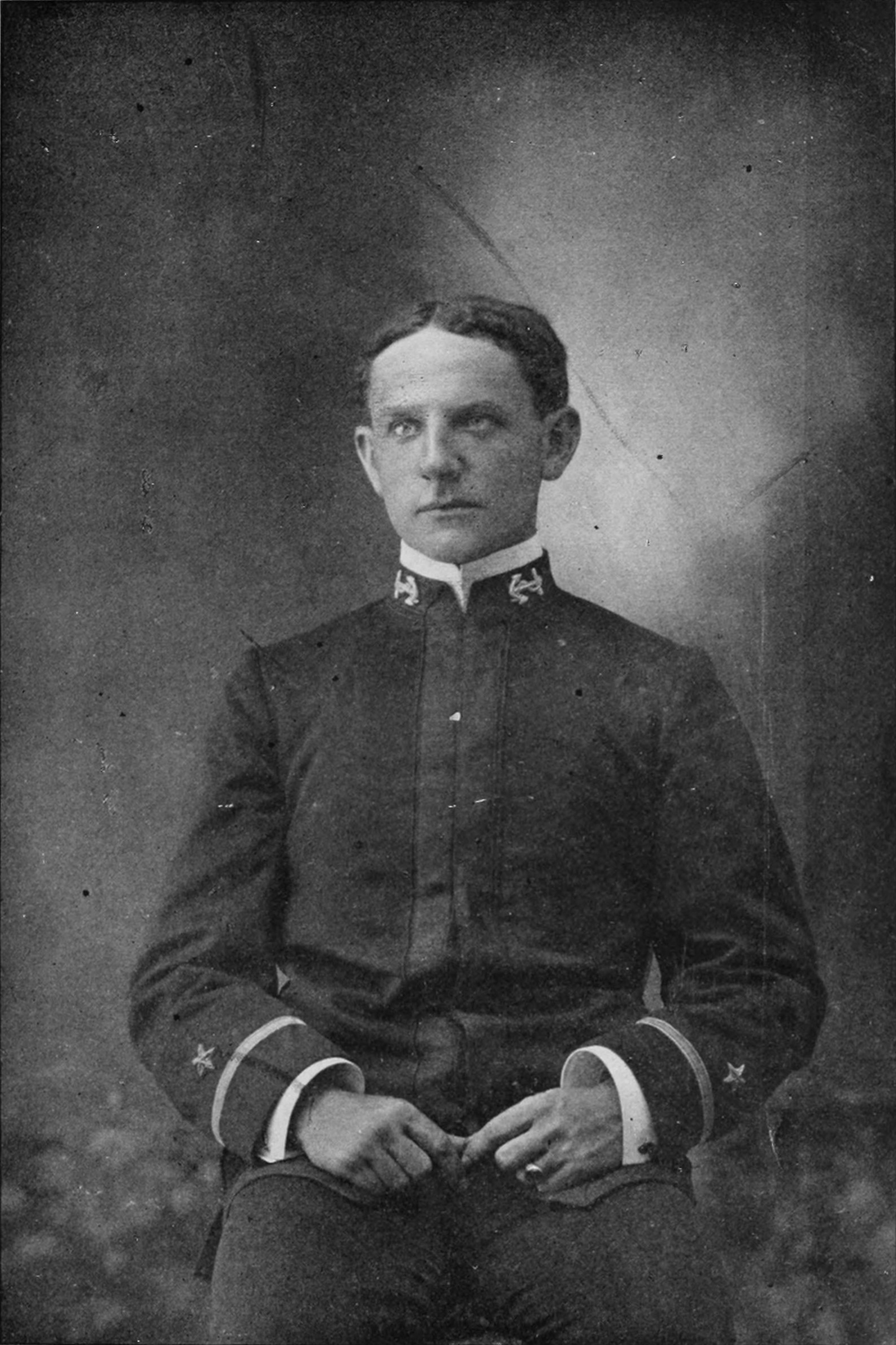
- Born: April 6, 1874; Raleigh, North Carolina
- Died: May 11, 1898 (aged 24) off Cárdenas, Cuba
- Military career
- Allegiance: United States of America
- Branch: United States Navy
- Service years: 1895-98
- Rank: Ensign
- Conflicts: Spanish–American War: Battle of Cárdenas†

Worth Bagley (April 6, 1874 – May 11, 1898) was a United States Navy officer during the Spanish–American War, distinguished as the only U.S. naval officer killed in action during that war.

== Biography ==
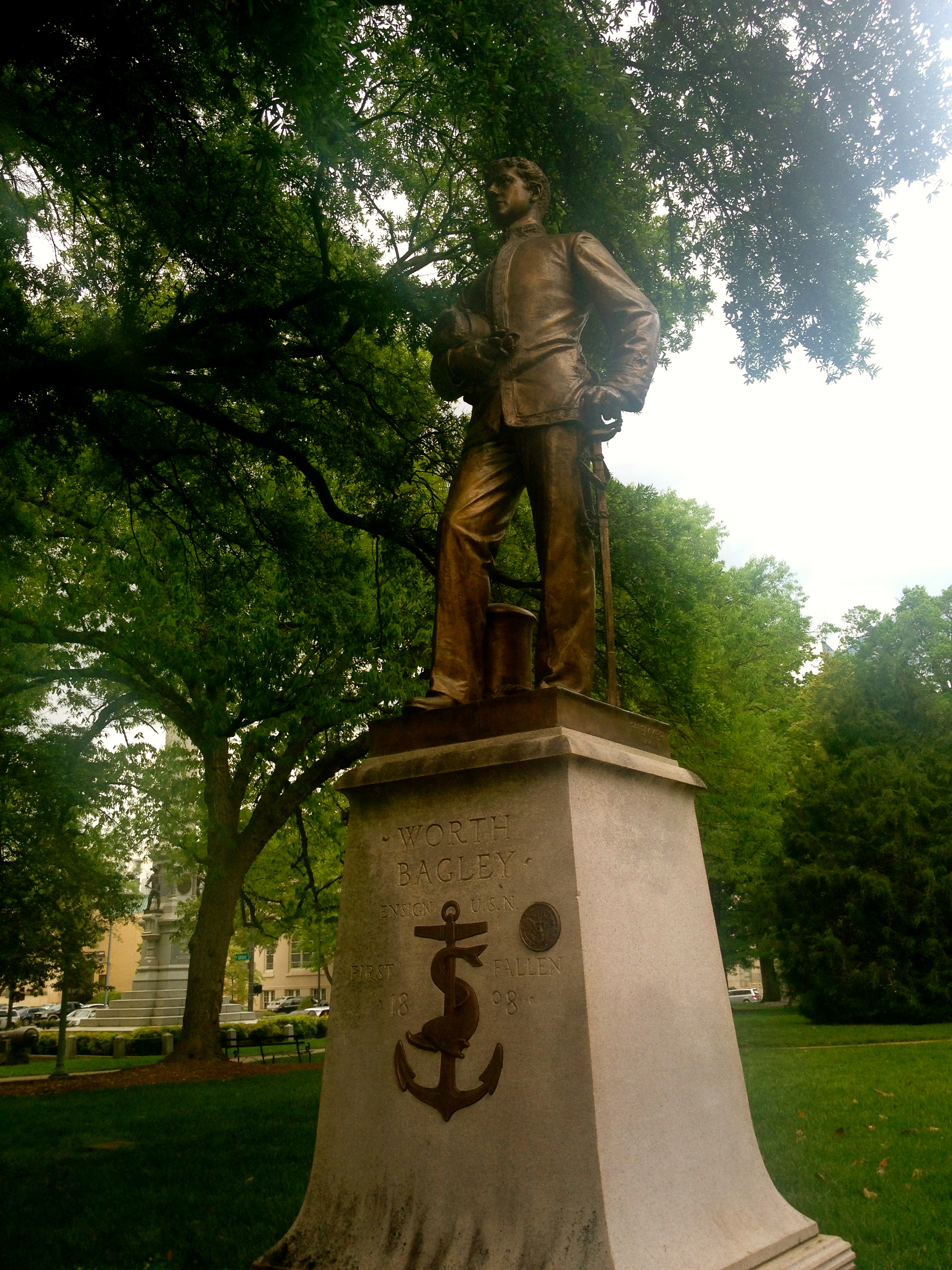
Worth Bagley Statue, Raleigh, North Carolina

Born in Raleigh, North Carolina, a son of William Henry Bagley, he graduated from the United States Naval Academy in 1895. After serving two years on USS Montgomery, USS Texas, and USS Maine, he was made ensign, July 1, 1897. In November he was appointed inspector of the new torpedo-boat, USS Winslow and when she went into commission on December 28, he was assigned as her executive officer under Lieutenant John Baptiste Bernadou.

In April 1898, the Winslow was with the fleet, mobilized for operations in Cuban waters. On the morning of May 11 the ship went with USRC Hudson and USS Wilmington to force the entrance to the harbor of Cárdenas. She was fired upon by the Spanish gunboat Antonio López, and immediately there was a general engagement. The Winslow was soon disabled, and was with difficulty hauled out of range of the Spanish guns by Hudson. Just as the engagement ended, Ensign Bagley and four sailors were killed by a shell.

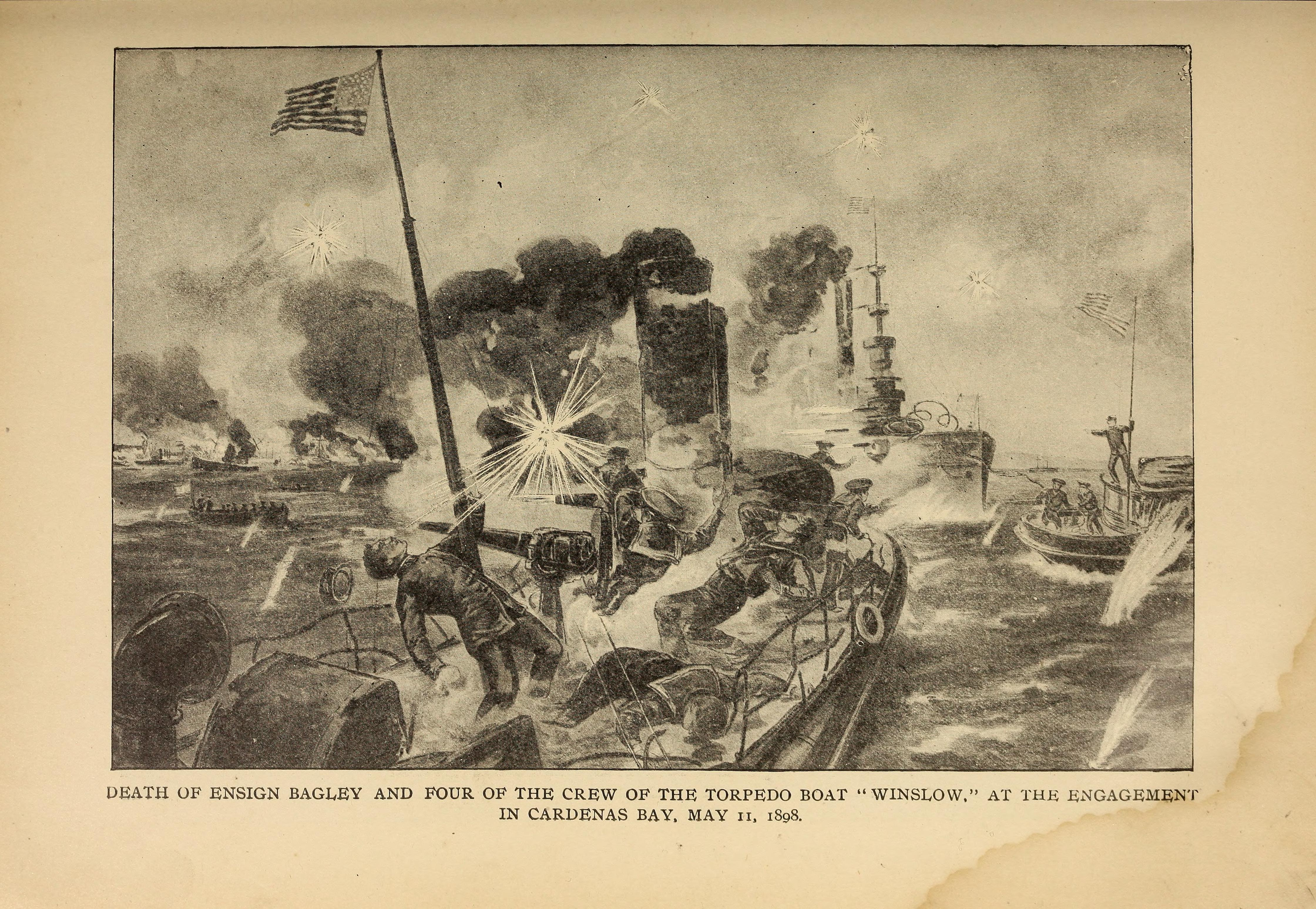
Shell strikes the boat

== Namesakes ==
The first three U.S. Navy ships named USS Bagley, USS Bagley (TB-24), USS Bagley (DD-185), and USS Bagley (DD-386), were named for Ensign Worth Bagley. The fourth, USS Bagley (FF-1069), honors both Worth Bagley and his brother, Admiral David W. Bagley.

== Attribution ==
From the 1901 Encyclopaedia of United States History
