= David W. Bagley =

United States naval officer

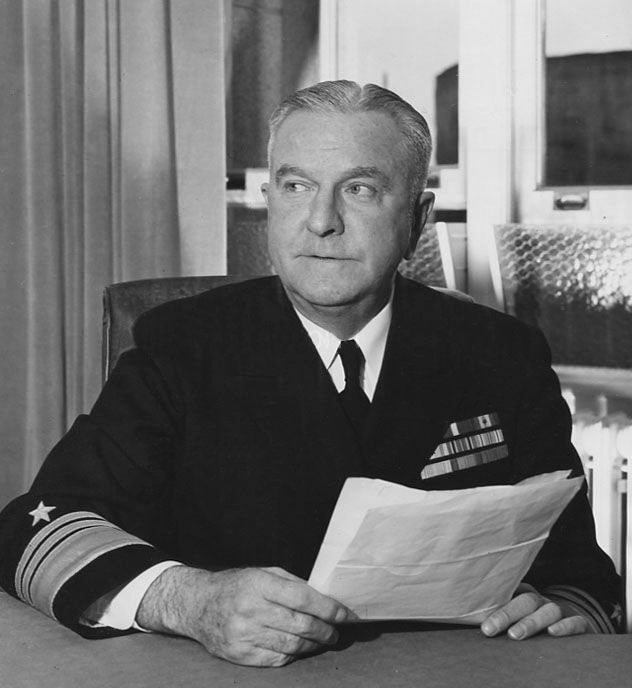
- Vice Admiral David W. Bagley
- Born: January 8, 1883; Raleigh, North Carolina, U.S.
- Died: May 24, 1960 (aged 77); San Diego, California, U.S.
- Military career
- Allegiance: United States
- Branch: United States Navy
- Service years: 1904–1946
- Rank: Admiral
- Commands: 11th Naval District; Western Sea Frontier; Hawaiian Sea Frontier; 14th Naval District; Battleship Division 2 Mare Island Navy Yard; Destroyer Squadron 20; USS Pensacola (CA-24); Destroyer Division 35; Destroyer Division 32; USS Reno (DD-303); USS Lea (DD-118); USS Jacob Jones (DD-61); USS Drayton (DD-23)
- Conflicts: World War I: Atlantic U-boat Campaign; World War II: Pacific War
- Awards: Navy Distinguished Service Medal; Legion of Merit

David Worth Bagley (January 8, 1883 – May 24, 1960) was an admiral in the United States Navy during World War II. He was also the brother of Ensign Worth Bagley, the only United States Navy officer killed in action during the Spanish–American War, and the father of Admirals David H. Bagley and Worth H. Bagley, and CIA officer Tennent H. Bagley.

== Early life and career ==
Born in Raleigh, North Carolina, Bagley was the son of Major William Henry Bagley and Adelaide Ann Worth.

Bagley attended North Carolina State College in 1898 and 1899 before entering the United States Naval Academy in 1900. After graduating on February 4, 1904, he went to sea in USS Missouri (BB-11) attached to the North Atlantic Fleet. In December 1905, Passed Midshipman Bagley was reassigned to the Asiatic Fleet and served successively in the USS Concord (PG-3) and USS West Virginia (ACR-5). While in Concord, he was commissioned ensign on February 2, 1906. He was detached from West Virginia in March 1907 and, the following year, reported on board USS Rhode Island (BB-17) of the Atlantic Fleet and made the voyage around the world in her with the Great White Fleet. In April 1909, he left Rhode Island and went to the General Electric Co. in Schenectady, New York, for a year of instruction. He then became aide and flag lieutenant to the Commander, 2nd Division, Atlantic Fleet, in April 1910.

After a similar tour of duty on the staff of the Commander in Chief, Asiatic Fleet, and a two-month furlough, Bagley reported for duty at the Naval Academy in September 1912. Two years later, Bagley returned to sea as first lieutenant in USS Michigan (BB-27) serving with the Atlantic Fleet. He got his first command in September 1915 when he took over USS Drayton (DD-23).

== World War I ==
During the first month of 1917, Bagley moved from Drayton to USS Jacob Jones (DD-61). By May 1917, he and his ship were conducting antisubmarine patrols and convoy escort missions in the western approaches to the British Isles. Later, his area of operations widened to include the Irish Sea and the English Channel.

On December 6, 1917, Bagley conned his ship out of Brest harbor. At about 1621 that afternoon, the watch spied a torpedo wake. The destroyer maneuvered to avoid the torpedo, but in vain. It struck the ship's starboard side and pierced the fuel oil tank. Though Bagley and his crew worked frantically to save the ship, it went down within eight minutes, carrying 64 crewmen with it. Bagley and 37 others made it into the icy water in boats and on rafts, and, thanks to the humanitarian gesture by Kapitänleutnant Hans Rose, the U-boat commander who radioed their location to Queenstown, they were all picked up by the 8th. Bagley earned the Navy Distinguished Service Medal for his part in handling the situation.

Bagley returned to the United States after the sinking of Jacob Jones and became the prospective commanding officer of USS Lea (DD-118) then under construction at the Philadelphia Navy Yard. He put her into commission on October 2, 1918, but commanded her only until January 1919 when he became the American port officer at Rotterdam in the Netherlands with additional duty as the assistant naval attaché in the American legation at The Hague.

== Interwar years ==
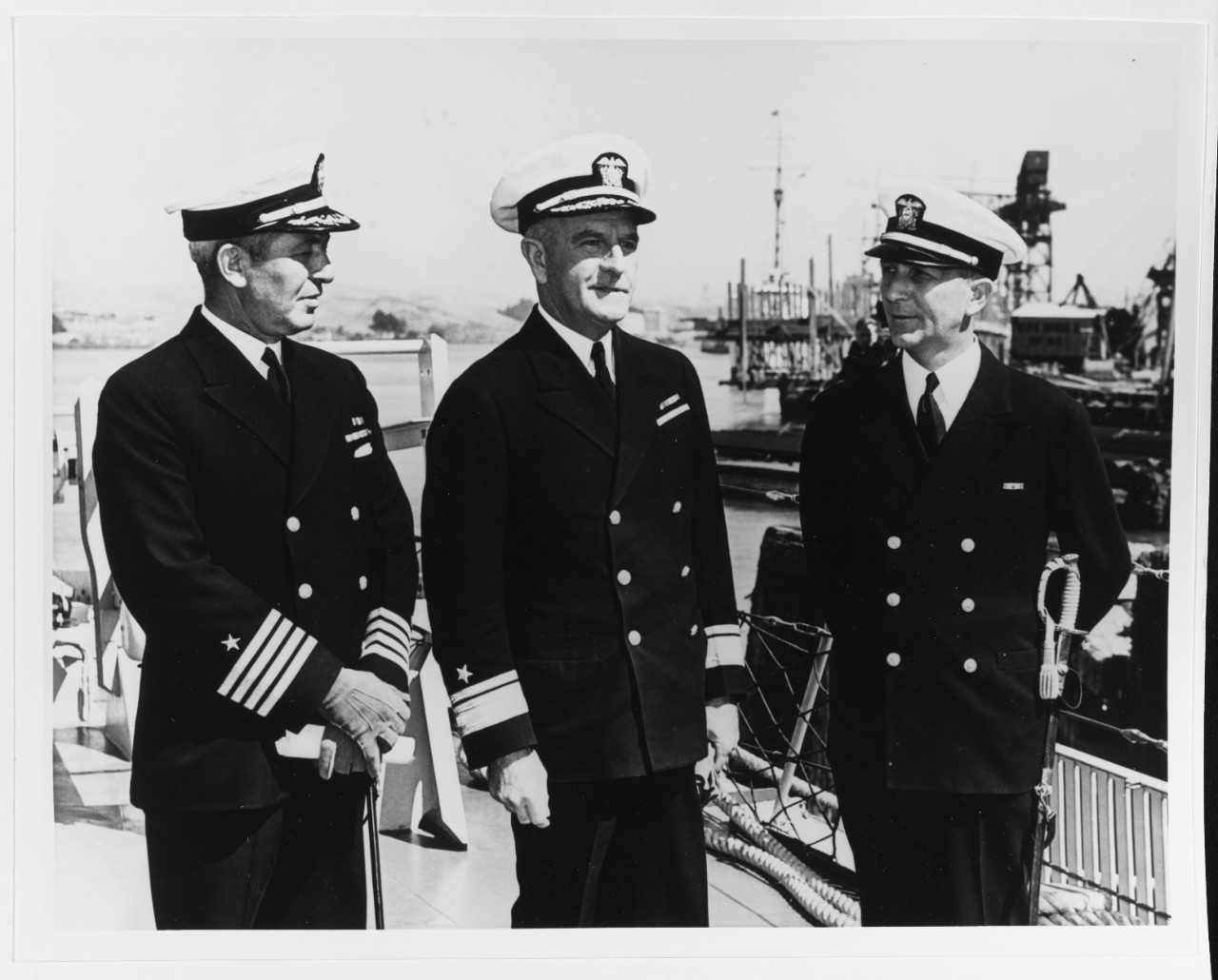
Commissioning ceremony of destroyer USS McCall at Mare Island Navy Yard in June 1938. Captain James L. Kauffman, Captain of the Yard (left) with Bagley (center), Commandant of the Yard and Lieutenant Commander John Whelchel, commanding officer of McCall.

Bagley later served as naval attaché before returning to the United States in December 1921 for a tour of duty ashore in the Office of Naval Intelligence. In March 1922, Bagley returned to sea in command of USS Reno (DD-303) and as Commander, Destroyer Division 32, Pacific Fleet. He transferred to command of Division 35, Destroyer Squadrons, Battle Fleet, in August 1923. Bagley went ashore again in May 1924 for another two‑year tour of duty at the Naval Academy. At the end of the academic year in 1926, he left the academy to become chief of staff to the Commander, Naval Forces, Europe, embarked in USS Memphis (CL-13). In April 1927, Bagley moved to the 9th Naval District as the assistant (later changed to chief of staff) to the commandant with temporary additional duty as acting commanding officer of the Naval Training Station, Great Lakes.

Bagley returned to sea in December 1931 as the commanding officer of heavy cruiser USS Pensacola (CA-24), then serving in the Atlantic with Cruiser Division 4, Scouting Fleet. That assignment lasted until May 1933 when Bagley was called to Washington, D.C., for duty in the Bureau of Navigation. He later became assistant bureau chief.

In May 1935, orders sent Bagley to Newport, Rhode Island, to attend the Naval War College. Upon completing the senior course, he remained there as a member of the staff. Next came a year of duty as Commander, Destroyer Squadron 20, Destroyers, Scouting Fleet. From July 1937 to May 1938, he served as Commander Minecraft, Battle Force. While in that position, he was promoted to flag rank to date from April 1, 1938. In May of that year, Rear Admiral Bagley began a 32‑month tour of duty as Commandant, Mare Island Navy Yard.

== World War II ==
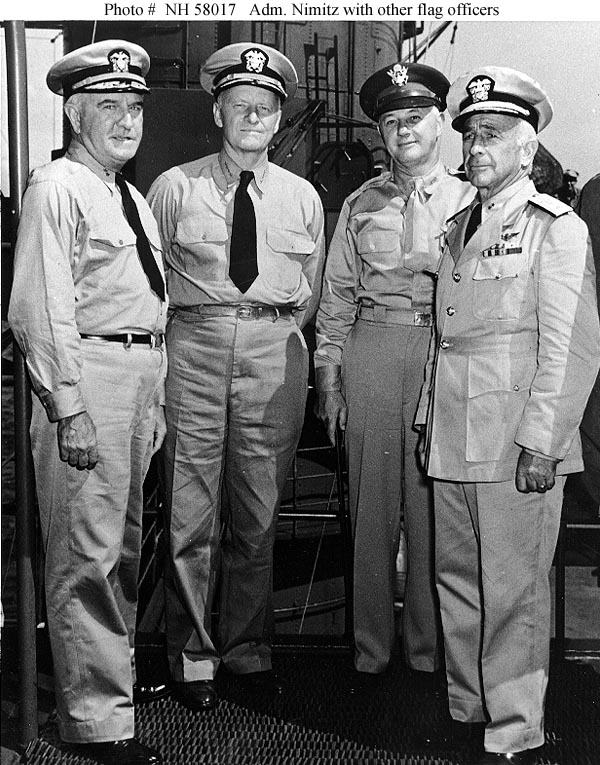
David W. Bagley, on left, with, from left to right, Fleet Admiral Chester W. Nimitz, Major General Delos C. Emmons, and Rear Admiral Aubrey Fitch

At the beginning of 1941, Bagley broke his flag in USS Tennessee (BB-43) as Commander, Battleship Division 2. He was serving in that command billet when his flagship was slightly damaged on December 7, 1941, during the Japanese air raid on Pearl Harbor.

On April 4, 1942, Bagley relieved Rear Admiral Claude C. Bloch as Commandant, 14th Naval District, and Commander, Hawaiian Sea Frontier, and he served in that capacity until January 1943. On February 1, 1943, he assumed command of the Western Sea Frontier and, on March 30, 1943, added the duties of Commandant, 11th Naval District. He held the latter office only until January 1944, but continued to head the Western Sea Frontier until the following fall. Promoted to vice admiral to date from February 1, 1944, he was relieved of duty as Commander, Western Sea Frontier, on November 17, 1944. Eleven days later, Vice Admiral Bagley returned to Oahu and resumed duty as Commandant, 14th Naval District, and served in that position until ordered to Washington on July 25, 1945. On August 20, Bagley reported for duty in the Office of the Chief of Naval Operations and served on the International Defense Board, the United States-Mexican Defense Commission, and the Permanent Joint Board on Defense.

== Retirement and death ==
Bagley was relieved of all active duty on March 22, 1946, and was placed on the retired list with the rank of admiral on April 1, 1947. Admiral Bagley died at the Naval Hospital, San Diego, California, on May 24, 1960.

== Namesakes ==
The first three vessels named USS Bagley—Torpedo Boat No. 24, Destroyer No. 185, and DD-386—were named for Ensign Worth Bagley. The fourth, DE-1069, honors both Worth Bagley and his brother, Admiral David W. Bagley. The Bagley Amphitheater at Barbers Point, TH was completed 1 Apr 1945 and commissioned 6 Apr 1945 with seating capacity 7,200. Barbers Point Station commemorated its 3rd anniversary. Guests included Admiral Bagley, Governor Ingram Stainbackof the Territory of Hawaii, Brigadier General Littleton W. T. Waller Jr., USMC, and Commodore J. L. Austen.
