= United States Naval Forces Europe and Africa =

Service component command of the United States Navy

United States Naval Forces Europe and Africa (NAVEUR-NAVAF)
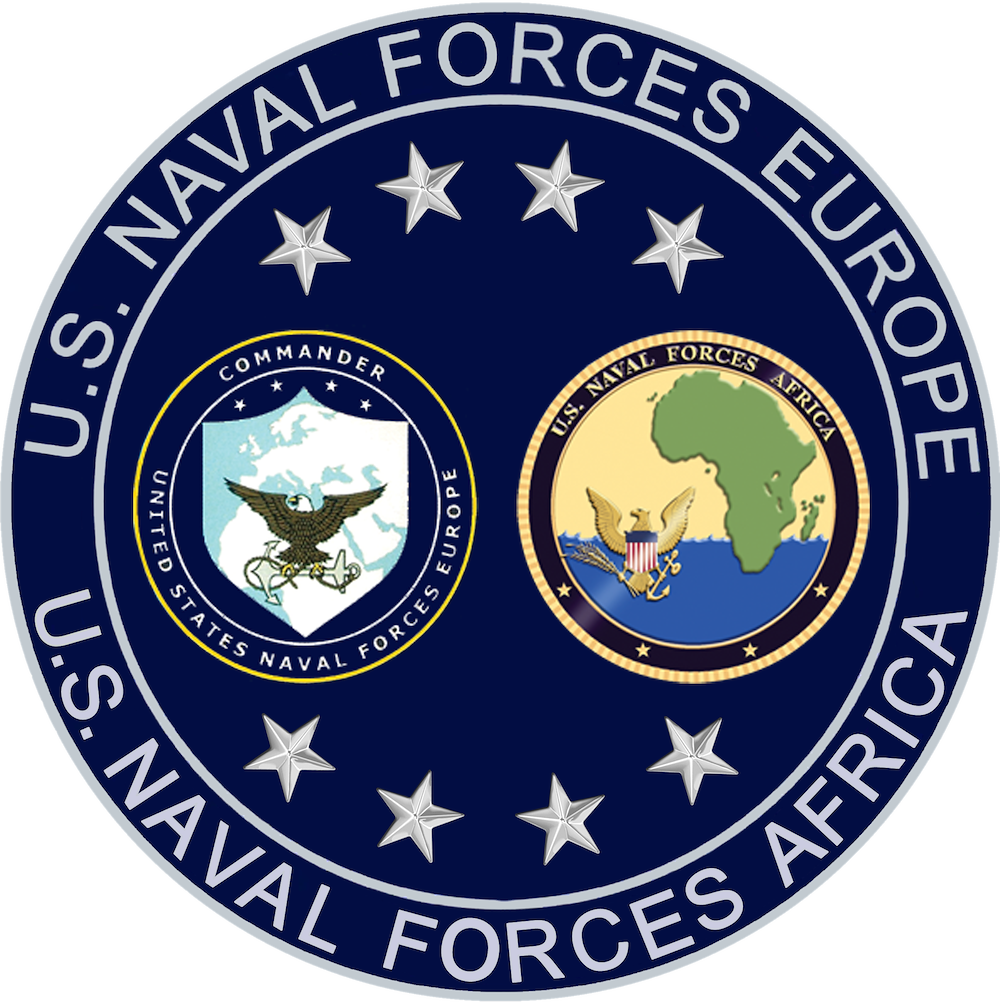
- Active: 1940s–present
- Country: United States
- Branch: United States Navy
- Type: Component command NATO Command
- Part of: United States European Command & United States Africa Command
- Headquarters: Naval Support Activity Naples
- Website: c6f.navy.mil

Commanders
- Commander: Admiral George Wikoff; Commander, CNE-CNA; Commander, Joint Force Command Naples (JFC)

- Deputy Commander: Vice Admiral Jeffrey T. Anderson; Deputy Commander, CNE-CNA; Commander, U.S. Sixth Fleet
- Fleet Master Chief: FLTCM Lateef Compton

The United States Naval Forces Europe and Africa (NAVEUR-NAVAF), is the United States Navy component command of the United States European Command and United States Africa Command. Prior to 2020, NAVEUR-NAVAF was previously referred to as United States Naval Forces Europe – Naval Forces Africa and sometimes referred to as United States Naval Forces Europe – Africa.

Naval Forces Europe and Africa provides overall command, operational control, and coordination of U.S. Naval Forces in the European and African Command area of responsibility. As the Navy component in Europe, the commander of U.S. Naval Forces Europe and Africa, plans, conducts, and supports naval operations in the European theater during peacetime, contingencies, in general war and as tasked by Commander, U.S. European Command. NAVAF works with European, African, and South American governments, including in the disruption of militant networks, deterrence of illicit trafficking, and against piracy and maritime crime.

With its headquarters now at Naval Support Activity Naples, Naval Forces Europe and Africa directs all its naval operations through Commander, United States Sixth Fleet co-located in Naples, Italy, and support activities ashore through Commander, Navy Region Europe, Africa, and Southwest Asia (CNREURAFSWA), also headquartered in Naples.

Naval Forces Europe and Africa is commanded by Admiral George Wikoff, who also serves as NATO's Commander, Allied Joint Force Command Naples. The deputy commander is currently Vice Admiral Jeffrey T. Anderson, who concurrently serves as the Sixth Fleet commander.

== History ==
The earliest presence of U.S. Navy forces in Europe was the Mediterranean Squadron, the European Squadron following the American Civil War, the forces were combined as part of the North Atlantic Fleet in 1906. In 1917, United States Naval Forces Operating in European Waters developed as a command under the leadership Admiral William S. Sims to oversee the European aspects of United States Navy operations during World War I. His principal subordinates were Rear Admirals Henry B. Wilson in France and Albert P. Niblack at Gibraltar.

Following the cessation of hostilities and the Allied occupation of Turkey, Rear Admiral Mark L. Bristol was sent to Istanbul as Senior Naval Officer Turkey, commanding the U.S. Naval Detachment in Turkish Waters. Bristol arrived in Istanbul on 28 January 1919, and raised his flag on USS Scorpion (PY-3). In August 1919 Bristol also received the diplomatic appointment of U.S. High Commissioner, responsible to the State Department for diplomatic matters in Turkey. In his naval capacity Bristol was responsible to Commander, U.S. Naval Forces, European Waters. In May 1920, USS Pittsburgh (CA-4), flagship of Vice Admiral Harry S. Knapp, Commander, U.S. Naval Forces, European Waters, accompanied by USS Cole (DD-155), evacuated a number of American naval and relief personnel from the Caucasus. In September 1920, the flagship Pittsburg ran aground in the Baltic sea off Libau and returned to the United States for repairs. From January 1921 until April 1922, Vice Admiral Albert P. Niblack served as Commander, U.S. Naval Forces, European Waters. In October 1922, Pittsburgh returned to the Mediterranean and became flagship for two of Niblack's successors as Commander-in-Chief, U.S. Naval Forces European Waters, Admiral Philip Andrews in 1924–1925 and Vice-Admiral Roger Welles in 1925–1926.

At some point after 1926, Naval Forces, European Waters, went into abeyance. Later, in March 1942, the duties of the existing Special Naval Observer London were expanded to command naval forces. Commander, Naval Forces, Europe was established to maintain Navy bases in the United Kingdom and to report intelligence and research data being provided by Allied intelligence organizations. Numerous liaison channels were opened with the British Government and with governments in exile. The command also assisted in the planning and preparation of the invasions of North Africa and France. By 1944 the headquarters had been established at 20 Grosvenor Square, in central London. The building was only vacated by the Navy when the headquarters moved to Italy in 2009.

When Admiral Harold R. Stark became COMNAVEUR in April 1942, he was given the additional duties as Commander, United States Twelfth Fleet. The fleet, which operated in European waters, consisted of one battleship, two cruisers, an aircraft carrier and six destroyers.

By autumn of 1945, the chief function of the U.S. Navy in the occupied countries was completed; enemy naval forces had been disarmed, war material had been located and accounted for, and harbors had been reopened and were in operation. As operational emphasis changed and the geographical area expanded, the command's title was changed to more specifically define the Navy's role. In November 1946, COMNAVEUR became COMNELM (Commander, U.S. Naval Forces, Eastern Atlantic and Mediterranean) and six months later, in April 1947, the title was changed, this time to Commander in Chief, U.S. Naval Forces, Eastern Atlantic and Mediterranean (CINCNELM). A Northern European Force of five to six ships (cruisers and destroyers) were active from 1946 to 1956.

Missouri visited Turkey amid the Turkish Straits crisis of 1946–48.

Admiral Robert B. Carney became CINCNELM in December 1950. In June 1951, he assumed additional duty as Commander-in-Chief, Allied Forces Southern Europe (CINCSOUTH), and the CINCNELM Headquarters was moved from London to Naples. In June 1952, the two commands were separated: CINCNELM Headquarters returned to London and Admiral Jerauld Wright became CINCNELM and Admiral Carney remained in Naples as CINCSOUTH.

Wright became the Commander-in-Chief effective 14 June 1952. CINCELM was organized into the following subordinate commands:

- Northern European Force (CTF 101) — Rear Admiral Robert B. Pirie, Chief of Staff to CINCNELM
- Fleet Air, Eastern Atlantic and Mediterranean (CTF-122) — Rear Admiral E.A. Cruise
- Military Sea Transport Service, Eastern Atlantic and Mediterranean (CTF-123) — Rear Admiral C.F. Chillingsworth
- U.S. Naval Forces, Germany (CTF-104) — Rear Admiral H.E. Orem
- Middle Eastern Force (CTF-109) — Rear Admiral Wallace M. Beakley
- U.S. Sixth Fleet — Vice Admiral J.H. Cassady

Wright's operational control over the Sixth Fleet proved to be a source of friction with Admiral Lord Louis Mountbatten, RN, NATO's Commander-in-Chief Allied Forces Mediterranean (CINCAFMED). Mountbatten felt that the Sixth Fleet should be assigned to his command while Wright wanted to maintain control of the fleet, particularly its nuclear-armed aircraft carriers, pursuant to both U.S. Navy policy and the Atomic Energy Act of 1946. The dispute tested the diplomatic skills of both men. CINCNELM forces participated in NATO Operation Mariner and Operation Weldfast exercises during 1953, and units of the Sixth Fleet did participate in NATO exercises while staying under U.S. control.

As CINCNELM, Wright maintained strong diplomatic ties with allies within his area of responsibility. He made a 14-day goodwill trip to the Middle East that culminated with a courtesy call with the newly crowned King Saud bin Abdul Aziz in Jidda, Saudi Arabia. Later, Wright attended the coronation ceremonies of King Hussein of Jordan in May 1953.

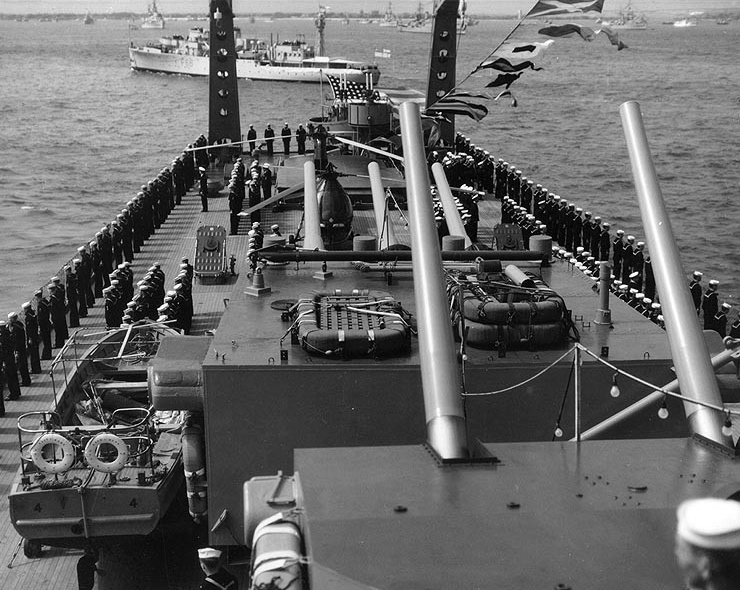
USS Baltimore at Coronation Naval Review – Spithead (1953)

In June 1953, Wright served as the senior U.S. Navy representative at the coronation pageant of Queen Elizabeth II, including flying his flag from the heavy cruiser USS Baltimore during the Coronation Naval Review of Spithead on 15 June.

Admiral Wright also made the arrangements for United States Ambassador to the United Kingdom Winthrop Aldrich to present a bronze plaque of John Paul Jones from the U.S. Naval Historical Center to the British government, initiating his long-time association with the famous naval hero of the American Revolution.

During a high-level conference in Washington, D.C. from 20 October – 4 November 1953, Wright was informed that that CINCNELM was to become a sub-ordinate command of the U.S. Atlantic Fleet reporting directly to Admiral Lynde D. McCormick, the Commander-in-Chief U.S. Atlantic Fleet (CINCLANTFLT). Also, Wright would become the head of NATO's Eastern Atlantic Area, reporting to Admiral McCormick, the first Supreme Allied Commander Atlantic (SACLANT).

Admiral McCormick noted in his final fitness report dated March 1954:

VAdm. Wright has taken over the duty of the Subordinate Command with his usual vigor and ability. This command being a new concept has required analytical adeptness and initiative which he had displayed to high degree. VAdm. Wright is richly deserving of his imminent promotion to the positions which I now hold.

General Thomas T. Handy, the Deputy Commander-in-Chief, U.S. European Command, also noted:

Vice Admiral Wright has performed his task as CINCNELM with great distinction and has now been ordered to a new assignment as CINCLANT and NATO SACLANT. A brilliantly qualified officer of strong and determined character. One of the Navy's outstanding leaders.

Jeruald Wright was promoted to the rank of admiral effective 1 April 1954.

In September 1958, Admiral James L. Holloway Jr., CINCNELM, was assigned additional duty as U.S. Commander Eastern Atlantic (USCOMEASTLANT). Under the Commander in Chief, U.S. Atlantic Fleet, USCOMEASTLANT provided intelligence and logistic support for LANTFLT units deployed in the USCOMEASTLANT area.

In February 1960, the title of the command was changed to Commander in Chief, U.S. Naval Forces, Europe (CINCUSNAVEUR) and the CINCNELM title was retained for command in the Middle East from Turkey and Egypt to the middle of the Indian Ocean. Although these were separate commands, they were placed under the control of one commander. The CINCNELM command was disestablished on 1 February 1964. During most of the intervening years, CINCUSNAVEUR has exercised direct command over four subordinate commanders: Commander, U.S. Sixth Fleet (COMSIXTHFLT); Commander, Fleet Air Mediterranean (COMFAIRMED); Commander, Middle East Force (COMIDEASTFOR) (until 1983); and Commander, U.S. Naval Activities, United Kingdom (COMNAVACT UK). After the Rapid Deployment Joint Task Force became United States Central Command, the Middle East Force was reassigned to the administrative command of Commander, U.S. Naval Forces Central Command (COMUSNAVCENT) on 1 October 1983.

CINCSOUTH and CINCUSNAVEUR again shared an Admiral when Admiral William J. Crowe Jr., who was CINCSOUTH, also took the title of CINCUSNAVEUR on 1 January 1983. Admiral Crowe retained his NATO command and headquarters in Naples, Italy. Vice Admiral Ronald J. Hays, in London, became Deputy CINCUSNAVEUR and retained the title of USCOMEASTLANT. The CINCUSNAVEUR Headquarters remained in London with Admiral Crowe spending time at both locations. The responsibility of U.S. Commander Eastern Atlantic was added to that of the Commander in Chief, Allied Forces, Southern Europe and Commander in Chief, U.S. Naval Forces, Europe on 28 February 1989 during Admiral James Buchanan Busey IV's assignment as Commander in Chief.

=== Post Cold War ===
In September 1996 it was agreed that CINCUSNAVEUR could support CINCLANTFLT forces without the USCOMEASTLANT designation.

In 1999, changes to CINCUSNAVEUR's area of responsibility were announced, after amendments to the Unified Command Plan. The United States Atlantic Command areas that had included the waters off Europe and the west coast of Africa were to be transferred to European Command. U.S. European Command already had responsibility for all U.S. land and air military planning in Europe and most of Africa. The change gave EUCOM, and NAVEUR, the responsibility for maritime planning in the same general area of operations. The changes were made effective on 1 October 2000. The Atlantic Command areas that presently include the waters off Europe and the west coast of Africa were also transferred to European Command.

In 2002, the command changed its name to Commander, U.S. Naval Forces, Europe (COMUSNAVEUR).

On 15 March 2004, NATO's Joint Force Command Naples was activated and its predecessor command, Allied Forces Southern Europe, was deactivated. COMUSNAVEUR continued to be dual-hatted as COMJFC Naples. In August 2005 COMUSNAVEUR headquarters completed its relocation to Naples, Italy from London in the United Kingdom. By a directive of 20 September 2005, Naval Forces Europe and Sixth Fleet were merged. NavEur is now co-located with his NATO headquarters. U.S. Naval Activities, United Kingdom was deactivated in September 2007.

USNAVEUR is now focusing more attention on Africa, specifically the Gulf of Guinea region, partially because of the increasing importance of the oil reserves there. Ships are now often deploying to aid regional African navies, of which the most important in the region is the Nigerian Navy. Connected with this effort, a new geographic combatant command, United States Africa Command, is being stood up and is scheduled for completion in September 2008, which may mean a realignment of USN responsibilities for the West African area. As a result, NAVEUR is now sometimes referred to as US Naval Forces Europe-Africa and even NAVAF. There is currently however no approved plan to establish a separate Naval Forces Africa HQ. Two new task groups are active, Commander Task Group 60.4 which runs the Africa Partnership Station deployment series, and Commander Task Group 60.5, the Southeast Africa Task Group.

From 26 July-8 August 2021 INS Talwar (F40) visited Mombasa as part of participation in Exercise Cutlass Express 2021. Cutlass Express '21, conducted by NAVAF, included VBSS, sharing of best practices, and interoperability with partners, as well as information sharing, a key focus of the exercise.

The Commander, U.S. Naval Forces Europe-Commander, U.S. Naval Forces Africa (NAVEUR-NAVAF) area of responsibility (AOR) covers approximately half of the Atlantic Ocean, from the North Pole to Antarctica; as well as the Adriatic, Baltic, Barents, Black, Caspian, Mediterranean and North Seas. NAVEUR-NAVAF covers all of Russia, Europe and nearly the entire continent of Africa. It encompasses 105 countries with a combined population of more than one billion people and includes a landmass extending more than 14 million square miles.

The AOR covers more than 20 million square nautical miles of ocean, touches three continents and encompasses more than 67 percent of the Earth's coastline, 30 percent of its landmass, and nearly 40 percent of the world's population.

== Commanders ==
For the Navy, flag officer tours are usually limited to two-years. This was laid out as official policy in 2006.

Commander	Dates
Special Naval Observer
VADM Robert L. Ghormley, Special Naval Observer	August 1940 to March 1942
Commander, U.S. Naval Forces, Europe (COMNAVEUR)
VADM Robert L. Ghormley, Commander, U.S. Naval Forces, Europe (COMNAVEUR)	March 1942 to April 1942
ADM Harold R. Stark, COMNAVEUR	April 1942 to August 1945
ADM H. Kent Hewitt, COMNAVEUR	August 1945 to September 1946
ADM Richard L. Conolly, COMNAVEUR.	September 1946 to November 1946
Commander, U.S. Naval Forces, Eastern Atlantic and Mediterranean (COMNELM)
ADM Richard L. Conolly, Commander, U.S. Naval Forces, Eastern Atlantic and Mediterranean (COMNELM) in November 1946	November 1946 to April 1947
Commander in Chief, U.S. Naval Forces, Eastern Atlantic and Mediterranean (CINCNELM)
ADM Richard L. Conolly, title changed to: Commander in Chief, U.S. Naval Forces, Eastern Atlantic and Mediterranean (CINCNELM)	April 1947 to December 1950
ADM Robert B. Carney, CINCNELM	December 1950 to June 1952
ADM Jerauld Wright, CINCNELM	June 1952 to August 1953
CINCNELM & COMSCOMLANTFLT
ADM Jerauld Wright, CINCNELM & COMSCOMLANTFLT	August 1953 to March 1954
ADM J.H. Cassady, CINCNELM & COMSCOMLANTFLT	March 1954 to May 1956
ADM James L. Holloway Jr., CINCNELM & COMSCOMLANTFLT.	February 1958 to September 1958
CINCNELM & USCOMEASTLANT
ADM James L. Holloway Jr., CINCNELM & USCOMEASTLANT	September 1958 to March 1959
ADM Robert L. Dennison, CINCNELM & USCOMEASTLANT	March 1959 to February 1960
CINCUSNAVEUR, CINCNELM & USCOMEASTLANT
ADM Harold P. Smith, CINCNELM, USCOMEASTLANT & CINCUSNAVEUR. Commander in Chief, U.S. Naval Forces, Europe established	February 1960 to April 1963
ADM David L. McDonald, CINCUSNAVEUR, CINCNELM & USCOMEASTLANT	April 1963 to June 1963
ADM Charles D. Griffin, CINCUSNAVEUR, CINCNELM & USCOMEASTLANT	June 1963 to 1 December 1963
CINCUSNAVEUR & USCOMEASTLANT
ADM Charles D. Griffin, CINCUSNAVEUR, USCOMEASTLANT	1 December 1963 to March 1965
ADM John S. Thach, CINCUSNAVEUR & USCOMEASTLANT	March 1965 to May 1967
ADM John S. McCain Jr., CINCUSNAVEUR & USCOMEASTLANT	May 1967 to July 1968
ADM Waldemar F.A. Wendt, CINCUSNAVEUR & USCOMEASTLANT	July 1968 to June 1971
ADM William F. Bringle, CINCUSNAVEUR & USCOMEASTLANT	June 1971 to August 1973
ADM W. H. Bagley, CINCUSNAVEUR & USCOMEASTLANT	August 1973 to May 1974
ADM Harold E. Shear, CINCUSNAVEUR & USCOMEASTLANT	May 1974 to May 1975
ADM David H. Bagley, CINCUSNAVEUR & USCOMEASTLANT	May 1975 to August 1977
VADM Joseph P. Moorer, CINCUSNAVEUR & USCOMEASTLANT	August 1977 to September 1980
VADM Ronald J. Hays, CINCUSNAVEUR & USCOMEASTLANT	September 1980 to January 1983
CINCUSNAVEUR & CINCSOUTH
ADM William J. Crowe Jr., CINCSOUTH (NATO) and CINCUSNAVEUR	January 1983 to May 1983
ADM William N. Small, CINCUSNAVEUR & CINCSOUTH	May 1983 to May 1985
ADM Lee Baggett Jr., CINCUSNAVEUR & CINCSOUTH	May 1985 to November 1985
ADM Arthur S. Moreau Jr., CINCUSNAVEUR & CINCSOUTH	November 1985 to December 1986
ADM James B. Busey, CINCUSNAVEUR & CINCSOUTH	March 1987 to February 1989
CINCUSNAVEUR, CINCSOUTH & USCOMEASTLANT
ADM James B. Busey, CINCUSNAVEUR & CINCSOUTH	February 1989 to May 1989
ADM Jonathan T. Howe, CINCUSNAVEUR, CINCSOUTH & USCOMEASTLANT	May 1989 to December 1991
ADM Jeremy M. Boorda, CINCUSNAVEUR, CINCSOUTH & USCOMEASTLANT	December 1991 to April 1994
ADM Leighton W. Smith Jr., CINCUSNAVEUR, CINCSOUTH & USCOMEASTLANT	April 1994 to July 1996
ADM T. Joseph Lopez, CINCUSNAVEUR, CINCSOUTH & USCOMEASTLANT	July 1996 to 9 April 1997
CINCUSNAVEUR & CINCSOUTH
ADM T. Joseph Lopez, CINCUSNAVEUR, CINCSOUTH	9 April 1997 to October 1998
ADM James O. Ellis, CINCUSNAVEUR & CINCSOUTH	October 1998 to October 2001
ADM Gregory G. Johnson, CINCUSNAVEUR & CINCSOUTH	October 2001 to October 2002
U.S. Naval Forces Europe (COMUSNAVEUR)
ADM Gregory G. Johnson, COMUSNAVEUR	October 2002 to March 2004
COMUSNAVEUR & COMJFC Naples
ADM Gregory G. Johnson, COMUSNAVEUR & COMJFC Naples	March 2004 to October 2004
ADM Michael Mullen, COMUSNAVEUR & COMJFC Naples	October 2004 to May 2005
ADM Harry Ulrich, COMUSNAVEUR & COMJFC Naples	May 2005 to November 2007
COMUSNAVEUR, COMUSNAVAF & COMJFC Naples
ADM Mark P. Fitzgerald, COMUSNAVEUR, COMUSNAVAF & COMJFC Naples	November 2007 to October 2010
ADM Samuel J. Locklear III, COMUSNAVEUR, COMUSNAVAF & COMJFC Naples	October 2010 to 24 February 2012
ADM Bruce W. Clingan, COMUSNAVEUR, COMUSNAVAF & COMJFC Naples	24 February 2012 to 22 July 2014
ADM Mark E. Ferguson III COMUSNAVEUR, COMUSNAVAF & COMJFC Naples	22 July 2014 to 7 June 2016
COMUSNAVEUR-NAVAF & COMJFC Naples
ADM Michelle J. Howard COMUSNAVEUR-NAVAF & COMJFC Naples	7 June 2016 to 20 October 2017
Commander, U.S. Naval Forces Europe-Africa (COMCNE-CNA) and Allied Joint Force Command Naples (COMJFC Naples)
ADM James G. Foggo III COMCNE-CNA & COMJFC Naples	20 October 2017 to 17 July 2020
ADM Robert P. Burke COMCNE-CNA & COMJFC Naples	17 July 2020 to 27 June 2022
ADM Stuart B. Munsch COMCNE-CNA & COMJFC Naples	27 June 2022 to 19 November 2025
ADM George Wikoff COMCNE-CNA & COMJFC Naples	19 November 2025 to present
