= Arthur S. Moreau Jr. =

United States Navy admiral (1931-1986)

Admiral Arthur S. Moreau Jr.
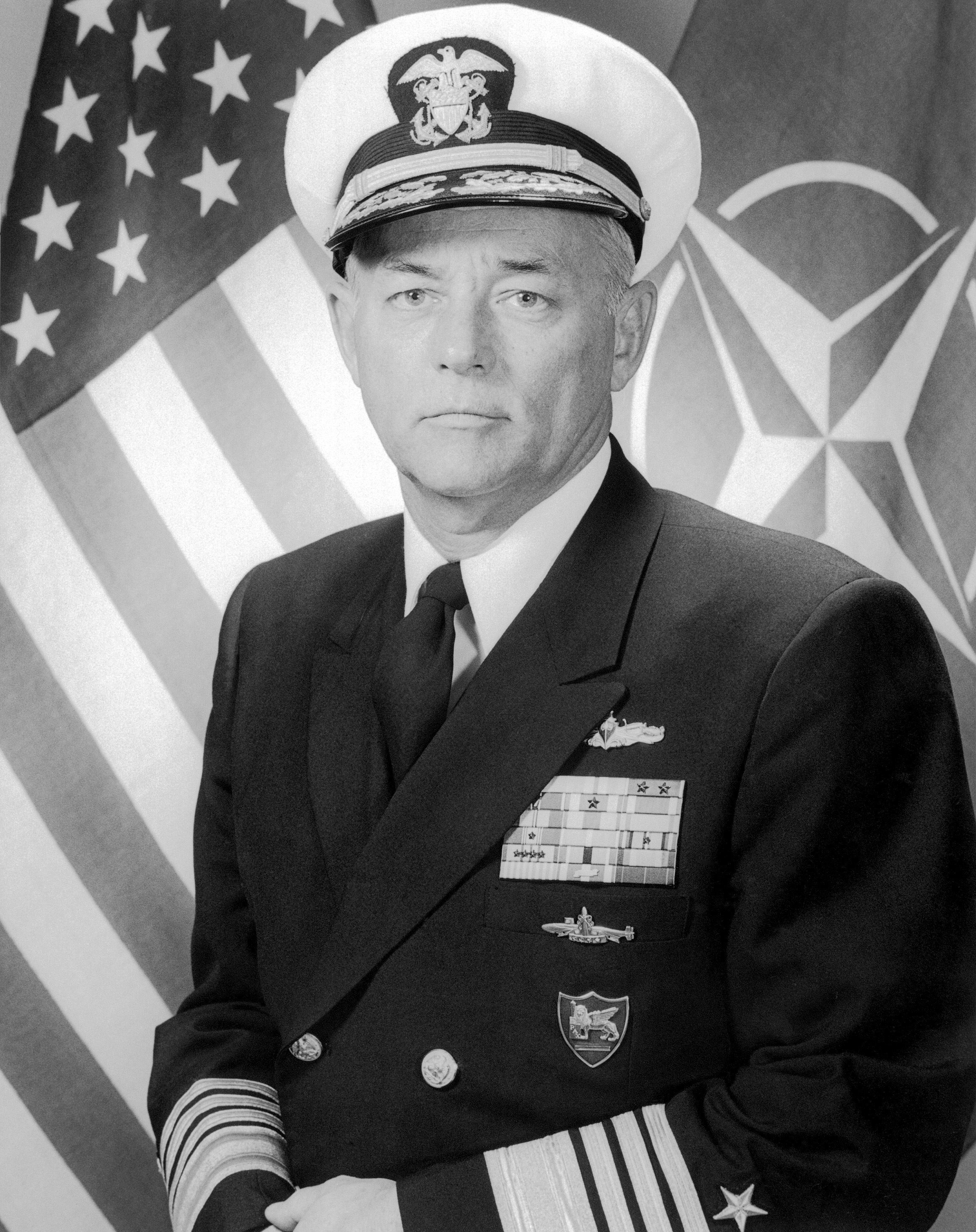
- Arthur S. Moreau Jr.
- Born: June 3, 1931; Mount Rainier, Maryland, U.S.
- Died: December 8, 1986 (aged 55); Naples, Italy
- Burial place: Arlington National Cemetery
- Education: United States Naval Academy (BS)
- Military career
- Allegiance: United States of America
- Branch: United States Navy
- Service years: 1953–1986
- Rank: Admiral
- Commands: Allied Forces Southern Europe; United States Naval Forces Europe; U.S. Naval Base Subic Bay
- Conflicts: Vietnam War
- Awards: Navy Distinguished Service Medal; Defense Superior Service Medal; Legion of Merit (3); Bronze Star Medal

Arthur Stanley "Art" Moreau Jr. (June 3, 1931 – December 8, 1986) was a United States Navy four-star admiral who served as commander-in-chief, United States Naval Forces Europe and commander-in-chief, Allied Forces Southern Europe from 1985 until his death in 1986.

== Early life ==
Moreau was born on June 3, 1931, in Mount Rainier, Maryland. He graduated from the United States Naval Academy in 1953.

== Naval career ==
Moreau served as Deputy Chief of Naval Operations for Plans, Policy and Operation, and as commander-in-chief of U.S. Naval Base Subic Bay in the Philippines.

From May 1983 to October 1985, Moreau served as assistant to the Chairman of the Joint Chiefs of Staff. According to journalist Seymour Hersh, Moreau oversaw a team which coordinated more than 30 covert missions against drug traffickers, terrorists and Soviet spies. The team was staffed mostly by naval officers. Missions were authorised by then Vice President George H. W. Bush and used Delta Force and the United States Marine Corps as operators, bypassing the CIA.

In September 1985, Moreau was appointed commander-in-chief of the United States Naval Forces Europe and Allied Forces Southern Europe. He took command in November 1985. In this position, Moreau oversaw the largest of the four military regions under Allied Command Europe, with an area of responsibility including Italy, Greece, Turkey, the Black Sea, and the Mediterranean, and including United States Sixth Fleet and U.S. Naval Activities, United Kingdom.

On December 8, 1986, Moreau died of a heart attack at a military hospital in Naples, Italy, at the age of 55, while still on active duty. Navy officials were reportedly shocked at Moreau's death. Admiral James B. Busey IV was appointed to replace Moreau.

Moreau was survived by a wife and five children.
