= Joseph P. Moorer =

United States naval officer

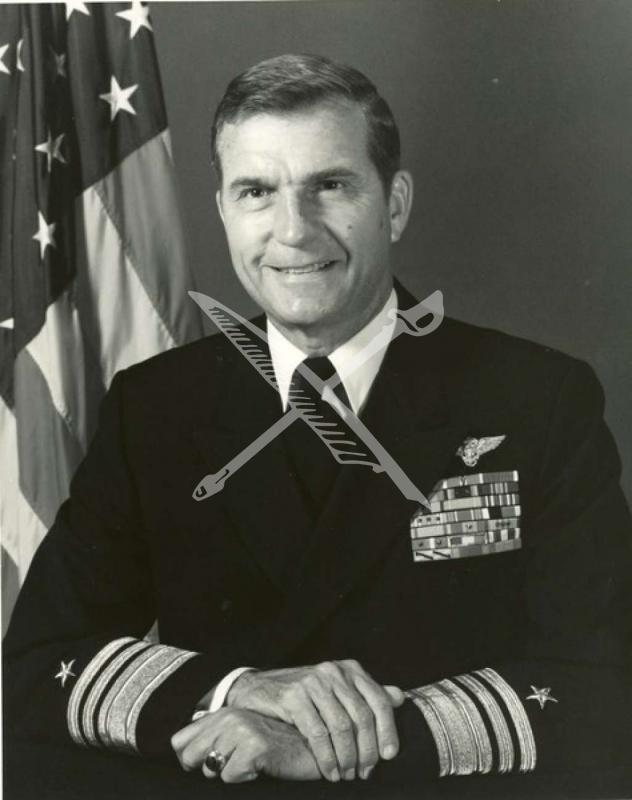
- Born: October 18, 1922; Mount Willing, Alabama
- Died: February 26, 2014 (aged 91); Ponte Vedra Beach, Florida
- Relatives: Admiral Thomas Hinman Moorer (brother)
- Military career
- Allegiance: United States
- Branch: United States Navy
- Service years: 1941–1980
- Rank: Vice Admiral
- Commands: United States Naval Forces Europe; Carrier Group 6 USS Ranger (CVA-61); USS Camden (AOE-2); VF-62
- Conflicts: World War II; Vietnam War
- Awards: Legion of Merit (2); Bronze Star Medal; Purple Heart

Joseph Park Moorer (October 18, 1922 – February 26, 2014) was a vice admiral in the United States Navy. Born in Mount Willing, Alabama, he was the younger brother of Admiral Thomas Hinman Moorer. Joe Moorer graduated from the United States Naval Academy in 1941 and served in the Pacific Theater in World War II and in the Vietnam War. From 1977 to 1980, he served as Commander in Chief of United States Naval Forces Europe, headquartered in London, England. He retired in 1980 and died at his Florida home in 2014.

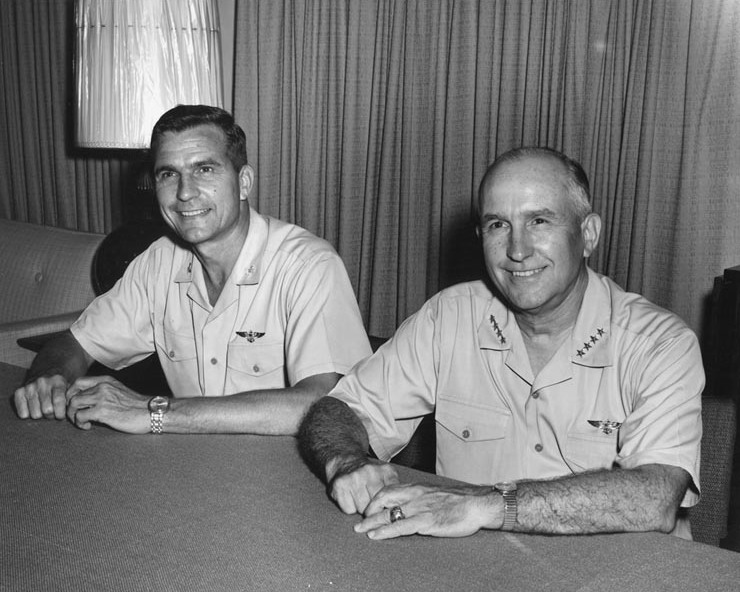
Captain Joe P. Moorer (left) with his brother, Thomas Hinman Moorer on June 30, 1967, aboard USS Bon Homme Richard
