= Moorer-Radford Affair =

1970 US political espionage scandal under Nixon

The Moorer-Radford Affair was a political scandal involving members of the Joint Chiefs of Staff who operated an espionage operation against President Richard Nixon's Cabinet, from 1970 to 1971.

== Background ==
Throughout the Nixon presidency, many senior ranking military leaders were highly critical of the secretive nature of Nixon's foreign and domestic policy which they felt kept them out of key decision making or knowledge about key aspects of U.S foreign policy and national security.

In November, 1970 Chairman of the Joint Chiefs of Staff, Admiral Thomas H. Moorer expressed concerns regarding the foreign policy decisions of Richard Nixon and Henry Kissinger, primarily involving the war in Vietnam, the détente with the Soviet Union, and the attempts to begin opening trade with China.

Fearing communist sympathies from the President and his National Security Adviser, Admiral Moorer organized a spy ring inside the White House's National Security Council office with the purpose of obtaining classified documents to undermine the policies of Nixon's White House.

== The affair ==
In December 1971, the Nixon Administration became concerned over a column written by journalist Jack Anderson titled "U.S. Tilts to Pakistan" which contained confidential information from classified documents regarding unofficial U.S. diplomatic policy in relation to the Indo-Pakistani war of 1971. Following the publication of the article, White House aides led by John Ehrlichman began an internal investigation into a possible intelligence leak. After an extensive investigation which included administering polygraphs to those with access to the files, the investigation determined the source of the leak to be the Joints Chiefs of Staff liaison office to the National Security Council. The office was staffed primarily by Admiral Robert O. Welander who supervised the office and Yeoman Charles Radford who worked as a stenographer‐clerk.

Yeoman Radford eventually admitted to having stolen classified documents from the National Security Council which he took from briefcases and burn bags to be delivered to his superiors, Admiral Robert O. Welander and Admiral Rembrandt C. Robinson, who in turn delivered them to Admiral Thomas H. Moorer, the Chairman of the Joint Chiefs of Staff. Admiral Elmo Zumwalt, then Chief of Naval Operations, was also implicated as having involvement in the conspiracy, along with National Security Council staffer David Oscar Bowles.

A week after the publishing of Jack Anderson's article, John Ehrlichman met with President Richard Nixon, Attorney General John N. Mitchell and Chief of Staff H. R. Haldeman to discuss the outcome of his investigation. The meeting was recorded by Nixon as part of the Nixon White House tapes. During the meeting Nixon voiced suspicion of Alexander Haig being involved and discussed prosecuting Admiral Moorer. Eventually Nixon decided to cover up the affair on the advice of Attorney General Mitchell, believing its revelation would hurt military morale and that ignoring it would cause the Joint Chiefs of Staff to be indebted to the President, thus increasing his control over The Pentagon.

== Aftermath ==
Soon after the affair was revealed, Admiral Robert O. Welander and Yeoman Radford were transferred to remote military posts. The details of the scandal eventually came to light in 1974 during the Watergate Scandal. Many of those implicated in the affair publicly denied their involvement and the story was soon overshadowed by other aspects of Watergate and largely forgotten. The event remained obscure until the 1990s.

On October 26, 2000, audio recordings made by President Nixon regarding his initial conversations about the affair were declassified and released for public access.
