= Charles K. Duncan =

United States Navy admiral

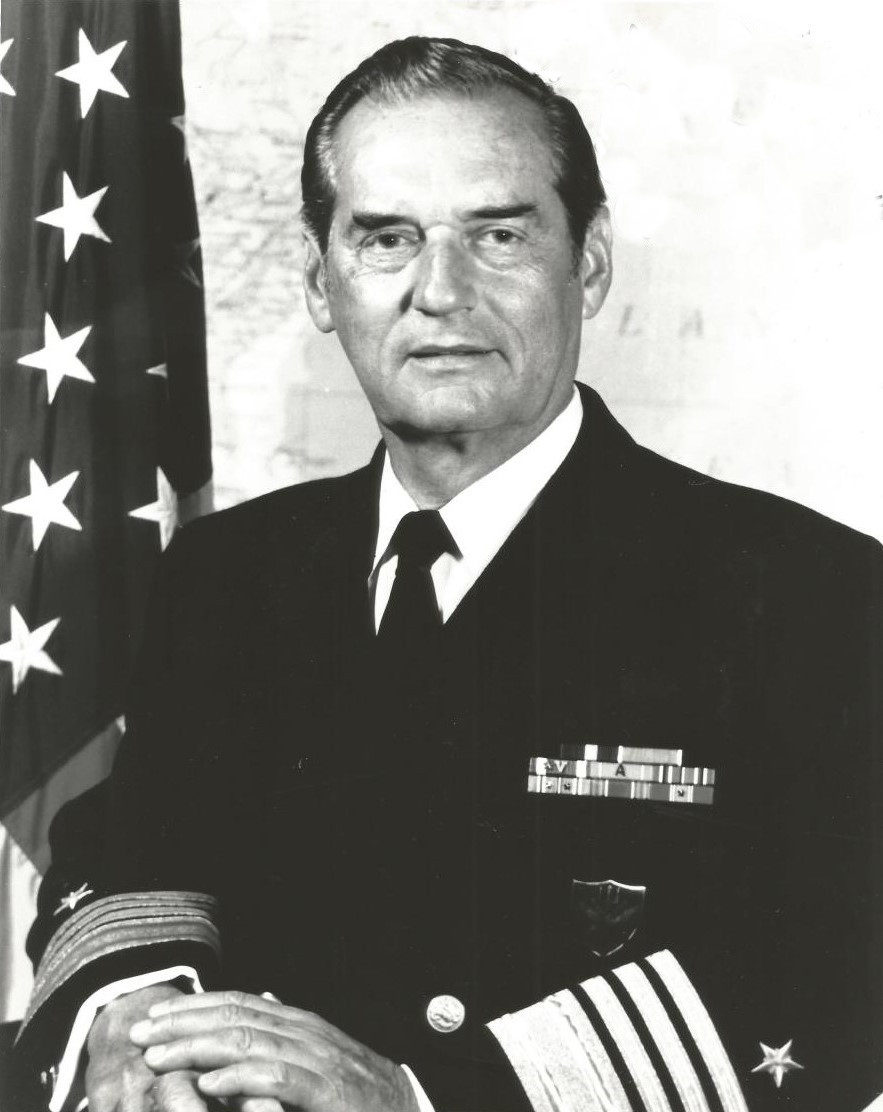
- As SACLANT/CINCLANT/CINCLANTFLT, c. 1970s
- Born: December 7, 1911; Nicholasville, Kentucky, U.S.
- Died: June 27, 1994 (aged 82); La Jolla, California, U.S.
- Military career
- Allegiance: United States of America
- Branch: United States Navy
- Service years: 1933–1972
- Rank: Admiral
- Commands: Atlantic Command; U.S. Atlantic Fleet; Second Fleet; U.S. Naval Base Subic Bay; Amphibious Training Command; USS Wilson (DD-408)
- Conflicts: World War II; Cold War
- Awards: Distinguished Service Medal; Legion of Merit
- Other work: Board of Trustees, San Diego Museum of Art

Charles Kenney Duncan (December 7, 1911 – June 27, 1994) was a United States Navy four star admiral who served as Supreme Allied Commander Atlantic/Commander in Chief, United States Atlantic Command/Commander in Chief, U.S. Atlantic Fleet (SACLANT/CINCLANT/CINCLANTFLT) from 1970 to 1972.

== Military career ==
Duncan was born on December 7, 1911, in Nicholasville, Kentucky. At the age of nine his mother became a full professor at the University of Kentucky, and the family moved to Lexington, where he attended University High School, Kavanaugh Preparatory School, and the University of Kentucky before entering the United States Naval Academy. Graduating in 1933, he was commissioned an Ensign and was assigned to the USS Salt Lake City (CA-25), where he remained for five years. Transferring to the Atlantic in 1938, he served aboard the USS Schenck (DD-159), and in June 1940 was assigned to the staff of Commander Destroyers, Atlantic Fleet, at the time of that command's creation. During his tenure he met Sheila Taylor of Halifax, Nova Scotia, whom he married in the summer of 1941 in Bermuda.

In 1942 he was the first executive officer of the destroyer USS Hutchins (DD-476), which proceeded from the Atlantic to the Pacific, taking part in combat in the Aleutians and the South Pacific. He was given command of the USS Wilson (DD-408), seeing combat in the South and Central Pacific areas. During this time he was awarded two Navy Commendation medals with Combat "V." Towards the end of the war he was assigned as Director of Naval Officer Procurement, Bureau of Naval Personnel, a position he held from 1944 to 1946.

Following World War II, he served in various capacities such as Executive Assistant to the Chief of Naval Personnel 1953 to 1955, a battleship executive officer, commanding an amphibious ship and a destroyer division, and as operations officer of the U.S. Pacific Fleet. He also served on the Holloway Board whose mission was to "study the form, system, and method of education of Naval officers." The outcome of the board was the establishment of modern Naval ROTC and direct commissions for college graduates from Officer Candidate School.

Duncan was promoted to flag rank in the summer of 1958, and concurrently assigned Commander, Amphibious Group One from 1958 to 1959, followed by Commander, Amphibious Training Command, Pacific Fleet from 1959 to 1961. He took command of U.S. Naval Base Subic Bay in January 1961, During his tenure he served as president of a Philippine charity and vice president of the Philippines Tubercular Association.

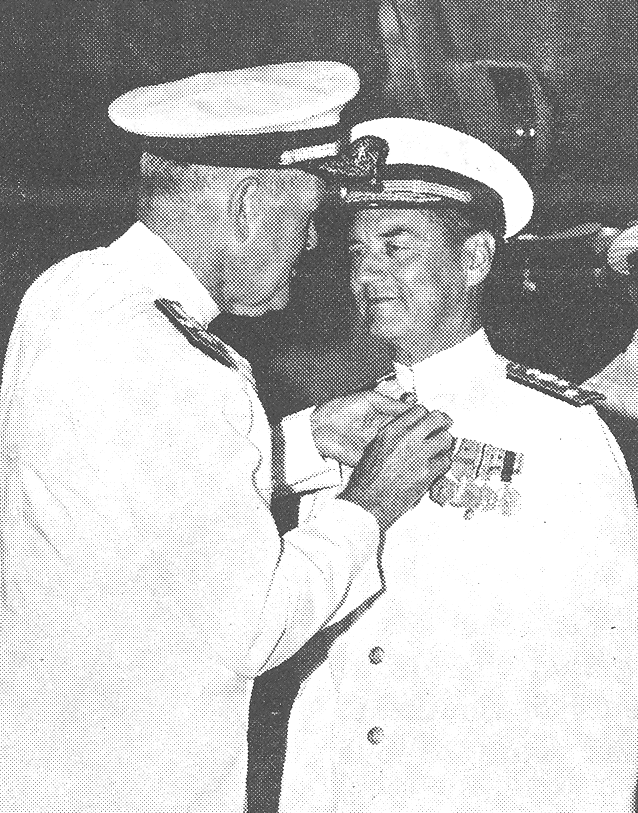
As commander of the Second Fleet (right), receiving Legion of Merit from Admiral Ephraim P. Holmes, 1967.

After a stint as Assistant Chief of Naval Personnel for Plans and Programs from 1962 to 1964, he turned to command, as Commander, Atlantic Fleet Cruiser-Destroyer Force from 1964 to 1965, then commanded the United States Second Fleet and NATO's Striking Fleet Atlantic and the Atlantic Fleet Amphibious Force. During this time he was promoted to vice admiral. He was awarded the Legion of Merit for "exceptionally meritorious service" while Commander Amphibious Force, U.S. Atlantic Fleet, from June 1965 to May 1967.

Duncan became Deputy Chief of Naval Operations (Manpower and Naval Reserve) and the Chief of Naval Personnel, serving in that capacity from April 1968 to August 1970, before becoming the seventh NATO Supreme Allied Commander Atlantic on September 30, 1970, and concurrently Commander in Chief Atlantic (the United States Unified Command) and the Commander in Chief of the U.S. Atlantic Fleet. As Supreme Allied Commander, Atlantic, he conducted the largest NATO naval exercises held until that time. He received the Order of Orange-Nassau from the Netherlands, and the Grand Cross of the Order of Aviz from Portugal. He retired from the U.S. Navy on November 1, 1972, as a full admiral.

== Post-military career ==
After retiring, he lived near Leesburg, Virginia, until January 1977, continuing to serve as a member of the Secretary of the Navy's Advisory Board on Education and Training, and as a member of the Board of Advisors to the President, U.S. Naval War College in Newport, Rhode Island. He eventually moved to Coronado, California.

He became a member of the Board of Trustees of the San Diego Museum of Art in 1981, and in 1984, he was elected as a member of France's Académie de Marine and also was named a Kentucky colonel. He died of cancer on June 27, 1994, at the Scripps Clinic in La Jolla, California.
