= Gregory G. Johnson =

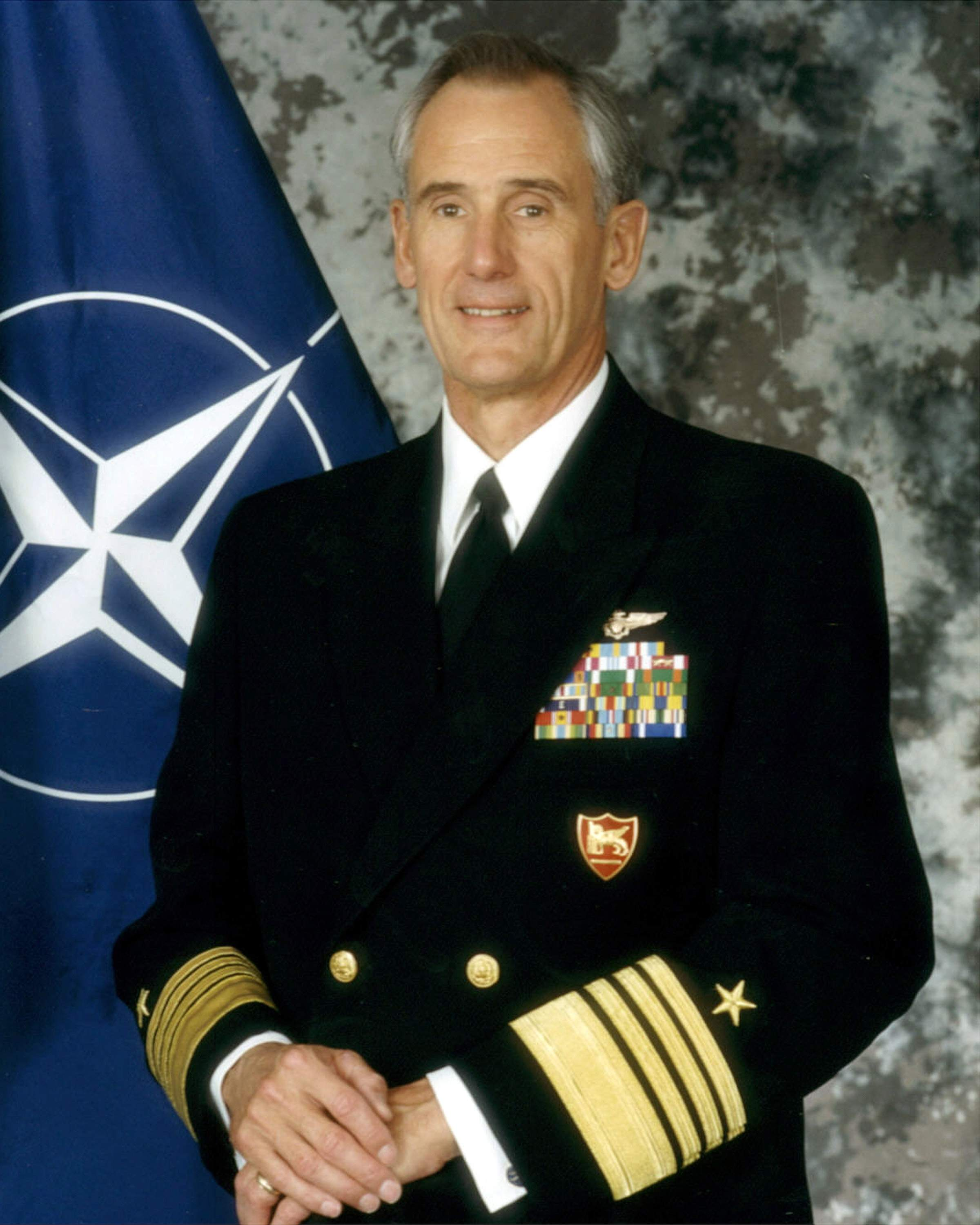
- Admiral Gregory G. Johnson
- Born: July 11, 1946 (age 80)
- Military career
- Allegiance: United States
- Branch: United States Navy
- Service years: 1969–2004
- Rank: Admiral
- Nickname: "Grog"
- Commands: United States Naval Forces Europe; United States Sixth Fleet; Carrier Strike Group 8 Carrier Air Wing Three
- Awards: Defense Distinguished Service Medal (3); Defense Superior Service Medal; Legion of Merit (3)

Admiral Gregory Gordon Johnson (born July 11, 1946) is a retired United States Navy admiral and former commander of United States Naval Forces Europe and Allied Forces Southern Europe.

== Naval career ==
Johnson is from Westmanland, Maine. He attended Caribou High School, graduating in 1964. Johnson received a Bachelor of Arts degree in political science from the University of Maine. Following Aviation Officer Candidate School, he was commissioned in 1969 and designated a Naval Aviator in 1970.

Johnson's initial sea duty assignment was in VA-66 flying the A-7E Corsair II and deploying in USS Nimitz. Subsequent squadron and sea duty assignments include VFA-86 on USS Nimitz; VA-174; executive officer and commanding officer of VA-105 (Marine Aircraft Group 12, 1st Marine Aircraft Wing); deputy commander, Carrier Air Wing Six on USS Forrestal; and commander, Carrier Air Wing Three on USS Dwight D. Eisenhower.

Shore duty assignments include the Command and Staff Course, Naval War College (graduating with highest distinction); Systems Analysis Division (OP-96) of the Office of the Chief of Naval Operations; F/A-18/A-7 readiness officer on the staff Commander Naval Air Force, United States Atlantic Fleet; Joint Chiefs of Staff as head of the European Command/Central Command Branch of the Joint Operations Division (JOD), Operations Directorate (J-3); and Office of the Chairman of the Joint Chiefs of Staff as the executive assistant to the chairman.

Johnson was selected for flag rank in February 1995. His first flag assignment was as the director of operations, plans, and policy (N3/N5) on the Commander in Chief, United States Atlantic Fleet staff. In February 1996, he reported as commander, Carrier Group Eight/USS Theodore Roosevelt Battle Group, where he served until August 1997. In September 1997 he reported as the senior military assistant to the Deputy Secretary of Defense.

In May 1999, Johnson assumed duties as the senior military assistant to the Secretary of Defense. His previous assignment was commander, United States Sixth Fleet and Naval Striking and Support Forces Southern Europe. Johnson assumed duties as commander, United States Naval Forces Europe and commander in chief, Allied Forces Southern Europe on October 24, 2001. He retired from the navy in December 2004.

== Awards and decorations ==

Naval Aviator Badge
Defense Distinguished Service Medal with two bronze oak leaf clusters		Defense Superior Service Medal
Legion of Merit with two gold award stars	Defense Meritorious Service Medal	Meritorious Service Medal with two award stars
Air Medal with bronze strike/flight numeral 1	Navy and Marine Corps Commendation Medal	Navy and Marine Corps Achievement Medal
Joint Meritorious Unit Award	Navy Unit Commendation with one bronze service star	Navy Meritorious Unit Commendation
Navy E Ribbon	Fleet Marine Force Ribbon	Navy Expeditionary Medal
National Defense Service Medal with two service stars	Armed Forces Expeditionary Medal	Southwest Asia Service Medal
Armed Forces Service Medal	Navy Sea Service Deployment Ribbon with silver service star	NATO Medal for the former Yugoslavia with service star
Allied Joint Force Command Naples

In 2003, he was awarded the Naval War College Distinguished Graduate Leadership Award.

== Post military ==
After retiring from the navy, Johnson settled in Harpswell, Maine. He started Snow Ridge Associates, a consulting firm. He is also a member of the Energy Security Leadership Council, and sits on the board of directors of Integrian, a surveillance technology company. He is also an outside director of CACI International, and he sits on the board of directors of the Maine Port Authority.

Johnson serves as a co-leader of the National Security Project (NSP) at the Bipartisan Policy Center.

Johnson serves on the Board of Trustees for Maine Maritime Academy in Castine, Maine.
