= Thomas J. Lopez =

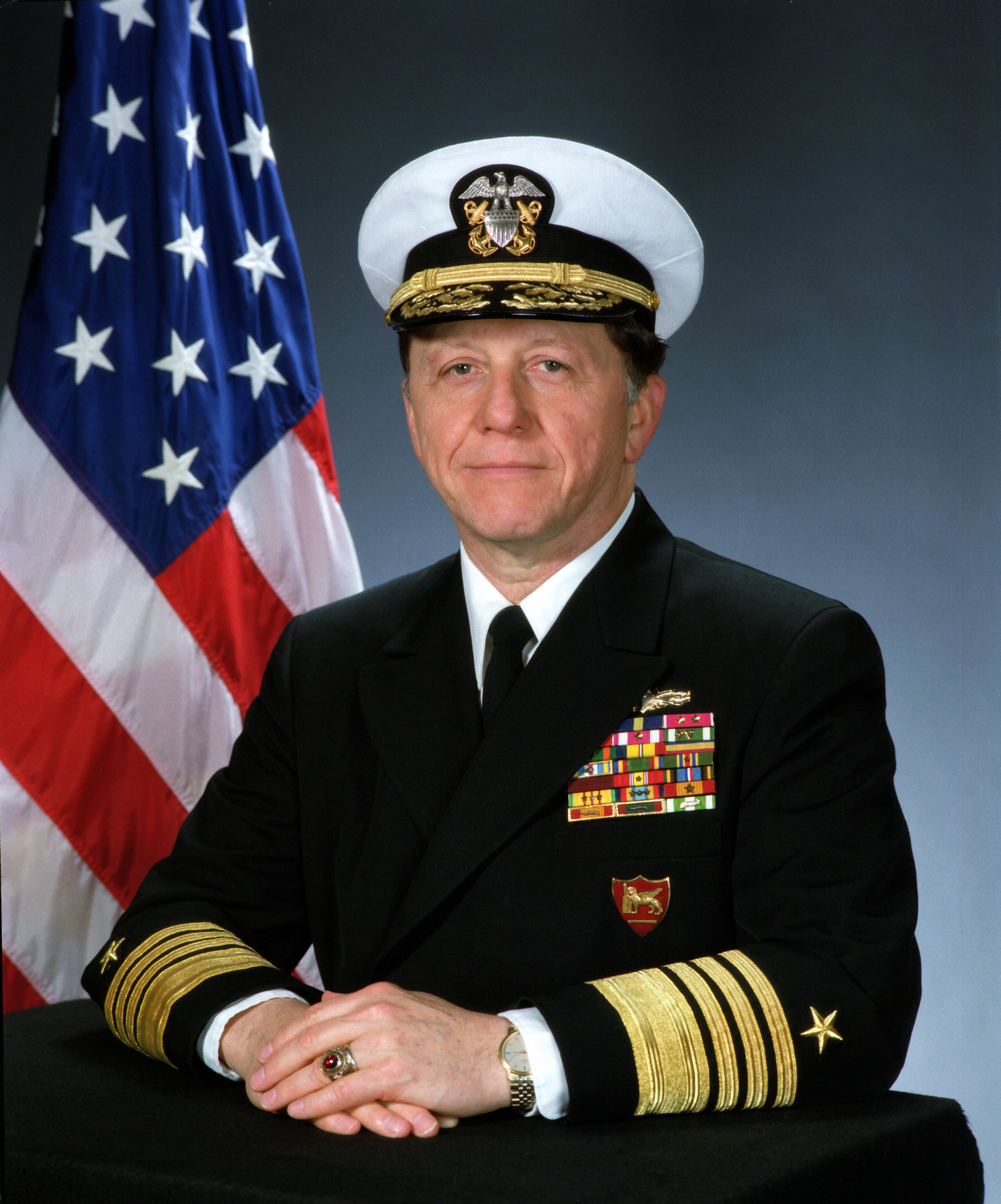
- Admiral Thomas J. Lopez
- Born: January 29, 1940 (age 86); Powellton, West Virginia, U.S.
- Military career
- Branch: United States Navy
- Service years: 1964–1998
- Rank: Admiral
- Commands: Allied Forces Southern Europe; United States Naval Forces Europe; United States Sixth Fleet
- Conflicts: Vietnam War
- Awards: Defense Distinguished Service Medal; Navy Distinguished Service Medal (2); Legion of Merit (3); Bronze Star Medal

Admiral Thomas Joseph Lopez (born January 29, 1940) is a retired United States Navy four-star admiral who served as Commander in Chief, United States Naval Forces Europe/Commander in Chief, Allied Forces Southern Europe from 1996 to 1998.

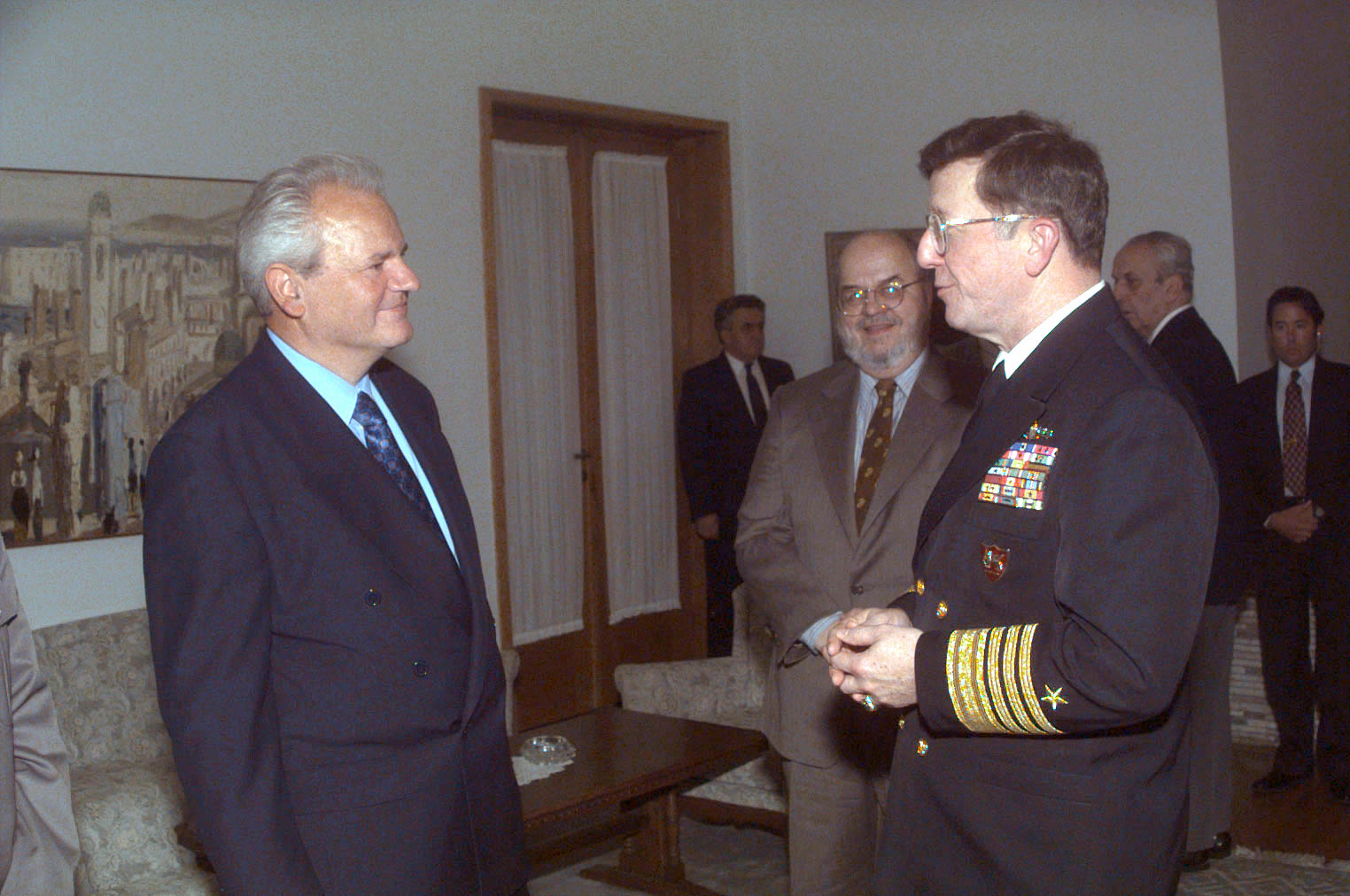
Slobodan Milošević with Admiral Thomas J. Lopez in Belgrade, 9 September 1996.

== Awards and decorations ==

Surface Warfare Officer Badge
Defense Distinguished Service Medal	Navy Distinguished Service Medal with one gold award star	Legion of Merit with two award stars
Bronze Star with Combat V	Meritorious Service Medal with award star	Navy and Marine Corps Commendation Medal with Combat V and award star
Navy and Marine Corps Achievement Medal with award star	Combat Action Ribbon	Navy Presidential Unit Citation
Joint Meritorious Unit Award with one bronze oak leaf cluster	Navy Unit Commendation	Navy Meritorious Unit Commendation with one bronze service star
Navy Good Conduct Medal	National Defense Service Medal with service star	Armed Forces Expeditionary Medal
Vietnam Service Medal with seven service stars	Navy Sea Service Deployment Ribbon with three service stars	Vietnam Gallantry Cross with bronze star
Vietnam Gallantry Cross Unit Citation	Vietnam Civil Actions Medal Unit Citation	Vietnam Campaign Medal
