= Ephraim P. Holmes =

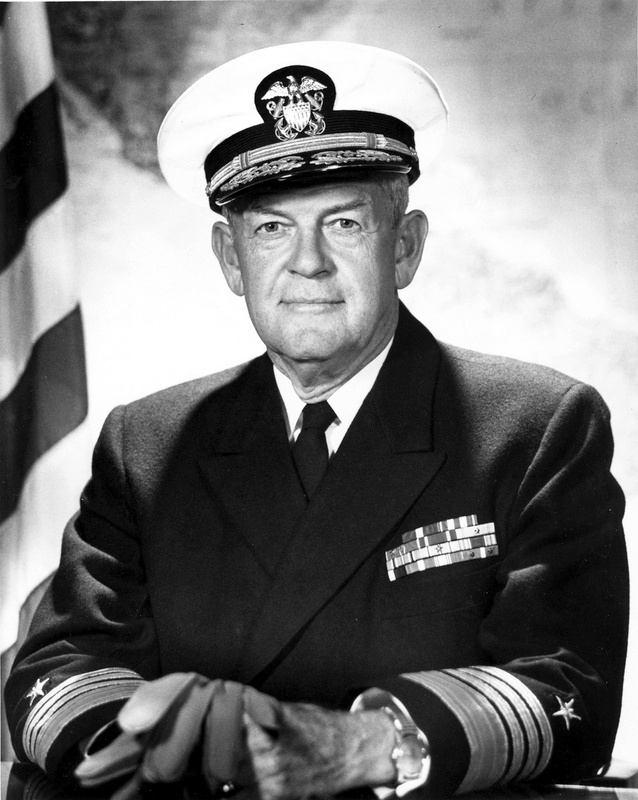
- Admiral Ephraim P. Holmes
- Born: May 14, 1908; Downsville, New York, U.S.
- Died: February 23, 1997 (aged 88); Williamsburg, Virginia, U.S.
- Military career
- Allegiance: United States of America
- Branch: United States Navy
- Service years: 1930–1970
- Rank: Admiral
- Commands: Atlantic Fleet
- Conflicts: World War II; Cold War
- Awards: Distinguished Service Medal; Silver Star; Bronze Star
- Other work: Executive director, Virginia Port Authority

Ephraim Paul Holmes (May 14, 1908 – February 23, 1997) was a four-star admiral in the United States Navy who served as commander in chief of the U.S. Atlantic Fleet and Supreme Allied Commander, Atlantic from 1967 to 1970.

== Early career ==
Born in Downsville, New York to Edward Holmes and Dolly Hathaway, he graduated from the United States Naval Academy in 1930.

Commissioned ensign on June 5, 1930, his first assignment was aboard the light cruiser Milwaukee. In January 1931, he transferred to the newly commissioned heavy cruiser Augusta, remaining with the vessel for its shakedown cruise and subsequent operations with the Scouting Force off the East Coast.

Detached in May 1932, he was sent to China waters to join the heavy cruiser Houston, flagship of the U.S. Asiatic Fleet, which was operating near Shanghai to protect American interests in the aftermath of the Sino-Japanese incident of 1932. From May 1933 to July 1935 he was assigned as gunnery officer and first lieutenant of the destroyer Peary for duty with the Yangtze River Patrol.

In 1936, he returned to the United States for instruction in applied communications at the Naval Postgraduate School in Annapolis, Maryland. In July 1938, he reported aboard the battleship Maryland, serving as turret officer for the first year, then as fire control and plotting room officer.

== World War II ==
In January 1941 he was assigned as aide and flag lieutenant to Commander Battleships, Battle Force. He was present on the signal bridge of the battleship Maryland during the Japanese attack on Pearl Harbor, and later participated in the Battles of the Coral Sea and Midway. In September 1942 he became aide and flag secretary to Commander Battleship Division Four, whose vessels supported the actions off Guadalcanal and the Santa Cruz Islands.

In 1943 he was assigned to fitting out duty in the new destroyer Stockham at the Bethlehem Steel Company in San Francisco, California. He assumed command of the destroyer at its commissioning on February 11, 1944. Stockham conducted shakedown training off the west coast before departing for the Pacific theater in April. Over the next year, Holmes would be repeatedly cited for exceptional performance in combat as Stockham's commanding officer.

In June and July 1944, Stockham was attached to Destroyer Squadron Fifty-Six for the invasion of the Mariana Islands. "Cool and capable in directing the delivery of accurate and effective gunfire from his ship, [Holmes] rendered valuable assistance in the destruction of enemy troops and shore installations and thereby contributed materially to the success of the landing operations."

He was awarded the Silver Star for his actions on June 19, 1944, during the Battle of the Philippine Sea. "Stationed as a picket in the direct line of enemy approach, [Holmes] fought off repeated dive bomber and torpedo attacks and bore the brunt of responsibility for breaking up the approaches. Shooting down three enemy planes, damaging two more and turning away many others without casualty to his ship, he assisted materially in disrupting the enemy attack."

From September to November 1944, he led Stockham in combat operations against Japanese forces on Palau, Mindanao, Visayas, Nansei Shoto, and Formosa; and during the Battle for Leyte Gulf. "Directing his ship as part of a Fast Carrier Task Force Unit, [Holmes] provided a screen of heavy and accurate antiaircraft fire, assisting materially in repelling four determined enemy aircraft attacks and in shooting down at least one enemy plane."

He was detached from Stockham in January 1945.

== Postwar ==
In February 1945 he reported as officer in charge of general line and applied communications curricula at the Naval Postgraduate School, Annapolis, Maryland, where he remained until July 1947, when he joined the staff of the Commander in Chief, U.S. Atlantic Fleet, as assistant chief of staff for communications. He was promoted to the permanent rank of captain on July 22, 1948, having served in that rank on a temporary basis from December 10, 1945, to January 1, 1948.

He was a student at the Naval War College in Newport, Rhode Island from July 1950 to June 1951, then was appointed to teach at the Armed Forces Staff College in Norfolk, Virginia.

In August 1952 he assumed command of the attack transport Sanborn, which conducted landing exercises at Vieques, Puerto Rico and Onslow Beach, North Carolina as part of Amphibious Force, Atlantic Fleet. He was detached in July 1953 for duty as operations, planning and training officer on the staff of Commander Amphibious Force, Atlantic Fleet. In October 1955 he was assigned as commanding officer of the cruiser Northampton.

== Flag officer ==
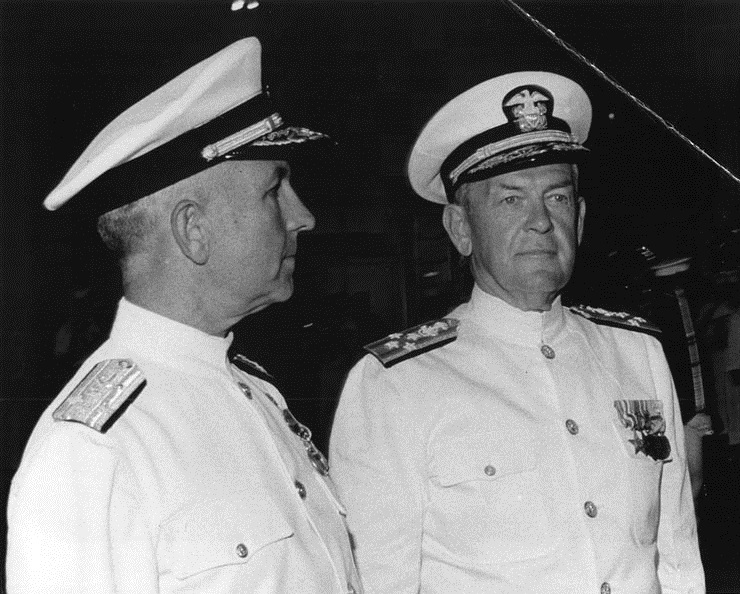
Admiral Ephraim P. Holmes (right), relieving Admiral Thomas H. Moorer as commander in chief of the U.S. Atlantic Fleet and Atlantic Command during change of command ceremonies aboard USS Randolph (CVS-15), June 17, 1967.

In early 1957, he reported as special assistant to the deputy chief of naval operations (plans and policy). He was promoted to rear admiral on July 1, 1957. He became Commander Cruiser Division Four in 1959, then returned to the Navy Department in March 1960 as assistant chief of naval operations (general planning) and director, General Planning Group.

Advanced to vice admiral on February 25, 1963, he assumed command of Amphibious Force, Pacific Fleet in March, then served as Commander, First Fleet from January 25, 1964, to July 18, 1964.

From August 5, 1964, to June 3, 1967, he was director of Navy program planning and scientific officer to the Center for Naval Analyses in the office of the chief of naval operations. As principal advisor to the Chief of Naval Operations on programming matters, he was recognized for his expertise on the Department of Defense Programming System and its application within the Department of the Navy. "Through his extensive knowledge of the complex development of this system...Vice Admiral Holmes rendered valuable service in implementing organizational improvements in the areas of programming, planning, systems analysis, and financial management within the Department of the Navy, thereby contributing significantly to the United States mission in the Southeast Asian conflict."

He was promoted to admiral upon succeeding Admiral Thomas H. Moorer as Commander in Chief, U.S. Atlantic Fleet (CINCLANTFLT) on June 17, 1967, with concurrent appointment as Commander in Chief, Atlantic Command (CINCLANT) and NATO Commander in Chief, Western Atlantic and Supreme Allied Commander, Atlantic (SACLANT). As CINCLANTFLT, he was responsible for maintaining the combat readiness, training and logistical support of some 220,000 people. He relinquished command to Admiral Charles K. Duncan on September 30, 1970, and retired on October 1.

== Personal life ==
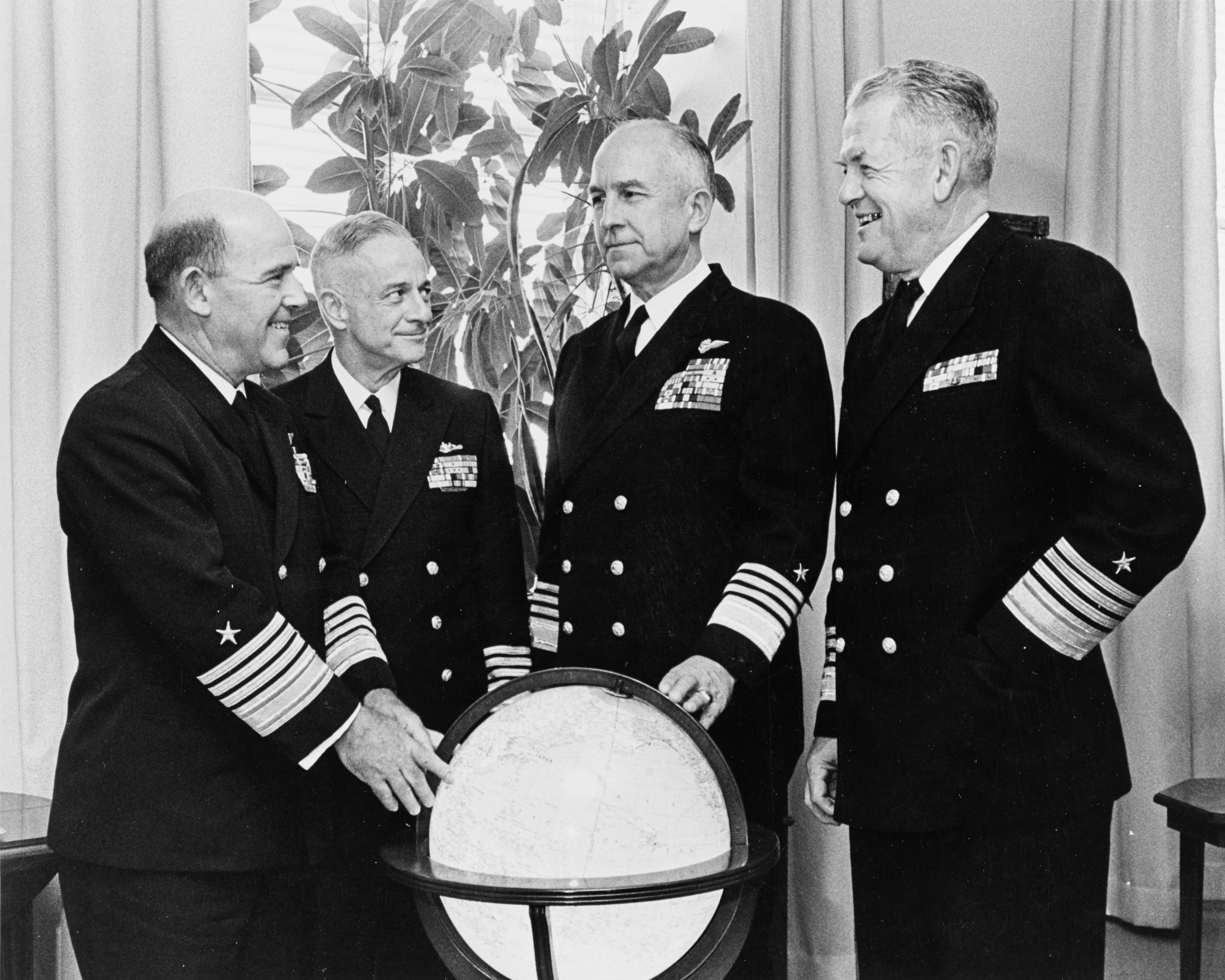
As Commander in Chief, U.S. Atlantic Fleet (right), with Admirals John J. Hyland, John S. McCain Jr., and Thomas H. Moorer, 1968.

After retiring from the Navy, he was appointed executive director of the Virginia Port Authority in 1971.

He married the former Nancy Jane Sellers of Denver, Colorado on October 11, 1933, and they had two children, Diane Hathaway Fletcher and Navy officer Ephraim Paul Holmes Jr. He died at his home in Williamsburg, Virginia at the age of 88, and was buried with his wife in the U.S. Naval Academy Cemetery.

== Awards and decorations ==
His decorations include the Navy Distinguished Service Medal, awarded for exceptionally meritorious service as director of Navy program planning; the Silver Star, awarded for conspicuous gallantry and intrepidity during a major engagement with a large enemy Japanese air force between the Philippines and Saipan on June 19, 1944; the Bronze Star with Combat "V", awarded for meritorious service as Stockham commanding officer during the assault and capture of enemy Japanese-held islands in June and July 1944; the Gold Star in lieu of the Second Bronze Star Medal, also with Combat "V", awarded for commanding Stockham in operations against enemy Japanese forces from September to November 1944; the Yangtze Service Medal; the American Defense Service Medal with Fleet Clasp; the American Campaign Medal; the Asiatic–Pacific Campaign Medal with four engagement stars; the World War II Victory Medal; the National Defense Service Medal with bronze star; and the Philippine Liberation Ribbon with two stars.

- Navy Distinguished Service Medal
- Silver Star
- Bronze Star with Valor Device
- Yangtze Service Medal
- American Defense Service Medal with Fleet Clasp
- American Campaign Medal
- Asiatic–Pacific Campaign Medal
- World War II Victory Medal
- Navy Occupation Service Medal
- National Defense Service Medal with bronze star
- Philippine Liberation Medal
- Knight Grand Cross of the Order of Orange-Nassau with Swords (Netherlands, 1970)

== See also ==
Military offices
Preceded by Thomas H. Moorer	Commander in Chief, United States Atlantic Fleet; June 17, 1967–September 30, 1970	Succeeded by Charles K. Duncan
