= United States Atlantic Command =

Former U.S. Unified Combatant Command (1947–1999)

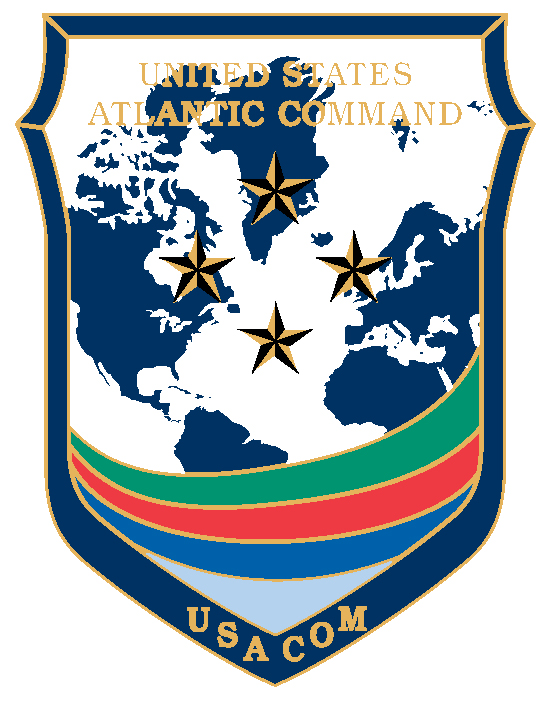
- Active: 1947–1999
- Country: United States of America
- Type: Unified Combatant Command
- Nickname: USLANTCOM

The United States Atlantic Command (acronym from 1947-1993 USLANTCOM, after 1993 USACOM) was a Unified Combatant Command of the United States Department of Defense. In 1999, U.S. Atlantic Command was renamed and given a new mission as United States Joint Forces Command.

USLANTCOM was active from 1947 to 1993 primarily as a U.S. Navy command, focused upon the wartime defense of the Atlantic sea lanes against Soviet attack, with the U.S. Atlantic Fleet and other subunified commands such as the Iceland Defense Force under its authority. The Navy's leading place within the command had been marked by having Commander-in-Chief U.S. Atlantic Fleet, CINCLANTFLT acting also as the Commander-in-Chief United States Atlantic Command between 1947 and 1985. CINCLANTFLT, in addition to the LANTCOM post, also held the position of NATO's Supreme Allied Commander Atlantic (SACLANT). There were also Army and Air Force components, CINCARLANT and CINCAFLANT; these posts were allocated to Commanding General, CONARC, and Commander, Tactical Air Command, during the Cuban Missile Crisis.

The beginning of the Congo Crisis in mid 1960 shift planners' attention to potential tasks in Central Africa. In November 1960, the Secretary of Defense gave CINCLANT the responsibility for sub-Saharan Africa plans and operations, and instructed CINCLANT to establish a small headquarters, Joint Task Force 4, under an Army lieutenant general. Lieutenant General Louis W. Truman served as Commander JTF-4. Several months later, in response to a JCS request, Secretary Robert S. McNamara changed the Unified Command Plan's wording so that CINCLANT no longer bore responsibility for "routine" matters in sub-Saharan Africa but was, instead, responsible for contingency planning and for commanding any JCS-directed operations. In July 1961 Secretary McNamara apportioned sub-Saharan responsibilities as follows: Military Assistance Program (MAP) to USCINCEUR and the Secretary of the Army, Congo air evacuation to USCINCEUR, and the Congo sea evacuation to CINCLANT.

After the end of the Cold War, a 1993 reorganization gave the Command a new acronym, USACOM, and brought United States Army Forces Command and Air Combat Command under its authority. In 1999, USACOM was renamed and given a new mission as United States Joint Forces Command (USJFCOM). USJFCOM was closed in 2011.

== List of Combatant Commanders ==
No.	Image	Name	Start of Term	End of Term	Notes
1.		Adm. William H. P. Blandy, USN	3 February 1947	1 February 1950	
2.		Adm. William M. Fechteler, USN	1 February 1950	15 August 1951	
3.		Adm. Lynde D. McCormick, USN	15 August 1951	12 April 1954	
4.		Adm. Jerauld Wright, USN	12 April 1954	28 February 1960	
5.		Adm. Robert L. Dennison, USN	28 February 1960	30 April 1963	
6.		Adm. Harold P. Smith, USN	30 April 1963	30 April 1965	
7.		Adm. Thomas H. Moorer, USN	30 April 1965	17 June 1967	
8.		Adm. Ephraim P. Holmes, USN	17 June 1967	30 September 1970	
9.		Adm. Charles K. Duncan, USN	30 September 1970	31 October 1972	
10.		Adm. Ralph W. Cousins, USN	31 October 1972	30 May 1975	
11.		Adm. Isaac C. Kidd Jr., USN	30 May 1975	30 September 1978	
12.		Adm. Harry D. Train II, USN	30 September 1978	30 September 1982	
13.		Adm. Wesley L. McDonald, USN	30 September 1982	27 November 1985	
14.		Adm. Lee Baggett Jr., USN	27 November 1985	22 November 1988	
15.		Adm. Frank B. Kelso II, USN	22 November 1988	18 May 1990	
16.		Adm. Leon A. Edney, USN	18 May 1990	13 July 1992	
17.		Adm. Paul D. Miller, USN	13 July 1992	31 October 1994	
18.		Gen. John J. Sheehan, USMC	31 October 1994	24 September 1997	
19.		Adm. Harold W. Gehman Jr., USN	24 September 1997	7 October 1999	continued to serve as Commander of U.S. Joint Forces Command until 5 September 2000
