= Westmanland, Maine =

Town in Maine, United States

- Town
- Location of Westmanland, Maine
- Coordinates: 46°59′23″N 68°14′24″W
- Country: United States
- State: Maine
- County: Aroostook

Area
  - Total: 36.45 sq mi (94.41 km^{2})
  - Land: 35.60 sq mi (92.20 km^{2})
  - Water: 0.85 sq mi (2.20 km^{2})
- Elevation: 722 ft (220 m)

Population (2020)
  - Total: 79
  - Density: 2.3/sq mi (0.9/km^{2})
- Time zone: UTC-5 (Eastern (EST))
  - Summer (DST): UTC-4 (EDT)
- ZIP code: 04783
- Area code: 207
- FIPS code: 23-83540
- GNIS feature ID: 582807

Westmanland is a town in Aroostook County, Maine, United States. The population was 79 at the 2020 census.

== Geography ==
According to the United States Census Bureau, the town has a total area of 36.45 square miles (94.41 km^{2}), of which 35.60 square miles (92.20 km^{2}) is land and 0.85 square miles (2.20 km^{2}) is water.

== History ==
Starting in 1870, a Swedish-immigrant colony was established by the State of Maine in Aroostook County. On March 23, 1870, the Maine State Legislature passed an Act authorizing a Board of Immigration and William W. Thomas, Jr. was named Commissioner of Immigration. Thomas went to Sweden, recruited immigrants and led them first into New Sweden township followed by the townships of Westmanland and Stockholm.

In 1879 the first group of immigrants settled in Westmanland. Victor Lindberg, from the Swedish province of Västmanland, arrived in the area of Westmanland during 1881. He is credited with naming the new plantation Westmanland when it was organized June 1, 1892.

== Demographics ==
Historical population
Census	Pop.	Note	%±
1890	52		—
1900	100		92.3%
1910	104		4.0%
1920	101		−2.9%
1930	87		−13.9%
1940	105		20.7%
1950	77		−26.7%
1960	46		−40.3%
1970	52		13.0%
1980	53		1.9%
1990	72		35.8%
2000	71		−1.4%
2010	62		−12.7%
2020	79		27.4%
U.S. Decennial Census

=== 2010 census ===
As of the census of 2010, there were 62 people, 31 households, and 19 families living in the town. The population density was 1.7 inhabitants per square mile (0.7/km^{2}). There were 102 housing units at an average density of 2.9 per square mile (1.1/km^{2}). The racial makeup of the town was 98.4% White and 1.6% Native American.

There were 31 households, of which 12.9% had children under the age of 18 living with them, 54.8% were married couples living together, 6.5% had a female householder with no husband present, and 38.7% were non-families. 32.3% of all households were made up of individuals, and 6.4% had someone living alone who was 65 years of age or older. The average household size was 2.00 and the average family size was 2.47.

The median age in the town was 55 years. 16.1% of residents were under the age of 18; 0% were between the ages of 18 and 24; 16.1% were from 25 to 44; 46.8% were from 45 to 64; and 21% were 65 years of age or older. The gender makeup of the town was 54.8% male and 45.2% female.

=== 2000 census ===
As of the census of 2000, there were 71 people, 33 households, and 17 families living in the town. The population density was 2.0 people per square mile (0.8/km^{2}). There were 123 housing units at an average density of 3.4 per square mile (1.3/km^{2}). The racial makeup of the town was 94.37% White and 5.63% Native American.

There were 33 households, out of which 24.2% had children under the age of 18 living with them, 42.4% were married couples living together, 9.1% had a female householder with no husband present, and 45.5% were non-families. 33.3% of all households were made up of individuals, and 6.1% had someone living alone who was 65 years of age or older. The average household size was 2.15 and the average family size was 2.83.

In the town, the population was spread out, with 19.7% under the age of 18, 2.8% from 18 to 24, 25.4% from 25 to 44, 32.4% from 45 to 64, and 19.7% who were 65 years of age or older. The median age was 46 years. For every 100 females, there were 115.2 males. For every 100 females age 18 and over, there were 119.2 males.

The median income for a household in the town was $30,750, and the median income for a family was $33,750. Males had a median income of $22,917 versus $23,750 for females. The per capita income for the town was $13,551. There were 15.0% of families and 8.3% of the population living below the poverty line, including no one under eighteen and 37.5% of those over 64.

== Notable person ==
- Adm. Gregory G. Johnson, former commander U.S. Naval Forces, Europe and Allied Forces, Southern Europe

== Other sources ==
- Lenentine, Charlotte The Swedish People of Northern Maine (University of Maine. 1950)
- Hede, Richard Maine's Swedish Colony 1870–1970 Centennial Book (1970)
