= Thomas Hinman Moorer =

United States senior admiral (1912–2004)

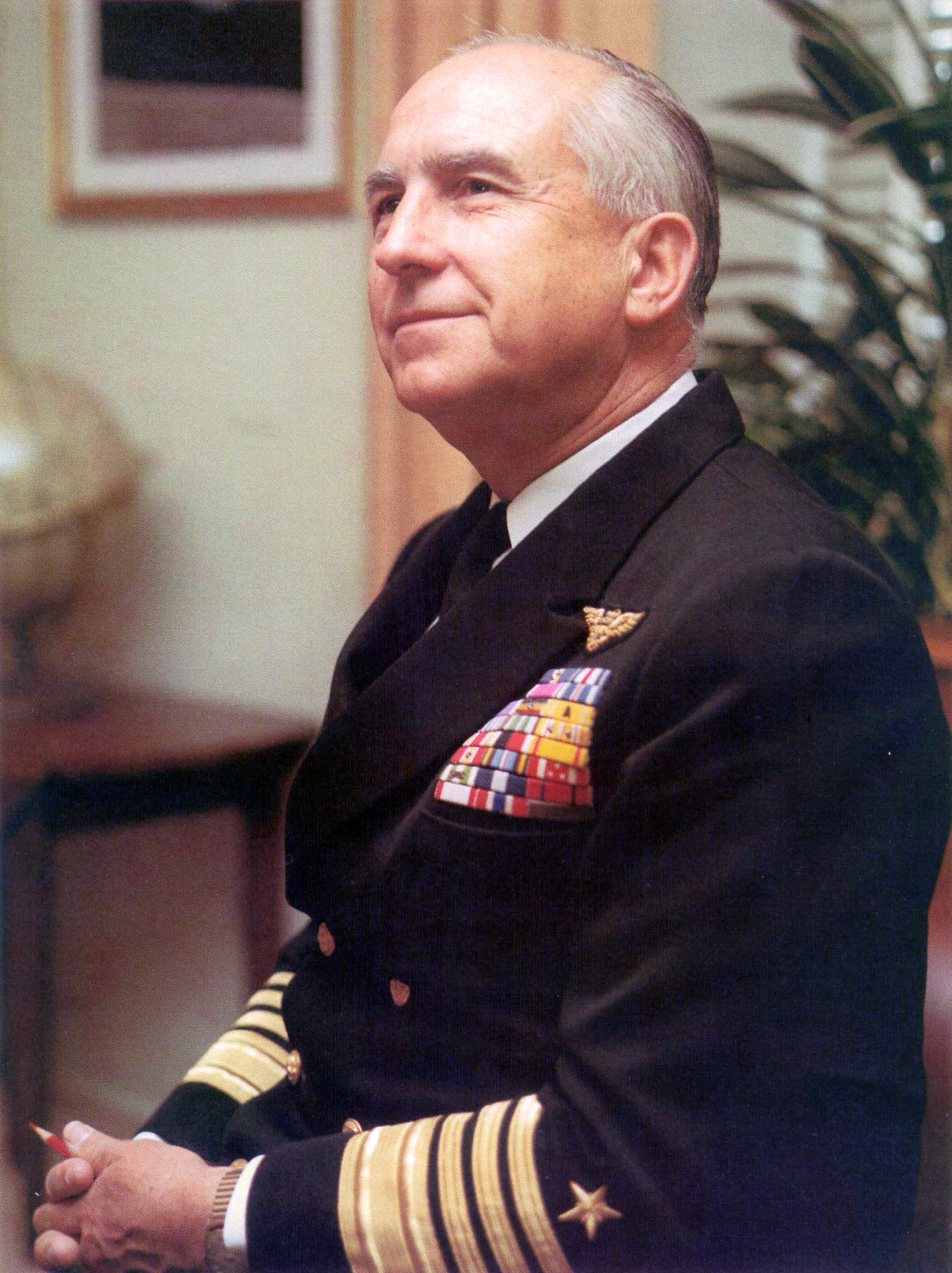
- Admiral Thomas H. Moorer, U.S. Navy
- Born: February 9, 1912; Mount Willing, Alabama, U.S.
- Died: February 5, 2004 (aged 91); Bethesda, Maryland, U.S.
- Resting place: Arlington National Cemetery
- Military career
- Allegiance: United States
- Branch: United States Navy
- Service years: 1933–1974
- Rank: Admiral
- Commands: Chairman of the Joint Chiefs of Staff; Chief of Naval Operations; Supreme Allied Commander Atlantic; United States Atlantic Command; United States Atlantic Fleet; United States Pacific Fleet; United States Seventh Fleet; USS Salisbury Sound
- Conflicts: World War II; Vietnam War
- Awards: Defense Distinguished Service Medal (2); Navy Distinguished Service Medal (5); Army Distinguished Service Medal; Air Force Distinguished Service Medal; Silver Star; Legion of Merit; Distinguished Flying Cross; Gray Eagle Award

Thomas Hinman Moorer (February 9, 1912 – February 5, 2004) was an admiral and naval aviator in the United States Navy who served as the 18th chief of Naval Operations from 1967 to 1970 and 7th chairman of the Joint Chiefs of Staff from 1970 to 1974. He famously accused President Lyndon B. Johnson of having covered up that the 1967 attack on the USS Liberty by Israel and claimed that it was a deliberate act. He was implicated in the Moorer-Radford Affair, having received thousands of classified documents stolen from President Richard Nixon's National Security Council.

== Early life, education, and ancestry ==
Moorer was born in Mount Willing, Alabama, on February 9, 1912. His father, a dentist, named his son for his favorite professor at Atlanta-Southern Dental College, Dr. Thomas Hinman. Moorer was raised in Eufaula, Alabama, with his siblings, including his brother Joseph, who would also become a Navy Admiral.

On March 31, 1970 he became a member of the Alabama Society of the Sons of the American Revolution (SAR). He was assigned national SAR member number 99,634 and Alabama Society number 759. He was later awarded the Society's Gold Good Citizenship Medal. He was also a member of the Naval Order of the United States.

== Naval career ==
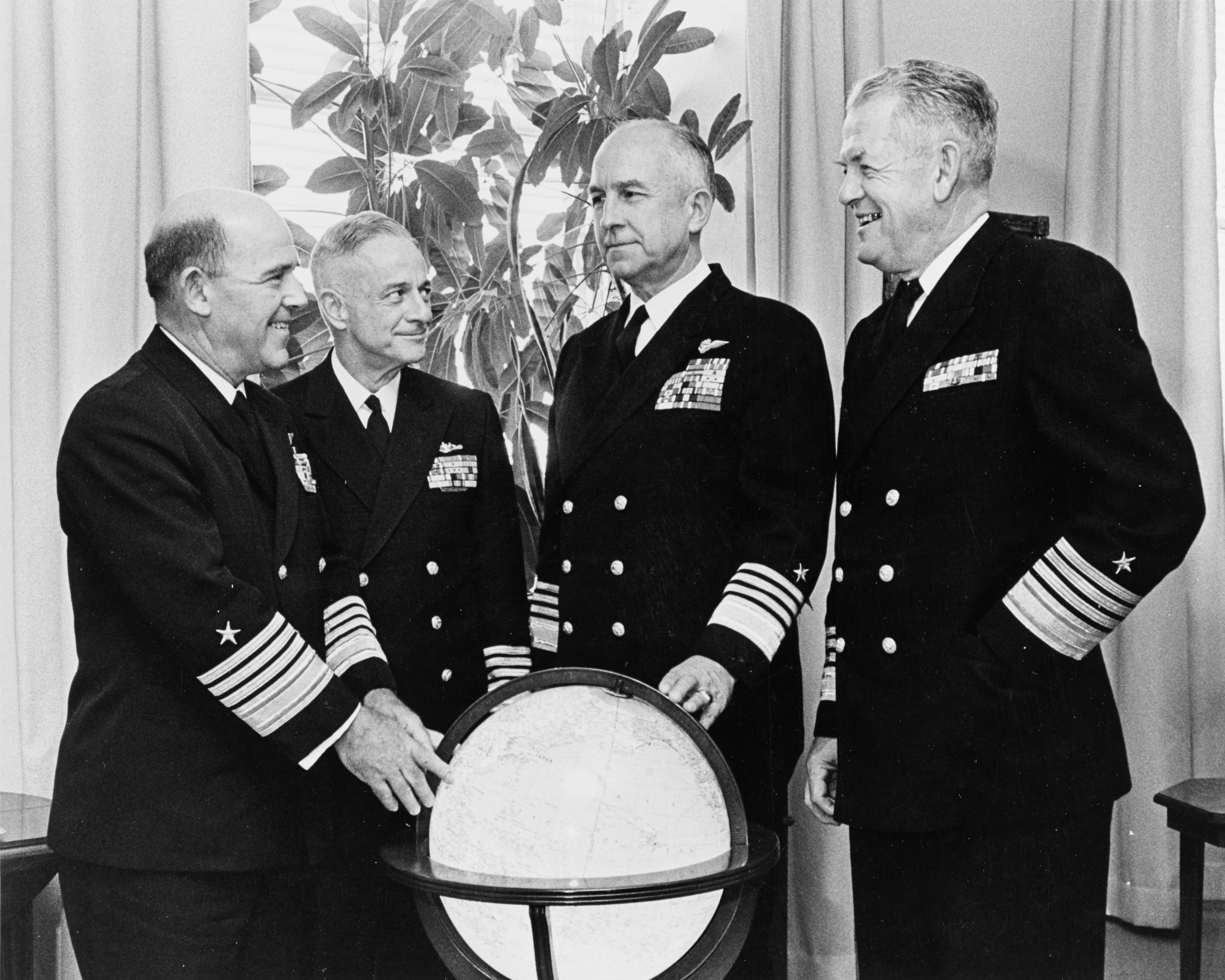
Senior U.S. Navy commanders pose around an illuminated globe in 1968: Admirals John J. Hyland, John S. McCain, Jr., Chief of Naval Operations Moorer, and Ephraim P. Holmes.

Moorer graduated from the United States Naval Academy on June 1, 1933 and was commissioned an ensign. After completing Naval Aviation training at the Pensacola Naval Air Station in 1936, he flew with fighter squadrons based on the aircraft carriers USS Langley, USS Lexington and USS Enterprise.

=== World War II ===
In addition to his carrier-based fighter experience, Moorer also qualified in seaplanes and flew with a patrol squadron in the early years of World War II. Serving with Patrol Squadron Twenty-Two at Pearl Harbor, Hawaii, when the Japanese Empire attacked on December 7, 1941 Moorer's account of Pearl Harbor attack has been published under the title "A Patrol in the wrong direction". His squadron subsequently participated in the 1941–42 Dutch East Indies Campaign in the southwest Pacific, where he flew numerous combat missions. Moorer received a Purple Heart after being shot down and wounded off the coast of Australia on 19 February 1942. He then survived an attack on the freighter which rescued him and his crew, Florence D., which was bombed and sunk the same day by enemy aircraft involved in the first Bombing of Darwin. Moorer also received the Distinguished Flying Cross for his valor three months later when he braved Japanese air superiority to fly supplies into, and evacuate wounded out of, the island of Timor.

=== Vietnam War ===
External audio
- You may watch an interview with Thomas Moorer about his experiences serving during the Vietnam War

Promoted to vice admiral in 1962, and to admiral in 1964, Moorer served both as Commander-in-Chief of the United States Pacific Fleet and Commander-in-Chief of the United States Atlantic Fleet — the first Navy officer to have commanded both fleets. Moorer was Commander-in-Chief of the Pacific Fleet at the time of the Gulf of Tonkin incident and ordered an internal investigation into the conflicting reports which emerged following the event.

Moorer served as Chief of Naval Operations between 1967 and 1970, at the height of U.S. involvement in Vietnam, when he worked closely with the most senior officers in the U.S. military and government.

=== Attack on the USS Liberty ===
Moorer came to the conclusion that the attack on the USS Liberty in 1967 was a deliberate act on the part of the Israelis, and that President Lyndon B. Johnson ordered a cover-up to maintain ties with Israel. Moorer stated that "Israel attempted to prevent the Liberty's radio operators from sending a call for help by jamming American emergency radio channels. [And that] Israeli torpedo boats machine-gunned lifeboats at close range that had been lowered to rescue the most-seriously wounded." Moorer stated that there had been a conspiracy to cover up the event and asked whether "our government put Israel's interests ahead of our own? If so, Why? Does our government continue to subordinate American interests to Israeli interests?" In a 1983 interview, Moorer said: "I've never seen a President – I don't care who he is – stand up to them [the Israelis]. It just boggles your mind. They always get what they want. The Israelis know what is going on all the time. I got to the point where I wasn't writing anything down. If the American people understood what a grip those people have got on our government, they would rise up in arms. Our citizens don't have any idea what goes on."

Admiral Moorer was present at the Medal of Honor presentation ceremony for the Liberty’s commanding officer, Captain William L. McGonagle. Captain McGonagle was presented the award by Secretary of the Navy Paul Ignatius away from the White House, which broke with longstanding tradition of such awards being presented by the President of the United States in a public ceremony (McGonagle's Medal of Honor is the only one to be awarded in such a manner). Admiral Moorer explained this was because the attack on the USS Liberty had been covered-up by the incumbent presidential administration.

Moorer told The Washington Post in 1991: "To suggest that they couldn't identify the ship is…ridiculous… Anybody who could not identify the Liberty could not tell the difference between the White House and the Washington Monument." Moorer remained an outspoken advocate for Liberty survivors: "It's ridiculous to say this was an accident. There was good weather, she was flying the U.S. flag and the planes and torpedo boats attacked over a long period of time. I think Congress should investigate the incident, even now." Moorer wrote in 1997: "I have never believed that the attack on the USS Liberty was a case of mistaken identity. That is ridiculous. I have flown over the Atlantic and Pacific oceans, thousands of hours, searching for ships and identifying all types of ships at sea. The Liberty was the ugliest, strangest-looking ship in the U.S. Navy. As a communications intelligence ship, it was sprouting every kind of antenna. It looked like a lobster with all those projections moving every which way. Israel knew perfectly well that the ship was American."

It took Moorer's personal intervention to reverse a U.S. Naval Academy decision to not include the names of two Liberty crew members who were killed in action on a memorial wall at Bancroft Hall. The crew members in question were Lieutenant Commander Philip Armstrong Jr. and Lieutenant Stephen Toth. Moorer angrily commented on the Academy's attempt to omit the names: "I intervened and was able to reverse the apparent idea that dying in a cowardly, one-sided attack by a supposed ally is somehow not the same as being killed by an avowed enemy."

On the 24th anniversary of the attack (in 1991), Moorer attended a ceremony at the White House meant to honor Liberty survivors. Many were in attendance, including Captain William McGonagle. Instead of President George H. W. Bush greeting the survivors, which was expected, White House Chief of Staff John H. Sununu and National Security Adviser Brent Scowcroft greeted them. Moorer described it as "very emotional."

In 2003, Moorer headed an unofficial independent commission to investigate the details of the USS Liberty incident. The commission determined, among other things, that the state of Israel had deliberately attacked an American ship in international waters, killing 34 U.S. sailors in the process and perpetrating an act of war. Also participating in the commission was Marine General Raymond G. Davis, Rear Admiral Merlin Staring, and former U.S. Ambassador to Saudi Arabia James E. Akins. The so-called Moorer Commission submitted their findings to the United States government along with a request for a proper Congressional investigation of the attack. No additional investigation has been conducted.

Less than a month before his death (in 2004), Moorer made another call for an investigation into the USS Liberty incident and an end to the “disgraceful” cover-up.

=== Chairman of the Joint Chiefs of Staff ===
Moorer served as the Chairman of the Joint Chiefs of Staff from 1970 until 1974.

While Chairman of the Joint Chiefs of Staff, Moorer personally masterminded the 1972 mining of Hai Phong Harbor and believed that if such an operation had been conducted in 1964 it would have "made a significant difference in the outcome of the war."

Excerpts from Moorer's diary during his time as Chairman of the Joint Chiefs of Staff have been declassified, and include a note about an Air Force general telling the Joint Chiefs of Staff during a 1971 meeting that in a nuclear war the United States “could lose two hundred million people and still have more than we had at the time of the Civil War.” In December 1972, President Nixon ordered Operation Linebacker II, better known as the Christmas Bombings, saying to Moorer on 14 December: "I don't want any more of this crap about the fact that we couldn't hit this target or that one. This is your chance to use military power to win this war, and if you don't, I'll hold you responsible".

While chairman, Moorer was fed a steady diet of confidential documents that had been stolen by a Joint Chiefs of Staff spy ring within the White House overseen by Admiral Robert Welander, the JCS liaison officer to the National Security Council. Welander was supplied with documents stolen by Navy Yeoman Charles Radford from White House desks and burn bags and the briefcases of Henry Kissinger and Gen. Alexander Haig, among other places in the White House. The spy ring operated for about 13 months before being uncovered by Nixon aide John Ehrlichman. Welander and Radford admitted to the thefts, felonies under the Espionage Act. Welander and Radford eventually were transferred to remote military outposts. Attorney General John Mitchell informed Moorer that the administration knew of the spy ring, but Nixon, apparently concerned about the potential political fallout, ordered that no prosecution take place.

Upon completion of his second two-year term as CJCS, Moorer retired from the Navy on July 1, 1974.

== Death and legacy ==
In an interview with the journalist Stanley Karnow in 1981, Moorer expressed much bitterness about how the Vietnam War was fought, saying: "We should have fought in the north, where everyone was the enemy, where you didn't have to worry whether or not you were shooting friendly civilians. In the south, we had to cope with women concealing grenades in their brassieres, or in their baby's diapers. I remember two of our Marines being killed by a youngster who they were teaching to play volleyball. But Lyndon Johnson didn't want to overthrow the North Vietnamese government. Well, the only reason to go to war is to overthrow a government you don't like".

Moorer died on February 5, 2004, at the U.S. Naval Hospital in Bethesda, Maryland at the age of 91. He is buried at Arlington National Cemetery.

The National Guard Armory (Fort Thomas H. Moorer Armory) in Fort Deposit, Alabama is named after Moorer, as is a middle school in Eufaula, Alabama.

== Dates of rank ==
Ensign	Lieutenant (junior grade)	Lieutenant	Lieutenant Commander	Commander	Captain
O-1	O-2	O-3	O-4	O-5	O-6
June 1, 1933	June 1, 1936	November 23, 1940	October 1, 1942	April 27, 1944	January 1, 1952

Rear Admiral (lower half)	Rear Admiral (upper half)	Vice Admiral	Admiral
O-7	O-8	O-9	O-10
Never held	August 1, 1958	October 5, 1962	June 26, 1964

- At the time of Admiral Moorer's promotion, all rear admirals wore two stars, but the rank was divided into an "upper" and "lower half" for pay purposes

== Awards and decorations ==
=== U.S. military personal decorations, unit awards, campaign awards ===
Naval Aviator badge
Defense Distinguished Service Medal with bronze oak leaf cluster
Navy Distinguished Service Medal with four gold award stars
Army Distinguished Service Medal
Air Force Distinguished Service Medal
Silver Star
Legion of Merit
Distinguished Flying Cross
Purple Heart
Presidential Unit Citation with one service star
China Service Medal
American Defense Service Medal with A Device
American Campaign Medal
Asiatic-Pacific Campaign Medal with two stars
European-African-Middle Eastern Campaign Medal
World War II Victory Medal
Navy Occupation Service Medal with Europe and Asia Clasps
National Defense Service Medal with bronze star
Armed Forces Expeditionary Medal
Vietnam Service Medal with one service star
Philippine Defense Medal
Vietnam Campaign Medal

=== Foreign orders and decorations ===
He also has been decorated by thirteen foreign governments:

- Portugal (Military Order of Aviz, Grand Cross);
- Greece (Silver Star Medal, First Class);
- Japan (Order of Double Rays of the Rising Sun)
- Japan (First Class of the Grand Cordon of the Order of the Rising Sun);
- Republic of China (Precious Tripod (Pao-Ting) Medal with Red Grand Cordon)
- Republic of China (Order of Cloud and Banner (Yun Hui) with Special Grand Cordon);
- Philippine Legion of Honor (Rank of Commander)
- Brazil (Order of the Naval Merit, Grande Official);
- Chile (Gran Estrella al Merito Militar);
- Venezuela (Order of Naval Merit 1st Class);
- Republic of Korea (Order of National Security Merit, 1st Class);
- Netherlands (Grand Cross, Order of Orange-Nassau with Swords);
- Federal Republic of Germany (Commander's Cross of the Order of Merit);
- Italy (Military Order of Italy, Knight of the Grand Cross);
- Spain (Grand Cross of the Order of Naval Merit);
- Norway (Grand Cross of the Order of St. Olav).

=== Civilian awards ===
- Stephen Decatur Award for Operational Competence by the Navy League of the United States (May 1964)
- Honorary Doctor of Laws Degree awarded by Auburn University (1968)
- General William Mitchell Award, Wings Club of New York City (February 1968)
- Member, Alabama Academy of Honor (August 1969)
- Honorary Doctor of Humanities Degree awarded by Samford University (May 1970)
- Frank M. Hawks Award for Outstanding Contributions to the Development of Aviation by the American Legion Air Service Post 501, New York City (January 1971)
- The Gray Eagle Award presented at the Washington Navy Yard (June 29, 1972)
- Gold Good Citizenship Medal, Sons of the American Revolution
- National Aviation Hall of Fame (1987)
- The Lone Sailor Award by the U. S. Navy Memorial Foundation (1989)
- The National Football Foundation Gold Medal (1990)
- The Alabama Men’s Hall of Fame (2018)

== Bibliography ==
- Gibson, Charles Dana; Gibson, E. Kay (July 2008), "Attempts to Supply The Philippines by Sea: 1942" (PDF), The Northern Mariner, XVIII (3/4): 163, doi:10.25071/2561-5467.342, S2CID 247350567
- Karnow, Stanley (1983). Vietnam: A History. Viking. ISBN 0-1400-7324-8.
- Stillwell, Paul (1981). Air Raid: Pearl Harbor! Recollections of a Day of Infamy. US Naval Institute. ISBN 0-87021-086-6.
- Office of the Assistant Secretary of Defense (Public Affairs) (February 5, 2004). "Death of Retired U.S. Navy Adm. Thomas M. Moorer" (Press release). U.S. Department of Defense. Archived from the original on February 7, 2004.
- Clarence A. (Mark) Hill Jr (24 February 2004). "Thomas Hinman Moorer". Archived from the original on 2004-12-05.

Military offices
Preceded by U.S. Grant Sharp, Jr.	Commander in Chief of the United States Pacific Fleet; 1964–1965	Succeeded by Roy L. Johnson
Preceded by Harold Page Smith	Supreme Allied Commander Atlantic; 1965–1967	Succeeded by Ephraim P. Holmes
Preceded by Harold Page Smith	Commander in Chief of the United States Atlantic Command; 1965–1967	Succeeded by Ephraim P. Holmes
Preceded by Harold Page Smith	Commander in Chief of the United States Atlantic Fleet; 1965–1967	Succeeded by Ephraim P. Holmes
Preceded by David L. McDonald	Chief of Naval Operations; 1967–1970	Succeeded by Elmo R. Zumwalt
Preceded by Earle G. Wheeler	Chairman of the Joint Chiefs of Staff; 1970–1974	Succeeded by George S. Brown
