= John Lee (blues musician) =

American songwriter

- Born: John Arthur Lee; May 24, 1915; Mount Willing, Alabama, United States
- Died: October 11, 1977 (aged 62) Montgomery, Alabama, United States
- Genres: Country blues
- Occupations: Guitarist, pianist, singer, songwriter
- Instruments: Guitar, piano, vocals
- Years active: 1930s–1977
- Labels: Federal Records, Rounder Records

John Arthur Lee (May 24, 1915 – October 11, 1977) was an American country blues guitarist, pianist, singer and songwriter. He recorded two singles released by Federal in 1952 and, despite a period of 13 years away from music, Lee was 'rediscovered' and recorded an album released on Rounder in 1974.

His most notable track, "Down at the Depot", was described as a "masterpiece".

== Biography ==
Lee was born in Mount Willing, Alabama, United States, in a family whose members all played the guitar. Lee's tuition in slide guitar playing was enhanced by his uncle, Ellie Lee, who was a resident of Evergreen, Alabama, and locally renowned for his proficiency of playing using a knife as the slide. Lee was further inspired listening to recordings made by Blind Blake, Blind Lemon Jefferson and Leroy Carr. After playing at juke joints and house parties in the 1930s, by 1945 Lee had relocated to Montgomery, Alabama. His country blues playing and singing soon became popular around the city, as over the next few years Lee monopolized house parties and fish suppers.

In 1951, when Lee was listening to WMGY, he heard the talent scout and record producer, Ralph Bass, appeal for local musical talent to come forward. Lee passed the audition, and six tracks were recorded in July 1951 in Montgomery, which were all produced by Bass. These were "Baby's Blues," "Down at the Depot," "Alabama Boogie," "Blind's Blues," "Slappin' The Boogie," and "In My Father's House". Two of the tracks, "Slappin' The Boogie" and "In My Father's House", were unreleased at the time, although both were later issued on a compilation album, Devil's Jump : Important Indie Label Blues 1946-1957 (2013). However, two singles were released by Federal Records in 1952. His single releases bore the name 'Charles Wernsing' in the song writing credits. The issues represented some of the final recordings of country blues ever released on a major record label. Lee mainly utilised 'Vestapol' referring to an open D major tuning for the guitar, common in finger-style guitar in country and folk music. One journalist noted that "few post-war country blues merit the description 'masterpiece' but John Lee's July 1951 recording of 'Down at the Depot' does".

By 1960, Lee had retired from active performing. He was later sought out by the blues researcher, Gayle Dean Wardlow, who finally located Lee in 1973, after a hunt lasting three years. In 1975, Wardlow wrote an article about the search processes in the Blues Unlimited magazine, titled "Down at the Depot: The Story of John Lee". Lee was offered the chance to record again. The album was partly recorded at the Travel Lodge in Montgomery, Alabama, on October 2 and 3, 1973, produced by Dick Spottswood; and at the Physical World, Cambridge, Massachusetts, on May 5, 1974, produced by Stephan Michelson. The album's liner notes were partly written by Wardlow. Three of the tracks produced by Michelson, "You Know You Didn't Want Me", the instrumental "Lonesome Blues", and "Dago Hill", featured Lee playing the piano rather than the guitar. The album, Down at the Depot, was issued by Rounder Records in 1974; it was re-released on CD in 1990. The collection contained largely Lee's own work, plus a version of a song published in 1922, "Nobody's Business What I Do", written by Porter Grainger and Everett Robbins.

Following the album's release and therefore during Lee's effective comeback, he performed at Boston's Down East Festival and the National Folk Festival in Washington, D.C.

Lee died on October 11, 1977, in Montgomery, at the age of 62. He was buried at Brassell Cemetery in Montgomery.

== Legacy ==
Part of the liner notes written by Simon Napier for a compilation album, The Post-War Blues Volume 3 : Eastern And Gulf Coast States (1966), stated "John Lee, whose numbers are notable for some of the best picking to be heard on post-war blues wax!".

Lee's song, "Down at the Depot", was played on BBC Radio 1 by John Peel on October 13, 1986.

A copy of the original 78 rpm vinyl disc of Lee's single containing "Blind's Blues", was purchased in 2018 for $250.

== Discography ==
=== Singles ===
Year	Title (A-side / B-side)	Record label			
Year	Title (A-side / B-side)	Record label	1952	"Down at the Depot" / "Alabama Boogie"	Federal
1952	"Baby's Blues" / "Blind's Blues"	Federal			

=== Albums ===
Year	Title	Record label
1974	Down at the Depot	Rounder

== See also ==
- List of country blues musicians
