= U.S. Naval Activities, United Kingdom =

Commander, U.S. Naval Activities, United Kingdom (COMNAVACTUK) was an echelon three command subordinate to the Commander in Chief, U.S. Naval Forces, Europe until 2007. As the regional area coordinator for the United Kingdom and Northern Europe, COMNAVACTUK also exercised authority over the following activities:

- U.S. Naval Air Facility, Mildenhall
- U.S. Navy Exchange, West Ruislip
- U.S. Naval Medical Clinics, United Kingdom
- U.S. Marine Corps Security Force Company, London

US Naval Activities, London was established in 1951 by the direction of the Chief of Naval Operations as a union of two shore commands; US Naval Activities in London, and US Naval Facility, London. The functions assigned these two commands had been previously performed by the Headquarters Command, Commander in Chief, Eastern Atlantic and Mediterranean (CINCNELM). Personnel assigned upon this establishment were largely drawn from the CINCNELM staff.

In 1958, the US Naval Facility, London was designated as the US Naval Support Activity, London. As other Naval activities in the United Kingdom and Northwestern Europe were established, the command was designated by the Secretary of the Navy to its present title of US Naval Activities, United Kingdom (NAVACTUK). In August 1965, the US Naval Support Activities, London was disestablished and reassigned to COMNAVACTUK, consolidating the support activity and old facility into one command.

CNAUK was disbanded on 14 September 2007 at RAF Daws Hill.
