= Wallace M. Beakley =

United States Navy Vice admiral

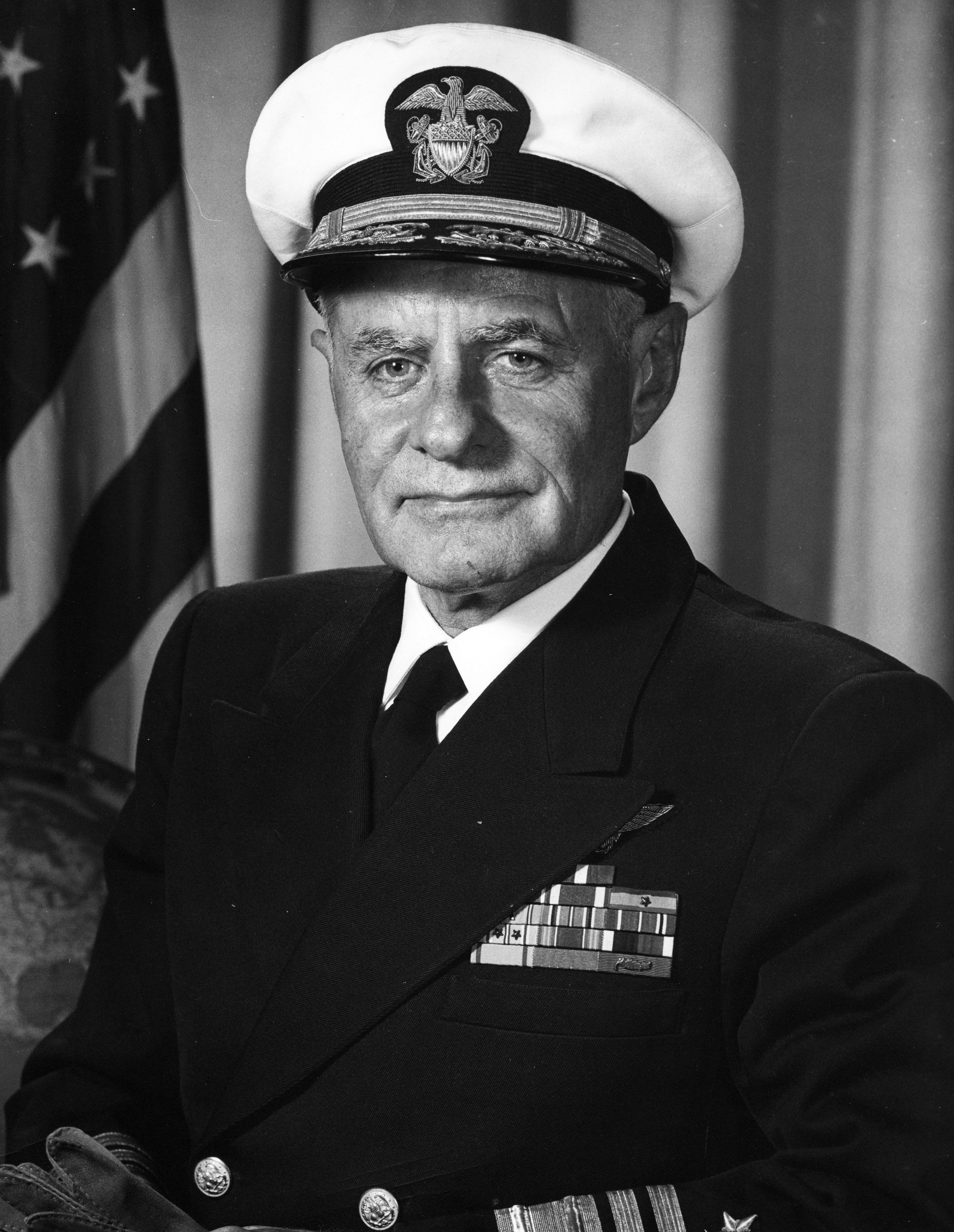
- Vice Admiral Wallace M. Beakley, 1963
- Born: Wallace Morris Beakley; January 20, 1903; Vineland, New Jersey
- Died: January 16, 1975 (aged 71); Alexandria, Virginia, U.S.
- Military career
- Allegiance: United States
- Branch: U.S. Navy
- Service years: 19xx–1964
- Rank: Vice admiral
- Conflicts: World War II; Battle of the Eastern Solomons
- Awards: Navy Cross; Legion of Merit; Distinguished Service Medal

Wallace Morris Beakley (January 20, 1903 – January 16, 1975) was an American naval aviator, diplomat, commander of the United States Seventh Fleet, deputy chief of naval operations, and vice admiral in the United States Navy. He served as vice chief of naval operations for Atlantic Fleet (now U.S. Fleet Forces Command) and commander in chief for Western Atlantic until he retired from the U.S. uniformed services in 1964.

== Education ==
Beakley was born in Vineland, New Jersey. He graduated from the United States Naval Academy and subsequently attended Naval Postgraduate School before attending the California Institute of Technology (Caltech). Beakley attended Army Industrial College, National War College and Naval War College where he studied Aeronautical Engineering with BSc and MSc degrees. On 24 November 1926 after completing his education, he was designated a naval aviator in the U.S. navy.

== Naval career ==
Beakley entered the U.S. navy as a naval officer and was then promoted to the rank of rear admiral. During his career, he commanded several battleships and destroyers, including USS Utah (BB-31) battleship of Utah and Mahan-class destroyers. He was assigned to the Lexington-class aircraft carrier which he commanded for two years from 1935 to 1937. He was later appointed as an engineer and executive officer of Patrol Squadron 14-F warship. Beakley's next assignment was the Bureau of Aeronautics (BuAer) and United States Department of the Navy. In July 1941, he was assigned to command the fifth squadron for USS Yorktown warship. After the World War II broke out, he served at various posts, including executive officer of carrier air wing and Pacific Fleet for Washington, D.C.

In August 1945, he was appointed at naval task force where he commanded a bogue-class escort carrier, and later served as instructor at the National War college. In July 1947, Beakley served a member of the Joint staff, and subsequently member of Joint Chiefs of Staff at The Pentagon. He also commanded midway-class aircraft carrier of the navy for a year. After serving at aircraft carrier, he was reappointed to the office of the Chief of Naval Operations and served as assistant director for aviation as well as General Planning Group. Later in July 1953, Beakley was appointed as commander at United States Naval Forces Central Command (Middle East Force), and in 1954, he was assigned to command the anti-submarine warfare manned by hunter-killer team at Atlantic Fleet.

It was July 1955 when he returned again to the office of the chief of naval operations and assumed the office as assistant director for Strategic Plans Division, and on 7 May 1956, he was appointed as assistant chief of naval operations for Plans and Policy branch as part of his additional duty assignment. In 1957 he served as commander of the Seventh Fleet upon reaching to the temporary rank vice admiral. In November 1958, Beakley assumed navy office as vice chief of naval operations. Later on 21 September 1961, he was appointed as deputy commander-in-chief for Atlantic Fleet, and later, commander-in-chief for Western Atlantic. On 9 September 1953, he served with additional duty as commander of the Naval Base stationed at Massachusetts. At that time, he was promoted to the rank of three-star vice admiral and retired from the navy department on 1 January 1964.

== Death ==
In January 1975, Beakley was found dead in Alexandria, Virginia which was his hometown. The New York Times stated in its report that Beakley probably committed suicide by shooting himself.

== Awards and decorations ==

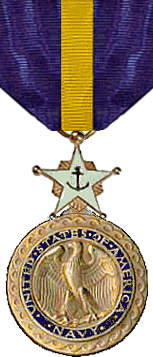

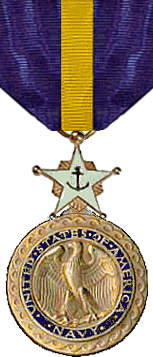

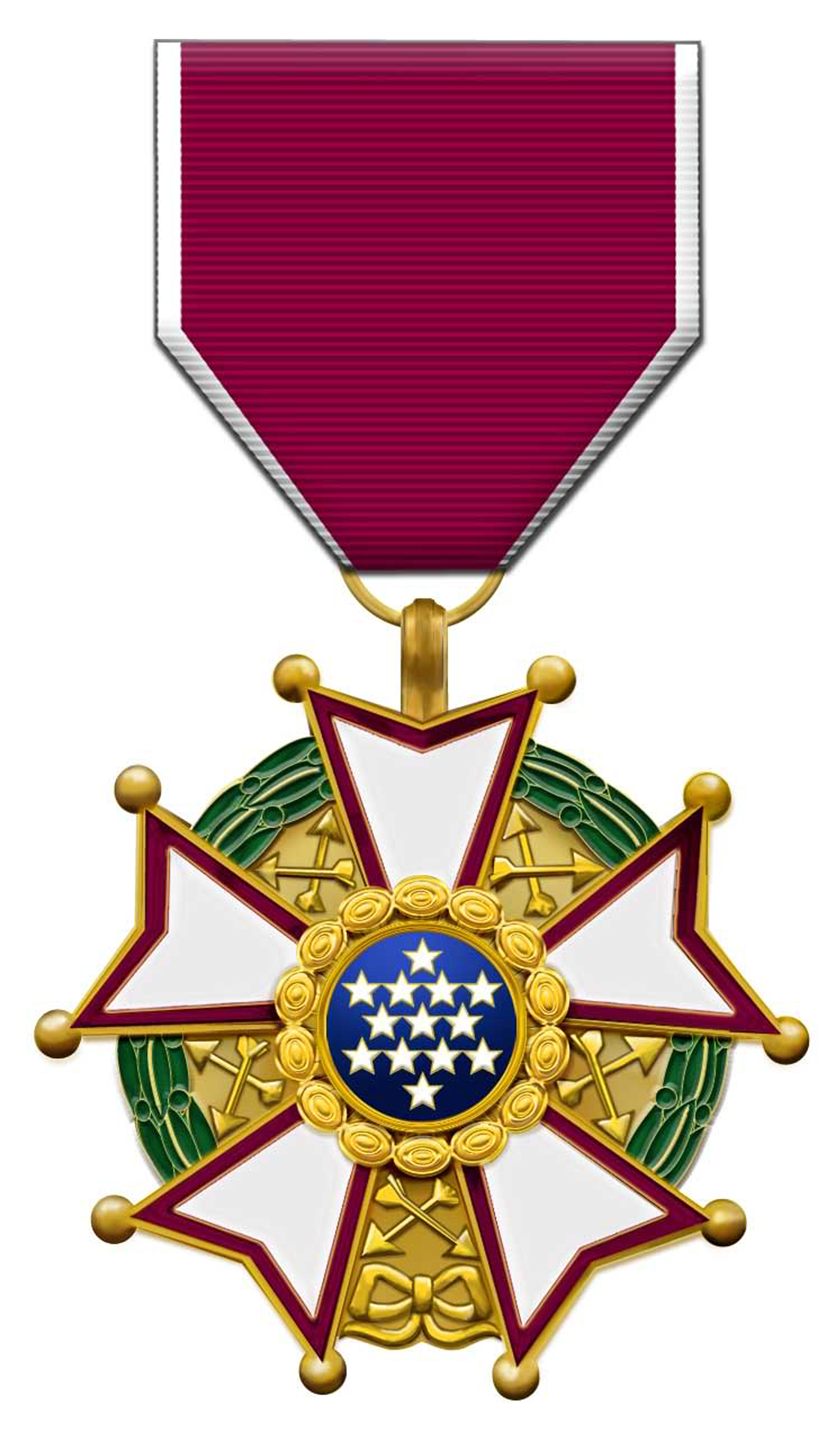

Naval Aviator Badge
Legion of Merit	Navy Cross	Distinguished Service Medal
