= Mount Willing, Alabama =

Unincorporated community in Alabama, United States

- Unincorporated community
- Location within Alabama Location within the United States
- Coordinates: 32°03′37″N 86°42′05″W
- Country: United States
- State: Alabama
- County: Lowndes
- Elevation: 302 ft (92 m)
- Time zone: UTC-6 (Central (CST))
  - Summer (DST): UTC-5 (CDT)
- Area code: 334
- GNIS feature ID: 123417

Mount Willing is an unincorporated community in Lowndes County, Alabama, United States. It lies at an elevation of 302 feet (92 m).

== Notable people ==
- Thomas Hinman Moorer (1912–2004), naval admiral
- John Lee (1915–1977), country blues musician

== Demographics ==
Historical population
Census	Pop.	Note	%±
1890	231		—
U.S. Decennial Census

Mount Willing appears in multiple U.S. census records, including 1870 and 1880.
