= Richard Antrim =

US Navy Medal of Honor recipient (1907–1969)

Richard Nott Antrim
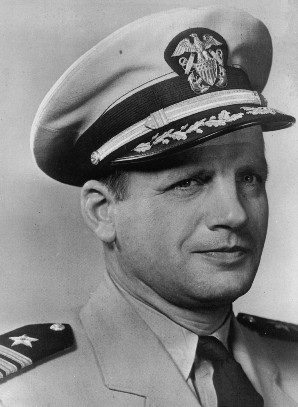
- Born: December 17, 1907; Peru, Indiana, US
- Died: March 7, 1969 (aged 61); Mountain Home, Arkansas, US
- Burial place: Arlington National Cemetery
- Military career
- Allegiance: United States of America
- Branch: United States Navy
- Service years: 1926–1954
- Rank: Rear admiral
- Commands: USS Turner (DD-834); USS Montrose (APA-212)
- Conflicts: World War II; Pacific War; Naval Battle of Balikpapan; Battle of Badung Strait; Battle of the Java Sea (POW)
- Awards: Medal of Honor; Navy Cross; Bronze Star Medal w/ "V" device; Purple Heart

Richard Nott Antrim (December 17, 1907 – March 7, 1969) was an officer in the United States Navy who received the United States' highest military decoration—the Medal of Honor—for his actions as a prisoner of war during World War II. He retired in 1954 as a rear admiral.

== Early life and career ==
Antrim was born in Peru, Indiana, and entered Naval Reserve in 1926. He received an appointment to the United States Naval Academy in 1927 and graduated on June 4, 1931. He married Mary Jean Packard shortly before he graduated. He served briefly in the 11th Naval District before reporting to the battleship USS New York as fire control officer. Detached from that battleship in April 1932, he received flight instruction at the Naval Air Station (NAS), Pensacola, Florida, before serving consecutive tours of sea duty on the USS Salinas, USS Nitro and USS Trenton.

Subsequently, ordered to the Bethlehem Steel Corporation in Quincy, Massachusetts, Antrim assisted in fitting out USS Portland and after her commissioning, served as a division officer in that heavy cruiser until the spring of 1936. After that time, he became assistant first lieutenant in USS Crowninshield before undergoing instruction in lighter-than-air (LTA) flight at NAS Lakehurst, New Jersey. Antrim subsequently received his naval aviator (LTA) designation, qualified for duty as an airship, kite, or free-balloon pilot. In the spring of 1938, Antrim arrived on the Asiatic Station and served as executive officer of USS Bittern before joining USS Pope in December 1939, as her executive officer. The outbreak of war in the Pacific Ocean in December 1941 found Antrim still serving in that capacity.

== World War II ==
During her brief wartime career, Pope played a significant part in three major engagements fought by the venerable Asiatic Fleet destroyers—the battles of Balikpapan, Badung Strait, and the Java Sea.

In the former, Pope delivered close-range attacks that momentarily helped to delay the Japanese landings at Balikpapan. During the action, Lieutenant Antrim selected targets for his guns and torpedoes, placing his shots accurately in the midst of a large Japanese convoy and thus inflicting damage to several enemy ships. After the Battle of Badung Strait, Pope's commanding officer, Commander Welford C. Blinn, reported that his executive officer was "highly deserving of commendation for the meritorious performance of his several duties before and throughout the action." Citing Antrim as a "ready assistant in navigation fire control, and torpedo fire," Blinn recommended him not only for a destroyer command but for a "decoration deemed appropriate." Antrim later received a Navy Cross for this service.

The Battle of the Java Sea (27 to February 28, 1942) ended all Allied hope of stemming the Japanese onslaught. In the wake of that action, the smashed Allied fleet attempted to escape the cordon of Japanese warships rapidly tightening the noose around Java. Among the small groups was one composed of the British heavy cruiser HMS Exeter, the destroyer HMS Encounter, and Pope.

The ships slipped out of Surabaya, Java, on the evening of February 28, but were spotted the next day by Japanese aircraft. A surface force of cruisers and destroyers located the fleeing trio, and a fierce action ensued, with Exeter and Encounter after having put up a stiff fight, going down under a deluge of Japanese shells. Pope, however, fought on, managing to make a temporary haven in a passing rain squall.

Unfortunately, the destroyer—an Asiatic Fleet flush decker "old enough to vote"—could not elude her pursuers. Ultimately, damaged by Japanese bombs, from aircraft summoned from the Japanese carrier Ryūjō, and by shells from the Japanese force, Pope began to sink, but not before all but one of her men had reached safety in life rafts and the destroyer's sole motor whaleboat. Antrim, wounded in the action, helped to gather the life rafts around the boat to facilitate the distribution of what meager supplies were available to the men. His devotion to duty during the ordeal inspired and sustained his shipmates' morale.

== Prisoner of war ==
For three days and nights, Pope's survivors stuck together as a group until picked up by a Japanese warship and handed over to Japanese Army authorities at Makassar, in the Celebes Islands.

During the early part of his imprisonment at Makassar in April 1942, Antrim saw a Japanese guard brutally beating an American prisoner of war, Lt.(jg) Allan Jack Fisher, (SC), and successfully intervened, at great risk to his own life. For his conspicuous act of valor, Antrim later received the Medal of Honor.

Subsequently, when the Japanese forced Antrim to take charge of a labor detail assigned the task of constructing slit trenches for protection during air raids, he carefully rearranged the construction work plans approved by the Japanese and gained their approval of his own ideas. Under the eyes of their captors, the POWs dug the slit trenches correctly, but in a curious pattern recognizable from the air as a giant US which clearly and craftily identified the occupants of the trenches. This audacious action possibly saved hundreds of prisoners of war from mistaken bombings by Allied planes. Antrim carried out the plan in spite of the fact that discovery of his trick would have resulted in instant beheading. For this, Antrim received a Bronze Star.

== Post-war activities ==
Ultimately liberated after the war in the Far East ended in August 1945, Antrim returned to the United States and enjoyed rehabilitation leave before attending the Repatriated POW Refresher Course at the Washington Navy Yard, Washington, D.C. in May 1946. He then brushed up on his pilot training at NAS Lakehurst and later completed a course at the Naval War College. Antrim—who had been listed as missing since the sinking of Pope in March 1942—received the Medal of Honor and Bronze Star Medal from President Harry S. Truman in ceremonies at the White House on January 30, 1947.

Later, following a brief stint at the Fleet Sonar School, San Diego, California, in June and July 1947, Antrim went to sea in command of the destroyer USS Turner. He next underwent further instruction at NAS Lakehurst, before assuming the duties of Assistant for Lighter-than-Air Planning and Programs Office of the Chief of Naval Operations (CNO), Washington, D.C., in December 1948.

Following further Washington duty—with the Policy Advisory Staff, Department of State, and the Psychological Strategy Board—Antrim commanded the attack transport USS Montrose during the Korean War before returning to the capital for a brief tour of duty as Head, Amphibious Warfare Matters Section, Office of the CNO, prior to his retirement on April 1, 1954. He was advanced to rear admiral on the retired list on the basis of his combat awards.

== Later life ==
Rear Admiral Antrim died in Mountain Home, Arkansas on March 7, 1969. He was buried at Arlington National Cemetery, in Arlington, Virginia.

== Awards and decorations ==
His decorations include:

Badge	Surface Warfare Officer Insignia		
Badge	Naval Aviator Badge		
1st Row	Medal of Honor		Navy Cross
2nd Row	Bronze Star w/ Valor device	Purple Heart	Combat Action Ribbon with one 5/16" Gold Star
3rd Row	Navy Presidential Unit Citation	Army Presidential Unit Citation	Prisoner of War Medal
4th Row	China Service Medal with one campaign star	American Defense Service Medal with Fleet Clasp	American Campaign Medal
5th Row	Asiatic-Pacific Campaign Medal with two campaign stars	World War II Victory Medal	Navy Occupation Service Medal with 'ASIA' clasp
6th Row	National Defense Service Medal	Korean Service Medal with two campaign stars	Republic of Korea Presidential Unit Citation
7th Row	Philippine Defense Medal	United Nations Korea Medal	Republic of Korea War Service Medal
Foreign Awards	Netherlands Bronze Lion Medal		

=== Medal of Honor citation ===
For conspicuous gallantry and intrepidity at the risk of his life above and beyond the call of duty while interned as a prisoner of war of the enemy Japanese in the city of Makassar, Celebes, Netherlands East Indies, in April 1942. Acting instantly on behalf of a naval officer who was subjected to a vicious clubbing by a frenzied Japanese guard venting his insane wrath upon the helpless prisoner, Comdr. (then Lt.) Antrim boldly intervened, attempting to quiet the guard and finally persuading him to discuss the charges against the officer. With the entire Japanese force assembled and making extraordinary preparations for the threatened beating, and with the tension heightened by 2,700 Allied prisoners rapidly closing in, Comdr. Antrim courageously appealed to the fanatic enemy, risking his own life in a desperate effort to mitigate the punishment. When the other had been beaten unconscious by 15 blows of a hawser and was repeatedly kicked by 3 soldiers to a point beyond which he could not survive, Comdr. Antrim gallantly stepped forward and indicated to the perplexed guards that he would take the remainder of the punishment, throwing the Japanese completely off balance in their amazement and eliciting a roar of acclaim from the suddenly inspired Allied prisoners. By his fearless leadership and valiant concern for the welfare of another, he not only saved the life of a fellow officer and stunned the Japanese into sparing his own life but also brought about a new respect for American officers and men and a great improvement in camp living conditions. His heroic conduct throughout reflects the highest credit upon Comdr. Antrim and the U.S. Naval Service.

== Posthumous honor ==
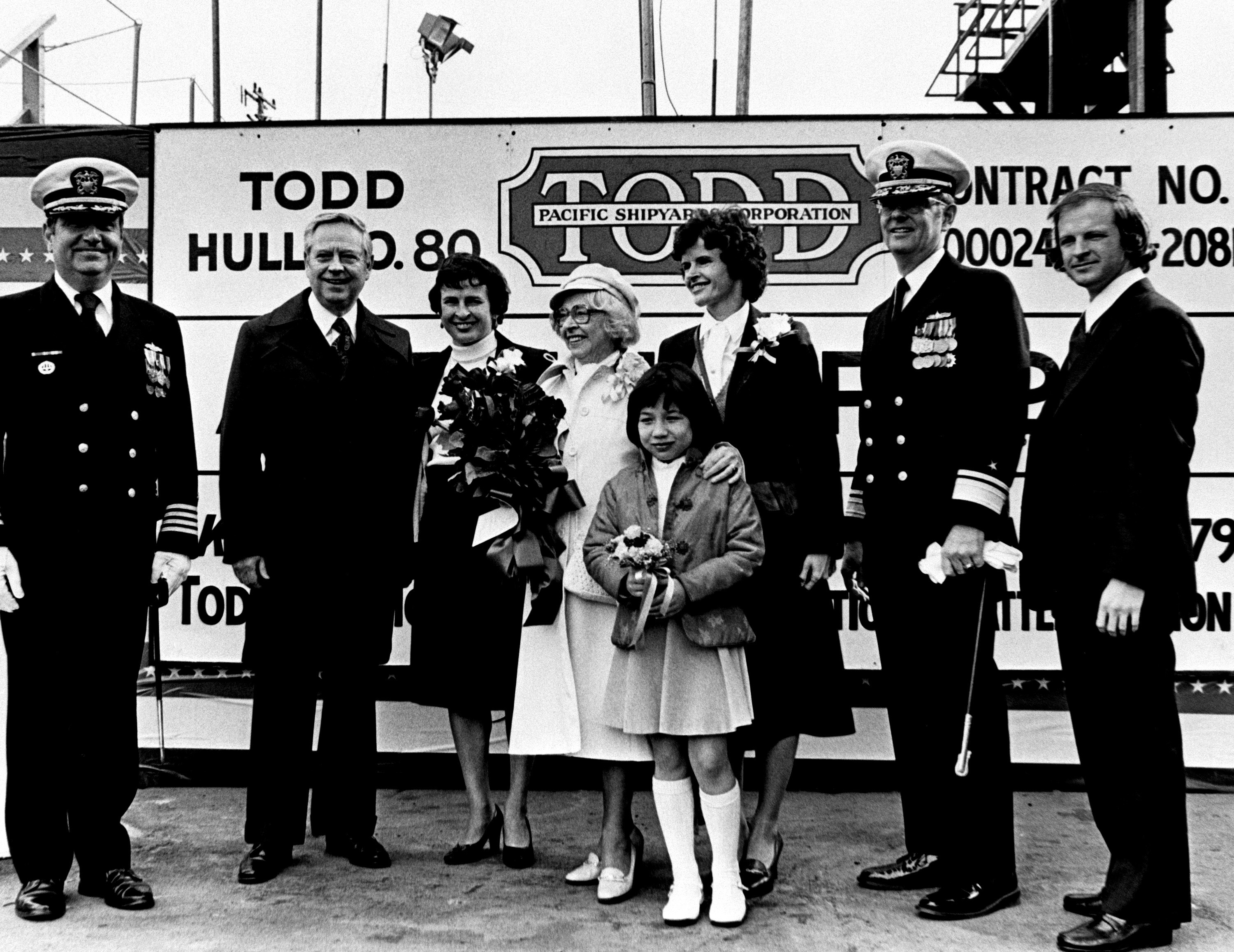
Members of Antrim's family attended the USS Antrim (FFG-20) launching ceremony. His wife is at center in light-colored clothing.

In 1979, the USS Antrim (FFG-20) was named in his honor.

== See also ==
- List of Medal of Honor recipients for World War II
