= USS Turner =

USS Turner may refer to the following ships of the United States Navy:

- USS Turner (DD-259), a Clemson-class destroyer commissioned in 1919; converted to a water barge in 1936 as USS Moosehead (IX-98) in 1943; scrapped in 1947
- USS Turner (DD-506), a planned Stevenson-class light destroyer; contract was cancelled in 1941
- USS Turner (DD-648), a Gleaves-class destroyer commissioned in 1943 and destroyed by internal explosions in 1944
- USS Turner (DD-834), a Gearing-class destroyer commissioned in 1945 and decommissioned in 1969

== See also ==
- USS Turner Joy (DD-951)
- USS Richmond K. Turner (CG-20)
