= TCG Giresun =

TCG Giresun is the name of the following ships of the Turkish Navy, named for the city of Giresun:

- TCG Giresun (D 345), ex-USS McCalla (DD-488), a Gleaves-class destroyer acquired in 1949, scrapped in 1973
- TCG Giresun (F 491), ex-USS Antrim (FFG-20), a Oliver Hazard Perry-class frigate acquired in 1997, in active service
