= USS Richmond K. Turner =

1963 Leahy-class cruiser

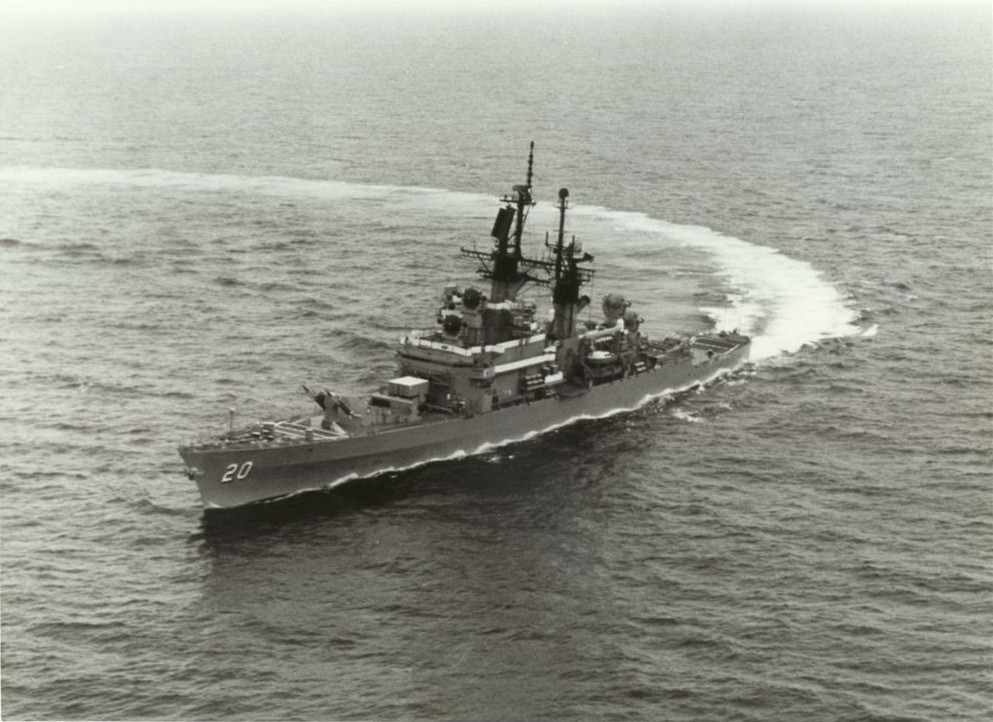
- USS Richmond K. Turner (CG-20)

History

United States
- Name: Richmond K. Turner
- Namesake: Richmond K. Turner
- Builder: New York Shipbuilding Corporation in Camden, New Jersey
- Laid down: 9 January 1961
- Launched: 6 April 1963
- Sponsored by: Mrs. Claude V. Ricketts
- Commissioned: 13 June 1964
- Decommissioned: 31 March 1995
- Reclassified: CG-20 on 30 June 1975
- Stricken: 31 March 1995
- Fate: Sunk as target 9 August 1998 near Puerto Rico
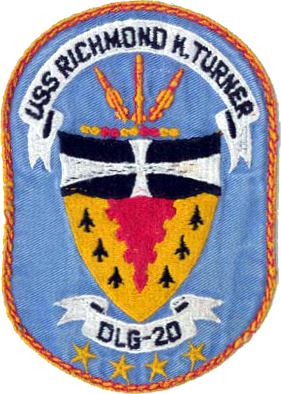
- Badge

General characteristics
- Class & type: Leahy-class cruiser
- Displacement: 7,630 tonnage (full load)
- Length: 533 ft (162 m)
- Beam: 55 ft (17 m)
- Draft: 26 ft (7.9 m)
- Propulsion: 2 shaft; De Laval gear turbines; 4 Foster & Wheeler D Type 1,200 psi (8,300 kPa) boilers; 85,000 shp (63,000 kW)
- Speed: 34 kn (63 km/h; 39 mph)
- Range: 8,000 nmi (15,000 km) at 20 knots (20 mph; 40 km/h)
- Complement: 37 officers and 408 enlisted
- Sensors & processing systems: AN/SPS-49 air search radar; AN/SPS-48 air search radar; AN/SPG-55 fire control radar
- Electronic warfare & decoys: AN/SLQ-32; Mark 36 SRBOC
- Armament: 2× Mark 10 Terrier SAM, 1× ASROC ASW system, 4× 3 in (76 mm)/50 guns, 6× 12.75 in(324 mm)ASW TT,

USS Richmond K. Turner (DLG-20 / CG-20) was a Leahy-class cruiser destroyer leader in the United States Navy. The ship was named for Admiral Richmond K. Turner, who served during World War II.

The keel of Richmond K. Turner was laid on 9 January 1961 by New York Shipbuilding Corporation in Camden, New Jersey. She was one of nine Leahy-class "double-ended" guided missile destroyers. The vessel was launched 6 April 1963; sponsored by Mrs. Claude V. Ricketts; and commissioned 13 June 1964.

== History ==
=== Initial operations ===
The ship departed Philadelphia Naval Shipyard 10 August 1964 for her homeport of San Diego, California, stopping briefly at Yorktown and Norfolk, Virginia, and then Guantanamo Bay, Cuba. She crossed through the Panama Canal, and after a port call in Acapulco, Mexico, arrived in San Diego on 11 September 1964.

Richmond K. Turner departed San Diego on 4 June 1965 for her first deployment to the Western Pacific. The vessel joined Task Force 77 in the South China Sea area and served as missile support ship for the aircraft carriers Coral Sea, Independence, and Oriskany.

=== Vietnam ===
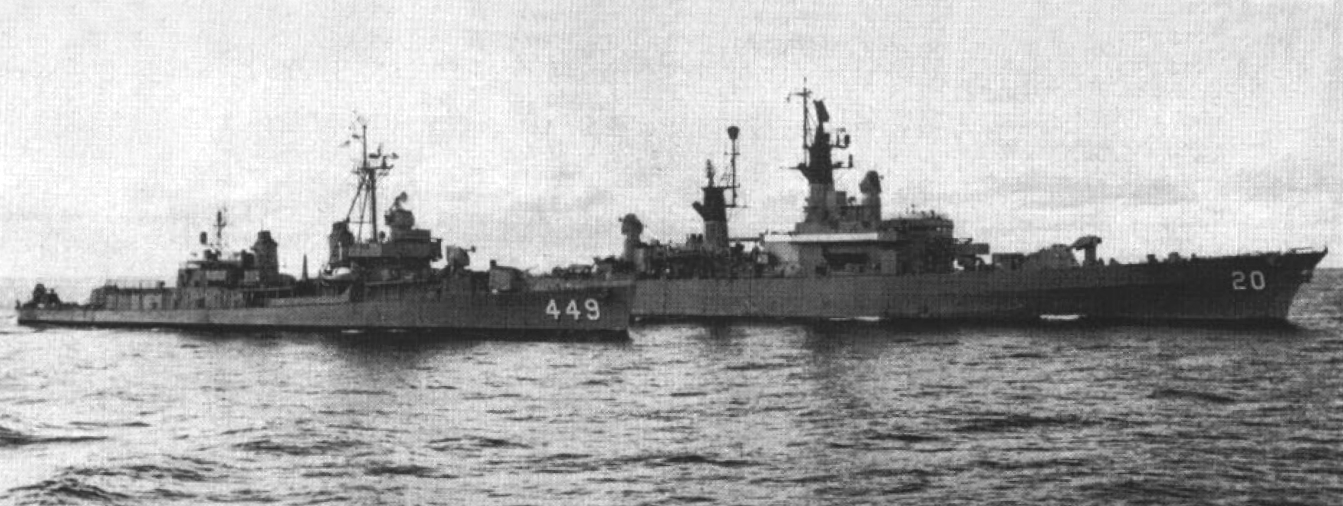
USS Nicholas and USS Richmond K. Turner underway in the South China Sea c.1966.

Richmond K. Turner was reassigned to the Search and Rescue Destroyer Unit in the Tonkin Gulf in September 1965. After participating in missions in which eight aviators were rescued, the vessel departed Subic Bay and arrived at San Diego on 18 December. The ship stood out of San Diego on 15 October 1966, bound a second time for Southeast Asian waters, returning to her homeport on 28 March 1967 and making a midshipman training cruise to Pearl Harbor. Richmond K. Turner departed for her third tour off Vietnam on 10 June 1968, and contributed to Fleet readiness in Asian waters until returning to San Diego in December 1968.

Richmond K. Turner assumed the duty as anti-submarine warfare (ASW) school ship in the southern California operating areas. In February, she conducted a SecNav guest cruise, and on 1 March, she commenced an extensive updating of her shipboard missile systems at the Naval Station San Diego. She then underwent training and further preparations for her fourth WestPac deployment, which commenced in January 1970.

Richmond K. Turner arrived in Yokosuka, Japan, 4 March 1970 and spent two months operating in the Sea of Japan. The warship operated off the coast of Vietnam from June until July 1970 and returned to San Diego in August after stopping at Guam and Pearl Harbor.

=== Refit and Fleet Operations ===
On 22 March 1971, Richmond K. Turner embarked for Bath, Maine and arrived at the Bath Iron Works on 27 April 1971. There, she was decommissioned 5 May, under a Navy-wide program to enhance the anti-air warfare capability of major guided-missile ships. The ship was recommissioned at Bath Iron Works on 27 April 1972.

For seven months, Richmond K. Turner engaged in various trials, exercises, and refresher training along the east coast of the United States and in the Caribbean Sea. The vessel returned to Newport, Rhode Island, 22 November 1972 and remained there until 9 January 1973, when the destroyer leader entered Boston Naval Shipyard for a two-month yard period. Leaving Boston in March, she continued normal operations out of Newport along the Atlantic seaboard and in the Caribbean mid-December 1973. In July 1973, Richmond K. Turner departed for a 5-month deployment as the flagship for UNITAS XIV, returning in mid-December 1973.

In early 1974, Richmond K. Turner's homeport was moved to Norfolk after the Newport Naval Base reassigned most ships there to other locations.

After a lengthy stay in Norfolk, Richmond K. Turner deployed on a Mediterranean cruise in November 1974, returning to Norfolk in May 1975.

Richmond K. Turner was re-designated CG-20 in July 1975 and participated in Operation 200 which included the International Naval Review in New York City for the United States Bicentennial celebration on 4 July 1976.

In September 1978, after an overhaul at the Charleston Naval Shipyard, Richmond K. Turner reported to Fleet Training Center, Guantanamo Bay, Cuba (GTMO) for Refresher Training (REFTRA). The day after arrival Richmond K. Turner was directed to intercept and conduct surveillance of Soviet Naval units operating in the West Indies. With that task completed, the ship was then directed to transit the Panama Canal and conduct surveillance operations off the west coast of Nicaragua. Embarking REFTRA instructors, Richmond K. Turner completed all her training requirements while deployed in an operational status. The ship received the Meritorious Unit Commendation for these operations in March 1979. From March to September 1979, conducted fleet and independent operations with the Sixth Fleet, Richmond K. Turner made port visits to Barcelona, Palma de Mallorca, and Valencia, Spain; Civitavecchia (Rome) and Alassio, Italy; Athens, Greece; and Constanta, Romania on the Black Sea. "Turner" was selected to represent the United States in St. Tropez at the 35th Anniversary of the Allied landings in southern France. In July 1979, "Turner" successfully launched a Harpoon missile in the Gulf of Sidra, destroying the target ship at a range of 78 miles (126 km). This was the first firing of a Harpoon missile from a deployed US Navy ship.

In May 1980 Richmond K. Turner participated in Boston's OPSAIL 80 and may have been awarded a Meritorious Unit Citation for conducting two special operations, but this award is not listed in the US Navy Unit award website. Richmond K. Turner completed four highly successful Mediterranean deployments as part of the U.S. Sixth Fleet, prior to an extensive baseline overhaul at Charleston Naval Shipyard, Charleston, South Carolina from January to December 1982. During this overhaul Richmond K. Turner received numerous updates to modernize her combat systems suite. She was also fitted with the Vulcan Phalanx Close in Weapons System (CIWS) for self-defense against cruise missiles. After this overhaul Richmond K. Turner completed two more Mediterranean deployments. The ship received both Navy Expeditionary Medal and Meritorious Unit Commendation during this employment. During the Action in the Gulf of Sidra against the Libyan navy, the Turner disabled a Libyan patrol boat with a Harpoon missile.

=== Persian Gulf ===
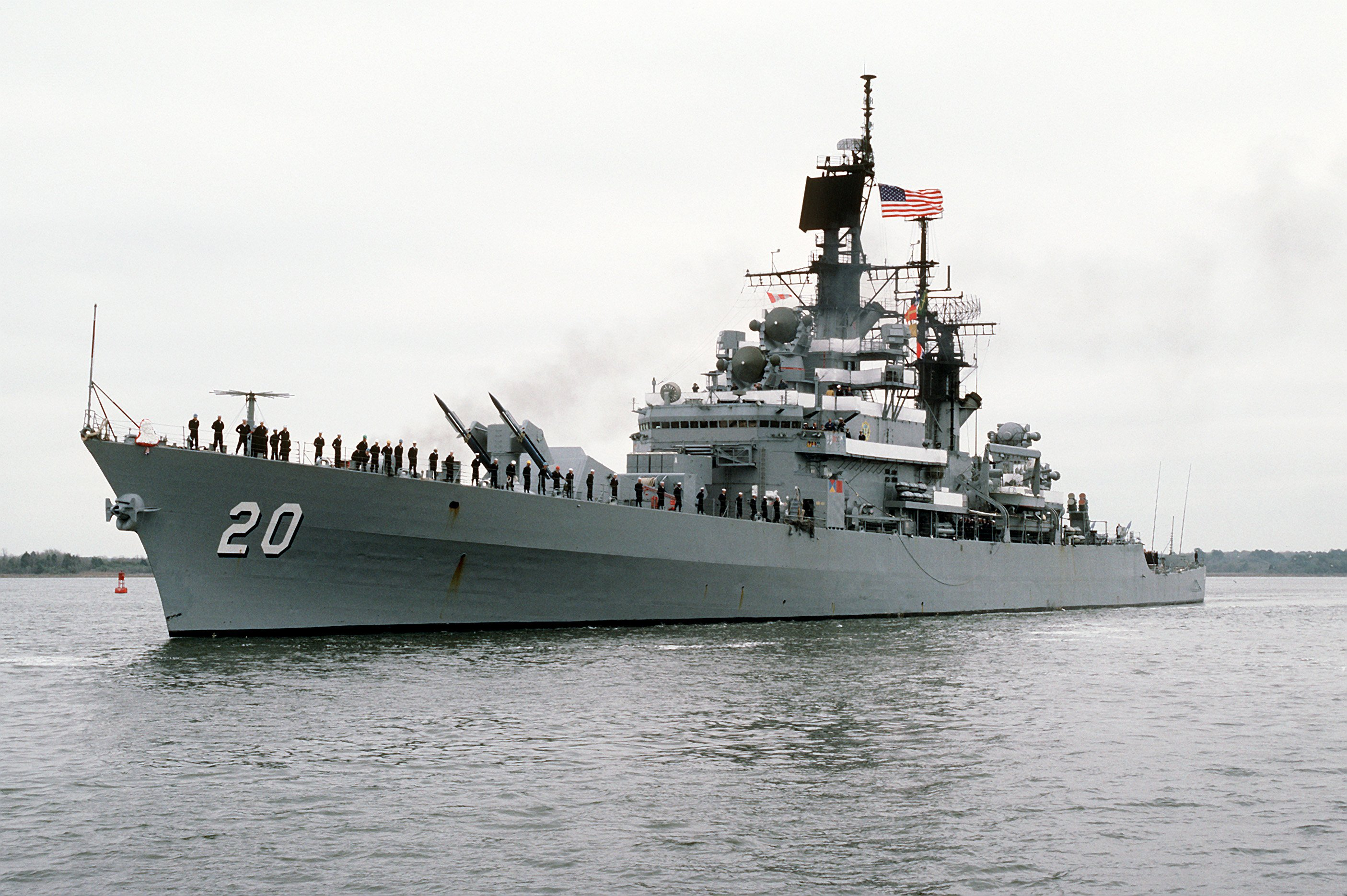
Richmond K. Turner returning to Charleston after 1987-1988 deployment.

Richmond K. Turner also completed a 1988 deployment to the Persian Gulf and was a participant of Operation Earnest Will.

Upon her return to the United States, Richmond K. Turner was overhauled in Ingalls Shipyard at Pascagoula, Mississippi, where she received the New Threat Upgrade (NTU) to her Combat Direction System as well as many engineering improvements.

In response to the crisis in the Persian Gulf caused by Iraq's invasion of Kuwait, Richmond K. Turner deployed early as a primary AAW unit in the Theodore Roosevelt battle group, which arrived in the theater just before hostilities broke out. During 60 days in the Persian Gulf, Richmond K. Turner provided protection to four carriers and served as an advance picket ship in the mine-infested waters off Kuwait. Following the cease fire, Richmond K. Turner relocated to the Red Sea where she participated in the continuing maritime interception operations in support of United Nations sanctions against Iraq.

Escorting the aircraft carrier USS Theodore Roosevelt through the Suez Canal in late April 1991, Richmond K. Turner participated in Operation Provide Comfort, a massive relief effort to help tens of thousands of Kurdish refugees who fled the turmoil of Iraq following that country's defeat in the war. During this time Richmond K. Turner became the Anti-Air Warfare Commander for the Aircraft Carrier Striking Force, U.S. Sixth Fleet.

For her operations during Desert Storm and Operation Provide Comfort, the Secretary of the Navy awarded Richmond K. Turner the Joint Meritorious Unit Award, the Navy Unit Commendation, the National Defense Medal and the Southwest Asia Service Medal and the Combat Action Ribbon.

In January 1993, petty officer 2nd class Joseph Gardner of Richmond K. Turner was the subject of a nationwide manhunt. He was eventually placed on the FBI's 10 most wanted list and was arrested in Philadelphia, October 1994. He was convicted of the 30 December 1993 gang rape and murder of Melissa McLaughlan and was sentenced to death. He was executed in 2008.

=== Bosnia ===
Richmond K. Turner made a final deployment to the Mediterranean as a part of the Theodore Roosevelt battle group and served as an anti-air warfare command during Operation Deny Flight over Bosnia-Herzegovina. Richmond K. Turner received the Armed Forces Service Medal for service relating to Bosnia.

Prior to her decommissioning on 31 March 1995, Richmond K. Turner served as the test platform for the Navy's Lightweight Exo-Atmospheric Projectile (LEAP) Program, firing the first LEAP shot ever and launching the Navy into the future of missile technology.

=== End of career ===
Richmond K. Turner was decommissioned on 13 April 1995 and struck from the Navy list that same day. On 9 August 1998, ex-Richmond K. Turner was sunk as a target near Puerto Rico. The SINKEX was conducted by the USS Enterprise battle group including the cruiser Philippine Sea, destroyers Thorn, Nicholson and Carrier Air Wing 3. The Air Force also dropped three 2,000-pound bombs. Richmond K. Turner sank in nearly 3,000 fathoms (18,000 ft) of water.

== Awards ==
Richmond K. Turner earned eight battle stars for Vietnam service.

List of awards from Navy unit awards site.

- Combat Action Ribbon, for 19 February 1991 to 24 February 1991, Desert Storm
- Joint Meritorious Unit Award, for 5 April 1991 to 16 July 1991 (Awards site says "Fiery", but this may have been for Operation Provide Comfort instead)
- Navy Unit Commendation, for 20 October 1983 to 3 March 1984, Grenada / Operation Urgent Fury and Lebanon time period
- Navy Unit Commendation, for 23 March 1986 to 29 March 1986, Libya, Action in the Gulf of Sidra (1986)
- Navy Unit Commendation, for 17 January 1991 to 7 February 1991, Desert Storm
- Navy Meritorious Unit Commendation, for service from 12 September 1978 to 22 October 1978
- Navy Meritorious Unit Commendation, for service from 1 January 1994 to 31 March 1995
- Navy E Ribbon, for FY1981, FY1982, CY1992, CY1994 and the 27-month period 1 October 1989 to 31 December 1991
- Navy Expeditionary Medal, for Libya during the 20 January 1986 – 27 June 1986 award period, Action in the Gulf of Sidra (1986)
- National Defense Service Medal with one bronze star (two awards)
- Armed Forces Expeditionary Medal, for three occasions relating to Korea in the 1 October 1966 – 3 June 1974 award period
- Armed Forces Expeditionary Medal, for operations relating to Vietnam in the 1 July 1958 – 3 July 1965 award period
- Armed Forces Expeditionary Medal, for 4 occasions relating to Lebanon in the 1 June 1983 – 1 August 1984 award period
- Armed Forces Expeditionary Medal, for Grenada during the 23 October 1983 – 21 November 1983 award period
- Armed Forces Expeditionary Medal, for the Persian Gulf during the 24 July 1987 – 1 August 1990 award period
- Vietnam Service Medal, for several time periods between 1965 and 1970
- Southwest Asia Service Medal, for 14 January 1991 to 20 April 1991, Desert Storm
- Armed Forces Service Medal, for two occasions relating to Bosnia in 1993

== See also ==
- USS Turner
- USS Turner (DD-834) was in service at the same time as Richmond K. Turner. Both Commanding Officers complained to the Chief of Naval Operations about mixed up message traffic and repair parts being sent to the wrong ship due to confusion.
