= Action in the Gulf of Sidra (1986) =

1986 U.S. Navy freedom-of-navigation operation in waters claimed by Libya

- Part of the Cold War
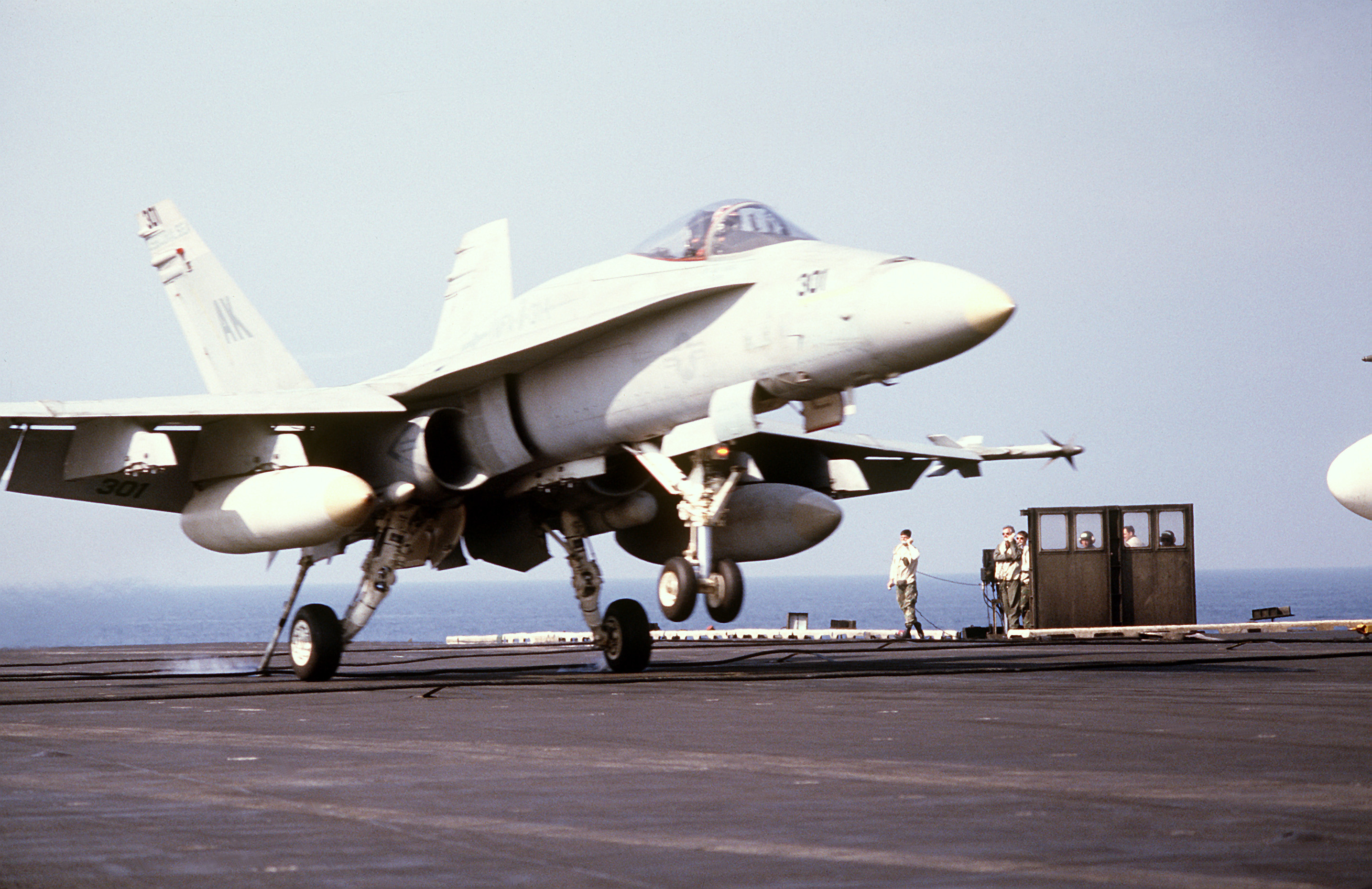
- A VMFA-314 F/A-18A lands on USS Coral Sea
Date	24 March 1986
Location	Gulf of Sidra, Mediterranean Sea
Result	American victory

Belligerents
United States	Libya

Commanders and leaders
(United States) Ronald Reagan (United States) Frank Kelso	(History of Libya under Muammar Gaddafi) Muammar Gaddafi

Strength
30 warships; 225 aircraft	2 missile corvettes; 3 patrol boats

Casualties and losses
None	72 killed; 6 Soviet technicians wounded; 1 corvette sunk; 1 patrol boat sunk; 1 corvette crippled; 1 patrol boat damaged; several SAM sites destroyed or damaged

In the Action in the Gulf of Sidra, codenamed Operation Prairie Fire, the United States Navy deployed aircraft carrier groups in the disputed Gulf of Sidra in the Mediterranean Sea. Libya had claimed that the entire Gulf was their territory, at 32° 30' N, with an exclusive 62 nautical miles (115 km; 71 mi) fishing zone. Libyan leader Muammar Gaddafi asserted this in 1973, and dubbed it "The Line of Death". The United States claimed its rights to conduct Freedom of Navigation (FON) naval operations in international waters, a standard of 12-nautical-mile (22 km; 14 mi) territorial limit from a country's shore. This engagement followed the 1981 Gulf of Sidra incident and preceded another in 1989.

== Background ==
Tensions between the United States and Libya heightened after the hijacking of TWA Flight 847 on 14 June 1985, and the Rome and Vienna airport attacks on 27 December that same year. The United States claimed that the Libyan leader was involved in these actions through his support of the alleged perpetrator, Palestinian terrorist Abu Nidal. At the same time, Libya began the installation of SA-5 Gammon surface-to-air missile batteries and radars they received from the Soviet Union in late 1985, to bolster their air defense. As the United States Navy had done for several years, they challenged Libya's claim to the Gulf of Sidra by crossing the so-called "Line of Death".

After the terrorist attacks in Rome and Vienna, the U.S. Navy began several FON operations in the area around Libya, in an operation named "Attain Document". The first two parts of the operation were held from 26 to 30 January, then 12–15 February, without incident. The third part began on 23 March, with a carrier battle group from the United States Sixth Fleet consisting of the aircraft carriers USS America, USS Coral Sea and USS Saratoga, in addition to five cruisers, twelve destroyers, six frigates, 250 aircraft and 27,000 personnel near the gulf. USS Detroit, USS Seattle (AOE-3), USS Savannah, USS Mount Baker and USNS Sirius were the fuel, ammunition and combat stores (food and supplies) replenishment ships supplying the entire battle group.

Coral Sea and Saratoga had participated in the first two parts of the operation, and were joined by America in mid-March. The aircraft carriers dispersed in an east–west line along the northern edge of Tripoli's Flight Information Region (FIR) approximately 150 nmi (280 km; 170 mi) north of the Line of Death. America conducted flight operations from midnight to noon, Saratoga from noon to midnight, and Coral Sea from 05:30 to 18:30. Reduced coverage during darkness reflected the minimal Libyan night-time flight operations observed during the first two parts of the operation.

Previously, Muammar Gaddafi had made threats that he would shoot down or destroy U.S. aircraft or ships moving over the "Line of Death". According to U.S. Secretary of State George P. Shultz, the United States' position was quite clear; there would be no restriction on U.S. naval movements through international waters. By crossing the "Line of Death", American forces were asserting their right to keep international sea lanes open and "conduct naval and air exercises in every part of the globe." During the operations held in January and February 1986, the United States Navy made 130 intercepts of Libyan fighters in the airspace over the Gulf of Sidra, although neither side opened fire.

== US Naval Forces ==
US Sixth Fleet - Vice Admiral Frank Kelso in command ship USS Coronado

Task Force 60 – Battle Force Zulu - The fleet battle force.

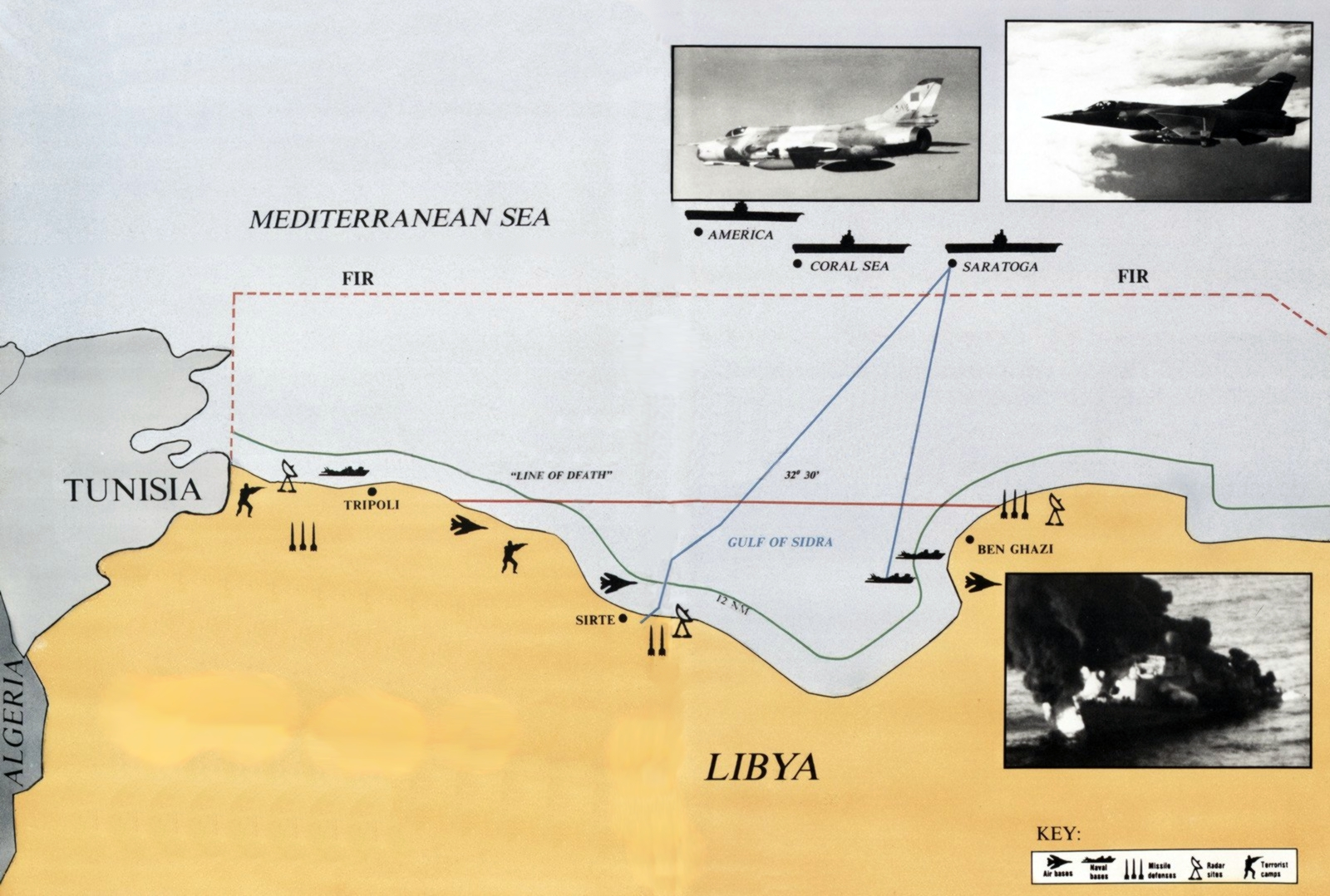
Operation Attain Document III in March 1986.

=== Task Group 60.1 - Coral Sea Carrier Battle Group ===
USS Coral Sea - Aircraft Carrier
USS Yorktown - Aegis Cruiser
USS Richmond K. Turner - Guided Missile Cruiser
USS De Wert - Guided Missile Frigate
USS Donald B. Beary - Frigate
USS Paul - Frigate
USS Ainsworth - Frigate
USS Garcia - Frigate

=== Task Group 60.2 - Saratoga Carrier Battle Group ===
USS Saratoga - Aircraft Carrier
USS Biddle - Guided Missile Cruiser
USS Jack Williams - Guided Missile Frigate
USS Capodanno - Frigate
USS Jesse L. Brown - Frigate

=== Task Group 60.3 - America Carrier Battle Group ===
USS America - Aircraft Carrier
USS Dale - Guided Missile Cruiser
USS Farragut - Guided Missile Destroyer
USS King - Guided Missile Destroyer
USS Halyburton - Guided Missile Frigate
USS Vreeland - Frigate
USS Aylwin - Frigate
USS Pharris - Frigate

=== Task Group 60.5 - Surface Action Group ===
USS Ticonderoga - Aegis Cruiser
USS Scott - Guided Missile Destroyer
USS Caron - Destroyer

== Hostilities ==
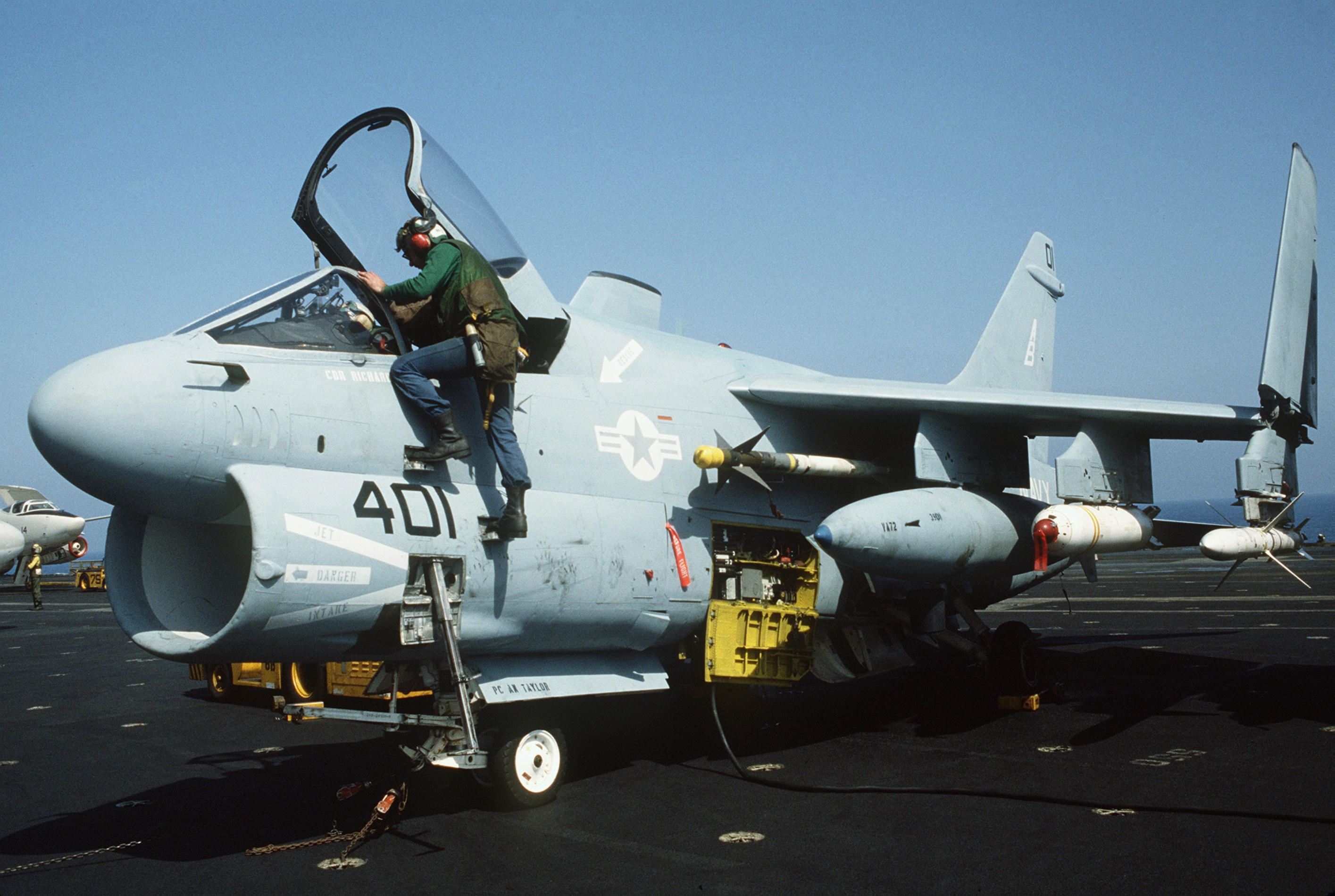
An A-7 aboard USS America during flight operations against Libya in 1986

On 23 March 1986, American aircraft from the three aircraft carriers crossed the "Line of Death" and began operating in the Gulf of Sidra.

On 24 March at 06:00 (CET), USS Ticonderoga, accompanied by two destroyers, USS Scott and USS Caron, moved south of the "Line", covered by fighter aircraft. A Libyan missile installation near Surt (Sirte) launched two Soviet-made SA-5 "Gammon" surface-to-air missiles (SAMs) at 07:52 (CET), toward F-14A Tomcats of America's VF-102. The missiles missed their target and fell harmlessly into the sea. Two additional SA-5 missiles were launched at 13:52 toward F-14s acting as the southernmost combat air patrol (CAP). These missiles were jammed by an EA-6B Prowler; Libyans and their Soviet instructors claimed that those two missiles had hit their targets, which had fallen into the sea, but failed to convince Soviet intelligence and Mikhail Gorbachev.

Two hours later, two MiG-25 Foxbats took off from Benina air base with orders to intercept and shoot down some of the U.S. fighters. Before the Libyan aircraft could get close enough, a U.S. Navy E-2C Hawkeye detected them and alerted two F-14As from VF-33, which intercepted the MiGs at 20,000 feet (6,100 m). The Libyans began aggressive head-on maneuvering in an effort to get into firing position on the two F-14s .

The F-14 wing leader alleged "excessive hostile actions and intentions", which led the air warfare commander aboard USS Saratoga to give the pilots the signal "warning yellow, weapons hold". This meant the F-14s could open fire if necessary. An intense dogfight ensued, though without any missiles being fired. The F-14s dropped to 5,000 feet (1,500 m), where they had a distinct advantage over the MiG-25s and positioned themselves between the sun and the Libyans.

The F-14s moved into a six o'clock position behind the hostile MiGs, locked on to them with radar and acquired AIM-9 Sidewinder tones, which meant they were ready to shoot the Libyans down. The MiGs moved off, seeming to follow a return course to their base. However, one of them reversed course, turning against the F-14s. The F-14 wing leader acquired the MiG, and requested permission to open fire. Before permission could be granted, the MiG-25 turned away and headed south.

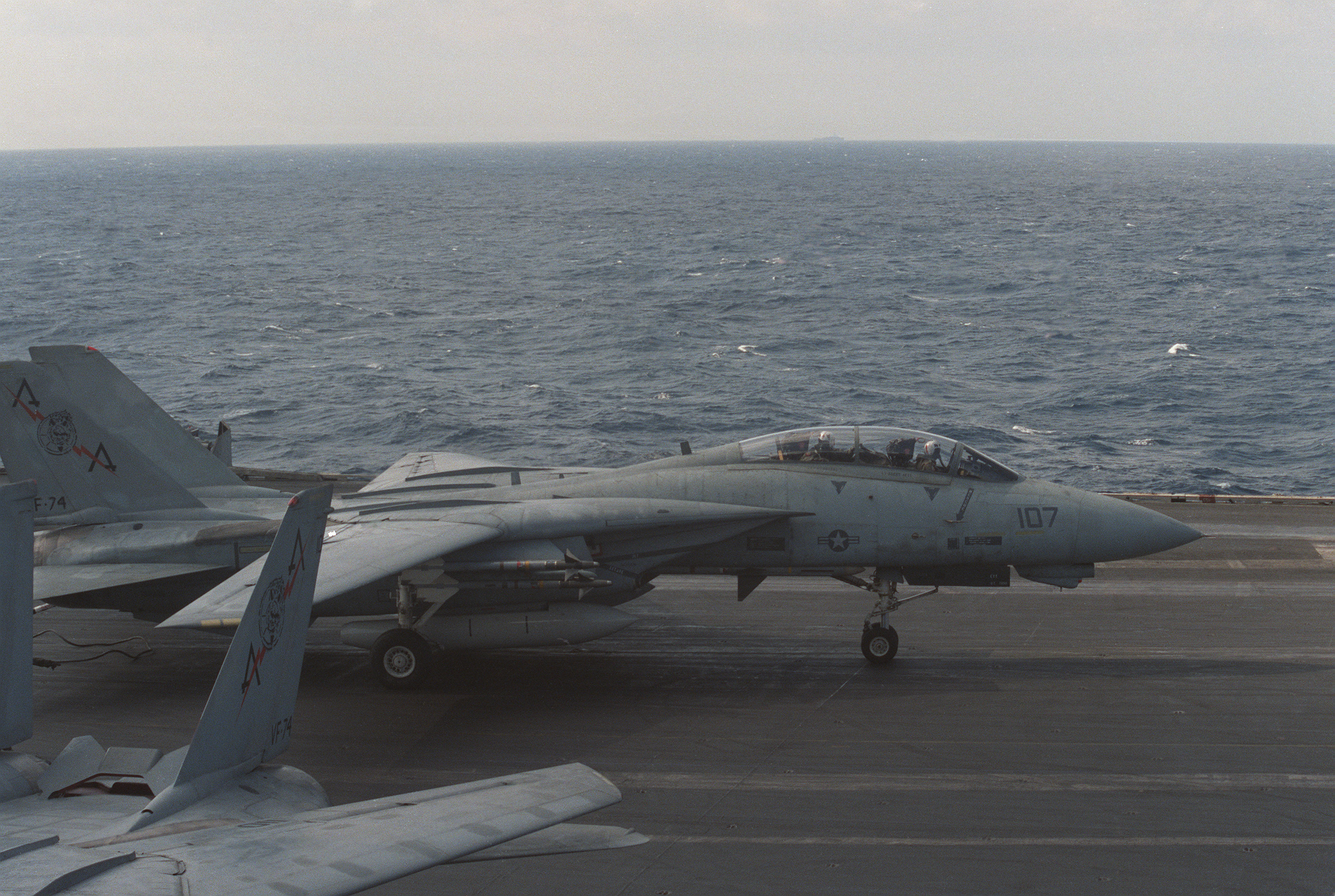
A F-14 from VF-74 lands on USS Saratoga

Several Libyan patrol boats headed out towards the U.S. battle group, and the Americans responded by sending up aircraft to counter them. When one of the patrol boats locked on to American aircraft with its fire-control radar, USS Richmond K. Turner, a Leahy-class destroyer leader who had been serving as anti-aircraft radar picket ship defending the carrier group's right flank responded by firing an RGM-84 Harpoon missile, striking the vessel and setting it ablaze. It was towed back to Benghazi.

USS Saratoga launched A-7 Corsair II attack aircraft armed with AGM-88 HARM missiles from Attack Squadron [VA-83], A-6 Intruder aircraft armed with Harpoon missiles and cluster bombs from VA-85 and EA-6Bs from VAQ-137. USS America had A-6Es from VA-34 and EA-6Bs from the U.S. Marine Corps squadron VMAQ-2 and USS Coral Sea had A-6Es from VA-55 and EA-6Bs from VAQ-135 in the air.

These were supported by several E-2Cs, F-14As, F/A-18 Hornets and KA-6D aerial refueling aircraft. The first air strikes occurred around 19:26 (CET) when two A-6E TRAM Intruders from VA-34 found the French-built Beir Grassa-class patrol boat Waheed. Waheed was first disabled by a Harpoon missile fired by one of the A-6 Intruders from VA-34 and then destroyed by Intruders from VA-85 using Rockeye cluster bombs.

Forty minutes later, F-14As, F/A-18As, A-7Es and EA-6Bs headed towards the SA-5 site near Surt at low level and suddenly climbed, which caused the Libyans to activate their radars and launch missiles at the incoming aircraft. This prompted the A-7Es to launch several HARM missiles. The strike formation then descended to 98 feet (30 m) above sea level and turned back. According to declassified Soviet documents and memoirs published in 2001 one of the missiles damaged a Square Pair (5N62) radar.

A-6Es from VA-85 and VA-55 turned to engage several Libyan missile boats. At around 21:55 (CET), two A-6Es from VA-55 attacked the Nanuchka-class corvette Ain Zaquit which was heading towards USS Yorktown, prompting Yorktown to vector the Intruders to deploy Harpoon missiles, one of which hit Ain Zaquit causing heavy damage. At the same time, Yorktown fired two Harpoon missiles at another La Combattante IIa-class boat, disabling it.

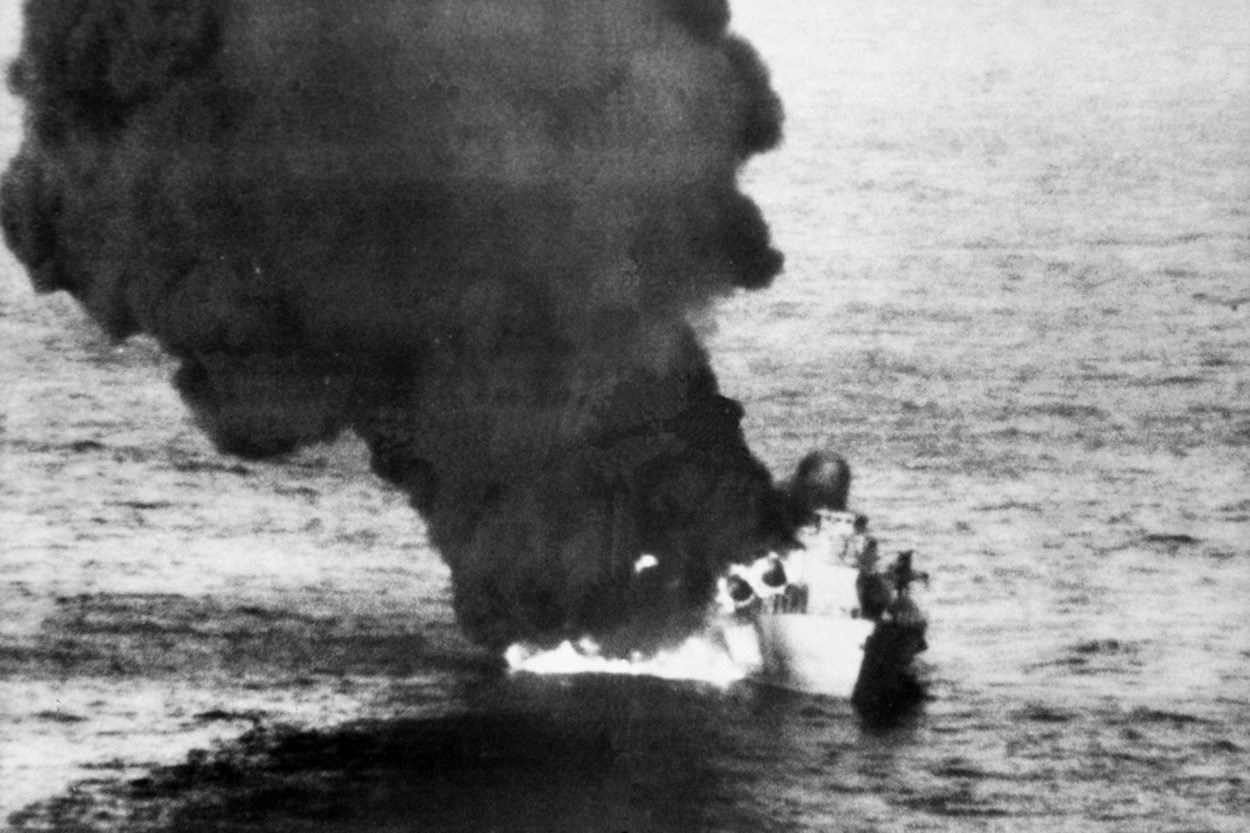
A Libyan corvette burns after attempting to engage US forces

At approximately midnight (CET), the Libyans launched several SA-2 Guidelines and SA-5s, this time at the American A-6Es and A-7Es, which responded by heading towards the coast. A-7Es from VA-83 launched HARM missiles, disabling several Libyan radars. Three more SA-5s were launched from Syrte with a single SA-2 launched near Benghazi. At 07:30 (CET) another Libyan Nanuchka-class corvette was intercepted by A-6Es from VA-55 and was disabled by Rockeye munitions. The corvette was later sunk by a Harpoon missile launched from a VA-85 A-6E.

The operation was terminated after this strike with no losses to the Americans. 35 sailors were killed and there were unknown material losses to the Libyans.

== See also ==
- 1986 United States bombing of Libya
