= USS Antrim (FFG-20) =

1979 Oliver Hazard Perry-class frigate

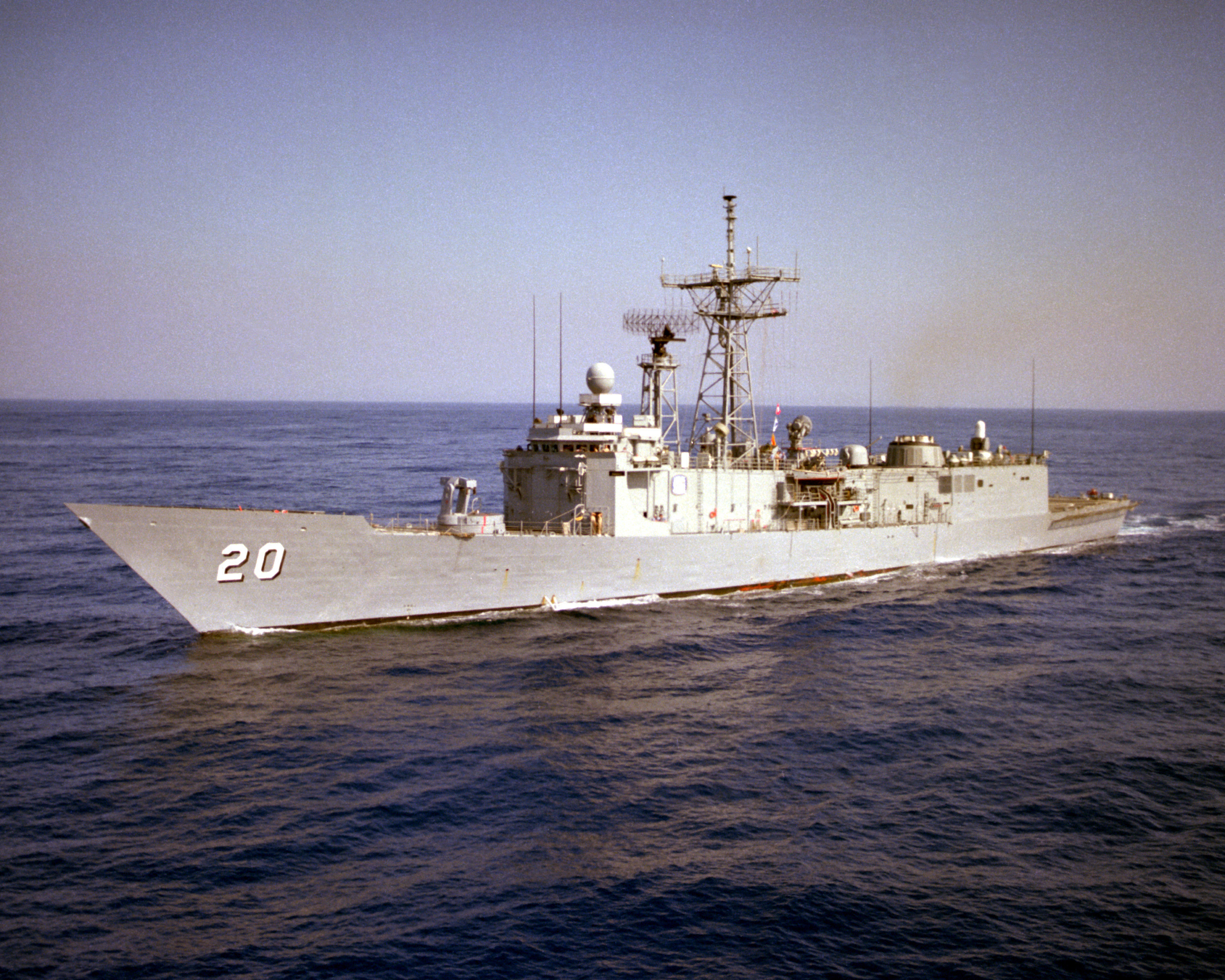
- USS Antrim, in May 1983

History

United States
- Name: Antrim
- Namesake: Rear Admiral Richard Nott Antrim
- Ordered: 28 February 1977
- Builder: Todd Pacific Shipyards, Seattle, WA
- Laid down: 21 June 1978
- Launched: 27 March 1979
- Sponsored by: Mrs. Richard N. Antrim (widow of Rear Admiral Antrim)
- Acquired: 20 August 1981
- Commissioned: 26 September 1981
- Decommissioned: 8 May 1996
- Stricken: 4 September 1997
- Identification: Hull symbol: FFG-20; Call sign: NRNA
- Motto: "In Defense of Freedom"
- Fate: Transferred to Turkey, 27 August 1997
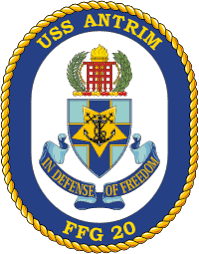
- Badge

Turkey
- Name: Giresun
- Namesake: City of Giresun
- Acquired: 27 August 1997
- Identification: Hull number: F 491; MMSI number: 277478700; Callsign: TBOF
- Status: In active service

General characteristics
- Class & type: Oliver Hazard Perry-class frigate
- Displacement: 4,100 long tons (4,200 t), full load
- Length: 445 feet (136 m), overall
- Beam: 45 feet (14 m)
- Draft: 22 feet (6.7 m)
- Propulsion: 2 × General Electric LM2500-30 gas turbines generating 41,000 shp (31 MW) through a single shaft and variable pitch propeller; 2 × Auxiliary Propulsion Units, 350 hp (260 kW) retractable electric azimuth thrusters for maneuvering and docking.
- Speed: over 29 knots (54 km/h)
- Range: 5,000 nautical miles at 18 knots (9,300 km at 33 km/h)
- Complement: 15 officers and 190 enlisted, plus SH-60 LAMPS detachment of roughly six officer pilots and 15 enlisted maintainers
- Sensors & processing systems: AN/SPS-49 air-search radar; AN/SPS-55 surface-search radar; CAS and STIR fire-control radar; AN/SQS-56 sonar.
- Electronic warfare & decoys: AN/SLQ-32
- Armament: As built: 1 × OTO Melara Mk 75 76 mm/62 caliber naval gun; 2 × Mk 32 triple-tube (324 mm) launchers for Mark 46 torpedoes; 1 × Vulcan Phalanx CIWS; 4 × .50-cal (12.7 mm) machine guns.; 1 × Mk 13 Mod 4 single-arm launcher for Harpoon anti-ship missiles and SM-1MR Standard anti-ship/air missiles (40 round magazine); Note: As of 2004, Mk 13 systems removed from all active US vessels of this class.; G-Class Frigate: 1 × Mk 15 Phalanx CIWS; 1 × Oto Melara 76mm DP gun; 8 × Harpoon SSM; 40 × SM-1 MR SAM; 32 × ESSM launched from Mk-41 VLS (4 ESSM missiles per MK-41 cell through the use of MK25 Quadpack canisters, total of 8 cells); Two triple Mark 32 Anti-submarine warfare torpedo tubes with Mark 46 or Mark 50 anti-submarine warfare torpedoes
- Aircraft carried: 1 × SH-2F LAMPS I

USS Antrim (FFG-20) was the twelfth ship of the Oliver Hazard Perry class of guided-missile frigates. She was named for Rear Admiral Richard Nott Antrim (1907–1969).

== Construction ==
Ordered from Todd Pacific Shipyards, Seattle, Washington, on 28 February 1977, as part of the FY77 program, Antrim was laid down on 21 June 1978, launched on 27 March 1979, and commissioned on 26 September 1981.

== Service history ==
On 1 October, Antrim departed Seattle, en route to Mayport, Florida, her home port. She made stops at Mazatlan and Manzanillo, before arriving in the Canal Zone on 25 October. The guided-missile frigate transited the Panama Canal, on Navy Day, 27 October 1981, and continued on to Mayport, where she arrived on 2 November. Antrim conducted independent ship's exercises out of Mayport, on an intermittent daily basis until 20 November, when she set sail for Guantánamo Bay, Cuba. She carried out shakedown training in the West Indies until 12 December. After a port visit to Ft. Lauderdale, Florida, she tested and calibrated her sound equipment in the Bahamas, before returning to Mayport, on 20 December, to commence holiday stand down.

The holiday leave and upkeep period ended on 11 January 1982, with her return to sea to conduct combat systems qualifications and trials. With that event, the guided-missile frigate resumed a normal schedule of operations out of Mayport, in the local operating area, and in the West Indies, as well. On 26 April, Antrim departed Mayport, bound ultimately for Bath, Maine, and post-shakedown availability at the Bath Iron Works. Along the way, she stopped at Yorktown, Virginia, to unload ordnance, and at Portsmouth, New Hampshire, for a port visit. The warship arrived in Bath, on 7 May and commenced a repair period that lasted 16 weeks. She embarked upon the voyage back to Mayport, on 27 August, made a series of stops en route, and entered Mayport, on 11 September. Antrim stayed in port for almost a month, putting to sea again on 8 October, to carry out post-repair refresher training in the vicinity of Guantanamo Bay. The guided-missile frigate completed that mission at the beginning of November, made a brief call at Key West, Florida, and then executed advanced ASW drills in the Bahamas. She reentered Mayport, on 12 November, and remained there through the end of the year.

Antrim ended holiday stand down early in January 1983, returning to sea to begin training on 4 January. At the beginning of February, she sailed north to Norfolk, Virginia, where she conducted weapons testing and training. On 10 February, while she was engaged in those evolutions, a target drone skipped off the surface and struck Antrim causing a fire in the wardroom and in her electronics spaces. The accident killed a civilian instructor embarked in the warship. Antrim returned to Mayport, and passed the rest of February, engaged in repairs. The warship completed her weapons training and testing during March, and spent most of April, preparing to deploy to the Mediterranean Sea and the Middle East. On 29 April, the guided-missile frigate stood out of Mayport. on her way to the Strait of Gibraltar.

She entered the Mediterranean, on 9 May, and joined the 6th Fleet. Antrim carried out normal 6th Fleet training operations until the second week in June. On 11 June, the warship transited the legendary Bosporus Straits and the Dardanelles and entered the Black Sea. For eight days, she conducted operations in the Black Sea, and during that time, also paid a four-day visit to Constanta, Romania. Antrim left the Black Sea, on 19 June, and resumed her operational schedule as a unit of the 6th Fleet. On 1 August, the guided-missile frigate passed through the Suez Canal and set a course for the Persian Gulf. Following a brief stop at Djibouti, on 3 August, she began duty as a radar picket ship on 4 August. Except for a port call at Karachi, Pakistan, from 27 September to 4 October, Antrim, served in the Persian Gulf for almost three months. She carried out turnover formalities with her relief at Djibouti, on 30 October, transited the Suez Canal, on 4 November, and laid in a course for Rota, Spain. After stopping at Rota, briefly on 10 November, Antrim set out across the Atlantic. She arrived in Mayport, on 21 November, and stood down for the last weeks of the year.

The relative inactivity of the final month of 1983 carried over into and through the first month of 1984. Antrim did not put to sea again until the first week in February. On 3 February, the warship got underway for the coast of Central America. After a call at Puerto Cortés, Honduras, on 6 and 7 February, she transited the Panama Canal, on 10 February. For almost seven weeks, Antrim conducted operations off the western shores of Central America from the base at Rodman, in the Canal Zone. On 28 March, she travelled back through the canal and set her course for Mayport. The guided-missile frigate stood into her home port on 2 April. She passed the bulk of the month engaged in repairs, completing post-repair sea trials on 26 and 27 April. On 28 April, Antrim headed north for port visits at Newport, Rhode Island, and Portsmouth, followed by plane guard duty for Dwight D. Eisenhower.

The warship returned to Mayport, on 11 May, and resumed local operations 10 days later. At the end of June, she headed for Guantanamo Bay, where she carried out refresher training until the end of July. After visiting Charleston, South Carolina, at the end of the first week in August, Antrim arrived back in Mayport, on 11 August. On 20 August, the guided-missile frigate began a two-month restricted availability at Mayport. She wrapped up the repair period with sea trials on 22 and 23 October, and a stop at Charleston, on 24 October, to load ordnance material. Back in Mayport, on 26 October, Antrim executed training missions in the local operating area until early in December, when she began preparations for overseas movement.

Holiday routine interrupted those preparations, late in December, but the pace quickened in January 1985, as her February departure date drew near. On 4 February, Antrim stood out of Mayport, on her way across the Atlantic. She made a short call at Rota, for fuel on St. Valentine's Day before passing through the Strait of Gibraltar, and into the Mediterranean Sea. The warship transited of the Mediterranean, stopping only at Palma de Mallorca and Augusta Bay, Sicily, before negotiating the Suez Canal, on 27 February. Steaming then through the Red Sea and around the Arabian Peninsula, Antrim passed through the Strait of Hormuz on 9 March, and entered the Persian Gulf. While cruising on radar picket station in the Persian Gulf, Antrim received a distress call from the Liberian-flag motor vessel, MV Caribbean Breeze, that had suffered an Iranian missile attack to her bridge. The guided-missile frigate and her embarked helicopter detachment, HSL-36, Del. 1, rendered assistance to the stricken vessel. Antrim, then continued her surveillance patrols of the troubled waters of the Persian Gulf, until the end of the third week in April.

At that time, she departed the gulf for a little more than a week to make a port call at Karachi, Pakistan. Back on station in the Persian Gulf, at the end of April, Antrim responded to another call for help on 2 May, after the Iranians attacked another motor vessel, MV Nordic Trader, with missiles. Again, the warship and her helicopter detachment evacuated casualties. Her remaining two months of surveillance patrols in the Persian Gulf provided no further untoward incidents. She turned her responsibilities over to Klakring and Reid, on 5 July, and set a course via Djibouti, and the Red Sea, to the Suez Canal. Through the canal on 14 July, she made a single stop, at Valencia, Spain, on her voyage across the Mediterranean.

After a short pause at Rota, on 24 July, for fuel, the warship embarked upon the Atlantic passage that same day. On 5 August, one month to the day after her relief, Antrim pulled into Mayport. Post-deployment stand down occupied the remainder of August, but she resumed local operations out of Mayport, early in September. During the latter half of November, the warship voyaged to the coast of Colombia, to assist in a multinational operation against drug smugglers. She returned to Mayport, at the beginning of December, and following a short period of local operations, settled into holiday routine. As of the beginning of 1987, Antrim was at Mayport.

On 30 January 1987, Antrim was assigned to the Naval Reserve Force, Atlantic, at Mayport.

Decommissioned on 8 May 1996, she was transferred to Turkey, on 27 August 1997. She was stricken from the U.S. Naval Vessel Register on 4 September 1997.

== TCG Giresun (F 491) ==
The ship serves in the Turkish Navy as TCG Giresun (F 491).

On 16 March 2009, Giresun, along with HDMS Absalon, successfully prevented a pirate attack on the Vietnamese cargo ship MV Diamond Falcon from succeeding in capturing the target ship.

On 6 March 2011, she aided the destroyer Bulkeley in the capture of four pirates who had attacked the oil tanker MV Guanabara. Three of the pirates were later flown to Tokyo for trial.

== Bibliography ==
- "Antrim (FFG-20) ii". Naval History and Heritage Command. 18 June 2015. This article incorporates text from this source, which is in the public domain.
- "USS Antrim (FFG-20)". NavSource. 9 January 2018.
- Vn, Vietbao (16 March 2009). "Đan Mạch, Thổ Nhĩ Kỳ cùng giải cứu tàu hàng Việt Nam". Viet bao.com (in Vietnamese). Archived from the original on 11 April 2015.
- "Vietnamese Cargo Ship Rescued From Pirates – Turkish Army". Morningstar, Inc. 16 March 2009.
