= USS Turner (DD-259) =

Clemson-class destroyer

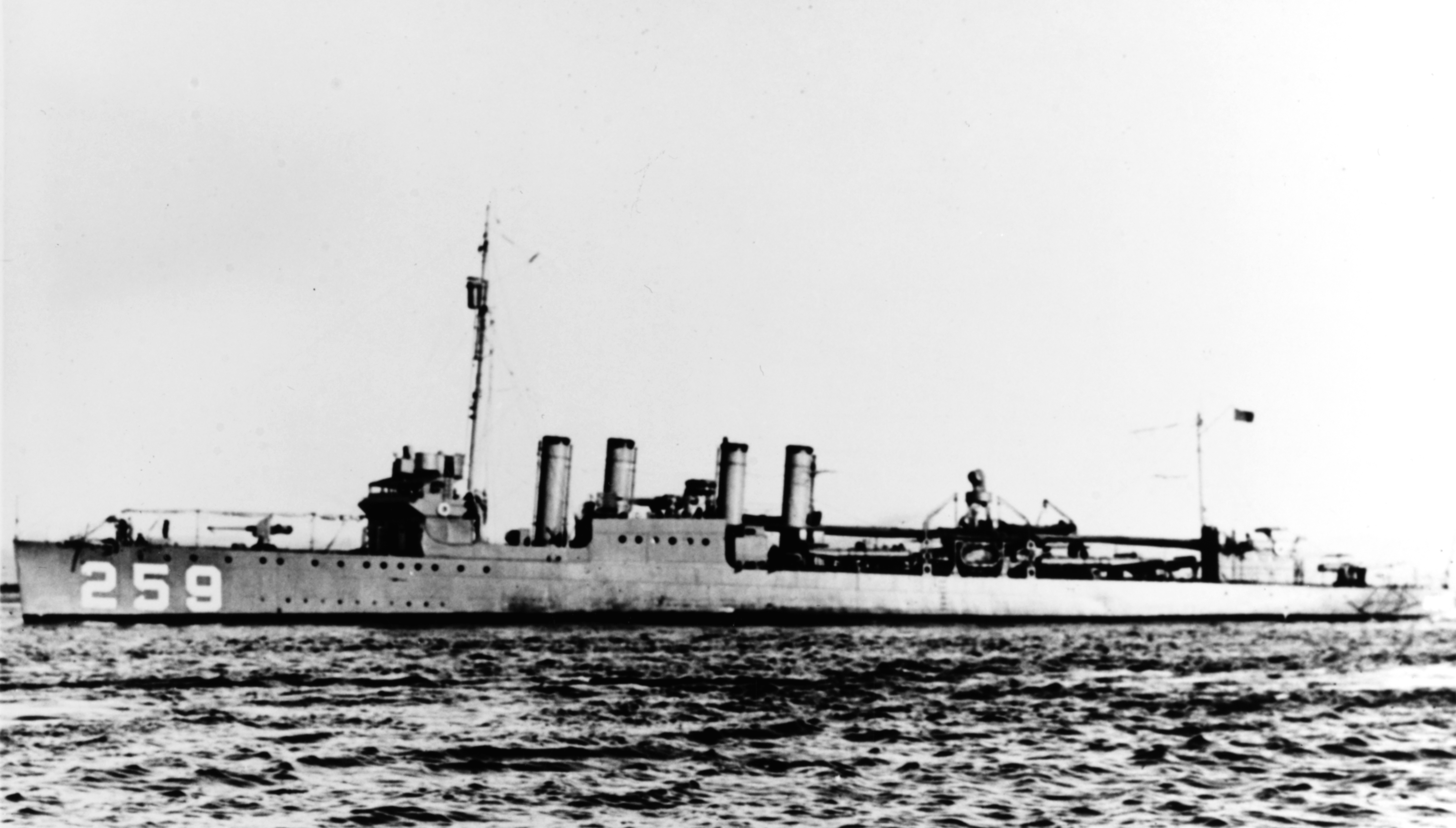
- USS Turner (DD-259), 1919-1921

History

United States
- Name: USS Turner
- Namesake: Daniel Turner
- Builder: Bethlehem Shipbuilding Corporation, Fore River Shipyard, Quincy, Massachusetts
- Laid down: 19 December 1918
- Launched: 17 May 1919
- Commissioned: 24 September 1919
- Decommissioned: 7 June 1922

United States
- Name: YW-56
- In service: October 1936
- Out of service: 13 February 1943

United States
- Name: USS Moosehead
- Namesake: Moosehead Lake region of Maine
- Commissioned: 5 April 1943
- Decommissioned: 19 March 1946
- Stricken: 17 April 1946
- Fate: Sold for scrapping 20 February 1947

General characteristics
- Class & type: Clemson-class destroyer
- Displacement: 1,868 tons
- Length: 314 ft 4 in (95.81 m)
- Beam: 31 ft 8 in (9.65 m)
- Draft: 11 ft 2 in (3.40 m)
- Propulsion: 26,500 shp (19,800 kW); Geared turbines; 2 screws
- Speed: 22 knots (41 km/h; 25 mph)
- Range: 4,900 nmi (9,100 km; 5,600 mi) at 15 knots (28 km/h; 17 mph)
- Complement: 197 officers and enlisted
- Armament: 2 x 3 in (76 mm) guns; 4 x 20 mm guns.; 4 dcp., 2 rkt.

The first USS Turner (DD-259) was a Clemson-class destroyer in commission in the United States Navy from 1919 to 1922. She served in a non-commissioned status as the water lighter YW-56 from 1936 to 1943, and was in commission as a miscellaneous auxiliary, the second USS Moosehead (IX-98), from 1943 to 1946.

== As Turner ==
Named for Daniel Turner, the destroyer was laid down by Bethlehem Shipbuilding Corporation's Fore River Shipyard in Quincy, Massachusetts on 19 December 1918. Turner was launched on 17 May 1919, sponsored by Mrs. Leigh C. Palmer. The ship was commissioned at Boston on 24 September 1919.

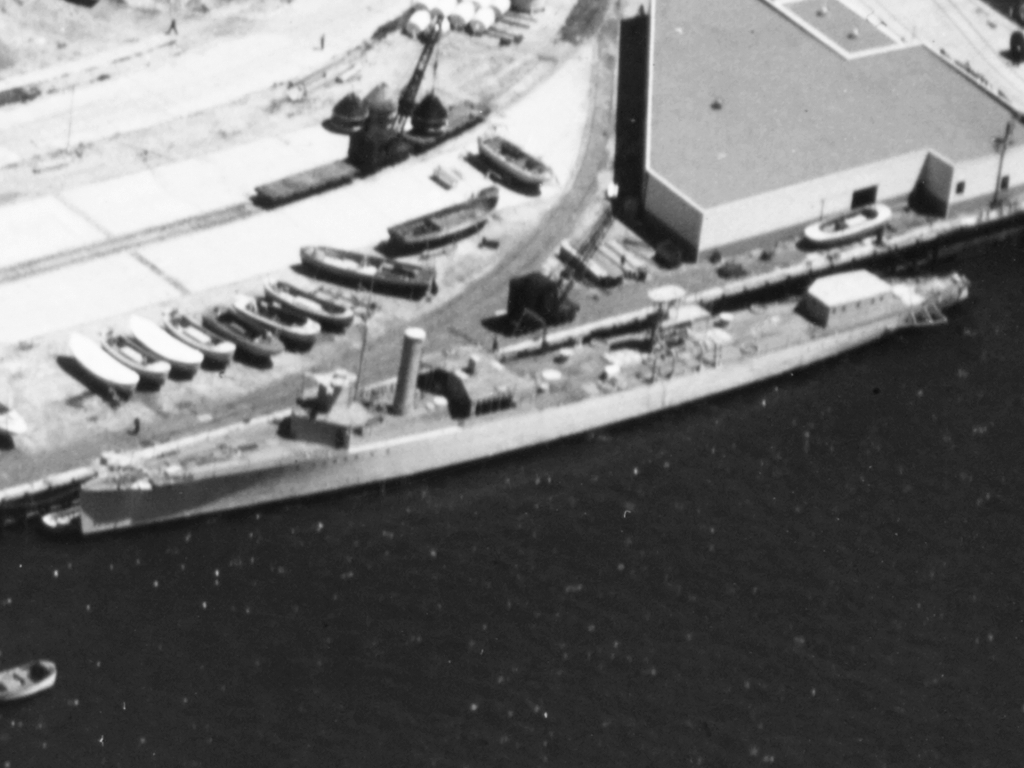
Turner as water barge YW-56 at San Diego, in April 1941.

After duty along the east and west coasts, Turner decommissioned at San Diego, California on 7 June 1922, and she was placed in reserve. Her name was struck from the Navy list on 5 August 1936.

== Conversion to YW-56 ==
On 28 September 1936 the four-stack destroyer was authorized for conversion to a self-propelled water barge. Converted at San Diego in October, she was re-classified to YW-56 and began operations in the San Diego area. The water lighter was assigned to the 11th Naval District 17 October 1940, and in May 1942 she was given additional duty as a ferry between San Diego and San Clemente Island.

== As Moosehead ==
YW-56 was renamed Moosehead, the second U.S. Navy ship of that name, and reclassified IX-98 on 13 February 1943. Following installation of sonar and radar equipment, she commissioned at San Diego on 5 April 1943. She reported for duty with the Operational Training Command, Pacific Fleet, 11 April, and on 23 April she became the flagship of Rear Admiral Frank A. Braisted, COTCPac. During the remaining years of World War II Moosehead operated out of San Diego.

Between May 1943 and December 1944 Moosehead made an average of 11 round trips a month to San Clemente Island carrying passengers, mail, and cargo for the 11th Naval District. From August 1944 until early in 1945 she towed targets for battleships, cruisers, and destroyers and served as a torpedo target for destroyers and torpedo planes. In addition Moosehead screened battleships and cruisers during training exercises.

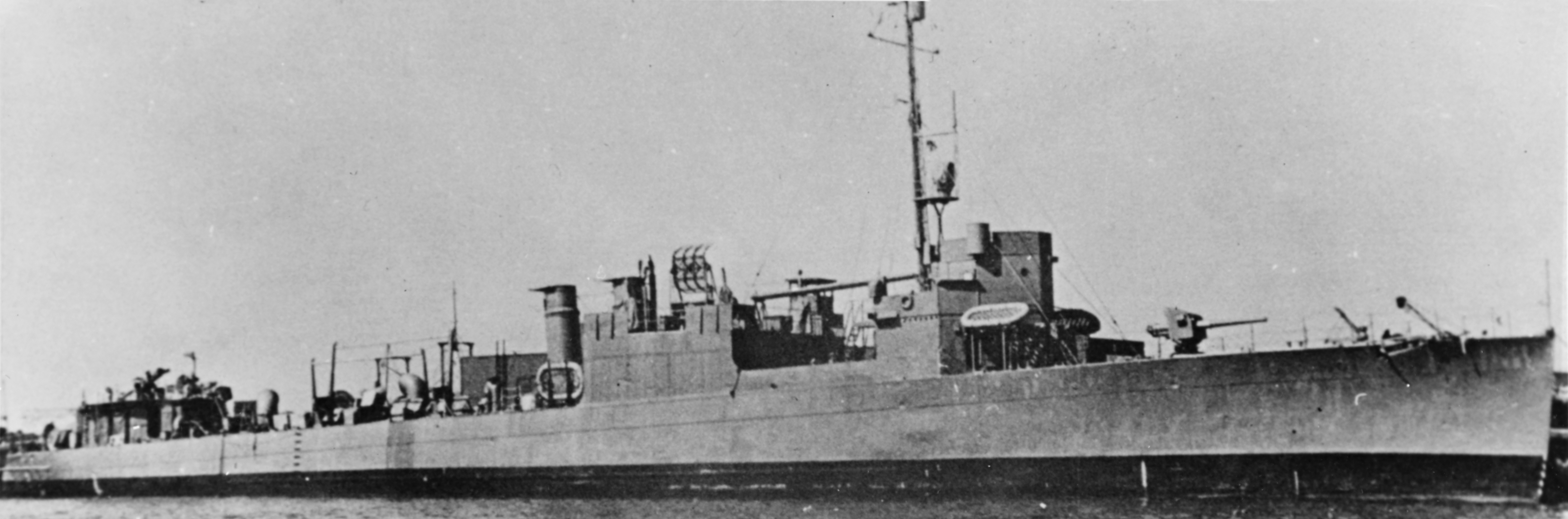
Turner as USS Moosehead (IX-98) in April 1943.

Moosehead carried out her most important service as an at-sea platform for training officers and men of Combat Information Center crews. She carried the latest radar and sonar equipment as well as a CIC classroom and berthing facilities. In July 1943 she began training CIC crews of escort carriers. During the next two and a half years she trained CIC teams for all escort carriers of the Casablanca and Commencement Bay classes. Early in 1944 she broadened the scope of her training to include CIC teams from APAs, AKAs, DEs, ADs, and PCEs. In addition, she served as a test and evaluation ship for experimental rockets, radar equipment, and radio jamming devices.

Although Moosehead operated along the coast of southern California during her entire career under that name, she steamed more than 100,000 miles (160,000 km) and trained more than 4,200 officers and men. Following the end of World War II, she continued training duty as flagship for commander, Training Command, West Coast. On 24 December 1945 she reported to the 11th Naval District for disposal.

She decommissioned at San Diego 19 March 1946, and her name was struck from the Navy list 17 April. She was released to the Maritime Commission 20 February 1947 and sold the same day to Hugo Neu for scrapping.
