= MV Guanabara =

Oil tanker that was attacked by Somali pirate on 5 March 2011

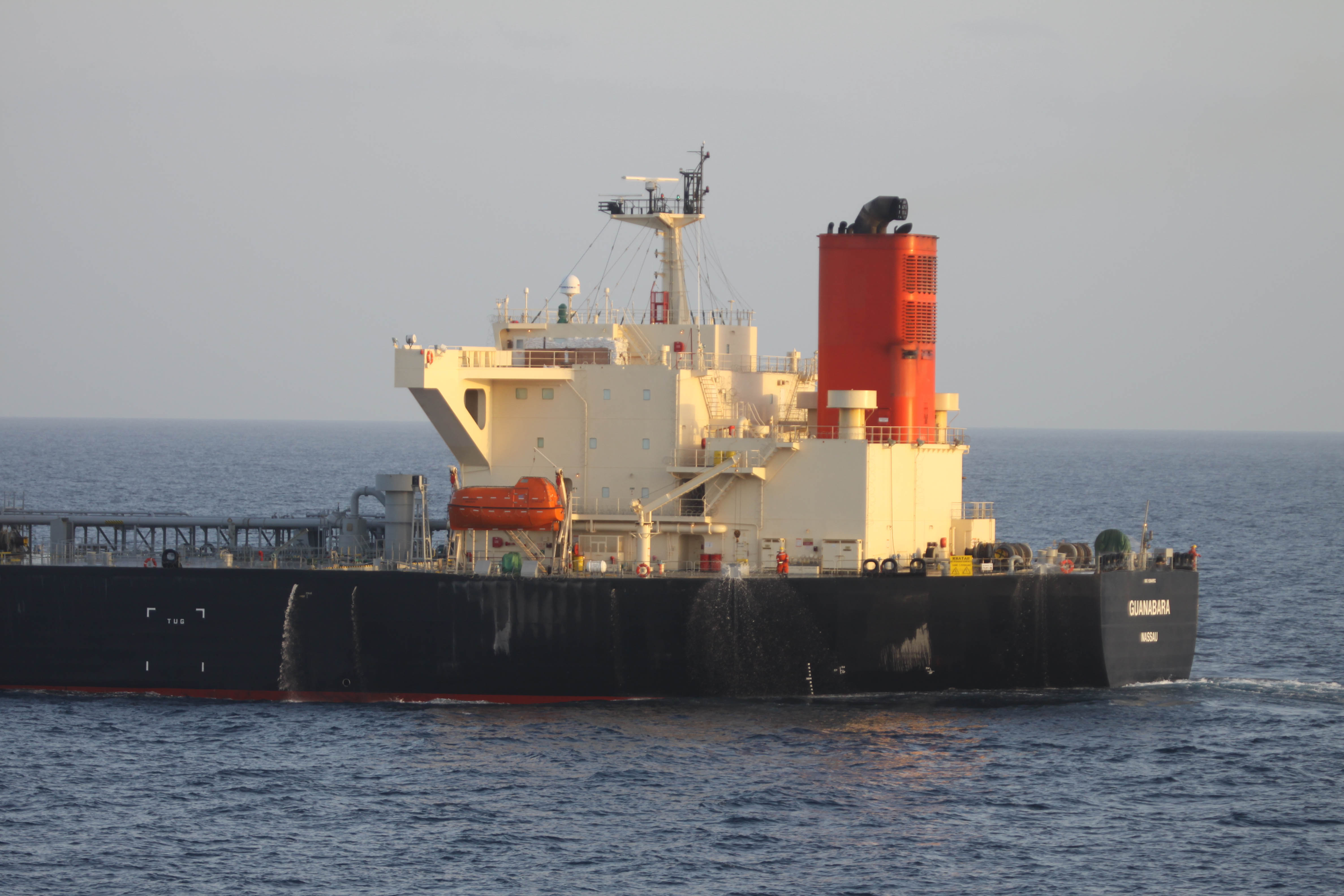
- Guanabara in the Arabian Sea on 6 March 2011

History
- Name: Guanabara
- Port of registry: Bahamas
- Builder: Tsuneishi Corp., Tadotsu
- Launched: 28 August 2007
- Identification: IMO number: 9384992

General characteristics
- Class & type: Crude oil tanker
- Tonnage: 57,462 GT; 106,045 DWT
- Length: 230.0 m (754 ft 7 in)
- Beam: 42.0 m (137 ft 10 in)
- Draught: 10.3 m (33 ft 10 in)
- Speed: 5.6 knots (10.4 km/h; 6.4 mph)
- Crew: 24

MV Guanabara is an oil tanker which was attacked by four pirates on 5 March 2011.

The tanker was attacked by four armed Somali pirates at 3pm on 5 March 2011. The crew of 24 hid in a safe room, and summoned help from USS Bulkeley and the Turkish TCG Giresun. The pirates were captured without a fight. Three of the pirates were indicted in Japan. The fourth was turned over to juvenile authorities, as it was determined that he was a minor.
