= Daniel Turner (naval officer) =

Naval officer

Daniel Turner (1794? probably Richmond, New York – 4 February 1850) was an officer in the United States Navy.

== Naval career ==
Turner was appointed a midshipman in the Navy on 1 January 1808. Following brief duty at the New York Naval Station, he served in Constitution on the North Atlantic Station. On 8 June 1812, he received orders to Norwich, Connecticut, where he took command of the gunboats located there.

On 14 March 1813, two days after receiving his commission as a lieutenant, Turner was sent to Sackett's Harbor, New York, located on the shores of Lake Erie. There, he took command of Niagara, a brig in Oliver Hazard Perry's squadron. However, just before the Battle of Lake Erie, he relinquished command to Captain Jesse D. Elliott and assumed command of Caledonia. The little brig played an important role in the battle on 10 September 1813 because, at one point in the action, her two 24-pounder long guns were the only ones in Perry's flotilla capable of returning the distant fire of the three heaviest Royal Navy ships then in the process of pounding Perry's flagship Lawrence. For his part in the American victory at Lake Erie, Lt. Turner received the praise of Perry, a vote of thanks and a medal from Congress, and a sword from the state of New York.

In the summer of 1814, Turner succeeded to the command of schooner Scorpion, and he cruised Lakes Erie and Huron in her supporting army operations around Detroit and blockading British forces at the Nottawasaga River and Lake Simcoe. In July 1814, Commodore Arthur Sinclair conducted a hit-and-run raid at St. Mary River, Upper Canada capturing a small merchantman, the Mink. After capturing the merchantman in the raid, Sinclair withdrew back to American lines in Michilimackinac. In extension of his raid at St. Mary River. Sinclair sent Turner with a detachment of seamen alongside regulars under Andrew Holmes to penetrate deeper into enemy territory. Turner destroyed buildings, possessions, and burned a schooner. Daniel Turner withdrew back to American territory in Michilimackinac reuniting with Sinclair. On 6 September 1814, Turner and his command were captured by the British when he brought Scorpion alongside the former American schooner Tigress which, unbeknownst to him, had been captured a few days earlier. After a period of imprisonment at Fort Mackinac, Lt. Turner returned to the United States in exchange for a British prisoner of war.

Between 1815 and 1817, Turner cruised the Mediterranean in the frigate Java commanded by his old superior on the Great Lakes, Oliver Hazard Perry. During that deployment, Java visited Algiers and Tripoli in a show of American naval strength calculated to impress the Barbary pirates and intimidate them into honoring their treaties with the United States. In 1817, Java returned to Newport, Rhode Island, to be laid up.

Between 1819 and 1824, Turner returned to sea in the schooner Nonsuch attached to a squadron commanded again by Oliver Hazard Perry. In addition to hunting West Indian pirates, his ship sailed up the Orinoco River to carry Perry on a diplomatic mission to the Venezuelan government under Simon Bolivar. During the return downriver, Perry and many of the crew contracted yellow fever. Turner was close at hand when his mentor died at Trinidad on 23 August 1819. During the remaining years of Turner's assignment to Nonsuch, his ship worked along the east coast of the United States, patrolled in the West Indies to suppress piracy, and made a brief cruise to the Mediterranean in 1824.

Following shore duty at Boston, Massachusetts, Turner returned to sea in 1827 for a three-year assignment with the West India Squadron, as the commanding officer of Erie. In 1830, he came ashore again for three years at the Portsmouth Navy Yard.

Promoted to captain on 3 March 1835, Turner spent a long period waiting orders before returning to sea in 1839 in command of USS Constitution. He sailed the Pacific Squadron in "Old Ironsides," until he was relieved in 1841. From 1843 to 1846, he commanded the American squadron which operated along the Brazilian coast. From that duty, he reported ashore again as Commandant, Portsmouth Navy Yard.

Capt. Turner died suddenly on 4 February 1850 at Philadelphia, Pennsylvania and he was buried in Greenmount Cemetery in Baltimore, Maryland.

== Legacy ==
Three United States Navy destroyers have been named USS Turner in honor of Captain Turner, including USS Turner (DD-648) which was sunk due to a series of shattering internal explosions.

There is a portrait of Captain Turner in the collection of the Redwood Library in Newport, Rhode Island.
