= USS Bulkeley =

Arleigh Burke-class destroyer

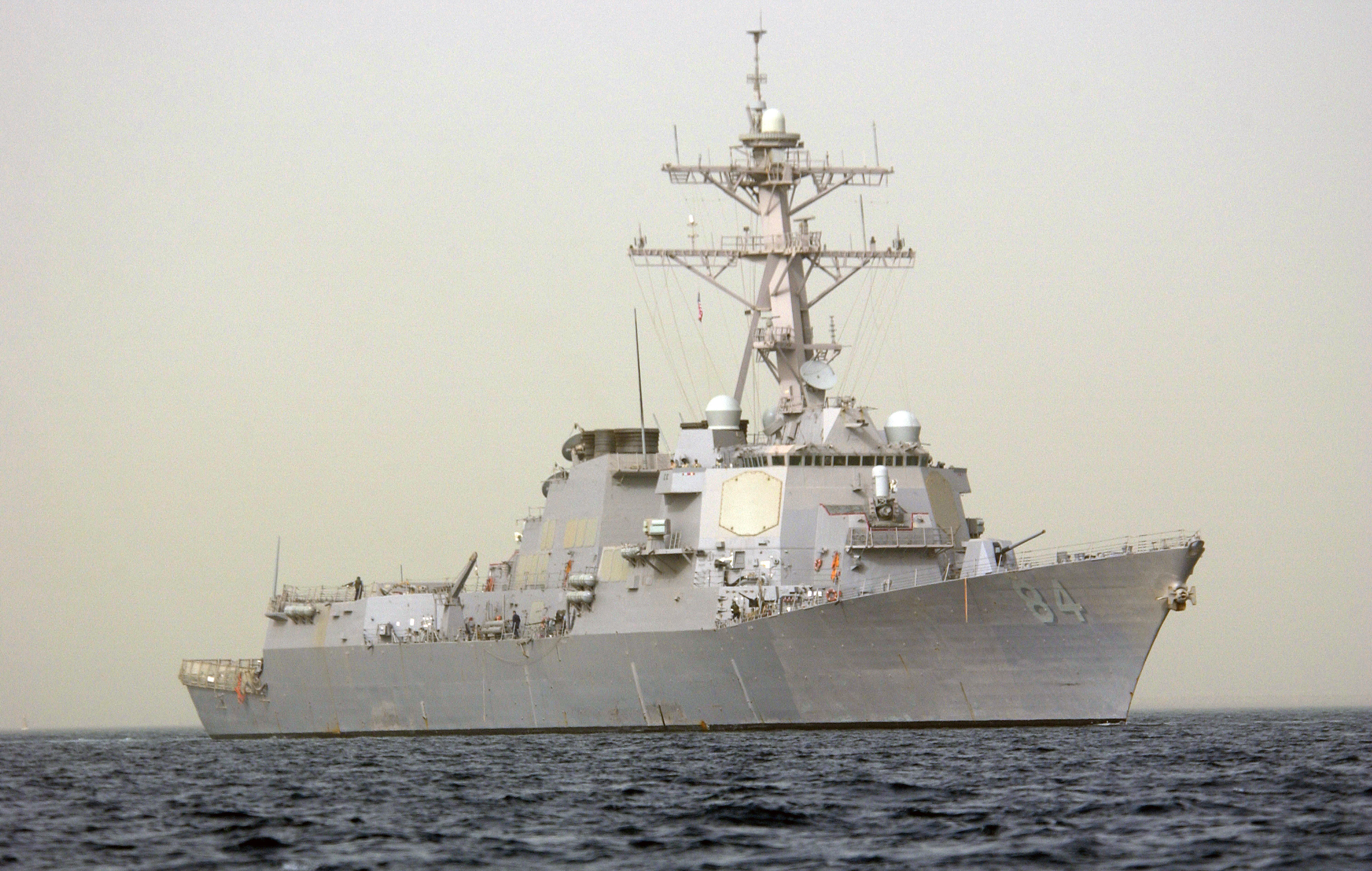
- USS Bulkeley on 15 June 2004

History

United States
- Name: Bulkeley
- Namesake: John D. Bulkeley
- Ordered: 20 June 1996
- Builder: Ingalls Shipbuilding
- Laid down: 10 May 1999
- Launched: 21 June 2000
- Commissioned: 8 December 2001
- Home port: Rota
- Identification: MMSI number: 303870000; Callsign: NJBD; Hull number: DDG-84
- Motto: Freedom's Torch
- Status: in active service
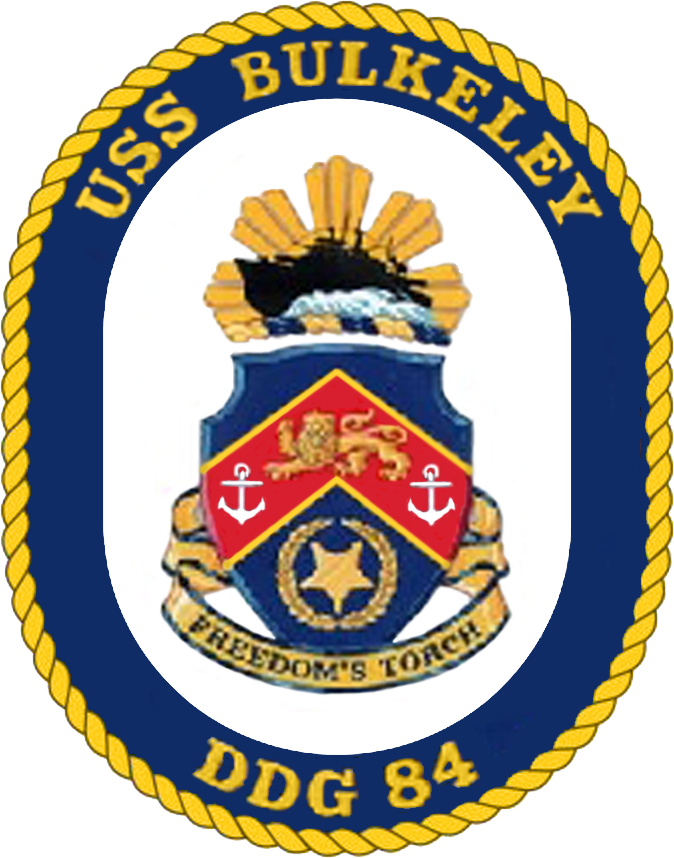
- Badge

General characteristics
- Class & type: Arleigh Burke-class destroyer
- Displacement: 9,200 tons
- Length: 509 ft 6 in (155.30 m)
- Beam: 59 ft (18 m)
- Draft: 31 ft (9.4 m)
- Propulsion: 2 × shafts
- Speed: In excess of 30 kn (56 km/h; 35 mph)
- Range: 4,400 nmi (8,100 km; 5,100 mi) at 20 kn (37 km/h; 23 mph)
- Complement: 33 commissioned officers; 38 chief petty officers; 210 enlisted personnel
- Sensors & processing systems: AN/SPY-1D PESA 3D radar (Flight I, II, IIA); AN/SPY-6(V)1 AESA 3D radar (Flight III); AN/SPS-67(V)3 or (V)5 surface search radar (DDG-51 – DDG-118); AN/SPQ-9B surface search radar (DDG-119 onward); AN/SPS-73(V)12 surface search/navigation radar (DDG-51 – DDG-86); BridgeMaster E surface search/navigation radar (DDG-87 onward); 3 × AN/SPG-62 fire-control radar; Mk 46 optical sight system (Flight I, II, IIA); Mk 20 electro-optical sight system (Flight III); AN/SQQ-89 ASW combat system: AN/SQS-53C sonar array; AN/SQR-19 tactical towed array sonar (Flight I, II, IIA); TB-37U multi-function towed array sonar (DDG-113 onward); AN/SQQ-28 LAMPS III shipboard system
- Electronic warfare & decoys: AN/SLQ-32 electronic warfare suite; AN/SLQ-25 Nixie torpedo countermeasures; Mk 36 Mod 12 decoy launching systems; Mk 53 Nulka decoy launching systems; Mk 59 decoy launching systems
- Armament: Guns: 1 × 5-inch (127 mm)/62 mk 45 mod 4 (lightweight gun); 1 × 20 mm (0.8 in) Phalanx CIWS; 2 × 25 mm (0.98 in) Mk 38 machine gun system; 4 × 0.50 inches (12.7 mm) caliber guns; Missiles: 1 × SeaRAM CIWS; 1 × 32-cell, 1 × 64-cell (96 total cells) Mk 41 vertical launching system (VLS): RIM-66M surface-to-airmissile; RIM-156 surface-to-air missile; RIM-174A standard ERAM; RIM-161 anti-ballistic missile; RIM-162 ESSM (quad-packed); BGM-109 Tomahawk cruise missile; RUM-139 vertical launch ASROC; Torpedoes: 2 × Mark 32 triple torpedo tubes: Mark 46 lightweight torpedo; Mark 50 lightweight torpedo; Mark 54 lightweight torpedo
- Aircraft carried: 2 × MH-60R Seahawk helicopters

USS Bulkeley (DDG-84) is an Arleigh Burke-class (Flight IIA) Aegis guided missile destroyer in the United States Navy. She is named for Medal of Honor recipient Vice Admiral John D. Bulkeley. USS Bulkeley was the 15th ship of this class to be built at Ingalls Shipbuilding in Pascagoula, Mississippi, and construction began on 10 May 1999. She was launched on 21 June 2000 and was christened on 24 June 2000. On 8 December 2001 she was commissioned during a pierside ceremony at the Intrepid Sea, Air and Space Museum in New York City, New York, with Commander Carlos Del Toro in command. Del Toro later became the 78th Secretary of the Navy in 2021.

== Ships History ==
=== 2004 ===
On 13 June 2004, Bulkeley came to the aid of a vessel in distress, Al-Rashid Mum 131. Shortly after turning the vessel over to an Iranian tugboat, it sank. Bulkeley rescued three crew and recovered the body of a fourth. The tug rescued one additional crewman; the other seven were lost at sea. The incident is recounted in the book In the Shadow of Greatness.

=== 2011 ===
In February 2011, Bulkeley was involved in a mission to rescue four American citizens from the yacht Quest which was attacked by Somali pirates.

On 5 March 2011, Bulkeley was involved in rescuing a Japanese oil tanker, MV Guanabara, from Somali pirates while on duty with Combined Task Force 151 off the coast of Oman. Three of the pirates were tried and convicted in Japan, the fourth was turned over to juvenile authorities, as it was determined that he was a minor.

On 16 May 2011, Bulkeley responded to a mayday call from the Panamanian flagged very large crude carrier Artemis Glory by dispatching a Seahawk helicopter (from HSL 48) to its position. Seeing that a piratical skiff carrying four men was firing upon Artemis Glory, the Seahawk investigated the skiff. The pirates opened fire on the helicopter with small arms and were summarily neutralized by crew served weapons from the helicopter in self-defense. The helicopter then withdrew without any casualties to its own crewmembers or that of Artemis Glory.

The ship returned to Norfolk on 15 July 2011. During its deployment, she had participated in operations which had captured 75 Somali pirates and had missile strikes by its carrier strike group against the Libyan government.

=== 2022 ===
On 4 August 2022, Bulkeley departed Norfolk for a homeport shift to Rota, Spain, arriving on 17 August. Her aft Phalanx CIWS was replaced with a SeaRAM CIWS.

On July 16, while operating at a position between Libya and Crete, a helicopter from USS Bulkeley spotted a vessel that appeared to be dead in the water. The destroyer asked a nearby oil tanker, Seaways Sabine, to intervene, after which it retrieved 31 people from the distressed craft. Bulkeley transferred medical corpsmen over to the tanker in a RHIB. The responders were able to stabilize two of the victims; the third died despite their intervention, including an attempt at CPR. The remaining survivors stayed aboard Seaways Sabine as the tanker got back under way. The vessel arrived at an anchorage off Alexandria on the morning of July 18.

=== 2024 ===
On 1 October 2024, Bulkeley was involved in the interception of missiles employing SM-3 and SM-6 missiles during the October 2024 Iranian strikes against Israel.

=== 2026 ===
On 4 March, Bulkeley had fired Tomahawk missiles at Iranian targets in support of Operation Epic Fury.

=== Awards ===
- Navy Unit Commendation – (Nov 2015 – Jul 2016)
- Navy Meritorious Unit Commendation – (Jan 2011 – Nov 2012, Aug 2013 – Mar 2014, Apr–Dec 2018)
- Battle "E" – (2006, 2011, 2018, 2024, 2025)
- Arizona Memorial Trophy – (2005–2006)

== Coat of arms ==
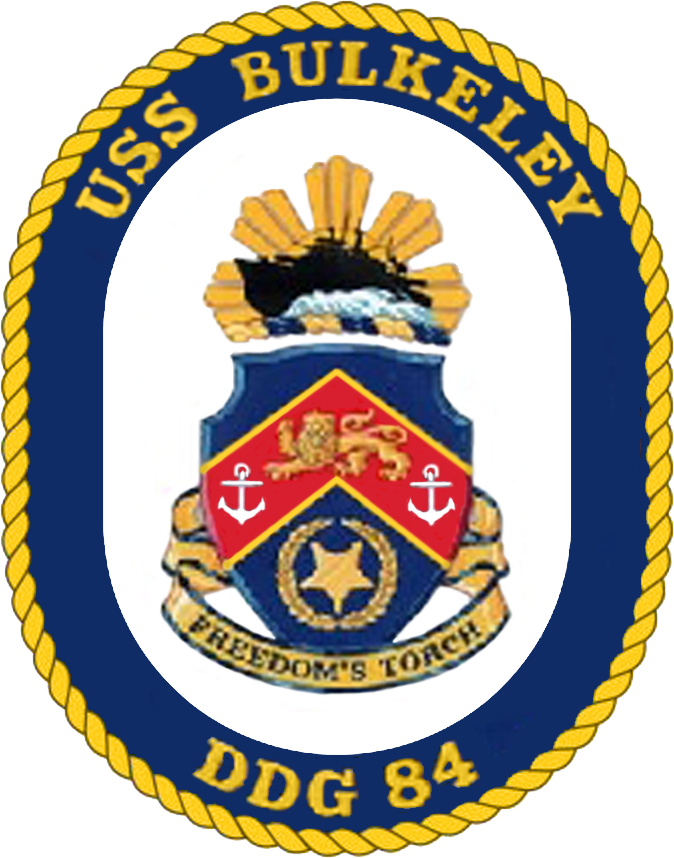

=== Shield ===
The shield has background of blue and a medium blue trim. A red chevron with anchors surround a lion in the center of the shield, with a reversed star below.

The traditional Navy colors were chosen for the shield because dark blue and gold represents the sea and excellence respectively. The inverted star at the shield base refers to the Medal of Honor Admiral Bulkeley received for his forcefulness and daringness during the defense of the Philippines. The hallmarks of USS Bulkeley, honor and high achievement, are represented in the gold wreath. From the family coat of arms, the red chevron represents the valor and sacrifice displayed by Admiral Bulkeley when he led a flotilla of PT boats and minesweepers to Utah Beach before troops stormed the beach at Normandy. The lion indicates the heritage of Normandy and represents courage and strength. Silver anchors surround the lion to display the U.S. Navy sailors' devotion and commitment while defending the countries freedom, keeping USS Bulkeley and the United States Navy "Second to None."

=== Crest ===
The Philippine sun surrounds a Patrol Torpedo boat parting waves of the sea.

A PT boat from World War II is surrounded by the Philippine sun shows honor to Admiral Bulkeley's role in the Pacific. This includes the daring rescue of General MacArthur and Philippine President Quezon from the Battle of Corregidor.

=== Motto ===
The motto is written on a scroll of gold with blue trim.

The ships motto is "Freedom's Torch". The motto is a reference to both the honorable feats of Admiral Bulkeley and the Medal of Honor he received.

=== Seal ===
The coat of arms in full color as in the blazon, upon a white background enclosed within a dark blue oval border edged on the outside with a gold rope and bearing the inscription "USS Bulkeley" at the top and "DDG 84" in the base all gold.
