= USS Montrose =

1944 Haskell-class attack transport

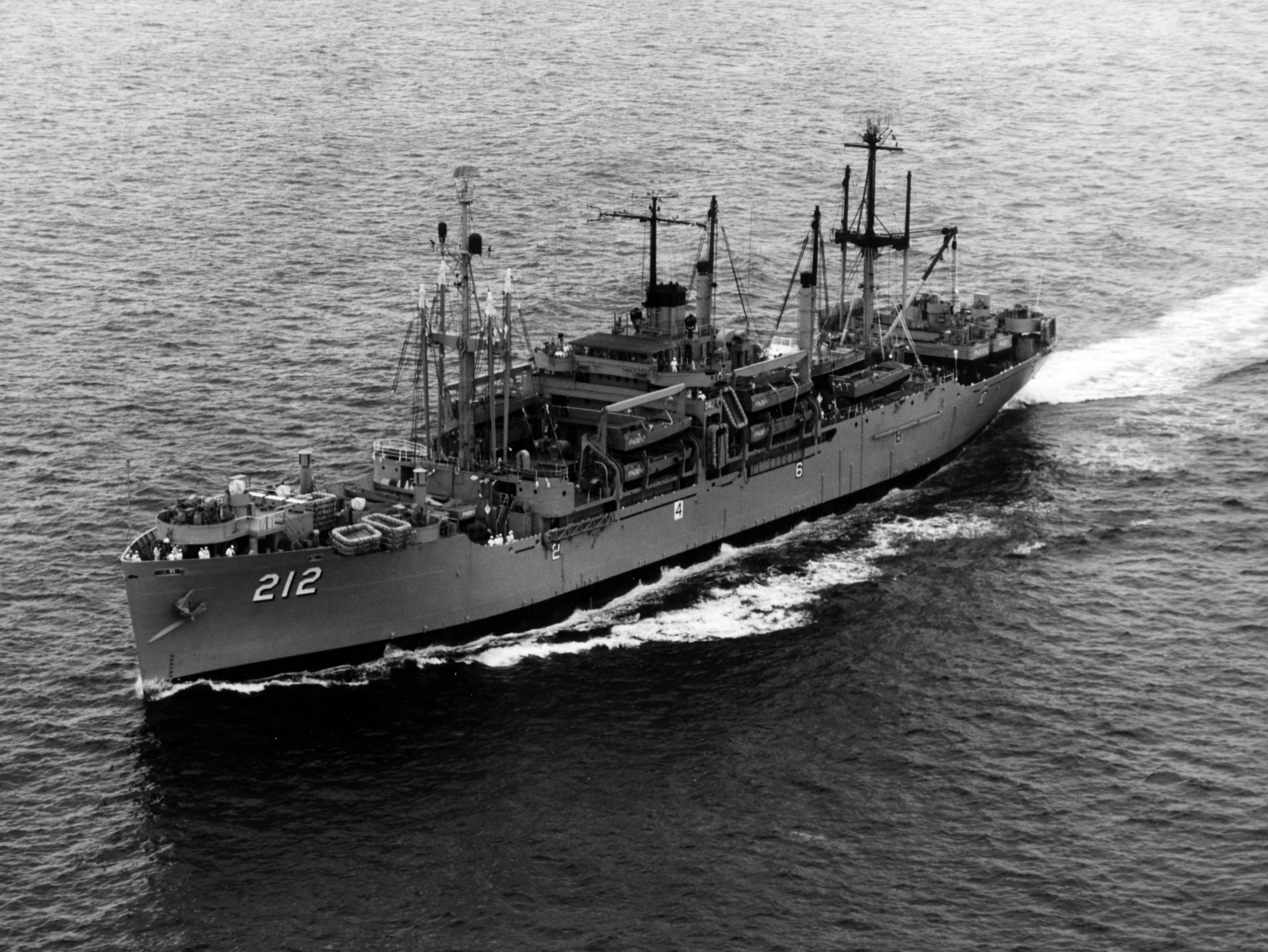

History

United States
- Name: Montrose
- Namesake: Montrose County, Colorado
- Ordered: as a Type VC2-S-AP5 hull, MCE hull 560
- Builder: Permanente Metals Corporation, Richmond, California
- Yard number: 560
- Laid down: 17 June 1944
- Launched: 13 September 1944
- Sponsored by: Mrs Marcia C. Barnhart
- Commissioned: 2 November 1944
- Decommissioned: 26 October 1946
- Identification: Hull symbol: APA-212; Code letters: NPPP
- Honors and awards: 1 × battle star for World War II service
- Fate: laid up in the Pacific Reserve Fleet, Stockton Group, 26 October 1946

United States
- Recommissioned: 12 September 1950
- Decommissioned: 2 November 1969
- Stricken: 2 November 1969
- Identification: Hull symbol: APA-212; Hull symbol: LPA-212
- Honors and awards: 3 × battle stars for Korean War service; 6 × battle stars for Vietnam War service
- Fate: Sold for scrapping, 4 June 1970, withdrawn, 10 June 1970

General characteristics
- Class & type: Haskell-class attack transport
- Type: Type VC2-S-AP5
- Displacement: 6,873 long tons (6,983 t) (light load); 14,837 long tons (15,075 t) (full load)
- Length: 455 ft (139 m)
- Beam: 62 ft (19 m)
- Draft: 24 ft (7.3 m)
- Installed power: 2 × Combustion Engineering header-type boilers, 465 psi (3,210 kPa) 750 °F (399 °C); 8,500 shp (6,338 kW)
- Propulsion: 1 × Westinghouse geared turbine; 1 x propeller
- Speed: 17.7 kn (32.8 km/h; 20.4 mph)
- Boats & landing craft carried: 2 × LCMs; 1 × open LCPL; 18 × LCVPs; 2 × LCPRs; 1 × closed LCPL (Captain's Gig)
- Capacity: 2,900 long tons (2,900 t) DWT; 150,000 cu ft (4,200 m^{3}) (non-refrigerated)
- Troops: 86 officers, 1,475 enlisted
- Complement: 99 officers, 503 enlisted
- Armament: 1 × 5 in (127 mm)/38 caliber dual purpose gun; 1 × quad 40 mm (1.6 in) Bofors anti-aircraft (AA) gun mounts; 4 × twin 40mm Bofors (AA) gun mounts; 10 × single 20 mm (0.8 in) Oerlikon cannons AA mounts

Service record
- Part of: TransRon 17 (WWII)
- Operations: World War II; Assault and occupation of Okinawa Gunto (26 March–26 April 1945); Korean War; First UN Counter Offensive (9–11 February, 12 March–12 April 1951); Communist China Spring Offensive (23–25 April, 13–14 May, 5–6 June 1951); UN Summer–Fall Offensive (12 July 1951); Vietnam War; Vietnam Defense(8–18 November, 20 November–4 December, 10–24 December 1965); Vietnam Counteroffensive (25 December 1965, 28 January–1 March 1966); Vietnam Counteroffensive–Phase II (23 March–28 April, 25–27 May 1967); Vietnam Counteroffensive–Phase III (6–7 June 1967); Vietnam Counteroffensive–Phase V (30 August–1 September 1968); Vietnam Counteroffensive–Phase VI (28 November–11 December 1968, 8–9 January 1969)
- Awards: World War II; Combat Action Ribbon; China Service Medal; American Campaign Medal; Asiatic–Pacific Campaign Medal; World War II Victory Medal; Navy Occupation Service Medal; National Defense Service Medal; Philippine Liberation Medal; Korean War; Korean Service Medal; United Nations Korea Medal; Republic of Korea War Service Medal; Vietnam War; Armed Forces Expeditionary Medal; Vietnam Service Medal; Republic of Vietnam Gallantry Cross Unit Citation; Republic of Vietnam Campaign Medal

USS Montrose (APA/LPA-212) was a Haskell-class attack transport in service with the United States Navy from 1944 to 1946 and from 1950 to 1969. She was scrapped in 1970.

== History ==
Montrose was of the VC2-S-AP5 Victory ship design type and was named for Montrose County, Colorado. She was laid down 17 June 1944, under Maritime Commission (MARCOM) contract, MCV hull 560, by Permanente Metals Corporation, Yard No. 2, Richmond, California; launched 13 September 1944; sponsored by Mrs. Marcia C. Barnhart; and commissioned 2 November 1944.

=== World War II ===
After shakedown off California, Montrose embarked troops at Seattle, Washington, and steamed to the Philippines, arriving at Leyte 21 February, to prepare for the invasion of the Okinawa.

==== Invasion of Okinawa ====
Montrose participated in the landings in Kerama Retto 26 March, and on 2 April, shot down two kamikazes. She steamed to Menna-shima off Okinawa 15 April, and disembarked units of the 306th Field Artillery. Four days later she took part in a diversionary feint on the southwest tip of Okinawa, returning to Menna Shima 23 April. Leaving the Ryukus she sailed to Ulithi with Army casualties, en route to San Francisco to embark more troops. She debarked these units at Manila 27 July.

For the next 2 months she shuttled troops between the Philippines and Hawaii. From 25 August to 24 October, Montrose was busy carrying occupation troops to Sasebo, Kyūshū.

==== Decommissioning ====
She was decommissioned on 26 October 1946, and was assigned to the Pacific Reserve Fleet at Stockton, California.

=== Korean War ===
After hostilities broke out in Korea, Montrose recommissioned 12 September 1950, and arrived Yokosuka, Japan, 8 January 1951, to help repel the invasion by North Korea. She took troops to Inchon early in 1951; and, in April, after a run to Hong Kong, she steamed for the California coast. She returned to Yokosuka 30 July 1952, and joined TF 90, supporting operations off Korea, until returning to San Diego 6 December 1952.

=== Peacetime operations ===
She returned to Japan in March 1954 and took part in training exercises from Iwo Jima to Korea.

==== Operation Passage to Freedom ====
North Vietnamese refugees on the ship en route to Saigon

When war threatened in Indochina, she sailed to Saigon. Leaving Saigon 9 August, she proceeded to Haiphong to evacuate refugees from there to South Vietnam as part of Operation Passage to Freedom. By 12 September, Montrose had evacuated 9,060 people. She sailed home, arriving San Diego 21 November.

==== Transport and training missions ====
In March 1955, Montrose travelled again to Japan, disembarking members of the 3rd Marine Division. Between April and November, she helped train South Korean amphibious forces and operated off the Japanese coast, until steaming to San Diego in November. She spent the early part of 1956 in training, before proceeding to the Far East for operations in the Bay of Siam in October. She arrived San Diego 13 April 1957, and operated off the California coast for the next 5 months.

In September, she took part in cold weather landing exercises near Kodiak, Alaska, then remained on the west coast until 12 June, when she sailed for Japan. Between 1958 and 1965, she operated off the California coast, and made several voyages to the Far East.

=== Vietnam War ===
During the summer of 1965, Montrose visited San Francisco, Puget Sound, and Hawaii as part of the Pacific Midshipman Training Squadron. With the situation in South Vietnam becoming more precarious, Montrose left San Diego 23 August 1965, to begin training off Okinawa. In November, she conducted several successful strikes against the Vietcong, the first attack coming at Lang Keaa. The following month she participated in a massive attack on the Vietcong near Da Nang. She sailed 25 January 1966 for Cù Lao Ré, and assisted in an attack on a Vietcong stronghold there.

She arrived 14 April, at San Diego, and returned for her 12th deployment in the western Pacific early in 1967. She anchored at the mouth of Lòng Tàu River, South Vietnam, on 23 March, and took part in the establishment of a powerful riverine force. While delivering supplies at Đông Hà 25 May, Montrose came under hostile fire. She arrived 16 September 1968, at San Diego, and began preparation for a return trip to the western Paciflc into 1969.

=== Final decommissioning ===
Montrose was decommissioned and struck from the Naval register on 2 November 1969. The Navy returned permanent custody to the Maritime Administration (MARAD), 4 June 1970, who immediately sold her for scrapping to Zidell Corporation, Portland, Oregon, the same day for $100,343.43. She was transferred out of the Bremerton Navy Yard on 10 June 1970.

== Awards ==
Montrose received one battle star for World War II service, three for Korean War service and six for Vietnam War service, giving her a career total of ten battle stars.

== Memorial ==
The ship's bell and a display about the vessel can be seen in the city of Montrose. Because the radio callsign of the Montrose was NPPP, the occasional amateur radio event commemorating this vessel uses the callsign N0P.

== Notes ==
Citations

== Bibliography ==
Online resources

- "Montrose". Dictionary of American Naval Fighting Ships. Naval History and Heritage Command. 11 August 2015. This article incorporates text from this source, which is in the public domain.
- "Kaiser Permanente No. 2, Richmond CA". www.ShipbuildingHistory.com. 13 October 2010.
- "USS Montrose (APA-212)". NavSource. 29 July 2016.
- "Montrose (APA-212)". United States Department of Transportation. Archived from the original on 25 February 2016.
