= USS Turner (DD-648) =

Gleaves-class destroyer

Coordinates: 40°27′00″N 73°48′00″W

- Undated photo of USS Turner on the East River in New York City near the Williamsburg Bridge

History

United States
- Name: USS Turner
- Namesake: Daniel Turner
- Builder: Federal Shipbuilding and Drydock Company
- Laid down: 16 November 1942
- Launched: 28 February 1943
- Commissioned: 15 April 1943
- Fate: Sank, 3 January 1944
- Stricken: 8 April 1944

General characteristics
- Class & type: Gleaves-class destroyer
- Displacement: 1,630 long tons (1,656 t)
- Length: 348 ft 3 in (106.15 m)
- Beam: 36 ft 1 in (11.00 m)
- Draft: 11 ft 10 in (3.61 m)
- Installed power: 50,000 shp (37,000 kW)
- Propulsion: 2 × geared turbines; 4 × boilers; 2 × shafts
- Speed: 37.4 kn (43.0 mph; 69.3 km/h)
- Range: 6,500 nmi (7,500 mi; 12,000 km) at 12 kn (14 mph; 22 km/h)
- Complement: 16 officers, 260 enlisted
- Armament: 4 × 5 in (127 mm)/38 cal DP guns; 4 × 40 mm (1.6 in) guns; 7 × 20 mm (0.79 in) AA guns; 5 × 21 in (533 mm) torpedo tubes (5 Mark 15 torpedoes); 6 × depth charge projectors; 2 × depth charge tracks

USS Turner (DD-648), was a Gleaves-class destroyer of the United States Navy. She was commissioned on 15 April 1943 and sank after suffering internal explosions on 3 January 1944.

== Service history ==
=== Commission ===
Turner was named for Captain Daniel Turner and was laid down on 16 November 1942 at Kearny, New Jersey, by the Federal Shipbuilding & Drydock Co. and launched on 28 February 1943. The ship was sponsored by Mrs. Louis E. Denfeld and commissioned on 15 April 1943 at the New York Navy Yard.

=== Convoy duty ===
Turner completed outfitting at the New York Navy Yard and then conducted shakedown and antisubmarine warfare training out of Casco Bay, Maine until early June. On the 9th, she returned to New York to prepare for her first assignment: a three-day training cruise with the newly commissioned aircraft carrier Bunker Hill. Returning to New York on 22 June, she departed again the next day on her first real wartime assignment, service in the screen of a transatlantic convoy UGS 11. First, she sailed with a portion of that convoy to Norfolk, Virginia, arriving that same day. On 24 June, the convoy departed Hampton Roads and shaped a course eastward across the Atlantic. After an uneventful voyage, she escorted her convoy into port at Casablanca, French Morocco, on 18 July. She departed with return convoy GUS 10 on 23 July and arrived back in New York on 9 August. Later that month, she was in the screen of a convoy to Guantanamo Bay, Cuba, making a brief stop at Hampton Roads along the way. On the return trip, she rendezvoused with the British carrier HMS Victorious and accompanied her to Norfolk.

=== Anti-submarine duty ===
During the first two weeks of September, Turner conducted anti-submarine warfare (ASW) training at Casco Bay, Maine, and then returned to New York to prepare for her second transatlantic voyage. On 21 September, the destroyer headed south to Norfolk. She arrived there on 23 September and, the following day, headed out across the Atlantic with her convoy. After an 18-day passage, during which she made one depth charge attack on a sound contact, Turner arrived at Casablanca on 12 October. Four days later, she departed again and headed for Gibraltar to join another convoy. The warship reached the strategic base on 17 October and, after two days in port, stood out to join the screen of convoy GUS 18.

On the night of 23 October, Turner was acting as an advance ASW escort for the convoy when she picked up an unidentified surface contact on her SG radar. At 19:43, about 11 minutes after the initial radar contact, Turner's lookouts made visual contact with what proved to be a German submarine running on the surface, decks awash, at about 500 yd (460 m) distance. Almost simultaneously, Turner turned hard to starboard and opened fire with her 5-inch (127 mm), Bofors, and Oerlikon guns. During the next few seconds, the destroyer scored one 5 in (127 mm) hit on the U-boat's conning tower as well as several 40- and 20-millimeter hits there and elsewhere. The submarine began to dive immediately and deprived Turner of any opportunity to ram her. However, while the U-boat made her dive, Turner began a depth-charge attack. She fired two charges from her port K-gun battery, and both appeared to hit the water just above the submerged U-boat. Then, as the destroyer swung around above the U-boat, Turner rolled a single depth charge off her stern. Soon after the three depth charges exploded, Turner crewmen heard a fourth explosion, the shock from which caused the destroyer to lose power to her SG and SD radars, to the main battery, and to her sound gear. It took her at least 15 minutes to restore power entirely.

Meanwhile, she began a search for evidence to corroborate a sinking or regain contact with the target. At about 20:17, she picked up another contact on the SG radar — located about 1,600 yd (1,500 m) off the port beam. Turner came left and headed toward the contact. Not long thereafter, her bridge watch sighted an object lying low in the water. Those witnesses definitely identified the object as a submarine which appeared to be sinking by the stern. Unfortunately, Turner had to break contact with the object in order to avoid a collision with another of the convoy's escorts. By the time she was able to resume her search, the object had disappeared. Turner and the destroyer escort Sturtevant remained in the area and conducted further searches for the submarine or for proof of her sinking but failed in both instances. All that can be said is she probably heavily damaged an enemy submarine and may have sunk her. No conclusive evidence exists to support the latter conclusion. The attacked sub was not U-190.

=== Destruction ===
On 24 October, the two escorts rejoined the convoy, and the crossing continued peacefully. When the convoy divided itself into two segments according to destination on 4 November, Turner took station as one of the escorts for the Norfolk-bound portion. Two days later, she saw her charges safely into port and then departed to return to New York where she arrived on 7 November.

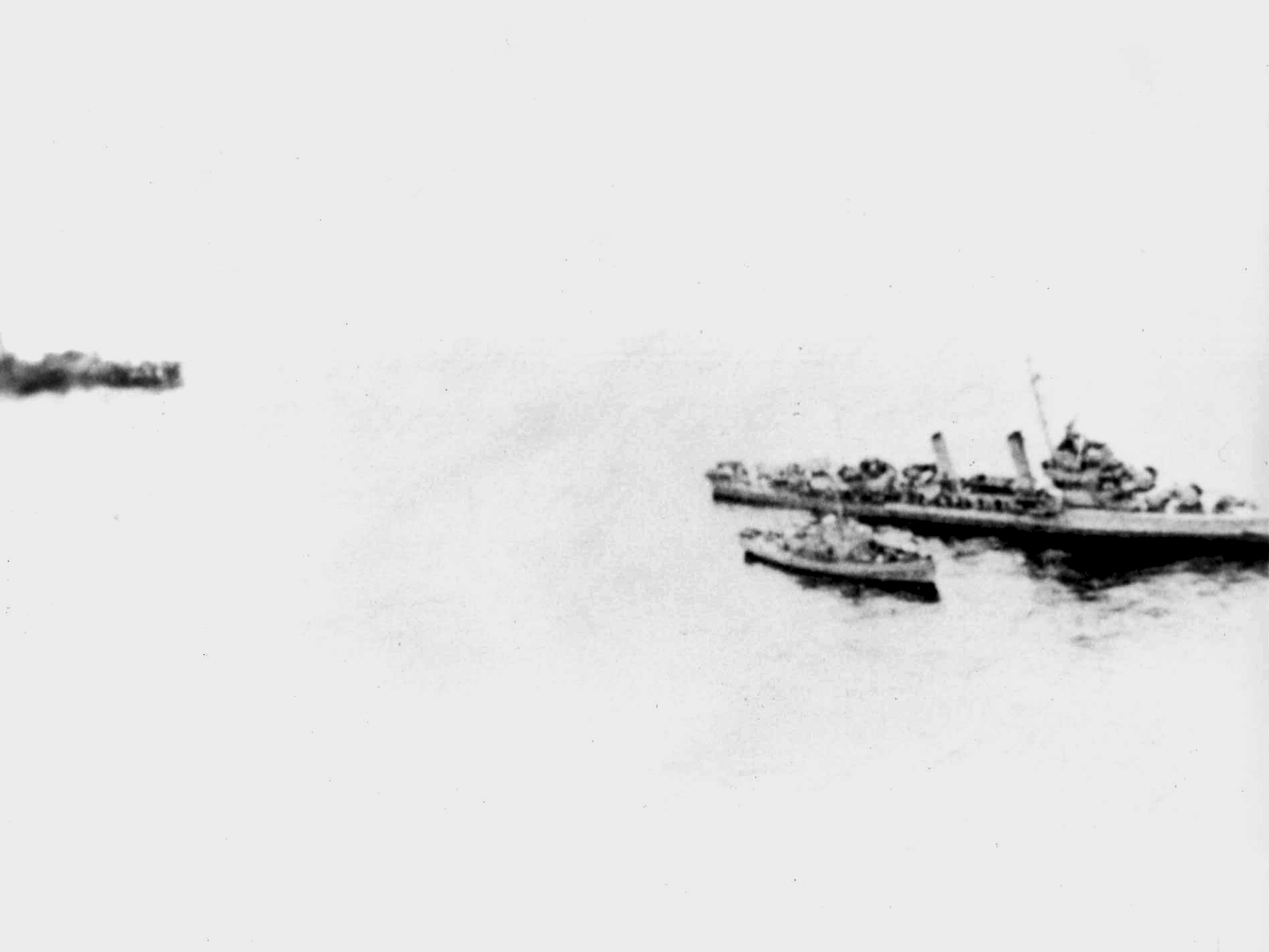
USS Turner off Sandy Hook on 3 January 1944.

Following ten days in port, the warship conducted ASW exercises briefly at Casco Bay before returning to Norfolk to join another transatlantic convoy. She departed Norfolk with her third and final convoy on 23 November and saw the convoy safely across the Atlantic. On 1 January 1944, near the end of the return voyage, that convoy split into two parts according to destination as Turner's previous one had done. Turner joined the New York-bound contingent and shaped a course for that port. She arrived off Ambrose Light late on 2 January and anchored.

Early the following morning, the destroyer suffered a series of shattering internal explosions. By 06:50, she took on a 16° starboard list; and explosions, mostly in the ammunition stowage areas, continued to stagger the stricken destroyer. Then, at about 07:50, a singularly violent explosion caused her to capsize and sink. The tip of her bow remained above water until about 08:27 when she disappeared completely taking with her 15 officers and 123 men.

After nearby ships picked up the survivors of the sunken destroyer, the injured were taken to the hospital at Sandy Hook, New Jersey. A United States Coast Guard Sikorsky HNS-1 flown by Lieutenant Commander Frank A. Erickson — the first use of a helicopter in a life-saving role — flew two cases of blood plasma, lashed to the helicopter's floats, from New York to Sandy Hook. The plasma saved the lives of many of Turner's injured crewmen. Turner's name was stricken from the Naval Vessel Register on 8 April 1944.

== Awards ==
- American Campaign Medal
- European-African-Middle Eastern Campaign Medal with battle star
- World War II Victory Medal
