= USS Turner (DD-834) =

Gearing-class destroyer

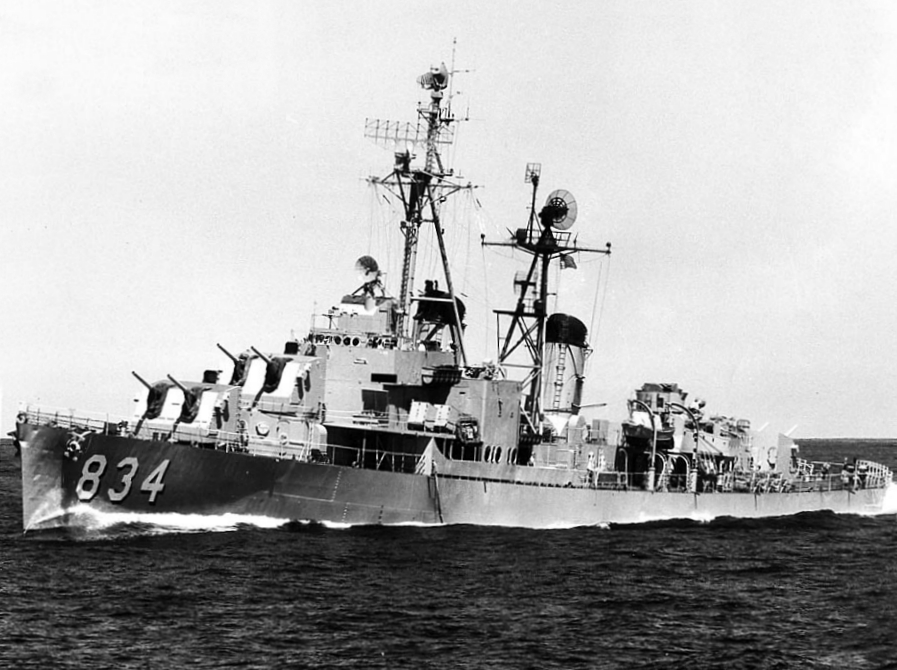
- USS Turner (DDR-834) underway in 1952

History

United States
- Name: USS Turner
- Builder: Bath Iron Works, Bath, Maine
- Laid down: 13 November 1944
- Launched: 8 April 1945
- Commissioned: 12 June 1945
- Decommissioned: 26 September 1969
- Reclassified: DDR-834, 18 March 1949
- Stricken: 26 September 1969
- Identification: Callsign: NBBE; Hull number: DD-834
- Fate: Sold for scrap, 13 October 1970

General characteristics
- Class & type: Gearing-class destroyer
- Displacement: 3,460 long tons (3,516 t) full
- Length: 390 ft 6 in (119.02 m)
- Beam: 40 ft 10 in (12.45 m)
- Draft: 14 ft 4 in (4.37 m)
- Propulsion: Geared turbines, 2 shafts, 60,000 shp (45 MW)
- Speed: 35 knots (65 km/h; 40 mph)
- Range: 4,500 nmi (8,300 km) at 20 kn (37 km/h; 23 mph)
- Complement: 336
- Armament: 6 × 5"/38 caliber guns; 12 × 40 mm AA guns; 11 × 20 mm AA guns; 10 × 21 inch (533 mm) torpedo tubes; 6 × depth charge projectors; 2 × depth charge tracks

USS Turner (DD/DDR-834) was a Gearing-class destroyer of the United States Navy, the third Navy ship named for Captain Daniel Turner (1794?–1850).

Turner was laid down on 13 November 1944 at Bath, Maine, by the Bath Iron Works Corp.; launched on 8 April 1945; sponsored by Miss Louise Leahy, granddaughter of Fleet Admiral William D. Leahy; and commissioned on 12 June 1945 at the Boston Navy Yard.

== Service history ==
=== 1945–1948 ===
Immediately following her commissioning, Turner began undergoing conversion to destroyer picket ship at Boston, Mass. while her crew attended intensive specialized schools in preparation for picket duty. In mid-July, she arrived at Guantanamo Bay and, while she was undergoing shakedown in Cuban waters, Japan capitulated, ending World War II.

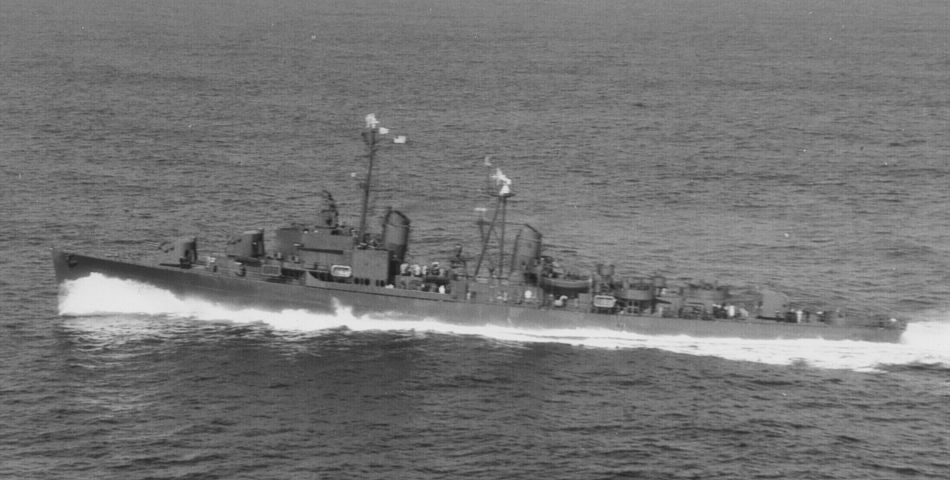
USS Turner in 1945

Late in August, the ship returned to Boston for post-shakedown availability. In the second week of September, she resumed training exercises in the Caribbean and in Atlantic coastal waters. On 8 October, she departed Norfolk, Virginia and steamed — via Pensacola, Florida, the Panama Canal, and San Diego, California — to Hawaii, arriving at Pearl Harbor on 28 November. There, she prepared for duty in the Tokyo area and, on 10 December, departed the Hawaiian Islands and proceeded to Japan.

She operated out of Japanese ports with Task Group 55.4, Task Force 54, and other elements of the 5th Fleet until 24 March 1946 when she departed Yokosuka and proceeded via Midway to Pearl Harbor. She remained at Oahu until 29 May when she got underway and proceeded to Roi Island. In June and July, she participated in "Operation Crossroads" — the atomic bomb tests at Bikini Atoll — during which she was flagship of Destroyer Squadron 5 and supported air operations for Section Baker of the tests. She returned to Pearl Harbor on 30 July, got underway again on 7 August, and steamed into San Diego harbor on the 13th. The ship operated along the west coast until August 1947, mainly participating in hunter-killer and fleet exercises.

After loading ammunition at San Pedro, the destroyer, in company with Destroyer Division 132, departed that port on 26 August 1947; steamed via the Hawaiian Islands and Japan; and arrived at Tsingtao on 20 September. She visited various China coast ports before her return to San Diego on 5 May 1948. For nearly a year, she operated out of California ports, conducting reserve training cruises and inter-type exercises.

=== 1949–1958 ===
Turner was reclassified as a radar picket destroyer on 18 March 1949. She departed San Diego on 4 April, steamed via the Panama Canal, and arrived at Newport, Rhode Island, on 21 April 1949. There, she received additional electronic equipment enabling her to carry out her new duties. Throughout the 1950s, she conducted reserve training cruises, participated in fleet exercises, and frequently made 6th Fleet deployments. On her eighth Mediterranean cruise in 1958, she acted as a picket ship for Task Force 61 during the Lebanon crisis.

=== 1959–1969 ===
In 1959, she shifted homeport to Mayport, Florida, and continued to pursue the same duties. At the Norfolk Naval Shipyard in 1960, she underwent a Fleet Rehabilitation and Modernization (FRAM) overhaul which improved her radar and sonar capabilities in anti-aircraft and anti-submarine warfare. In 1961, the Charleston Naval Shipyard installed a new variable-depth sonar, adding to Turner's submarine detection equipment. Into the 1960s, she alternated frequent Mediterranean cruises with routine Atlantic training exercises, Atlantic picket duty, and special assignments. In 1960, she joined Task Force 140, the Project Mercury Recovery Force; and, in 1964, she added a Red Sea and Persian Gulf deployment to a Mediterranean voyage. In November and December of that year, she remained on station in the Caribbean in support of the Gemini II space shot.

Armed conflict flared in the Caribbean in April 1965; and, from 8 through 25 May, Turner operated with Task Force 128 in support of the American presence in the Dominican Republic. She again provided assistance to the American space program in February 1966 when she patrolled an alternate recovery station — at a point midway between South America and Africa, not far from the equator — as a backup site for a Project Apollo test flight.

While in the Caribbean on routine training in August 1967, Turner conducted a search for a disabled motor boat which had been adrift in the Windward Passage with 11 passengers on board. After a four-hour hunt, she located and assisted the boat and its occupants. During her 14th Mediterranean deployment late in January 1968, she directed the fruitless search for the missing Israeli submarine INS Dakar; and, while operating with USS Independence in the Mediterranean in October of that year, Turner rescued two survivors of a downed plane.

In December 1968, Turner, along with the USS Dyess, spent several days cruising the Black Sea. In those days, the Soviet Union considered the Black Sea more or less a Soviet lake. Although the US was in the habit of sending two destroyers to the Black Sea for a few days every six months, the Soviets raised a stink this time, claiming that the Dyess had nuclear capabilities, and threatening to take action against the ships if they passed into the disputed waters. During the cruise the Turner and Dyess were shadowed by soviet destroyers and buzzed by soviet planes but there were no attempts by the Soviets to interfere. Once the cruise ended the ships spent the rest of the month in Athens, Greece.

Early in 1969, she completed her 15th Mediterranean deployment and returned to the United States. In April, she arrived at Mayport and was decommissioned there on 26 September. Her name was struck from the Navy list that same day, and, on 13 October 1970, she was sold to Southern Scrap Material, Ltd., New Orleans, Louisiana, for scrapping.
