= 127 Squadron =

127 Squadron may refer to:

- 127 Squadron, Republic of Singapore Air Force
- No. 127 Squadron RCAF, Canada
- No. 127 Squadron RAF, United Kingdom
- 127th Command and Control Squadron, United States Air Force
- VAW-127, United States Navy
- VFA-127, United States Navy
- VPB-127, United States Navy
