= John B. Nathman =

United States Navy admiral

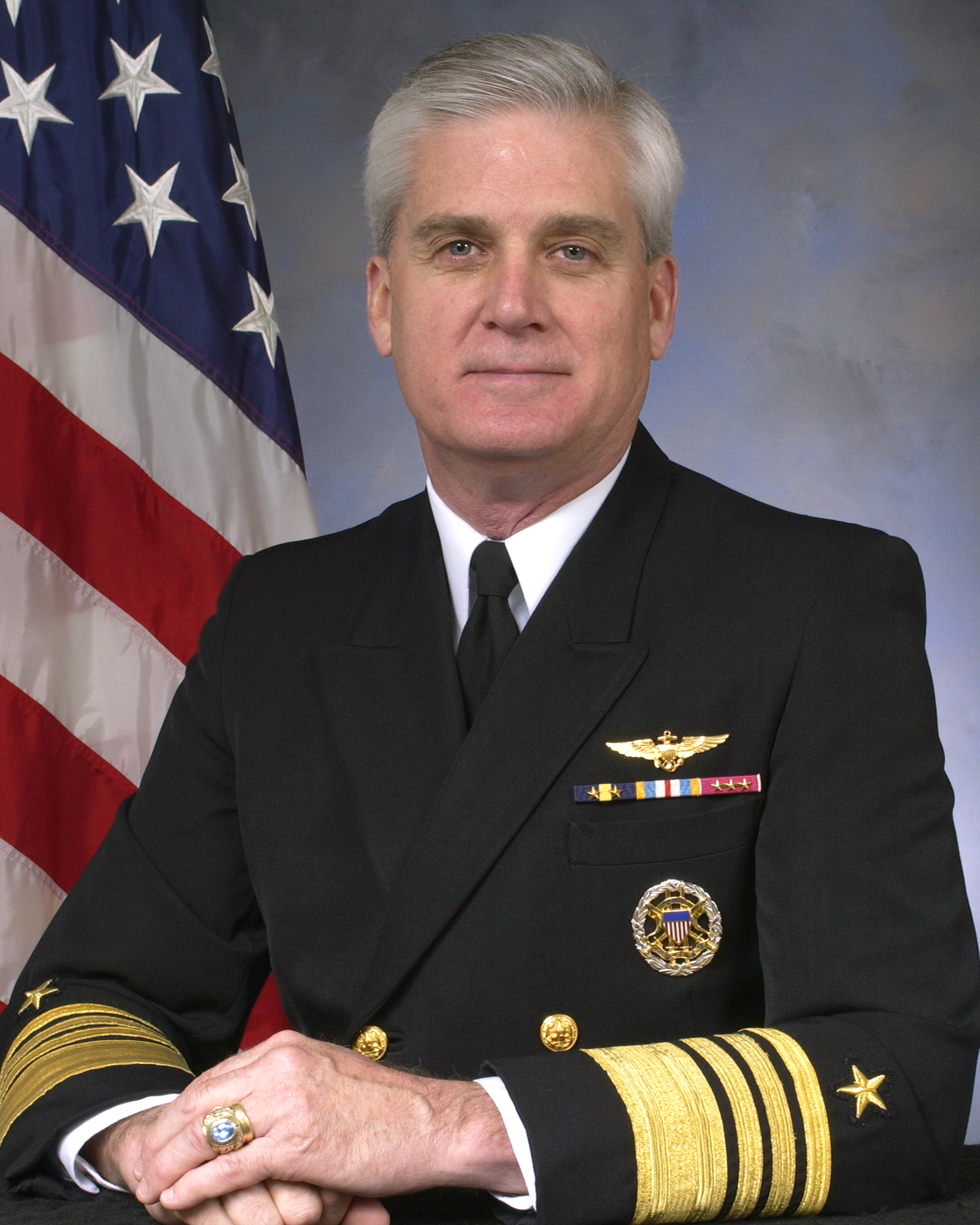
- Admiral John B. Nathman
- Born: April 11, 1948 (age 78); San Antonio, Texas, US
- Military career
- Branch: United States Navy
- Service years: 1970–2007
- Rank: Admiral
- Commands: United States Fleet Forces Command; Vice Chief of Naval Operations; Naval Air Forces; Carrier Group Seven; USS Nimitz (CVN-68); USS La Salle (AGF-3); VFA-132
- Awards: Navy Distinguished Service Medal (4); Defense Superior Service Medal; Legion of Merit (4); Bronze Star Medal with Combat V

John B. Nathman (born April 11, 1948) is a retired United States Navy admiral who served as the Commander, United States Fleet Forces Command until 17 May 2007.

== Early career ==
A native of San Antonio, Texas, Nathman graduated with distinction from the United States Naval Academy in 1970. In 1972, he qualified as a Naval Aviator, receiving the Naval Air Training Command's Outstanding Pilot Graduate Award while also completing a Master of Science degree in Aerospace Engineering.

Nathman has served in a variety of sea, shore and joint assignments, and flown over 40 different types of aircraft during his career. At sea, he flew the F-4 Phantom II with Fighter Squadron Two Thirteen (VF-213) and the F-14 Tomcat with Fighter Squadron Fifty-One (VF-51). He then transitioned to the F/A-18 Hornet, subsequently commanding Strike Fighter Squadron One Thirty-Two (VFA-132) and leading his squadron in the first F/A-18 combat sorties against Libya in 1986. Nathman reported to the aircraft carrier USS Nimitz (CVN-68) in 1987 as executive officer, and subsequently assumed command of USS La Salle (AGF-3), the flagship for Commander, Middle East Force (COMIDEASTFOR), during Operations Desert Shield and Desert Storm. Nathman returned to the USS Nimitz (CVN-68) as its commanding officer from 1992 to 1994.

Ashore, Nathman was assigned to the United States Air Force Test Pilot School at Edwards Air Force Base, California, graduating with distinction in 1976. He also served at the Navy Fighter Weapons School (TOPGUN) at Naval Air Station Miramar, California, and oversaw the advanced tactical training of the naval aviators and naval flight officers from the Navy and Marine Corps fighter communities attending TOPGUN. From 1982 to 1984, Nathman was on an exchange assignment with the United States Air Force as the senior naval test pilot flying all project aircraft with the 4477th Test and Evaluation Squadron (4477 TES) at Nellis Air Force Base, Nevada. During this time, he flew 61 missions in MiG-21s and 52 missions in MiG-23s as "Bandit 29".

== Flag officer ==
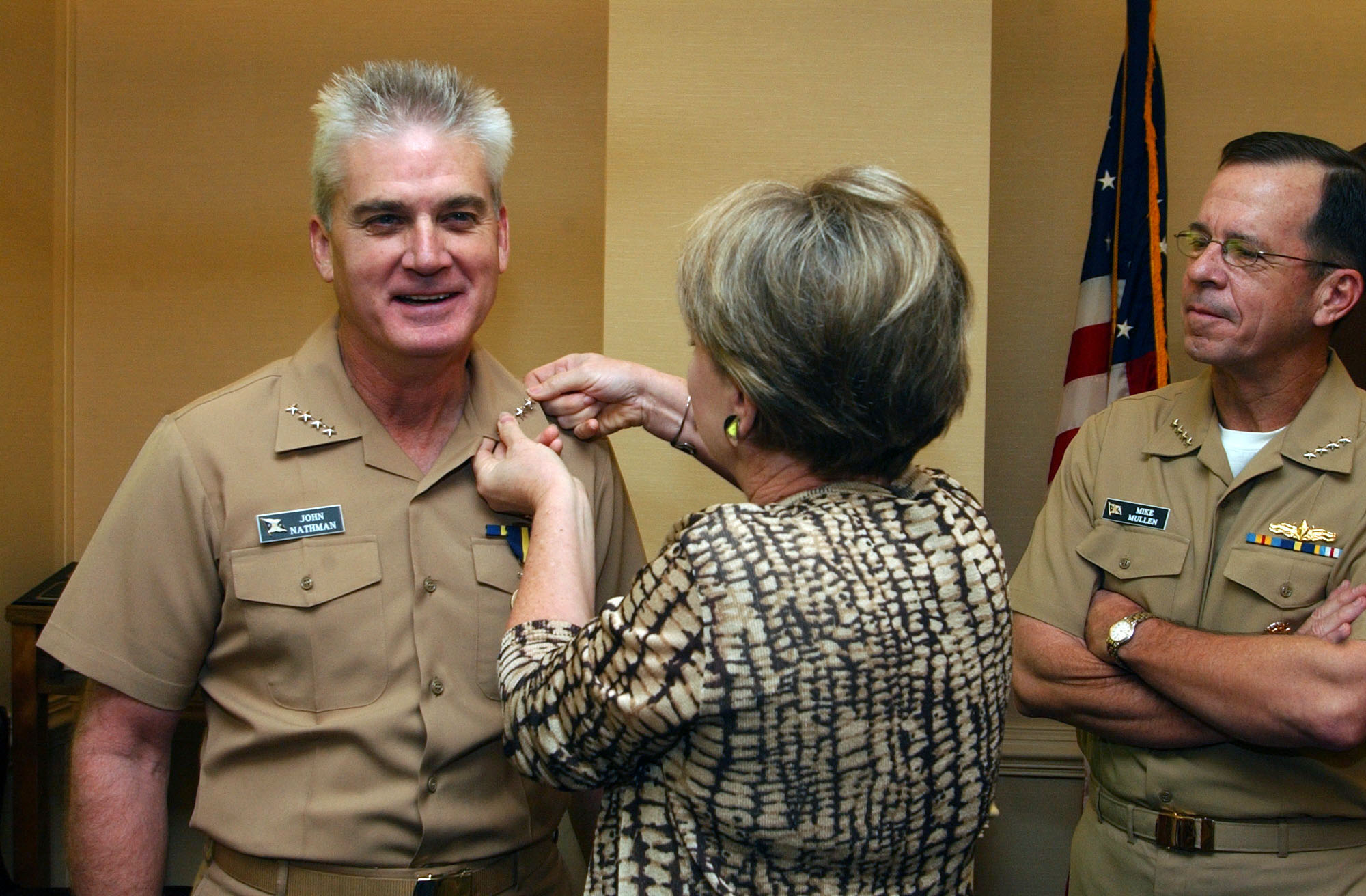
Nathman, incoming VCNO is pinned with his four-star insignia by his wife Sue as CNO Michael Mullen looks on, August 23, 2004.

Upon his selection to flag rank in 1994, Nathman served on the NATO staff of Commander, Allied Forces Southern Europe (AF SOUTH), and as Director of Logistics for Commander, NATO Implementation Force (IFOR) during its first out-of-area deployment to Bosnia. In 1996, he commanded Carrier Group Seven, NIMITZ Carrier Strike Group and Battle Force FIFTY in the Persian Gulf. Nathman subsequently served as Director, Air Warfare, on the Chief of Naval Operations staff in Washington, D.C. In August 2000, he took command of Naval Air Force, United States Pacific Fleet and was designated Commander, Naval Air Forces in October 2001. In August 2002, Nathman was assigned as the Deputy Chief of Naval Operations for Warfare Requirements and Programs (N6/N7) at the Pentagon.

Nathman served as the 33rd Vice Chief of Naval Operations from August 2004 to February 2005. He assumed command of United States Fleet Forces Command on February 18, 2005, and subsequently retired.

== Awards and decorations ==
- Naval Aviator Badge
- Office of the Joint Chiefs of Staff Identification Badge

Navy Distinguished Service Medal (with 3 golden award stars)
Defense Superior Service Medal
Legion of Merit (with 3 award stars)
Bronze Star Medal with Combat V
Defense Meritorious Service Medal
Meritorious Service Medal (with 2 award stars)
Navy Commendation Medal (with Combat V and 2 award stars)
Air Force Achievement Medal
Combat Action Ribbon
Joint Meritorious Unit Award
Navy Unit Commendation (with 2 service stars)
Navy Meritorious Unit Commendation (with 3 service stars)
Navy "E" Ribbon w/ 1 Battle E device
Navy Expeditionary Medal
National Defense Service Medal (with 2 service stars)
Armed Forces Expeditionary Medal (with 2 service stars)
Southwest Asia Service Medal (with 3 service stars)
Armed Forces Service Medal
Humanitarian Service Medal
Navy Sea Service Deployment Ribbon (with 6 service stars)
Navy and Marine Corps Overseas Service Ribbon
NATO Medal for the former Yugoslavia
Kuwait Liberation Medal (Saudi Arabia)
Kuwait Liberation Medal (Kuwait)
Navy Expert Rifleman Medal
Navy Expert Pistol Shot Medal

== Post-military ==
On 2 October 2008, Nathman published a commentary in the Virginian-Pilot praising presidential candidate Barack Obama. In February 2012, he was named a co-chair of the re-election campaign of President Obama. On 6 September 2012, Nathman spoke at the 2012 Democratic National Convention.In July 2022, he joined with other former U.S. military leaders in condemning former president and commander in chief, Donald Trump. "While rioters tried to thwart the peaceful transfer of power and ransacked the Capitol on Jan. 6, 2021, the president and commander in chief, Donald Trump, abdicated his duty to preserve, protect and defend the Constitution.
