= VA-55 =

VA-55 may refer to:

- VA-55 (U.S. Navy)
- Virginia State Route 55
