= Carrier Air Wing Thirteen =

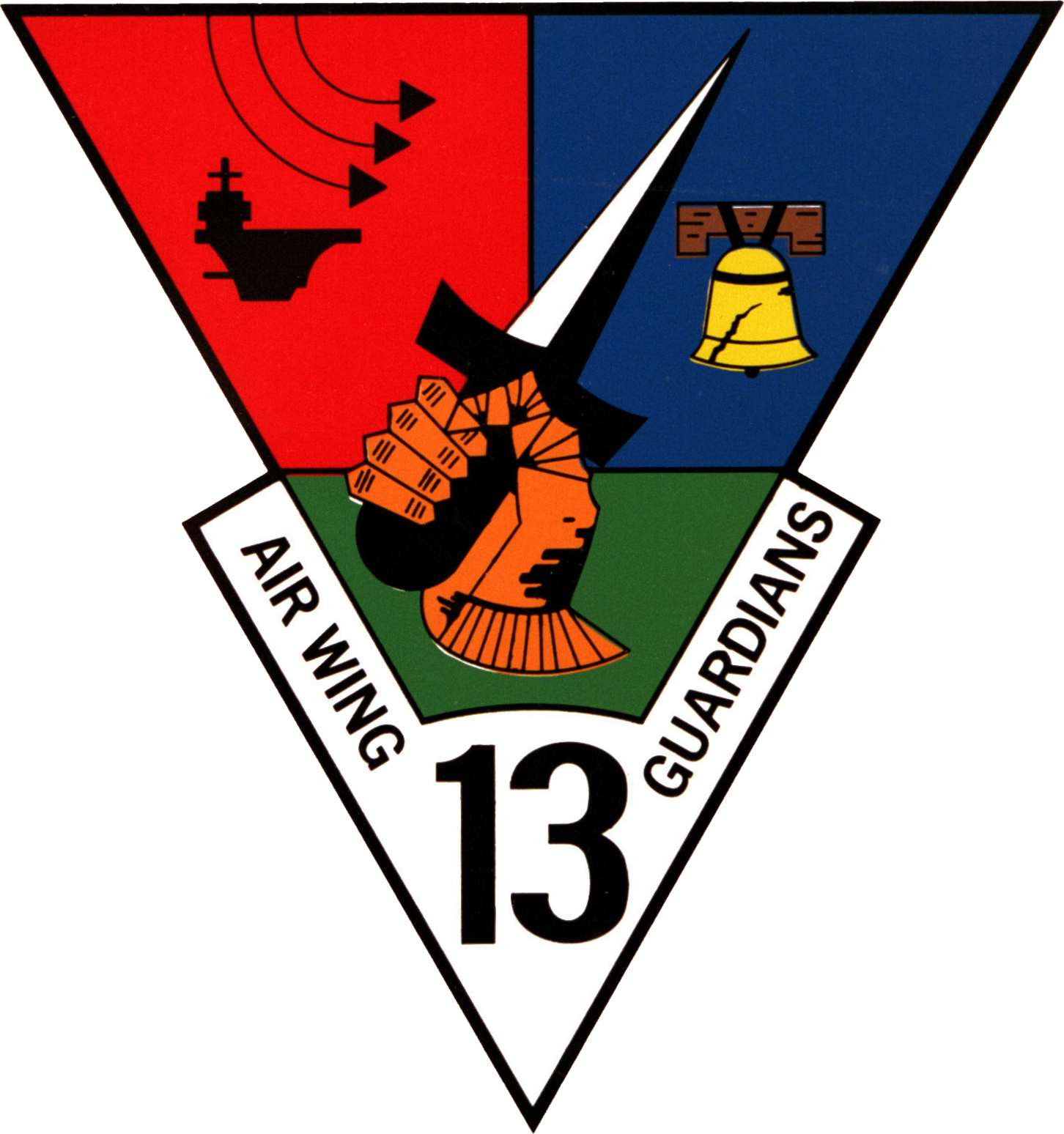
- Active: 1 March 1984 – 1 January 1991
- Country: United States
- Branch: United States Navy
- Type: Carrier air wing
- Engagements: Cold War

Carrier Air Wing Thirteen (CVW-13) was a carrier air wing of the United States Navy established for a short period at the end of the Cold War. There were three previous units which had been named Carrier Air Group Thirteen (CVG-13), dating as far back as 1942, though each of these units has a distinct lineage.

== Carrier Air Wing THIRTEEN History ==
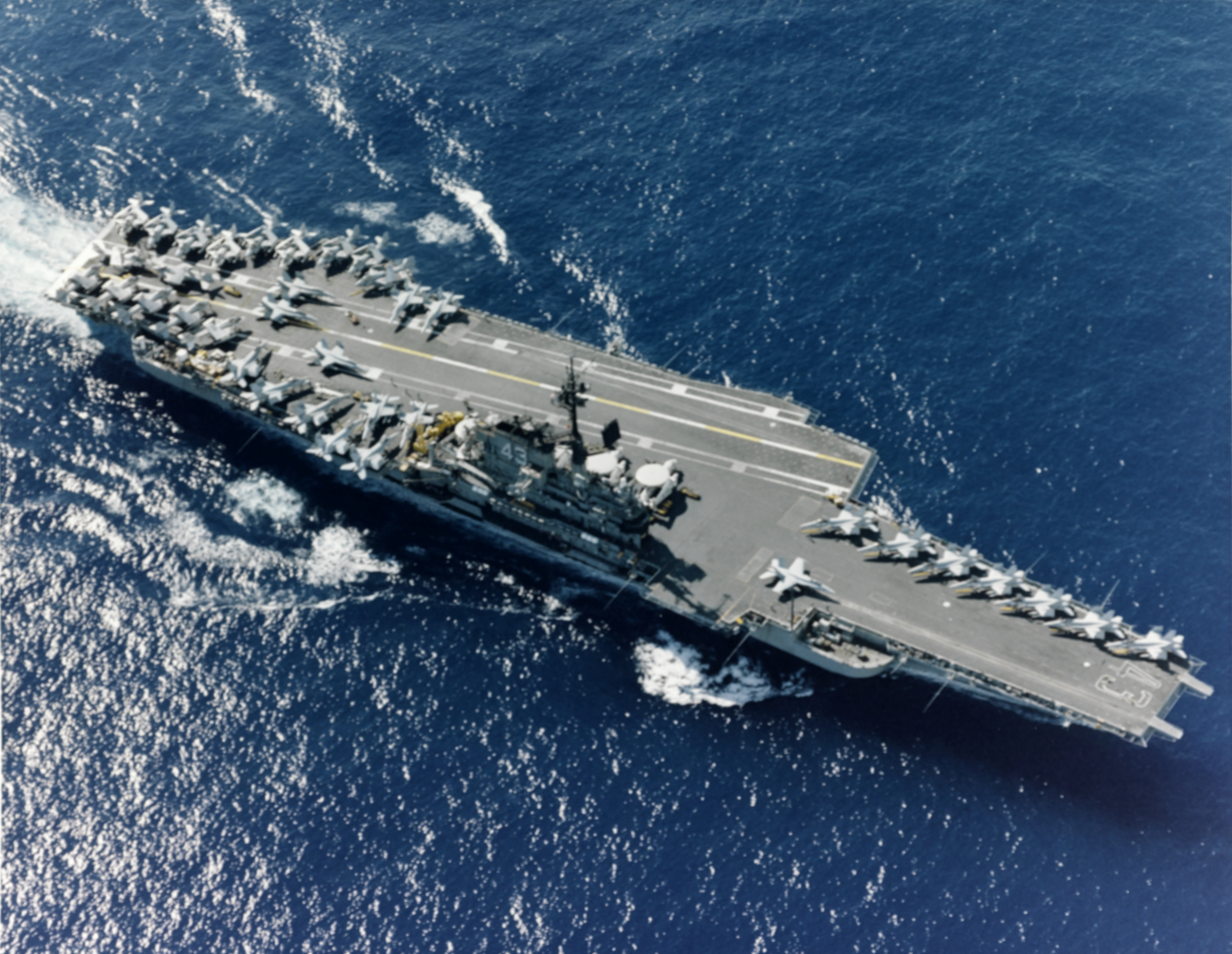
CVW-13 aircraft on the deck of USS Coral Sea, 1986

Carrier Air Wing Thirteen was established on 1 March 1984. CVW-13 served three Mediterranean deployments aboard USS Coral Sea (CV-43). The group's first deployment to the Mediterranean Sea from October 1985 to May 1986 was done with the McDonnell Douglas F/A-18A Hornets of VFA-131, VFA-132, VMFA-314, and VMFA-323, Grumman A-6E Intruders of VA-55, Grumman E-2 Hawkeyes from VAW-127, Northrop Grumman EA-6B Prowlers of VAQ-135, Douglas EA-3 Skywarriors of VQ-2, and SH-3H Sea Kings from HS-17. During the cruise, CVW-13 participated in Operation Eldorado Canyon, striking several targets in Libya. During the cruise, the wing was commanded by Commander Byron L. Duff. The wing deployed on two more Med Cruises aboard Coral Sea before being disestablished on 1 January 1991.

Major overseas deployments by Carrier Air Wing Thirteen
Cruise dates	Aircraft carrier	Area	Strike Fighter	Attack	Other
1 October 1985 to 19 May 1986	USS Coral Sea (CV-43)	Mediterranean Sea	VFA-131(F/A-18A); VFA-132(F/A-18A); VMFA-314(F/A-18A); VMFA-323(F/A-18A)	VA-55 (A-6E); VAQ-135 (EA-6B)	VAW-127 (E-2); VQ-2 det (EA-3B); HS-17 (SH-3H)
15 October 1987 to 12 April 1988	USS Coral Sea (CV-43)	Mediterranean Sea	VFA-131(F/A-18A); VFA-136(F/A-18A); VFA-137(F/A-18A)	VA-65 (A-6E); VA-55 (A-6E); VAQ-133 (EA-6B)	VAW-127 (E-2); HS-17 (SH-3H)
31 May 1989 to 30 September 1989	USS Coral Sea (CV-43)	Mediterranean Sea	VFA-131(F/A-18A); VFA-132(F/A-18A); VFA-137(F/A-18A); VMFA-451(F/A-18A)	VA-65 (A-6E); VAQ-133 (EA-6B)	VAW-127 (E-2); HS-17 (SH-3H)

== Carrier Air Groups designated CVG-13 ==
There were three Carrier Air Groups designated Carrier Air Group THIRTEEN which existed between 1943 and 1962. All three were separate and distinct units and none of the three share a lineage with each other or with Carrier Air Wing THIRTEEN

=== First Carrier Air Group designated Carrier Air Group THIRTEEN, 1943-1945 ===
The first Carrier Air Group Thirteen was established on 2 November 1943 and served for the duration of World War II. The air group served aboard USS Franklin (CV-13) in the Pacific. With the draw-down of United States military forces after the war, the group was disestablished on 20 October 1945.

=== Second Carrier Air Group designated Carrier Air Group THIRTEEN, 1944-1949 ===
The second Carrier Air Group Thirteen was originally established as Carrier Air Group Eighty One (CVG-81) on 1 March 1944. On 1 November 1946 the Group was redesignated CVAG-13 and on 1 September 1948 it was redesignated CVG-13.

==== CVG-81 ====
As originally formed, the group consisted of three squadrons giving it a balance of fighter, torpedo-bombing, and dive-bombing capabilities. As per Navy standards, the squadrons were numbered to match the air group, thus being designated VF-81 (fighter), VT-81 (torpedo), and VB-81 (dive bomber). The group was embarked on USS Hancock (CV-19) for transportation to Hawaii and then spent is first deployment aboard USS Wasp (CV-18) between 10 November 1944 and 13 March 1945. During this deployment, Marine squadrons VMF-216 and VMF-217 were attached to the group, adding a significant number of fighter-bombers to the Wasp's complement.

After the war, the air group did a second deployment to the Western Pacific, this time aboard the USS Princeton (CV-37) between 3 July 1946 and 15 April 1947. At this point, a fourth squadron had been added to the group: VBF-81, a fighter-bomber squadron. The unit transited the Panama Canal without VB-81 before embarking on WestPac with its full complement.

==== CVAG-13 ====
Soon after the group returned from this deployment, the Navy changed its system of air group designations to one designating the type of carrier the group was assigned to and thus its general complement of aircraft types. In line with this, CVG-81 was re-designated Attack Carrier Air Group Thirteen (CVAG-13) on 15 November 1946. As an attack carrier air group, the unit was composed of two fighter squadrons (VF-13A and VF-14A) and two attack squadrons (VA-13A and VA-14A). The air group was stationed at NAS San Diego between 1948 and 1949.

==== CVG-13 ====
On 1 September 1948, the Navy reversed course on air group designations, dropping "attack" from them, and re-designating CVAG-13 simply as Carrier Air Group Thirteen (CVG-13). As the second unit to carry this name, its squadrons were also re-designated, with the fighter squadrons becoming VF-131 and VF-132 while the attack squadrons became VA-15 and VA-135. A detachment from HU-2 also was attached to provide the helicopters aboard for transport and rescue duties. CVG-13 once again deployed in the West Pacific on Princeton between 1 October 1948 and 23 December 1948. CVG-13 was disestablished on 30 November 1949.

Major overseas deployments by Carrier Air Group Thirteen
Cruise dates	Aircraft carrier	Area	Fighter	Attack	Detachments
1 October 1948 to 23 December 1948	USS Princeton (CV-37)	Western Pacific Ocean	VF-131; VF-132	VA-15; VA-135	HU-2

=== Third Carrier Air Group designated Carrier Air Group THIRTEEN, 1961-1962 ===
The third Carrier Air Group Thirteen was established on 21 August 1961. It was deployed on shakedown in the Caribbean on USS Constellation (CVA-64) from 3 March 1962 to 6 May 1962. This group was assigned the re-established Fighter Squadrons 131 and 132, Attack Squadrons 133, 134, and 135, and Heavy Attack Squadron 10. Additionally, detachments from HU-2, VAW-12, and VFP-62 were with the group during their deployment. After returning from the cruise, CVG-13 was disestablished on 1 October 1962.
