= VF-132 (1961–1962) =

Fighter Squadron 132
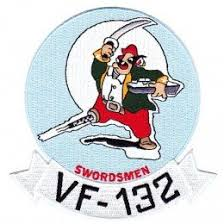
- Active: 21 August 1961 – 1 October 1962
- Country: United States
- Branch: United States Navy
- Role: Fighter aircraft
- Part of: Inactive
- Nickname(s): Swordsmen or "Peg Leg Petes"

Aircraft flown
- Fighter: F-8D Crusader

Fighter Squadron 132 or VF-132 was a short-lived aviation unit of the United States Navy established on 21 August 1961 and disestablished on 1 October 1962.

== Operational history ==
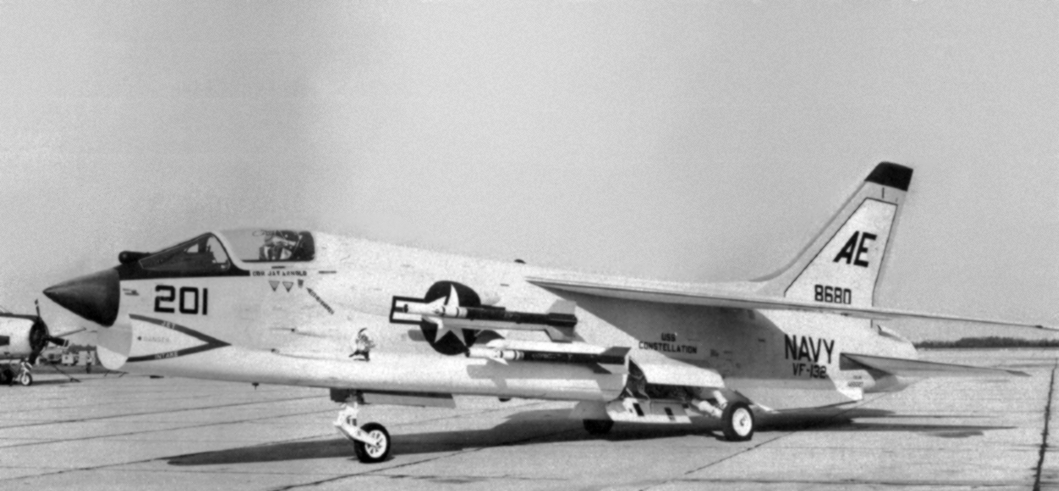
VF-132 F-8D in 1962

VF-132 was established as part of Carrier Air Group 13. It was deployed on a shakedown cruise in the Caribbean on USS Constellation from 3 March to 6 May 1962. After returning from the cruise, CVG-13 and its constituent squadrons were disestablished on 1 October 1962.

== Home port assignments ==
The squadron was assigned to NAS Cecil Field.

== Aircraft assignment ==
- Vought F-8 Crusader

== See also ==
- History of the United States Navy
- List of inactive United States Navy aircraft squadrons
- List of United States Navy aircraft squadrons
