= VAQ-135 =

Electronic Attack Squadron 135
- Active: 15 May 1969 - Present (57 years, 4 months)
- Country: United States
- Branch: United States Navy
- Type: Electronic Attack
- Role: Electronic Warfare
- Part of: Electronic Attack Wing Pacific
- Garrison/HQ: NAS Whidbey Island
- Nickname: World Famous Black Ravens
- Colors: #7bbfe9 #80c242
- Mascot: Raven
- Anniversaries: 15 May 1969
- Equipment: EA-18G
- Engagements: Operation Praying Mantis; Operation Fiery Vigil; Operation Southern Watch; Operation Desert Fox; Operation Enduring Freedom; Operation Iraqi Freedom; Operation Inherent Resolve; Operation Epic Fury
- Decorations: Safety "S" (4); Battle "E"; Armed Forces Expeditionary Medal (5); Navy Expeditionary Medal; Humanitarian Service Medal; Meritorious Unit Commendation (2); CVW-11 Golden Wrench; Navy Unit Commendation (2); Association of Old Crows Outstanding Unit Award (4)
- Website: https://www.airpac.navy.mil/Organization/Electronic-Attack-Squadron-VAQ-135/

Commanders
- Commanding Officer: CDR. Erik “DOM” Dippold
- Executive Officer: CDR. Jeff “Gazer” Pinkerton
- Command Master Chief: CMDCM. Raymond Cabral

Insignia
- Callsign: THUNDER
- Modex: 52X
- Tail Code: NL

Aircraft flown
- Bomber: KA-3B Skywarrior (1969-1973)
- Electronic warfare: EKA-3B Skywarrior (1969-1973); EA-6B Prowler(1973-2011); EA-18G Growler(2011-Present)

Electronic Attack Squadron 135 (VAQ-135), known as the "Black Ravens", is a United States Navy electronic attack squadron that currently operates the EA-18G Growler carrier-based electronic warfare jet aircraft. The squadron is permanently stationed at Naval Air Station Whidbey Island with a radio callsign of "Thunder".

== Early years ==
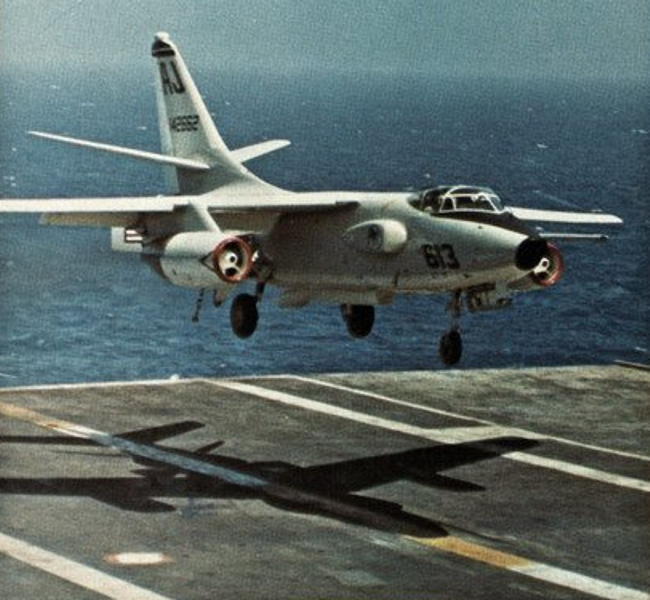
VAQ-135 EKA-3B landing on USS America in 1971

Tactical Electronic Warfare Squadron One Three Five was established on 15 May 1969, to provide electronic warfare and aerial refueling support to carrier air wings. It was stationed at Naval Air Station Alameda. The squadron first flew the EKA-3B Skywarrior and deployed to both the Atlantic and Pacific Fleets.

In 1973, VAQ-135 relocated to NAS Whidbey Island and transitioned to the Grumman EA-6B Prowler.

The squadron first deployed with the EA-6B to the Western Pacific (WESTPAC) and the Indian Ocean from January to September 1976 with Carrier Air Wing 2 (CVW-2) aboard USS Ranger. Following that deployment, VAQ-135 transitioned to the Improved Capability Prowler (ICAP) and became the first fleet EA-6B ICAP squadron. The squadron deployed with Carrier Air Wing 8 (CVW-8) aboard USS Nimitz from November 1977 to July 1978 to the Mediterranean Sea.

In January 1979, VAQ-135 commenced refresher training with Carrier Air Wing 15 (CVW-15) aboard USS Kitty Hawk and deployed to the Western Pacific in May 1979. During deployment, they received the Navy Expeditionary Medal for operations in the Indian Ocean during the Iranian hostage crisis, the Meritorious Unit Commendation, and their first Chief of Naval Operations Safety "S" Award. They again deployed with CVW-15 aboard USS Kitty Hawk from April to November 1981. VAQ-135 participated in several major exercises throughout the Pacific and Indian Oceans and received a second Navy Expeditionary Medal and the Humanitarian Service Medal for their participation in the rescue of Vietnamese boat people.

== 1980s ==
In May 1982, VAQ-135 was assigned to USS America and Carrier Air Wing 1 (CVW-1). After completing work-ups, the squadron was transferred to USS Nimitz and deployed to the Mediterranean Sea in November 1982 later receiving their second Chief of Naval Operations Safety "S" Award.

In 1984, the squadron deployed to USS America and CVW-1 from April until November 1984, receiving their third Chief of Naval Operations Safety "S" Award. In 1985, along with CVW-1 they participated in Ocean Safari ‘85, the largest NATO naval exercise to date, and received their second Meritorious Unit Commendation.

On the morning of 1 January 1986, VAQ-135 was deployed to support Sixth Fleet Battle Group operations in the Mediterranean Sea. Within 48 hours, they had sortied from NAS Whidbey Island, joined their new air wing Carrier Air Wing 13 (CVW-13) at sea on board USS Coral Sea and supported contingency operations underway in the central Mediterranean Sea. For the next five months, with no in-theater supply support, the squadron provided electronic warfare support to U.S. naval forces operating off the coast of Libya. The squadron took part in the successful strikes in the Gulf of Sidra in March 1986 and provided key close-support jamming services in the successful strikes on the Benina/Benghazi airfields in April of that year. As a result, the squadron was awarded two Navy Unit Commendations, the Armed Forces Expeditionary Medal, the Navy Expeditionary Medal and the Association of Old Crows Outstanding Unit Award for 1986.

In November 1986, the squadron was reassigned to Carrier Air Wing 11 (CVW-11) aboard USS Enterprise. In 1987, VAQ-135 completed work-ups with CVW-11 and became the first Prowler squadron to complete the Medium Attack Advanced Readiness Program (MAARP) and the revised EA-6B Defensive Air Combat Maneuvering (DACM) syllabus.

In January 1988, VAQ-135 became the first EA-6B squadron to deploy with five Prowlers. WESTPAC ‘88 marked the return of the squadron to the Seventh Fleet with USS Enterprise, providing electronic warfare support to U.S. Naval forces operating in the North Arabian Sea. The squadron received the Armed Forces Expeditionary Medal.

In April 1988, VAQ-135 participated with CVW-11 and Battle Group Foxtrot in Operation Praying Mantis, the successful action against Iranian naval surface units. The command received the Joint Meritorious Unit Award, Meritorious Unit Commendation, and Armed Forces Expeditionary Medal. In the fall of 1988, the squadron transitioned to the ICAP-II version of the Prowler, acquiring the ability to fire the AGM-88 High-Speed Anti-Radiation Missile.

In September 1989, VAQ-135 deployed aboard Enterprise for an around the world cruise, taking part in PACEX ‘89, the largest naval exercise since World War II. In December 1989, the squadron participated in Operation Classic Resolve in defense of the Philippine government, resulting in the command receiving the Armed Forces Expeditionary Medal.

== 1990s ==
In September 1990, the squadron deployed aboard USS Abraham Lincoln. Their two-month maiden voyage took them from Naval Station Norfolk around Cape Horn to Abraham Lincoln's new homeport of NAS Alameda, California. In May 1991, they deployed to the Western Pacific aboard Abraham Lincoln and participated in Operation Fiery Vigil, the evacuation of Air Force and Navy personnel from Naval Base Subic Bay, Philippines. While on station in the Persian Gulf, the squadron took part in Operation Desert Storm, Exercise Beacon Flash with Oman and annual exercise operations with the Japanese Maritime Self-Defense Forces. In February 1992, the squadron received the 1991 AIRPAC Safety "S" award in recognition of the squadron’s outstanding safety record of over 12 years and 21,000 hours mishap free.

In late 1992, the squadron started another work-up cycle for their second deployment on Abraham Lincoln and participated in the squadron’s first AGM-88 shot over the desert skies of Naval Air Weapons Station China Lake.

On 15 June 1993, they deployed to the Western Pacific participating in Operation Southern Watch, enforcing the southern no-fly zone in Iraq where they shot two AGM-88s to protect air wing aircraft from an enemy surface to air missiles and received their second Southwest Asia Service Medal. In addition, the squadron participated in Operation Restore Hope, while USS Abraham Lincoln was stationed off the coast of Somalia, receiving the Armed Forces Expeditionary Medal. In November 1993, the squadron celebrated another safety milestone, fourteen years mishap free, just prior to returning home to NAS Whidbey Island.

In April 1995, VAQ-135 deployed to the Western pacific on board Abraham Lincoln participating in Exercise Inspired Alert with the Pakistan Air Force, Exercise Nautical Artist, an exercise with the Royal Saudi Air Force and Saudi Navy and Operation Southern Watch, receiving their third Southwest Asia Service Medal.

The squadron returned from deployment and started a 12-month turnaround aboard USS Kitty Hawk participating in RIMPAC 96'. The squadron deployed in October 1996 and again participated in Operation Southern Watch receiving their fourth Southwest Asia Service Medal. After returning from deployment in April 1997, the squadron participated in several exercises including Exercise Red Flag.

In February 1998 the squadron was re-designated Electronic Attack Squadron 135, and the aircraft’s side numbers were changed to 500 series. During the summer of 1998, the squadron deployed aboard USS Carl Vinson and participated in RIMPAC ’98.

The squadron deployed to the Western Pacific in November 1998, participating in Operation Southern Watch and Operation Desert Fox, a four-day campaign consisting of several air strikes. The squadron fired two AGM-88’s supporting air wing strike aircraft. The squadron returned from deployment in May 1999.

In September 1999, the squadron participated in exercises Red Flag and Spirit Hawk in preparation for their deployment to Incirlik Air Base, Turkey in August 2000.

== 2000s ==
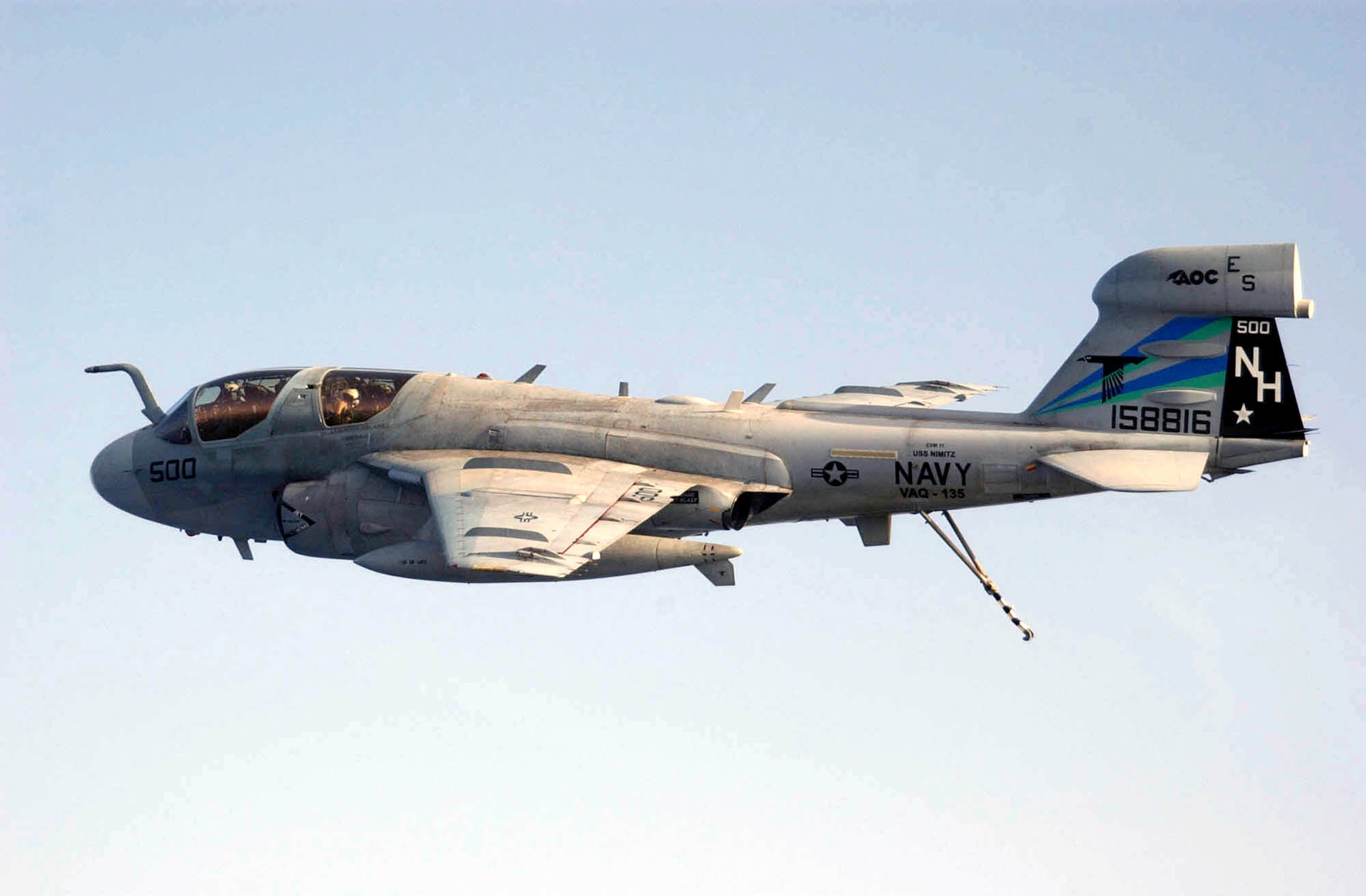
VAQ-135 EA-6B Prowler prepares to land aboard USS Nimitz after returning from a mission in support of Operation Iraqi Freedom.

From May through July 2000, the squadron flew missions in support of Operation Northern Watch on station at Incirlik Air Base while supporting in a Joint Expeditionary role for Commander Electronic Attack Wing U.S. Pacific Fleet. In March 2001, the squadron deployed to the Western Pacific in support of Operation Southern Watch. Following the September 11, 2001 attacks, USS Carl Vinson and CVW-11 took station off of the coast of Pakistan and conducted air strikes in support of coalition air and ground forces in Afghanistan during Operation Enduring Freedom. The squadron returned home in January 2002 and received the Chief of Naval Operations Safety "S" Award, Battle Efficiency Award and the Old Crows Award as the most tactically proficient Prowler squadron.

In March 2003, they deployed aboard USS Nimitz and participated in the initial air strikes of the Iraq War. Following an extended eight-month deployment, supporting two separate contingency operations, the squadron returned home in November 2003.

In July 2004, the squadron participated in Joint Expeditionary Force Experiment (JEFX) at Nellis Air Force Base, the first of five 2004 detachments in preparation for the 2005 WESTPAC deployment. The squadron completed 2004 with a two-month detachment aboard Nimitz for TSTA/Computex and received the CVW-11 Golden Wrench for maintenance excellence. In 2005, they continued their high-tempo operations in preparation for their WESTPAC deployment with detachments to NAS Fallon, NAS Lemoore, NAS North Island, and several exercises aboard USS Nimitz.

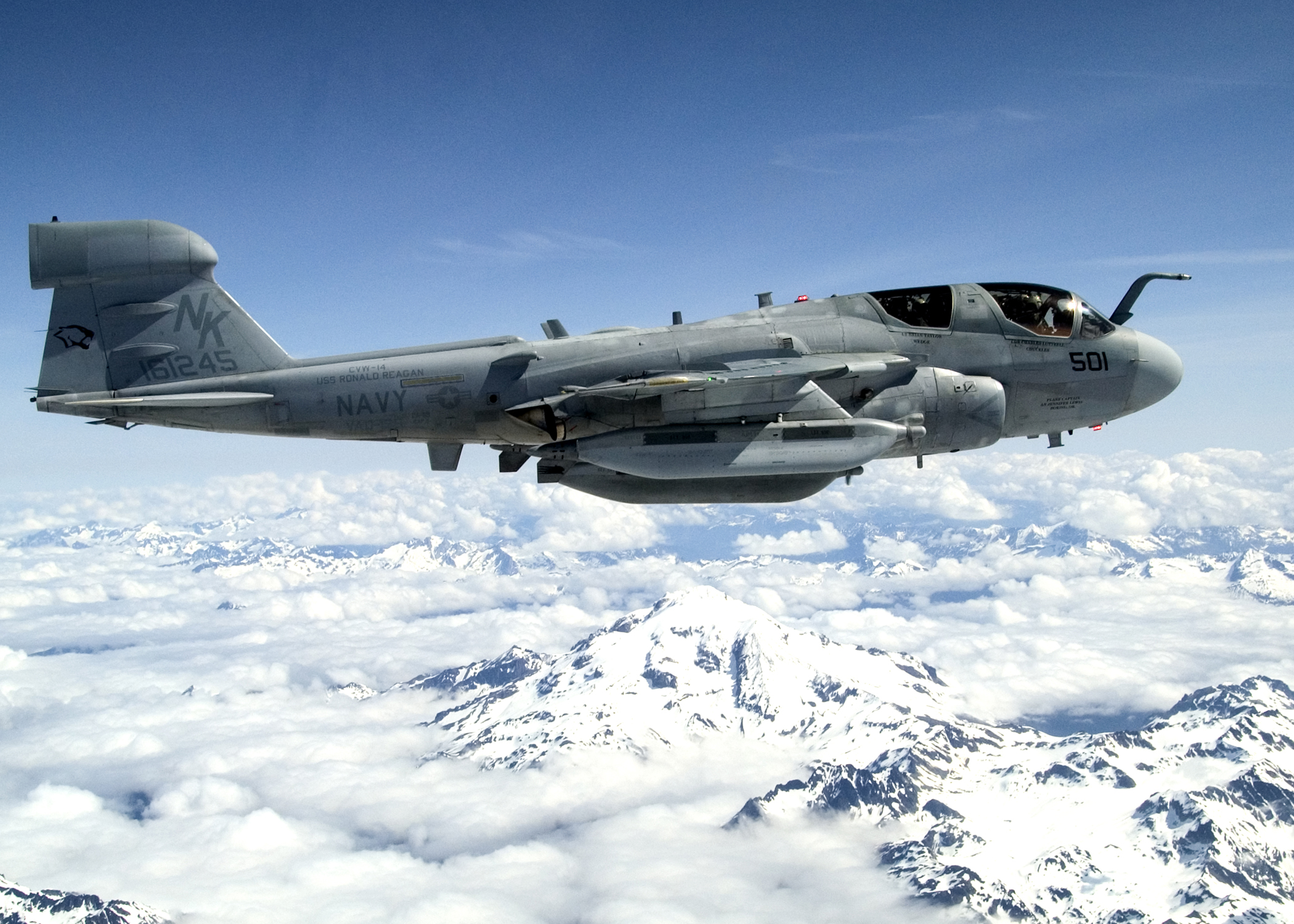
VAQ-133 EA-6B flies near Mount Baker during a training exercise

On 7 May 2005, the squadron deployed aboard USS Nimitz as part of Carrier Strike Group 11. During the 2005 deployment, VAQ-135 conducted operations in the Western Pacific and the Persian Gulf, again participating in Operation Iraqi Freedom from the Persian Gulf and Al Asad Air BaseIinraq, providing support to coalition forces in Iraq. The squadron received the CVW-11 /USS Nimitz Teamwork Award twice during the deployment, initially for the first line period and again at the end of the deployment. Additionally, VAQ-135 received the CVW-11 Golden Wrench Award for deployment, as the finest Maintenance Department in CVW-11.

On 3 March 2006 a single EA-6B Prowler aircraft from VAQ-135 with a crew of four was conducting low altitude flight training near Walla Walla Washington and crash landed north of Pendleton, Oregon. All four crew survived with minor injuries and the cause for the crash was determined to be a faulty bearing in the right engine.

The squadron departed in April 2007, for a six-month WESTPAC deployment to include supporting both Operations Enduring Freedom and Iraqi Freedom, returning in early October 2007.

The squadron returned from a subsequent Pacific deployment in June 2008 after a four-and-a-half-month deployment aboard USS Nimitz.

The squadron departed July 2009, for an eight-month WESTPAC deployment, aboard USS Nimitz, in support of Operations Enduring Freedom and Iraqi Freedom.

== 2010s ==
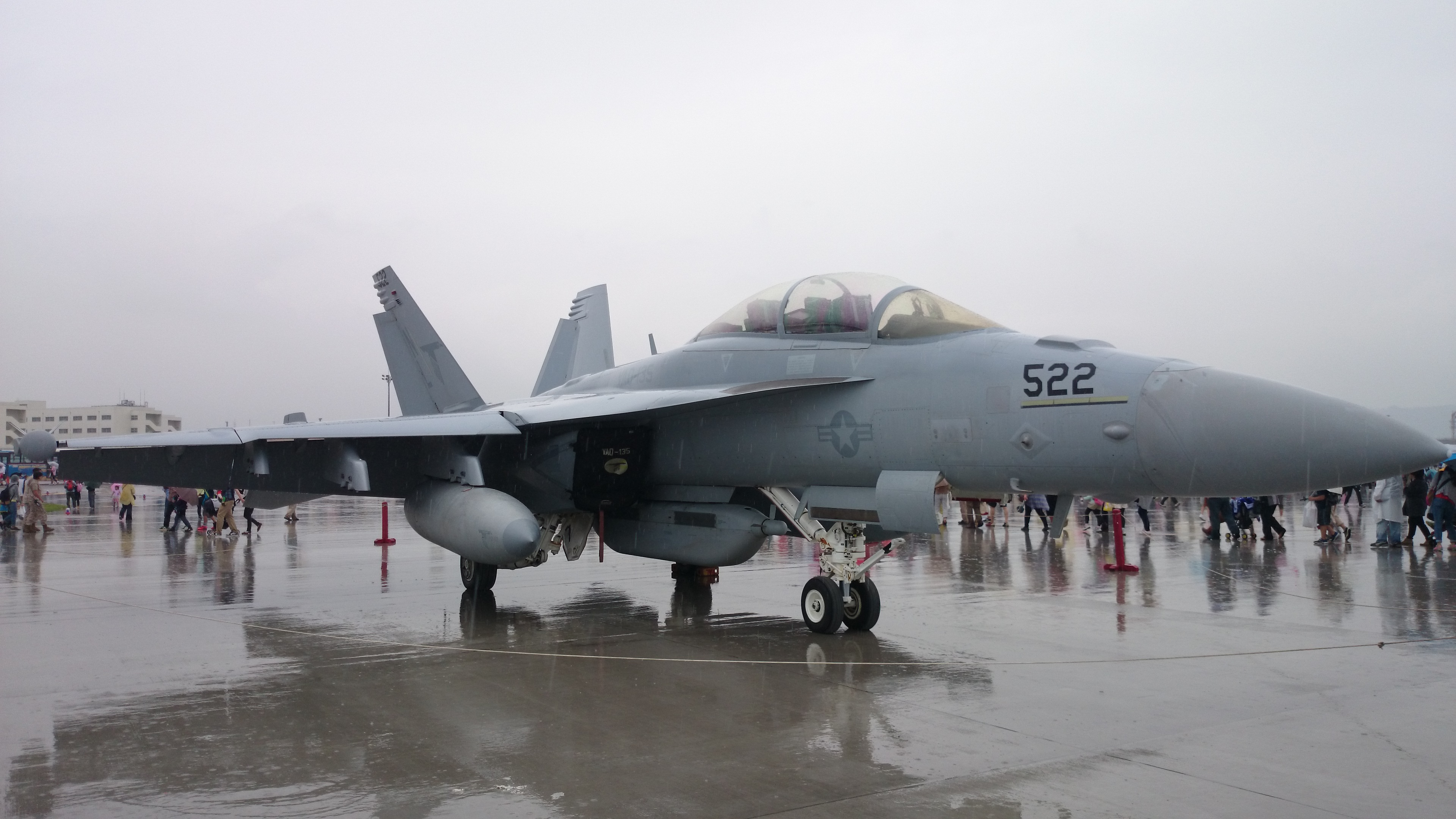
EA-18G (No.166942) of VAQ-135.

On 1 November 2010, VAQ-135 commenced transition from the EA-6B to the EA-18G Growler, achieving "safe for flight" designation in the new aircraft on 17 June 2011.

in August 2015 the squadron returned home from an expeditionary deployment to the Pacific Command area of responsibility. For six months, VAQ-135 operated primarily from Misawa Air Base, Japan, to test and refine their tactical capabilities as well as increase interoperability with U.S. and international units throughout the Pacific.

The squadron did a fly over of the St. Louis Gateway Arch, as part of the 50th anniversary of the construction of the arch on 24 October 2015

=== 2020s ===
On February 12th 2025, an EA-18G BuNo 166855, crashed into the San Diego Bay right next to Naval Air Station North Island. Both pilots ejected safely and only suffered minor injuries. The aircraft involved in the accident was the squadrons "CAG" jet.

In March 2026, VAQ-135 and their E/A-18Gs were deployed to the Middle East within Operation Epic Fury against Iran. VAQ-135 jets were noted transiting the Atlantic via Lajes Air Base.

== See also ==
- History of the United States Navy
- List of United States Navy aircraft squadrons
