= Second VA-55 (U.S. Navy) =

1983–1991 United States Navy aviation squadron

Attack Squadron 55
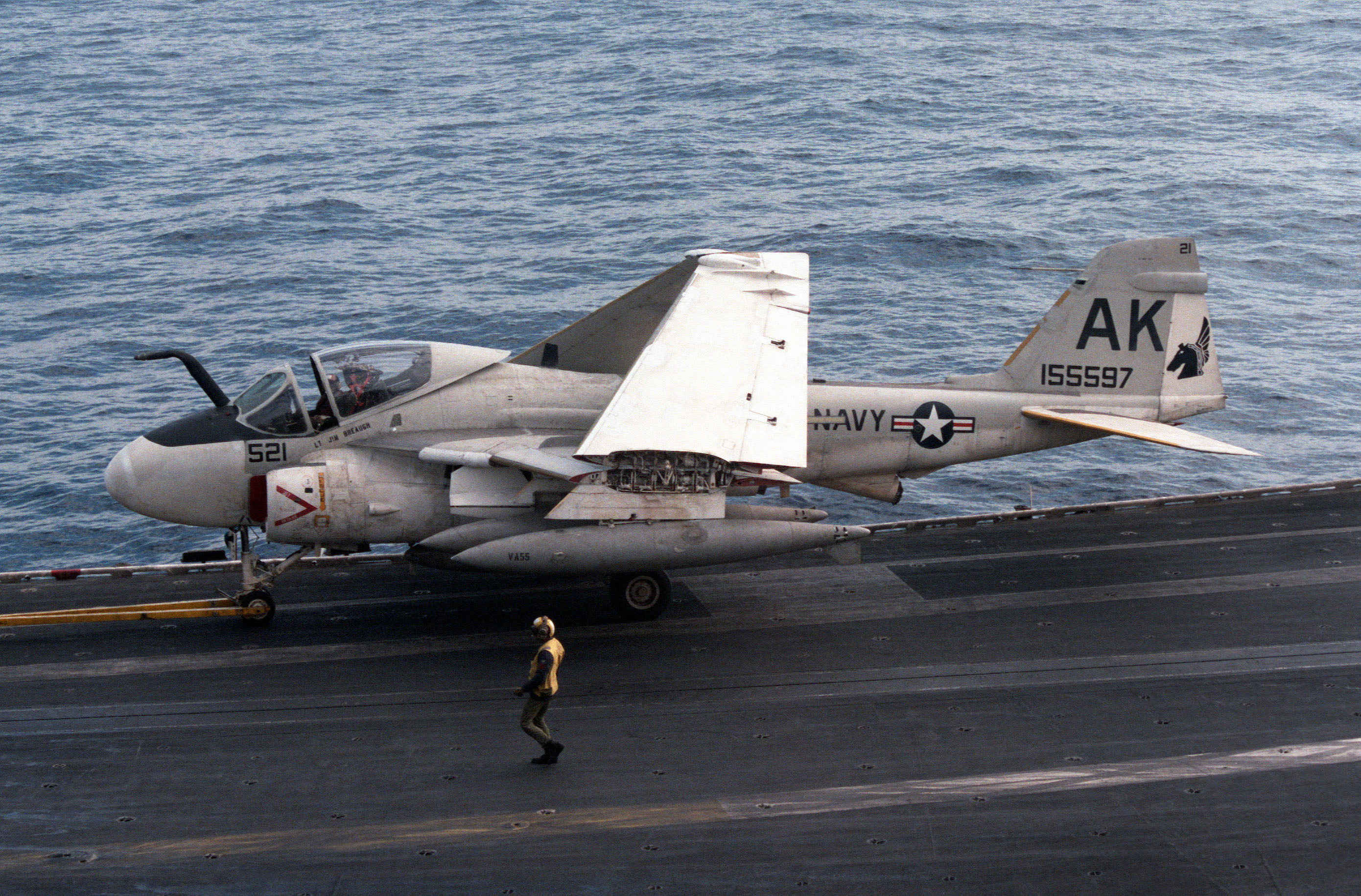
- VA-55 KA-6D tanker aircraft on USS Coral Sea in 1986.
- Active: 7 October 1983 - 1 January 1991
- Country: United States
- Branch: United States Navy
- Type: Attack
- Part of: CVW-13
- Nickname(s): Warhorses
- Engagements: Operation Prairie Fire; Operation El Dorado Canyon

Aircraft flown
- Attack: A-6E/KA-6D Intruder

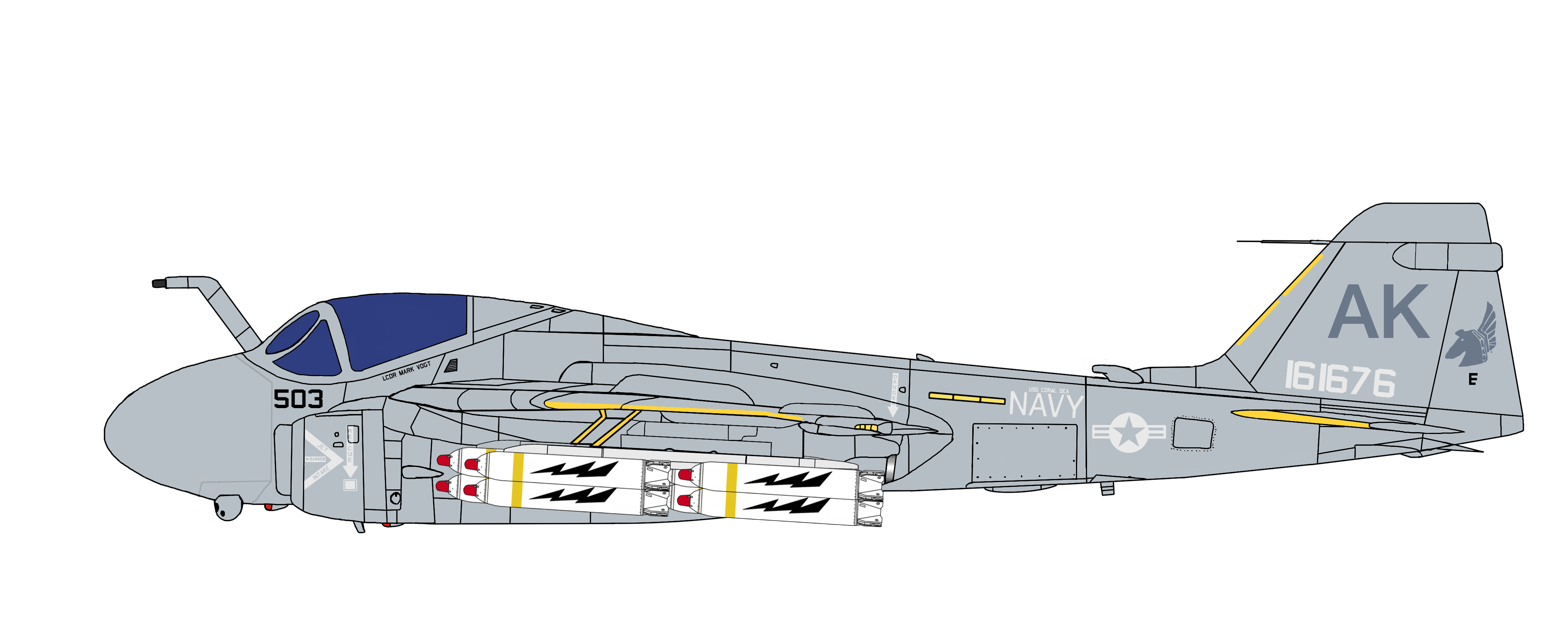
A-6E TRAM Inturder (1979) VA-55 USS Coral Sea CV-43 October 1, 1985-May 19, 1986

VA-55, nicknamed the Warhorses, was an Attack Squadron of the U.S. Navy. The squadron was established at NAS Oceana, Virginia, on 7 October 1983, and flew the A-6E and KA-6D variants of the Grumman A-6 Intruder. It was disestablished on 1 January 1991, having been based at NAS Oceana during its entire lifetime. It was the second squadron to be designated VA-55, the first VA-55 was disestablished on 12 December 1975.

== Operational history ==
- 25 March 1986: Due to the initiation of hostile fire by Libya on 24 March, a squadron aircraft attacked a Libyan Nanuchka II class guided missile patrol boat with CBU-100 Cluster Bombs. The Libyan vessel was damaged by the attack and then sunk by a Harpoon missile strike from a VA-85 A-6 operating from USS Saratoga.
- 14–15 April 1986: Six of the squadron's A-6s participated in an attack against Benina Airfield at Benghazi, Libya, during Operation El Dorado Canyon. Numerous parked aircraft were destroyed and the surrounding hangars, support facilities, aircraft aprons, and other airfield equipment and vehicles were damaged. These strikes were in response to the involvement of Libyan trained terrorists in the 1986 Berlin discotheque bombing.
- August–September 1989: USS Coral Sea, with VA-55 embarked, was ordered to operate off the coast of Lebanon following terrorist claims to have killed an American hostage, Lieutenant Colonel William R. Higgins, and the capture of Abdel Karim Obeid from Lebanon by the Israel Defense Forces. The unstable situation in Lebanon ultimately led to the evacuation of the American Embassy. Squadron aircraft flew missions in support of the evacuation.
- 22 February 1991: The squadron held a disestablishment ceremony at NAS Oceana. It was officially disestablished on 1 January 1991.

== See also ==
- VA-55 (U.S. Navy)
- History of the United States Navy
- List of inactive United States Navy aircraft squadrons
