= VA-55 (U.S. Navy) =

Attack Squadron 55
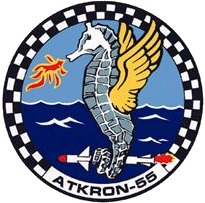
- VA-55 squadron patch
- Active: 5 February 1943 – 12 December 1975
- Country: United States
- Branch: United States Navy
- Nickname(s): Torpcats (1943-1948), Warhorses (1948-1991)
- Engagements: World War II, Korean War, Vietnam War

VA-55 was an Attack Squadron of the U.S. Navy. It was established as Torpedo Squadron VT-5 on 15 February 1943, redesignated VA-6A on 15 November 1946, and finally designated VA-55 on 16 August 1948. The squadron was disestablished on 12 December 1975. It was the first squadron to be designated VA-55, the second VA-55 was established on 7 October 1983 and disestablished on 1 January 1991.

The squadron's nickname was the Torpcats from 1943-1955, and the Warhorses from 1955 onward. Its insignia changed several times over its lifetime, ending up as a winged seahorse. They were established in 1943.

When VA-55 was stood up again in 1983, it was flying the Grumman A-6E Intruder medium-attack jet aircraft.

== Operational history ==
=== World War II ===
- 15 February 1943: VGS-30 was disestablished and personnel from the squadron were used to form VT-5 and VF-1.
- 6–24 July 1943: The squadron departed Norfolk, Virginia embarked on USS Yorktown en route to the Hawaiian Islands via the Panama Canal.
- 31 August 1943: Embarked on Yorktown, the squadron participated in a raid on Marcus Island.
- 5–6 October 1943: The squadron participated in a raid on Wake Island.
- November–December 1943: The squadron supported the Battle of Makin and the Battle of Tarawa, and flew strikes against Kwajalein in the Marshall Islands.
- January–February 1944: The squadron provided air support for the Gilbert and Marshall Islands campaign.
- 16–17 February 1944: Squadron aircraft flew strikes against the Japanese stronghold of Truk.
- 22 February 1944: The squadron participated in a raid on the Marianas, striking targets on Saipan.
- 30 March–1 April 1944: Squadron aircraft struck ships and facilities at Palau in the Caroline Islands. The strike on 30 March was the first time the squadron's TBFs were armed with torpedoes in combat. On 30 March, two VT-5 aircraft mistook the U.S. Navy submarine USS Tunny (SS-282) for a Japanese destroyer and dropped two 2,000-pound (907 kg) bombs, one of which landed 10 yards (9 m) from Tunny. Tunny suffered minor damage.
- 21–23 April 1944: Strikes were flown against targets on Wake Island and Hollandia in New Guinea. These operations were in support of the landings at Hollandia by General Douglas MacArthur’s forces.
- 29–30 April 1944: The squadron participated in another strike operation against Truk.
- 30 April 1944: The squadron's commanding officer, Lieutenant Commander Dick Upson, failed to return from a search and rescue mission to locate a downed pilot.
- 14 May 1944: Following a ten-month combat tour beginning in August 1943, Air Group 5 was relieved aboard Yorktown by Air Group 1 and returned to CONUS to reform on 25 June 1944.
- 7 February 1945: Embarked on USS Franklin, the squadron departed NAS Alameda for Hawaii, arriving there on 13 February. This was the beginning of the squadron's second major combat tour in the Pacific.
- 19 March 1945: VT-5 was preparing to launch its aircraft for an attack against the harbor of Kobe, Japan, when Franklin was hit by two enemy bombs from a Japanese aircraft. Fires were ignited on the second and third decks from the first bomb and the second triggered munitions on the carrier. All VT-5's aircraft on the flight and hangar deck were destroyed by the ensuing explosions and fire. The damage was one of the most extensive experienced by an Essex-class aircraft carrier during World War II. A total of 724 men were killed and 265 wounded. VT-5's commanding officer, Lieutenant Commander Allan C. Edmands, was lost in the action. All surviving VT-5 personnel were transferred from Franklin and returned to CONUS.

=== Korean War ===
- 3 July 1950: Participated in the first combat strikes by carrier aircraft against the North Koreans. The squadron flew its AD-4 Skyraiders on strikes against airfields, supply lines and transportation facilities in and around Pyongyang, North Korea. This was also the first use of the AD Skyraider in combat.
- 12 September 1950: Pre-invasion strikes against targets in and around Inchon and Seoul, Korea, began in preparation for the Battle of Inchon.
- 15 September 1950: Strikes were flown to support the landings at Inchon.
- 16 May 1951: All VA-55 personnel, except 16 officers and 5 enlisted men, embarked on USS General William Weigel en route to Japan for duty with Air Group 19 aboard USS Princeton. The remainder of the personnel were airlifted to Japan on 17 May.
- 29 May 1951: VA-55 embarked on Princeton, replaced VA-195 in Air Group 19, and proceeded to Korea for combat operations.

=== 1950s ===
- March 1954: The squadron was deployed to the Western Pacific aboard USS Essex when the carrier was ordered to operate off the coast of Vietnam during the Viet Minh’s assault against the French at Dien Bien Phu.
- July–September 1957: Operated intermittently off the coast of Taiwan due to the build-up of Chinese Communist forces and the threat of a possible invasion of Taiwan or its off-shore islands.
- September 1958: Operated in the Formosa Straits during the Second Taiwan Strait Crisis.

=== Vietnam War ===
- 30–31 October 1962: Participated in cross deck operations on HMS Victorious in the South China Sea.
- April 1963: USS Ticonderoga, with VA-55 embarked, deployed to the South China Sea following several defeats of neutralist forces by the Communists in Laos. After a ceasefire agreement was arranged, the ship resumed normal Seventh Fleet operations on 5 May.

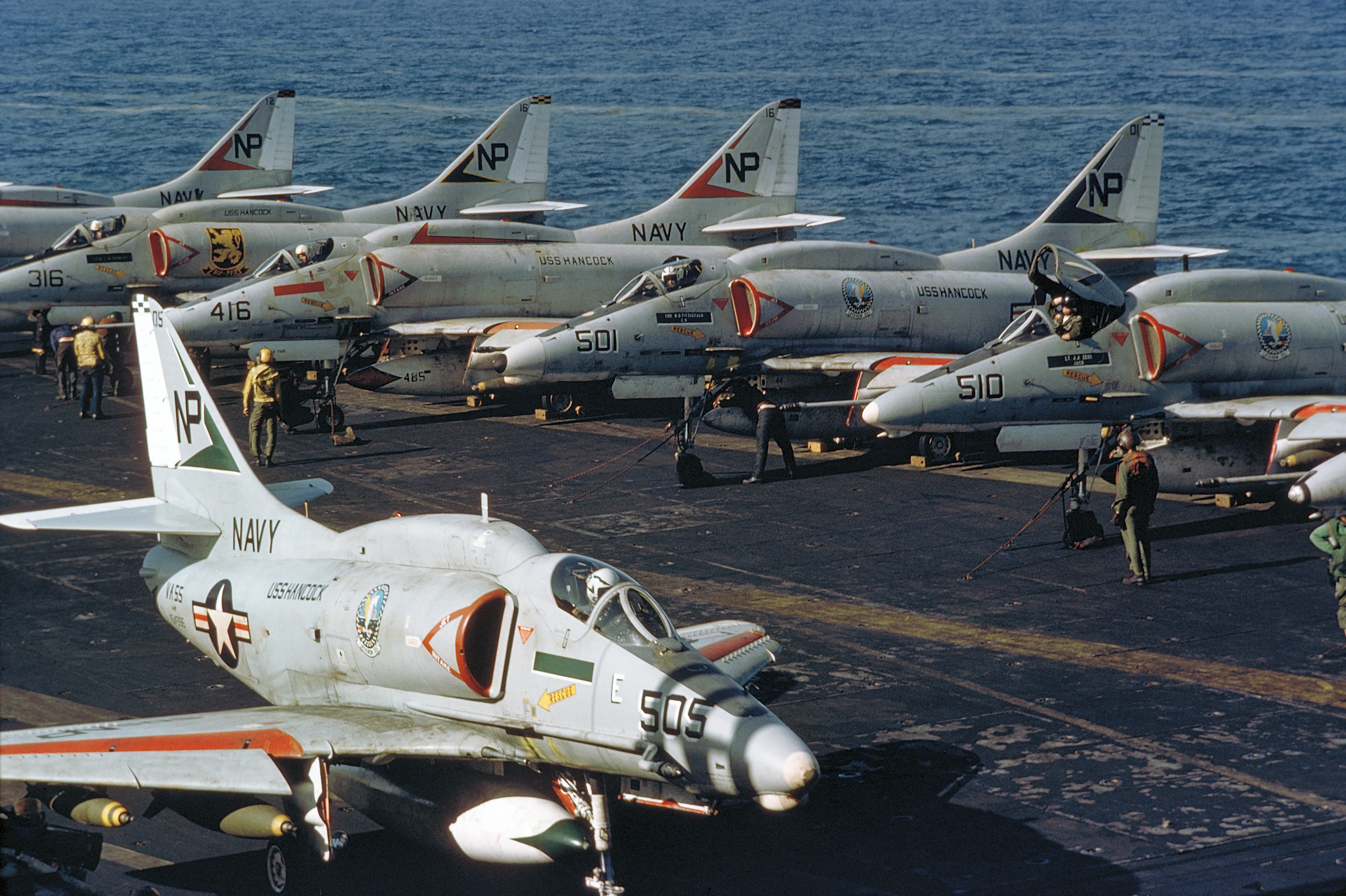
A VA-55 A-4F, ready for a mission over Vietnam in 1972. It is armed with Mk 82 (500 lb/227 kg) and Mk 83 (1000 lb/454 kg) bombs.

- July–September 1964: Participated in special Yankee Team operations involving missions over Laos and South Vietnam.
- 2 and 4 August 1964: The squadron flew air support for USS Maddox and USS Turner Joy while the destroyers were on Desoto Patrol missions (intelligence collection missions begun in 1962) off the coast of North Vietnam.
- 5 August 1964: VA-55's A-4s participated in Operation Pierce Arrow, retaliatory strikes against the North Vietnamese. Along with other aircraft from CVG-5, they were part of the mission that struck the Vinh oil storage facility. Ninety percent of the complex was destroyed.
- October–November 1964: The squadron continued to operate from Ticonderoga off the coast of South Vietnam and participated in special Yankee Team operations, flying missions over South Vietnam.
- 3 June 1966: The squadron's commanding officer, Commander M. J. Chewning, while on a mission over North Vietnam, lost the use of his left arm due to a shrapnel hit. He continued his mission, striking a road target, and then returned to the carrier, making a onehanded carrier landing. For his exploits he was awarded the Silver Star and the Purple Heart.
- 15 June 1966: Lieutenant Commander Theodore F. Kopfman was awarded the Silver Star, in absentia, for his actions on a mission over North Vietnam. During the sortie his aircraft was shot down and he was taken prisoner. He was released by North Vietnam and returned to the United States in 1973.
- April 1972: The squadron participated in Operation Freedom Train, tactical air sorties against military and logistic targets in the southern part of North Vietnam. It also provided close air support for forces in South Vietnam following a massive invasion by North Vietnam.
- May 1972: Participated in the early phase of Operation Linebacker, heavy air strikes against targets in North Vietnam.
- June 1973: Missions were flown in support of Operation End Sweep, the clearing of mines in the territorial waters of North Vietnam.
- Oct 1973: With the outbreak of the Yom Kippur War, the USS Hancock, with VA-55 embarked, was directed to leave Yankee Station and operate in the Arabian Sea and Gulf of Aden.

== Home port assignments ==
The squadron was assigned to these home ports, effective on the dates shown:

- NAS Norfolk (NAAF Pungo) – 15 February 1943
- Hawaii – July 1943*
- NAS Alameda – May 1944
- NAAS Monterey – August 1944†
- NAAS Santa Rosa – October 1944†
- Hawaii – February 1945‡
- NAS Seattle – April 1945§
- NAS Klamath Falls – 8 May 1945
- NAS Pasco – 2 September 1945
- NAAS Brown Field, Chula Vista – 4 December 1945
- NAS Barbers Point – 25 March 1946
- NAS San Diego – 21 May 1946
- NAS Miramar – 20 March 1952
- NAS Lemoore – January 1962

== Aircraft assignment ==
The squadron first received the following aircraft on the dates shown:

- TBF-1 Avenger – 1 March 1943
- TBF-1C Avenger – October 1943
- TBM-3 Avenger – September 1944
- TBM-3E Avenger – June 1945
- TBM-3Q Avenger – October 1946
- TBM-3J Avenger – March 1947
- AD-1 Skyraider – 18 June 1949
- AD-4 Skyraider – 3 October 1949
- AD-6 Skyraider – July 1954
- AD-7 Skyraider – December 1956
- FJ-4B Fury – November 1957
- A4D-2 Skyhawk – March 1959
- A4D-2N/A-4C Skyhawk – January 1962
- A-4E Skyhawk – July 1963
- A-4C Skyhawk – 12 September 1966
- A-4F Skyhawk – 29 December 1967

== See also ==
- Attack aircraft
- History of the United States Navy
- List of inactive United States Navy aircraft squadrons
