= VFA-132 =

Strike Fighter Squadron 132
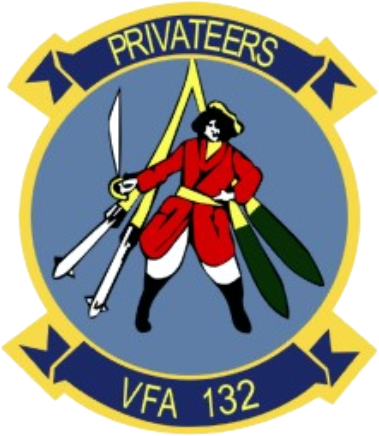
- VFA-132 Insignia
- Active: 2 January 1984 – 1 June 1992
- Country: United States
- Branch: United States Navy
- Type: Fighter / Attack
- Role: Close air support Air interdiction Aerial reconnaissance
- Part of: CVW-6
- Garrison/HQ: NAS Cecil Field
- Nickname(s): Privateers
- Equipment: F/A-18 Hornet
- Engagements: Operation Prairie Fire; Operation El Dorado Canyon; Operation Provide Comfort

Strike Fighter Squadron 132 (VFA-132), also known as the "Privateers", was an aviation unit of the United States Navy that was based at Naval Air Station Cecil Field, Florida (US), in service from 1984 to 1992. Their radio callsign was "Pirate."

== History ==
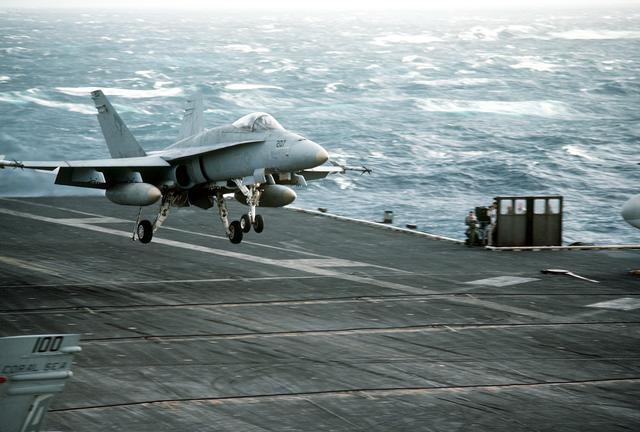
An F/A-18A Hornet from VFA-132 landing in rough seas in the mid 80s

VFA-132 was established on 3 January 1984 as the first squadron to be assigned the VFA designation and as a unit of the newly established Carrier Air Wing 13 (CVW-13). VFA-132 operated the F/A-18A Hornet from NAS Lemoore, California, and moved to NAS Cecil Field in February 1985. They made their inaugural deployment aboard the USS Coral Sea (CV-43) and saw combat operations during Operations Prairie Fire and El Dorado Canyon against Libya.

In March 1986, during Freedom of Navigation exercises in the Gulf of Sidra, the squadron's aircraft flew combat air patrols in support of the exercise, including the period of 24 and 25 March following a 24 March Libyan firing of an SA-5 missile against a U.S. aircraft operating in international waters. On 14–15 April 1986, in response for the Libyan-sponsored terrorist bombing of U.S. personnel in Berlin, Germany, the U.S. European Command launched Operation El Dorado Canyon. VFA-132 aircraft, along with other units of Carrier Air Wing Thirteen (CVW-13) and A-7E Corsairs from CVW-1, provided air-to-surface AGM-45 Shrike and AGM-88 HARM missile strikes against Libyan surface-to-air missile sites at Benghazi. This was the first use of the F/A-18 in combat.

From October 1987 through April 1988 (6 months) the squadron deployed to MCAS Iwakuni, Japan, and was assigned to Marine Air Group 15. While deployed to Japan, the squadron operated detachments at NAS Cubi Point, Tsuiki AB, Clark AB, Yechon AB, Misawa AB and Kadena AB. They also participated in exercises in Japan, the Philippines, and Korea.

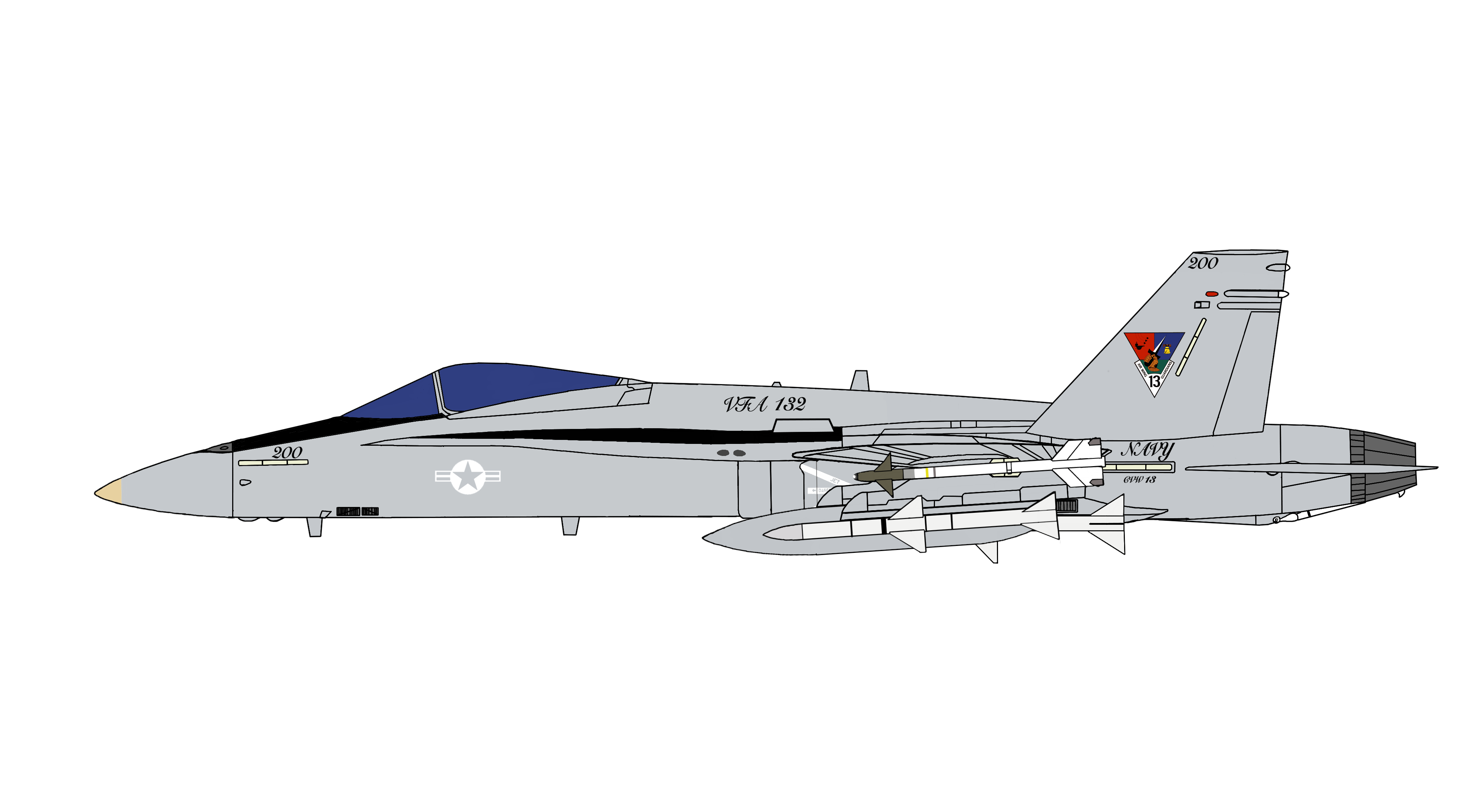
F/A-18A Hornet AK-200, the C.A.G. aircraft of VFA-132 in 1990 when CVW-13 was disestablished.

During August–September 1989, Coral Sea, with VFA-132 embarked, operated off the coast of Lebanon following the Israeli capture of Sheik Obeid and the reported killing of Lieutenant Colonel William R. Higgins, USMC. In early September the squadron provided air cover for the CH-53 Sea Stallion helicopters used to evacuate personnel from the U.S. embassy in Beirut. After Coral Sea and CVW-13 were decommissioned, VFA-132 was reassigned to CVW-6 aboard USS Forrestal (CV-59).

During May 1991, CVW-6 squadrons participated in Operation Provide Comfort, flying missions over northern Iraq in support of the Kurdish relief effort.

The squadron was decommissioned on 1 June 1992.

== See also ==
- History of the United States Navy
- List of inactive United States Navy aircraft squadrons
- List of United States Navy aircraft squadrons
