= VAW-127 =

Carrier Airborne Early Warning Squadron 127
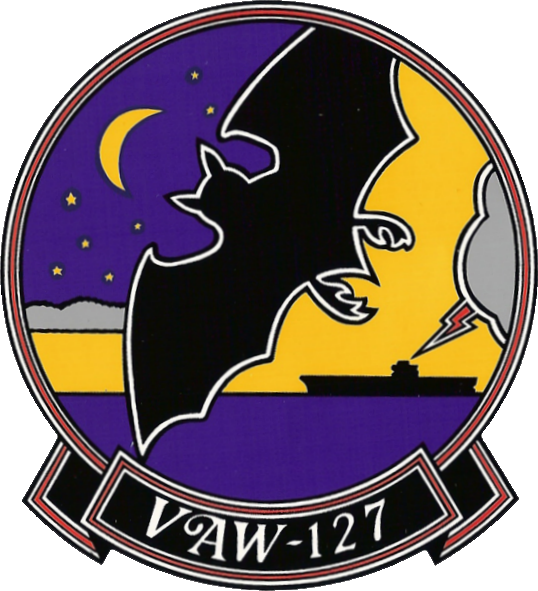
- VAW-127 Insignia
- Active: 2 September 1983 – 30 September 1991
- Country: United States
- Branch: United States Navy
- Type: Carrier Airborne Early Warning
- Part of: Carrier Air Wing 13
- Nickname(s): "Seabats"
- Engagements: Operation Eldorado Canyon, Gulf of Sidra

Carrier Airborne Early Warning Squadron 127 (VAW-127), nicknamed the "Seabats", was an aviation unit of the United States Navy in service from 1983 to 1991. The squadron was equipped with the Grumman E-2C Hawkeye and was assigned only to Carrier Air Wing 13 (CVW-13) on the aircraft carrier USS Coral Sea (CV-43).

== Squadron History ==
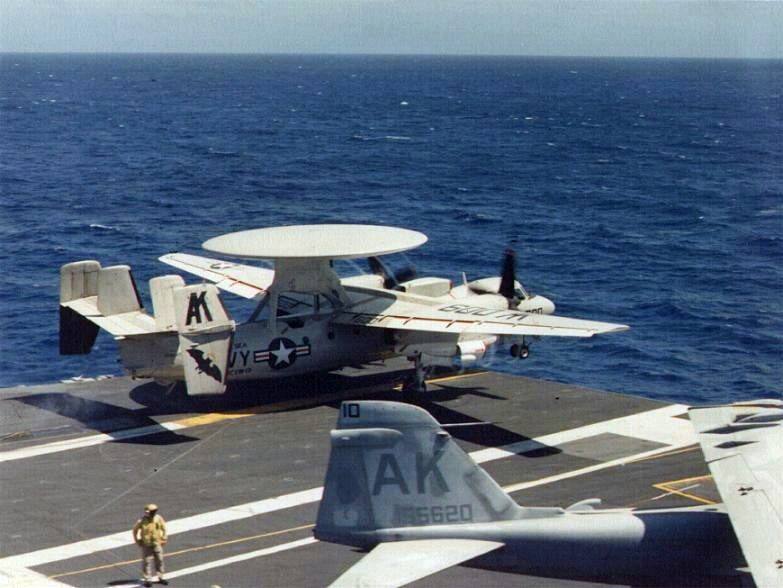
An VAW-127 E-2C is launched from the USS Coral Sea, 1989.

The Seabats were established on 2 September 1983 as part of the Reagan-era build-up to a 600-ship Navy (to include as many as 15 aircraft carrier battle groups (CVBG). VAW-127 sailed with CVW-13 and USS Coral Sea until the end of the Cold War and subsequent drawdown of the Services which lead to the Coral Sea/CVW-13 team being one of the first units to be decommissioned. VAW-127 was soon decommissioned on 30 September 1991. In between, the Seabats participated in several noteworthy events to include Operation Eldorado Canyon, the strike conducted against Libya on 15 April 1986 and operations in the Gulf of Sidra. VAW-127 was the recipient of the Naval Air Force Atlantic (AIRLANT) Battle Efficiency (Battle "E") award for 1989.

== See also ==
- History of the United States Navy
- List of inactive United States Navy aircraft squadrons
- List of United States Navy aircraft squadrons
