= USS Princeton (CV-37) =

Essex-class aircraft carrier of the US Navy

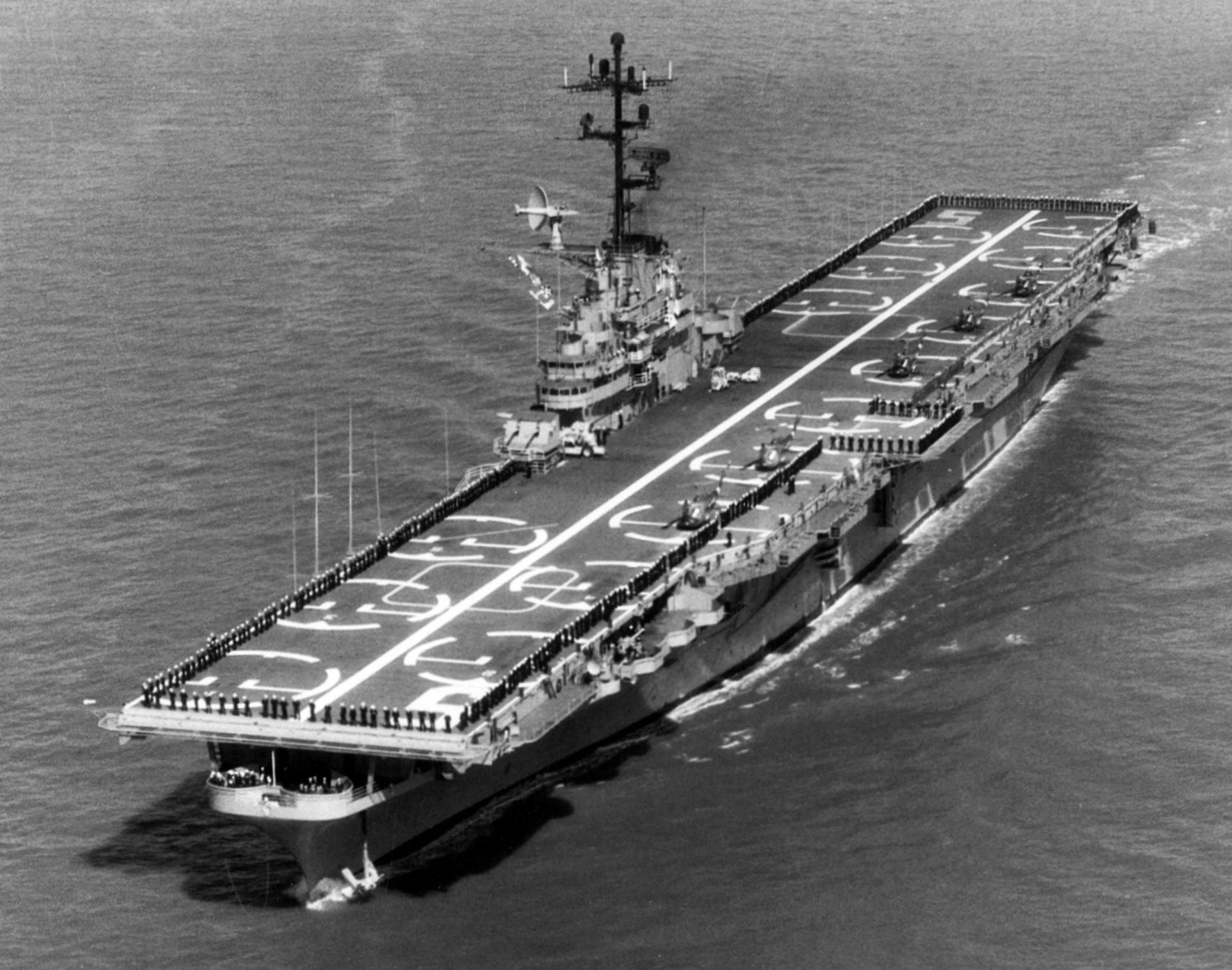
- USS Princeton underway in 1965

History

United States
- Name: Princeton
- Namesake: Battle of Princeton
- Builder: Philadelphia Naval Shipyard
- Laid down: 14 September 1943
- Launched: 8 July 1945
- Commissioned: 18 November 1945
- Decommissioned: 21 June 1949
- Recommissioned: 28 August 1950
- Decommissioned: 30 January 1970
- Reclassified: CVA-37, 1 October 1952; CVS-37, 1 January 1954; LPH-5, 2 March 1959
- Stricken: 30 January 1970
- Fate: Scrapped, September 1972
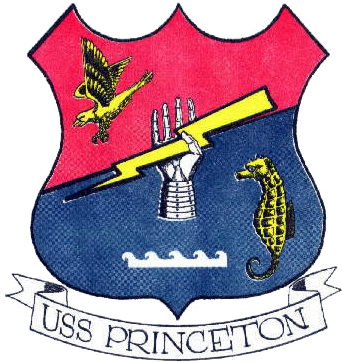
- Badge

General characteristics
- Class & type: Essex-class aircraft carrier
- Displacement: 27,100 long tons (27,500 t) standard
- Length: 888 feet (271 m) overall
- Beam: 93 feet (28 m)
- Draft: 28 feet 7 inches (8.71 m)
- Installed power: 8 × boilers; 150,000 shp (110 MW)
- Propulsion: 4 × geared steam turbines; 4 × shafts
- Speed: 33 knots (61 km/h; 38 mph)
- Complement: 3448 officers and enlisted
- Armament: 12 × 5 inch (127 mm)/38 caliber guns; 32 × Bofors 40 mm guns; 46 × Oerlikon 20 mm cannons
- Armor: Belt: 4 in (102 mm); Hangar deck: 2.5 in (64 mm); Deck: 1.5 in (38 mm); Conning tower: 1.5 inch
- Aircraft carried: 90–100 aircraft

USS Princeton (CV/CVA/CVS-37, LPH-5) was one of 24 Essex-class aircraft carriers built during and shortly after World War II for the United States Navy. The ship was the fifth US Navy ship to bear the name, and was named for the Revolutionary War Battle of Princeton. Princeton was commissioned in November 1945, too late to serve in World War II, but saw extensive service in the Korean War, in which she earned eight battle stars, and the Vietnam War. She was reclassified in the early 1950s as an attack carrier (CVA), then as an Antisubmarine Aircraft Carrier (CVS), and finally as an amphibious assault ship (LPH), carrying helicopters and marines. One of her last missions was to serve as the prime recovery ship for the Apollo 10 space mission.

Although she was extensively modified internally as part of her conversion to an LPH, external modifications were minor, so throughout her career Princeton retained the classic appearance of a World War II Essex-class ship. She was decommissioned in 1970, and sold for scrap in September 1972.

== Service history ==
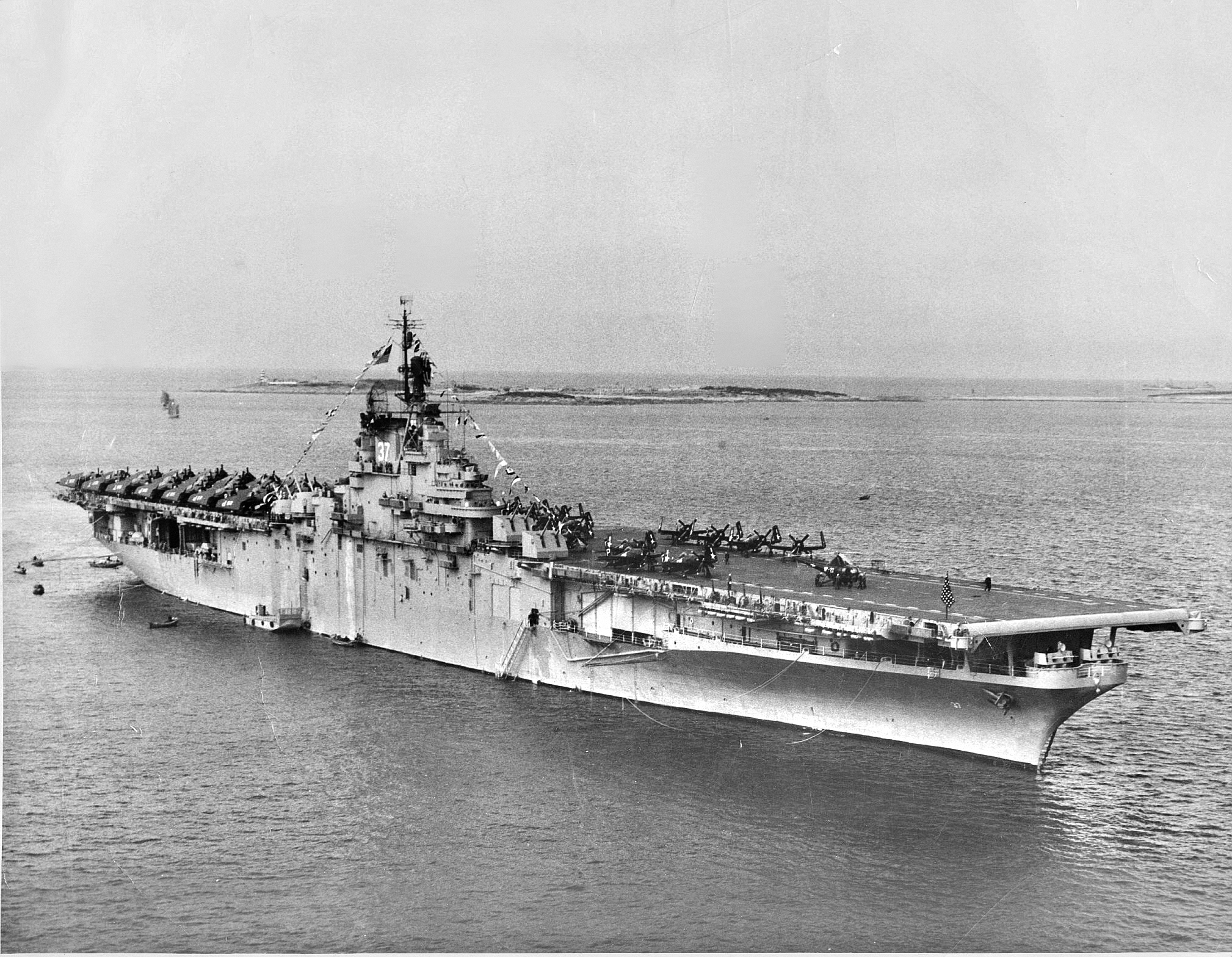
Princeton off Qingdao, China, in 1948.

The ship was laid down as Valley Forge – one of the "long-hull" Essex class – on 14 September 1943 at the Philadelphia Navy Yard. She was renamed Princeton on 21 November 1944 to commemorate the light carrier USS Princeton (CVL-23), which was lost at the Battle of Leyte Gulf on 24 October 1944. The new Princeton was launched on 8 July 1945, sponsored by Mrs. Harold Dodds, and commissioned on 18 November 1945, Captain John M. Hoskins in command.

Following shakedown off Cuba, Princeton — with Air Group 81 embarked – remained in the Atlantic and operated with the 8th Fleet until June 1946.

Then transferred to the Pacific Fleet, she arrived at San Diego, departing again on 3 July 1946 to carry the body of Philippine President Manuel L. Quezon back to Manila for burial. From Manila, Princeton joined the 7th Fleet in the Marianas, becoming flagship of Task Force 77 (TF 77). In September and October 1946, she operated in Japanese and Chinese waters, then returned to the Mariana Islands where she remained until February 1947. In 1947 she had Carrier Air Group 13 on board, and in October 1948 evacuated dependents from Qingdao, returned to San Diego Dec 1948 and unloaded CAG 13. Maneuvers in Hawaiian waters preceded her return to San Diego until 15 March. She cruised the West Coast, Hawaiian waters, and the Western Pacific (1 October – 23 December) in 1948. She then prepared for inactivation, and on 20 June decommissioned and joined other capital ships in the Pacific Reserve Fleet.

=== Korean War ===
Reactivated with the outbreak of hostilities in Korea 15 months later, Princeton recommissioned on 28 August 1950. Intensive training refreshed her Reservist crew. On 5 December she joined TF 77 off the Korean coast, her planes and pilots (Air Group 19) making possible the reinstitution of jet combat air patrols over the battle zone. She launched 248 sorties against targets in the Hagaru area to announce her arrival. For the next six days she continued the pace, supporting Marines retreating from the Chosin Reservoir to Hungnam. By the 11th, all units had reached the staging area on the coast. Princeton's planes, with other Navy, Marine, and Air Force squadrons, then covered the evacuation from Hungnam through its completion on the 24th.

Interdiction missions followed, and by 4 April Princeton's planes had rendered 54 rail and 37 highway bridges inoperable and damaged 44 more. In May, they flew against the railroad bridges connecting Pyongyang with Sunchon, Sinanju, Kachon, and the trans-peninsula line. Next, they combined close air support with raids on power sources in the Hwachon Reservoir area and, with the stabilization of the front there, resumed interdiction. For much of the summer they pounded supply arteries, concentrating on highways. Princeton then returned to the US, arriving at San Diego on 29 August.

During 1952, scenes for the movie Flat Top were filmed aboard the ship, as acknowledged in the movie.

On 30 April 1952, Princeton rejoined TF 77 in the combat zone. For 138 days, her planes flew against the enemy. They sank small craft to prevent the recapture of offshore islands; blasted concentrations of supplies, facilities, and equipment behind enemy lines, participated in air-gun strikes on coastal cities, pounded the enemy's hydroelectric complex at Suiho on the Yalu River to turn off power on both sides of that river, destroyed gun positions and supply areas in Pyongyang; and closed mineral processing plants and munitions factories at Sindok, Musan, Aoji, and Najin.

Reclassified CVA-37 (1 October 1952), Princeton returned to California on 3 November for a two-month respite from the western Pacific. In February 1953, she was back off the Korean coast and until the end of the conflict launched planes for close air support, for "Cherokee" strikes against supply, artillery, and troop concentrations in enemy territory, and against road traffic. She remained in the area after the truce on 27 July, and on 7 September got underway for San Diego.

=== 1954–1962 ===
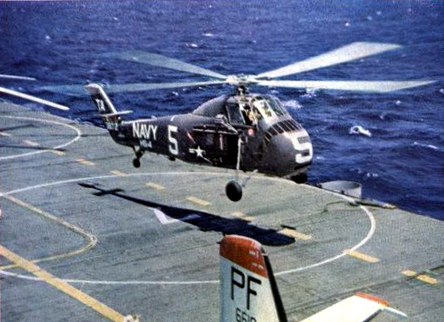
HSS-1 Seabat onboard Princeton in 1959

In January 1954, Princeton was reclassified CVS-37 and, after conversion at Bremerton, Washington, took up antisubmarine/ Hunter-Killer (HUK) training operations in the eastern Pacific. For the next five years she alternated HUK exercises off the West Coast with similar operations in the western Pacific and, in late 1957-early 1958, in the Indian Ocean–Persian Gulf area.

Reclassified again, 2 March 1959, she emerged from conversion as an amphibious assault carrier, LPH-5. Capable of transporting a battalion landing team and carrying helicopters in place of planes, Princeton's mission became that of vertical envelopment—the landing of Marines behind enemy beach fortifications and providing logistics and medical support as they attack from the rear to seize critical points, cut enemy supplies, sever communications, and link up with assault forces landed on the beaches. Since this was a Marine Corps mission, Marines made up a major portion of the ship's company in the Air, Operations, and Supply Departments.

From May 1959 – January 1960, Princeton trained with Marine units from Camp Pendleton, then deployed to WestPac to train in Okinawan waters.

For the next three years, she followed a similar schedule, gaining experience in her primary mission. Interruptions came in October 1961 when she rescued 74 survivors of two merchantmen Pioneer Muse and Sheik grounded on Kita Daito Shima and in April 1962 when she delivered Marine Corps advisors and helicopters to Sóc Trăng in the Mekong Delta area of the Republic of Vietnam (South Vietnam). From September–November 1962, Princeton served as flagship of Joint Task Force 8 during the nuclear weapons test series, Operation Dominic.

=== Vietnam War ===
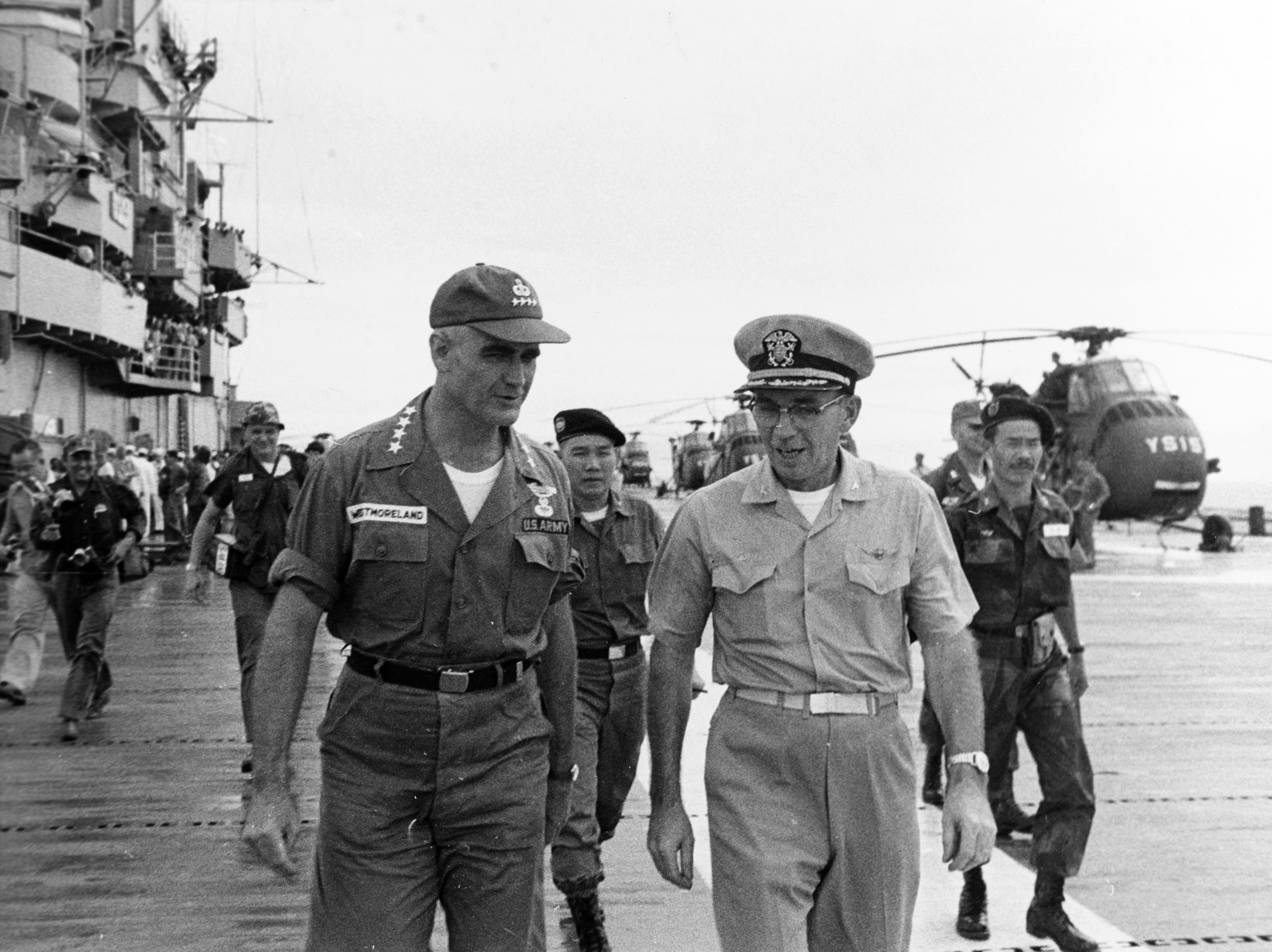
General William Westmoreland, Commander of Military Assistance Command, Vietnam, with Captain Paul J. Knapp (USN) and a pair of ARVN generals, aboard Princeton, November 1964.

In October 1964, Princeton exchanged WestPac training for the real thing as she returned to Vietnam and joined the Pacific Fleet's Ready Group in operations against North Vietnamese and Viet Cong (VC) forces. Combat operations, interrupted in November for flood relief work, continued into the new year, 1965, and culminated in May off Chu Lai as she carried out her primary mission, vertical envelopment, for the first time in combat.

Returning to her homeport, Long Beach, California, Princeton visited San Francisco, Puget Sound, and Hawaii as part of the 1965 Pacific Midshipman Training Squadron. She then transported Marine Aircraft Group 36 to Vietnam in August, and in February 1966 got underway for another tour in the combat zone. Relieving Okinawa as flagship for the Amphibious Ready Group, she engaged the enemy in operations Jackstay, 26 March – 6 April, to clear the Rung Sat Special Zone of Viet Cong guerrillas, and Osage, 27 April – 4 May, to protect Vietnamese in the Phu Loc area from VC harassment. Search and destroy missions against Viet Cong and People's Army of Vietnam units followed as Princeton provided transportation, medical evacuation, logistics and communication support for the amphibious operation Deckhouse I, 18 – 27 June, in the Song Cau district and the Song Cai river valley, then supported 1st Cavalry and 101st Airborne units engaged in Operation Nathan Hale to the south of the Deckhouse I area. Operation Deckhouse II and support for Operation Hastings followed as Navy, Marine, and Army units again combined, this time to impede enemy infiltration from the DMZ.

After Operation Hastings, Princeton sailed for home, arriving on 2 September. She deployed again to Vietnam from 30 January – 19 June 1967, and again ranged along the coast. In March, she assisted in countering an enemy threat to the Marine artillery base at Gio Linh and evacuated wounded from Con Thien. In April, she participated in Operation Beacon Star, in the Khe Sanh area, and supported search and destroy operations in conjunction with Operation Shawnee. In May, her helicopters lifted Marines to the DMZ to block enemy forces withdrawing across the Bến Hải River.

A much-needed overhaul followed Princeton's return to the west coast, and in May 1968 she again sailed west to Vietnam. There, as flagship for Amphibious Ready Group Alpha, she provided amphibious assault carrier services for operations Fortress Attack III and IV, Proud Hunter, Swift Pursuit, and Eager Hunter. In December, she returned to the United States.

=== Later career ===
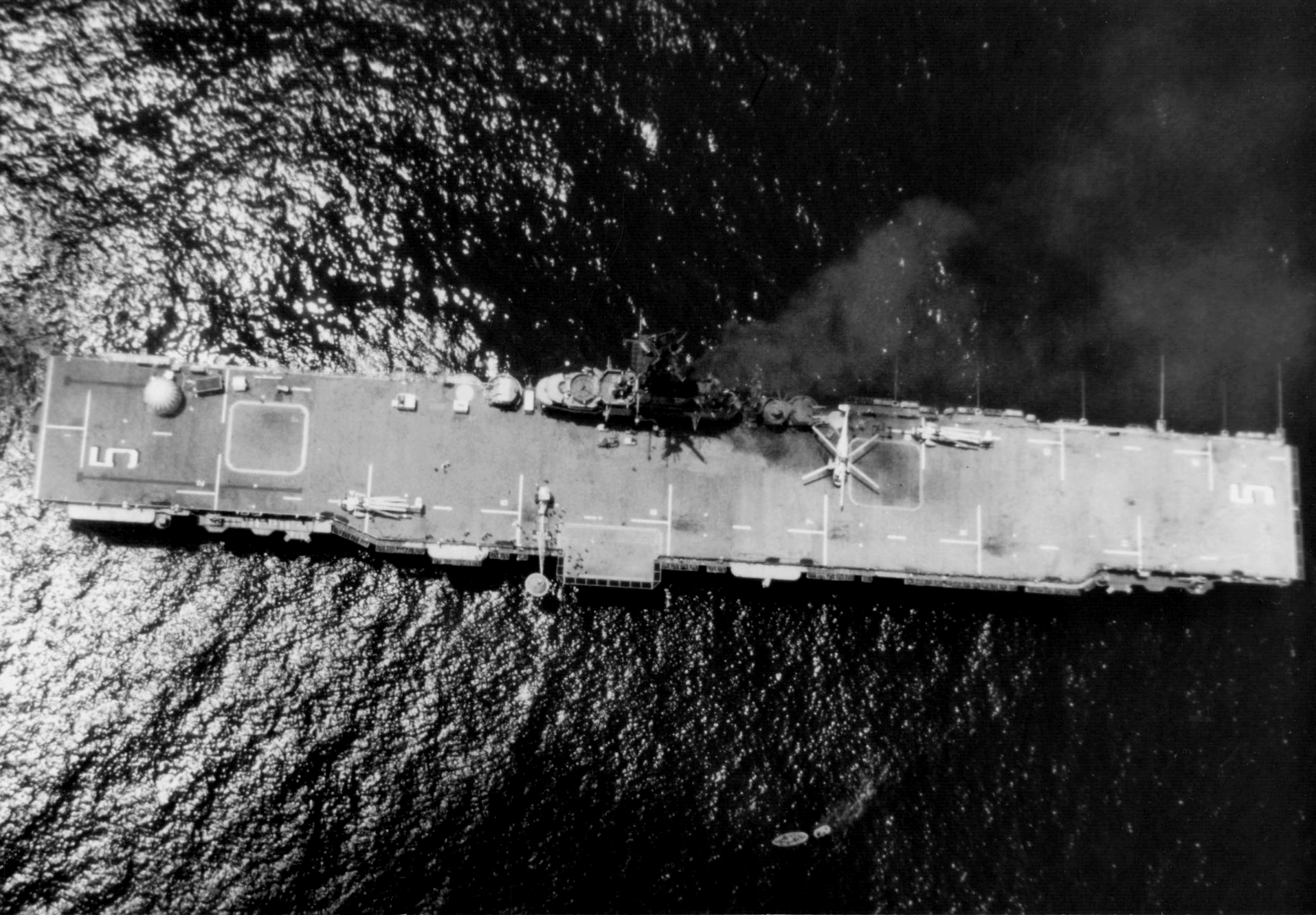
Princeton recovering Apollo 10 in 1969

In April 1969 she was designated the prime recovery ship for Apollo 10, the lunar mission which paved the way for Apollo 11 and the first crewed landing on the Moon. Apollo 10, carrying astronauts Eugene Cernan, John Young, and Thomas P. Stafford, was recovered in the South Pacific on 26 May.

On 30 January 1970, Princeton was decommissioned and struck from the Naval Vessel Register, and sold for scrapping to Zidell Explorations Inc., Portland in September 1972 by Defense Reutilization and Marketing Service.

After the ship was sold for scrapping, some of the steel deck plate was acquired by Fermilab in 1972 for use in its experimental areas. In 1978, Robert R. Wilson used portions of that steel to create the Broken Symmetry sculpture that stands over one of the laboratory's gates.

== Awards ==

Combat Action Ribbon (25 March 1967)	Navy Unit Commendation	Meritorious Unit Commendation (twice)
China Service Medal (extended)	American Campaign Medal	World War II Victory Medal
Navy Occupation Service Medal (with Asia clasp)	National Defense Service Medal (twice)	Korean Service Medal (8 battle stars)
Armed Forces Expeditionary Medal (thrice)	Vietnam Service Medal (6 battle stars)	Republic of Vietnam Gallantry Cross Unit Citation
United Nations Korean Medal	Republic of Vietnam Campaign Medal	Republic of Korea War Service Medal (retroactive)

== Gallery ==
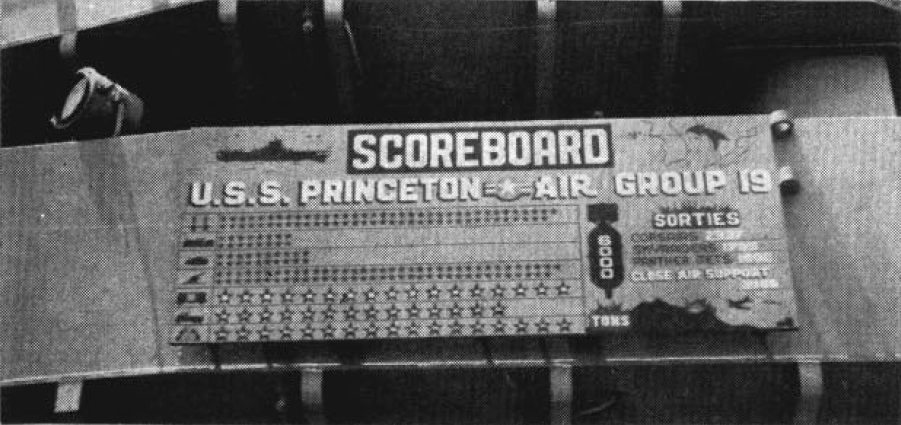
Carrier Air Group 19's scoreboard on Princeton in 1951

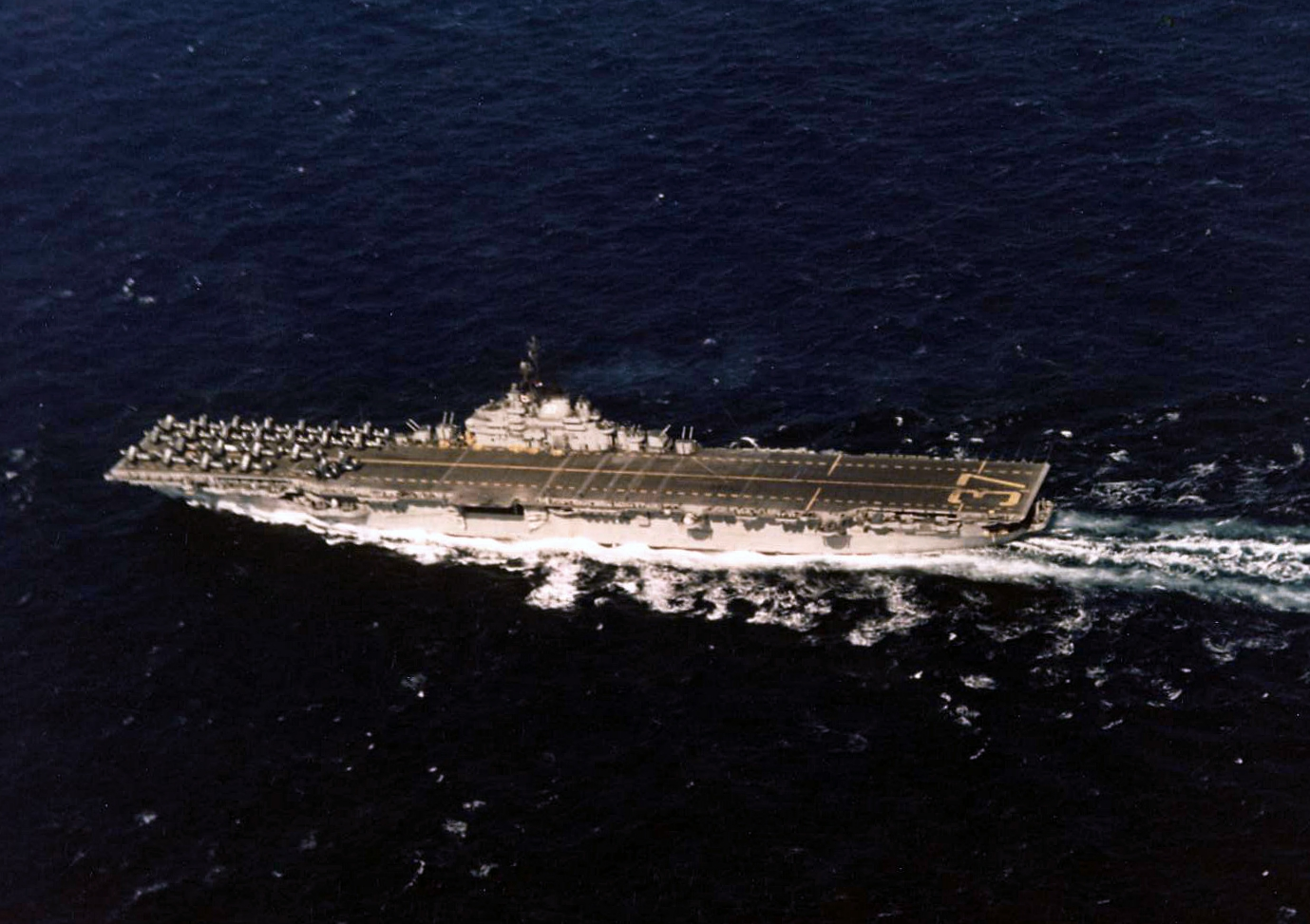
Princeton off Korea in 1951

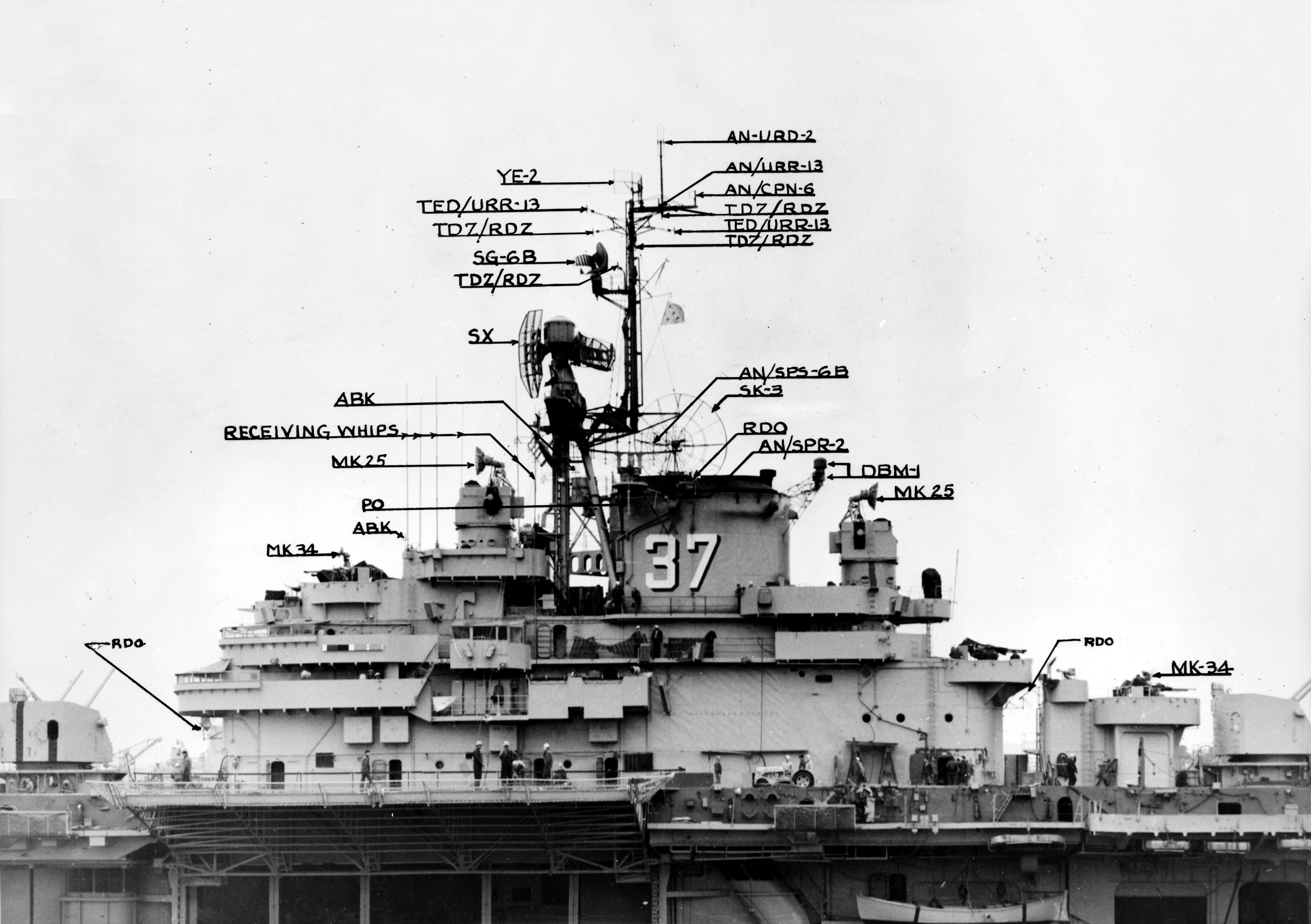
Radars of Princeton in 1952

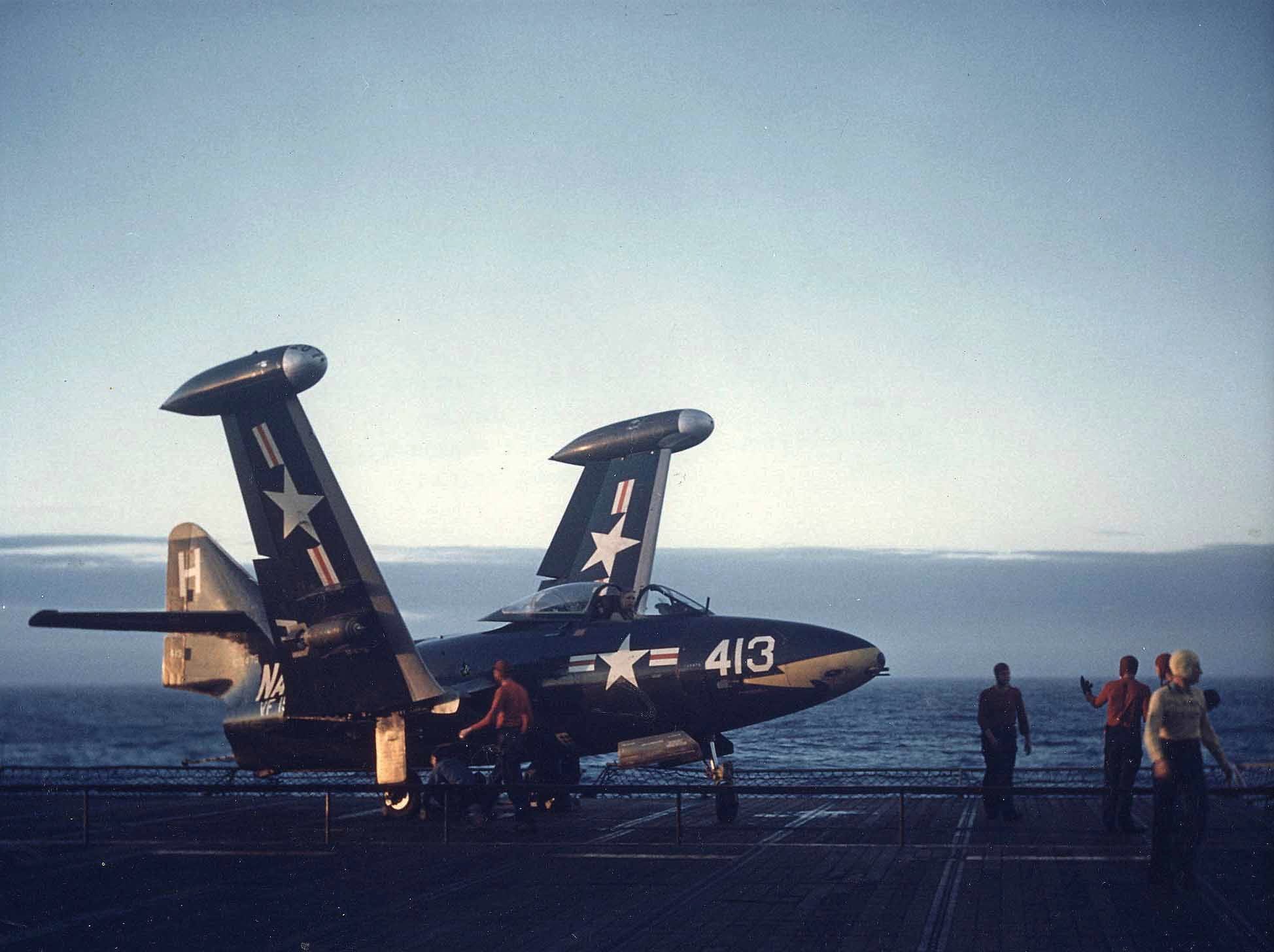
F9F-5 Panther of VF-154 on Princeton in May 1953

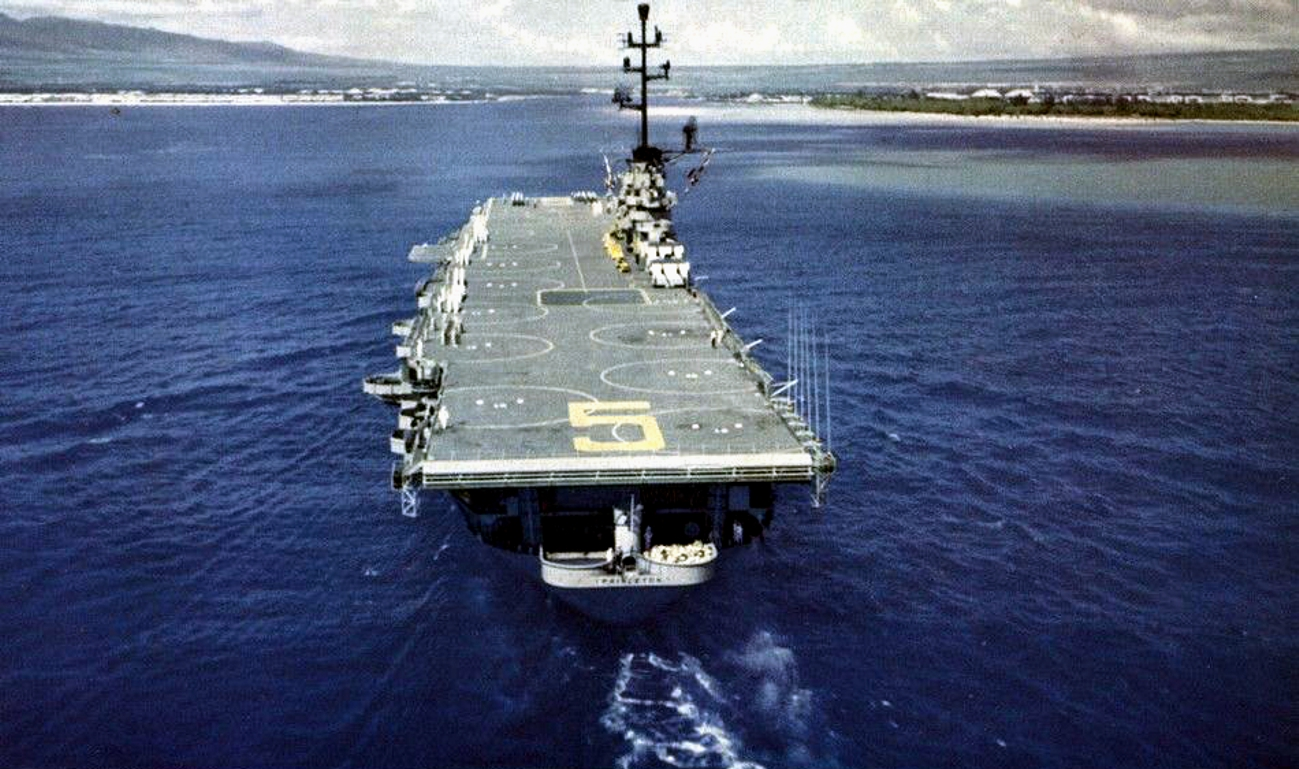
Princeton enters Pearl Harbor, in 1960

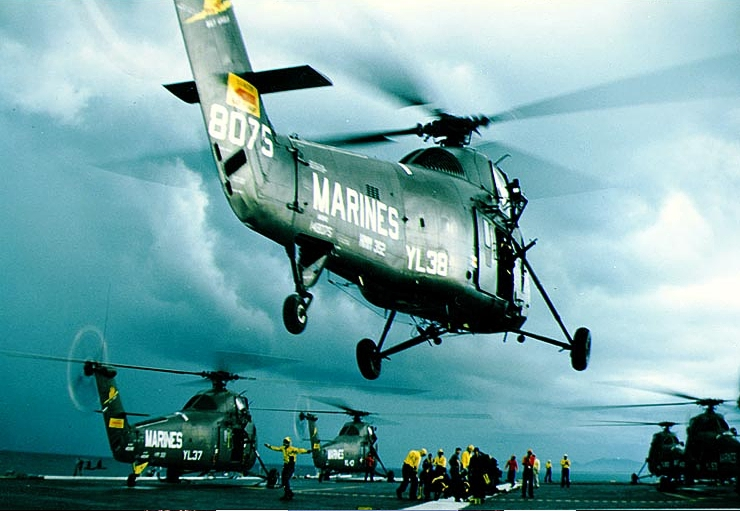
UH-34Ds lifting off from Princeton in 1966

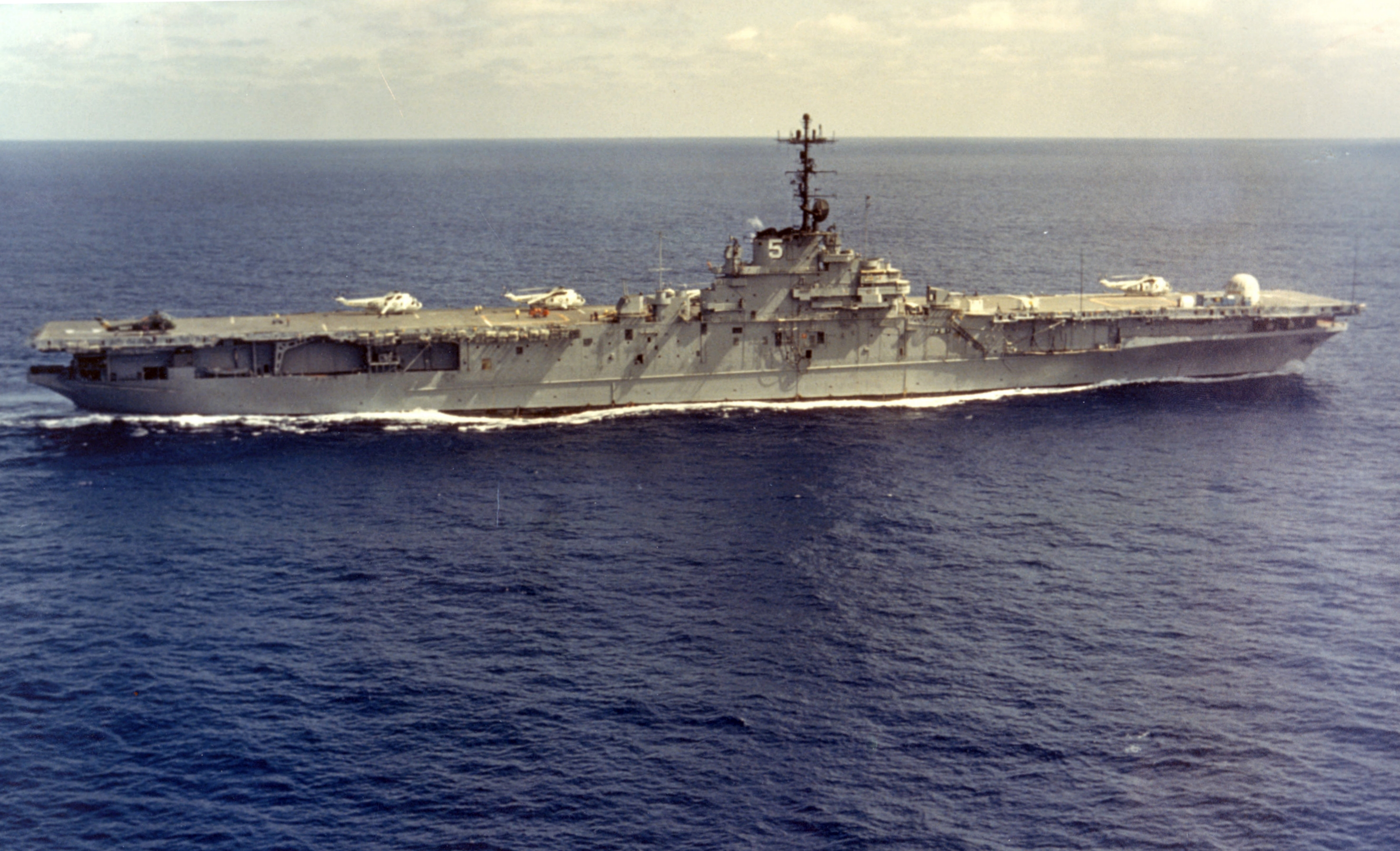
Princeton during the recovery of Apollo 10 in 1969

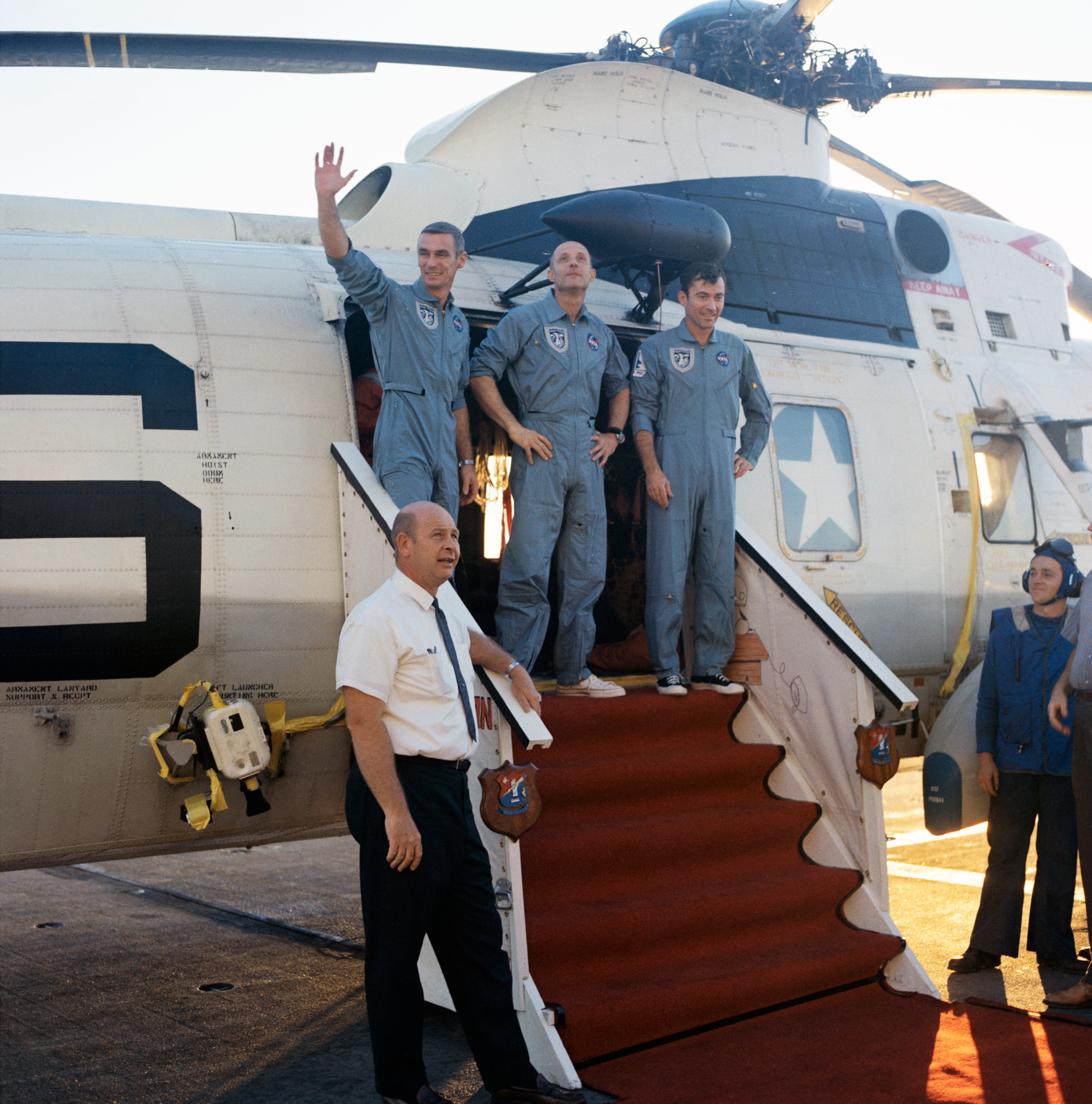
Apollo 10 crewmembers Eugene Cernan, Thomas P. Stafford, and John W. Young onboard Princeton, 26 May 1969

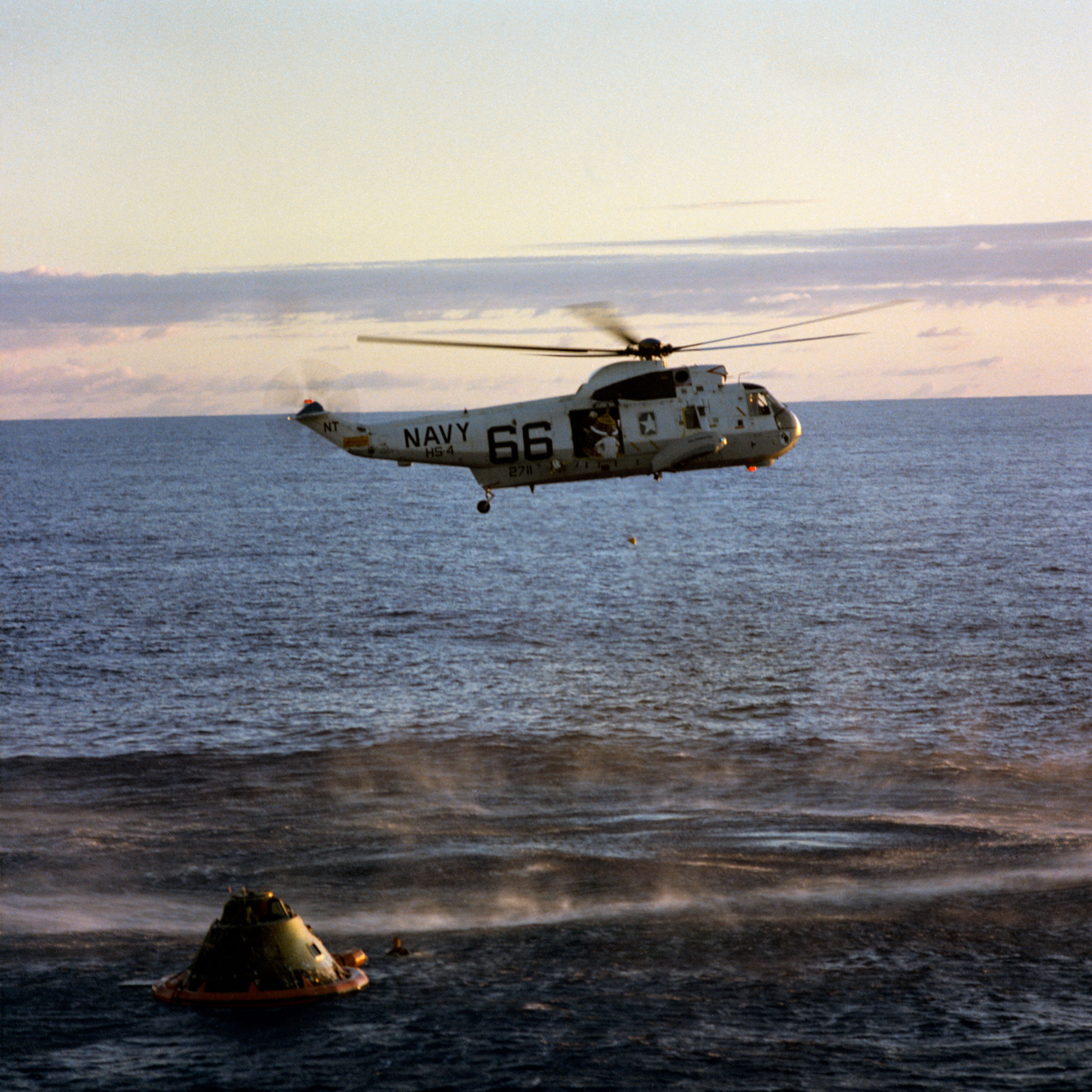
A member of the Apollo 10 crew is hoisted into a SH-3D Sea King from Princeton on 26 May 1969
