= 1986 United States bombing of Libya =

US April 1986 military operation in Libya

1986 United States bombing of Libya (Operation El Dorado Canyon)
- Part of the Cold War
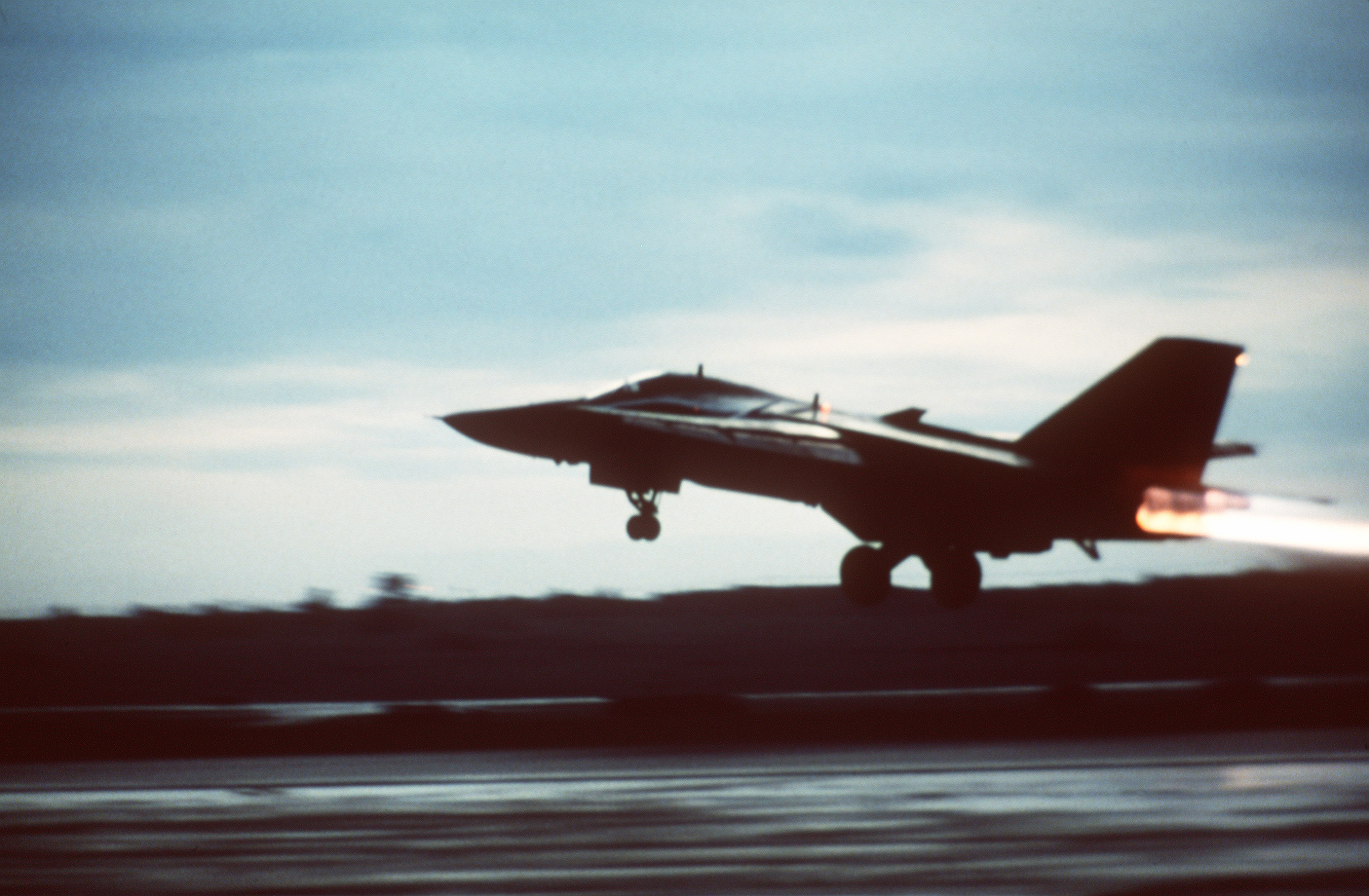
- An American 48th Tactical Fighter Wing F-111F aircraft takes off from RAF Lakenheath in April 1986 to participate in an air strike against Libya.
Date	15 April 1986
Location	Libya
Result	Ground targets destroyed; Failed assassination attempt against Gaddafi; Failed Libyan Scud missile response
Territorial changes	Libya renamed from Socialist People's Libyan Arab Jamahiriya to Great Socialist People's Libyan Arab Jamahiriya.

Belligerents
United States	Libya

Commanders and leaders
(United States) Ronald Reagan (United States) Caspar Weinberger	(Libya) Muammar Gaddafi

Casualties and losses
1 F-111 shot down 2 aircrew killed Libyan claim: 3 aircraft shot down	45 soldiers and officials killed 3–5 IL-76s destroyed 14 MiG-23s destroyed 2 helicopters destroyed 5 major ground radars destroyed
- 15 Libyan civilians killed

The United States Air Force (USAF), Navy, and Marine Corps carried out air strikes, code-named Operation El Dorado Canyon, against Libya on 15 April 1986 in retaliation for the West Berlin discotheque bombing ten days earlier, which U.S. president Ronald Reagan blamed on Libyan leader Muammar Gaddafi. There were 40 reported Libyan casualties; one U.S. plane was shot down. One of the claimed Libyan deaths was of a baby girl, reported to be Gaddafi's daughter, Hana Gaddafi. However, there are doubts both as to whether she was really killed, or even if she truly existed.

The targets were two alleged Libyan command and control centers for overseas operations, one training camp, and Benina and Mitiga International Airports. The strikes primarily used F-111 Aardvark fighter-bombers, launched from RAF Lakenheath and RAF Upper Heyford in the United Kingdom, and A-6E Intruder attack aircraft launched from the USS America (CV-66) and USS Coral Sea (CV-43) in the Gulf of Sidra. These were supported by electronic-warfare EF-111 Ravens and EA-6B Prowlers and anti-radar missile-carrying F/A-18 Hornets and A-7E Corsairs. Political disagreements led France, Spain, and Italy to deny the use of their United States Air Forces in Europe bases, and deny overflight permits.

Two USAF captains were killed when their F-111 was shot down over the Gulf of Sidra, possibly by a Libyan S-200 missile. Libya released the body of one pilot in 1989, and denied holding the body of the other pilot, while the pilot's family alleged they had.

== Origins ==
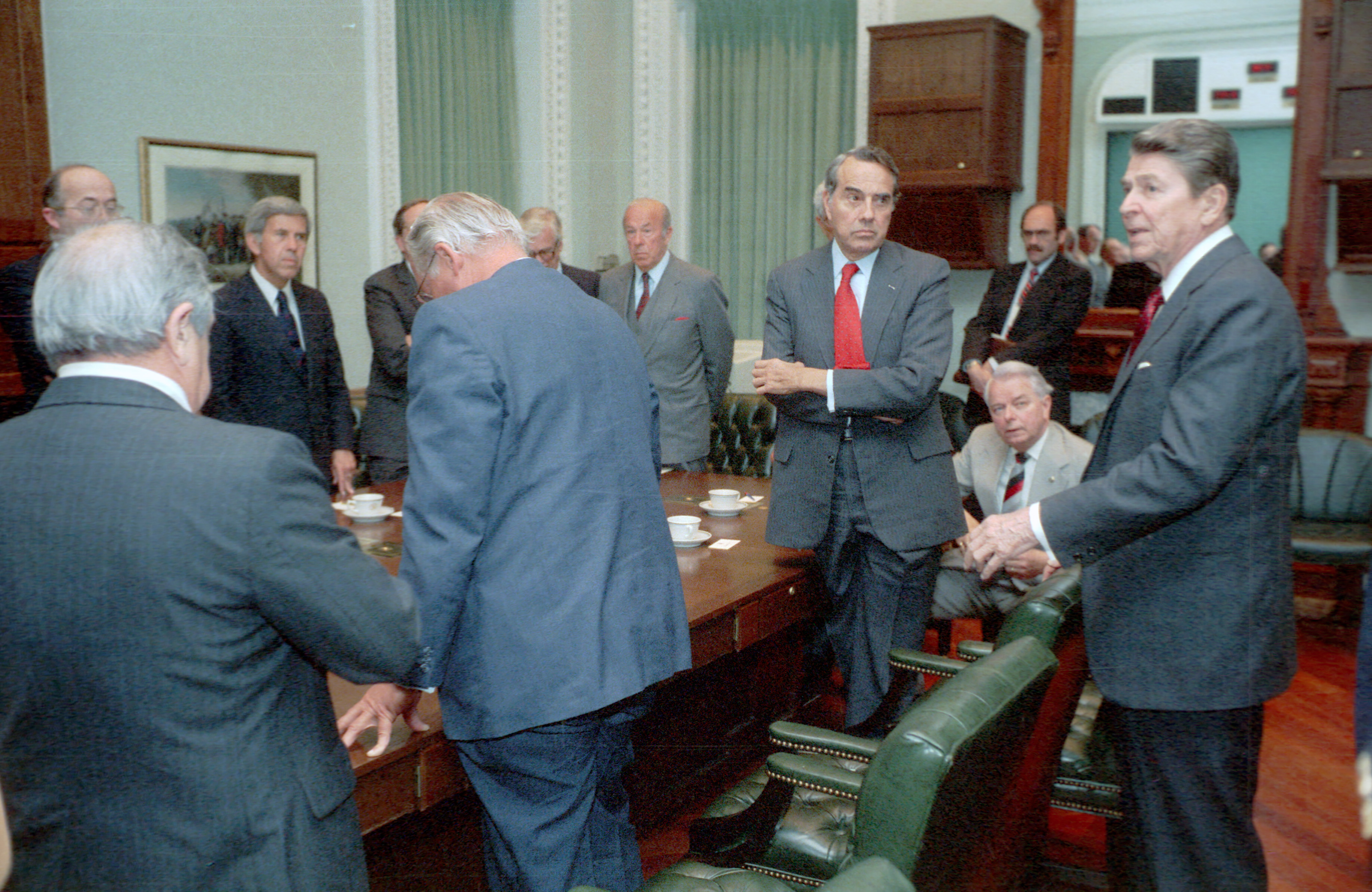
President Ronald Reagan consults bipartisan Congressional leaders about the strike.

Libya represented a high priority for President Ronald Reagan shortly after his 1981 inauguration. Libyan leader Muammar Gaddafi was firmly anti-Israel and had supported militant groups in the Palestinian territories and Syria. There were reports that Libya was attempting to become a nuclear power and Gaddafi's occupation of Chad, which was rich in uranium, was of major concern to the United States. Gaddafi's ambitions to set up a federation of Arab and Muslim states in North Africa were alarming to U.S. interests. Furthermore, then-U.S. Secretary of State Alexander Haig wanted to take proactive measures against Gaddafi because he had been using former Central Intelligence Agency (CIA) operatives (most notably Edwin P. Wilson and Frank E. Terpil) to help set up militia camps.

After the December 1985 Rome and Vienna airport attacks, which killed 19 and wounded approximately 140, Gaddafi indicated that he would continue to support the Red Army Faction, the Red Brigades, and the Irish Republican Army as long as the European governments allegedly “supported anti-Gaddafi Libyans.”

After years of occasional skirmishes with Libya over Libyan territorial claims to the Gulf of Sidra, the United States contemplated a military attack to strike targets within the Libyan mainland. In March 1986, the United States, asserting the 12-nautical-mile (22 km; 14 mi) limit to territorial waters according to international law, sent a carrier task force to the region. Libya responded with counter-maneuvers on the 24 March that led to a naval engagement in the Gulf of Sidra.

On 5 April 1986, Libyan agents bombed "La Belle" nightclub in West Berlin, killing three people, including two U.S. servicemen and a Turkish woman, and injuring 229 people, including 79 Americans. West Germany and the United States obtained cable transcripts from Libyan agents in East Germany who were involved in the attack.

More detailed information was retrieved years later when Stasi archives were investigated by the reunited Germany. Libyan agents who had carried out the operation from the Libyan embassy in East Germany were identified and prosecuted by Germany in the 1990s.

== Preparations ==
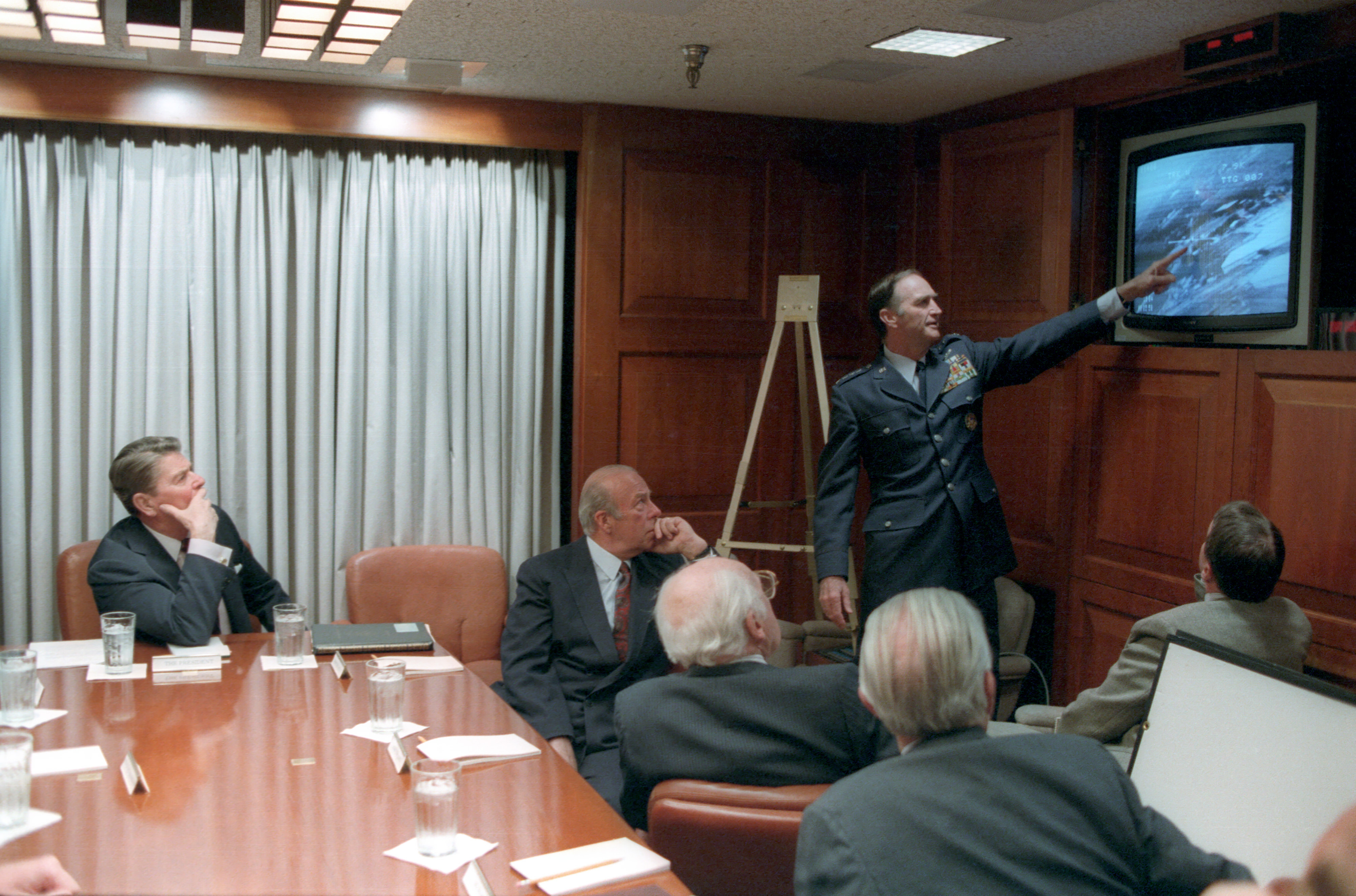
President of the United States Ronald Reagan in a briefing with US National Security Council staff on Operation El Dorado Canyon.

The attack mission against Libya had been preceded in October 1985 by an exercise in which the 20th TFW stationed at RAF Upper Heyford airbase in the UK, which was equipped with F-111E Aardvarks, received a top-secret order to launch a simulated attack mission on 18 October, with ten F-111Es armed with eight 500-lb practice bombs, against a simulated airfield located in Labrador, Canada south of CFB Goose Bay. The mission was designated Operation Ghost Rider. The mission was a full rehearsal for a long-range strike against Libya. The mission was completed successfully, with the exception of one aircraft that had all but one of its eight bombs hang up on one of its wing racks. The lessons learned were passed on to the 48th TFW which was equipped with the newer F-111F model.

In August 1985 six specially trained B-52H crews of the 23rd Bombardment Squadron in Minot, North Dakota, were designated as the Advanced Conventional Taskforce (ACT) and trained at specialized low-level conventional bombing missions, including the first ever use of Night Vision Goggles by B-52 crews. The specially trained crews were capable of delivering 6 strings of MK-117 munitions seconds apart with pinpoint accuracy operating from North Dakota. In six months of intensive training the special mission unit dropped more live ordnance in the Nevada and Utah test ranges than had been expended since the conclusion of the Vietnam War. The B-52 provided a powerful alternative or follow-on option, however, as the backbone of the U.S. nuclear deterrent there was some risk to using the B-52 option against an SA-6 defended target.

Elements of the then-secret 4450th Tactical Group (USAF) were put on standby to fly the strike mission against Libya. Over 30 F-117 Nighthawk stealth attack aircraft had already been delivered to Tactical Air Command (USAF) and were operating from Tonopah Test Range Airport in Nevada. European Command senior officers knew nothing about the stealth capabilities of the F-117, or that the aircraft even existed. Within an hour of the planned launch of the F-117s, Secretary of Defense Caspar Weinberger scrubbed the stealth mission, fearing a compromise of the secret aircraft and its development program. The air strike was carried out with conventional U.S. Navy and USAF aircraft. The F-117 would remain completely unknown to the world for several more months, before being unveiled in 1988 and featured prominently in media coverage of Operation Desert Storm.

For the Libyan raid, the United States was denied overflight rights by France, Spain, and Italy as well as the use of European continental bases, forcing the USAF portion of the operation to be flown around France and Spain, over Portugal and through the Straits of Gibraltar, adding 1,300 miles (2,100 km) each way and requiring multiple aerial refuelings. The French refusal alone added 2,800 km. French President François Mitterrand refused overflight clearance because the United States was interested in limited action in Libya while France was more interested in action that would remove Gaddafi from power. Another factor in the French decision was the United States' last-minute failure to participate in a retaliatory air raid on Iranian positions after the 1983 Beirut barracks bombings.

== Targets ==
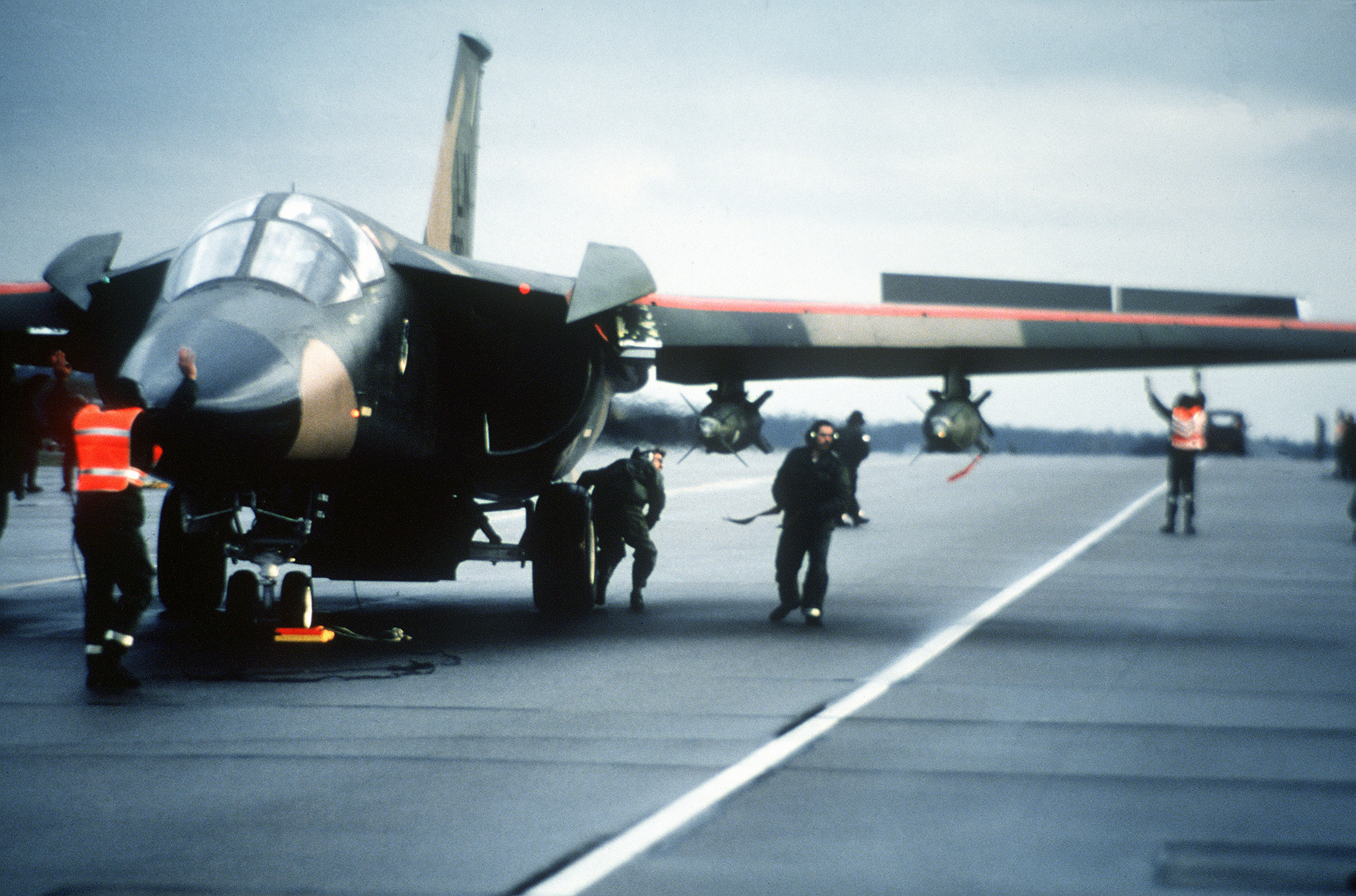
Ground crew prepares a 48th Tactical Fighter Wing F-111F aircraft for an air strike on Libya

After several unproductive days of meetings with European and Arab nations, and influenced by an American serviceman's death, on 14 April Ronald Reagan ordered an air raid on the following Libyan targets:

- Bab al-Azizia Barracks in Tripoli – Gaddafi's command and control center for overseas operations
- Murrat Sidi Bilal in Tripoli – a training camp for naval commandos and combat frogmen
- Mitiga International Airport – used by Ilyushin Il-76 transport aircraft
- Jamahiriyah Guard barracks in Benghazi – an alternative command and control headquarters for overseas operations, and which contained a warehouse for storage of MiG aircraft components
- Benina International Airport – used as a base by defending fighters

== Strike force ==
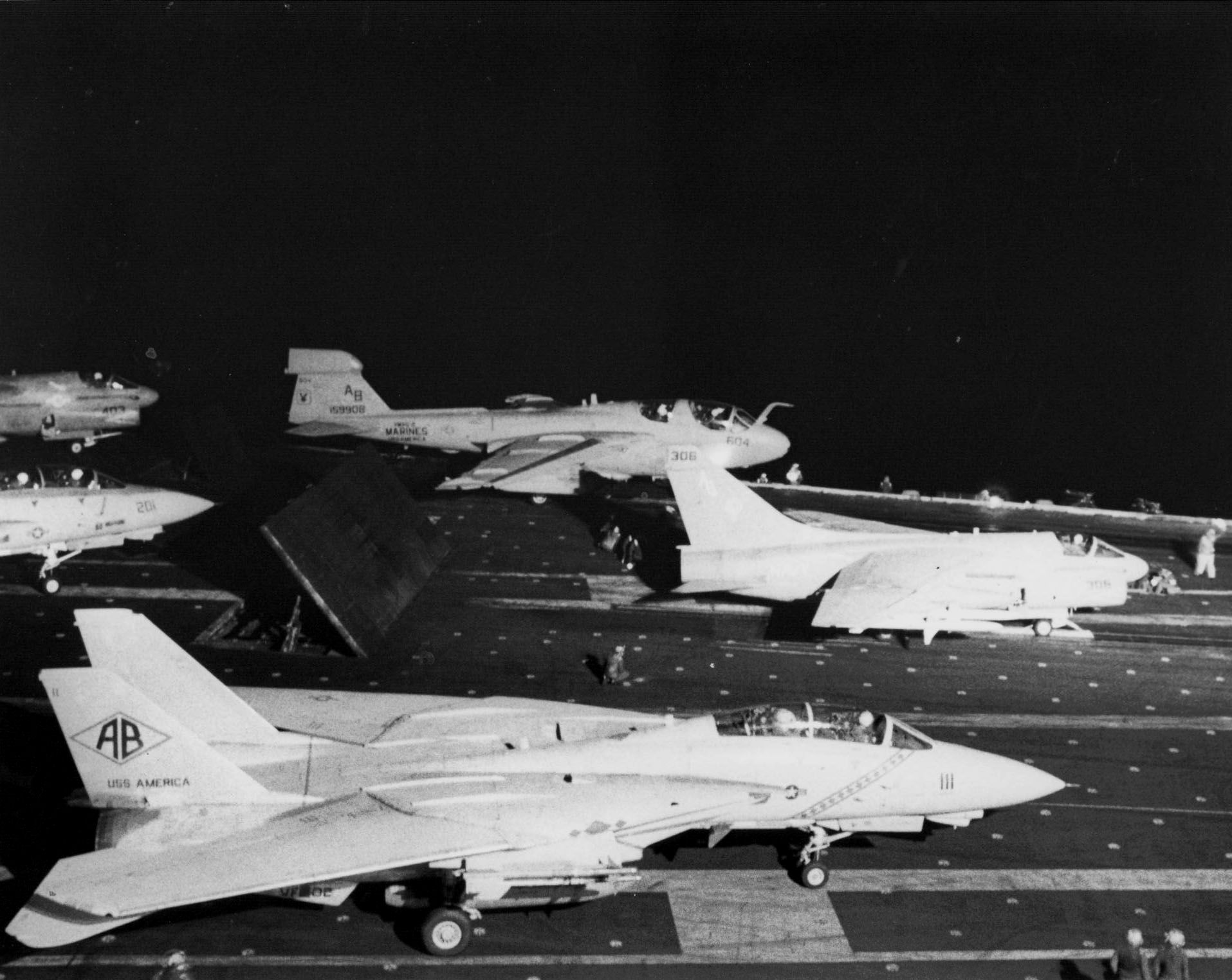
An F-14A Tomcat that launched from USS America (CV-66) during Operation El Dorado Canyon

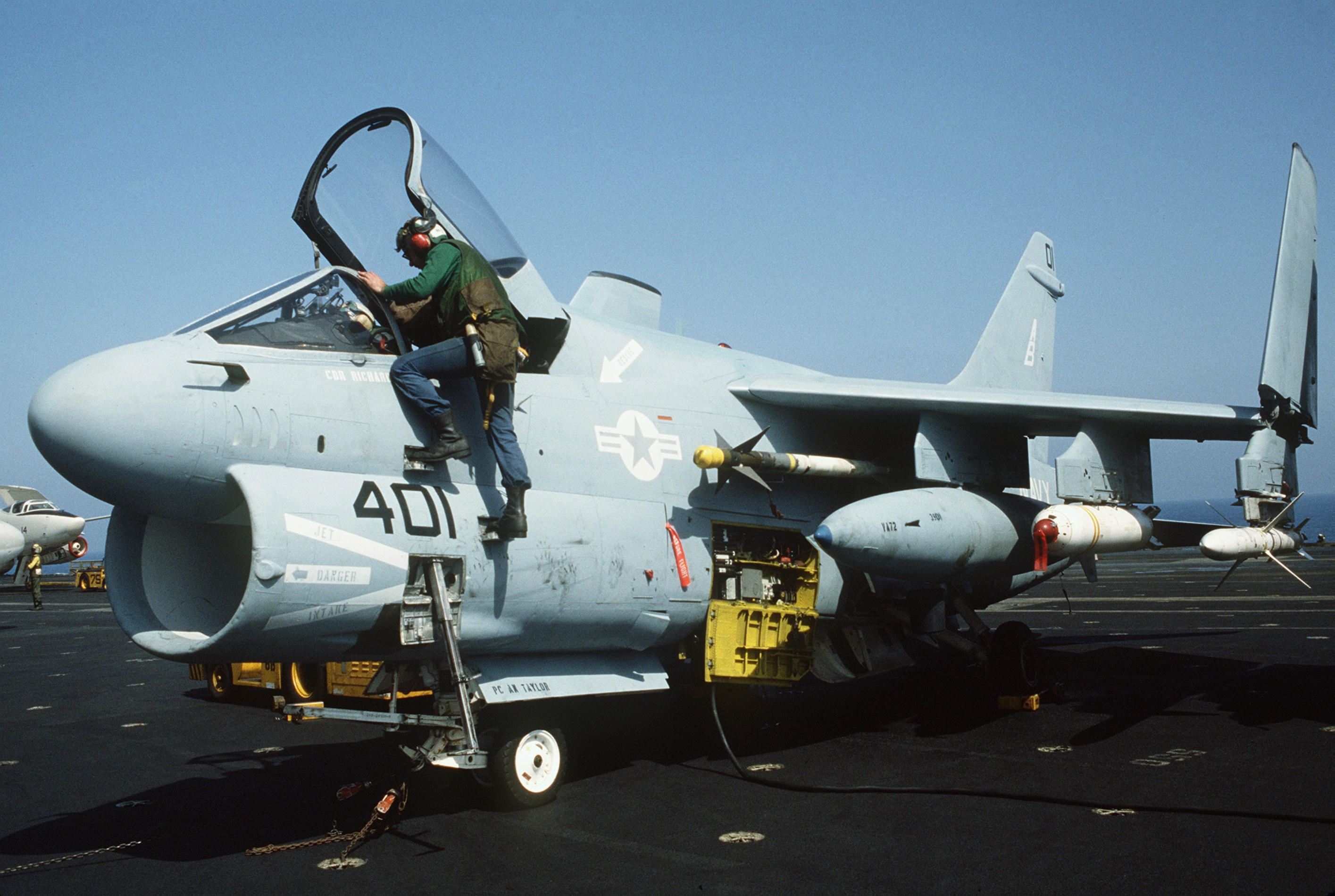
An A-7E from the USS America is armed with AGM-88 HARM ARMs and CBU-100 Rockeye cluster munitions, in preparation of Operation El Dorado Canyon

Among operational United States tactical aircraft, only the General Dynamics F-111 and the A-6 Intruder possessed the ability to attack at night with the required precision. Although the F-111s would be required to fly from distant bases, they were essential to mission success, because the eighteen A-6s available aboard USS Coral Sea (CV-43) and USS America (CV-66) could not carry enough bombs to simultaneously inflict the desired damage on the five targets selected.

=== United States Air Force ===
Twenty-eight McDonnell Douglas KC-10 Extenders and Boeing KC-135 Stratotankers took off from RAF Mildenhall and RAF Fairford shortly after 19:00 (Note: Parks specifies times of events with the time in Washington DC where the attack was coordinated. Parks's times have been adjusted to reflect the time observed where the battle took place.) on 14 April. These tankers would conduct four silent refueling operations over the 6,000 mi (9,700 km) round-trip route the F-111s would fly to target. Within minutes the tankers were followed by twenty-four F-111F strike aircraft of the 48th Tactical Fighter Wing, flying from RAF Lakenheath and five EF-111A Ravens of the 20th Tactical Fighter Wing from RAF Upper Heyford. Six F-111s and one EF-111 were designated spares who returned to base after the first refueling was completed without any system failures among the designated strike aircraft. One F-111F had a flameout of one engine upon take off and was ordered back to base.

NATO E-3A AWACS aircraft flying out of Trapani air base in Italy provided airborne surveillance.

=== United States Navy ===
America was on station in the Gulf of Sidra, but Coral Sea was preparing to leave the Mediterranean, and made a high speed run from Naples through the Strait of Messina. America's air group would strike targets in downtown Benghazi and provide fighter and suppression support for the USAF bombers, while Coral Sea's planes would strike the Benina airfield outside Benghazi and provide fighter and suppression support for the Navy bombers. About 01:00 America launched six A-6E TRAM Intruder strike aircraft with Mark 82 bombs against the Jamahiriyah Guard barracks and six A-7 Corsair II strike support aircraft. Coral Sea, operating east of America simultaneously launched eight A-6E TRAM Intruders and six F/A-18A Hornets. Additional fighters were launched for combat air patrol (CAP).

== The raid ==
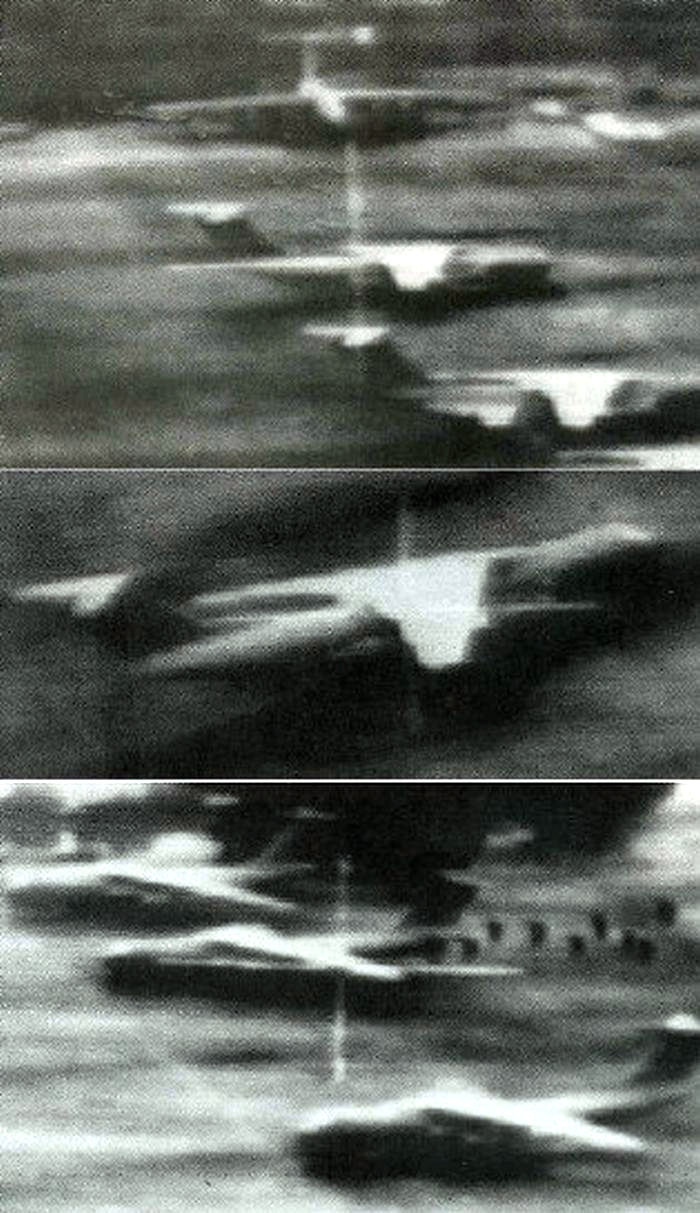
Ilyushin Il-76 targeted by the bombing

The raid began in the early hours of 15 April, with the stated objectives of sending a message and reducing Libya's ability to support and train terrorists. Shortly after the raid Reagan warned "Today, we have done what we had to do. If necessary, we shall do it again."

Coordinated jamming by the EF-111s and EA-6B Prowlers began at 01:54 (Libyan time) as the A-7Es and F/A-18As began launching AGM-88 HARM and AGM-45 Shrike missiles for suppression of enemy air defenses (SEAD). The attack began at 0200 hours (Libyan time), and lasted about twelve minutes, with 60 tons of munitions dropped. The F-111 bombers' rules of engagement required target identification by both radar and Pave Tack prior to bomb release to minimize collateral damage. Of the nine F-111s targeting Bab al-Azizia, only three placed their GBU-10 Paveway II bombs on target. One F-111 was shot down by a Libyan SAM over the Gulf of Sidra and one F-111's bombs missed the barracks, striking diplomatic and civilian sites in Tripoli, and narrowly missing the French embassy. All three F-111s assigned to Sidi Bilal released their GBU-10 bombs on target. One of the six F-111s assigned to bomb the Tripoli airfield aborted its mission with a terrain-following radar malfunction, but the remaining five dropped BSU-49 high drag bombs destroying two Il-76 transport aircraft. America's A-6s damaged the Jamahiriyah MiG assembly warehouse and destroyed four MiG shipping crates. Two A-6s from Coral Sea aborted their mission, but five A-6s with CBU-59 APAM cluster bombs and one with Mk 82 bombs struck Benina airfield destroying three or four MiGs, two Mil Mi-8 helicopters, one Fokker F27 Friendship transport, and one small straight-wing aircraft. A Boeing 727 was also reportedly destroyed during the Benina strike.

Some Libyan soldiers reportedly abandoned their positions in fright and confusion, while the officers were slow to give orders. Libyan anti-aircraft fire did not begin until after the planes had passed over their targets. No Libyan fighters launched, and HARM launches and jamming prevented any of the 2K12 Kub (SA-6), S-75 Dvina (SA-2), S-125 Neva/Pechora (SA-3), or Crotale SAM launches from homing. One SA-6 however was able to track onto an A-6 from VA-34 during the strike on the Jamahiriyah barracks but was evaded successfully.

Within twelve minutes, all United States aircraft were "feet wet" outbound over the Mediterranean. Navy strike aircraft had been recovered aboard their carriers by 02:53 (Libyan time) and surviving USAF planes, with the exception of one F-111, which landed in Naval Station Rota, Spain, with an overheated engine, had returned to Britain by 10:10 (Libyan time). Although the bombing operations were staged out of the UK, RAF Akrotiri in Cyprus was employed in the role of an alternate in case of emergency, and was used as such by at least one aircraft. This led to retaliatory action against the British base.

=== United States forces and targets ===
Operation results
Target		Planned		Actual		
Target		Aircraft	Bombing	Aircraft	Hit	Miss
Bab al-Azizia barracks		9× F-111F	36× GBU-10 2,000 lb (910 kg) LGB	3× bombed 1× missed 4× aborts 1× lost	13	3
Murat Sidi Bilal camp		3× F-111F	12× GBU-10 2,000 lb LGB	all bombed	12	–
Tripoli airfield (fmr. Wheelus Air Base)		6× F-111F	72× Mk 82 500 lb (230 kg) RDB	5× bombed 1× abort	60	–
Jamahiriyah (Benghazi) barracks		7× A-6E TRAM VA-34	84× Mk 82 500 lb RDB	6× bombed 1× abort on deck	70	2
Benina airfield		8× A-6E TRAM VA-55	72× Mk 20 500 lb CBU; 24× Mk 82 500 lb RDB	6× bombed 2× aborts	60× Mk 20; 12× Mk 82	–
Air defense networks	Tripoli	6× A-7E	8× Shrike; 16× HARM	all aircraft fired	8× Shrike; 16× HARM	
Air defense networks	Benghazi	24× F/A-18A VFA-131, VFA-132 VMFA-314, VMFA-323	20× HARM	all aircraft fired	20× HARM	
Totals		45 aircraft	300 bombs 48 missiles	35 bombed 1 missed 1 lost 8 aborts	227 hits 5 misses 48 homing missiles	
Support Aircraft
Air defense networks	Tripoli	5x EF-111A	ALQ-99	1× partial abort	–	–
Air defense networks	Tripoli	1x EA-6B VMAQ-2	ALQ-99	None	–	–
Air defense networks	Benghazi	3x EA-6B (2x VAQ-135/1x VMAQ-2)	ALQ-99	None	–	–
Air defense networks		3x EA-3B VQ-2	EW/AAR	None	–	–
Early Warning	–	2x E-2C VAW-123		None	–	–
Early Warning	–	2x E-2C VAW-127		None	–	–

=== Libyan air defenses ===
The Libyan air defense network was extensive, and included:

- 4 Long range S-200 Vega (SA-5 Gammon) anti-aircraft missile units with 24 launchers.
- 86 S-75 Volkhov (SA-2 Guideline) and S-125 Neva (SA-3 Goa) anti-aircraft missile units with 276 launchers.

Covering Tripoli alone were:

- 7 S-75 Volkhov (SA-2 Guideline) anti-aircraft missile units with 6 missiles launchers per unit giving 42 launchers.
- 12 S-125 Neva (SA-3 Goa) anti-aircraft missile units with 4 missiles launchers per unit giving 48 launchers.
- 3 2K12 Kub (SA-6 Gainful) anti-aircraft missile units with 48 launchers.
- 1 9K33M2 Osa-AK (SA-8 Geko) anti-aircraft regiment with 16 launch vehicles.
- 2 Crotale II anti-aircraft units with 60 launch pads.

== Casualties ==
=== Libyan ===
Libyan leader Muammar Gaddafi and his family rushed out of their residence in the Bab al-Azizia compound moments before the bombs dropped, forewarned by a telephone call from Karmenu Mifsud Bonnici, Malta's Prime Minister. Bonnici had been made aware of the presence of the American strike force by Prime Minister Bettino Craxi of Italy; the latter nation had detected the then-unidentified aircraft off the West coast of Sicily and scrambled a flight of F-104 Starfighters to intercept it, discovering the strike force's presence and being warned away by pilots with obvious American accents.

According to medical staff in a nearby hospital, two dozen casualties were brought in wearing military uniforms, and two without uniforms. Total Libyan casualties were estimated at 60, including those at the bombed airbases. An infant girl was among the casualties; her body was shown to American reporters, who were told she was Gaddafi's recently adopted daughter Hana. However, there was and remains much skepticism over the claim. She may not have died; the adoption may have been posthumous; or he may have adopted a second daughter and given her the same name after the first one died.

=== American ===
Two U.S. Air Force captains—Fernando L. Ribas-Dominicci and Paul F. Lorence—were killed when their F-111 fighter-bomber (callsign Karma-52) was shot down over the Gulf of Sidra. In the hours following the attack, the U.S. military refused to speculate as to whether or not the fighter-bomber had been shot down, with Defense Secretary Caspar Weinberger suggesting that it could have experienced radio trouble or been diverted to another airfield. The next day, the Pentagon had announced it was no longer searching for the F-111 believed to be downed by a Libyan missile. On 25 December 1988, Gaddafi offered to release the body of Lorence to his family through Pope John Paul II. The body, returned in 1989, was identified as Ribas-Dominicci's from dental records. An autopsy conducted in Spain confirmed that he had drowned after his plane was shot down over the Gulf of Sidra. Libya denies that it held Lorence's body. However, Lorence's brother said that he and his mother saw television footage of a Libyan holding a white helmet with the name "Lorence" stenciled on the back. Furthermore, William C. Chasey, who toured the Bab al-Azizia barracks, claimed to have seen two flight suits and helmets engraved with the names "Lorence" and "Ribas-Dominicci", as well as the wreckage of their F-111. Gaddafi declared that the raid was a Libyan victory and stated that three American planes had been shot down, but Karma-52 was the only one that failed to return to base.

== Aftermath ==
=== In Libya ===
==== Gaddafi's announcements ====
Gaddafi announced that he had "won a spectacular military victory over the United States" and the country was officially renamed the "Great Socialist People's Libyan Arab Jamahiriyah".

Gaddafi said reconciliation between Libya and the United States was impossible so long as Reagan was in the White House; of the US president he said, "He is mad. He is foolish. He is an Israeli dog." He said he had no plans to attack the United States or U.S. targets. He claimed that Reagan wanted to kill him, stating "Was Reagan trying to kill me? Of course. The attack was concentrated on my house and I was in my house", he also described how he rescued his family. When asked whether he was in danger of losing power, he said: "Really, these reports and writings are not true. As you can see I am fine, and there has been no change in our country."

==== Other events ====
The Government of Libya said that the United States had fallen prey to arrogance and madness of power and wanted to become the world's policeman. It charged that any party that did not agree to become an American vassal was an outlaw, a terrorist, and a devil.

Gaddafi quashed an internal revolt, the organization of which he blamed on the United States, although Gaddafi appeared to have left the public sphere for a time in 1986 and 1987.

The Libyan Post dedicated several postage stamps issues to the event, from 1986 until 2001. The first issue was released in 1986, 13 July (ref. Scott catalogue n.1311 – Michel catalogue n.1699). The last issue was released in 2001, 15 April (ref. Scott catalogue n.1653 – Michel catalogue n.2748–2763).

=== Libyan retaliation ===
==== Immediate ====
Libya responded by firing two Scud missiles at a United States Coast Guard station on the Italian island of Lampedusa which fell short of the island and landed in the sea.

==== Later Libyan-connected terrorism ====
There was only limited change in Libyan-connected terrorism.

The Libyan government was alleged to have ordered the hijacking of Pan Am Flight 73 in Pakistan on 5 September 1986, which resulted in the deaths of 20 people. The allegation did not come to light until it was reported by The Sunday Times in March 2004—days after British Prime Minister Tony Blair paid the first official visit to Tripoli by a Western leader in a generation.

In October 1986, Gaddafi financed Jeff Fort's Al-Rukn faction of the Chicago Black P. Stones gang, in their emergence as an anti-American armed revolutionary movement. Al-Rukn members were arrested for preparing strikes on behalf of Libya, including blowing up US government buildings and bringing down an airplane; the Al-Rukn defendants were convicted in 1987 of "offering to commit bombings and assassinations on US soil for Libyan payment."

In May 1987, Australia expelled diplomats and broke off relations with Libya, claiming Libya sought to fuel violence in Australia and Oceania.

In late 1987 French authorities stopped a merchant vessel, the MV Eksund, which was attempting to deliver 150 tons of Soviet arms from Libya to the Irish Republican Army (IRA), partly in retaliation against the British for harboring American fighter planes.

In Beirut, Lebanon, two British hostages held by the Libyan-supported Abu Nidal Organization, Leigh Douglas and Philip Padfield, along with an American named Peter Kilburn, were shot dead in revenge. In addition, journalist John McCarthy was kidnapped, and tourist Paul Appleby was murdered in Jerusalem. Another British hostage named Alec Collett was also killed in retaliation for the bombing of Libya. Collett was shown being hanged in a video tape. His body was found in November 2009.

On 21 December 1988 Libya bombed Pan Am Flight 103, which exploded in mid-air and crashed on the town of Lockerbie in Scotland after a bomb detonated, killing all 259 people aboard, and 11 people in Lockerbie. Iran was initially thought to have been responsible for the bombing in revenge for the downing of Iran Air flight 655 by the American missile cruiser USS Vincennes over the Persian Gulf, but in 1991 two Libyans were charged, one of whom was convicted of the crime in a controversial judgement on 31 January 2001. The Libyan Government accepted responsibility for the Pan Am Flight 103 bombing on 29 May 2002, and offered $2.7 billion to compensate the families of the 270 victims. The convicted Libyan, Abdelbaset al-Megrahi, who was suffering from terminal prostate cancer, was released in August 2009 by the Scottish Government on compassionate grounds. He died in 2012. In May 2014 a group of relatives of the Lockerbie victims continued to campaign for al-Megrahi's name to be cleared by reopening the case.

=== International response ===
==== Immediate ====
The attack was condemned by many countries. By a vote of 79 in favor to 28 against with 33 abstentions, the United Nations General Assembly adopted resolution 41/38, which "condemns the military attack perpetrated against the Socialist People's Libyan Arab Jamahiriya on 15 April 1986, which constitutes a violation of the Charter of the United Nations and of international law."

A meeting of the Non-Aligned Movement said that it condemned the "dastardly, blatant and unprovoked act of aggression". The League of Arab States expressed that it was outraged at the United States aggression and that it reinforced an element of anarchy in international relations. The Assembly of Heads of State of the African Union said that the deliberate attempt to kill Libyans violated the principles of international law. The Government of Iran asserted that the attack constituted a policy of aggression, gunboat diplomacy, an act of war, and called for an extensive political and economic boycott of the United States. Others saw the United States motive as an attempt to eliminate Libya's revolution.

China stated that the U.S. attack violated norms of international relations and had aggravated tension in the region. The Soviet Union said that there was a clear link between the attack and U.S. policy aimed at stirring up existing hotbeds of tension and creating new ones, and at destabilizing the international situation. West Germany stated that international disputes required diplomatic and not military solutions, and France also criticized the bombing.

Some observers held the opinion that Article 51 of the UN Charter set limitations on the use of force in exercising the legitimate right of self-defense in the absence of an act of aggression, and affirmed that there was no such act by Libya. It was charged that the United States did not exhaust the Charter provisions for settling disputes under Article 33. The Wall Street Journal protested that if other nations applied Article 51 as cavalierly as the United States, then "the Nicaraguan government, very reasonably predicting that the U.S. is planning an attack on its territory, has the right to bomb Washington." British Shadow Foreign Secretary Denis Healey told ABC News that, "by this same rationale of defense against future attack, Britain could bomb apartment blocks in New York and Chicago on the ground that they contained people sending money and military supplies to the Irish Republican Army."

The Reagan Administration did not subscribe to any such limitations. Legal Advisor to the State Department Abraham Sofaer argued that “where an American is attacked because he is an American, in order to punish the U.S. or to coerce the U.S. into accepting a political position, the attack is one in which the U.S. has a sufficient interest to justify extending its protection through necessary and proportionate actions.” Moreover, the Administration maintained the legality of their actions under the 1973 War Powers Resolution. Sofaer testified that the Administration had no expectation that the Freedom of Navigation operation in the Gulf of Sidra would result in combat, that it notified Congress within forty-eight hours after hostilities occurred, and that it consulted with congressional leaders prior to the bombing despite the potential risk of an information leak.

Others asserted that Libya was innocent in the bombing of the West Berlin discotheque.

The U.S. received support from the UK, Canada, Australia, Israel, and 25 other countries. Its doctrine of declaring a war on what it called "terrorist havens" was not repeated until 1998, when President Bill Clinton ordered strikes on six terrorist camps in Afghanistan. Margaret Thatcher's approval of the use of Royal Air Force bases led to substantial public criticism, including an unprecedented story in The Sunday Times suggesting the Queen was upset by an "uncaring" Prime Minister. However, the Americans strongly endorsed Thatcher, and the long-standing Special Relationship between the United States and Britain was strengthened.

Although the Soviet Union was ostensibly friendly with Libya, it had, by the time of the Libya bombing, made its increasing ambivalence toward Libya apparent in public communications. Gaddafi had a history of verbally attacking the policy agendas and ideology of the Soviet Union, and he often engaged in various international interventions and meddling that conflicted with Soviet goals in a variety of spheres. During a period where the Soviet Union was apparently attempting to lead a subtle diplomatic effort that could impact its global status, close association with the whims of Gaddafi became a liability.

In the entire crisis, the Soviet Union explicitly announced that it would not provide additional help to Libya beyond resupplying basic armaments and munitions. It made no attempt to militarily intimidate the United States, despite the ongoing American operations in the Gulf of Sidra and its previous knowledge that the United States might launch an attack. The Soviet Union did not completely ignore the event, issuing a denunciation of this 'criminal' act by the United States.

After the raid, Moscow did cancel a planned visit to the United States by foreign affairs minister Eduard Shevardnadze. At the same time, it clearly signaled that it did not want this action to affect negotiations about the upcoming summer summit between the United States and the Soviet Union and its plans for new arms control agreements.

Former U.S. Attorney General Ramsey Clark, acting for Libyan citizens who had been killed or injured in the bombing raid by the U.S. using British air bases, brought suit under international law against the United States and the United Kingdom in U.S. federal court. The lawsuit was dismissed as frivolous. A subsequent appeal was denied, and monetary sanctions against Clark were allowed. Saltany v. Reagan, 886 F. 2d 438 (D.C. Cir. 1989).

==== UN response ====
Every year, between at least 1994 and 2006, the United Nations General Assembly scheduled a declaration from the Organization of African Unity about the incident, but systematically deferred the discussion year after year until formally putting it aside (along with several other issues which had been similarly rescheduled for years) in 2005.

==== First anniversary ====
On the first anniversary of the bombing, April 1987, European and North American left-wing activists gathered to commemorate the anniversary. After a day of social and cultural networking with local Libyans, including a tour of Gaddafi's bombed house, the group gathered with other Libyans for a commemoration event.

==== 2009 comment ====
In June 2009, during a visit to Italy, Gaddafi criticized American foreign policy and, asked as to the difference between al-Qaeda attacks and the 1986 U.S. bombing of Tripoli, he commented: "If al-Qaeda leader Osama bin Laden has no state and is an outlaw, America is a state with international rules."

=== Settlement of claims ===
On 28 May 2008, the United States began negotiations with Libya on a comprehensive claims settlement agreement to resolve outstanding claims of American and Libyan nationals against each country in their respective courts. Gaddafi's son Saif al-Islam publicly announced that an agreement was being negotiated in July of that year. On 14 August 2008, the resulting U.S.-Libya Comprehensive Claims Settlement Agreement was signed in Tripoli by Assistant Secretary of State for Near Eastern Affairs David Welch and by Libyan Secretary for American Affairs Ahmad Fituri.

In October 2008, Libya paid US$1.5 billion (in three installments of $300 million on 9 October 2008, $600 million on 30 October 2008, and US$600 million 31 October 2008) into a fund used to compensate the following victims and their relatives:

- Lockerbie bombing victims, who were given an additional US$2 million each after having been paid US$8 million earlier;
- American victims of the 1986 West Berlin discotheque bombing;
- American victims of the 1989 UTA Flight 772 bombing; and,
- Libyan victims of the 1986 U.S. bombing of Tripoli and Benghazi.

To pay the settlement, Libya demanded US$1.5 billion from global oil companies operating in Libya's oil fields, under threat of "serious consequences" to their leases. Libya's settlement was at least partially funded by several companies, including some based in the U.S., that chose to cooperate with Libya's demand.

On 4 August 2008, President George W. Bush signed into law the Libyan Claims Resolution Act, which had unanimously passed Congress on 31 July. The Act provided for the restoration of Libya's sovereign, diplomatic, and official immunities before U.S. courts if the Secretary of State certified that the United States Government has received sufficient funds to resolve outstanding terrorism-related death and physical injury claims against Libya.

On 14 August 2008, the United States and Libya signed a comprehensive claims settlement agreement. Full diplomatic relations were restored between the two nations.

=== In songs and books ===
English alternative band The The’s 1986 album Infected features the song "Sweet Bird of Truth" which tells the fictionalized story of a US pilot on the Libya bombing raids. It continues to feature as a popular song on their live tours.

In 1986, hardcore punk band The Meatmen referred to the lack of French cooperation with the raid in their song "French People Suck": "French people suck, I just gotta' say/made the jet fighter pilots fly out of their way." This song appears on the album Rock & Roll Juggernaut (Caroline Records).

In 1987, Neil Young wrote "Mideast Vacation" a song from his live album, Life about the bombing.

On Roger Waters's third studio album, Amused to Death the songs "Late Home Tonight, Part I" and "Late Home Tonight, Part II" recall the bombing from the perspective of two "ordinary wives' and a young American F-111 pilot.

In Nelson DeMille's book The Lion's Game, published in 2000, there is a detailed but fictionalized description of the attack from the point of view of one of the book's main protagonists.

== See also ==
- Foreign policy of the Ronald Reagan administration#Libya
- 2011 military intervention in Libya
- Gulf of Sidra incident (1981), US–Libyan air engagement over territorial claim, two Libyan jets shot down
- Ouadi Doum air raid (February 1986)
- Action in the Gulf of Sidra (1986), Naval battle between Libyan and US forces before the April bombing campaign
- Gulf of Sidra incident (1989), US-Libyan air engagement over territorial claim, two Libyan jets shot down
- Pan Am Flight 73 (1986)
- Pan Am Flight 103 (1988)
- Operation Odyssey Dawn (2011)
- List of modern conflicts in North Africa
