= Fernando L. Ribas-Dominicci =

US Air Force pilot (1952–1986 (KIA))

Fernando Luis Ribas-Dominicci
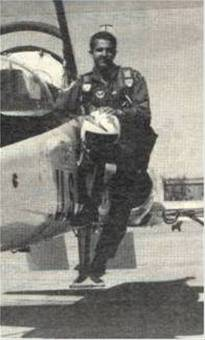
- Born: June 24, 1952; Utuado, Puerto Rico
- Died: April 15, 1986 (aged 33); Gulf of Sidra
- Burial place: San Andres Cemetery; Utuado, Puerto Rico
- Military career
- Allegiance: United States
- Branch: Air Force Reserve; United States Air Force
- Service years: 1975–1976 (USAFR); 1976–1986 (USAF)
- Rank: Major
- Nickname: "Nando"
- Unit: 48th Tactical Fighter Wing
- Conflicts: Operation El Dorado Canyon †
- Awards: Purple Heart; Air Force Commendation Medal

Fernando Luis Ribas-Dominicci (June 24, 1952 – April 15, 1986), was a captain and F-111F pilot in the United States Air Force. He was killed in action during the U.S. air raid on Libya, Operation El Dorado Canyon, on April 15, 1986. Ribas Dominicci was awarded the Purple Heart and posthumously promoted to the rank of major.

== Early years ==
Ribas-Dominicci was born in the town of Utuado, in the mountains of Puerto Rico, where he received his primary and secondary education. As a child, he had always dreamed of becoming a pilot and after he graduated from high school, he entered the University of Puerto Rico at Mayagüez where he earned his bachelor's degree in civil engineering. As a student in the university, he was a member of the campus' Air Force ROTC program and upon graduation was commissioned a second lieutenant in the U.S. Air Force. Served in the United States Air Force Reserve from 1975 to 1976.

== Military career ==
Ribas-Dominicci next completed Undergraduate Pilot Training and was awarded his pilot wings at Laughlin Air Force Base, later he was assigned to Cannon Air Force Base, in New Mexico, where he received advanced training as a General Dynamics F-111 combat pilot. He served as an F-111 Aardvark pilot with the 522nd Fighter Squadron and then the 523d Fighter Squadron of the 27th Fighter Wing at Cannon AFB. By 1983, Ribas-Dominicci was a captain and the recipient of the Air Force Commendation Medal. In 1985, he completed his master's degree in aeronautical science at the Embry-Riddle Aeronautical University in Daytona Beach, Florida, United States.

=== Operation El Dorado Canyon ===
On April 15, 1986, in response to acts of terrorism sponsored by Libyan leader Muammar al-Gaddafi, the United States attacked key terrorist training facilities in Tripoli, Libya, using 18 USAF F-111F fighter-bombers and 5 EF-111A radar jamming aircraft from bases in England. The attack was code-named Operation El Dorado Canyon. This was part of a joint strike mission in coordination with US Navy aircraft which struck targets in Behghazi, Libya, at the same time. Major Ribas-Dominicci was one of the pilots who participated in the air raid as member of the 48th Tactical Fighter Wing. His F-111F was shot down in action over the disputed Gulf of Sidra off the Libyan coast. Ribas-Dominicci and his weapon systems officer, Captain Paul F. Lorence, were the only U.S. casualties of the mission.

== Aftermath ==
On December 25, 1988, after years of denying that they had the bodies of the two crew members, Gaddafi offered to release the body of Lorence to his family through Pope John Paul II. The body recovered and thought to be that of Lorence was actually that of then-Captain Fernando L. Ribas-Domminici, which was identified by dental records and returned in 1989.

The Libyan government has denied that it holds Lorence's remains and the U.S government does not believe that they are hiding anything. Major Fernando Luis Ribas-Dominicci's remains are buried in his hometown of Utuado.

== Honors and legacy ==
Both men's names are engraved in the F-111 "Vark" Memorial Park located in Clovis, New Mexico. Ribas-Dominicci was awarded the Purple Heart and posthumously promoted to the rank of major, effective April 15, 1986.

The Ribas-Dominicci Plaza at Laughlin AFB was Named in Honor of Maj. Fernando Ribas-Dominicci on May 26, 1989. He graduated with Laughlin Undergraduate Pilot Training Class 77-05.

To honor his memory, the Government of Puerto Rico renamed the Isla Grande Airport in San Juan to Fernando Luis Ribas Dominicci Airport. The City of Utuado honored the pilot by naming a main avenue as Fernando Ribas-Dominicci Avenue. A monument in Ribas-Dominicci's honor, simulating an F-111, has been placed at the entrance of Utuado. Ribas-Dominicci's name is engraved in El Monumento de la Recordación (Spanish: Monument of Remembrance) dedicated to Puerto Rico's fallen soldiers and situated in front of the Capitol Building in San Juan, Puerto Rico.

Nathan Felix created an opera, called Ribas-Dominicci, which was performed in his honor. In the story, Ribas-Dominicci's wife, Blanca, hangs on to hope that her husband survived until his body is found.

== Awards and decorations ==
Among Major Ribas-Dominicci's military decorations were the following:

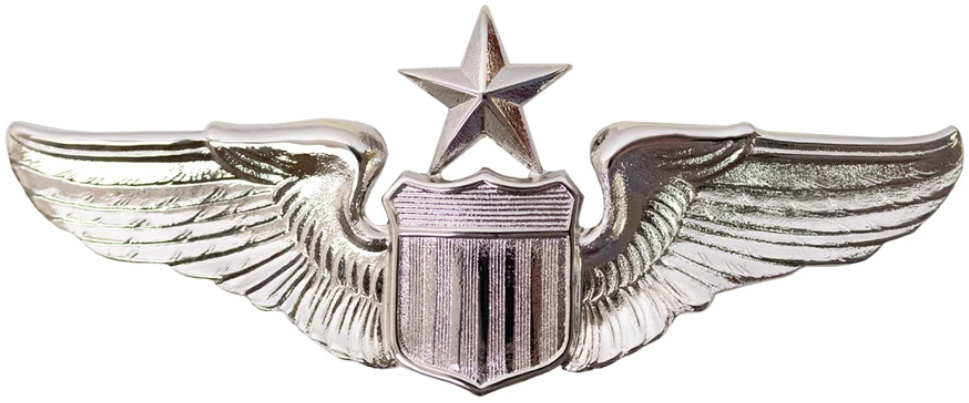

Badge	Senior Pilot Badge		
1st Row	Purple Heart		
2nd Row	Meritorious Service Medal	Air Medal	Air Force Commendation Medal
3rd Row	Air Force Outstanding Unit Award	Navy Meritorious Unit Commendation	National Defense Service Medal
4th Row	Armed Forces Expeditionary Medal	Air Force Overseas Long Tour Service Ribbon	Air Force Longevity Service Award
5th Row	Combat Readiness Medal w/ 1 bronze oak leaf cluster	Small Arms Expert Marksmanship Ribbon	Air Force Training Ribbon

== See also ==
- List of Puerto Ricans
- Corsican immigration to Puerto Rico
- List of Puerto Rican military personnel
- Hispanics in the United States Air Force
- University of Puerto Rico at Mayaguez people
