= Paul F. Lorence =

United States Air Force officer (1955–1986)

- Born: February 17, 1955; Oakland, California
- Died: April 15, 1986 (aged 31); Gulf of Sidra
- Military career
- Allegiance: United States of America
- Branch: United States Air Force
- Service years: 1972–1976; 1980–1986
- Rank: Captain
- Unit: 48th Tactical Fighter Wing
- Conflicts: 1986 Bombing of Libya
- Awards: Purple Heart; Air Medal

Paul F. Lorence (February 17, 1955 – April 15, 1986) was a captain in the United States Air Force (USAF). A weapon systems officer (WSO), he was killed when his General Dynamics F-111 Aardvark fighter-bomber, tail number 389 and callsign Karma 52, was shot down in action off the coast of Libya on April 15, 1986 during Operation El Dorado Canyon.

== Biography ==
Captain Lorence was a 1980 graduate of San Francisco State University, and was commissioned through Air Force ROTC. He completed USAF Undergraduate Navigator Training (UNT) and was assigned to the 48th Tactical Fighter Wing based at RAF Lakenheath, United Kingdom as an F-111 weapon systems officer (WSO).

On April 14, 1986, the United States launched Operation El Dorado Canyon, a U.S. bombing raid into Libya in response to terrorist attacks. During the raid, Capt. Lorence and his pilot, Capt. Fernando Ribas-Dominicci, were shot down off the coast of Libya becoming the only casualties of the entire operation. Capt. Ribas-Dominicci's body was eventually returned by the Libyan government in 1989, however the location of Capt. Lorence's remains is still currently unknown.

== Background ==
On April 14, 1986, in response to acts of terrorism then believed, and now confirmed, to have been sponsored by Libyan leader Colonel Gaddafi – in particular, the 1986 Berlin discotheque bombing of April 6 – and against the backdrop of heightened tension and clashes between the Libyan and U.S. navies over the disputed Gulf of Sidra, the United States launched a surprise attack on targets in Tripoli and other parts of Libya. Neither France nor Spain would agree to U.S. military aircraft overflying of their territory, so the 18 USAF F-111F fighter-bombers which took off from American air bases in the UK had to make a 1,300-mile (2,100 km) detour by following the Atlantic coast before cutting into the Mediterranean via the Straits of Gibraltar and Portugal to carry out their attack on Libya. An additional six F-111F aircraft had launched from RAF Lakenheath as airborne spares in the event of any type of malfunction. At a certain point in the flight, these six aircraft turned back to home station. In addition, the 18 F-111Fs were escorted by EF-111A Raven radar jamming aircraft which had launched from RAF Upper Heyford, United Kingdom. Numerous airborne Boeing KC-135 Stratotanker and McDonnell Douglas KC-10 Extender tanker aircraft were also part of the world's longest fighter mission along with other support aircraft. This package of aircraft which had departed the United Kingdom bound for Tripoli, Libya, was part of an overall coordinated strike mission with U.S. Navy aircraft going after targets in Benghazi, Libya, on the same evening.

Captain Lorence and his pilot, Major Fernando L. Ribas-Dominicci, were the only U.S. casualties in the bombing raid.

== Recovering the bodies ==
On December 25, 1988, Gaddafi offered to release the body of Capt. Lorence to his family through Pope John Paul II. But the body that was eventually handed over was identified by dental records as that of Capt. Ribas-Dominicci. According to the U.S government, Libya denies holding Lorence's remains.

In 1996, Lorence's childhood friend Theodore D. Karantsalis, a Miami-Dade County reference librarian, started a campaign seeking government assistance in locating and recovering the body by April 15, 2006, the 20th anniversary of his death.

Acting as his own attorney, Karantsalis filed a federal lawsuit on January 27, 2006, in Miami District Court against the United States Air Force and the United States Department of Defense. Karantsalis v. U.S. - Air Force, 1:06-cv-20223-ASG.

US District Judge Alan S. Gold presided over the case. In the discovery phase of court proceedings, Karantsalis deposed U.S. military officials at the U.S. Attorneys Miami office.

On November 17, 2006, the U.S. Department of Defense declassified and released documents relating to Operation El Dorado Canyon to Karantsalis. Karantsalis v. U.S. - Air Force, 1:06-cv-20223-ASG, U.S. District Court, Southern District of Florida (Miami).

Karantsalis's subsequent motion for court costs and fees was denied. Karantsalis is not an attorney licensed to practice law in the state of Florida.

== Awards and decorations ==

Badge	U.S. Air Force Senior Navigator/Observer Badge		
1st Row	Purple Heart		
2nd Row	Meritorious Service Medal	Air Medal	Air Force Outstanding Unit Award
3rd Row	Navy Meritorious Unit Commendation	Air Force Good Conduct Medal	Air Force Recognition Ribbon
4th Row	National Defense Service Medal	Armed Forces Expeditionary Medal	Air Force Overseas Long Tour Service Ribbon
5th Row	Air Force Longevity Service Award with two bronze oak leaf clusters	Small Arms Expert Marksmanship Ribbon	Air Force Training Ribbon with bronze oak leaf cluster

== Memorial ==
The names of Lorence and Ribas-Dominicci are engraved in the F-111 "Vark" Memorial Park located in Clovis, New Mexico. Both Lorence and Ribas-Dominicci were awarded the Purple Heart and Ribas-Dominicci was posthumously promoted to the rank of Major, effective April 15, 1986.

The San Francisco State University (SFSU) Department of History established the Paul Lorence Scholarship, honoring Lorence. Lorence graduated in 1980 from SFSU summa cum laude with a Bachelor of Arts degree in History.
