= 4450th Tactical Group =

Inactive United States Air Force unit

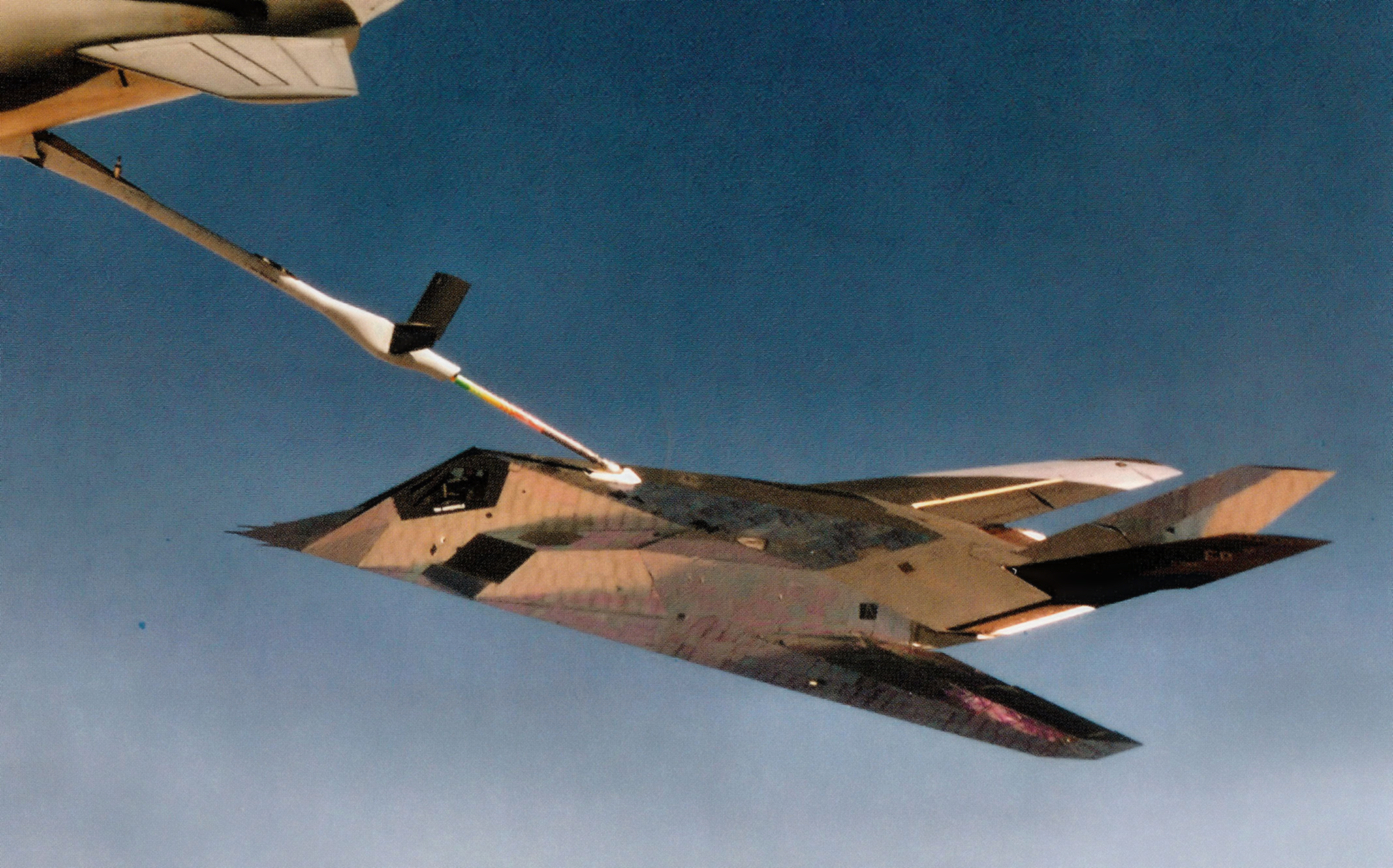
- Full Scale Development Aircraft Five (FSD-5), Lockheed F-117A Nighthawk 79-7084. being refueled by a KC-135 Stratotanker, July 1983
- Active: 15 October 1979 – 5 October 1989
- Country: United States
- Branch: United States Air Force
- Type: Group
- Role: Development of F-117A Nighthawk Stealth Fighter
- Part of: Tactical Air Command
- Garrison/HQ: Headquartered at: Nellis Air Force Base, Nevada, Operationally located at Tonopah Test Range Airport, Nevada
- Decorations: Air Force Outstanding Unit Award (3x) Awarded Air Force Association's David C. Schilling Award for 1988 for "breaking new ground in flight, operational planning, and tactical execution. "

Insignia
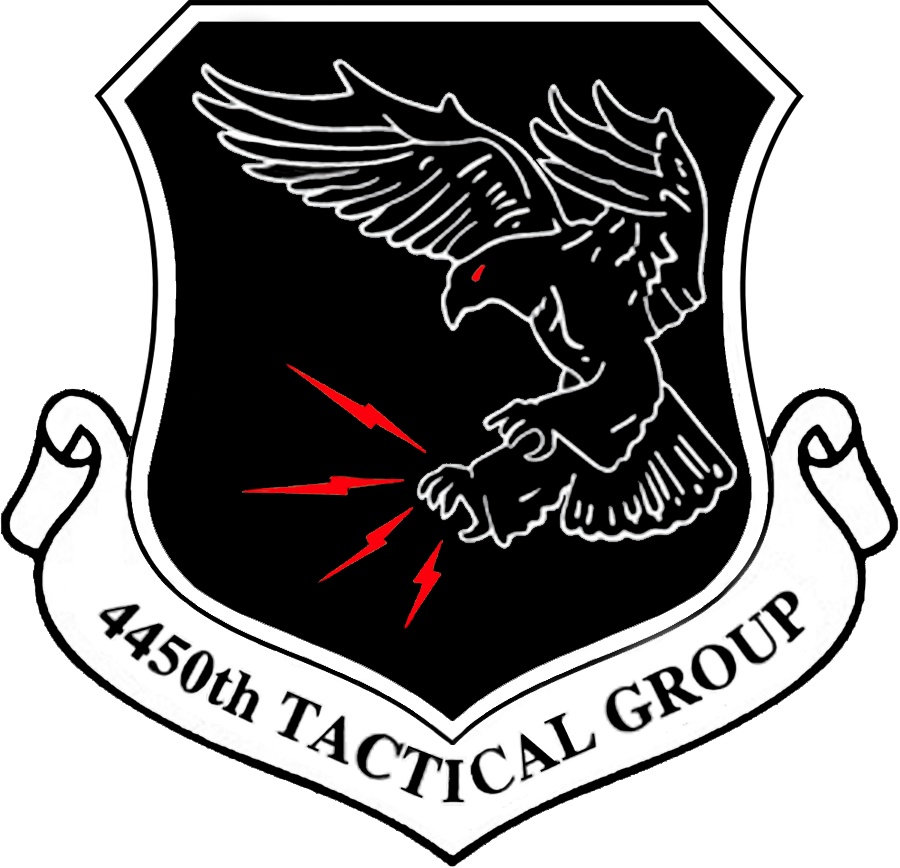
- 4450th Tactical Group emblem

The 4450th Tactical Group is an inactive United States Air Force unit. It was headquartered at Nellis Air Force Base, Nevada, and operationally located at Tonopah Test Range Airport, Nevada. It was inactivated on 5 October 1989.

The United States Air Force F-117A Stealth Fighter program began on 15 October 1979 with the activation of the Tactical Air Command 4450th Tactical Group (TG) at the Tonopah Test Range Airport, Nevada. The 4450th Tactical Group was a pathfinder unit, moving the F-117A from the research and development stage to becoming a fully operational weapons system.

On 10 November 1988, the Air Force officially announced the F-117A's existence to the public, and set the 4450th on the road to inactivation. On 5 October 1989, its F-117A aircraft, equipment personnel and mission were transferred to the 37th Tactical Fighter Wing was transferred from George Air Force Base, California, to carry out the F-117's sensitive worldwide mission.

== History ==
In 1978, the Air Force awarded a full-scale development contract for the YF-117A Nighthawk to Lockheed Corporation's Advanced Development Projects. On 17 January 1981 the Lockheed test team at Groom Lake accepted delivery of the first full Scale Development (FSD) prototype #79-780, designated YF-117A. At 6:05 a.m. on 18 June 1981, Lockheed Skunk Works test pilot Hal Farley lifted the nose of YF-117A #79-780 off the runway of Groom Lake.

=== Origins ===
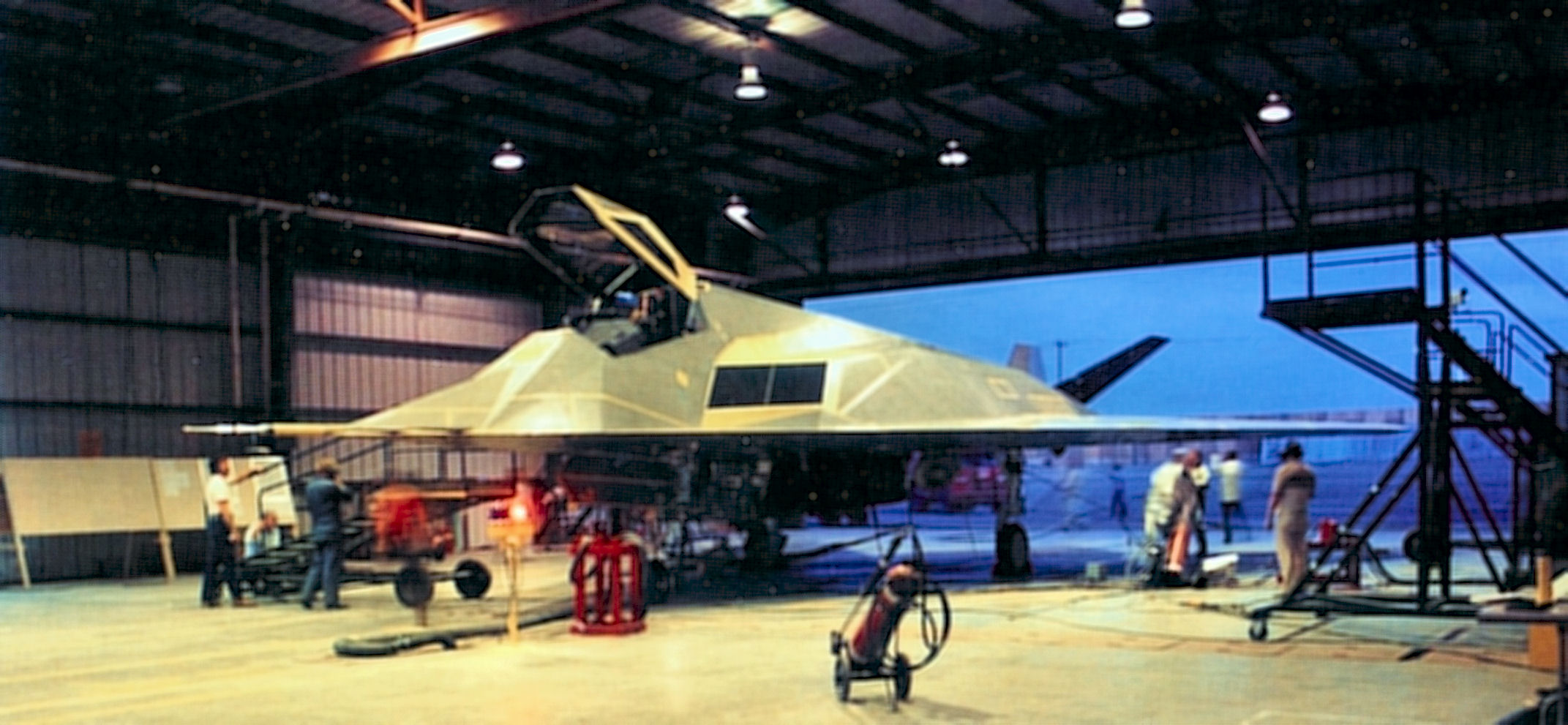
FSD-1, later F-117A 79-10780 inside a hangar prior to the first flight of the Nighthawk, June, 1981.

Meanwhile, Tactical Air Command (TAC) decided to set up a group-level organization to guide the F-117A to an initial operating capability. That organization became the 4450th Tactical Group (Initially designated "A Unit"), which officially activated on 15 October 1979 at Nellis AFB, Nevada. Its first home was an isolated corner of Nellis known as the Lake Mead Base, officially designated Nellis Area Two. Officially activated on 15 October 1979, by early 1980 a handful of officers and enlisted men recruited into the program and were told that they were laying the groundwork for a unit whose mission would be to run avionics tests and evaluations for A-7D Corsair II weapon systems.

Eight A-7D aircraft were transferred from England AFB, Louisiana in June 1981, which was converting to the A-10 Thunderbolt II. The A-7s were given the "LV" tailcode (for Las Vegas) and had a dark purple/black paint motif. The aircraft were assigned nominally to the 57th Fighter Weapons Wing and in addition, the group acquired the prototype A-7K two-seat dual control trainer from Edwards AFB (73-1008) that had been converted from its original A-7D configuration in 1978. In doing so, the group became the only active-duty unit to fly the A-7K. The first order of business was to set up acceptance procedures for the aircraft and develop an A-7D training program.

The A-7 had been chosen as an interim trainer because its cockpit layout and avionics were considered similar to those in the F-117. It was also a single-seat attack fighter, as the F-117 programmed to be. Training demands, however, soon forced the 4450th to delegate initial A-7D training and checkouts to the Arizona Air National Guard 162d Fighter Wing at Tucson, which was responsible for training Air National Guard pilots in the aircraft. Pilots assigned to the 4450th required a minimum of 1,000 fighter hours, and nearly all of the initial cadre for the F-117 were A-7D pilots due to the similar flight characteristics of the A-7D and F-117. Initially pilots in the program were sent to the 152nd Fighter Squadron, Arizona Air National Guard at Tucson for a quick refresher course in A-7Ds that included academics, simulator time and six or seven flights to re-qualify them in the Corsair. When other fighter pilots began to be assigned, they were assigned to either a three or six-month course. depending on their experience in fighters.

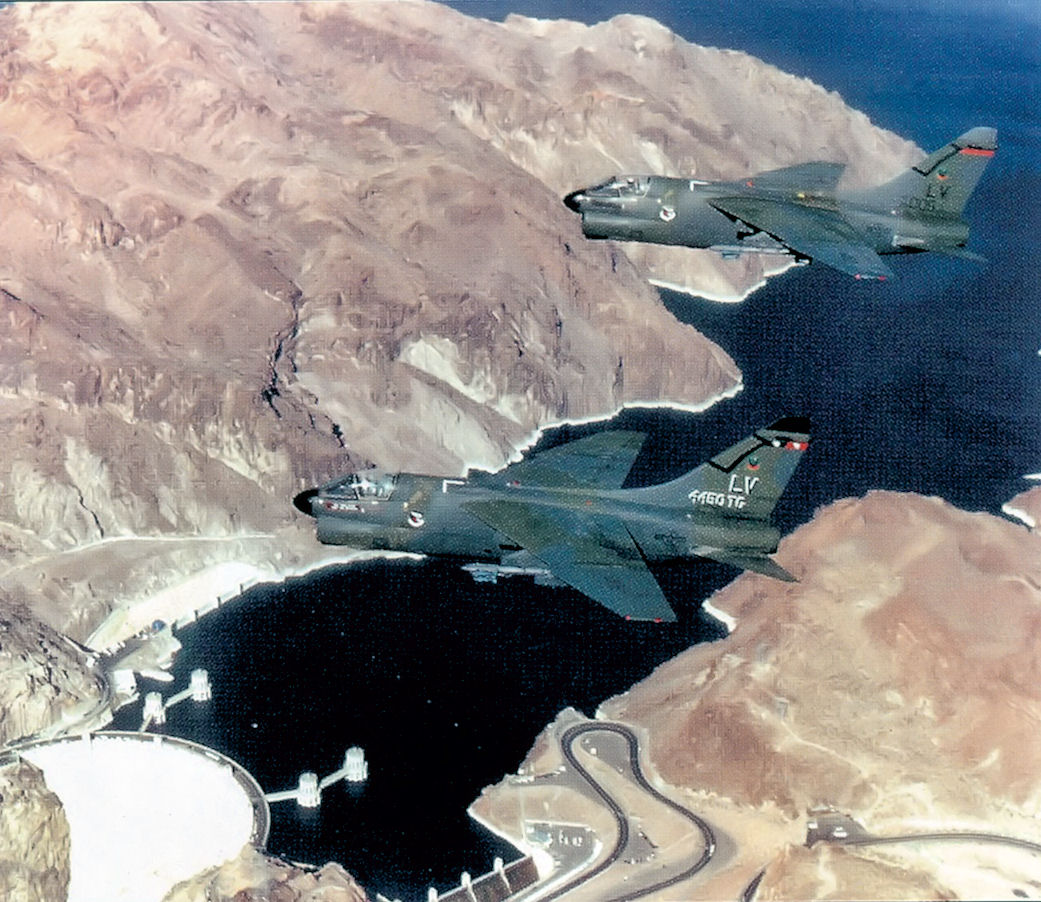
Two A-7D Corsair IIs of the 4450th TG Flying over Hoover Dam, 1986. Shown are 70–1006, the other being the 4450th TG Commander's aircraft

These operations continued at Nellis until 15 October 1982 under the guise of an avionics test mission when the Corsairs were moved north to Tonopah Test Range Airport to provide a cover story for the increased activities at the airport. Flying squadrons of the 4450th TG were the 4450th Tactical Squadron (Initially designated "I Unit") activated on 11 June 1981, and 4451st Tactical Squadron (Initially designated "P Unit") on 15 January 1983. The 4450th TS, stationed at Groom Lake, was the first F-117A squadron, while the 4451st TS was stationed at Nellis AFB and was equipped with A-7D Corsair IIs painted in a dark motif, tail coded "LV". Lockheed test pilots put the YF-117 through its early paces. A-7Ds was used for pilot training before any F-117A's had been delivered by Lockheed to Groom Lake, later the A-7D's were used for F-117A chase testing and other weapon tests at the Nellis Range

15 October 1982 is important to the program because on that date Major Alton C. Whitley, Jr. became the first 4450th TG pilot to fly the F-117A. Everyone aware of the top-secret flight waited with an expectancy reminiscent of the early space launches. Though Major Whitley could remember scrambling from an alert pad at night as a young lieutenant in South Vietnam, it is doubtful that he was any more keyed up in combat than he was on that night, sitting in an operational F-117A at the end of the runway. The flinty sparkle of the stars in the desert sky seemed to accentuate the vast blackness, reminding him that night operations were always scary. Finally cleared for takeoff, Major Whitley pushed the throttles forward and scanned the F-117's instruments for any warnings as the aircraft lumbered noisily down the runway. After passing the point of no return, he gripped the controls hard, willing the F-117 into the air. Then, as he climbed into the darkness, he thought about the small American flag he had stuffed into the pocket of his G-suit for this historic occasion. He would be the first Night Hawk to go aloft in an F-117. It would make a great story for his grandchildren. As far as Major Whitley could tell, his children might be grown before he could tell them about it.

=== Baja Scorpions ===
By early 1982, four more YF-117A airplanes were operating out of the southern end of the base, known as the "Southend" or "Baja Groom Lake." After finding a large scorpion in their offices, the testing team (Designated "R Unit") adopted it as their mascot and dubbed themselves the "Baja Scorpions." Testing of a series of ultra-secret prototypes continued at Groom Lake until mid-1981, when testing transitioned to the initial production of F-117 stealth fighters. The F-117s were moved to and from Groom Lake by C-5 under the cloak of darkness, in order to maintain program security. This meant that the aircraft had to be defueled, disassembled, cradled, and then loaded aboard the C-5 at night, flown to Lockheed, and unloaded at night before the real work could begin. Of course, this meant that the reverse actions had to occur at the end of the depot work before the aircraft could be reassembled, flight-tested, and redelivered, again under the cover of darkness. In addition to flight-testing, Groom performed radar profiling, F-117 weapons testing, and was the location for training of the first group of frontline USAF F-117 pilots.

Production FSD airframes from Lockheed were shipped to Groom Lake for acceptance testing. As the Baja Scorpions tested the aircraft with functional check flights and L.O. verification, the operational airplanes were then transferred to the 4450th TG.

The R-Unit was inactivated on 30 May 1989. Upon inactivation the unit was replaced by Detachment 1, 57th Fighter Weapons Wing (FWW). In 1990 the last F-117A (#843) was delivered from Lockheed. After completion of acceptance flights at Groom Lake of this last new F-117A aircraft, the flight test squadron continued flight test duties of refurbished aircraft after modifications by Lockheed. In February/March 1992 the test unit moved from Groom Lake to the USAF Plant 42 in Palmdale and was integrated with the Air Force Systems Command 6510th Test Squadron. Some testing, especially RCS verification and other classified activity was still conducted at Groom Lake throughout the operational lifetime of the F-117. The recently inactivated (2008) 410th Flight Test Squadron traces its roots, if not its formal lineage to the 4450th TG R-unit.

=== Tonopah Test Range Airport ===
Groom Lake was too small to be useful as the base for an operational unit. In addition, there were security concerns because an operational unit based at Groom Lake would involve many more people who could see things that they should not. Therefore, a new covert base had to be established for F-117 operations.

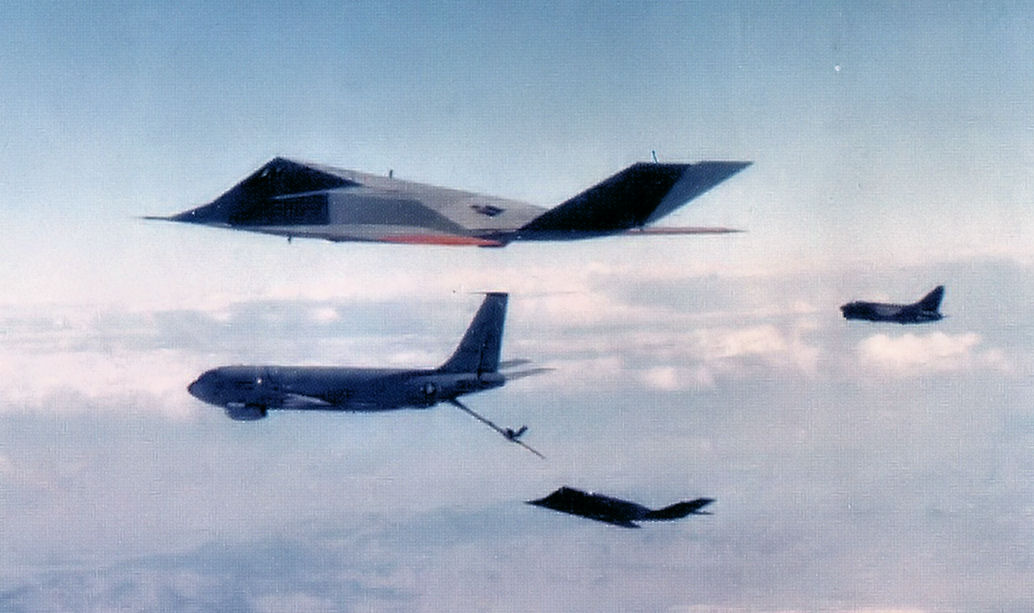
An F-117A and A-7D refueling over the Nevada desert

The USAF decided to build facilities at the Tonopah Test Range Airport. It was constructed in the 1950s, and during the 1960s and 1970s it was used for clandestine testing of acquired Soviet aircraft by the Tactical Air Command 4477th Test and Evaluation Squadron. The facility is not perfect from a security standpoint, since it is overlooked by public land and is 32 miles from the town of Tonopah. However, the security surrounding the Tonopah Test Range was effective. It was designated for the operations of the first USAF F-117 unit, the 4450th Tactical Group (TG).

Beginning in October 1979, the Tonopah Airport base was reconstructed and expanded for the F-117 mission. The 6,000 ft runway was lengthened to 10,000 ft. Taxiways, a concrete apron, a large maintenance hangar, and a propane storage tank were added.

On 17 May 1982, the move of the 4450th TG from Groom Lake to Tonopah was initiated, with the final components of the move completed in early 1983. The "Baja Scopion" unit remained at Groom Lake until the last production F-117 was delivered from Lockheed in July 1990. During the operational lifetime of the F-117, personnel from Tonopah and later Holloman AFB were temporarily deployed to Groom Lake for checkout flights of classified elements of the aircraft.

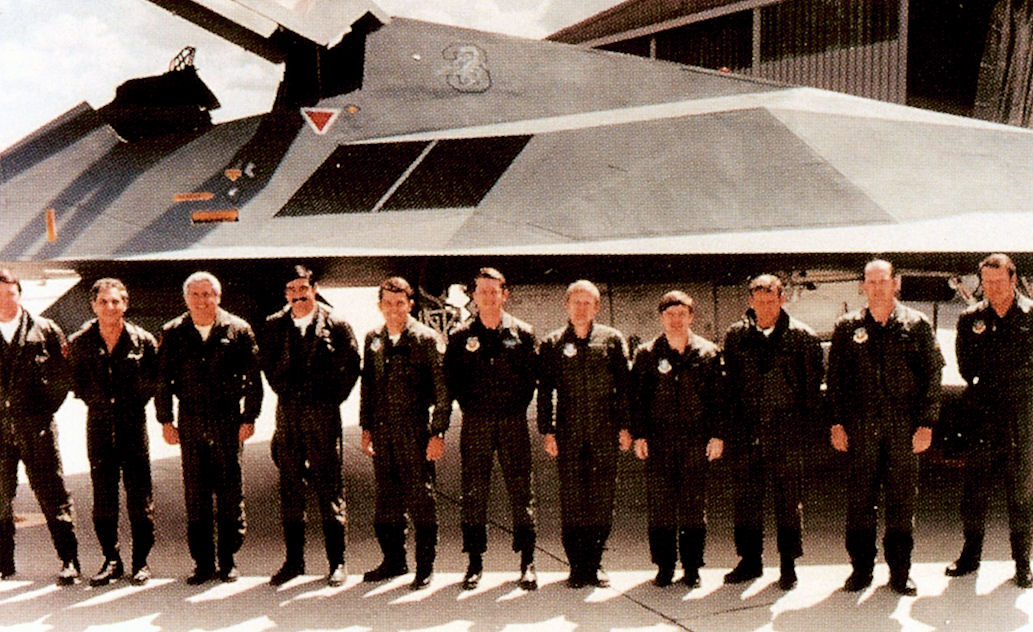
4450th Tactical Group test pilots stand in front of one of their F-117As

The 4450th achieved initial operational capability on 28 October 1983, with a total of 14 production F-117A aircraft on hand plus its A-7D trainers. A second group of nine A-7Ds were added to the squadron from Air National Guard squadrons along with a second A-7K trainer to accommodate the increasing number of pilots assigned to the F-117s. A total of approximately 20 A-7D aircraft used in developing the F-117, along with two A-7K trainers. The stealth fighter turned out to be easy to fly, and it was concluded that no two-seat trainer version was required. There was a ground-based training simulator.

To avoid having the 4450th's aircraft seen during the day by Soviet reconnaissance satellites, all F-117 flying took place at night. During the day, the aircraft were kept inside special hangars. Its A-7Ds were parked outside on the ramp, and training flights were flown during the day to deceive Soviet Intelligence about the true mission of Tonopah. Thus, the impression that activities there were only the cover story of avionics tests and evaluations involving some old A-7Ds, which was well known to Soviet intelligence.

Tonopah Airport continued to grow with more production F-117s being delivered from Lockheed and the size of the 4450th growing to accommodate mission requirements. New construction at the airport was split between two areas known as the Industrial Area and the Main Camp. Modern, two-story brick dorms were built. Eventually a recreation center was built, with a bowling alley, gymnasium, racquetball courts, and weight room, as well as a book and video library. Tonopah became much like any other isolated Air Force base, but it lacked dependents, and nights in the Man Camp were punctuated by the distant sound of jet aircraft taking off and landing.

Group personnel worked four days per week and would be flown to Tonopah either on Monday or Tuesday morning using Key Airlines contractor-provided Boeing 727 and later Boeing 737 passenger jets from Nellis AFB. On Thursday or Friday afternoons, the reverse would take place, leaving only essential personnel at Tonopah over the weekend. At Nellis, the passenger jets sitting at the flight line became a common sight. If the base personnel knew—and many of them did—that the contractor aircraft were there to ferry most of the 2,500 inhabitants of Tonopah to work, they didn't talk about it. It was part of what became known as the "Night Hawk spirit", the devotion to a secret worth keeping. It pervaded Tonopah and its sister base at Nellis, where thousands of family members knew not to ask where their loved ones went for four days each week. Due to the sensitive nature of being assigned to the 4450th, there were few transfers out of the unit once personnel were assigned. Airmen and Officers went through a thorough security investigation, far more than what airmen went through for "normal" assignments. OERs and APRs were reviewed, background investigations were conducted, and before an assignment was approved to the unit, each member's personnel and security file were reviewed and approved by the 4450th's commanding officer. Personnel signed security oaths, and in the case of a separation or transfer out of the unit, a through de-briefing was conducted to remind the personnel of the sensitive nature of the work they did and not to discuss any element of their assignment.

==== Beirut 1983 ====
During October 1983, the US government ordered the Department of Defense to plan an attack on the Palestine Liberation Organization (PLO) and PLO sympathizers/terrorists in Southern Lebanon in response to the destruction of the US Marine barracks at Beirut Airport. The Seventh Fleet in the Mediterranean was moved into position off the coast of Lebanon and the 4450th at Tonopah TTR was put on alert. Five to seven F-117A aircraft were armed and their Internal Navigation Systems aligned to targets in the area.

The plan called for the F-117As to fly from Tonopah TTR to Myrtle Beach AFB, South Carolina, where they would be put in hangars. They would wait 48 hours for the crew to rest and then fly the aircraft non-stop from Myrtle Beach to southern Lebanon. The attack was planned against positively identified locations of the terrorist groups that were known to be responsible for the car bomb and the deaths of 183 Marines of the peace keeping force in Beirut.

Caspar Weinberger, the Secretary of Defense, decided to scrub the mission just 45 minutes before the aircraft were to take off for Myrtle Beach. The F-117As were taken off alert, disarmed and had their INS systems reprogrammed for training purposes.

==== Operation Team Spirit 1984 ====
In early 1984 the P-unit A-7D's deployed to Kunsan Air Base, South Korea to participate in Team Spirit 1984. The word was purposely leaked that the 4450th TG A-7Ds were carrying supersecret atomic antiradar devices that would render the airplane invisible. To maintain the deception, each A-7D was outfitted with old napalm canisters painted black with a flashing red danger light in the rear. The canisters carried a radiation warning tag over an ominous-looking slot on which was printed: "Reactor Cooling Fill Port." When the 4450th TG deployed carrying these bogus devices, Air Police closed down the base and ringed the field with machine gun-toting jeeps. They forced all the runway personnel to turn their backs to the A-7s as they taxied past, and actually had them spread-eagled on the deck with their eyes closed until the 4450th TG A7s took off.

==== Operation El Dorado Canyon ====
By 28 February 1986 Lockheed had delivered 33 F-117As, giving the Air Force two operational squadrons of F-117As. During this time, Libya's Colonel Muammar al-Gaddafi had been challenging the US Navy for about a year and a half and had also sponsored a number of terrorist activities in Europe. After a few aerial incidents which resulted in the loss of a number of Libyan aircraft, and a terrorist attack in West Germany that was positively linked by the United States to Libya, the US government decided to strike back.

On 15 April 1986 a bombing raid was planned under the code name Operation El Dorado Canyon. The F-117A was identified as the best suited weapons system for the mission. Although senior officers at Tactical Air Command knew of the F-117A's capabilities, the theater commanders knew nothing of its capabilities or its existence. As a result, the raid was carried out using carrier based Navy A-6 Intruders, A-7 Corsair IIs, F/A-18 Hornets, and USAF F-111s assigned to the USAFE 48th TFW at RAF Lakenheath, England.

Once again, the F-117As were within less than one hour from launch when Caspar Weinberger scrubbed the mission. He felt that the aircraft was too valuable to risk on such insignificant targets and the F-117A's participation in the raid was canceled.

==== Crashes ====
The 4450th TG's mission continued to evolve under a cloak of secrecy, as all Tonopah training flights conducted at night under the cover of darkness until late 1988. With more production F-117s aircraft being delivered by Lockheed, the 4453d Test and Evaluation Squadron (TES) ("Z Unit") was activated on 4 October 1985 at Tonopah.

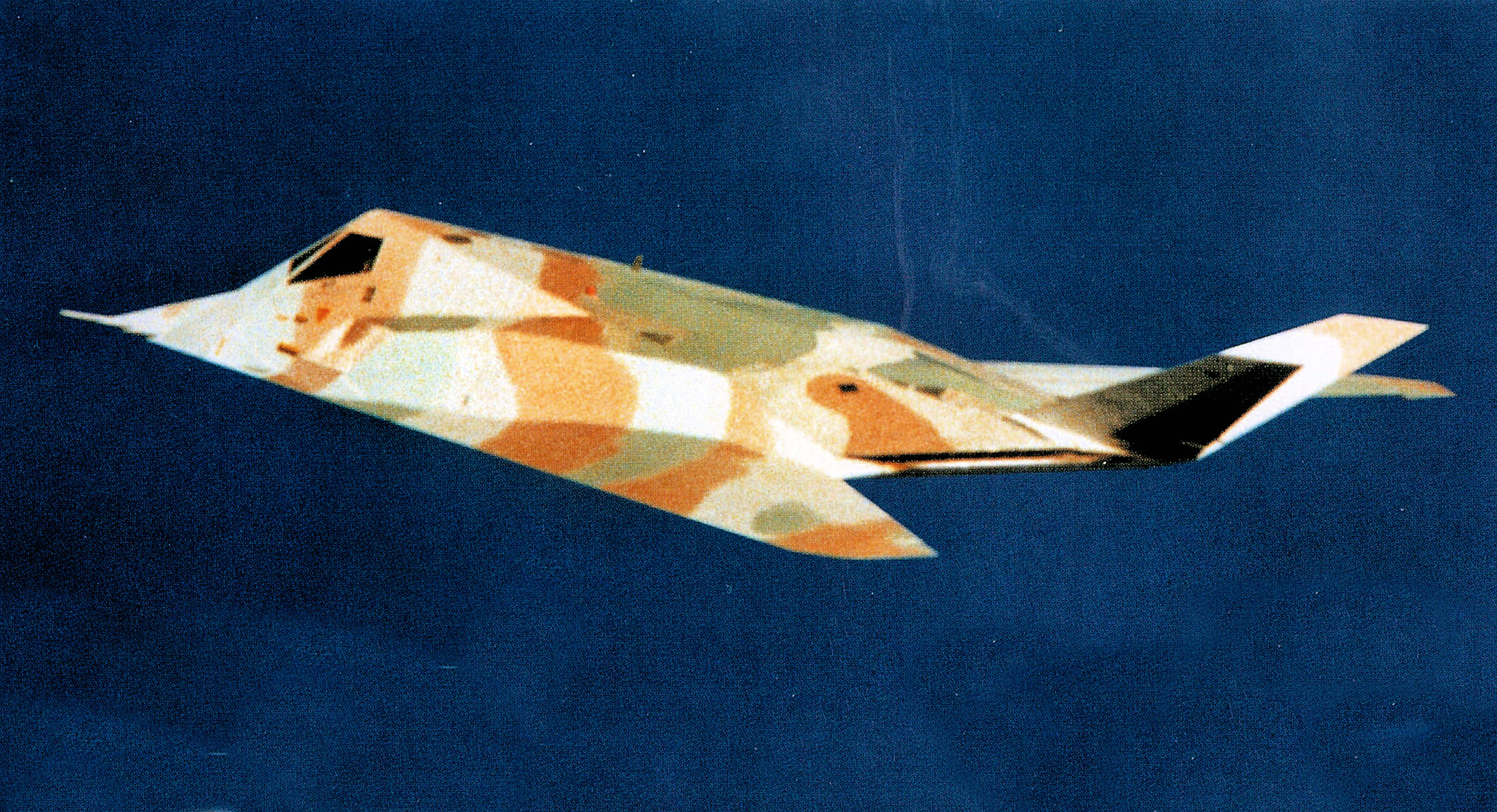
F-117A Nighthawk 79–10780 in a test flight testing a desert camouflage scheme.

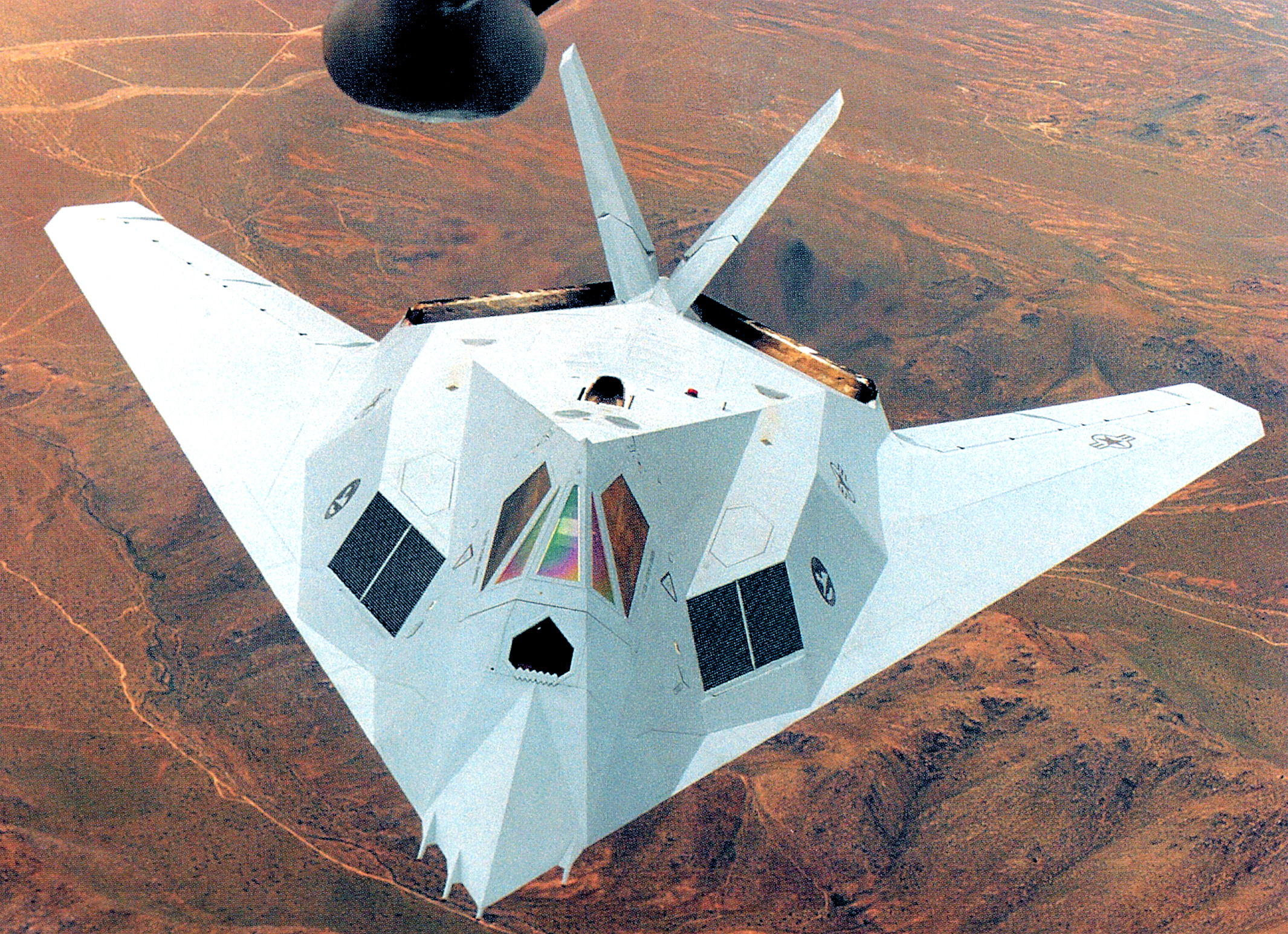
F-117A Nighthawk 79–7082 in experimental grey camouflage scheme. Later, this motif was used by the Air Force on the F-22 Raptor.

In the meantime, training continued out in the Nevada desert. On 11 July 1986, Major Ross E. Mulhare flew into a mountain near Bakersfield, California, while flying production aircraft number seven (81-10792). Major Mulhare seems to have made no attempt to eject and was killed instantly, his aircraft disintegrating upon impact. A recovery team was dispatched to the crash site, and the area was cordoned off. Every identifiable piece of the crashed plane was found and removed from the area to prevent them from falling into the wrong hands.

Some rather odd stories and rumors began to circulate about this incident in an attempt to explain the high amount of secrecy as well as to throw the media or the merely curious off the track. One cover story that appeared was that Major Mulhare was flying a Soviet MiG-23 when he crashed. There was a report that the recovery crew had dug and sifted the soil to a distance of 1,000 yards (910 m) from the last recognizable debris and to a depth of 6 feet (1.8 m) to make sure that no one snooping in the area would ever find any piece of the aircraft. Another story was that to mislead scavengers, the recovery crew had taken the remains of a crashed F-101A Voodoo that had been at Groom Lake for over 20 years, broken them up, and scattered them throughout the area. In an article not long afterward, The Washington Post quoted unnamed defense sources as saying that roughly 50 stealth aircraft were operational and combat-ready, although the true figure was about half that large. Within days, The Sacramento Bee published an article describing the base facilities at Tonopah.

On 14 October 1987, while flying production aircraft number 30 (tail number 84-0815), Major Michael C. Stewart crashed in the Nellis range just east of Tonopah. He apparently made no attempt to eject, and was killed instantly. The official cause was never revealed, but fatigue and disorientation may have played a role. There was no moon that night, and there were no lights on the Nellis range to help the pilot to distinguish the ground. Reportedly, the mission included certain requirements that were deleted from the final accident report. It is possible that Stewart was going supersonic when he crashed and that he had become disoriented during high-speed maneuvers and had simply flown his plane into the ground.

During the F-117A testing program, there were three A-7Ds lost in flight operations, one over the Nellis Range, one on a cross-country flight near Tinker AFB, Oklahoma, and a third which made headlines in the media when an A-7D (69-6207) crashed into a Ramada Inn at Indianapolis, and the media curiosity rose quickly when it was discovered that the pilot of the A-7 was assigned to the 4450th TG, identified as the home unit of the pilot killed in the publicly unexplained 1986 Bakersfield crash. Noting that the 4450th at Nellis apparently flew the only A-7Ds left in the active forces, a number of experts publicly speculated that the A-7Ds were being flown to sharpen pilot daytime attack skills, since it was widely rumored in the press that the Air Force stealth aircraft were known to fly only at night.

=== Security leaks ===
In 1979, public leaks about the stealth fighter began to appear in the aviation press, but at the time it was little more than gossip. During the summer of 1980, the pace of stealth leaks picked up. In the week of 10 August, Aviation Week and Space Technology, The Washington Post, and ABC News all carried stories on stealth. (Up to this point, the popular press had ignored stealth). The stories said that stealth technology was being developed for several types of aircraft, including bombers. They reported that it used RAM and curved surfaces to reduce the radar return.(The latter was entirely inaccurate).

1980 was an election year and on 22 August 1980, Defense Secretary Harold Brown held a press conference: "...I am announcing today a major technological advance of great military significance. This so-called 'stealth' technology enables the United States to build manned and unmanned aircraft that cannot be successfully intercepted with existing air defense systems. We have demonstrated to our satisfaction that the technology works". The Brown press conference set off a firestorm of charges by Republicans that the Carter Administration was using stealth technology to curry voters in the wake of the Iran Hostage Crisis and the failure of the Desert One rescue mission. However, the fact was that the public disclosure of the concept and possibilities of stealth aircraft, which few in the public and press could understand, did not change the outcome of the November 1980 election.

The incoming Reagan administration increased the secrecy surrounding the stealth program. Although several projects would remain unknown for a decade and more, the effort was not entirely successful with the stealth fighter. In large part to the 1980 announcement by Secretary Brown, aerospace circles published speculative articles, By 1983, artists' conceptions of the "F-19" began to appear (F-19 was the speculative name of the aircraft, since the F-18 designation was the Navy derivative of the F-17, and Northrop used the F-20 designation for its privately funded F-5E Tiger II replacement). The general pattern was a long SR-71-like fuselage, elliptical wings at the rear, a bubble canopy, canards, and twin inward-canted fins. As it was now known the SR-71 had a reduced RCS, it was assumed the "F-19 Stealth Fighter" was similar. Among those following the stealth story was the Testor Corporation. In 1985, they began work on a conceptual model of the F-19 which appeared in stores.

=== Declassification ===
Although the erroneous reports effectively hid the true information, it was clear that the wall of secrecy around the F-117A was breaking down. On 22 August 1986, a story in The Washington Post said that about fifty aircraft were operational, that the F-19 designation was incorrect, and that the plane was described as "ugly" due to its bulging, nontraditional shape. The plane's base was also identified as being Tonopah Airport. In January 1988, Armed Forces Journal revealed the aircraft's actual designation was the F-117 Nighthawk. More important, the "big secret" of stealth, faceting, was starting to leak out. In 1986, there were reports that the F-19 was not smooth, but rather had "a multi-faceted outer-body surface" and a "cut-diamond exterior". This was described as being thousands of flat surfaces, none more than eight square inches in size, which did not share the same "reflectivity angle." The F-117A actually used large panels, but the basic principle was the same.

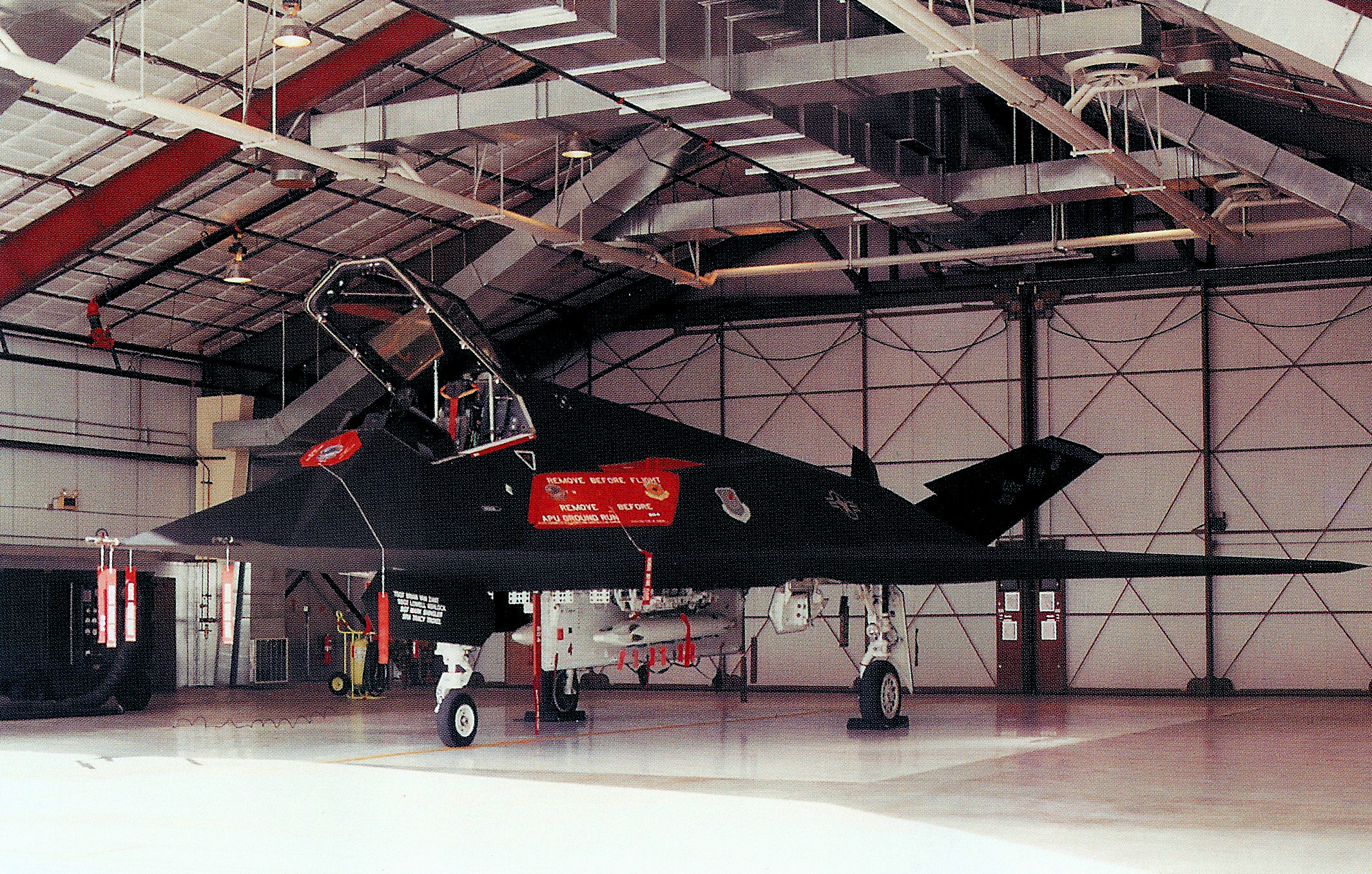
F-117A Nighthawk 79-7084 shown in a hangar at Nellis AFB, Nevada, while attached to the 57th Fighter Weapons Wing (Detachment 1).

Bringing the F-117A out of the Black would have a number of advantages. The plane could be used in Red Flag exercises and could become part of standard war planning. There were benefits for the pilots too. With daylight flights possible, the fatigue from the late hours would be lessened. Night flights could start earlier and not have to race with the dawn. This would make the pilots' home lives easier. The problem was, ironically, that 1988 was also a presidential election year, and pressure from Congress forced the Air Force to wait until after the November election to officially announce the F-117's existence (harking back to the 1980 stealth announcement).

On 10 November 1988, the Air Force brought the F-117A from behind a "black veil" by publicly acknowledging its existence, but provided few details about it. The press release stated that the F-117A was assigned to the 4450th Tactical Group at Nellis Air Force Base, Nevada. The aircraft was based at the Tonopah Test Range Airport in Nevada. It also contained the facts that the first flight had been made in June 1981, that three had crashed, and that fifty-two had been delivered out of a total of fifty-nine ordered from Lockheed. A single photo was also released. The angular shape came as a surprise to the press and the public, as did the out-of-sequence "century-series" designation. No information was given out as to the F-117A's dimensions, cost, range, or speed.

The official confirmation of the F-117A's existence, however, had little impact on Tonopah operations. Pilots began occasionally flying the F-117A during the day, but base personnel were still ferried to and from work each Monday and Friday from Nellis. Everyone associated with the project was still forbidden to talk about what they did for a living, and the program remained shrouded in secrecy.

=== Inactivation ===
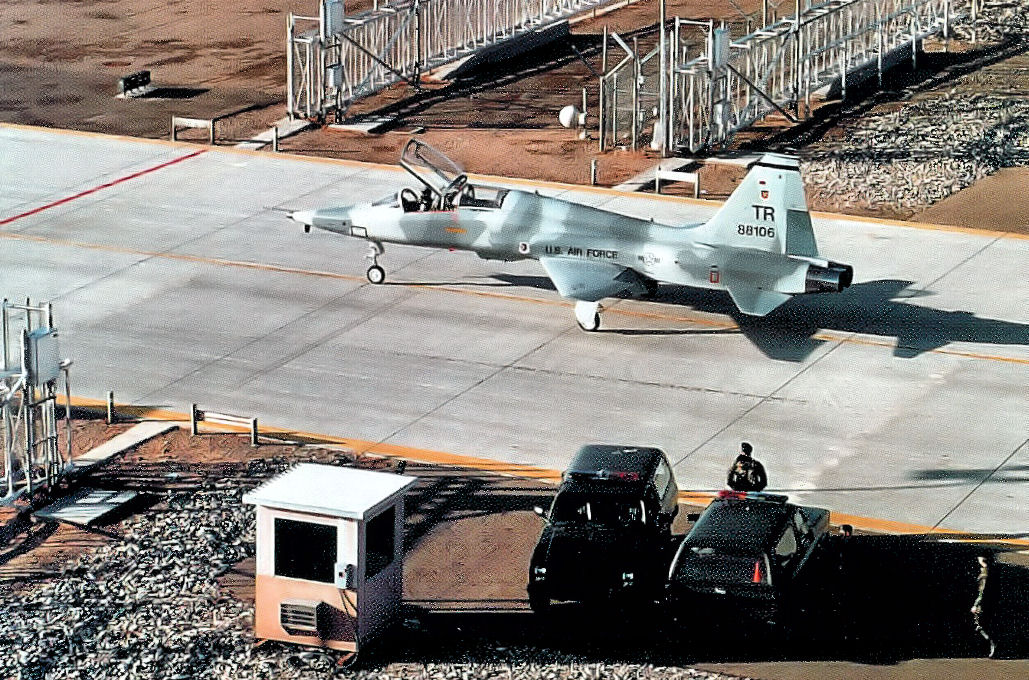
T-38 Talon 68–8016 at Tonopah Airport T-38s replaced the A-7Ds in early 1989 after the public announcement of the F-117A's existence.

In January 1989, the AT-38 Talon replaced the A-7D in the unit's inventory as a measure to streamline the F-117A's training operation, and the squadrons A-7Ds were transferred to several Air National Guard squadrons. The A-7Ks were transferred to the Arizona Air National Guard at Tucson for use at the ANG A-7 training school there.

With the 1988 public announcement of the existence of the F-117A program, the formerly clandestine 4450th Tactical Group, which had transitioned the F-117 from a development to operational weapons system was put on the road to inactivation when the Air Force decided to increase the 4450th TG to a Wing level organization. As part of the phasedown of operations at George AFB, California, the 37th Tactical Fighter Wing was reassigned, without equipment or personnel to Tonopah Test Range Airport on 5 October 1989, and assumed the aircraft, personnel, equipment and mission of the provisional 4450th Tactical Group.

As part of the transition from the provisional group to 37th TFW, the F-117A squadrons were inactivated and re-designated as follows:

- 4450th Tactical Squadron (Nightstalkers-Atlantic); re-designated as: 415th Tactical Fighter Squadron (Nightstalkers)
- 4451st Tactical Squadron (Grim Reapers-Pacific); re-designated as: 416th Tactical Fighter Squadron (Ghostriders)
- 4453d Test and Evaluation Squadron; re-designated as: 417th Tactical Fighter Squadron (Bandits)

The choice of the 415th, 416th and 417th Tactical Fighter Squadrons were significant, as these were all P-61 Black Widow, night fighter squadrons in World War II. The squadron designations were chosen to honor these pioneering squadrons, which were bestowed their lineages and histories

Tactical Air Command also activated Detachment 1, 57th Fighter Weapons Wing (The Dragon Test Team) on 30 May 1989 at Tonopah, which took over the mission of the R-Unit (Baja Scorpions).

Before inactivating, the 4450th Tactical Group achieved many noteworthy accomplishments. The unit passed two Tactical Air Command operational readiness inspections (ORI) and unit effectiveness inspections (UEIs) with high marks. The 4450th was awarded three Air Force Outstanding Unit Awards (AFOUA) for its achievements, 1 January 1987 – 31 December 1988; 1 January 1984 – 31 December 1985; and 29 October 1981 – 28 October 1983

=== Lineage ===
- Established by Tactical Air Command as the 4450th Tactical Group (A-unit) and activated on 15 October 1979.

Inactivated on 5 October 1989.

=== Assignments ===
- Direct reporting unit to Tactical Air Command Deputy Chief of Staff for Operations (TACDO), 15 October 1979 – 5 October 1989

On 1 April 1985, administrative control only was transferred to the USAF Tactical Fighter Weapons Center at Nellis AFB

=== Units ===
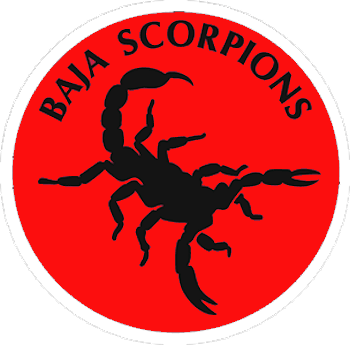
"Baja Scorpions" emblem

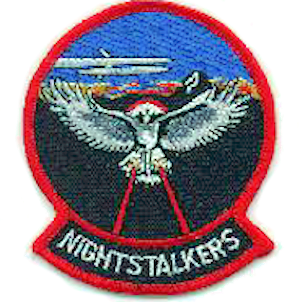
4450th Tactical Squadron ("I" Unit)

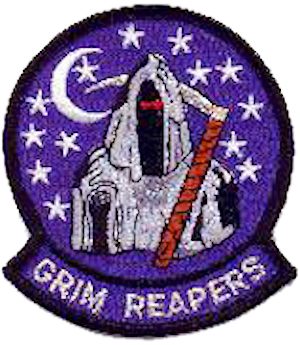
4451st Tactical Squadron ("P" Unit)

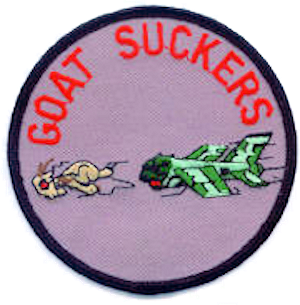
4452nd Tactical Squadron ("Q" Unit)

Operations Units

- 4450th Test (later Tactical) Squadron (I-Unit), 11 July 1981 – 5 October 1989 "Nightstalkers – Atlantic"

F-117A Testing Squadron
Re-designated: 415th Tactical Fighter Squadron (37th TFW)

- 4451st Test (later Tactical) Squadron (P-Unit), 15 January 1983 – 5 October 1989 "Grim Reapers – Pacific"

The P-unit was the Nellis based unit equipped with A-7D Corsair IIs. These aircraft were used for initial pilot training before any F-117A's were delivered, then later being used for F-117A chase tests and other weapon tests at the Nellis Range.
Re-designated: 416th Tactical Fighter Squadron (37th TFW)

- 4453d Test and Evaluation Squadron (Z-Unit), 1 October 1985 – 30 May 1989 "Bandits"

F-117A Testing Squadron
Re-designated: 417th Tactical Fighter Training Squadron (37th TFW)

- 4450th Tactical Group, Detachment 2 (R-Unit), 15 October 1979 – 30 May 1989

Located at Groom Lake, Nevada. The R-unit flew the initial checkout flights of every newly produced F-117A aircraft before USAF acceptance. An extra duty of the R-unit included local area familiarization function later assigned to the 4453rd TES upon the R-unit's inactivation. Upon inactivation the unit was replaced by Detachment 1, 57th Fighter Weapons Wing (FWW). The 410th Flight Test Squadron traces its roots, if not its formal lineage to the R-unit.

Support Units

- 4450th Tactical Group, Detachment 1

Oldest Unit in 4450th TG
Re-designated: 4452d Test Squadron (Q-Unit), 15 October 1979 – 30 May 1989

- 4450th Tactical Group, Detachment 3 (W-Unit), 15 October 1979 – 30 May 1989

Intelligence unit

- 4450th Tactical Group, Detachment 4 (S-Unit), 15 October 1979 – 30 May 1989

Hospital unit

- 4450th Maintenance Squadron (T-Unit), 11 June 1981 – 30 May 1989

Performed the maintenance on the 4450th A-7D and A-7K aircraft

- Activated as H-Unit, 15 April 1982

Re-designated 4461st Supply Squadron, 15 May 1984
Re-designated 4450th Supply Squadron (undetermined)-5 October 1989
Performed Inventory Management missions

- 4450th Transportation Squadron (L-Unit), 15 April 1982 – 5 October 1989

Transportation unit

- 4452d Maintenance Squadron (G-Unit), 15 October 1979

Re-designated 4450th Aircraft Generation Squadron, 30 May 1989 – 5 October 1989
Performed F-117 maintenance

- 4451st Maintenance Squadron (F-Unit), 11 June 1981

Later re-designated 4450th Component Repair Squadron, 30 May 1989 – 5 October 1989
Performed F-117 maintenance

- 4454th Maintenance Squadron (U-Unit), 15 October 1979 – 30 May 1989

Maintenance unit

- F3XP M.A.R.S./4450th TG M.A.R.S. (Materials Application Repair Section)

Applied and maintained the coatings used on the F-117A

- 4461st Support Group (E-Unit), 15 October 1979

Re-designated: 4450th Combat Support Group, 15 September 1981
Inactivated on 5 October 1989.

4461st Support (later Combat Support) Squadron
4461st Security Police (later Security) Squadron
4461st Civil Engineering Squadron

On 15 September 1981, Headquarters TAC activated the 4461st Support Group and assigned it to the USAF Tactical Fighter Weapons Center (TFWC) at Nellis AFB to support "new activities programmed on the Northern Range Complex." This unit received as its first mission a task to design and construct a full-service base that would support the F-117A Stealth Fighter program. As such, the 4461st developed long-range construction programs to meet future expansions and provide base operating support services to all units and people at the Tonopah Test Range. As a goal, the 4461st had to complete this work by 1 November 1983 to coincide with the F-117A's planned initial operating capability (IOC).

On 1 April 1985, Headquarters TAC reassigned the 4461st to the 4450th Tactical Group. This status did not change until 24 January 1989, when TAC re-designated the 4461st Support Group as the 4450th Combat Support Group to reflect its true role in supporting the 4450th Tactical Group's operational mission with F-l17As, A-7Ds, and T-38s. On 5 October 1989, the 4450th CSG inactivated, and all assigned personnel and assets transferred into the newly activated 37th Combat Support Group.

=== Stations ===
- Nellis AFB, Nevada, 15 October 1979 – 5 October 1989 (Headquarters)

Operational Locations

Detachment 3, Air Force Flight Test Center, Nevada, 15 October 1979 – 28 October 1983
Tonopah Test Range Airport, Nevada, 28 October 1983 – 5 October 1989

=== Aircraft ===
- F-117A Nighthawk, 1981–1989
- A-7 Corsair II (A-7D/A-7K), 1981–1989

Used as a surrogate aircraft for training and practice and to provide a cover story for the 4450th TG's existence.

- T-38 Talon, 1989

Replacements for A-7s after existence of F-117A became publicly known.
