= William C. Chasey =

American writer and inventor (1940–2015)

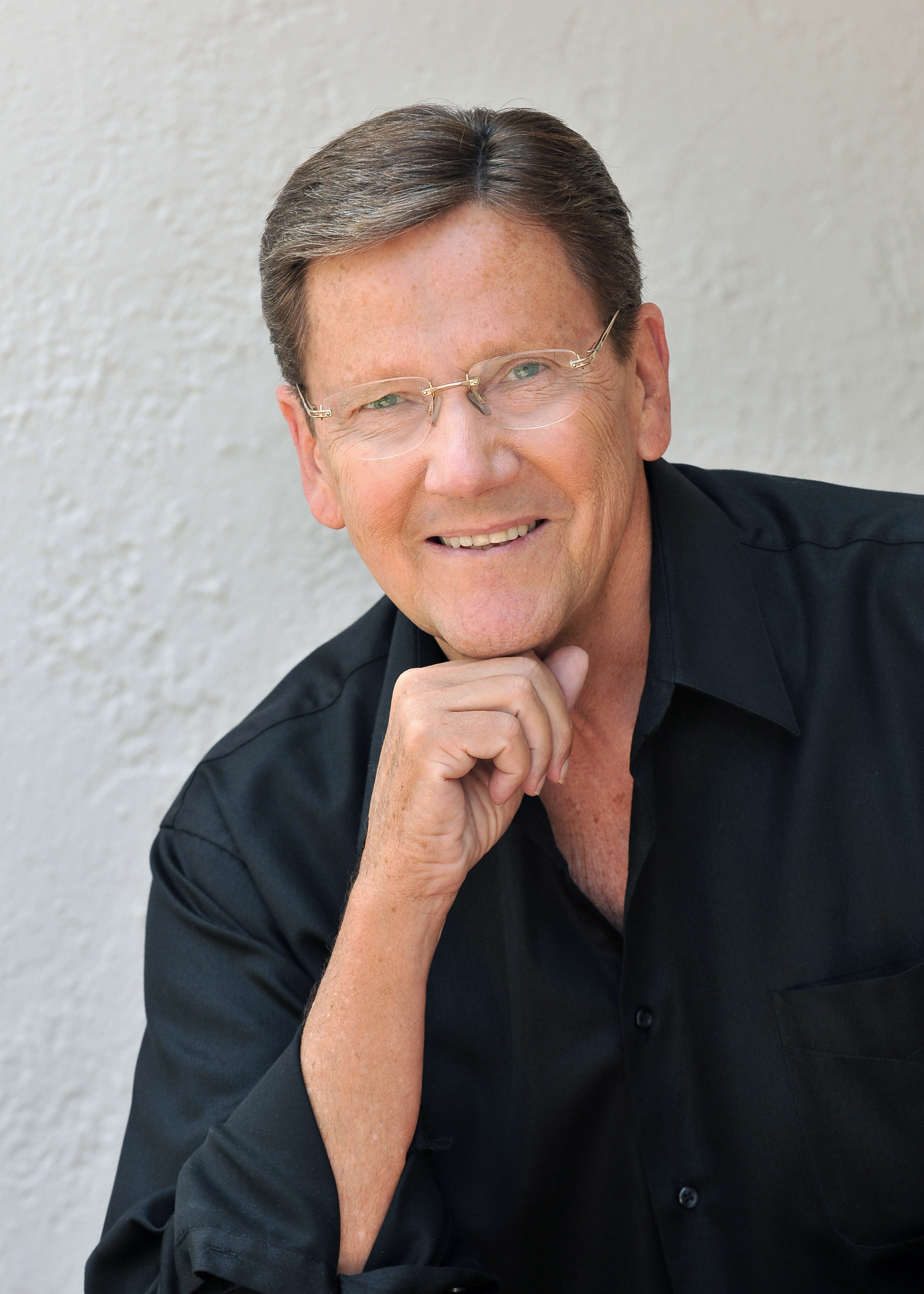

Personal details
- Born: February 11, 1940 New Jersey
- Died: May 23, 2015 (aged 75) San Diego, California
- Education: Springfield College (B.S.); East Carolina University (M.A.); University of Maryland (Ph.D.)
- Profession: Educator, lobbyist

Military service
- Branch/service: United States Marine Corps
- Years of service: 1958–1965
- Rank: First Lieutenant

William Carmen "Bill" Chasey (February 11, 1940 - May 23, 2015) was an American educator and educational scientist, as well as a lobbyist and campaign advisor to President Ronald Reagan.

== Early life and education ==
Chasey was raised in Trenton, New Jersey, the son of William Carmen Chasey and Hazel Marie Chasey. Chasey attended public schools in Trenton, New Jersey, and graduated from Pennsbury High School in Fairless Hills, Pennsylvania. He received his B.S. degree in physical education from Springfield College (Massachusetts) in 1962. Chasey received his M.A. degree in education from East Carolina University in 1965 while serving as a Marine Corps Officer at the Marine Corps Base Camp Lejeune, North Carolina. Chasey received his Ph.D. degree from the University of Maryland in 1969 while serving as an instructor at the university. His academic concentration was the psychomotor development of intellectually disabled children. Chasey was awarded an LH.D, Doctor of Humane Letters, (honoris causa) Literarum Humanarum Doctor, Honorary Doctorate, (Humanitarian Excellence), from National University (California) in 1985 for his work in lobbying the Central American Peace Plan through the US Congress.

== Academic career ==
Chasey held the John F. Kennedy Professorship at the Peabody College of Education and Human Development of Vanderbilt University, (Named Academic Professorship funded by the Joseph P. Kennedy Jr. Foundation, Washington, D.C.) Chasey was a research scientist in the Convulsive Disorders Clinic of the Vanderbilt University School of Medicine. He was a senior scientist in the Institute on Mental Retardation and Intellectual Development (IMRID), and a senior scientist in the Laboratory of Intrinsic Motivation, and as chairman of the Research Ethics Committee at the Peabody College of Education and Human Development of Vanderbilt University 1972–1975.

== Military service ==
Chasey joined the United States Marine Corps in 1958 during his freshman year in college. He trained during his college summers to become a Marine Corps Officer at the Marine Base in Quantico, Virginia. Upon his graduation from college, he was commissioned a second lieutenant and attended the Officers Basic School at the Quantico Marine Base, from June, 1962 to December 1962. He graduated with a Military Occupational Specialty of Infantry Officer (0302) United States military occupation code. Chasey served as an infantry platoon commander, with the 2nd Anti-Tank Battalion, Second Marine Division, at Camp Lejeune, North Carolina. He deployed to the Caribbean in 1963 with the 3rd Battalion, 6th Marine Regiment as part of Battalion Landing Team 3/6. In 1964, he was transferred to the 2nd Marine Division Headquarters to organize and direct the All-Marine Corps Boxing Championships. He was promoted to the rank of 1st lieutenant in 1963.

Chasey was awarded the National Defense Service Medal for honorable active military service during the time of war or conflict as a member of the United States Armed Forces, (Vietnam War Period). He received an honorable discharge in May 1965.

== Political campaigns ==
During 1979–80, Chasey served as director of domestic policy for John B. Connally's presidential campaign. He was a traveling advisor to Gov. Connally in presidential primary and caucus states. When Governor Connally withdrew from the race, Chasey became a principal advisor to the 1980 presidential campaign of Ronald Reagan and George H. W. Bush.

Chasey created and directed the first nationwide Christian voter registration program for Candidate Ronald Reagan. He helped write all of Reagan's campaign position statements and speeches for church groups and religious organizations. He helped select Reagan's campaign appearances and accompanied him to all religious events during the campaign. He arranged meetings for candidate Reagan with major church and evangelical leaders throughout the country.

He was a key fundraiser for the 1988 presidential campaign of George H. W. Bush. Over the course of 25 years as a Washington lobbyist, Chasey advised and raised campaign funds for numerous campaigns for governor, House of Representatives and the United States Senate.

== Author ==
Chasey's first two successful non-fiction books, Foreign Agent 4221, and Pan Am 103, the Lockerbie Cover-up, drawn from personal experience, tell the story of Chasey's attempt to normalize relations between the U.S. and Libya over the bombing of Pan Am 103 over Lockerbie, Scotland in 1988. He concludes that the PanAm bombing was wrongfully attributed to the Muammar Gaddafi government and was, in fact, the work of Syria and Iran in response to the USS Vincennes incident.

'Truth Never Dies: The Bill Chasey Story,' Chasey's third book, was a 2012 Pulitzer Prize in Literature entrant, and is also drawn from personal experience. It tells of his efforts to help normalize relations between the U.S. and the Government of Libya.

== Personal life ==
Chasey was married to Virginia Chasey, his wife of 33 years. He had two daughters from a previous marriage. He and Virginia had one daughter. Late in his life, Chasey contracted multiple myeloma and leukemia. After contending with his illness for six years, he died in San Diego, California and was interred at Miramar National Cemetery.
