= RAF Lakenheath =

Royal Air Force station in Suffolk, England

RAF Lakenheath
- Near Brandon, Suffolk in England
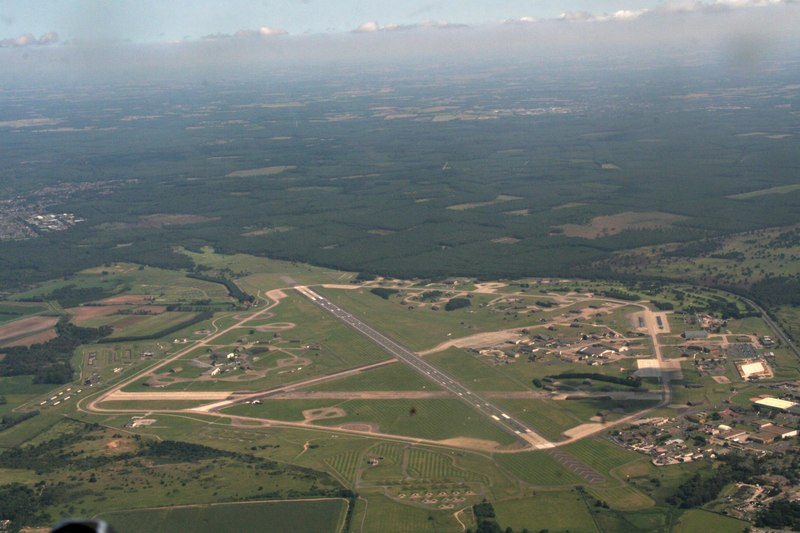
- An aerial view of RAF Lakenheath

Site information
- Type: RAF station (US Visiting Forces)
- Owner: Ministry of Defence
- Operator: United States Air Force
- Controlled by: United States Air Forces in Europe - Air Forces Africa
- Open to the public: No
- Condition: Operational
- Website: www.lakenheath.af.mil

Location
- Location within Suffolk Location within the United Kingdom Location within Europe
- Coordinates: 52°24′30″N 00°33′24″E
- Grid reference: TL740820
- Area: 727 hectares (1,800 acres)

Site history
- Built: 1940
- In use: 1941–1944 (Royal Air Force); 1948–present (US Air Force)

Garrison information
- Current commander: Brigadier General Jack R. Arthaud
- Garrison: 48th Fighter Wing: 492nd Fighter Squadron, 493rd Fighter Squadron, 494th Fighter Squadron, 495th Fighter Squadron, 372nd Training Squadron, Field Training Detachment 16

Airfield information
- Identifiers: IATA: LKZ, ICAO: EGUL, WMO: 03583
- Elevation: 10 metres (33 ft) AMSL
Runways
Direction	Length and surface
05/23	2,743 metres (8,999 ft) x 46 metres (151 ft) Concrete/Asphalt

Royal Air Force Lakenheath or RAF Lakenheath (IATA: LKZ, ICAO: EGUL) is a Royal Air Force station near the village of Lakenheath in Suffolk, England, 4.7 miles (7.6 km) north-east of Mildenhall and 8.3 miles (13.4 km) west of Thetford. The installation's perimeter borders Brandon.

Despite being an RAF station, Lakenheath currently only hosts United States Air Force (USAF) units and military personnel. The host wing is the 48th Fighter Wing (48 FW), also known as the Liberty Wing, assigned to United States Air Forces in Europe - Air Forces Africa (USAFE-AFAFRICA). The wing operates the F-15E Strike Eagle and the F-35A Lightning II.

== History ==
=== First World War ===
The first use of Lakenheath Warren as a Royal Flying Corps airfield was during the First World War, when the area was made into a bombing and ground-attack range for aircraft flying from RFC Feltwell and RFC Thetford.

=== Second World War ===
In 1940, the Air Ministry selected Lakenheath as an alternative for nearby RAF Mildenhall and used it as a decoy airfield. Surfaced runways were constructed in 1941, with the main runway being 3,000 feet (910 m), and the two subsidiary runways at 2,000 feet (610 m).

In late 1941, Lakenheath was used by RAF flying units on detachment. The station soon functioned as a Mildenhall satellite base with Short Stirling bombers of No. 149 Squadron dispersed from the parent airfield as conditions allowed. The squadron exchanged its Vickers Wellingtons for Stirlings late in November 1941. After becoming fully operational with its new aircraft, the squadron moved into Lakenheath on 6 April 1942 and remained until mid 1944 when the squadron moved the short distance to RAF Methwold, just inside Norfolk.

One Stirling pilot, Flight Sergeant Rawdon Middleton, was posthumously awarded the Victoria Cross for valour on the night of 28–29 November 1942, when despite serious face wounds and loss of blood from shell-fire during a raid on the Fiat works at Turin in Italy, he brought the damaged aircraft back towards southern England. With fuel nearly exhausted his crew were ordered to bail out.

On 21 June 1943, newly re-formed No. 199 Squadron re-located to RAF Lakenheath as a second Stirling squadron. It conducted mine laying operations at sea before moving to RAF North Creake in Norfolk on 1 May 1944. No. 149 Squadron ended its association with RAF Lakenheath the same month, taking its Stirlings to RAF Methwold. The reason for the departure of the two bomber squadrons was Lakenheath's selection for upgrading to a Very Heavy Bomber airfield, which left the airfield closed to aircraft until April 1947.

==== Strategic Air Command ====
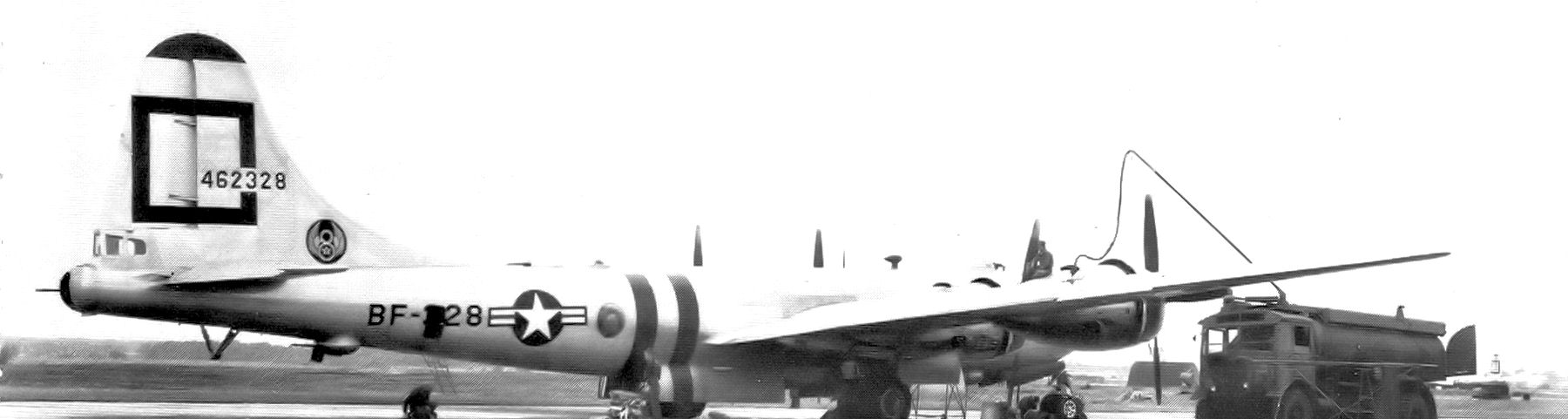
A 307th Bombardment Group Boeing B-29A-75-BN Superfortress at RAF Lakenheath, England during the Berlin Airlift, 1948

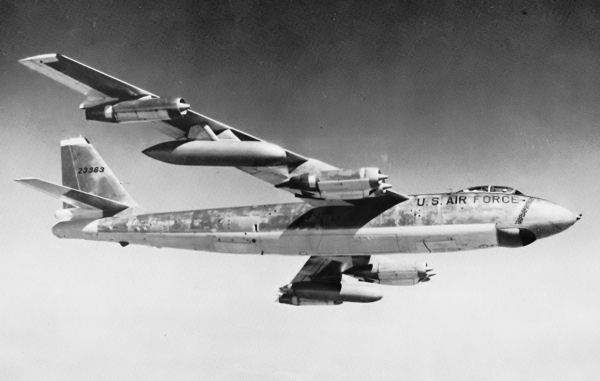
USAF A Boeing B-47E-50-LM in flight.

Cold War tensions with the Soviet Union in Europe began as early as 1946. In November, President Harry S. Truman ordered Strategic Air Command (SAC) B-29 Superfortress bombers to Europe. Truman decided to realign United States Air Force Europe (USAFE) into a permanent combat-capable force. In July 1948, B-29s of the SAC 2nd Bombardment Group were deployed to Lakenheath. The first USAFE host unit at Lakenheath was the 7504th Base Completion Squadron, being activated in 1949.

Amongst other units present were 3913 Air Base Sqdn (1953-55, Lt Col Archie Thomas), 3910 Installation Sqdn (1955-59, Maj John F Thomas), and 3910 Air Base Group (1955-59, Col L M Thomas). On 30 April 1956, two Lockheed U-2s were airlifted to Lakenheath to form CIA Detachment A. The first flight of the U-2 was on 21 May. The Central Intelligence Agency unit did not remain long, moving to Wiesbaden Air Base, West Germany in June 1956.

On 10 October 1956, a United States Navy Douglas R6D-1 Liftmaster disappeared over the Atlantic Ocean after departure from RAF Lakenheath for a flight to Lajes Field in the Azores. The aircraft was on a Military Air Transport Service flight carrying 50 members of the 307th Bombardment Wing, on their way home to the United States after a temporary duty assignment and a US Navy crew of nine. All 59 personnel on board were lost.

==== 48th Tactical Fighter Wing ====
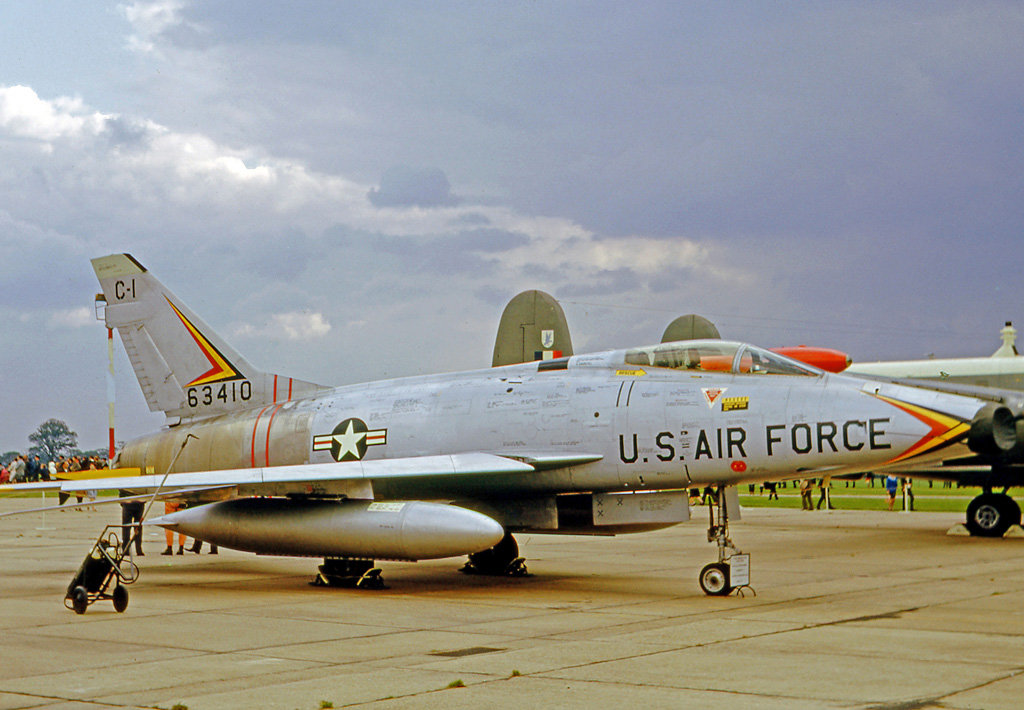
A F-100D Super Sabre of 494 Tactical Fighter Squadron 48 TFW, 1965

Following French president Charles de Gaulle's insistence in 1959 that all non-French nuclear-capable forces should be withdrawn from his country, the USAF began a redeployment of its North American F-100-equipped units from France. The 48th Fighter Wing left its base at Chaumont-Semoutiers Air Base, France on 15 January 1960, its aircraft arriving at Lakenheath that afternoon.

The tactical components of the 48th TFW upon arrival at Lakenheath were:

- 492d Tactical Fighter Squadron (blue colours, later assigned tailcode 'LR')
- 493d Tactical Fighter Squadron (yellow colours, later assigned tailcode 'LS')
- 494th Tactical Fighter Squadron (red colours, later assigned tailcode 'LT')

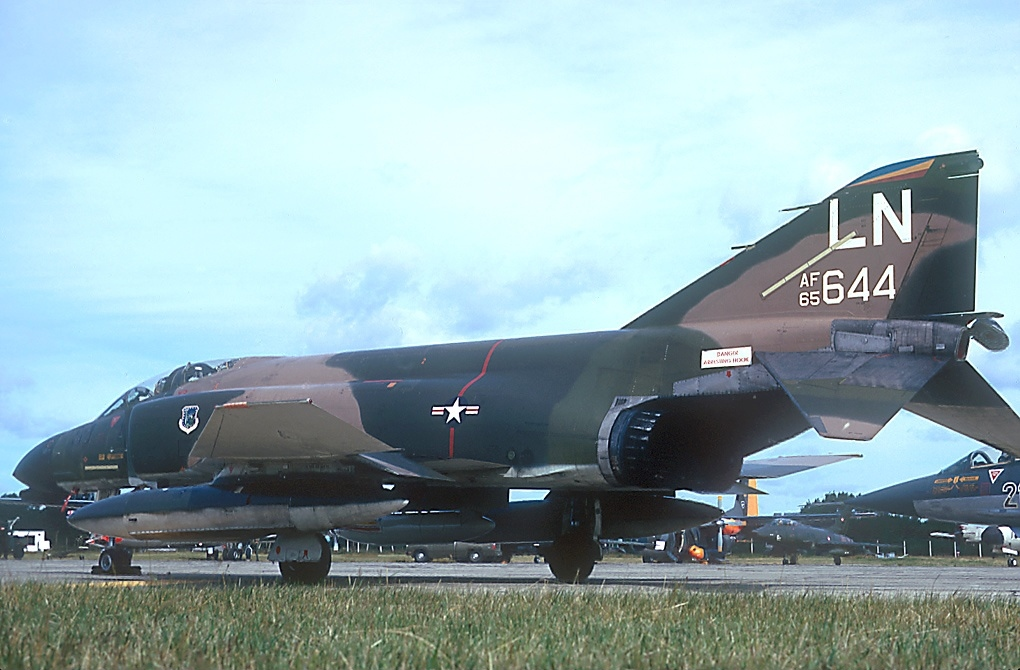
48th TFW McDonnell F-4D Phantom II, 1974, note the tri-colour fin tip

Beginning in late 1971, the 48th TFW started its conversion to the McDonnell Douglas F-4D Phantom II, receiving aircraft that had previously served in Vietnam, with all squadrons now marked with the new 'LN' tailcode. The delivery of F-4s was intermittent, and working up to a full strength of 73 aircraft took 2½ years. Consequently the wing only resumed its full NATO and USAFE commitments on 1 July 1975. However the F-4's service with the 48th Tactical Fighter Wing was short, as operation "Ready Switch" resulted in 48th Tactical Fighter Wing receiving General Dynamics F-111s in June 1977.

==== African-American service members during the Cold War ====
After the US desegregated the military in 1948, a small community of mixed-race children, whose mothers were British and whose fathers were black American service members based at Lakenheath, formed in Norwich.

Vanessa Baird, whose father was a black GI based in Lakenheath airfield and whose mother was a Liverpudlian, was born in April 1958. Her father did not know about the birth. Her mother's family was very disapproving after they found out. So Vanessa and her mother went to Norwich. There, according to Baird, some of the women married black GIs and went to the US with them.

Elaine Brown had a similar experience to Vanessa. Her mother met black GI Harold Grigsby when he was based at Lakenheath in the early 1950s. Her father was sent back to the US before Elaine was born in 1953. Elaine's mother told her her father's name and that he was from Washington DC. In 1996 with her husband Elaine finally found her father and met her American family.

=== F-111 operations, 1977-1992 ===
RAF Lakenheath received its first General Dynamics F-111F Aardvarks in March 1977 as part of Operation "Ready Switch", a three-way aircraft exchange between USAF units. The transition from the McDonnell Douglas F-4D Phantom II was completed rapidly and without major difficulty, earning the 48th Tactical Fighter Wing an Air Force Outstanding Unit Award.

To support the new aircraft and its specialised training requirements, the 495th Tactical Fighter Squadron was activated on 1 April 1977 as a replacement training unit for the wing's other squadrons. This made the 48th Tactical Fighter Wing unique within the United States Air Forces in Europe as the only combat wing operating four fighter squadrons and its own training unit.

During the Cold War, the wing maintained a high state of readiness as part of NATO's deterrent forces, regularly conducting exercises and deployments across Europe and the Middle East. By 1979, the wing had flown the highest number of hours recorded by a F-111 unit in a single fiscal year.

In April 1986, F-111Fs from RAF Lakenheath participated in Operation El Dorado Canyon, carrying out long-range strike missions against targets in Libya in response to state-sponsored terrorism. The aircraft flew extended-duration missions from the United Kingdom to Libya and back, demonstrating the aircraft's long-range strike capability.

Following Iraq's invasion of Kuwait in 1990, the 48th Tactical Fighter Wing deployed F-111Fs and personnel to Saudi Arabia as part of Operation Desert Shield and subsequently Operation Desert Storm. During the conflict, Lakenheath-based aircraft flew thousands of combat sorties and delivered precision-guided munitions against a wide range of targets, including armoured vehicles, bunkers and airfields.

After the end of the Cold War, the USAF began phasing out the F-111. The 495th Tactical Fighter Squadron was deactivated in December 1991, and the remaining aircraft were withdrawn during 1992 as RAF Lakenheath transitioned to the McDonnell Douglas F-15E Strike Eagle.

=== F-15 operations, 1992–present ===
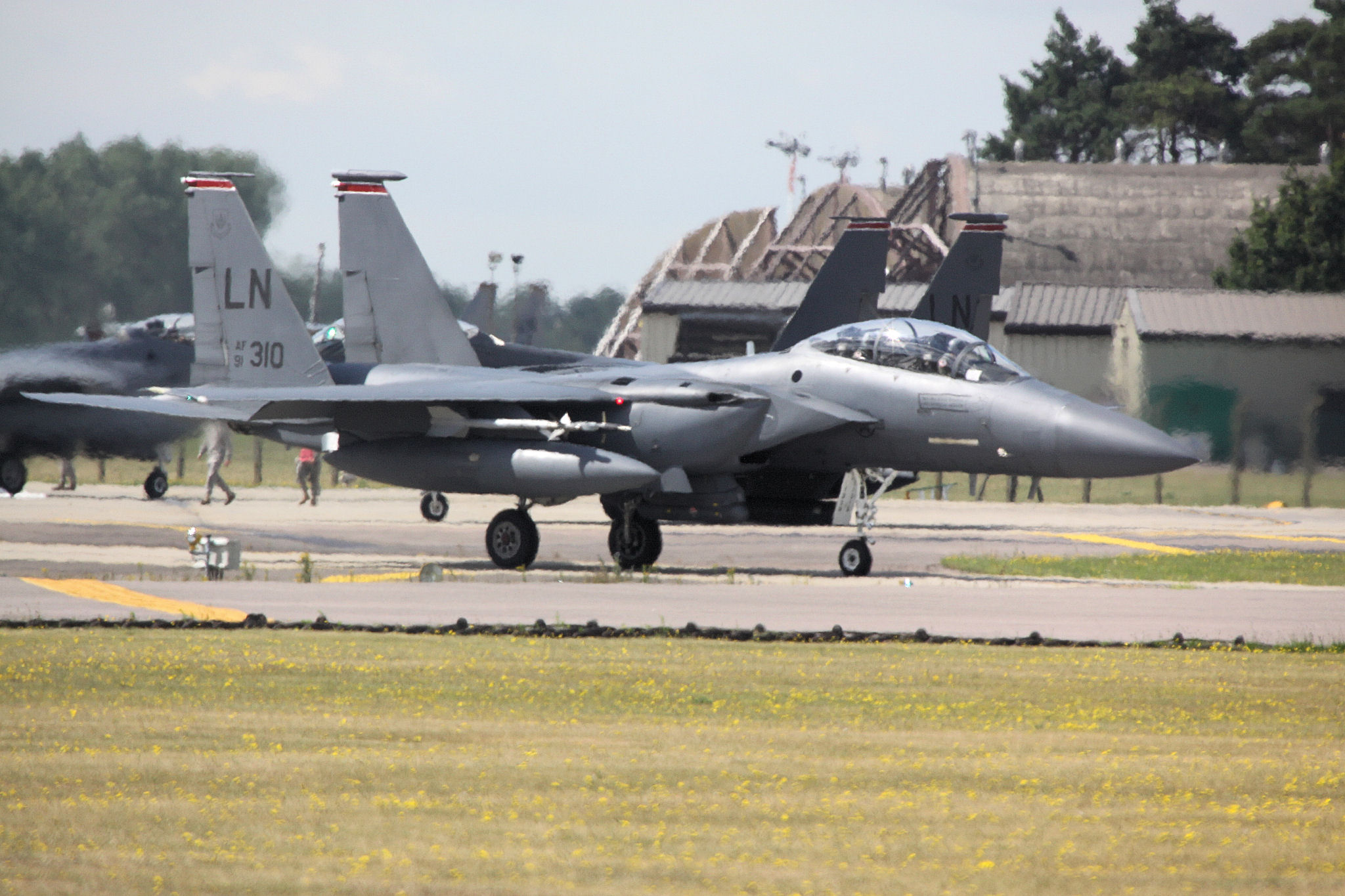
A McDonnell Douglas F-15E Strike Eagle at RAF Lakenheath, July 2009

Lakenheath received its first McDonnell Douglas F-15E Strike Eagles in 1992, marking the beginning of continuous F-15 operations at the base. On 16 December 1992, the last F-111 departed the base. Along with its departure, the 493d FS was inactivated, before being reactivated as an F-15C/D unit. The squadron received its first aircraft in November 1993 in preparation for its reactivation on 1 January 1994, achieving full operational capability in July 1994.

On 22 March 2011, F-15E 91-0304 crash-landed and was destroyed in eastern Libya after reportedly suffering from a mechanical failure. Both crewmen ejected and were safely recovered.

On 8 October 2014, F-15D 86-0182 belonging to the 493d Fighter Squadron crashed during a training flight in a field outside Spalding, Lincolnshire. The pilot successfully ejected and was shortly recovered to RAF Lakenheath on board a Sikorsky HH-60 Pave Hawk.

In addition to supporting three combat-ready squadrons of fighter aircraft, the Liberty Wing also housed the 56th Rescue Squadron's HH-60G combat search and rescue helicopters until its re-location to Aviano Air Base in 2018.

On 15 June 2020, an F-15C belonging to the 493d Fighter Squadron crashed during a training flight in the North Sea, approximately 74 nautical miles (85 mi; 137 km) east of Scarborough. The pilot 1st Lt. Kenneth "Kage" Allen, was killed; his body was later recovered.

The planned withdrawal of the F-15C/D fleet from RAF Lakenheath began in September 2021. The process was temporarily delayed due to heightened tensions in Eastern Europe following the Russian military build-up near Ukraine. On 27 April 2022, the final four F-15C aircraft of the 493d Fighter Squadron departed RAF Lakenheath for the United States marking the end of 45 years of continuous USAF F-15 Eagle air superiority operations in Europe.

In March 2026, at least one F-15E Strike Eagle from RAF Lakenheath was reportedly involved in a friendly fire incident over Kuwait during Operation Epic Fury, the United States-led air campaign against Iran. According to BBC Verify analysis of footage and aircraft markings, one of the aircraft shot down by Kuwaiti air defences was identified as F-15E serial 91-0327 of the 492d Fighter Squadron. All aircrew involved ejected safely and were recovered.

On 3 April 2026, an F-15E Strike Eagle of the 494th Fighter Squadron was lost during combat operations over Iran. The aircraft was subsequently identified from markings on the recovered wreckage as serial 00-3000 and as belonging to the squadron. Both crew members ejected and survived, with their recovery requiring a multi-day combat search-and-rescue operation.

=== F-35A Lightning II, 2021-present ===
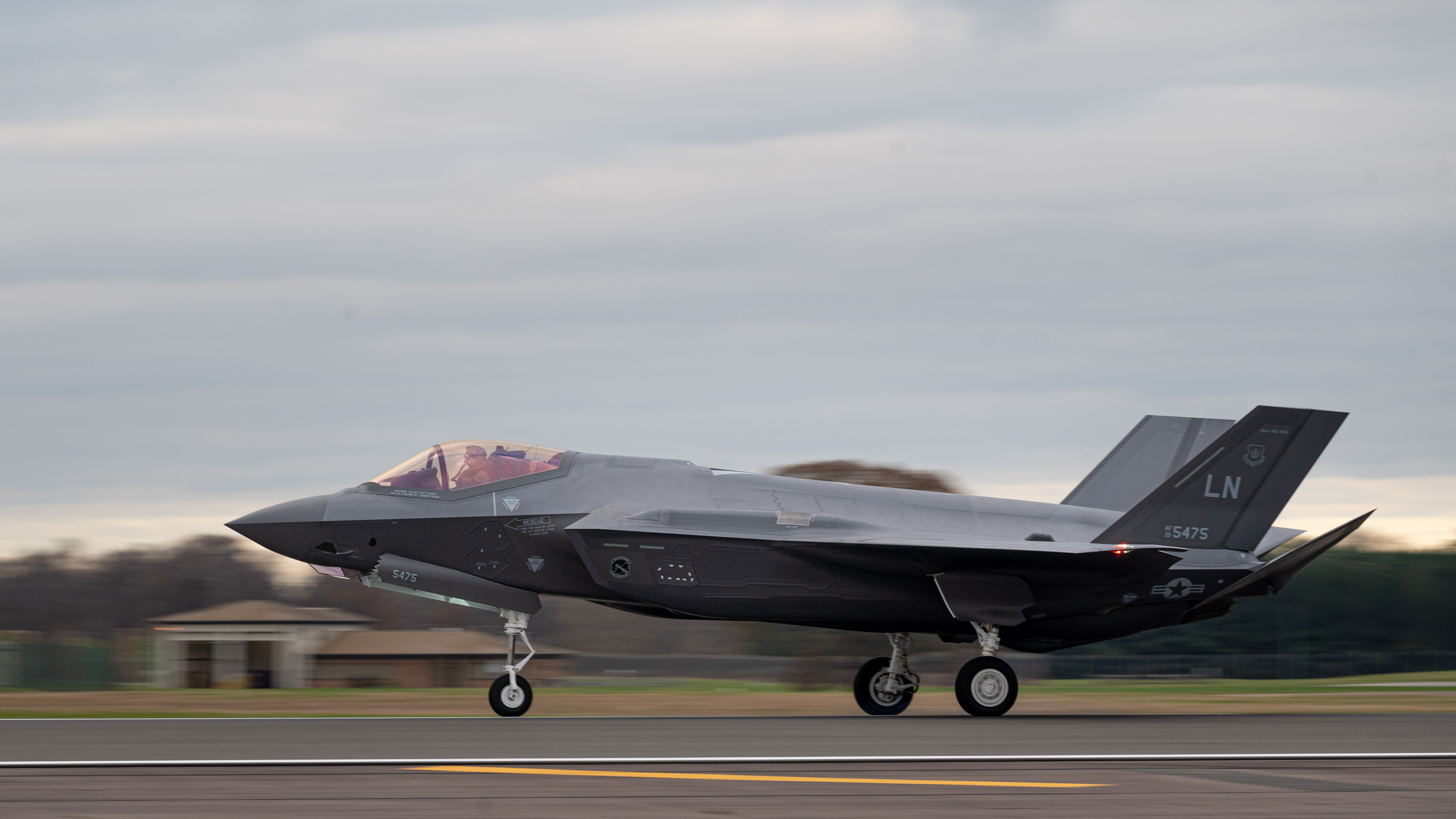
A F-35A of the 495th Fighter Squadron lands at Lakenheath, 15 December 2021.

In January 2015, the US Department of Defense announced that RAF Lakenheath would become home to 54 Lockheed Martin F-35A Lightning II multi-role fighters from 2020. The aircraft were to be split between two squadrons, with an increase of 1,200 military personnel and 60–100 civilian workers. The F-35 would operate alongside the two existing F-15E Strike Eagle squadrons.

==== Squadrons ====
The 495th Fighter Squadron was reactivated on 1 October 2021 to be the first Lightning II squadron at RAF Lakenheath, with the first aircraft arriving on 15 December 2021.

The 493d Fighter Squadron was re-equipped with the F-35A Lightning II following the retirement of its F-15C/D fleet in 2022. The transition marked a shift from an air superiority mission to a multirole capability.

==== Infrastructure ====
Construction of a dedicated F-35 campus began in 2017 on the south side of the airfield.

Key facilities included:

- Two six-bay maintenance hangars (Hangars 4-1 and 4-2) for service, maintenance, storage and staff support
- Hangar 6 (Consolidated Parts Store) and aircraft ground equipment facilities
- Dual squadron operations/aircraft maintenance unit (AMU) building, combining squadron operations, mission planning, administration and maintenance storage
- Flight simulator and training facilities
- Corrosion control and wash rack facilities, including paint and sanding booths
- Residential accommodation, dining facility, and hospital
- High school for up to 560 students.

The operational surfaces were expanded:

- Charlie Apron was redeveloped to accommodate up to 42 F-35A aircraft in dual-occupancy shelters, totalling 78,392 square metres
- Alpha-Bravo Apron was extended to accommodate up to 38 F-15 aircraft on open apron, totalling 54,179 square metres, allowing consolidation of F-15E operations

==== Infrastructure delivery ====
In August 2018, a $148.4 million (£116.7M) investment for F-35A infrastructure at Lakenheath was authorised by the Trump administration. In November 2018, the Defence Infrastructure Organisation awarded a £160M contract for construction to a joint venture between Kier Group and VolkerFitzpatrick.

Demolition of the first of eighteen buildings began in March 2019 to make way for the F-35 campus. The Alpha-Bravo Apron work was completed in August 2020, allowing F-15E Strike Eagle operations of the 492d and 494th Fighter Squadrons to be consolidated on one ramp.

=== Incidents and accidents ===
Two accidents involving nuclear weapons happened at RAF Lakenheath, in 1956 and 1961.

On 2 March 2011, members of the 48th Security Forces Squadron were involved in a shooting at Frankfurt Airport in Germany. The members were on a bus bound for Ramstein Air Base in Germany when they were attacked by a lone gunman.

On 7 January 2014, a Sikorsky HH-60 Pave Hawk from the base crashed following a bird strike while on a low-level training exercise with another helicopter (also a Pave Hawk), into the Cley Marshes near Cley next the Sea on the nearby North Norfolk coast. All four occupants were killed.

A US Marine Corps Boeing F/A-18 Hornet of VMFA-232 "Red Devils" from MCAS Miramar, California, crashed after taking off from RAF Lakenheath on 21 October 2015. The pilot, Major Taj "Cabbie" Sareen, was killed.

==== Drone incidents ====
In 2024, between 20 and 22 November, small unmanned aerial systems (UASs) were spotted in the vicinity of and over RAF Lakenheath, RAF Mildenhall, and RAF Feltwell. The number of UASs fluctuated and they ranged in size and configuration. F-15E Strike Eagles, based at Lakenheath, were reportedly scrambled in response to the drones as they impacted local flight operations. RAF Regiment personnel were later deployed to the bases with the ORCUS C-UAS system in response to a second sighting of unidentified drones in the night hours of 25 November.

On 13 November 2026, US Air Force security personnel responded to reports of suspected unauthorised drone activity over RAF Lakenheath. Personnel at the base were instructed to shelter in place. No injuries or damage to aircraft or infrastructure were reported. The US Air Force and the UK Ministry of Defence said that the incident had been resolved and that they were working together to establish the facts.

== Based units ==
Flying and notable non-flying units based at RAF Lakenheath.

=== United States Air Force ===
United States Air Forces in Europe - Air Forces Africa (USAFE - AFAFRICA)

- 48th Fighter Wing
  - 48th Operations Group
    - 48th Operations Support Squadron
    - 492d Fighter Squadron – F-15E Strike Eagle
    - 493d Fighter Squadron – F-35A Lightning II
    - 494th Fighter Squadron – F-15E Strike Eagle
    - 495th Fighter Squadron – F-35A Lightning II
  - 48th Maintenance Group
    - 492d Fighter Generation Squadron
    - 493d Fighter Generation Squadron
    - 494th Fighter Generation Squadron
    - 495th Fighter Generation Squadron
    - 48th Component Maintenance Squadron
    - 48th Equipment Maintenance Squadron
    - 48th Maintenance Operations Squadron
    - 48th Munitions Squadron
  - 48th Medical Group
    - 48th Dental Squadron
    - 48th Inpatient Operations Squadron
    - 48th Medical Operations Squadron
    - 48th Medical Support Squadron
    - 48th Surgical Operations Squadron
  - 48th Mission Support Group
    - 48th Civil Engineer Squadron
    - 48th Communications Squadron
    - 48th Contracting Squadron
    - 48th Force Support Squadron
    - 48th Logistics Readiness Squadron
    - 48th Security Forces Squadron
  - 48th Fighter Wing Staff Agencies
    - Judge Advocate Office
    - Public Affairs
    - 48th Comptroller Squadron
    - Safety - Occupational/Weapons/Aviation
    - Equal Opportunities
    - Sexual Assault Prevention
    - Protocol
    - Inspector General

The base also has 1,500 British and US civilian staff, that serve the base at the site.

== Nuclear weapons ==
In February 2024, US documents emerged detailing the awarding of contracts to build new storage facilities for nuclear cores stimulated public discussion in East Anglia that nuclear weapons may be redeployed to Lakenheath in the near future.

In July 2025, evidence and flight activity suggested a specialist USAF squadron flew an unknown number of B61‑12 tactical nuclear gravity bombs into Lakenheath from a storage site in New Mexico.

== Heritage ==
=== Gate guardian ===
RAF Lakenheath's gate guardian is North American F-100D Super Sabre, serial number '54-2269'. The aircraft was originally delivered to the French Air Force. On return it was moved to the "Wings of Liberty Memorial Park" at RAF Lakenheath. Firstly it was painted as '55-4048', latterly as '56-3319'.

== Protests ==
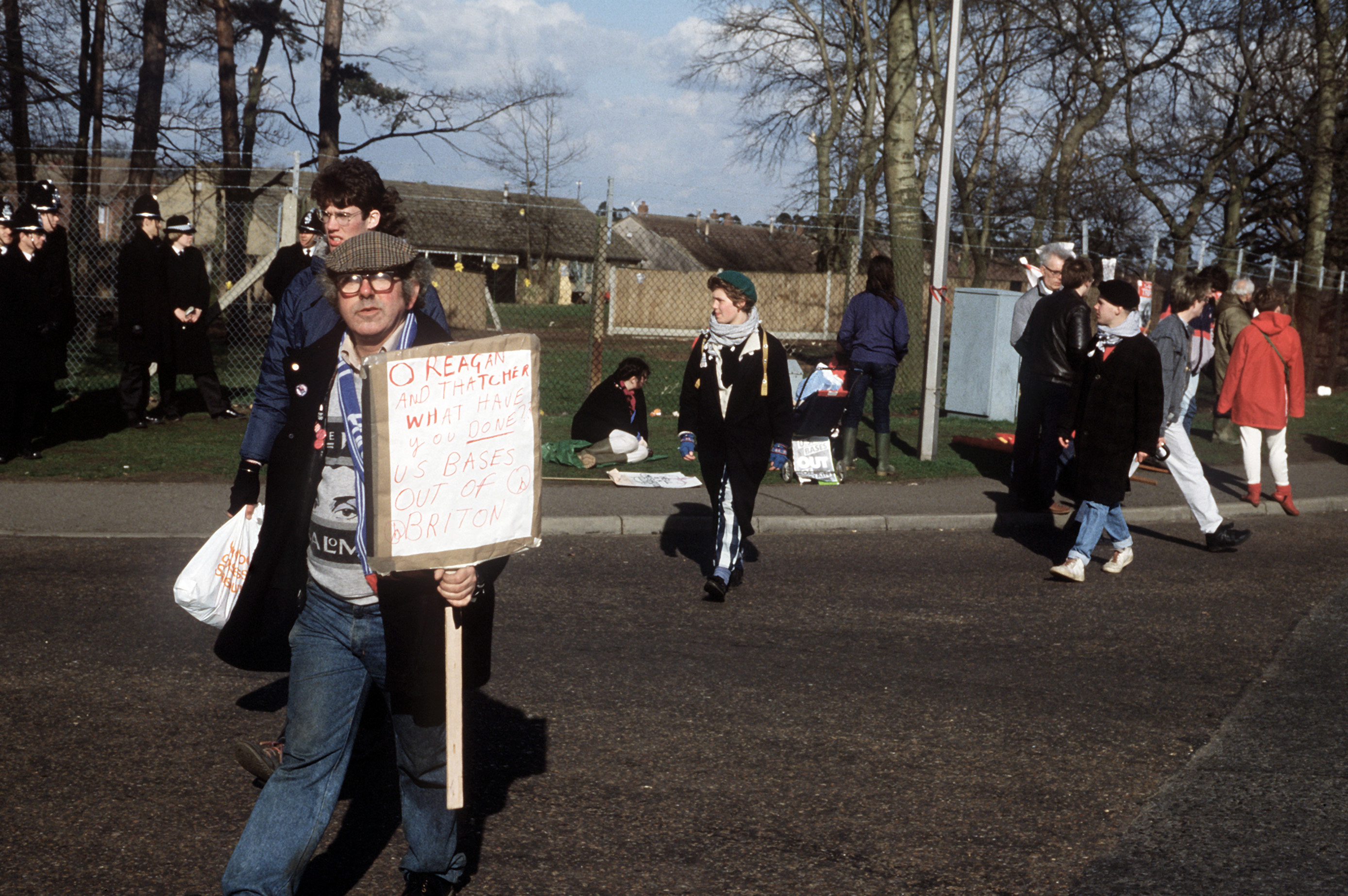
Demonstrators outside RAF Lakenheath following its use in the 1986 bombing of Libya

Since the base's founding, RAF Lakenheath has been targeted for numerous peace protests from groups such as Stop the War Coalition, Campaign for Nuclear Disarmament, and Lakenheath Alliance for Peace.

=== Pershing ===
Lakenheath was one of the proposed sites of the NATO Pershing II Missile System. The deployment of the Missile system sparked protests all over Western Europe, and RAF Lakenheath was one of the most prominent military sites. The radical historian E.P. Thompson wrote in a pamphlet that basing the system at RAF Lakenheath directly endangered the lives of those in the nearby city of Cambridge:

"...Lakenheath is, by crow or cruise, just over twenty miles from Cambridge. It is possible that Cambridge but less probable that Oxford will fall outside the CEP. Within the CEP we must suppose some fifteen or twenty detonations at least on the scale of Hiroshima, without taking into account any possible detonations, release of radio-active materials, etc., if the strike should succeed in finding out the cruise missiles at which it was aimed."

A semi-permanent 'peace camp' was set up outside RAF Lakenheath. In 1985, the future Archbishop of Canterbury Rowan Williams was arrested for singing psalms at a CND protest at Lakenheath.

=== Libya ===
Over 1,000 people demonstrated outside RAF Lakenheath in protest at the 1986 United States bombing of Libya.

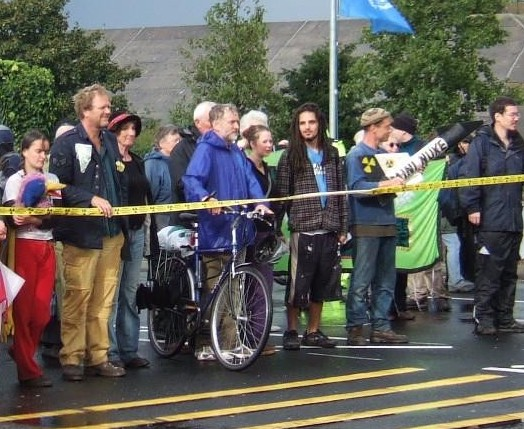
Protestors including Jeremy Corbyn, outside RAF Lakenheath in 2006.

=== Iraq war ===
The 2003 invasion of Iraq sparked a new wave of peace protests. In one incident, 9 protestors gained access to the base by cutting through its perimeter fence. The protestors rode bicycles along the main runway, before chaining themselves together.

Activists later established a 'peace camp' outside RAF Lakenheath to draw attention to the base.

In 2006, a group of 200 people protested against the alleged nuclear weapons stored at RAF Lakenheath. There were further protests on this issue in 2008.

=== Iran war ===
During the Iran War, a protest was held outside the station on 4 April 2026 following reports that a US fighter jet had been shot down by Iran on 3 April, with some media outlets claiming it had taken off from RAF Lakenheath. On 5 April 2026, around seven demonstrators were arrested at the base for allegedly supporting the banned Palestine Action group.

On 8 April 2026, further protests took place outside RAF Lakenheath, during which demonstrators staged a blockade of multiple base entrances. Suffolk Police arrested 13 individuals after protestors locked themselves to vehicles, a large peace symbol, and each other, causing several hours of disruption to traffic and access to the base. Seven people were subsequently charged with offences including locking on, attempted locking on, and obstruction of the highway, and were released on bail. The protest, organised by the Lakenheath Alliance for Peace, was part of wider opposition to the United States and Israel's involvement in the conflict with Iran.

== Gallery ==
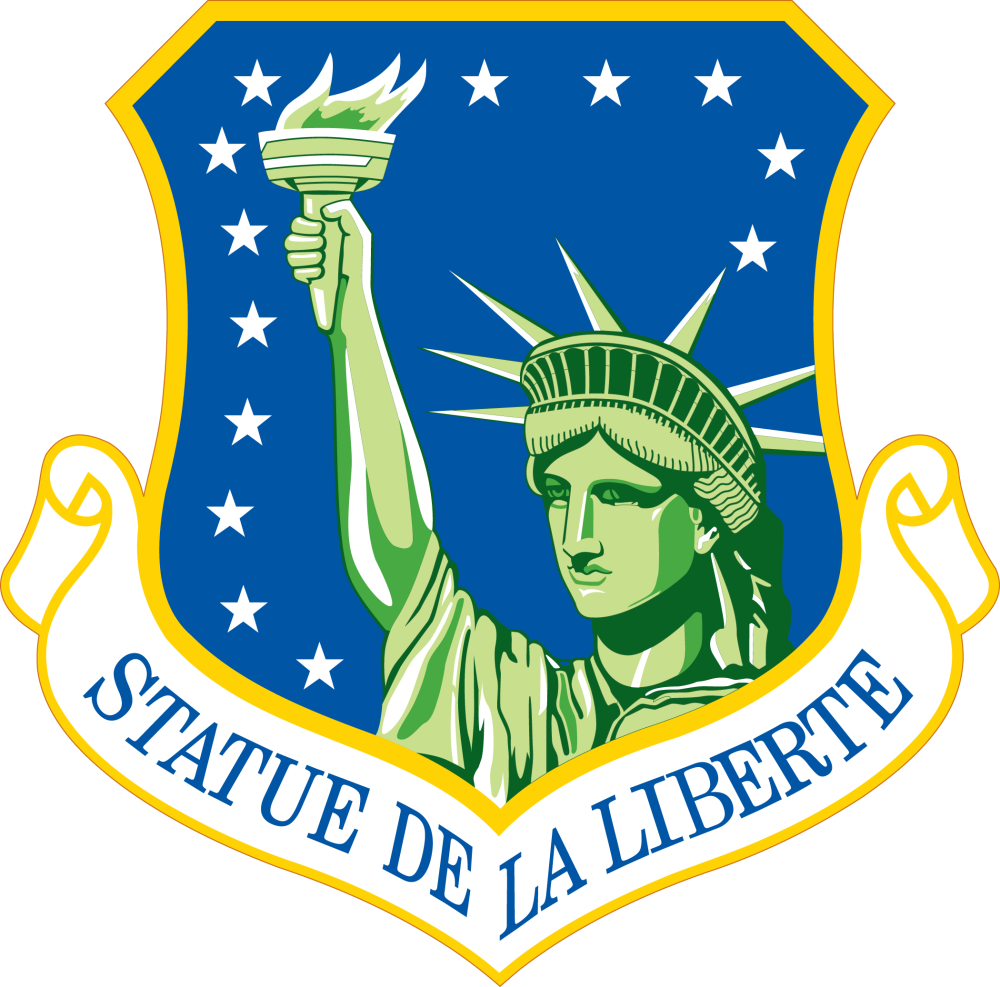
48th Fighter Wing

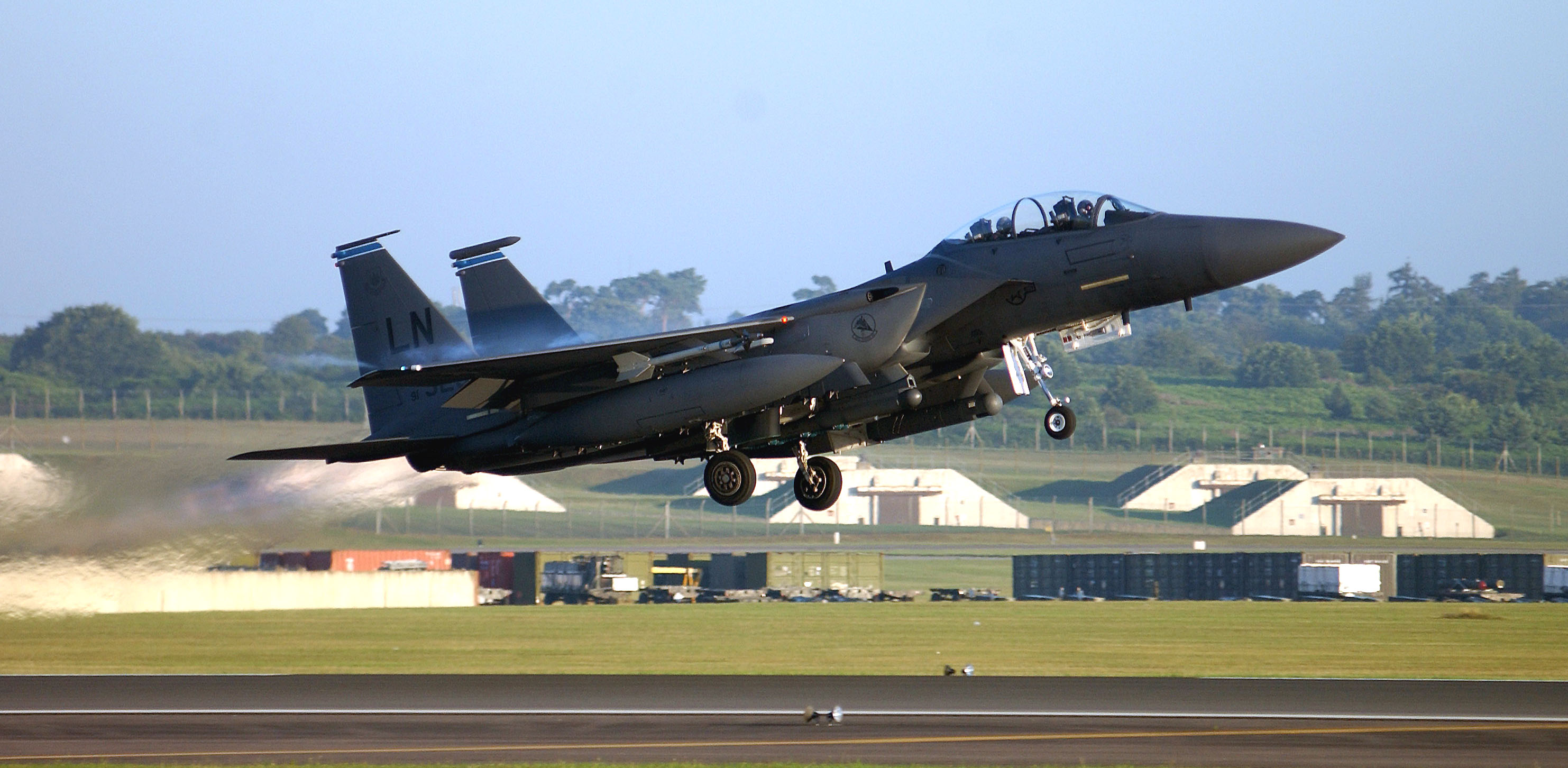
A 492d Fighter Squadron F-15E Strike Eagle from Lakenheath lifts off from the airfield's runway

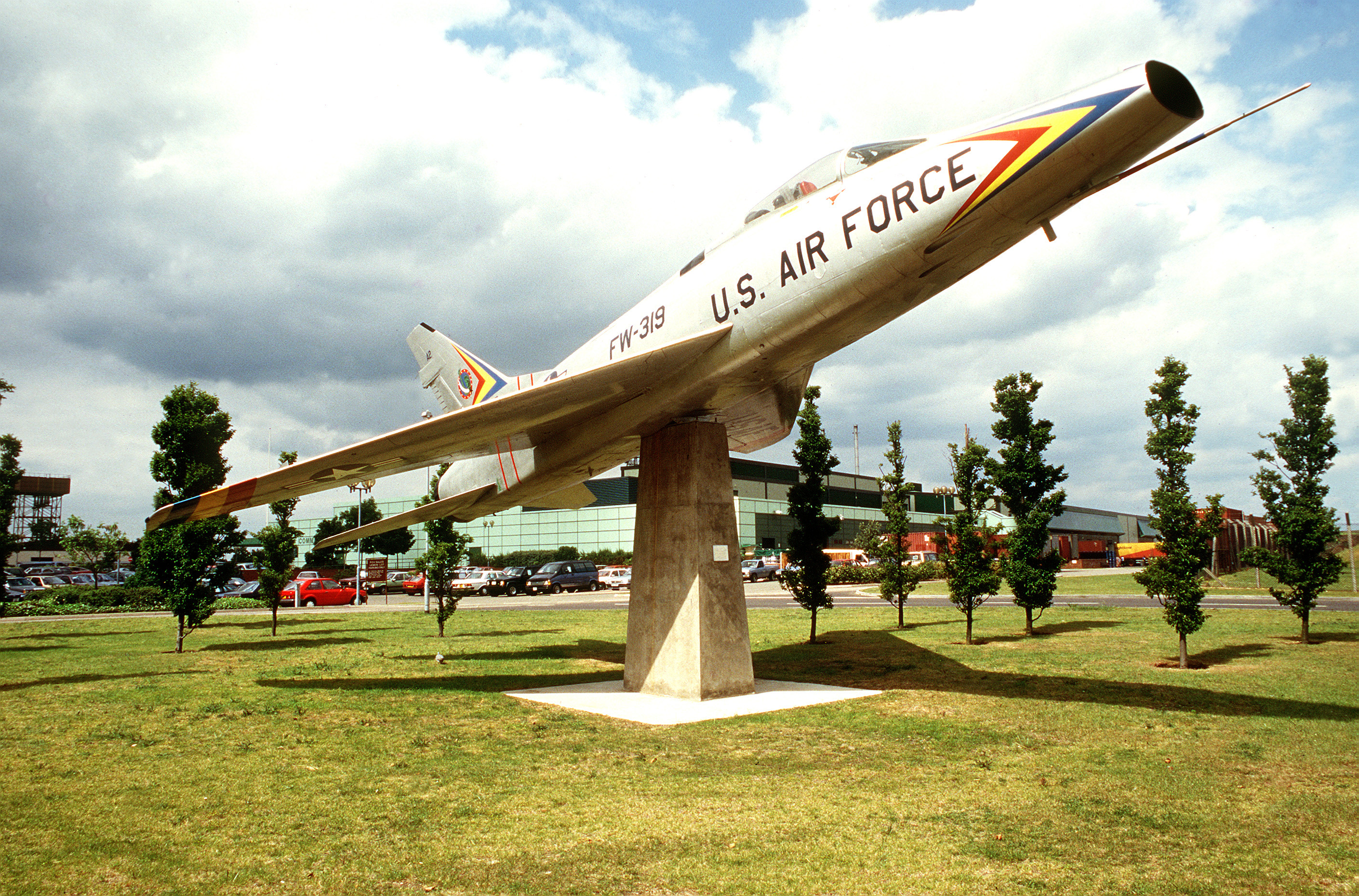
The F-100 is displayed on a permanent stand. It was the second aircraft to represent the Liberty Wing. It flew for the 48th Fighter Wing between 1956 and 1972 before it was replaced by the F-4 Phantom.

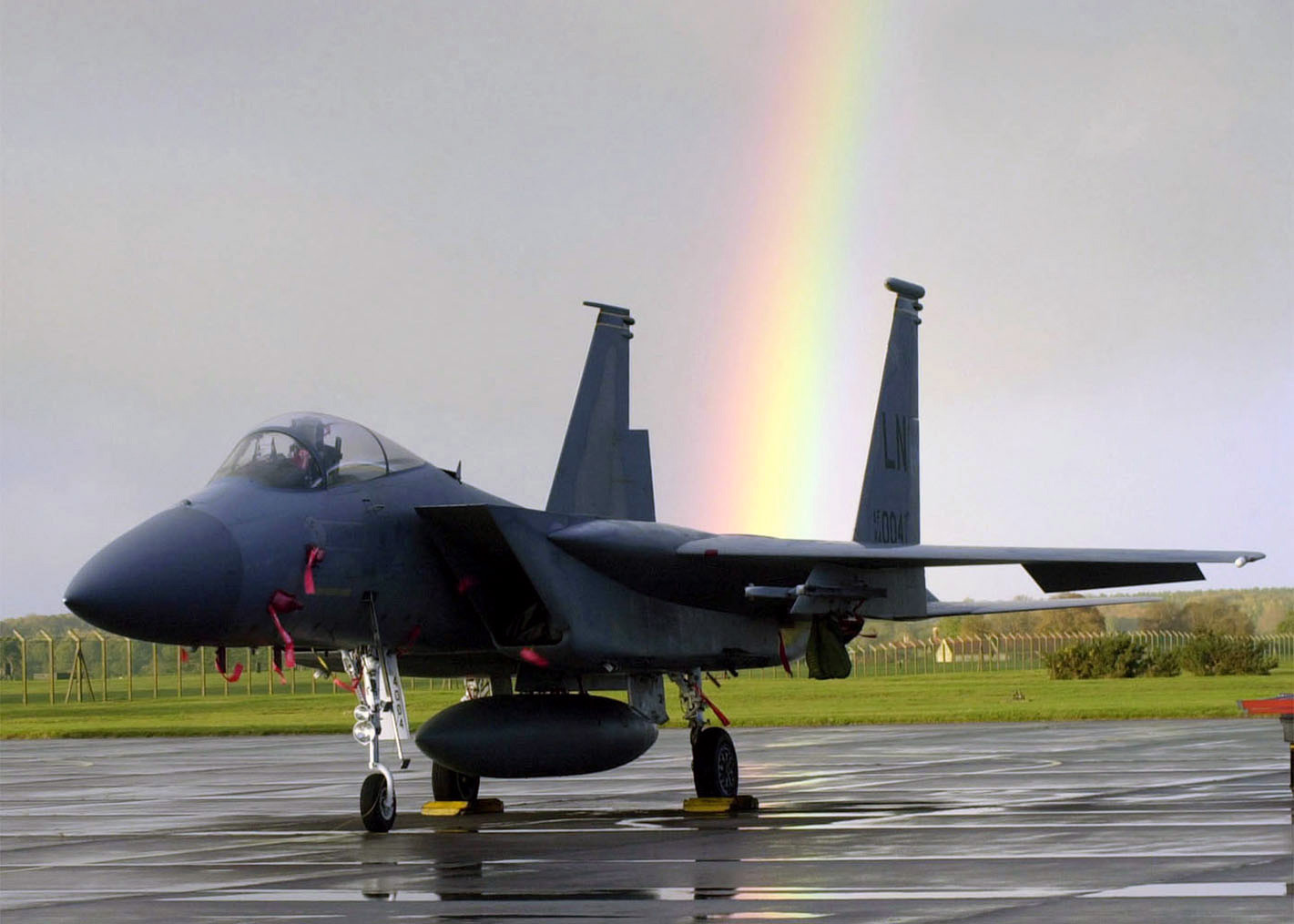
A F-15C Eagle aircraft from the 493rd Fighter Squadron, 48th Fighter Wing, parked on the apron at RAF Lakenheath

== See also ==
- List of Royal Air Force stations
- Strategic Air Command in the United Kingdom
- United States Air Force in the United Kingdom
- United States Air Forces in Europe - Air Forces Africa
