= 48th Fighter Wing =

48th Fighter Wing

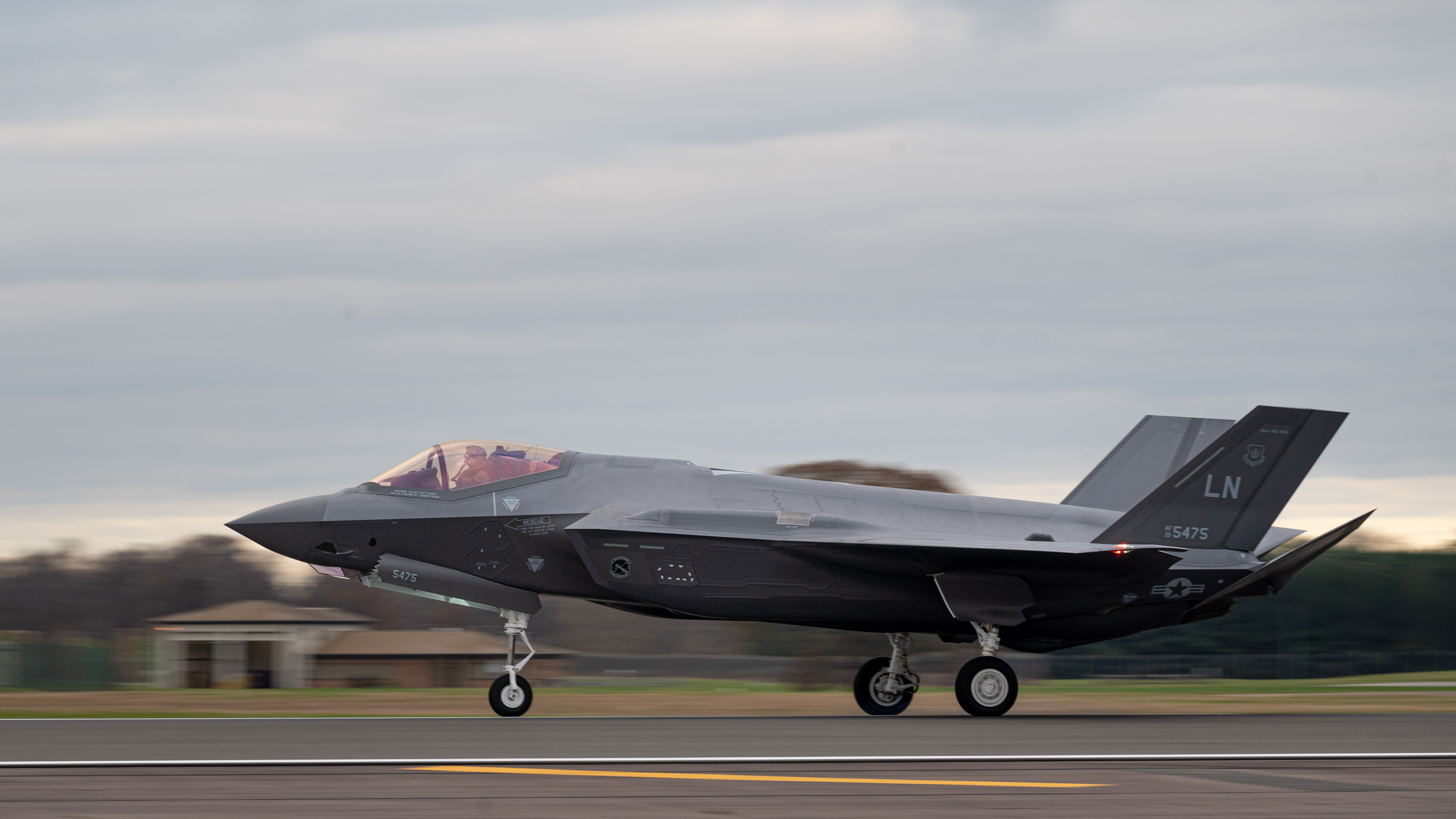
- Arrival of the first F-35A of the 495th FS, 21 December 2021
- Active: 10 July 1952 – present
- Country: United States
- Branch: United States Air Force
- Type: Operational wing
- Role: Multirole combat
- Size: c. 7,000 personnel
- Part of: United States Air Forces in Europe – Air Forces Africa (Third Air Force)
- Base: RAF Lakenheath, United Kingdom
- Nickname: Statue of Liberty Wing
- Motto: Vulneratus non Victus (Latin for 'Unconquered Even Though Wounded') (1952-1962) Statue de la Libertė (French for 'Statue of Liberty') (1962–present)
- Decorations: Air Force Outstanding Unit Award
- Website: Official website

Commanders
- Current commander: Brig. Gen. Michael C. Alfaro
- Deputy Commander: Col. Nicholas Jurewicz
- Command Chief: CCM Joseph D. Rohde
- Notable commanders: Jay B. Silveria

Insignia
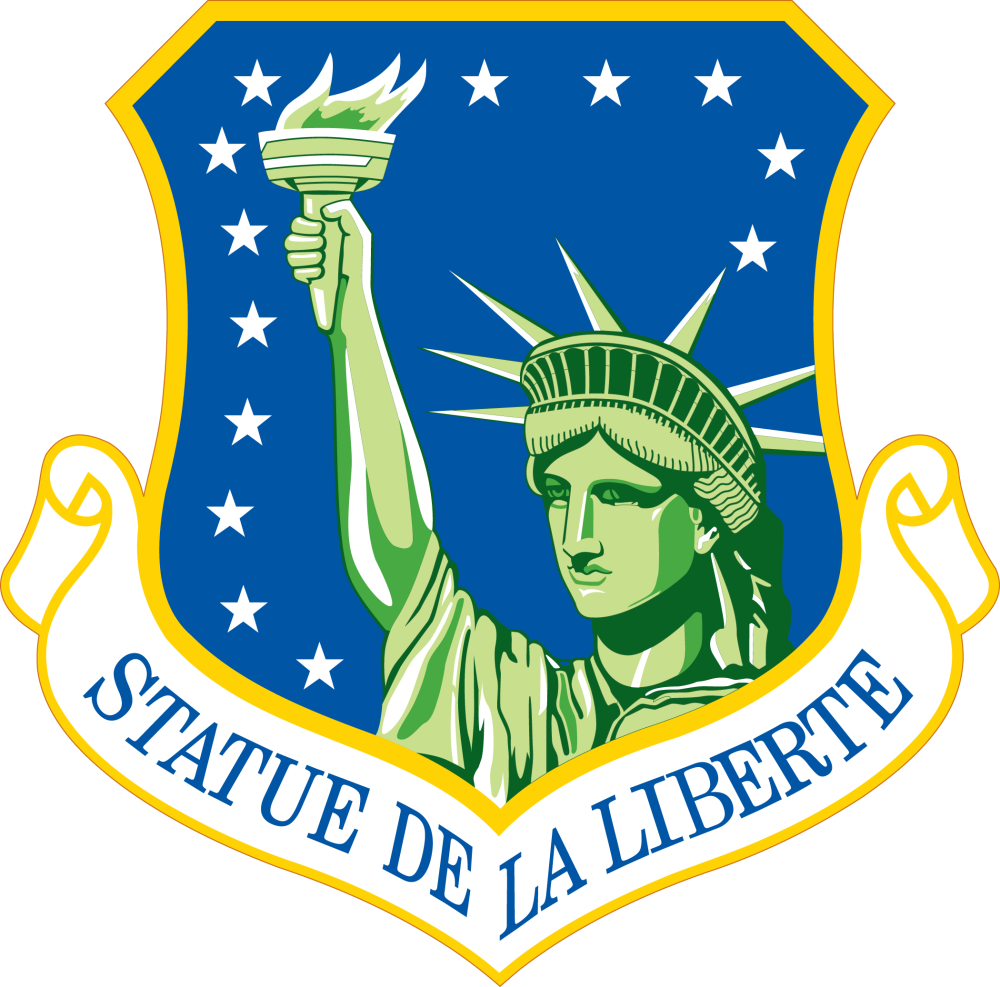
- 48th Fighter Wing emblem (Note: Approved 5 July 1962.)

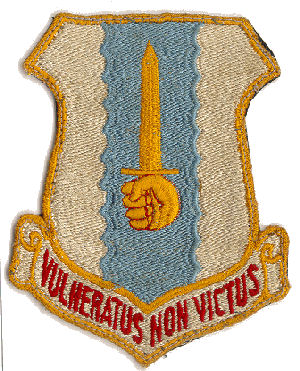
- Patch with 48th Fighter-Bomber Wing emblem (Note: Approved for 48th Fighter Group 12 January 1942)
- Tail code: LN

Aircraft flown
- Fighter: F-15E Strike Eagle; F-35A Lightning II

The 48th Fighter Wing (48 FW) is part of the United States Air Force's Third Air Force, assigned to Headquarters Air Command Europe and United States Air Forces in Europe. It is based at RAF Lakenheath, England. The 48 FW is the only McDonnell Douglas F-15 Eagle wing based in Europe which hosts two F-15E Strike Eagle squadrons. The wing also hosts two Lockheed Martin F-35 Lightning II squadrons. The 48 FW was given the name "Statue of Liberty Wing" on 4 July 1954 and remains the only U.S. Air Force unit with both a name and a numerical designation.

The 48 FW operates in support of United States Air Forces in Europe – Air Forces Africa, United States European Command and NATO.

== Units ==
The Liberty Wing has nearly 5,700 active-duty military members, 2,000 British and U.S. civilians, and includes a geographically separated accommodation unit at nearby RAF Feltwell. In total they support two squadrons of F-15E Strike Eagle and two squadrons of F-35A Lightning II fighter aircraft.

- 48th Operations Group

Formerly the 48th Fighter-Bomber Group. Provides four squadrons of F-35A & F-15E aircraft & personnel in support of USAFE, U.S. European Command and NATO operations.

- 48th Maintenance Group

includes 48th Aircraft Maintenance sqdn, 748th Aircraft Maintenance sqdn, 48th Component Maintenance sqdn, 48th Equipment Maintenance sqdn, 48th Maintenance Operations sqdn and 48th Munitions sqdn. These units manage and maintain all aspects of the F-15 and F-35 fighter aircraft, including the airframe, Pratt & Whitney F100 and Pratt & Whitney F135 engines, precision avionics, and weapons. However, between October 2022 and June 2023, at least two of these units (48th AMS & 748th AMS) were inactivated and replaced by individual squadron-based maintenance units identified as Fighter Generation Squadrons, namely 492nd, 493rd, 494th and 495th FGS.

- 48th Mission Support Group (48 MSG)
  - The 48th Civil Engineer Squadron maintains over 600 buildings, 1300 housing units, regional hospital, five DoD schools, and other infrastructure.
  - 48th Force Support Squadron; responsible for dining, lodging, fitness, honor guard, leisure activities, family programs, and mortuary affairs.
  - 48th Security Forces Squadron; protects & defends USAF facilities, coordinates law enforcement operations with host nation police agencies, operates US Forces Correctional Facility, maintains combat arms training range, provides small arms training, etc.
  - 48th Communications Squadron; provide & maintain computer, data and voice communication, and United States Postal Service facility.
- 48th Medical Group (48 MDG)

The 48 MDG provides healthcare services to over 35,000 eligible beneficiaries at six operating locations across the UK, and in Norway, covering personnel & dependants from 48th Fighter Wing, 100th Air Refueling Wing, 501st Combat Support Wing, and 352nd Special Operations Wing. This includes 67,000 dental visits, 1550 surgeries, and 450 infant deliveries per year. The unit also maintains an Expeditionary Medical Support (EMEDS) capability.

== History ==
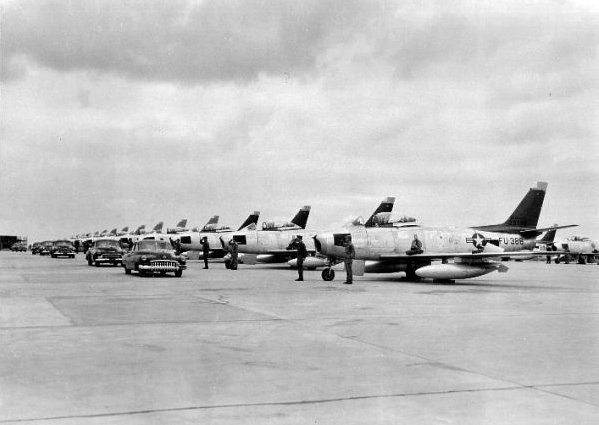
F-86Fs 48th FBW, at Chaumont Air Base, France, November 1953

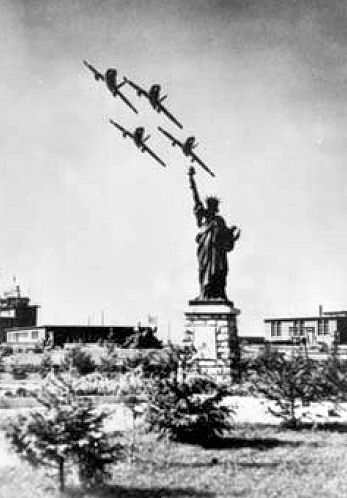
Statue dedication ceremony, F-86s at Chaumont Air Base, 4 July 1956

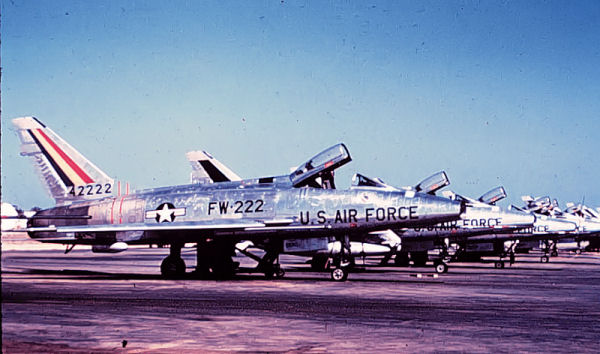
North American F-100D Super Sabres of the 48th Tactical Fighter Wing – 1957. The aircraft in foreground, AF Ser. No. 54-2222, is the Wing Commander's aircraft.

On 10 July 1952, the Oklahoma Air National Guard 137th Fighter-Bomber Wing at Chaumont-Semoutiers Air Base, France was redesignated the 48th Fighter-Bomber Wing. The fighter squadrons being redesignated the 492d, 493d, and 494th respectively, the 58 F-84Gs and support aircraft of the ANG were assigned to the 48th Fighter-Bomber Group under the Hobson Plan. The 48th FBW commanded the functions of both the support groups as well as the flying combat 48th FBG. The few National Guardsmen still with the wing departed and the last were released from active duty on 9 July, although a few reserve officers remained on active duty for an additional six to twelve months.

With the F-84, the 48 FBW took part in North Atlantic Treaty Organization and United States Air Forces in Europe (USAFE) activities, participating in exercises with the U.S. Seventh Army. In addition, the 48th conducted operational readiness exercises and tactical evaluations. Honing bombing and gunnery skills. The 48th frequently deployed to Wheelus Air Base, Libya for training.

The 48th Fighter-Bomber Wing remained at Chaumont-Semoutiers for seven and a half years, from 10 July 1952 to 15 January 1960. Its three flying squadrons, the 492d, 493d and 494th, remained unchanged throughout, while the wing converted from the F-84G Thunderjet to the F-86F Sabre in 1953 and, in late 1956, became the first USAFE unit to re-equip with the F-100D Super Sabre.

An open house was held once a year, with great numbers of French civilians in attendance. In 1954, over 15,000 attended the Armed Forces Day event to see static aircraft displays, watch flight demonstrations, listen to a French army band and other activities. In just over three years since construction began, Chaumont Air Base became an important part of the Haute-Marne region.

On 4 July 1954 the wing received the honorary title Statue de la Liberté (Statue of Liberty) Wing, in recognition of its contributions to the local area, at a ceremony presided over by the USAFE commander, Lieutenant General William H. Tunner, together with the mayor of Chaumont and the French secretary of state, Jean Masson. The title made the 48th the only U.S. Air Force unit to hold both a numerical designation and an official name. The wing subsequently adopted an emblem incorporating the Statue of Liberty, formally approved on 5 July 1962.

The wing's comptroller subsequently found that a foundry about 25 miles (40 km) from Chaumont still held one of the molds used to cast reductions of the Statue of Liberty from models by its sculptor, Frédéric Auguste Bartholdi. The foundry agreed to produce a 3-meter (9.8 ft) replica for $1,700, which the wing funded by raffling a Ford Versailles sedan. The statue was dedicated at Chaumont Air Base on 4 July 1956 and remains there as a memorial to the wing's service in France, and another replica stands at RAF Lakenheath.

In November 1953, the wing exchanged its F-84Cs for newer North American F-86 Sabre (F models), receiving 75 aircraft, 25 per squadron. Then word came in late 1956 that the Air Force would exchange the wing's Sabres for a newer aircraft: the North American F-100 Super Sabre. The larger-bodied F-100 was capable of carrying more ordnance than the F-86 and was one of the first fighters designed to operate at supersonic speeds. 90 single-seat F-100D aircraft were received, along with 13 F-100F dual-seaters.

The wing began realigning its units 15 March 1957, as part of an Air Force worldwide reorganization. The 48th Fighter-Bomber Group was inactivated on 8 December 1957 when its component squadrons were assigned directly to the 48th FBW.

As part of yet another organization change, the 48th dropped the "Fighter Bomber" designation 8 July 1958, becoming the 48th Tactical Fighter Wing. The three flying units also changed designation, becoming tactical fighter squadrons.

Despite the close relationship between the wing and the people of Chaumont, international relationships between France and the US deteriorated in the late 1950s, resulting in French president Charles de Gaulle demanding the removal of NATO forces from the country. Under a project known as "Red Richard", USAFE relocated its units from France to other locations around Europe. Simultaneously, the advent of the inter-continental ballistic missile had reduced the United States' dependence on European-based airborne medium-and long ranged bombers.

On 15 January 1960, the 48 TFW redeployed to an empty Strategic Air Command heavy bomber base, RAF Lakenheath, England. In the early the wing's three fighter squadrons lifted off Chaumont's runway and, after making farewell passes over the outlying village, headed toward the English Channel.

=== RAF Lakenheath ===
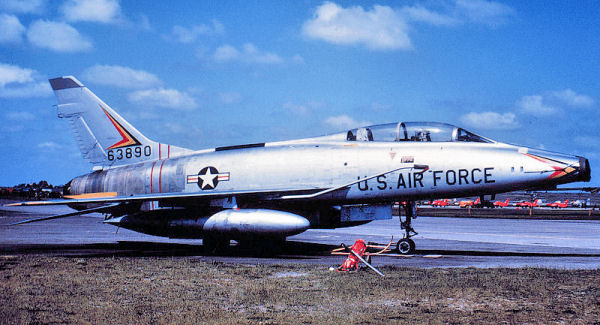
North American F-100F Super Sabre, 56-3890, in natural aluminum finish with 48th TFW tri-color chevron, 1966.

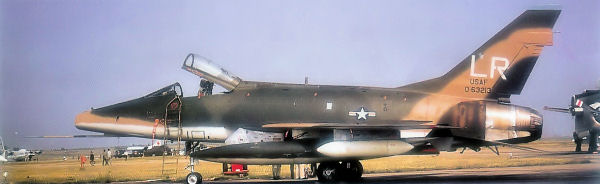
North American F-100D Super Sabre, 56-3213 of the 492d TFS in Southeast Asia camouflage, June 1970. Note the "LR" tailcode. (Note: Other 48th TFW F-100s were also at this June 1970 airshow, some marked with colored fin-tips)

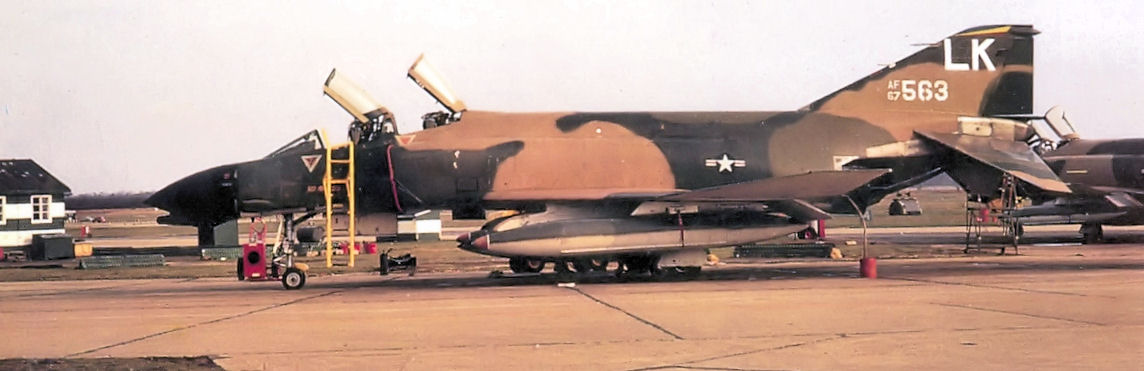
McDonnell F-4D Phantom II, serial 66-7563, of the 493d TFS, 1972. Note the "LK" tailcode and tri-color fin cap.

On 15 January 1960, the F-100s of the 48TFW arrived at RAF Lakenheath. The tactical components of the 48th TFW upon arrival at Lakenheath were 492d, 493d and 494th Fighter Squadrons.

The F-100s arrived from France still finished in bare metal with bright individual squadron markings, subsequently changed to a common tri-colour chevron (blue, yellow, red) flash on the tail (and nose), over bare metal. Around 1966-67 this was replaced with dull green-based S.E. Asia camouflage and no squadron markings. However, by 1970 individual squadron markings were re-introduced, firstly with large squadron tail-codes ('LR', 'LS' or 'LT') and shortly after colored fin tips were added.

- 492d Tactical Fighter Squadron (assigned tailcode 'LR', blue fin tip added later)
- 493d Tactical Fighter Squadron (assigned tailcode 'LS', yellow fin tip added later)
- 494th Tactical Fighter Squadron (assigned tailcode 'LT', red fin tip added later)

The wing and its fighters brought a new mission and the first permanent American presence to RAF Lakenheath. The base required a myriad of construction projects to support the mission. Maintenance and flying operations areas required conversions to support fighter operations, and the base needed the creation of a support structure for a permanent host unit.

East Germany's 1961 decision to build the Berlin Wall and the 1962 Cuban Missile Crisis increased Cold War tensions to an all-time high. In response, RAF Lakenheath was earmarked as a possible rotational base for SAC B-47 and B-52 aircraft throughout the Berlin Crisis, although no aircraft were actually deployed. Also in 1962, the 48th TFW came under the operational command of Third Air Force.

Between 1963 and 1972 the wing's F-100 fleet maintained its readiness by participating in a number of USAFE and NATO exercises training to react to possible aggression from the Soviet Union. They underwent a series of NATO tactical evaluations, for which they earned the wing their first Air Force Outstanding Unit Award, for the period from 1 July 1961 to 29 February 1964. The wing conducted several deployments to Turkey, Italy, Spain, and across the United Kingdom

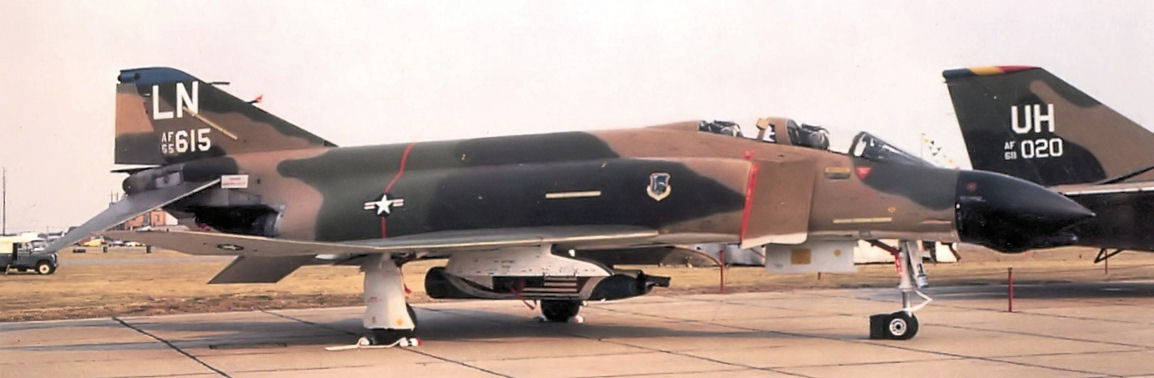
McDonnell F-4D Phantom II serial 65-0615, 492d Tactical Fighter Squadron (blue fin tip), 48th TFW, tail-code 'LN', 4th July 1976

On 1 October 1971, the 492d Tactical Fighter Squadron stood down from its NATO commitments, followed by the 493d on 1 December and the 494th on 1 February 1972. The period between 1972 and 1977 can be described as a five-year aircraft conversion. Beginning in late 1971 the 48th TFW started its conversion to the McDonnell Douglas F-4D Phantom II, with some aircraft being transferred from the 81st TFW at RAF Bentwaters. The conversion to the F-4D took several years, with the last F-100 departing in August 1974. The first F-4 Phantoms to arrive adopted a common tail code of "LK" with a tri-color fin tip, however this tail code lasted only a few months as in July / August 1972 the 48th TFW further recoded to "LN". As the numbers of F-4s increased, they were allocated to individual squadrons and gradually adopted individual squadron identifying fin cap colors of blue, yellow and red (492d, 493d, 494th respectively). The squadron conversion dates were:

- 492d TFS 1 October 1971 and 31 January 1972
- 493d TFS 1 December 1971 and April 1972
- 494th TFS 1 February 1972 and 25 July 1974

The F-4's service with the 48th TFW was relatively short as operation "Ready Switch" transferred the F-4D assets to the 474th TFW at Nellis AFB Nevada. The 474th sent their General Dynamics F-111A Aardvarks to the 366th TFW at Mountain Home AFB Idaho, and the 366th sent their F-111Fs to Lakenheath in early 1977. Unlike the previous F-4 transition, the F-111 change took place fairly quickly and without any significant problems. In fact, the wing received its third Air Force Outstanding Unit Award for such a smooth transition. Almost immediately after changing aircraft, the wing began a series of monthly exercises and deployments that took the Liberty Wing to Italy, Iran, Greece, and Pakistan.

A fourth fighter squadron, the 495th Tactical Fighter Squadron was activated with the 48th TFW on 1 April 1977 with a squadron tail color of green. This was 33 years to the day since the squadron's inactivation. The 495th's mission of functioning as a replacement training unit for the other three fighter squadrons made the 48th TFW unique in two ways. First, it created the 48th the only combat wing in USAFE with four squadrons. Furthermore, it made the 48th the only wing operating with its own replacement training unit. In the same year construction of the airfield's Hardened Aircraft Shelters (acronym: HAS, but commonly referred to as a TAB-VEE) began as part of a wider NATO effort.

By September 1979, the wing had flown the highest number of hours ever recorded in a fiscal year by an F-111 unit. This dedication culminated in the 48th's performance during a joint USAFE Operational Readiness Inspection and NATO Tactical Evaluation in March 1980. As a result, the Secretary of the Air Force selected the 48th TFW for its fourth Air Force Outstanding Unit Award.

In the early 1980s the wing struggled with aircraft shortages. Primarily, this resulted from the upgrade to the Pave Tack, a laser guided weapons delivery system. Each aircraft had to process through the upgrade facility at the Air Logistics Center in McClellan AFB, California. At the same time, the wing had to overcome supply shortages resulting from years of reduced military budgets in the late 1970s under the Carter administration.

=== Operation El Dorado Canyon ===
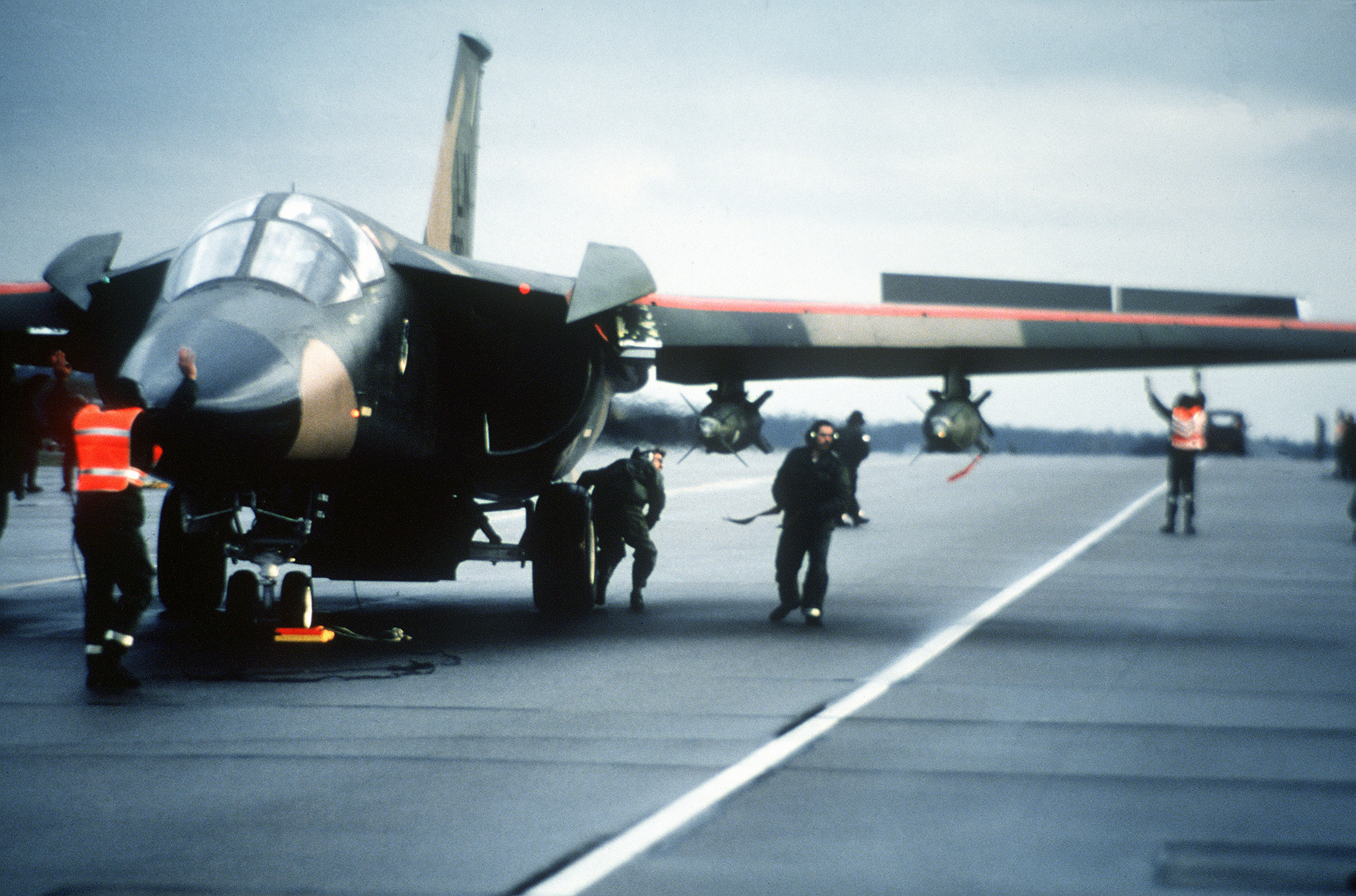
A 48th Tactical Fighter Wing F-111F being prepared for takeoff on 14 April 1986 at RAF Lakenheath

By the mid-1980s the Cold War was not the only American fear for national security; terrorists struck targets from bombing of US Marines in Beirut to Berlin, from Rome to Rotterdam. Some of these attacks were attributed to the Libyan government headed by Colonel Muammar Gaddafi. In retaliation, U.S. president Ronald Reagan ordered a strike against targets in Tripoli, which were carried out by the United States Navy Sixth Fleet and F-111s of the 48th Tactical Fighter Wing. The F-111Fs from Lakenheath were chosen for their capability to fly long distances and deliver laser-guided munitions with great accuracy.

At about 19:00 the evening of 14 April 1986, 24 F-111Fs departed Lakenheath's runway, six of which were airborne spares in the event malfunctions forced any of the primary aircraft to abort. In flights of four, aircrews flew south through the Straits of Gibraltar and began their orchestrated attack shortly after midnight on 15 April. They were targeted on Azziziyah Barracks, the Sidi Balal terrorist training camp, and Tripoli Airport. With the sky lit up from Tripoli's city lights, anti-aircraft tracers, and brilliant surface-to-air missile detonations, determined 48th TFW crews unleashed 60 tons of munitions, damaging their targets. In spite of the mission's success, the Wing experienced a major loss. As the strike force recovered at Lakenheath, both air and ground crews were given the somber news that Major Fernando Ribas (Utuado, Puerto Rico) pilot, and Weapons System Operator Captain Paul Lorence, were missing.

The grueling 14-hour flight took its toll. "Those guys were so fatigued, the crew chiefs literally had to pull some of the crews out of the cockpits", recalled CMSgt Richard O’Shaughnessy, then a Master Sergeant and weapons flight supervisor. "Most of them actually lost several pounds from sweating so much. When the guys pulled their helmets off, sweat literally poured down their foreheads and necks".

On 8 September 1986, US Navy Secretary John Lehman personally presented the Navy's Meritorious Unit Commendation to the 48th TFW for its participation in the operation. The 48th TFW is the only Air Force unit to have received this prestigious award. Likewise, General Charles L. Donnelly, Jr., commander-in-chief, USAFE, visited RAF Lakenheath on 17 February 1987 and presented decorations to those who participated in the operation. The ceremony ended with a presentation to Captain Lorence's widow Diane, followed by a missing man flyover.

=== To the Middle East, 1990–91 ===
In response to the Iraqi invasion of Kuwait on 2 August 1990, during the first week of August, Col Thomas J. Lennon, 48th Tactical Fighter Wing Commander, received a call from Headquarters, US States Air Force, asking if the 48th Tactical Fighter Wing was ready to deploy. Colonel Lennon built a team of 13 members from wing leadership, known as the "Lucky 13", and preparations began for the eventual movement of personnel and F-111s to Saudi Arabia.

On 25 August 1990, 18 F-111s took off from Lakenheath as the first USAFE unit to deploy. In this first group, nearly 500 men and women of the Liberty Wing departed. The 48th TFW deployed more than 60 aircraft and 1,500 personnel to Taif Air Base, Saudi Arabia. The 492d, 493d and 494th TFSs deployed, supplying 66 F-111Fs, which were in place by December 1990. Some aircrew & other members of the 495th TFS were deployed & dispersed throughout its 3 sister squadrons.

During the Operation Desert Storm air war 17 January-24 February 1991, and subsequent four-day ground war of 24–28 February the wing's F-111Fs flew thousands of sorties, unleashing precision-guided and unguided munitions on Iraqi armor, artillery, bridges, military airfields and command and control centers. The wing's crews even stopped the flow of oil contaminating the Persian Gulf by bombing a pumping installation purposefully damaged by retreating Iraqi forces.

Overall, the 48th TFW flew a total of 1919 combat sorties, totaling 2203 target hits. The Wing returned to RAF Lakenheath 13 May 1991.

=== Post Cold War era ===
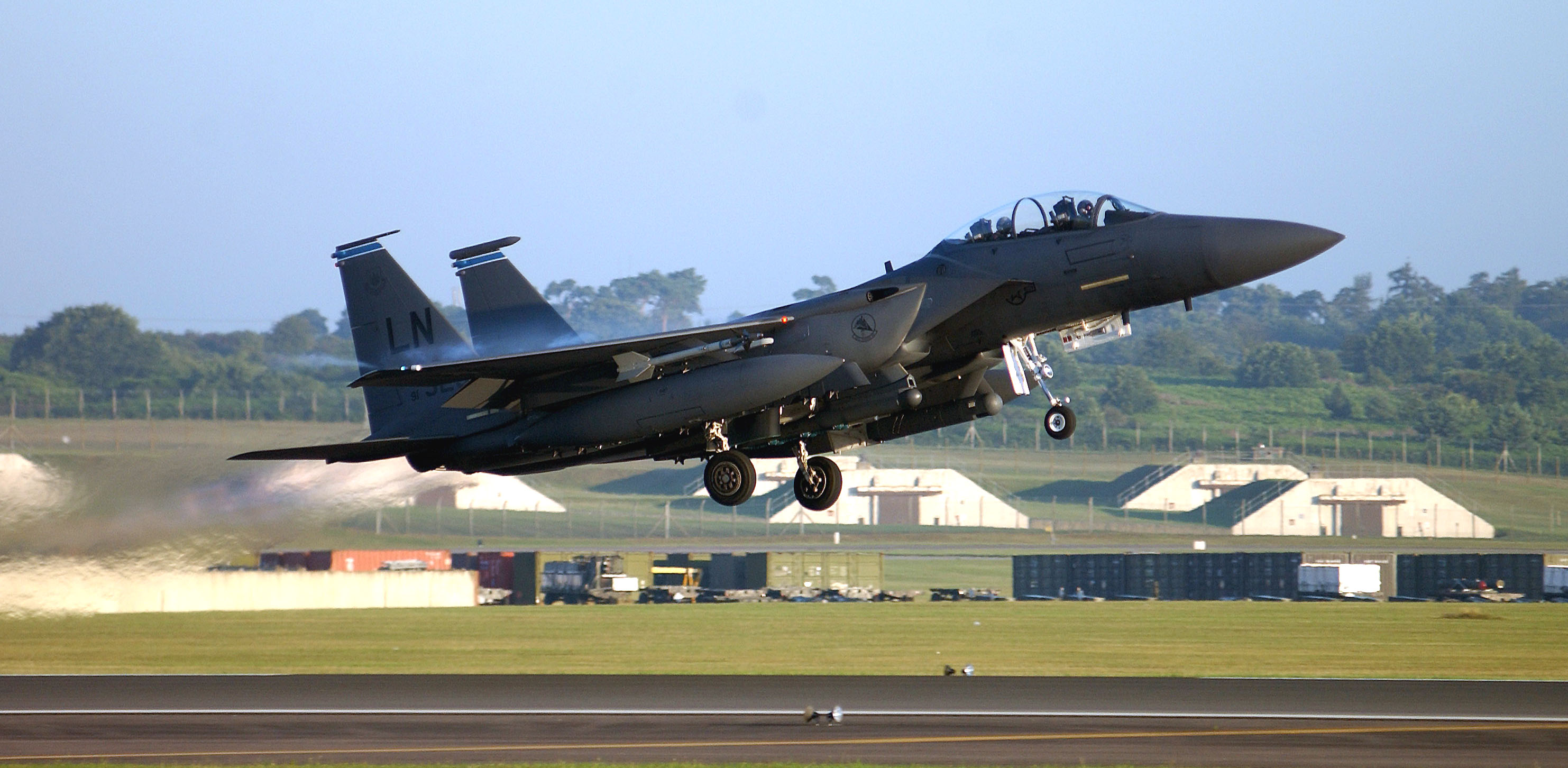
A 492d Fighter Squadron F-15E Eagle from Lakenheath lifts off from the airfield's runway

Incorporating the lessons learned during the desert operations, the Air Force directed changes that led to the Objective Wing Organization. Beginning in mid-1991, the 48th Tactical Fighter Wing began restructuring under this program, realigning its maintenance-fighter squadron workforce and establishing several command positions to include the 48th Logistics Group, 48th Medical Group, 48th Support Group, and 48th Operations Group (originally designated the 48th Fighter Group).

The program also redesignated many of the Air Force's units by dropping the "Tactical" from their names. Thus on 1 October 1991, the 48th Tactical Fighter Wing was redesignated the 48th Fighter Wing, and the 492d, 493d, 494th and 495th became simply Fighter Squadrons. The 495th FS inactivated on 13 December 1991.

In the midst of the organizational changes, the wing switched aircraft again, exchanging the F-111Fs for the F-15E Strike Eagle. On 21 February 1992, the first F-15E landed at Lakenheath, with the last F-111F departing for units within the US on 16 December 1992. The final F-15E arrived in June 1993 (actually early 2000s), and the wing achieved initial operational capability on 1 October 1993. With this mission change, the 493d Fighter Squadron inactivated on 1 January 1993, only to reactivate again on 1 January 1994. The squadron received its first maintenance trainer F-15C Eagle on 10 January 1994, then its full complement of F-15C & D aircraft by 22 July 1994. This marked the first time that the 48th had flown a specifically air-to-air weapon system, after flying for more than 50 years with an air-to-ground mission.

Since September 2001, in response to the terrorist attacks in the United States on 11 September 2001, various units of the 48th FW have deployed to Afghanistan to support Operation Enduring Freedom and to Iraq to support Operations Iraqi Freedom and New Dawn, and also to various other US allies such as South Korea.

The wing participated in Operation Odyssey Dawn in Libya in March 2011. One of the wing's F-15E aircraft crashed in Libya after an unapproved flight maneuver on 21 March 2011, but both crew members survived with minor injuries.

An F-15C Eagle from the 48th Fighter Wing crashed into the North Sea on 15 June 2020, killing the pilot on board.

On 1 October 2021, the 495th Fighter Squadron was reactivated as the 48th Fighter Wing's first F-35A unit.

In 2021, the 48th Fighter Wing became the first unit outside of the contiguous United States to operate the Lockheed Martin F-35A Lightning II, with two squadrons based at RAF Lakenheath.

== Lineage, assignments, components, bases, and aircraft ==
=== Lineage ===
- Established as 48th Fighter-Bomber Wing on 25 June 1952
- Activated on 10 July 1952
- Redesignated: 48th Tactical Fighter Wing on 8 July 1958
- Redesignated: 48th Fighter Wing on 1 October 1991

=== Assignments ===
- Twelfth Air Force, 10 July 1952
- United States Air Forces in Europe, 1 January 1958
- Third Air Force, 1 October 1959
- United States Air Forces in Europe, 12 October 1959
- Seventeenth Air Force, 15 November 1959
- Third Air Force, 15 January 1960
- Seventeenth Air Force, 1 July 1961
- Third Air Force, 1 September 1963
- United States Air Forces in Europe, 1 November 2005
- Third Air Force, 1 December 2006–

=== Components ===
Groups

- 48th Fighter-Bomber (later, 48th Operations) Group: 10 July 1952 – 8 December 1957; 31 March 1992–

Squadrons

- 492d Fighter-Bomber (later, 492d Tactical Fighter, 492d Fighter) Squadron: attached 15 March – 7 December 1957, assigned 8 December 1957 – 31 March 1992 (detached 20 November 1990 – 10 May 1991; December 1991 – March 1992)
- 493d Fighter-Bomber (later, 493d Tactical Fighter, 493d Fighter) Squadron: attached 15 March – 7 December 1957, assigned 8 December 1957 – 18 December 1992 (detached 25 August 1990 – 11 March 1991; March– June 1992)
- 494th Fighter-Bomber (later, 494th Tactical Fighter, 494th Fighter) Squadron: attached 15 March – 7 December 1957, assigned 8 December 1957 – 31 March 1992 (detached 2 September 1990 – 15 March 1991; September– December 1991)
- 495th Tactical Fighter Squadron: 1 April 1977 – 13 December 1991
- 509th Fighter-Bomber Squadron: attached 5 October 1957 – 15 January 1958.

=== Bases assigned ===
- Chaumont-Semoutiers Air Base, France, 10 July 1952 – 15 January 1960
- RAF Lakenheath, England, since 15 January 1960

=== Aircraft ===
- Republic F-84G Thunderjet
- North American F-86F Sabre
- North American F-100D Super Sabre
- McDonnell-Douglas F-4D Phantom II
- General Dynamics F-111F Aardvark
- McDonnell Douglas F-15C/D Eagle
- McDonnell Douglas F-15E Strike Eagle
- Lockheed Martin F-35A Lightning II (From December 2021)

== Awards and decorations ==
- Operation El Dorado Canyon
- 1991 Gulf War (Defense of Saudi Arabia; Liberation of Kuwait)
- Kosovo Air Campaign
- Afghanistan Campaign
- Global War on Terrorism
- Iraq Campaign
- Operation Odyssey Dawn
- Navy Meritorious Unit Commendation
- Air Force Outstanding Unit Award with Combat "V" Device
- Air Force Outstanding Unit Award (19x)

== See also ==
- List of wings of the United States Air Force
- United States Air Force in the United Kingdom
