= 495th Fighter Squadron =

495th Fighter Squadron

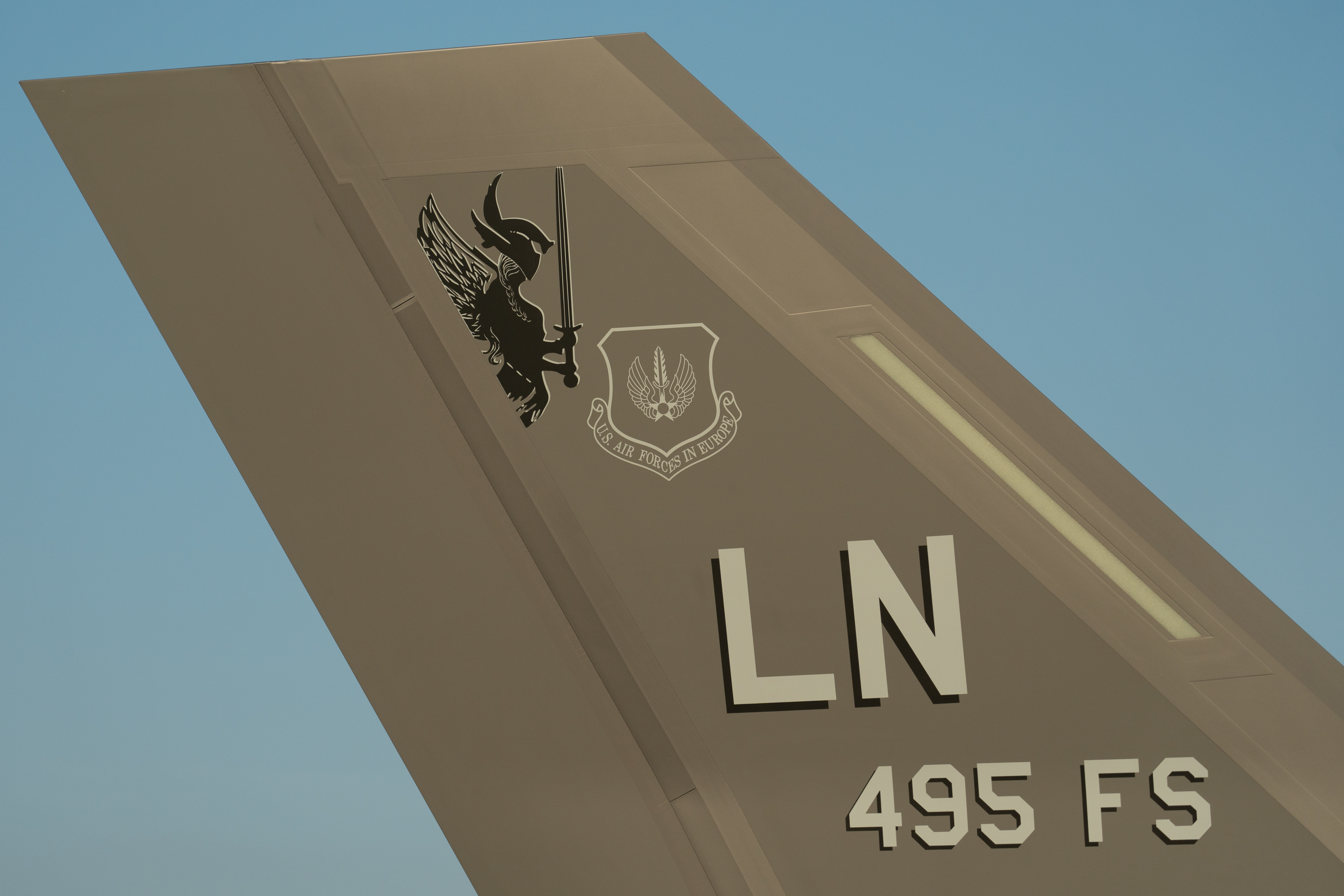
- The squadron's markings on the tail of an F-35A parked at RAF Lakenheath in 2022
- Active: 1941–; 1977–1991; 2021–present
- Country: United States
- Branch: United States Air Force
- Role: Fighter
- Part of: United States Air Forces in Europe – Air Forces Africa
- Garrison/HQ: RAF Lakenheath, United Kingdom
- Nicknames: Valkyries; Thundervarks (1977–1991)
- Motto: Mala Ipsa Nova (Latin for 'Bad News Itself')
- Colors: Green

Insignia
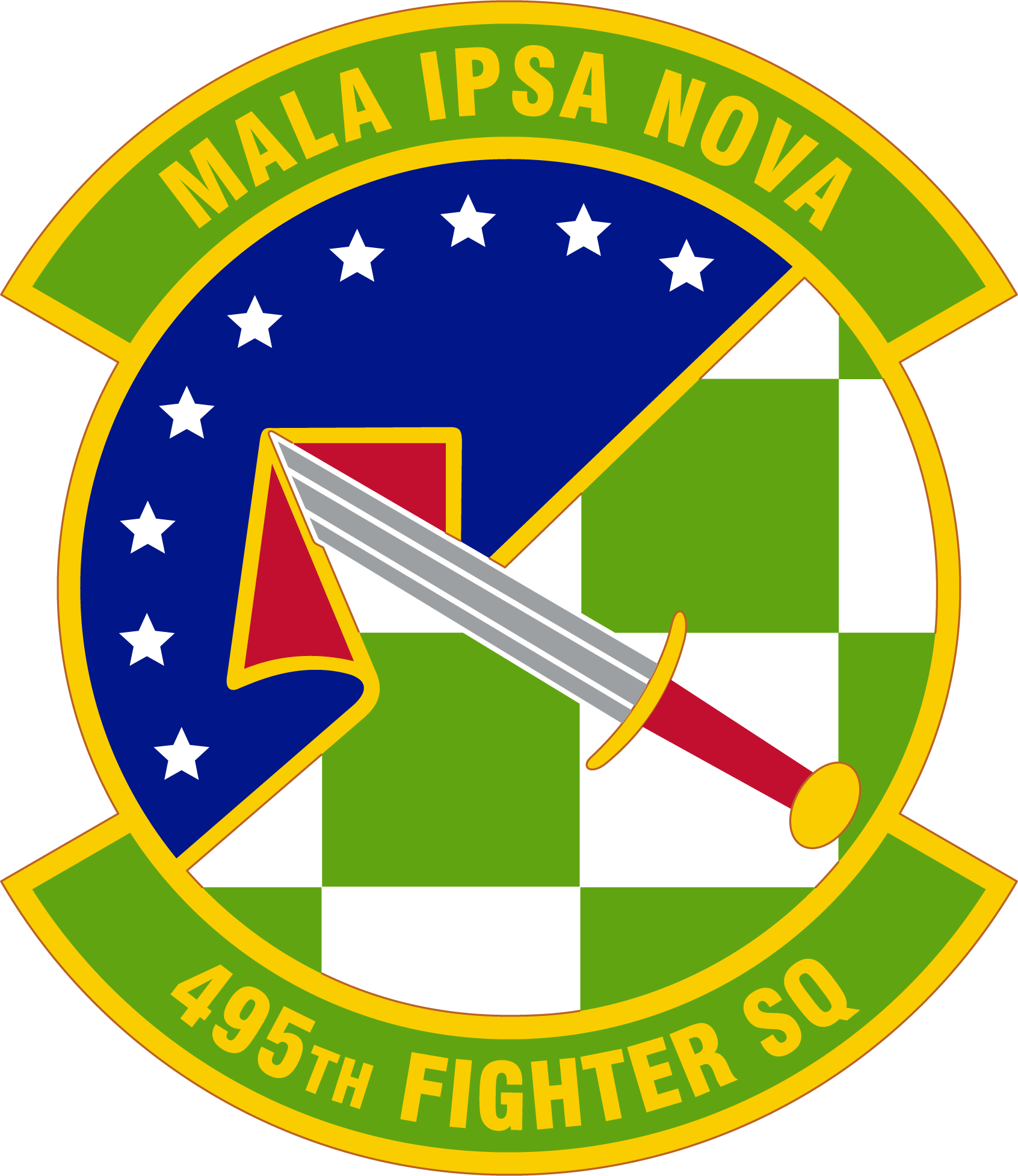
- 495th Fighter Squadron emblem

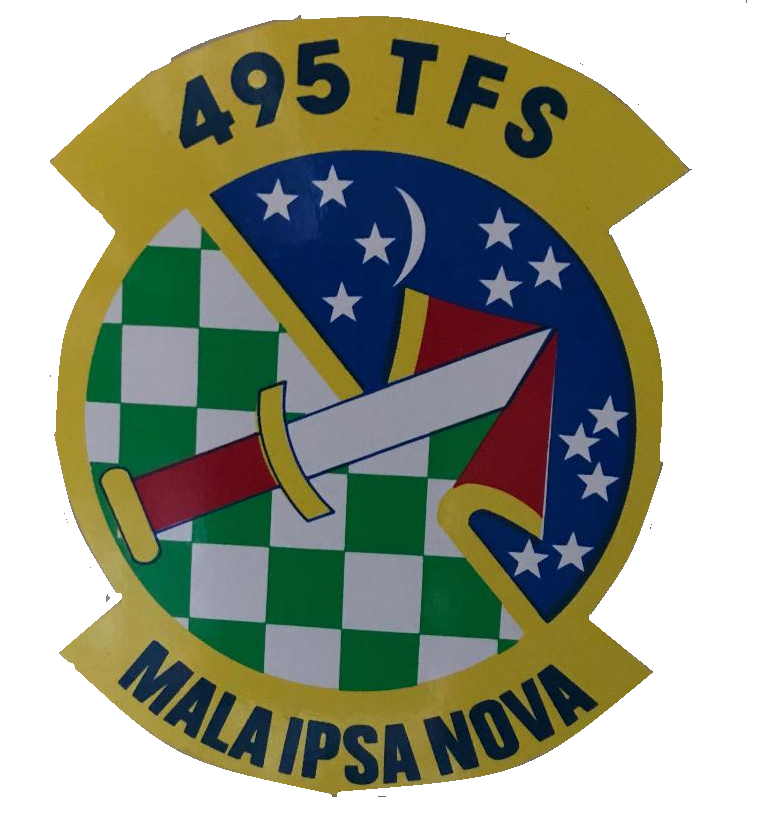
- 495th Tactical Fighter Squadron emblem
- Tail code: LN (since 1977)

Aircraft flown
- Fighter: F-35A Lightning II

The 495th Fighter Squadron is part of the 48th Fighter Wing at RAF Lakenheath, England, where they operate the Lockheed Martin F-35 Lightning II. The squadron was originally activated as the 9th Reconnaissance Squadron in 1941, as the United States Army Air Corps built up prior to the entry of the United States into World War II. Later that year, it was redesignated the 88th Bombardment SquadronFollowing the attack on Pearl Harbor, it briefly engaged in the antisubmarine campaign before becoming a Replacement Training Unit. In 1943, it became the 495th Fighter-Bomber Squadron and trained for overseas deployment, but was disbanded in April 1944 before moving overseas.

The unit was reactivated in 1977 as the 495th Tactical Fighter Squadron at RAF Lakenheath, England, flying General Dynamics F-111F Aardvarks. It was inactivated in 1991. In 2021, it was activated as the 495th Fighter Squadron and became the first overseas United States Air Force squadron to operate the Lockheed Martin F-35A Lightning II.

== Mission ==
The primary mission of the 495th is to deter aggression against the US and its NATO allies.

== History ==
=== World War II ===
A-20 Havoc, first plane to equip the squadron

The squadron was first activated Hunter Field, Georgia in January 1941 as the 9th Reconnaissance Squadron, one of the four original squadrons assigned to the 48th Bombardment Group and equipped with Douglas A-20 Havoc bombers. In August, the squadron was redesignated the 88th Bombardment Squadron as it trained for operation as a light bomber unit. Following the attack on Pearl Harbor, the squadron briefly flew antisubmarine patrols, from March to April 1942.

In June 1942, the squadron moved to Key Field, Mississippi, where it replaced its Havocs with Vultee A-35 Vengeances and became a Replacement Training Unit (RTU). RTUs were oversized units which trained aircrews prior to their deployment to combat theaters. In August 1943, along with other Army Air Forces single-engine light and dive bomber units, the squadron became a fighter-bomber unit as the 495th Fighter-Bomber Squadron.

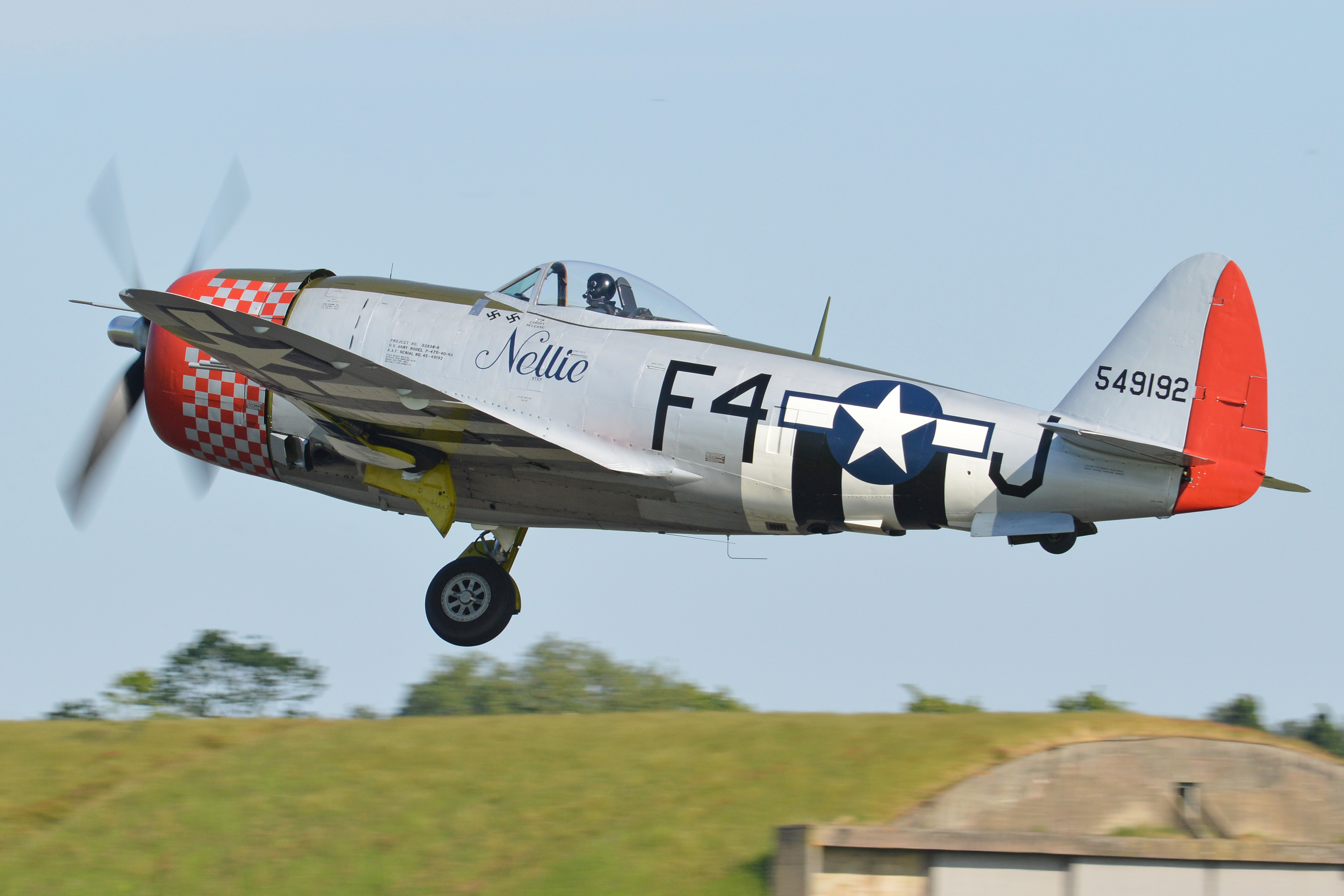
A Republic P-47D Thunderbolt in 48th Fighter Group markings.

Five days after this redesignation, the squadron ended its RTU mission at Key Field and moved to William Northern Army Air Field, Tennessee, and re-equipped with Bell P-39 Airacobras and Curtiss P-40 Warhawks. It began to prepare for combat, moving to Walterboro Army Air Field, South Carolina in January 1944, where it received Republic P-47 Thunderbolts. In April, the 48th Fighter-Bomber Group reorganized from four to three squadrons as it prepared for movement overseas, and the 495th was moved to Galveston Army Air Field, Texas, where it was disbanded on 1 April.

=== Cold War ===
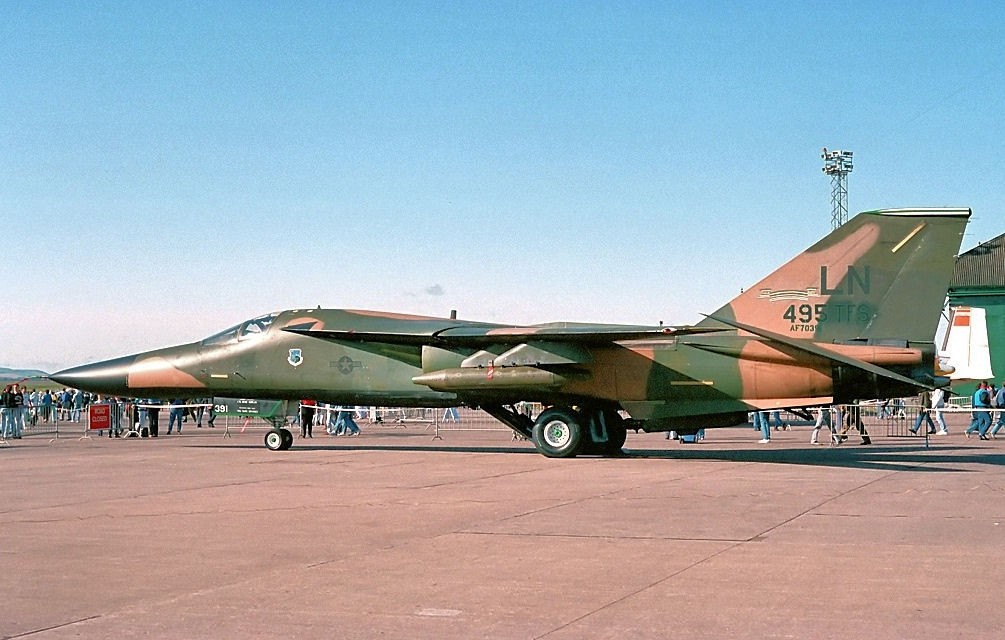
F-111F Aardvark 70-2391 of the 495th. The ribbon on tail is for Operation El Dorado Canyon raid on Libya in April 1986.

The 495th was reactivated on 1 April 1977 as the 495th Tactical Fighter Squadron, becoming the fourth tactical fighter squadron with the 48th Tactical Fighter Wing at RAF Lakenheath, England. This was 33 years to the day since the squadron’s inactivation. The 495th mission was as a replacement training unit for General Dynamics F-111F Aardvark pilots and Weapon Systems Officers (WSO) assigned to the three combat fighter squadron at RAF Lakenheath.

The 495th participated in Operation El Dorado Canyon on 15 April 1986, the air raid against Muammar Gaddafi's Libyan government due to its involvement in the West Berlin discotheque bombing ten days prior. The mission was successful, however one of the squadron's F-111Fs (70-2389), callsign 'Karma 52', was shot down over the Gulf of Sidra, killing pilot Capt. Fernando L. Ribas-Dominicci and WSO Capt. Paul F. Lorence.

In 1990, the 495th deployed crews to augment the three deployed squadrons from the 48 TFW to Taif Air Base, Saudi Arabia, as part of Operation Desert Shield which was in response to the Iraqi invasion of Kuwait. The squadron suffered a loss on 15 October 1990, when F-111F 74-0183 crashed during a night time training mission, killing pilot Capt. Art Reid and WSO Capt. Thomas Caldwell.

The 495th was inactivated on 13 December 1991, shortly before retirement of the F-111F Aardvark at RAF Lakenheath.

=== Modern era ===
On 15 September 2020, the USAF announced that the 495th Fighter Squadron would be reactivated as first F-35A unit of the 48th Fighter Wing at RAF Lakenheath. On 6 April 2021, the unit was officially redesignated as the 495th Fighter Squadron.

The 495th was reactivated on 1 October 2021, with 27 aircraft and roughly 60 personnel. The "Valkyries" received their first four F-35As (19-5473, 19-5474, 19-5475, and 19-5476) on 15 December 2021. They received their next three F-35As (19-5484, 19-5485 and 19-5486) on 10 February 2022. The third batch, consisting of two aircraft, including the 493rd FS and 495th commanders’ jets (19-5493 and 19-5495) arrived on 15 April 2022. 19-5493 was integrated with the 495th until the 493rd FS reactivated with the F-35A Lightning II.

== Lineage ==
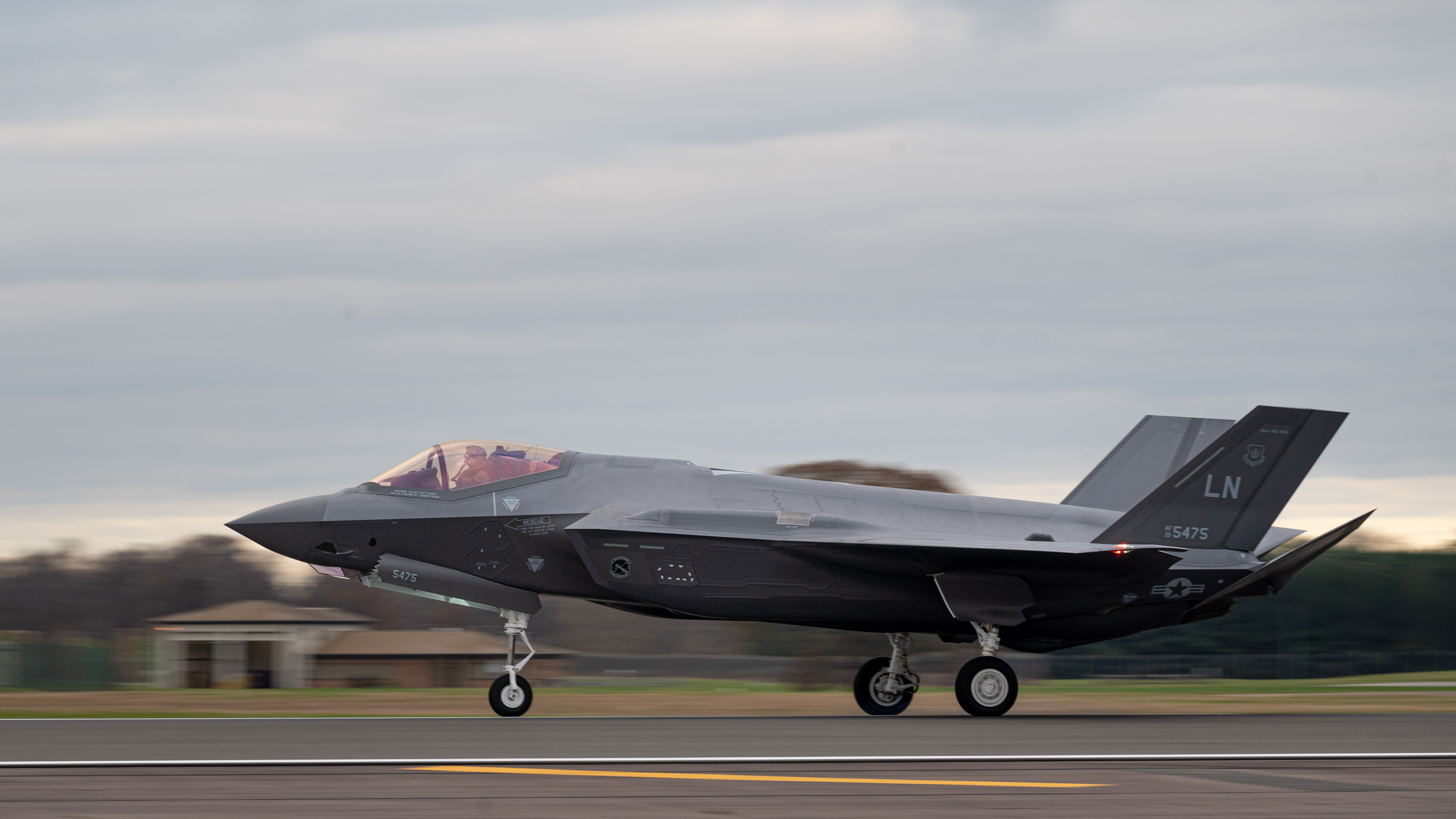
A F-35A of the 495th land at RAF Lakenheath, 15 December 2021.

- Constituted as the 9th Reconnaissance Squadron (Light) on 20 November 1940.

Activated on 15 January 1941
Redesignated 88th Bombardment Squadron (Light) on 14 August 1941
Redesignated 88th Bombardment Squadron (Dive) on 28 August 1942
Redesignated 495th Fighter-Bomber Squadron on 10 August 1943
Disbanded on 1 April 1944
Reconstituted, redesignated: 495th Tactical Fighter Squadron and activated on 1 April 1977 (not operational until 29 July 1977)
Inactivated on 13 December 1991
Redesignated 495th Fighter Squadron on 6 April 2021
Activated on 1 October 2021

=== Assignments ===
- 48th Bombardment Group (later 48th Fighter-Bomber Group

Assigned on 14 August 1941

- 407th Fighter-Bomber Group, March 1944 – 1 April 1944
- 48th Tactical Fighter Wing, 1 April 1977 – 13 December 1991
- 48th Operations Group, 1 October 2021 – present

=== Stations ===
- Savannah Army Air Base, Georgia, 15 January 1941
- Will Rogers Field, Oklahoma 26 May 1941
- Savannah Army Air Base, Georgia. 7 February 1942
- Key Field, Mississippi, 28 June 1942
- William Northern Field, Tennessee, 20 August 1943
- Galveston Army Air Field, Texas, March 1944 – 1 April 1944
- RAF Lakenheath, Suffolk, England, 1 April 1977 – 13 December 1991
- RAF Lakenheath, Suffolk, England, 1 October 2021 – present

=== Aircraft ===
- Douglas B-18 Bolo (1941)
- Douglas A-20 Havoc (1941–1943)
- Bell P-39 Airacobra (1942–1944)
- Curtiss P-40 Warhawk (1942–1944)
- Vultee A-35 Vengeance (1943)
- Douglas A-24 Banshee (1943)
- Republic P-47 Thunderbolt (1944)
- General Dynamics F-111F Aardvark (1977–1991)
- Lockheed Martin F-35A Lightning II (2021–present)
