= Naval Striking and Support Forces NATO =

Naval command of NATO's Allied Command Operations

- Coat of arms
- Founded: 1 July 2004
- Location: Oeiras, Portugal
- Website: sfn.nato.int

Commanders
- Commander: Vice Admiral Jeffrey T. Anderson, USN
- Deputy Commander: Rear Admiral Craig Wood RN

Locations of NATO's two strategic commands — Allied Command Transformation (ACT) with its subordinate centres (blue marks) and Allied Command Operations (ACO), headquartered at Supreme Headquarters Allied Powers Europe (SHAPE) and including its subordinate and joint force commands (red marks).

Naval Striking and Support Forces NATO (STRIKFORNATO) is a naval command of Allied Command Operations of North Atlantic Treaty Organization (NATO). It is part of the NATO Force Structure. STRIKFORNATO is commanded by the Commander of the United States Sixth Fleet, and it is the only command capable of leading an expanded maritime task force. Its predecessor was Naval Striking and Support Forces Southern Europe (STRIKFORSOUTH); the name change took place in 2004.

== History ==
A U.S. Navy commander-in-chief for Allied Forces Southern Europe was named in 1951. But due to difficult negotiations over the British retaining some control of the Western-Eastern sea lanes in the Mediterranean, the establishment of Allied Forces Southern Europe itself was delayed.

Due to politics, command of the naval forces in the region was eventually split. The Atomic Energy Act of 1946 (the McMahon Act) led to significant controversy during debates over NATO's military command structure. The United States Sixth Fleet has never been allowed to be placed anywhere but directly under an American commander — Commander-in-Chief, Allied Forces Southern Europe —because the dominant legal interpretation of the McMahon Act has been that nuclear striking forces cannot be controlled by non-US commanders. This was the reason why the Sixth Fleet, in its NATO guise as Naval Striking and Support Force, South, was placed under American control rather than Allied Forces Mediterranean when the European commands were agreed at the same time.

Most of the NATO allies' naval forces in the Mediterranean were placed under an Italian admiral and formed Allied Naval Forces Southern Europe, at Naples. But due to the nuclear control restrictions, the United States Sixth Fleet was arranged to reported directly to CinCAFSOUTH, supported by a separate headquarters named Naval Striking and Support Forces Southern Europe (STRIKFORSOUTH). Commander-in-Chief, Allied Forces Southern Europe was able to give the order establishing this new separate headquarters in December 1952. It became a Principal Subordinate Commander under CINCSOUTH.

The command was a dual assignment for the vice admiral commanding the U.S. Sixth Fleet. The STRIKFORSOUTH staff was initially composed principally of U.S. Navy personnel because forces earmarked for STRIKFORSOUTH were from the U.S. Other allied personnel from France, Greece, Italy, Turkey, and the United Kingdom came on board to better mesh with other Mediterranean NATO commanders in planning and conducting exercises and training. Its area of responsibility (AOR) was the entire Mediterranean theatre, from the Straits of Gibraltar to the Easter Mediterranean and Black Sea.

In 1953 the command set up shore spaces at the NATO AFSOUTH complex in the Neapolitan neighborhood of Bagnoli which had been one of the Fascist regime's public housing architectural showcases. Its staff occupied the top floor of one of the four main subordinate buildings on the main quadrangle.

STRIKFORSOUTH's primary mission in all-out war would have been to participate in NATO's counter-offensive by launching deep conventional air attacks or close air support missions in conjunction with any amphibious operations. As the Soviets built up their naval forces in the Mediterranean in the 1960s and 1970s, STRIKFORSOUTH served as a major advisor to Allied Forces Southern Europe (AFSOUTH) and Supreme Headquarters Allied Powers Europe (SHAPE) in the area of Nuclear Strike Planning. The command honed its readiness through these years by planning and conducting semi-annual large-scale NATO amphibious exercises as well as numerous small-scale exercises in various disciplines.

STRIKFORSOUTH coordinated NATO support for the security of the lines of supply through the Mediterranean for Coalition forces during the Gulf War in 1990 and 1991.

As the Soviet threat diminished in the early 1990s, attention shifted towards internal conflicts in the Balkans, the Middle East, and Africa. As a result, STRIKFORSOUTH was directly responsible in developing and refining the Multinational Amphibious Task Force (MNATF) concept.

The conflict in the Balkans saw STRIKFORSOUTH contributing planning support and liaison officers to AFSOUTH operations. This led to the establishment of the Kosovo Verification Coordination Centre in the former Yugoslavia Republic of Macedonia by STRIKFORSOUTH personnel. COMSTRIKFORSOUTH assumed command of NATO Carrier Forces during Operation ALLIED FORCE.

=== Exercise Trident Juncture 2018 ===
From 25 October to 7 November 2018, STRIKFORNATO deployed on board USS Mount Whitney—Afloat Command Platform (ACP) of STRIKFORNATO—and performed in its role as a NATO Expanded Task Force (NETF) providing command and control of multiple strike groups which included II Marine Expeditionary Force (II MEF), 2nd Marine Expeditionary Brigade (2nd MEB), 24th Marine Expeditionary Unit (24th MEU), Expeditionary Strike Group 2 (ESG 2), a Canadian/British Surface Action Group, a Norwegian Surface Action Group and mine countermeasures assets, a Norwegian submarine, and Carrier Strike Group 8 USS Harry S. Truman for a limited duration of exercise control. STRIKFORNATO commanded more than 20 ships operating in the North and Norwegian seas and troops ashore in Norway. This exercise "tests NATO's collective response to an armed attack against one ally, invoking Article 5 of the North Atlantic Treaty" which states that "an armed attack against one or more of [the Parties] in Europe or North America shall be considered an attack against them all."

== List of commanders ==
COMSTRIKFORSOUTH 50th Anniversary (1953–2003)

1. 15 March 1953 – 6 March 1954 VADM John H. Cassady
2. 6 March 1954 – 25 March 1955 VADM Thomas S. Combs
3. 26 March 1955 – 1 April 1956 VADM Ralph A. Ofstie
4. 2 April 1956 – 3 August 1956 VADM Harry D. Felt
5. 4 August 1956 – 29 September 1958 VADM Charles R. Brown
6. 30 September 1958 – 13 September 1959 VADM Clarence E. Ekstrom
7. 14 September 1959 – 12 July 1961 VADM George W. Anderson
8. 13 July 1961 – 17 March 1963 VADM David L. McDonald
9. 18 March 1963 – 1 June 1964 VADM William E. Gentner
10. 2 June 1964 – 9 May 1966 VADM William E. Ellis
11. 10 May 1966 – 4 April 1967 VADM Frederick L. Ashworth
12. 5 April 1967 – 13 August 1968 VADM William I. Martin
13. 14 August 1968 – 27 August 1970 VADM David C. Richardson
14. 28 August 1970 – 19 September 1971 VADM Isaac C. Kidd
15. 20 September 1971 – 10 June 1973 VADM Gerald E. Miller
16. 11 June 1973 – September 1974 VADM Daniel J. Murphy
17. September 1974 – August 1976 VADM Frederick C. Turner
18. August 1976 – September 1978 VADM Harry D. Train
19. September 1978 – July 1979 VADM James D. Watkins
20. July 1979 – June 1981 VADM William N. Small
21. June 1981 – June 1983 VADM William H. Rowden
22. July 1983 – February 1985 VADM Edward H. Martin
23. February 1985 – June 1986 VADM Frank B. Kelso, II
24. June 1986 – August 1988 VADM Kendall E. Moranville
25. 1 August 1988 – November 1990 VADM James D. Williams
26. November 1990 – July 1992 VADM William A. Owens
27. July 1992 – December 1993 VADM Thomas J. Lopez
28. December 1993 – March 1995 VADM Joseph W. Prueher
29. March 1995 – 11 July 1996 VADM Donald L. Pilling
30. 12 July 1996 – July 1998 VADM Charles S. Abbot
31. July 1998 – 28 September 2000 VADM Daniel J. Murphy Jr.
32. 29 September 2000 – 22 October 2001 VADM Gregory G. Johnson
33. 23 October 2001 – 4 November 2003 VADM Scott A. Fry

COMSTRIKFORNATO (2004–present)

1. 5 November 2003 – 9 May 2005 VADM Henry G. Ulrich III
2. 10 May 2005 – 6 June 2005 RADM David J. Cooke MBE
3. 7 June 2005 – 20 September 2007 VADM John D. Stufflebeem
4. 21 September 2007 – 10 August 2008 VADM James A. Winnefeld Jr.
5. 11 August 2008 – 19 November 2009 VADM Bruce W. Clingan
6. 20 November 2009 – 3 October 2011 VADM Harry B. Harris Jr.
7. 4 October 2011 – 8 October 2013 VADM Frank C. Pandolfe
8. 8 October 2013 – 14 December 2014 VADM Philip S. Davidson
9. 14 December 2014 – 28 October 2016 VADM James G. Foggo
10. 28 October 2016 – 1 March 2018 VADM Christopher W. Grady
11. 1 March 2018 – 1 July 2020 VADM Lisa M. Franchetti
12. 1 July 2020 – September 2022 VADM Eugene H. Black III
13. 1 September 2022 – 20 September 2024 VADM Thomas E. Ishee
14. 20 September 2024 – Present VADM Jeffrey T. Anderson

== Notes ==
- Maloney, Sean M. (1991). Securing Command of the Sea: NATO Naval Planning, 1948–1954 (Ph.D.). University of New Brunswick.
