= Admiral Black =

Admiral Black may refer to:

- Barry Black (born 1948), U.S. Navy rear admiral
- Eugene H. Black III (born c. 1964), U.S. Navy vice admiral
- Jeremy Black (Royal Navy officer) (1932–2015), British Royal Navy admiral
- Admiral Black, a fictional admiral in the TV series Star Trek
