= USS Springfield (CL-66) =

US Navy light cruiser ship

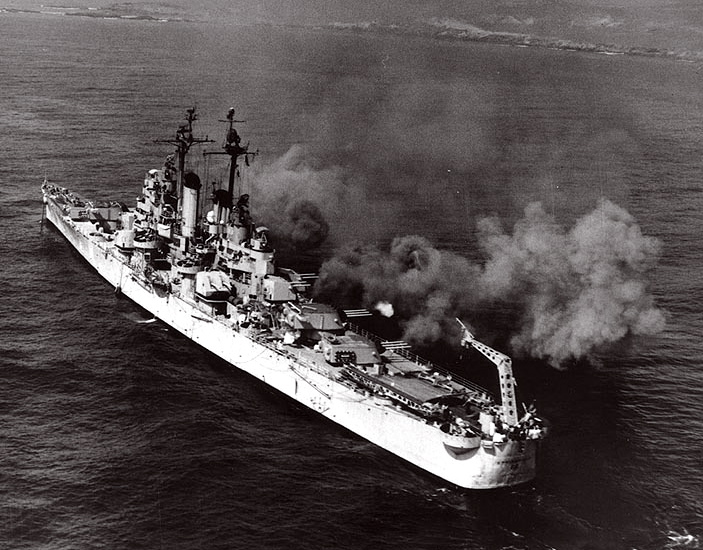
- Springfield during gunnery practice in the late 1940s

History

United States
- Name: Springfield
- Namesake: City of Springfield, Illinois
- Builder: Fore River Shipyard
- Laid down: 13 February 1943
- Launched: 9 March 1944
- Commissioned: 9 September 1944
- Decommissioned: 15 May 1974
- Stricken: 31 July 1980
- Fate: Sold, 11 March 1980

General characteristics
- Class & type: Cleveland-class light cruiser
- Displacement: Standard: 11,744 long tons (11,932 t); Full load: 14,131 long tons (14,358 t)
- Length: 610 ft 1 in (185.95 m)
- Beam: 66 ft 4 in (20.22 m)
- Draft: 24 ft 6 in (7.47 m)
- Installed power: 4 × Babcock & Wilcox boilers; 100,000 shp (75,000 kW)
- Propulsion: 4 × steam turbines; 4 × screw propellers
- Speed: 32.5 knots (60.2 km/h; 37.4 mph)
- Range: 11,000 nmi (20,000 km; 13,000 mi) at 15 kn (28 km/h; 17 mph)
- Complement: 1,285 officers and enlisted
- Armament: 12 × 6 in (152 mm) Mark 16 guns; 12 × 5 in (127 mm)/38 caliber guns; 24 × 40 mm (1.6 in) Bofors anti-aircraft guns; 21 × 20 mm (0.79 in) Oerlikon anti-aircraft guns
- Armor: Belt: 3.5–5 in (89–127 mm); Deck: 2 in (51 mm); Barbettes: 6 in (152 mm); Turrets: 6 in (152 mm); Conning Tower: 5 in (127 mm)
- Aircraft carried: 4 × floatplanes
- Aviation facilities: 2 × stern catapults

General characteristics (1960 rebuild)
- Class & type: Providence-class guided missile cruiser
- Displacement: 15,025 long tons (15,266 t)
- Armament: 3 × 6-inch/47 caliber Mark 16 guns; 2 × 5-inch/38 caliber anti-aircraft guns; 1 × Mark 9 RIM-2 Terrier missile launcher

USS Springfield (hull number: CL-66) was a Cleveland-class light cruiser of the United States Navy, which were built during World War II. The class was designed as a development of the earlier Brooklyn-class cruisers, the size of which had been limited by the First London Naval Treaty. The start of the war led to the dissolution of the treaty system, but the dramatic need for new vessels precluded a new design, so the Clevelands used the same hull as their predecessors, but were significantly heavier. The Clevelands carried a main battery of twelve 6-inch (152 mm) guns in four three-gun turrets, along with a secondary armament of twelve 5 in (127 mm) dual-purpose guns. They had a top speed of 32.5 knots (60.2 km/h; 37.4 mph).

She was the third US Navy ship to be named after Springfield, Illinois. Commissioned in 1944, she served briefly in the Atlantic before transferring to the Pacific. There she served with fast carrier task forces, primarily in an anti-aircraft role, but also in a shore bombardment role in the last stages of the Pacific War. She earned two battle stars for wartime service. Like all but one of her sister ships, she was decommissioned and laid up soon after the end of World War II.

In the late 1950s she was one of three Cleveland-class ships to be converted into Providence-class guided missile cruisers. As part of this conversion, she was modified to become a flagship, which involved expanding her forward superstructure and removing most of her forward armament. She was recommissioned in 1960 as CLG-7 (later redesignated as CG-7). In her second career, she served entirely in the Atlantic and Mediterranean. She was decommissioned for the final time in 1974 and sold for scrap six years later.

== Design ==
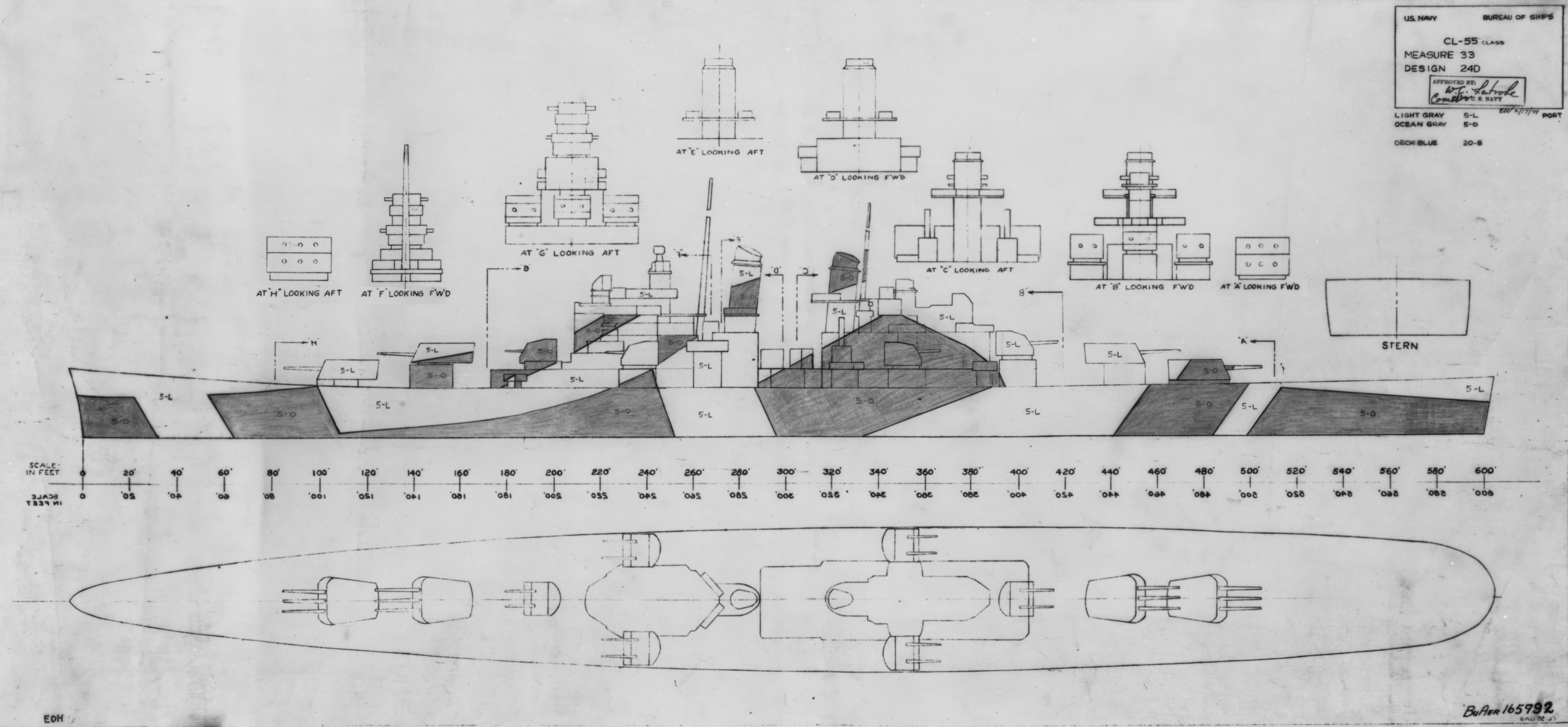
Depiction of the Cleveland class, showing the plan and profile

The Cleveland-class light cruisers traced their origin to design work done in the late 1930s; at the time, light cruiser displacement was limited to 8,000 long tons (8,100 t) by the Second London Naval Treaty. Following the start of World War II in September 1939, Britain announced it would suspend the treaty for the duration of the conflict, a decision the US Navy quickly followed. Though still neutral, the United States recognized that war was likely and the urgent need for additional ships ruled out an entirely new design, so the Clevelands were a close development of the earlier Brooklyn-class cruisers, the chief difference being the substitution of a two-gun 5 in (127 mm) dual-purpose gun mount for one of the main battery 6 in (152 mm) gun turrets.

Springfield was 610 feet 1 inch (186 m) long overall and had a beam of 66 ft 4 in (20.22 m) and a draft of 24 ft 6 in (7.47 m). Her standard displacement amounted to 11,744 long tons (11,932 t) and increased to 14,131 long tons (14,358 t) at full load. The ship was powered by four General Electric steam turbines, each driving one propeller shaft, using steam provided by four oil-fired Babcock & Wilcox boilers. Rated at 100,000 shaft horsepower (75,000 kW), the turbines were intended to give a top speed of 32.5 knots (60.2 km/h; 37.4 mph). Her crew numbered 1285 officers and enlisted men.

The ship was armed with a main battery of twelve 6 in /47-caliber Mark 16 guns (Note: /47 refers to the length of the gun in terms of calibers. A /47 gun is 47 times long as it is in bore diameter.) in four 3-gun turrets on the centerline. Two were placed forward in a superfiring pair; the other two turrets were placed aft of the superstructure in another superfiring pair. The secondary battery consisted of twelve 5 in (127 mm) /38-caliber dual-purpose guns mounted in twin turrets.Two of these were placed on the centerline, one directly behind the forward main turrets and the other just forward of the aft turrets. Two more were placed abreast of the conning tower and the other pair on either side of the aft superstructure. Anti-aircraft defense consisted of twenty-four Bofors 40 mm (1.6 in) guns in four quadruple and four double mounts and twenty-one Oerlikon 20 mm (0.79 in) guns in single mounts.

The ship's belt armor ranged in thickness from 3.5 to 5 in (89 to 127 mm), with the thicker section amidships where it protected the ammunition magazines and propulsion machinery spaces. Her deck armor was 2 in (51 mm) thick. The main battery turrets were protected with 6.5 in (170 mm) faces and 3 in (76 mm) sides and tops, and they were supported by barbettes 6 inches thick. Springfield's conning tower had 5-inch sides.

== Service history ==
=== World War II ===
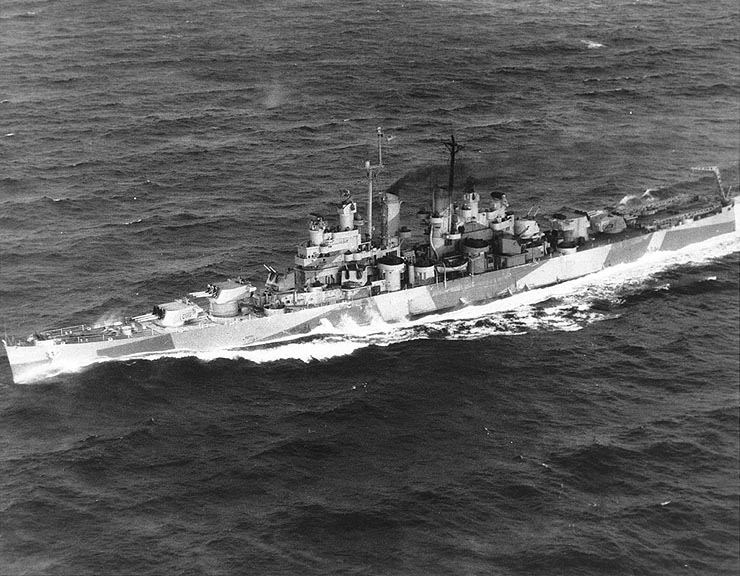
Springfield off Boston, January 1945

The keel for Springfield was laid down at the Bethlehem Shipbuilding Corporation shipyard in Quincy, Massachusetts on 13 February 1943. She was launched on 9 March 1944 and was completed exactly six months later, being commissioned on 9 September. The ship departed on 7 November to begin her shakedown cruise, stopping first in Norfolk, Virginia, on 9 November. She thereafter conducted shooting practice in Chesapeake Bay for a few days before continuing on to the British West Indies in the Caribbean Sea. On 21 November, she reached Gulf of Paria, Trinidad, and cruised in the area until 21 December, when she sailed north for Boston, her initial shakedown complete.

On 10 January 1945, Springfield left Boston for training to prepare her crew for combat operations during World War II. These were held off Bermuda in the Caribbean, and they were completed by 13 January, at which point the ship sailed for Norfolk. Over the following ten days, the ship participated in further shooting practice in the Chesapeake, and her crew completed basic maintenance tasks while in port. On the morning of 23 January, the ship left the harbor as part of Task Group 21.5, the escort for the heavy cruiser Quincy, which was carrying President Franklin D. Roosevelt to Malta, on his way to the Yalta Conference. Five days later, the ships reached a point approximately 300 nautical miles (560 km; 350 mi) south of the Azores, and a second escort group relieved TG 21.5, permitting Springfield to be detached to join the Allied forces fighting Japan in the Pacific War. She passed through the Panama Canal on 5 February and continued on to Pearl Harbor, Hawaii, arriving eleven days later.

==== Battle of Okinawa ====
Springfield remained in Pearl Harbor for five days, loading ammunition, fuel, and other supplies in preparation for her deployment to the western Pacific. During this period, her anti-aircraft gunners were given shooting practice. She thereafter got underway for the combat zone, stopping in Eniwetok on 2 March, and arriving in the fleet's advance base at Ulithi four days after. On 14 March, she sailed north to join the Fast Carrier Task Force at sea the following day. She operated as part of the defensive screen for the fast aircraft carriers in Task Force 58 for the next three months. On 18 and 19 March, the carriers raided the Japanese home islands of Kyushu and Honshu as part of the preparatory attacks before the upcoming invasion of Okinawa, further to the south. The carriers then moved to target Okinawa directly, beginning a series of raids from 23 March to 1 April. During this period, Springfield contributed to the fleet's antiaircraft defense as heavy Japanese counterattacks repeatedly struck the ships. She also carried out shore bombardment on the nearby island of Minami Daito.

American forces went ashore on Okinawa on 1 April, and the ships of the Fast Carrier Task Force shifted to provide direct support to the men fighting their way across the island in a campaign that lasted for more than a month. During this period, Springfield was primarily used to defend against the heavy Japanese air attacks on Allied forces. These attacks included widespread use of the kamikaze suicide tactics, and Springfield's gunners shot down at least three aircraft attempting to crash into American ships. On 17 April, after shooting down one of these planes, Springfield came under attack by a second kamikaze, whose pilot tried to crash his plane into the ship. Evasive maneuvers allowed the ship to narrowly escape being hit, and the plane crashed into the sea just 50 yd (46 m) away.

Springfield was detached to bombard Minami Daito again on 10 and 11 May. She thereafter resumed her role as part of the fleet's antiaircraft defense for the rest of the month. During this period, on 13 and 14 May, she accompanied the carriers for raids on Japanese airfields on Kyushu, part of an attempt to neutralize the aircraft being used to attack the fleet. Springfield remained on station off Okinawa through 28 May.

==== Japan campaign ====
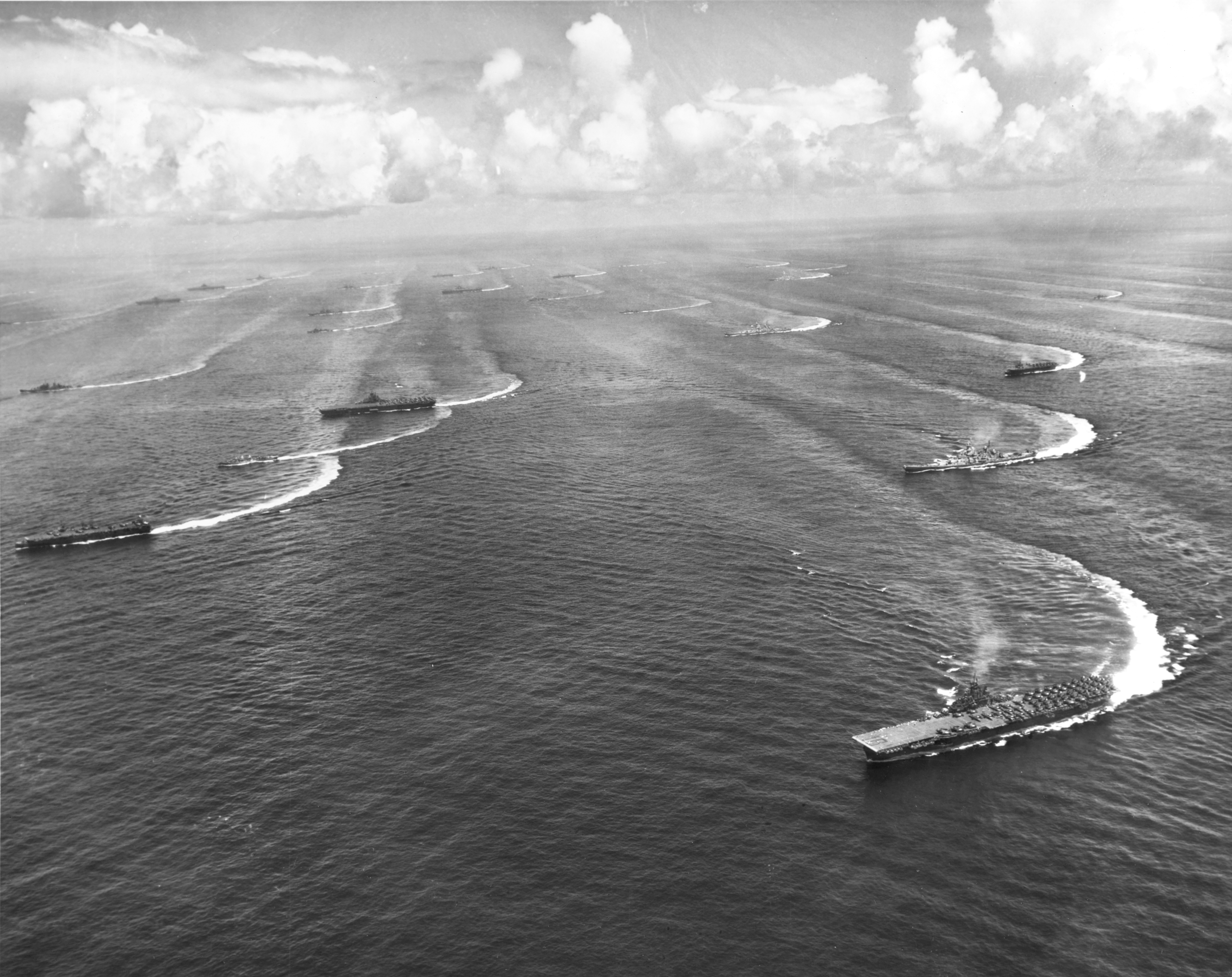
Vessels of the Fast Carrier Task Force off Japan in August 1945

On 27 May, the Fast Carrier Task Force reverted to the 3rd Fleet under Admiral William Halsey, Jr, replacing the 5th Fleet under Admiral Raymond A. Spruance. The fleet units were accordingly re-numbered from 58 to 38. Springfield was detached to Leyte in the Philippines, arriving there three days later for maintenance that lasted for a month. She then departed to re-join the carriers in TF 38, which had begun a series of attacks on the Japanese home islands in anticipation of the invasion of Kyushu. Springfield was present for strikes on Tokyo on 10 and 11 July, followed by attacks in northern Japan on 13 and 14 July, including on Hokkaido. Springfield participated in a patrol for Japanese merchant shipping on the night of 14–15 July, before returning to cover the carriers for another round of strikes on Tokyo and Yokohama. On 18 July, the carrier planes attacked some of the few Japanese warships remaining afloat, including the battleships Nagato and Haruna. Over the last week of July, the carriers struck Kobe and Kure repeatedly, and Springfield was detached to bombard coastal targets in southern Honshu on the night of 24–25 July. On 30 July, the Fast Carrier Task Force returned to strike Tokyo again, followed by another voyage north to attack northern Honshu and Hokkaido again on 9 and 10 August. The final carrier raids of the war were carried out on 13 August.

On 15 August, Japan announced it would surrender, which ended the fighting. For her service during the war, Springfield was awarded two battle stars. On 27 August, Springfield joined Task Force 35 as it entered Sagami Bay, outside of Tokyo. She covered the entrance of Task Force 31 into Tokyo Bay three days later, and after that she was sent to take part in the occupation of the Yokosuka Naval Arsenal. She thereafter returned to Sagami Bay, where she remained until 3 September, when she moved to Tokyo Bay. She remained there for the next few weeks, and on 20 September, the task force reverted to 5th Fleet. Springfield thereafter cruised in East Asian waters in the immediate postwar period as Japanese forces were demilitarized and returned from previously occupied countries. She visited a number of ports, including Sasebo and Yokosuka, Japan; Shanghai, Taku, Qingdao, and Qinhuangdao, China; and Jinsen, Korea. These visits continued into January 1946, and on the 9th, she sailed from Qingdao, bound for San Pedro, California, arriving on 25 January. From there, she moved to the Mare Island Naval Shipyard for periodic maintenance.

=== Postwar career ===
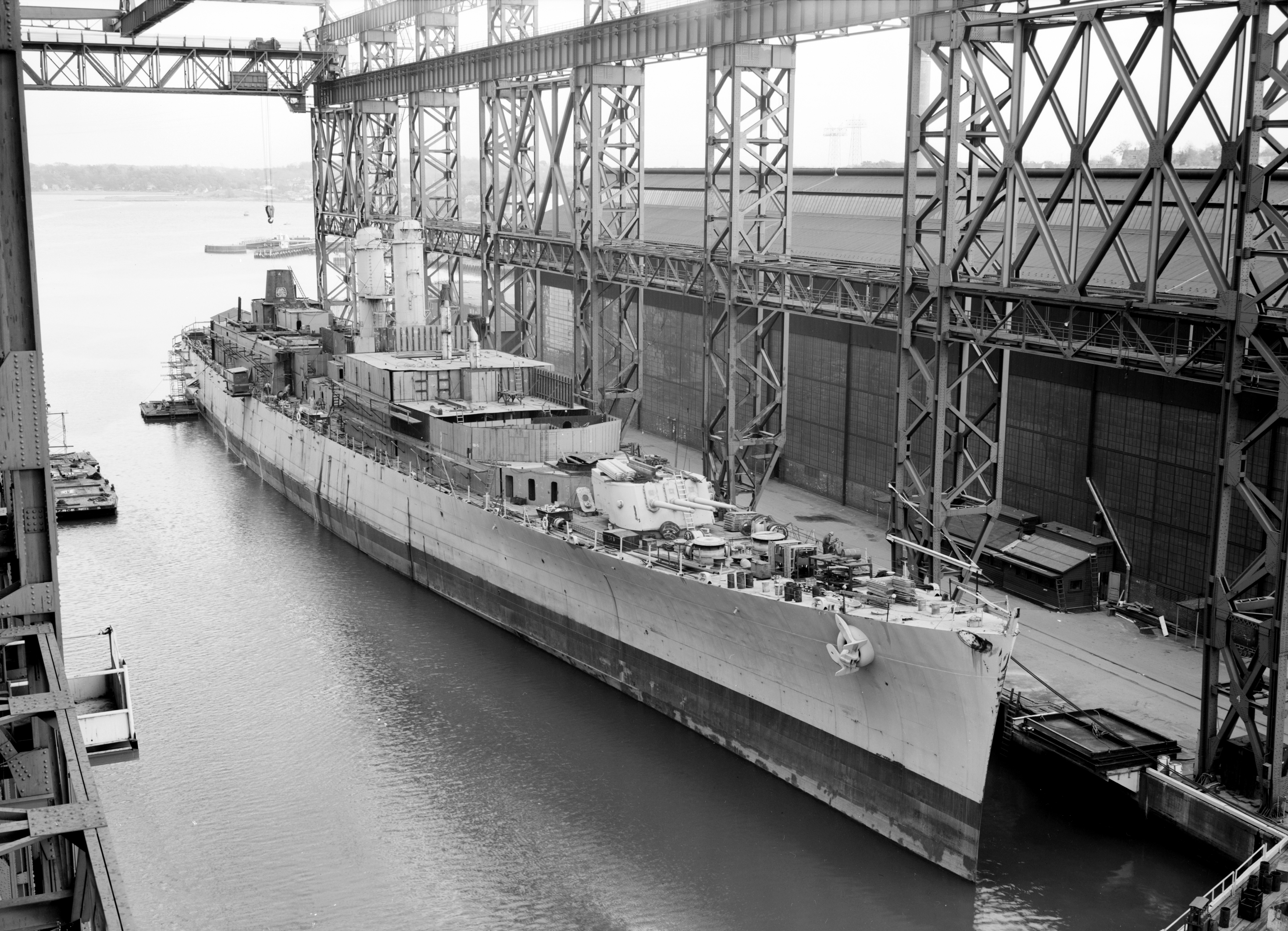
Springfield during conversion in 1958

==== Pacific Fleet and conversion ====
Springfield operated off the West Coast of the United States for much of the rest of 1946. In November, she returned to the central Pacific, stopping in Guam on 15 November. She thereafter cruised in the area, primarily traveling between Guam and Saipan in the Mariana Islands for the next few months. On 19 February 1947, she left the Marianas to return to California, stopping in Kwajalein Atoll from 25 to 27 February and then Pearl Harbor from 11 to 18 March. She ultimately arrived in San Pedro on 24 March. She cruised off the west coast for the next year and a half, participating in routine training exercises. Another deployment to the western Pacific followed in late 1948; she arrived in Yokosuka on 3 November, where she joined the 7th Fleet. She operated with that unit until mid-May, and during that period, she visited a number of ports in the region, including Sasebo, Kure, Hakodate, Otaru, and Okinawa, Japan; Qingdao and Shanghai, China; and British Hong Kong. The ship returned to California on 1 June 1949, and a little over three months later, she was taken into drydock to be prepared for long-term storage in the Pacific Reserve Fleet. She was then formally placed in the reserve fleet in January 1950.

The ship was moored in San Francisco, California, for most of the 1950s. In March 1959, Springfield was towed from San Francisco, through the Panama Canal, to Boston for conversion to a guided-missile cruiser. She arrived at the Fore River Shipyard in Quincy on 15 May, where work began on rebuilding the ship into a Providence-class cruiser. She received extensive modifications that included replacing her aft turrets with a RIM-2 Terrier surface-to-air missile launcher. Work on the ship continued for more than a year before she was ready for operation. Final conversion work was carried out at the Boston Naval Shipyard. She was re-designated with the hull number CLG-7, and was recommissioned on 2 July 1960. Springfield performed sea trials off the coast of New England beginning in July. She then embarked on a shakedown cruise that went as far south as Guantanmo Bay, Cuba, and lasted until November.

==== Atlantic and Mediterranean service ====
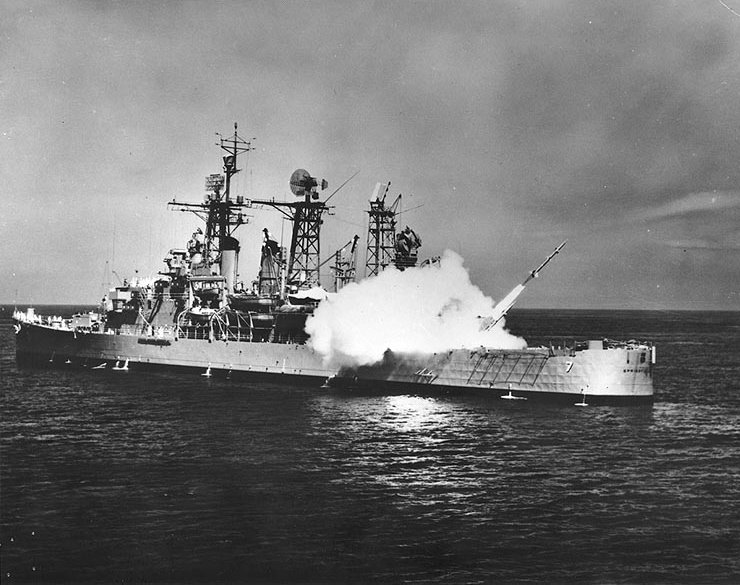
Springfield fires a Terrier missile, 1961

Springfield sailed from Boston on 4 December, bound for the Mediterranean Sea. After arriving ten days later, she became the flagship of the 6th Fleet, replacing the heavy cruiser Des Moines in that role. She served with the 6th Fleet for the next six years, and over this period she was based at Villefranche-sur-Mer, France. She performed a number of functions while the flagship of 6th Fleet. She made goodwill visits to numerous ports in the region, including Dubrovnik and Split, Yugoslavia; Famagusta, Cyprus; and Ajaccio, Corsica. She also participated in frequent training maneuvers held with the entire 6th Fleet and with friendly navies in the region. Because she was the fleet flagship, she also frequently hosted foreign visitors, including King Constantine II of Greece, Princess Grace of Monaco, ambassadors, and senior military and naval officers. During this period, she underwent one major overhaul, which lasted from 11 May to 15 December 1963. Springfield was ordered to return home on 20 January 1967; she was relieved as the fleet flagship by the guided-missile cruiser Little Rock on 28 January. Springfield thereafter returned to Boston, stopping in Portsmouth, Great Britain, on the way.

After reaching Boston on 16 February, Springfield was dry-docked for another overhaul that lasted almost six months. While work was still being completed on 1 August, Springfield was assigned to Norfolk, Virginia. On 6 August, she arrived in Yorktown, Virginia, where she remained for the next month. On 1 September, she became the flagship of the 2nd Fleet, relieving the heavy cruiser Newport News. Shortly thereafter, she sailed for the Atlantic Fleet shooting practice grounds to participate in training exercises for her gun and missile crews. The ship stopped in the Roosevelt Roads Naval Station in Puerto Rico to refuel before embarking on a major cruise to northern European ports. She stopped first in Portsmouth, Great Britain, and thereafter visited Amsterdam, the Netherlands; Lisbon, Portugal; Barcelona, Spain; and Pollensa Bay on the island of Mallorca. Her voyage concluded with her return to Norfolk on 6 December.

Springfield operated off the East Coast of the United States for most of 1968, participating in routine training exercises with the rest of the fleet based at Norfolk. During this period, she also conducted a training cruise for midshipmen from the United States Naval Academy. She sailed on 12 September to northern Europe to participate in the North Atlantic Treaty Organization training operation Silver Tower, which was held in the Norwegian Sea. By 27 September, the exercises had been completed, and Springfield departed for another tour of European ports, including Oslo, Norway; Le Havre, France; Lisbon; Portsmouth; and Rota, Spain, where on 23 October she hosted a meeting between the commanders of 2nd and 6th Fleets. Springfield sailed from Rota on 24 October, bound for Norfolk, arriving there on 1 November. She returned to her previous pattern of training exercises off the east coast until early July. Newport News relieved Springfield as the fleet flagship on 8 July, permitting the latter to be dry-docked for an extensive period of maintenance.

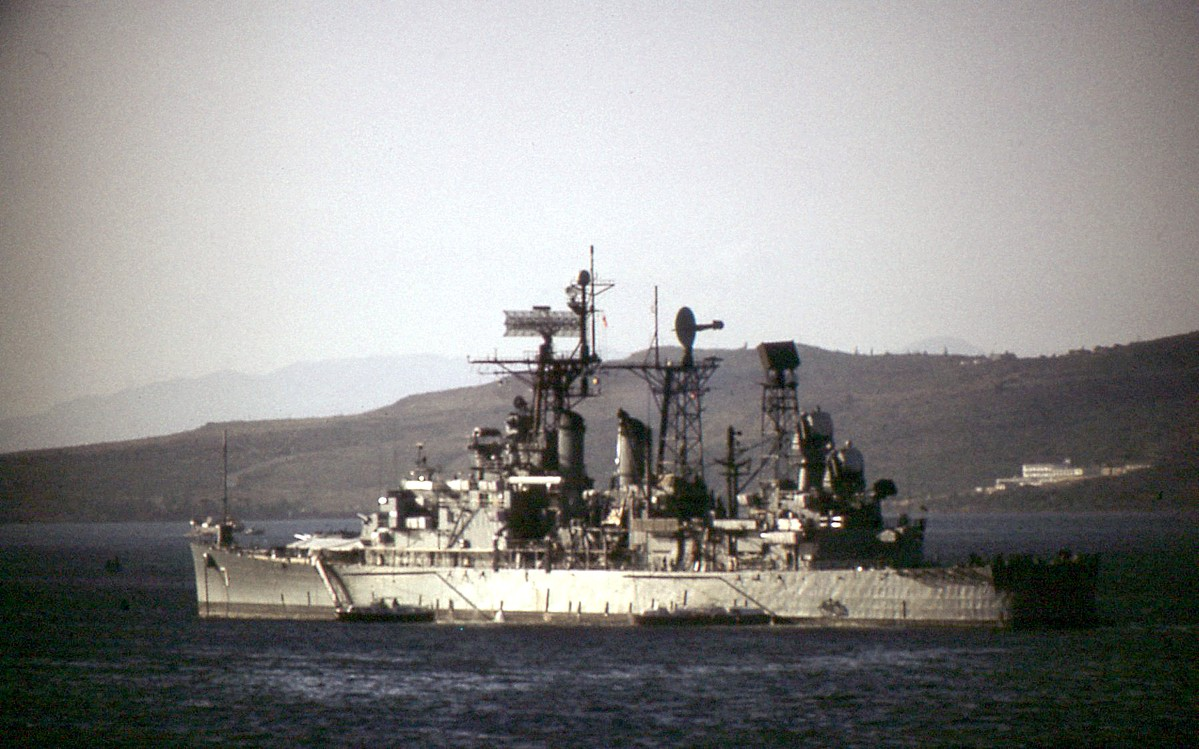
USS Springfield at Souda Bay, Crete, 1972

The ship resumed flagship duties for 2nd Fleet on 14 January 1970, replacing Newport News in that role once again. She served in that capacity for just seven months, however, before Newport News replaced her again so that Springfield could deploy to the Mediterranean on 10 August. There, she replaced Little Rock as the 6th Fleet flagship on 22 August. Springfield cruised in the Mediterranean for the next four years, carrying out a routine similar to her previous tour in the region, visiting ports, hosting foreign dignitaries, and participating in training exercises. President Richard Nixon and the United States Secretary of the Navy attended one meeting aboard the ship during her deployment. While cruising with the 6th Fleet, Springfield left the region just four times, visiting Casablanca, Morocco, and Lisbon twice each. In April 1973, flying the flag of Vice Admiral Gerald E. Miller, Commander, Sixth Fleet, she served as the command ship for flood relief operations in Tunisia, after four days of heavy rain had left 40,000 people homeless. Other ships involved included the aircraft carrier Forrestal, the destroyer Sampson, and the amphibious transport dock Ponce. On 1 September, Little Rock arrived to replace her as the fleet flagship.

Springfield passed through Gibraltar and the Azores on the way home, ultimately arriving in Boston on 14 September. Three days later, she departed for Norfolk to begin the process of inactivation to prepare her for another stint in the reserve fleet. By the end of the year, she had entered the Inactive Ship Facility at Portsmouth, Virginia. She was decommissioned on 15 May 1974, assigned to the Atlantic Reserve Fleet, and moored in Philadelphia. Springfield was stricken from the Naval Vessel Register on 31 July 1978 and was sold to ship breakers for scrap on 1 March 1980.
