= United States Sixth Fleet =

Numbered fleet of the United States Navy

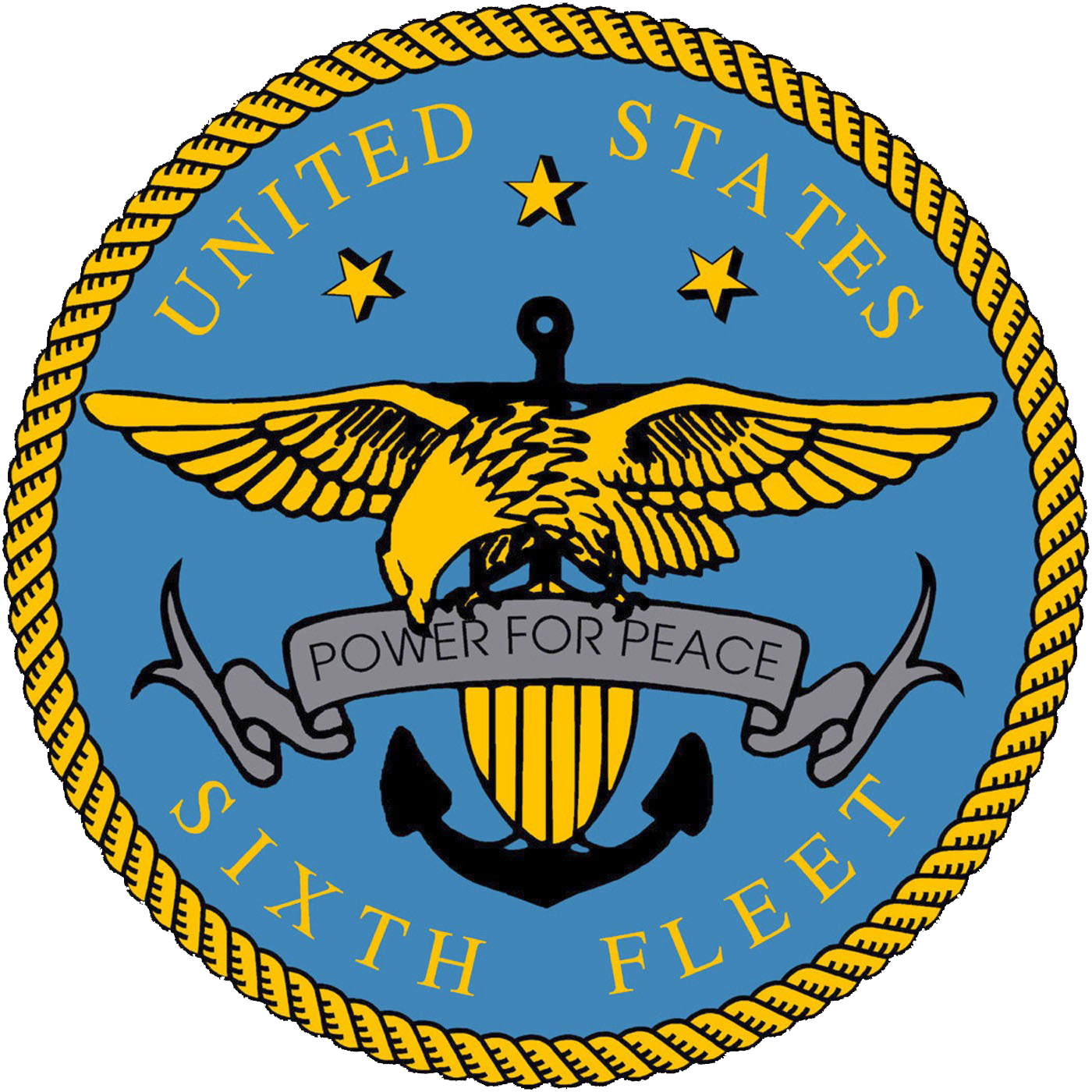
- The U.S. Sixth Fleet's seal
- Founded: 12 February 1950; 76 years ago
- Country: United States
- Branch: United States Navy
- Part of: Commander, U.S. Naval Forces Europe-Naval Forces Africa
- Garrison/HQ: NSA Naples, Italy
- Website: c6f.navy.mil

Commanders
- Current commander: VADM Jeffrey T. Anderson

The Sixth Fleet is a numbered fleet of the United States Navy operating as part of United States Naval Forces Europe and Africa. The Sixth Fleet is headquartered at Naval Support Activity Naples, Italy. The officially stated mission of the Sixth Fleet in 2011 is that it "conducts the full range of Maritime Operations and Theater Security Cooperation missions, in concert with coalition, joint, interagency, and other parties, in order to advance security and stability in Europe and Africa." The current commander of the Sixth Fleet is Vice Admiral Jeffrey T. Anderson.

The Sixth Fleet was established in February 1950 by redesignation of the former Sixth Task Fleet, which in turn was the 1948 redesignation of U S Naval Forces, Mediterranean. Since that time, it has been continually engaged in world affairs around the Mediterranean, and, on occasion, further afield. It was involved in numerous NATO maritime exercises, the U.S. Lebanese intervention of 1958, confrontation with the Soviets during the Yom Kippur War (also known as the October War) of 1973, clearance of the Suez Canal after 1973, several confrontations with Libya during the 1980s (including Operation El Dorado Canyon), and maintenance of task forces in the Adriatic during the wars in former Yugoslavia in the 1990s. Most recently it launched airstrikes on Libya again during the Libyan Civil War of 2011.

== History ==
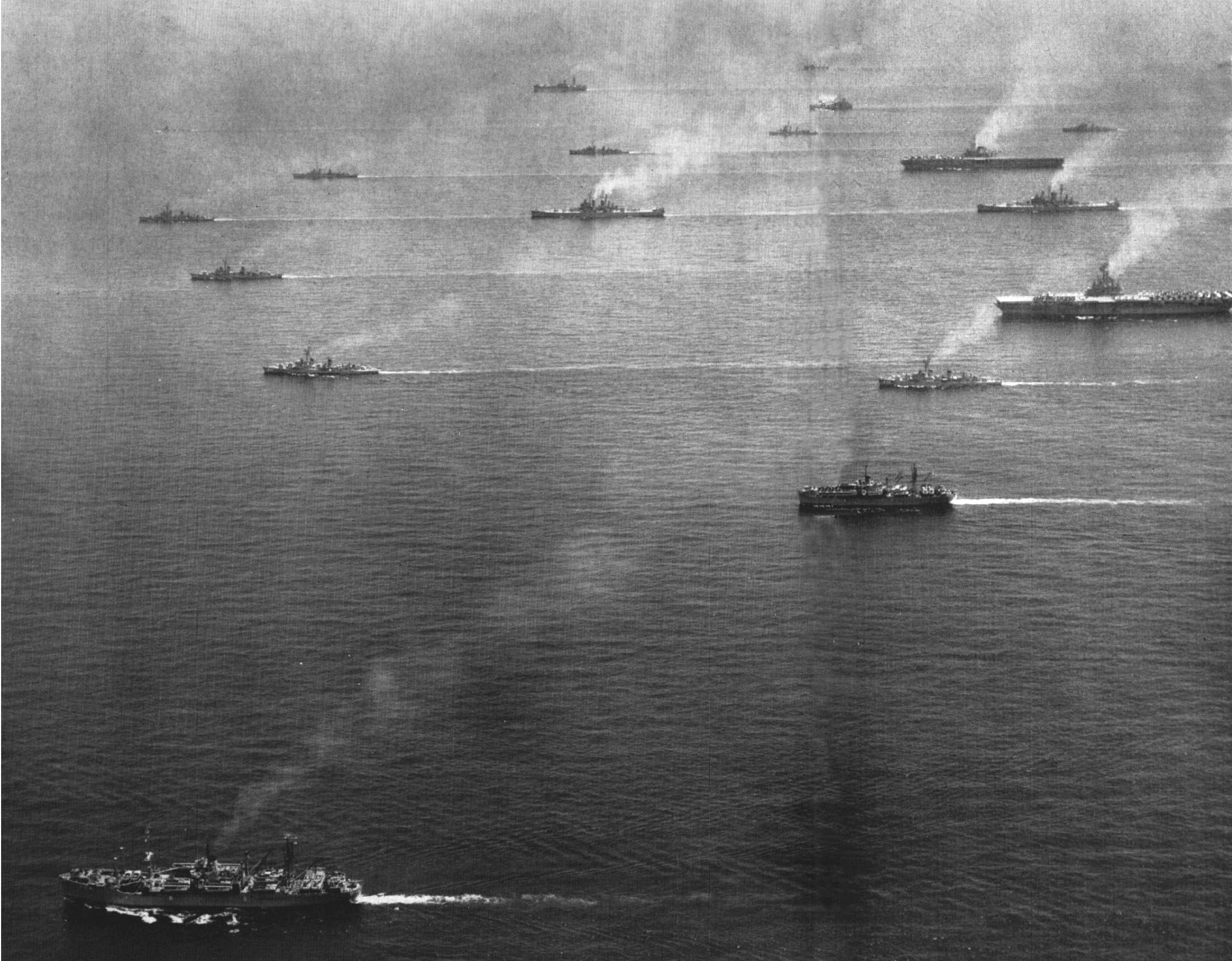
The U.S. Sixth Fleet in 1954

The United States has maintained a naval presence in the Mediterranean since the early 19th century, when U.S. Naval forces first engaged the Barbary pirates to prevent them from interfering with commercial shipping. The earliest unit was the Mediterranean Squadron.

On 1 February 1946, U.S. Naval Forces, Northwest African Waters (NavNAW), was redesignated U.S. Naval Forces, Mediterranean. The force was responsible to U.S. Naval Forces, Eastern Atlantic and Mediterranean in London, and had as its flagship a destroyer tender, anchored at Naples, Italy. In 1946, President Harry S. Truman dispatched the battleship Missouri to the Eastern Mediterranean, ostensibly to return the body of Münir Ertegün, former Turkish Ambassador to Washington, back to Istanbul. However, perhaps a much stronger motive was to demonstrate U.S. power in view of Soviet threats to Turkey and Iran. The cruiser Dayton relieved the tender Shenandoah as flagship and began operating with the fleet. In June 1946 Fargo, flying the flag of Vice Admiral Bernhard Bieri, Commander, Naval Forces Mediterranean, was despatched to Trieste.

On 5 September 1946, USS Franklin D. Roosevelt, flying the flag of Rear Admiral John H. Cassady, Commander Carrier Division 1, and accompanied by USS Little Rock, USS Cone, USS New and USS Corry, visited Piraeus, the port of Athens. USS Randolph, escorted by USS Fargo and USS Perry, visited Greece in December 1946.

The title of Naval Forces Mediterranean was changed to Commander Sixth Task Fleet and then, in 1950, Commander, Sixth Fleet. Sixth Fleet's NATO guise was the principal player in Exercise Longstep during November 1952. In 1957, a naval exercise, Operation Deep Water, took place within the Allied Forces Southern Europe area of responsibility. It was conducted by Naval Striking and Support Forces Southern Europe (STRIKFORSOUTH), commanded by Vice Admiral Charles R. Brown USN, who also commanded the Sixth Fleet. STRIKEFORSOUTH was effectively the NATO designation for the U.S. Sixth Fleet, though additional NATO headquarters personnel would eventually be assigned, while maintaining U.S. control over its nuclear weapons on board U.S. aircraft carriers as mandated by the Atomic Energy Act of 1946.

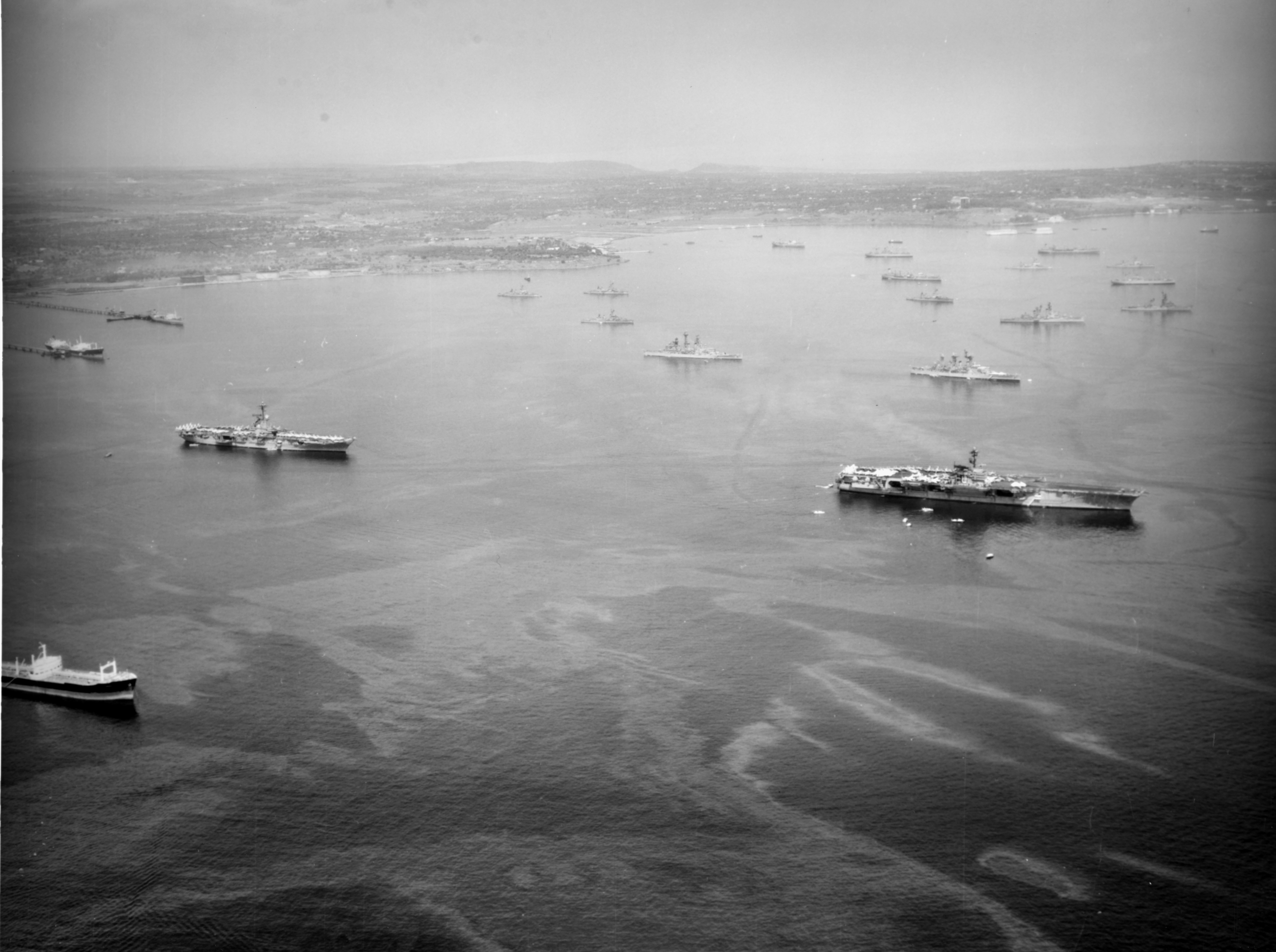
U.S. ships in Sicily, 1965

The Sixth Fleet supported U.S. Army forces during Operation Blue Bat in Lebanon in 1958.

On 20 January 1967, following France's withdrawal from the NATO Military Command Structure, and the removal of U.S. troops from France, Sixth Fleet Headquarters was moved from Villefranche-sur-Mer, France to Gaeta, Italy.

During the Cold War, the Sixth Fleet had several confrontations with the Soviet Navy's 5th Operational Squadron, notably during the 1973 Yom Kippur War. During the Yom Kippur War Elmo Zumwalt describes part of the Sixth Fleet buildup as follows:

On 25 October JCS directed TG 20.1, John F. Kennedy and escorts, to [come under the command of]... ComSixthFleet as TG 60.3 and proceed to join TG 60 south of Crete. Additionally, Franklin D. Roosevelt and escorts (TG 60.2) and TF61/62 [the amphibious task forces] were directed to join TG 60.1 south of Crete. ...TG 100.1 (Baltic destroyers) were ordered to proceed to the Mediterranean and chop to ComSixthFleet...

5 April 1974, the United States and Egypt agreed that the United States would provide extensive assistance to clear the Suez Canal of mines, unexploded ordnance, and sunken ships. These operations took the form of Nimbus Star (mine and ordnance clearance), Nimbus Moon (land and sub-surface naval ordnance clearance), and Nimrod Spar, in which a private salvage contractor would clear the canal of the ten sunken ships under the supervision of the Sixth Fleet's Task Force 65. Captain J. Huntly Boyd, the Navy's Supervisor of Salvage, was sent to the Canal Zone as Commander, Salvage Task Group (CTG 65.7). He supervised the actual salvage clearing operation which was carried out by the Murphy Pacific Marine Salvage Company of New York. A total of ten ships blocked the canal; 200 civilian specialists worked from May to December 1974 to complete the operation. The canal reopened on 5 June 1975, with the Sixth Fleet flagship Little Rock in attendance.

On the afternoon of 8 June 1967, while in international waters off the northern coast of the Sinai Peninsula, the electronic intelligence gathering ship USS Liberty (AGTR-5) was attacked and damaged by the Israel Defence Force; 34 U.S. sailors were killed and 174 wounded by the Israeli attack. Though Liberty was severely damaged, with a 39-by-24-foot (11.9 m × 7.3 m) hole amidships and a twisted keel, her crew kept her afloat, and she was able to leave the area under her own power. After the attack, she was escorted to Valletta, Malta, by units of the Sixth Fleet and was given temporary repairs. After the repairs were completed, Liberty returned to the United States on 27 July 1967. She was decommissioned and stricken from the Naval Vessel Register on 28 June 1968. She was laid up in the Atlantic Reserve Fleet of Norfolk until December 1970, when she was transferred to the Maritime Administration for disposal. In 1973, she was sold for scrapping to the Boston Metals Company of Baltimore, Maryland.

In 1999, changes to CINCUSNAVEUR's area of responsibility were announced, after amendments to the Unified Command Plan. The United States Atlantic Command areas that had included the waters off Europe and the west coast of Africa were to be transferred to European Command. U.S. European Command already had responsibility for all U.S. land and air military planning in Europe and most of Africa. The change gave EUCOM, and NAVEUR, the responsibility for maritime planning in the same general area of operations. The changes were made effective on October 1, 2000. The Atlantic Command areas that presently include the waters off Europe and the west coast of Africa were also transferred to European Command. This change also extended Sixth Fleet's responsibilities to the mid-Atlantic.

The Sixth Fleet provided military, logistical and humanitarian assistance to support NATO operations in Kosovo from the beginning of Operation Allied Force. It also participated in Operation Shining Hope and Operation Joint Guardian. In March 2011, it was involved in operations in Libya pursuant to United Nations Security Council Resolution 1973.

== Structure ==
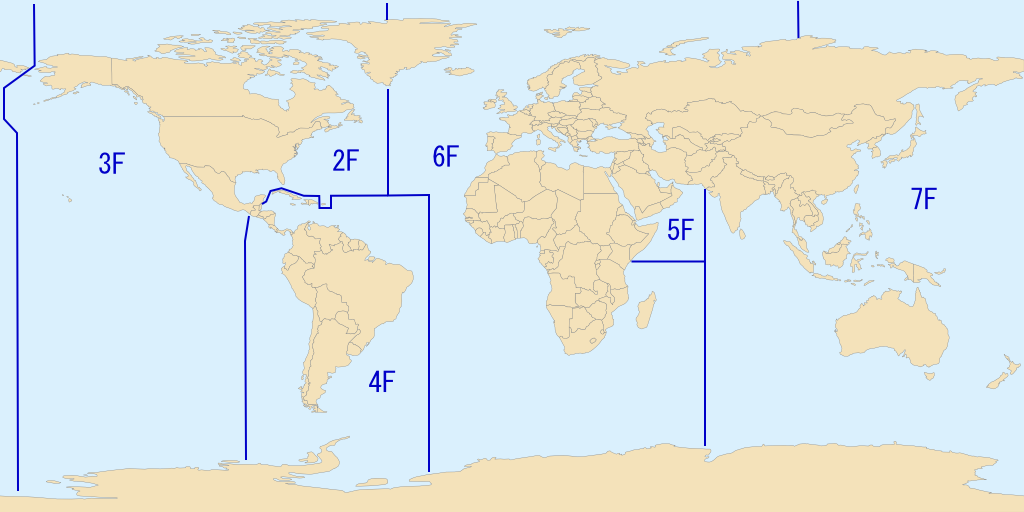
The Sixth Fleet's area of responsibility, 2009

The fleet once had its headquarters in Gaeta, Italy, commanded by a vice admiral. However, beginning in 2004, the Sixth Fleet staff was combined with United States Naval Forces Europe staff, up to that time headquartered in London. Since then the staff has operated as a single entity with a four star admiral who serves as Commander, Naval Forces Europe and Commander, Naval Forces Africa. This admiral has a three star Deputy Commander who also carries the title Commander, U.S. 6th Fleet. The staff as a whole is known as Commander, Naval Forces Europe-Africa/Commander, U.S. 6th Fleet or CNE-CNA/C6F and works from its facilities at Naval Support Activity Naples at the Capodichino site in Naples, Italy. USS Mount Whitney is the Sixth Fleet flagship with its homeport Gaeta, Italy and operating in the Mediterranean.

U.S. Naval forces entering the Mediterranean Sea have their operational control changed to being under Sixth Fleet. This change of command is always referred to as 'CHOPing,' an abbreviation for Change of Operational Control. Sixth Fleet has consisted of up to 40 ships, 175 aircraft and 21,000 people, such as in early 2003, when two carrier battle groups operated in the Mediterranean during Operation Iraqi Freedom.

Since the submarine tender Emory S. Land, based in La Maddalena in Sardinia, changed homeports to Bremerton, Washington, the fleet has just one permanently assigned ship, Mount Whitney. The fleet typically has a number of frigates and destroyers assigned, as well as those vessels transiting between the East Coast and the Suez. Since 2005, Sixth Fleet ships have increasingly been operating around Africa, particularly in the Gulf of Guinea.

The Sixth Fleet is operationally organized into task forces. Naval Striking and Support Forces Southern Europe included Task Force 502 (Carrier Forces, effectively Task Force 60), Task Force 503 (Amphibious Forces), Task Force 504 (Landing Forces), Task Force 505 (Logistics Forces), and Task Force 506 (Special Operations Forces).

=== Destroyer squadron 60 ===
Destroyer Squadron 60 (DESRON SIX ZERO) was established on 19 February 2003. It was homeported in Gaeta, Italy. The establishment of Destroyer Squadron Sixty provided CNE/COMSIXTHFLT with a permanently assigned destroyer squadron, increasing the Sixth Fleet's options when undertaking national and theater level tasking.

From November 2007 to April 2008, COMDESRON 60 (Commander, Destroyer Squadron 60's commander) served as Commander Africa Partnership Station with an international staff operating off West Africa and the Gulf of Guinea.

He also serves as Commander, Task Force 365, Task Force West and Central Africa.

=== Task Force 60 ===
Task Force 60 was for many years the Sixth Fleet's Battle Force. When any carrier strike group enters into the Mediterranean operating area it was usually designated TF 60 and the battle group commander, a one or two-star Rear Admiral, assumes duties as Commander Task Force 60 (CTF 60) from COMDESRON 60. The Task Force is often composed of one or more aircraft carriers, each with an accompanying complement of two to six cruisers and destroyers. On board the aircraft carrier is a Carrier air wing of 65–85 aircraft. This air wing is its primary striking arm, and includes attack, fighter, anti-submarine, and reconnaissance aircraft.

During the 1986 confrontation with Libya, that led to Operation El Dorado Canyon, the Sixth Fleet's battle force was under the command of Rear Admiral David E. Jeremiah. Task Group 60.1 under Rear Admiral J.C. Breast was made up of the Coral Sea and her escorts, Task Group 60.2 under Jeremiah, Saratoga and her escorts, and Task Group 60.3 under Rear Admiral Henry H. Mauz, Jr., USS America (CV-66) and her escorts. Task Group 60.5, the Surface Action Group under Captain Robert L. Goodwin, was made up of a missile cruiser, missile destroyer, and another destroyer.

In November 2007, Task Group 60.4 held the Africa Partnership Station role, embarked aboard the amphibious ship Fort McHenry. HSV Swift was scheduled to join Fort McHenry in Africa in November 2007. In 2012, Task Group 60.5 was permanently assigned as the Southeast Africa Task Group. The Group may be renamed the South and East Africa Task Group. It held the alternate designation of Task Force 363.

As of 2011 Task Force 60 will normally be the commander of Naval Task Force Europe and Africa. Any naval unit within the USEUCOM or USAFRICOM AOR may be assigned to TF 60 as required upon signal from the Commander of the Sixth Fleet.

=== Task Force 61, amphibious assault force ===
Task Force 61 was the Mediterranean Amphibious Ready Group. It is composed of approximately three amphibious ships and their embarked landing craft. From these ships, United States Marine amphibious forces can move ashore by sea and air in amphibious assault or emergency evacuation missions. Once ashore, the ships of Task Force 61 logistically support the ground forces, until the objective of the landing has been accomplished, and the Marine Forces return to the ships.

As of 2011, according to official NavEur/NavAf Public Affairs sources, Task Force 61 will normally be the commander of the deployed carrier strike group (CSG) and will exercise operational control of all units assigned to TF61 operating in the USEUCOM or USAFRICOM AOR.

=== Task Force 62, Landing Force ===
Task Force 62 is the combat-ready ground force composed of a Marine expeditionary unit (MEU) of approximately 1,900 Marines. Transported in Task Force 61 ships, the MEU is equipped with armor, artillery, and transport helicopters that enable it to conduct operations ashore, or evacuate civilians from troubled areas. This MEU is usually from II MEF on the East Coast.

As of 2011, according to official Public Affairs sources, Task Force 62 will normally be the commander of the deployed Amphibious Ready Group (ARG) and will exercise operational control of all units assigned to TF61 operating in the USEUCOM or USAFRICOM AOR.

=== Task Force 63 logistics force ===
Task Force 63 is the Logistics Force. Task Force 63 and Military Sealift Command's Sealift Logistics Command (SEALOGEUR) are two separately named formations that actually operate as a unified one with one staff. Task Force 63 is headquartered at Naples, Italy. Composed of oilers, provision ships, and repair ships, its mission is the delivery of supplies at sea, and effecting repairs to other ships and equipment of the Fleet. Commander, Task Force 63 (CTF-63) is the operational commander of all the U.S. 6th Fleet air and sea logistics. While in theater, Military Sealift Command's Naval Fleet Auxiliary Force and Special Mission ships report to CTF-63 along with cargo planes that support 6th Fleet and U.S. European Command logistics missions.

CTF-63 is also responsible for ordering and tracking spare parts and supplies being delivered to ships in theater. CTF-63 is the immediate operational commander of Maritime Prepositioning ship Squadron One (MPSRON ONE) based in the Mediterranean Sea. The ships of MPSRON One are deployed year-round. This pre-positions U.S. military cargo at sea. Should a military or humanitarian crisis arise in theater, the squadron can deliver its cargo ashore, enabling a faster U.S. response.

=== Task Force 64 Integrated Air and Missile Defense Force ===
The first incarnation of Task Force 64 consisted of nuclear-powered submarines armed with long-range strategic missiles (SSBN). Until the end of the 1970s these ships were homeported in Naval Station Rota, Spain. The mission was nuclear deterrence. It is extremely unlikely that any SSBNs are actually still assigned or operate with CNE/C6F in the Mediterranean.

Previously, CTF 64 was responsible for ballistic missile submarines assigned to the Sixth Fleet. CTF 64's administrative title, was Commander Submarine Group 8. ComSubGru 8's operational functions were accomplished through four Task Forces: CTF 64, CTF 69 (attack submarines), NATO's CTF 442, or deployed SSBNs and CTF 439, the operational title for Commander Submarines Allied Naval Forces South—the rear admiral's NATO hat. (globalsecurity.org)

TF 64 then became a Special Operation force, previously headquartered by the now-disbanded Naval Special Warfare Unit 10 at Rota, Spain. NSWU 10 disbanded in 2005, and it is now unclear whether CTF 64 is operating currently. During the initial stages of Operation Enduring Freedom in Afghanistan, Task Force 64 became the administrative command structure created to interface with all non-UK/US special forces and smaller ground combat forces provided by various national governments and under U.S. operational control. This may have been because NSWU 10 elements deployed to Afghanistan to form part of the HQ.

On 24 March 2016 TF64 assumed control of 6th Fleet's missile defense mission.

=== Task Force 65 ===
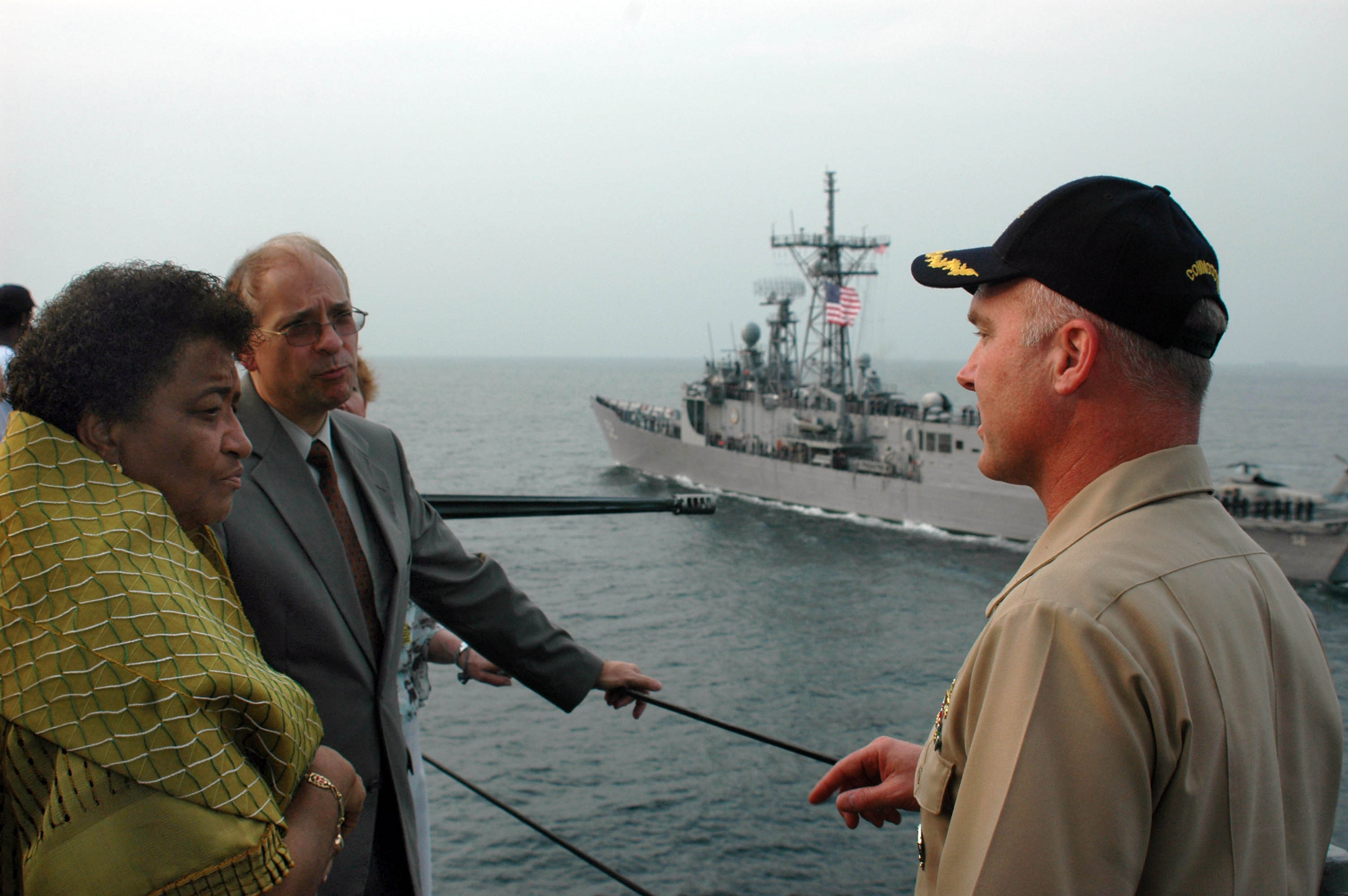
Then newly elected president of Liberia, Ellen Johnson Sirleaf, tours the U.S. Navy's Sixth Fleet command and control ship USS Mount Whitney escorted by Commander, Task Force 65, Captain Tom Rowden, right, while the frigate USS Carr moves alongside the ship. Making her first ever visit aboard a navy vessel, President Johnson-Sirleaf visited Mount Whitney the day after her inauguration to thank the crew for making the journey in support of her country's inaugural ceremonies.

April 1967 saw the threat of civil war in Greece commencing with the military coup that ended parliamentary rule there. Although King Constantine II of Greece held his throne, the possibility of violence in the streets of Athens loomed as a potential threat to U.S. citizens there. It seemed that evacuation by ship might be necessary and the Sixth Fleet commander ordered the formation of a special operations task force. Under the command of Rear Admiral Dick H. Guinn, Task Force 65, with USS America (CV-66) as flagship, sailed eastward to stand by for evacuation, should that step be necessary. Violence never materialized in Greece, and the task force was not called upon to act. On 29 April, Rear Admiral Lawrence R. Geis relieved Rear Admiral Guinn as Commander, Carrier Division 4, Commander, TF 60, Commander, TF 65, and Commander, TF 502 (NATO). With a new admiral on board, and the Greek political crisis behind her, USS America sailed into Taranto Harbor, Italy, on the first day of May for eight days of relaxation. During three days of general visiting in Taranto, America hosted 1,675 visitors who came aboard to tour the hangar and flight decks. America departed Taranto on 8 May for routine task group operations in the Ionian and Tyrrhenian Seas, she followed these with a port visit to Livorno.

Rear Admiral Brian McCauley served as Commander Task Force 65 during the Suez Canal clearance operations, from April 1974 to June 1975.

Task Force 65/Destroyer Squadron 60 is located in Rota, Spain and exercises operational and tactical control of all forward deployed surface combatants operating in the USEUCOM and USAFRICOM AORs under the direction of Naval Forces Europe/Africa. TF 65 surface combatants execute myriad operations from as far north as the Norwegian Sea and south to the Cape of Good Hope including Ballistic Missile Defense, Sea Lines of Communication enforcement, Maritime Interdiction Operations, direct support to NATO combined and Joint operations and exercises, Counter-terrorism operations, Counter-piracy operations, Africa Maritime Law Enforcement Partnership operations, whole of government Africa Partnership Station deployments and Theater Security Cooperation activities both in port and underway.

It can be seen from this 2011 official description that the CDS 60 task force designator has been switched from TF 60 to TF 65.

In November 2007, the destroyer Forrest Sherman circumnavigated the African continent while performing theater security operations with local military forces as the flagship of Task Group 60.5, the U.S. Navy's Southeast Africa task force.

=== Task Force 66 innovation, development ===
During the 1980s, Task Force 66 was the fleet's Area Anti-Submarine Warfare Force.

Re-established in 2024, Task Force 66 headquartered in Naples, Italy, leverages collaboration between the government, industry and academia. Its aim is to accelerate development and fielding of new systems on a large scale.

- Uninhabited systems – integrate all-domain uncrewed systems (UxS) across the joint force, U.S. allies, and partner nations.
- Maritime Domain Awareness – support multinational efforts to address transnational issues like illegal, unreported, and unregulated (IUUx) activities.
- All-Domain – drive operations to integrate capabilities across information, space, cyber, sea, air, and land domains enabled by UxS.

The Task Force works closely with the Navy Disruptive Capabilities Office (DCO) on rapid experimentation and prototyping. It will also work with Naval Postgraduate School's Naval Innovation Center (NIC) established by SECNAV on ways to accelerate technology solutions and applications. To this end, Task Force 66 is responsible for the logistical lines of effort of 6th Fleet's autonomous unmanned systems throughout the AOR with joint force, Coalition, Allies, and partner nations in support of these activities.

=== Task Force 67 land-based maritime patrol aircraft ===
Task Force 67 is composed of land-based maritime patrol aircraft. These aircraft operate over the waters of the Mediterranean in anti-submarine, reconnaissance, surveillance, and mining roles. In the past, Task Force 67's has been provided by Commander, Fleet Air Mediterranean (COMFLTAIRMED), but it is unclear whether FLTAIRMED still exists. The Task Force commander also previously held the role of NATO AFSOUTH's Commander, Maritime Air, Allied Naval Forces South with the NATO task force designator TF 431.

Task Force organization 2022:

CTF-67 commands all Maritime Patrol and Reconnaissance Aircraft (MPRA) in the European and African theaters.

- TG-67.1 Naval Air Station Sigonella, Sicily, VP-Patrol Squadron (P-8A)
- TG-67.2 Naval Air Station Sigonella, Sicily, Tactical Operation Center (TOC)
  - TU-67.2.1 Naval Air Station Sigonella, Sicily, Mobile Tactical Operation Center (MTOC)
  - TU-67.2.2 Naval Air Station Keflavik, Iceland, Mobile Tactical Operation Center (MTOC)
- TG-67.3 Naval Air Station Sigonella, Sicily, Triton UAV (MQ-4)
- TG-67.5 Spangdahlem Air Base, Germany, VAQ-Squadron (EA-18G)
- TG-67.6 Naval Air Station Sigonella, Italy, HSC-Helicopter Sea Combat Squadron (MH-60S)
- TG-67.7 Naval Station Rota, Spain, HSM-Helicopter Maritime Strike Squadron (MH-60R)
- TG-67.8 Naval Air Station Keflavik, Iceland, VP-Patrol Squadron (P-8A)

As of 2011, officially Task Force 67's mission is to provide responsive, interoperable, and expeditionary combat ready maritime patrol aircraft and supporting forces to Commander, U.S. Naval Forces, Europe/Commander, U.S. Naval Forces, Africa and Commander, U.S. Sixth Fleet (CNE-CNA-C6F), NATO and Unified Commanders to conduct effective Anti-Submarine Warfare (ASW), maintain Maritime Domain Awareness (MDA), enhance regional stability, promote cooperative maritime safety and security, and be decisive while conducting overseas contingency operations.

At some point between 1999 and 2012, probably after 11 September 2001, TG-67.6 was activated in Djibouti. This is within the United States Africa Command (AFRICOM) area of operations; before the changeover of responsibility for the Horn of Africa from United States Central Command to AFRICOM, this task group was a component of the United States Fifth Fleet's Task Force 57.

=== Task Force 68, maritime force protection force ===
Established 17 March 2005, CTF 68 is to command force protection forces such as construction battalions, mobile mine assembly units, and Fleet Anti-Terrorism Security Teams (FAST) platoons which are part of Marine Corps Security Force Company Europe (MCSFCoEUR).

Task Force 68 is the Navy Expeditionary Combat Force. Units typically assigned to TF 68 are Explosive Ordnance Disposal units, Naval Construction units and Marines which make up the Fleet Anti-Terrorism Security Teams (FAST).

A possibly more recent mission for CTF 68 is Commander, Task Force SIX EIGHT conducts Explosive Ordnance Disposal operations, Naval Construction, Expeditionary Security and Theater Security Cooperation in order to maintain strategic assess, develop interoperability with coalition, joint, inter-agency and other partners, and increase security and stability in Europe and Africa. On order, conduct Point and Area Defense to protect and defend critical infrastructure and High Value Assets against terrorist attack. Be prepared to conduct Non-Combatant Evacuation Operations.

=== Task Force 69 submarine warfare ===
Task Force 69 is responsible for planning and coordinating area submarine and anti-submarine warfare operations in the Mediterranean. Specifically, Task Force 69 is composed of attack submarines that provide capability to destroy enemy surface ships and submarines, as well as protect other Sixth Fleet ships from attack.

As of 2011, according to official U.S. Navy public affairs contributions to Wikipedia, Task Force 69 is the Submarine Force and exercises operational control of all Submarine assets in the USEUCOM or USAFRICOM AOR.

== Past command ships ==
- USS Newport News
- USS Salem
- USS Des Moines
- USS Columbus
- USS Northampton
- USS Springfield
- USS Little Rock
- USS Boston
- USS Albany
- USS Puget Sound
- USS Coronado
- USS Belknap
- USS La Salle
- USS Mount Whitney (Current)

== Sixth Fleet commanders ==
1. 1945 – July 1946 VADM Jules James (then designated U S Naval Forces, Mediterranean)
1. June 1946 – July 1948 VADM Bernhard H. Bieri (redesignated in 1948 U S Sixth Task Force)
2. July 1948 – November 1949 VADM Forrest Sherman
3. November 1949 – March 1951 VADM John J. Ballentine (redesignated in 1950 U S Sixth Fleet)
4. March 1951 – May 1952 VADM Matthias B. Gardner
5. May 1952 – March 1954 VADM John H. Cassady
6. June 1954 – March 1955 VADM Thomas S. Combs
7. March 1955 – April 1956 VADM Ralph A. Ofstie
8. April 1956 – August 1956 VADM Harry D. Felt
9. August 1956 – September 1958 VADM Charles R. Brown
10. Sept 1958 – September 1959 VADM Clarence Ekstrom
11. September 1959 – July 1961 VADM George Anderson
12. July 1961 – March 1963 VADM David L. McDonald
13. March 1963 – June 1964 VADM William Gentner
14. June 1964 – September 1966 VADM William E. Ellis
15. September 1966 – April 1967 VADM Frederick Ashworth
16. April 1967 – August 1968 VADM William Martin
17. August 1968 – August 1970 VADM David C. Richardson
18. August 1970 – October 1971 VADM Isaac C. Kidd Jr.
19. October 1971– June 1973 VADM Gerald E. Miller
20. June 1973 – September 1974 VADM Daniel J. Murphy
21. September 1974 – August 1976 VADM Frederick C. Turner
22. August 1976 – September 1978 VADM Harry D. Train II
23. September 1978 – July 1979 VADM James D. Watkins
24. July 1979 – June 1981 VADM William N. Small
25. June 1981 – July 1983 VADM William H. Rowden
26. July 1983 – February 1985 VADM Edward H. Martin
27. February 1985 – June 1986 VADM Frank Kelso II
28. June 1986 – August 1988 VADM Kendall Moranville
29. August 1988 – November 1990 VADM J. D. Williams
30. November 1990– July 1992 VADM William Owens
31. July 1992 – December 1993 VADM Thomas J. Lopez
32. December 1993 – April 1995 VADM Joseph Prueher
33. April 1995 – July 1996 VADM Donald L. Pilling
34. July 1996 – July 1998 VADM Charles S. Abbot
35. July 1998 – October 2000 VADM Daniel Murphy Jr
36. October 2000 – October 2001 VADM Gregory G. Johnson
37. October 2001 – November 2003 VADM Scott Fry
38. November 2003– May 2005 VADM H. G. Ulrich III
39. May 2005 – September 2007 VADM J. "Boomer" Stufflebeem
40. September 2007 – August 2008 VADM James A. Winnefeld, Jr.
41. August 2008 – November 2009 VADM Bruce W. Clingan
42. November 2009 – October 2011 VADM Harry B. Harris Jr.
43. October 2011 – October 2013 VADM Frank Craig Pandolfe
44. October 2013 – December 2014 VADM Philip S. Davidson
45. December 2014 – October 2016 VADM James G. Foggo III
46. October 2016 – March 2018 VADM Christopher W. Grady
47. March 2018 – July 2020 VADM Lisa M. Franchetti
48. July 2020 – September 2022 VADM Eugene H. Black III
49. September 2022 – September 2024 VADM Thomas E. Ishee
50. September 2024 – present VADM Jeffrey T. Anderson

== See also ==
- Gilla Gerzon – served as director of the Haifa, Israel USO
