= Thomas Ishee =

U.S. Navy admiral

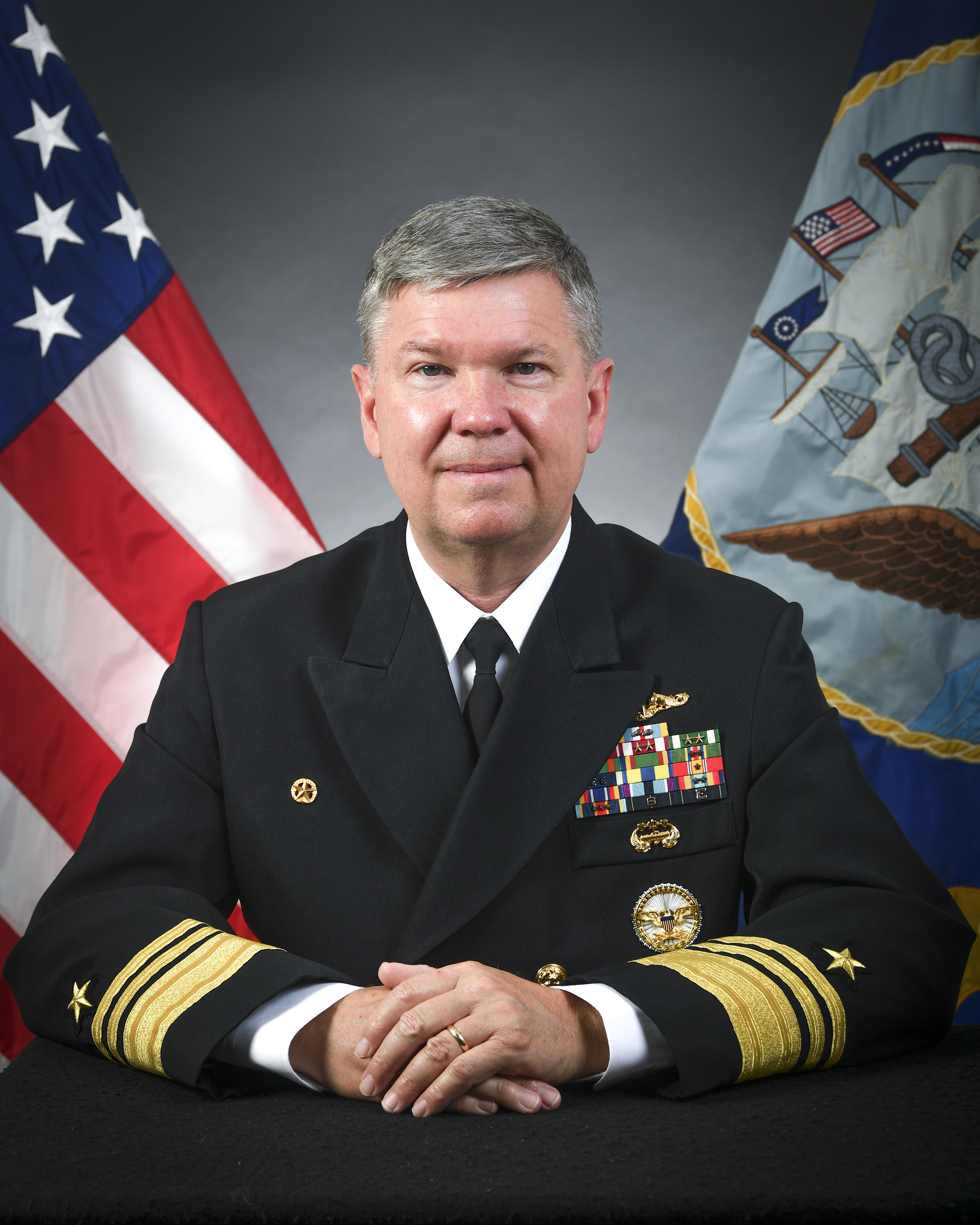
- Official portrait, 2022
- Born: 1965 (age 60–61); Danielsville, Georgia, U.S.
- Military career
- Allegiance: United States
- Branch: United States Navy
- Service years: 1988–2024
- Rank: Vice Admiral
- Commands: United States Sixth Fleet; Naval Striking and Support Forces NATO; Submarine Group 8; Submarine Squadron 11; USS Key West (SSN-722)

Thomas Edward Ishee (born 1965) is a retired United States Navy vice admiral who served as the commander of the United States Sixth Fleet and Naval Striking and Support Forces NATO. He previously served as the director of operations of the United States Strategic Command from August 3, 2020 to July 2022.

== Military career ==
In May 2022, Ishee was nominated for promotion to vice admiral and assignment as commander of the United States Sixth Fleet.

Military offices
Preceded by Daryl Caudle	Deputy Commander of Joint Functional Component Command for Global Strike; 2015–2017	Command inactivated
Preceded by Daryl Caudle	Director of Plans and Operations of the United States Naval Forces Europe-Africa, Deputy Commander of the United States Sixth Fleet, and Commander of Submarine Group Eight; 2017–2019	Succeeded by William J. Houston
Preceded by John W. Tammen	Director of Undersea Warfare Division of the United States Navy; 2019–2020	Succeeded by William J. Houston
Preceded by Stephen L. Davis	Director of Operations of the United States Strategic Command; 2020–2022	Succeeded by John J. Nichols
Preceded by Eugene H. Black III	Commander of the United States Sixth Fleet and Naval Striking and Support Forces NATO; 2022–2024	Succeeded by Jeffrey T. Anderson
