= Jeffrey T. Anderson =

U.S. Navy admiral

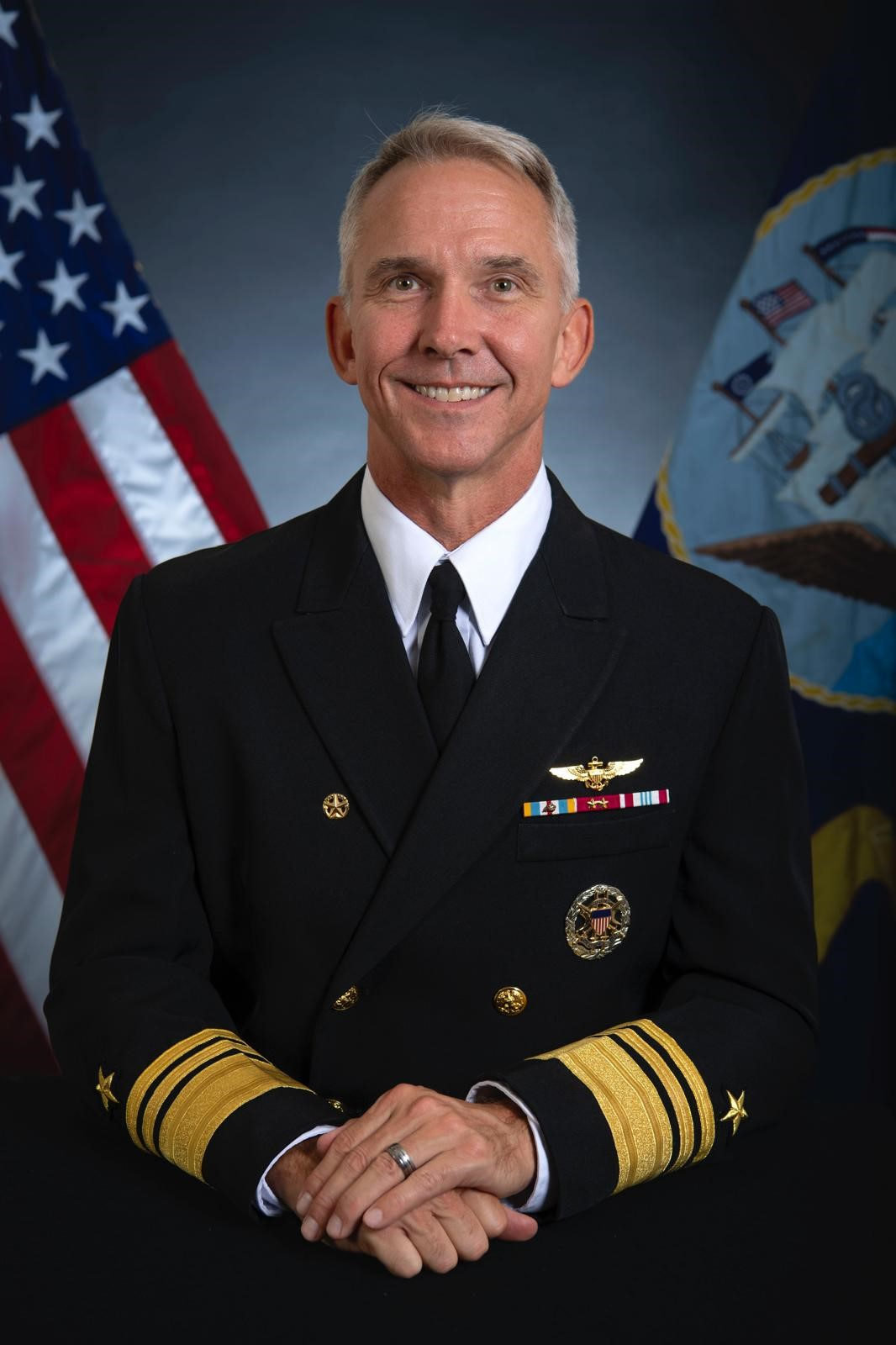
- Official portrait, 2024
- Born: c. 1965 (age 60–61); Fayetteville, Georgia, U.S.
- Military career
- Allegiance: United States
- Branch: United States Navy
- Service years: 1991–present
- Rank: Vice Admiral
- Commands: United States Sixth Fleet; Naval Striking and Support Forces NATO; Carrier Strike Group 3 Carrier Air Wing Three; VFA-37
- Awards: Defense Superior Service Medal (2); Legion of Merit (3)

Jeffrey Thomas Anderson (born c. 1965) is a United States Navy vice admiral who serves as the commander of the United States Sixth Fleet and Naval Striking and Support Forces NATO. He previously served as the director of operations of United States Indo-Pacific Command and commander of Carrier Strike Group 3.

Anderson attended the United States Naval Academy, graduating in 1991 with a B.S. degree in aerospace engineering. After completing flight training, he was designated a naval aviator in 1994. Anderson later completed an M.A. degree in national security and strategic studies at the Naval War College.

In May 2024, Anderson was nominated for promotion to vice admiral and assignment as commander of the United States Sixth Fleet, Task Force Six, and Naval Striking and Support Forces NATO; deputy commander of United States Naval Forces Europe and Africa; and Joint Force Maritime Component Commander Europe.

Military offices
Preceded by ???	Deputy Director for Political-Military Affairs (Asia) of the Joint Staff; 2019–2021	Succeeded by Patrick J. Hannifin
Preceded by James A. Aiken	Commander of the Carrier Strike Group 3; 2021–2022	Succeeded by Kevin P. Lenox
Preceded by John F.G. Wade	Director of Operations of the United States Indo-Pacific Command; 2022–2024	Succeeded by Patrick J. Hannifin
Preceded by Thomas Ishee	Commander of the United States Sixth Fleet and Naval Striking and Support Forces NATO; 2024–present	Incumbent
