= William H. Rowden =

American Navy admiral (1930–2022)

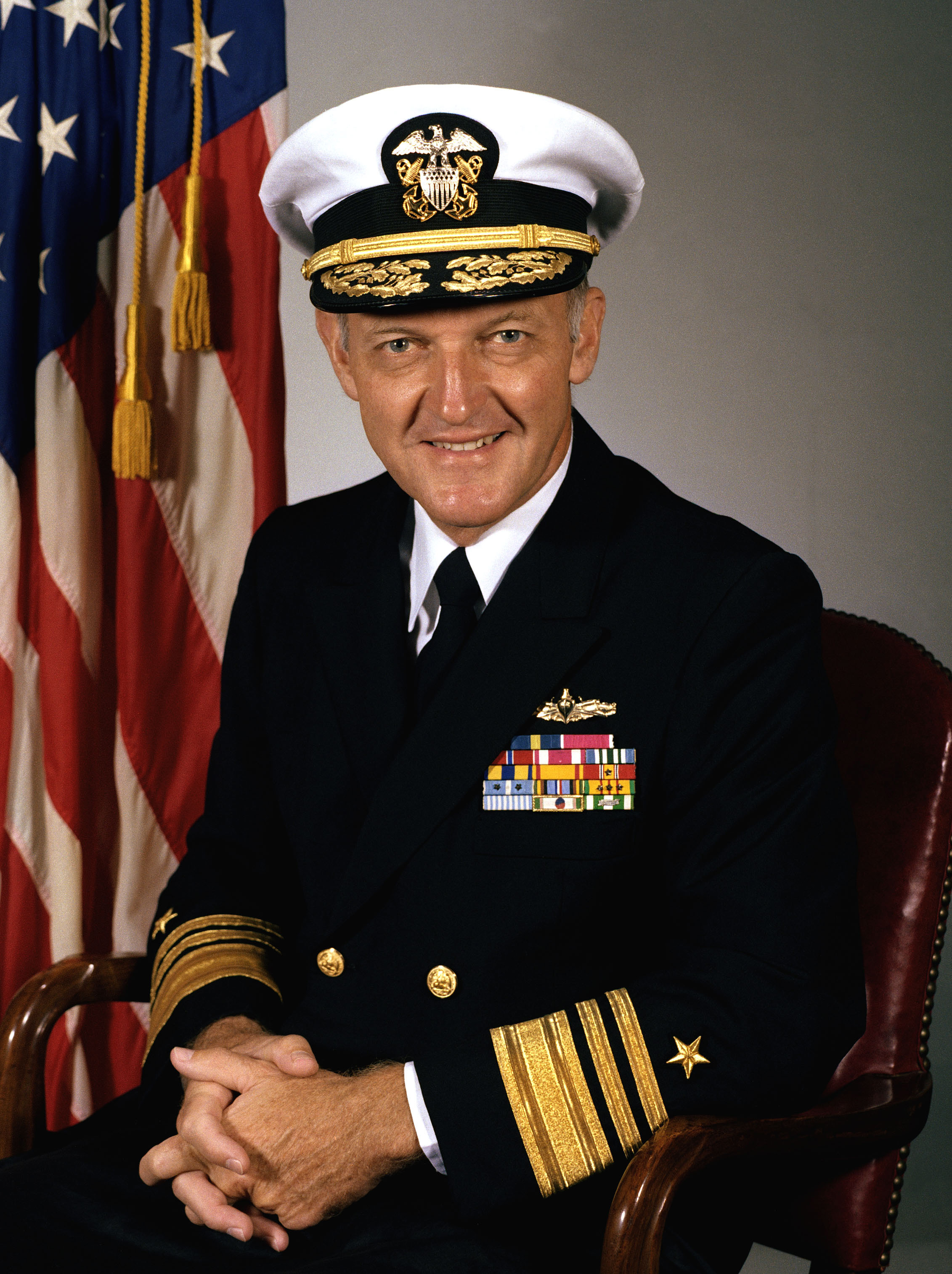
- Rowden in 1983
- Born: May 12, 1930; Woodsville, New Hampshire, U.S.
- Died: October 15, 2022 (aged 92); Willow Street, Pennsylvania, U.S.
- Burial place: Arlington National Cemetery
- Military career
- Allegiance: United States
- Branch: United States Navy
- Rank: Vice Admiral
- Commands: Naval Sea Systems Command; United States Sixth Fleet; USS Lynde McCormick; USS Bauer; USS Cormorant

William Henry Rowden (May 12, 1930 – October 15, 2022) was a vice admiral in the United States Navy. He was a former commander of the United States Sixth Fleet (from June 1981 – July 1983). He also served as Deputy Chief of Naval Operations (Surface Warfare) and Commander, Naval Sea Systems Command. He was a 1952 graduate of the United States Naval Academy. In retirement, he served as a director of the Naval Historical Foundation.
