= Edward H. Martin =

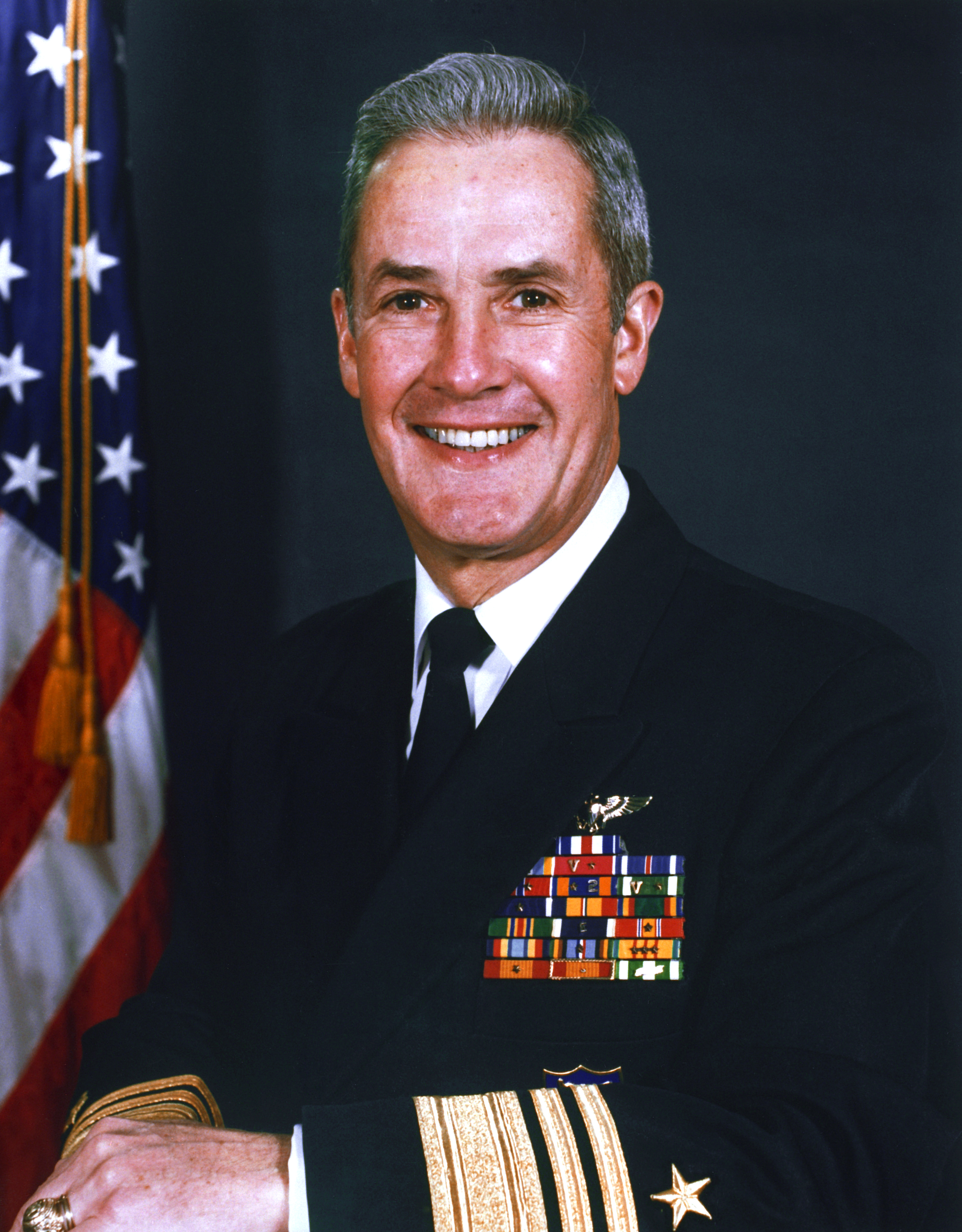
- Born: September 30, 1931; Savannah, Georgia, U.S.
- Died: December 23, 2014 (aged 83); San Diego, California, U.S.
- Burial place: Fort Rosecrans National Cemetery
- Military career
- Allegiance: United States
- Branch: United States Navy
- Service years: 1954–1989
- Rank: Vice admiral

Edward Holmes Martin (September 30, 1931 – December 23, 2014) was a vice admiral in the United States Navy. Martin attended the United States Naval Academy, graduating in the class of 1954. He was also an alumnus of George Washington University, the Naval War College, and the National War College. During the Vietnam War, Martin was shot down during a mission and was kept as a prisoner of war in Hanoi for close to six years.

Martin was a former Chief of Naval Air Training and Commander of Carrier Group FOUR, Carrier Group TWO, Task Force SIXTY, and of the United States Sixth Fleet. He also served as Deputy Chief of Naval Operations for Air Warfare. After his stint as Deputy CNO, he was appointed as United States Commander, Eastern Atlantic and the Deputy Commander-in-Chief, U.S. Naval Forces Europe. He retired in 1989. In retirement he worked in Europe for Xerox Corporation, and in California as a private investor. He was married with three children.

== Background ==
Martin was born in Savannah, Georgia, on September 30, 1931. He attended public school and Armstrong College as well as the University of Georgia Off-Campus Division. In 1950 he entered the U.S. Naval Academy from where he graduated in 1954. Following his graduation from Annapolis, Martin entered flight training in Pensacola, Florida, and later in Kingsville, Texas. From the fall of 1955 until 1959 he served in various carrier based squadrons operating out of San Diego, California. From 1959 until 1962, Martin was an instructor in the light jet Attack Replacement Squadron. In July 1964 he attended the U.S. Naval War College in Newport, Rhode Island. He also holds a master's degree in International Affairs. In July 1965, he reported to Attack Squadron Thirty-Four in Jacksonville, Florida, where he served as operations officer and executive officer.

== Prisoner of war ==
On July 9, 1967, Martin was leading a flight of A4 Skyhawks from the carrier Intrepid, when he encountered numerous surface-to-air missiles near southeast Hanoi. His aircraft was hit and burst into flames. After ejecting safely from the plane, Martin was captured upon landing. During his captivity, both of Martin's shoulders were broken during rope torture and he was confined in both leg and wrist irons. He spent a lot of time in solitary confinement and was subjected to beatings. For the next five years and eight months Martin was held captive in the Hanoi area, until his release on March 4, 1973. Martin died at the age of 83 on December 23, 2014, at a hospital in San Diego, California, of a head injury sustained in a fall at his home.

== Decorations and medals ==

Naval Aviator Badge
1st Row	Navy Distinguished Service Medal with one gold award star	Silver Star	Defense Superior Service Medal
2nd Row	Legion of Merit with Combat V and award star	Distinguished Flying Cross	Bronze Star with Combat V and award star
3rd row	Air Medal with award star and bronze strike/flight numeral 2	Navy and Marine Corps Commendation Medal with Combat V and award star	Purple Heart with award star
4th Row	Combat Action Ribbon	Navy Unit Commendation	Navy Meritorious Unit Commendation
5th Row	Navy E Ribbon	National Defense Service Medal with one bronze service star	Armed Forces Expeditionary Medal with service star
6th Row	Vietnam Service Medal with three service stars	Navy Sea Service Deployment Ribbon	Vietnam Gallantry Cross with gold star
7th row	Vietnam Gallantry Cross Unit Citation	National Order of Merit (France), class unknown (France's fourth highest decoration)	Vietnam Campaign Medal
