= Eugene H. Black III =

US Navy vice admiral

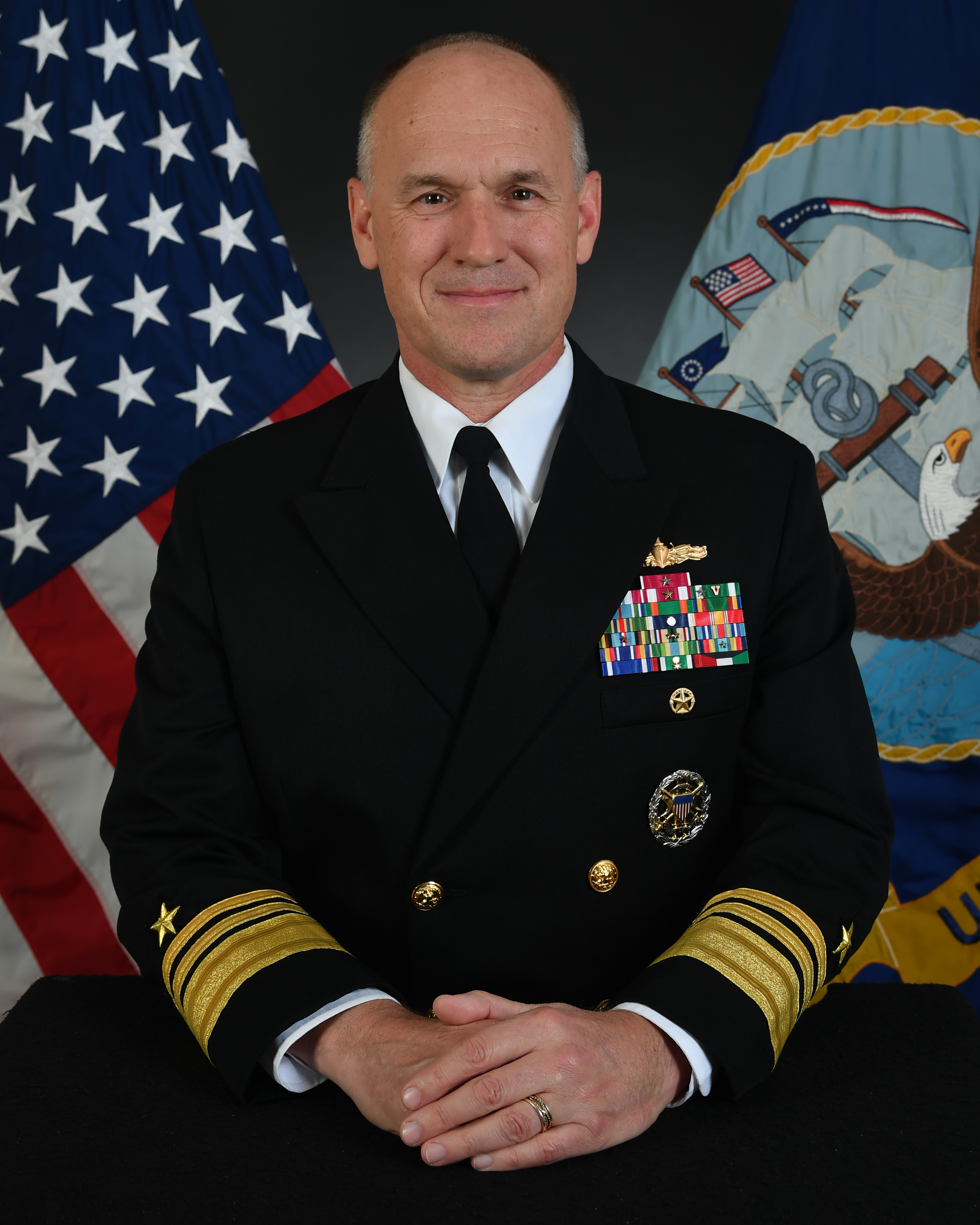
- Black in 2019
- Born: 1964 (age 61–62)
- Education: United States Naval Academy (BS); Naval Postgraduate School (MS)
- Military career
- Allegiance: United States
- Branch: United States Navy
- Service years: 1986–2024
- Rank: Vice Admiral
- Nickname: Gene
- Commands: United States Sixth Fleet; Carrier Strike Group Eight; USS Leyte Gulf (CG 55); USS Mason (DDG 87)
- Conflicts: Gulf War
- Awards: Legion of Merit (7)

Eugene Henry Black III (born 1964) is a retired United States Navy vice admiral and career surface warfare officer who last served as the deputy chief of naval operations for operations, plans and strategy from 2022 to 2024. He previously served as the 30th Commander of United States Sixth Fleet, deputy commander of United States Naval Forces Europe, deputy commander of United States Naval Forces Africa, and as the Joint Force Maritime Component Commander from 2020 to 2022.

== Early life and education ==
A New Jersey native, Black graduated from Monmouth Regional High School. He is a 1986 graduate of the United States Naval Academy, where he earned a Bachelor of Science degree in Political Science. He later earned a Master of Science degree in Management from the Naval Postgraduate School in Monterey, California in March 1994.

== Naval career ==
At sea, Black served as commanding officer of USS Leyte Gulf (CG 55) from January 2010 until November 2011. While in command, Leyte Gulf deployed to the Persian Gulf and North Arabian Sea. Black commanded USS Mason (DDG 87) from May 2004 until January 2006, also deployed to the Persian Gulf.

Black's other sea duty assignments include executive officer on USS Ramage (DDG 61), weapons officer and combat systems officer on board USS Normandy (CG 60), fire control officer on USS Leyte Gulf, combat information center officer and damage control assistant on board USS Gallery (FFG-26) and the staff of the Commander, South Atlantic Force, United States Atlantic Fleet.

Black's shore duty assignments include director, Surface Warfare Officer Distribution, Navy Personnel Command, Millington, Tennessee; Future Ships branch head, Surface Warfare Directorate (N86) on the staff of the Chief of Naval Operations; and Afghanistan/Pakistan Politico-Military Policy branch head, Joint Staff, Strategic Plans and Policy (J5), in Washington, D.C. Other assignments include Commander detailer, Navy Personnel Command and Surface Warfare Officer School department head instructor, Newport, Rhode Island.

For his first flag officer assignment, he served as deputy commander, United States Naval Forces Central Command/United States Fifth Fleet, Manama, Bahrain from June 2015 until July 2017. Following this assignment, he commanded Carrier Strike Group Eight from September 2017 to April 2019. He served as the director, Surface Warfare Division, N96, Office of the Chief of Naval Operations in Washington, D.C. from May 2019 to May 2020.

Black assumed duties as commander of United States Sixth Fleet, deputy commander of United States Naval Forces Europe and United States Naval Forces Africa, and as Joint Force Maritime Component Commander in June 2020, and served in this position until September 2022.

In April 2022, Black was nominated for appointment as deputy chief of naval operations for operations, plans, and strategy.

Military offices
Preceded by ???	Deputy Commander of the United States Naval Forces Central Command; 2015–2017	Succeeded by Paul J. Schlise
Preceded by Dale E. Horan	Commander of Carrier Strike Group 8; 2017–2019	Succeeded by Andrew Loiselle
Preceded by Ronald A. Boxall	Director of Surface Warfare of the United States Navy; 2019–2020	Succeeded by Paul J. Schlise
Preceded by Lisa M. Franchetti	Commander of the United States Sixth Fleet and Naval Striking and Support Forces NATO; 2020–2022	Succeeded by Thomas Ishee
Preceded by William R. Merz	Deputy Chief of Naval Operations for Operations, Plans and Strategy of the United States Navy; 2022–2024	Succeeded by Daniel Dwyer
