= Scott Fry =

Scott Allen Fry
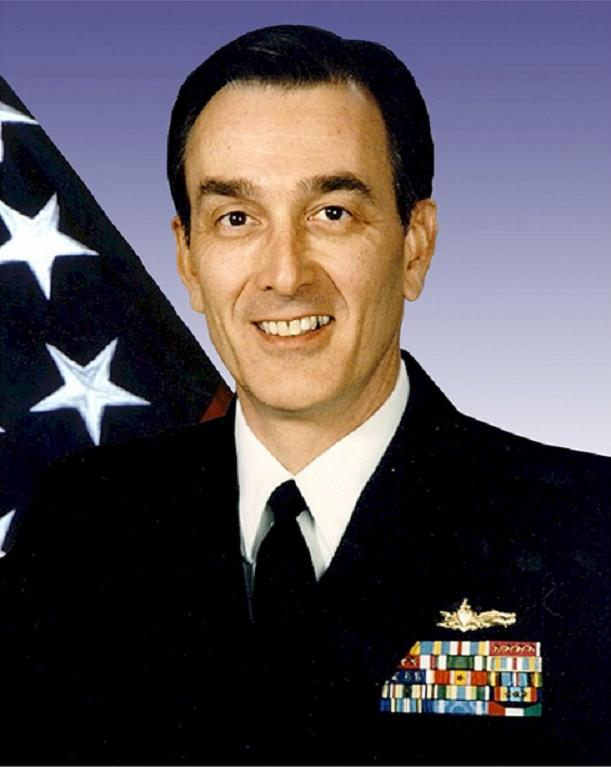
- Born: 1949 (age 76–77); Bellefonte, Pennsylvania
- Military career
- Allegiance: United States
- Branch: United States Navy
- Service years: 1971–2003
- Rank: Vice Admiral
- Commands: USS McCloy (FF-1038); USS Conolly (DD-979); Cruiser-Destroyer Group 8
- Awards: Defense Distinguished Service Medal (2); Navy Distinguished Service Medal; Defense Superior Service Medal; Legion of Merit (5); Meritorious Service Medal (3); Navy Commendation Medal

Vice Admiral Scott Allen Fry (born Bellefonte, Pennsylvania), is a former Director of the Joint Staff for the United States Department of Defense.

Before selection to flag rank, he served as the executive assistant to the Chief of Naval Operations, and tours as division officer, department head, and executive officer aboard the McCloy, Grand Rapids and Julius A. Furer, and on the staff of Commander Destroyer Squadron 4.

== Naval career ==
Fry attended public schools in Dallas, Pennsylvania, and entered the United States Naval Academy in Annapolis, Maryland, in 1967. Upon graduation, Fry was commissioned as a naval officer in June 1971. His initial assignment, beginning July 1971, was aboard the McCloy (FF-1038) as Communications Officer, where he served until September 1973. He next served as executive officer aboard the Grand Rapids (PG-98), homeported in Naples, Italy, from January 1974 to December 1975.

After additional training, he served as operations officer aboard the Julius A. Furer (FFG-6) from October 1976, until August 1978. From August 1978, to March 1980, he served on the staff of commander, Destroyer Squadron Four in Charleston, South Carolina. From March, 1980, to March, 1983, Fry was assigned to the Bureau of Naval Personnel, serving as Cruiser/Destroyer Atlantic Fleet Placement Officer and Assistant Surface Captain Detailer. From August 1983, until July 1985 he returned to serve aboard the McCloy as commanding officer. From August, 1985, to May 1986, he served as the Third Battalion Officer, stationed at the United States Naval Academy, in Annapolis, Maryland, then served as executive assistant to the superintendent of the academy, until September, 1988.

From October 7, 1988 until November 2, 1990, Fry was the commander on board the Conolly (DD-979), after which he served as an executive assistant to the Assistant Secretary of the Navy in Washington, D.C. until June, 1992. From July, 1992, through September, 1993, he was the Commander of Destroyer Squadron 32. By October 1993, Fry returned to Naples, becoming the executive assistant to the Commander in Chief, U.S. Naval Forces Europe/Allied Forces Southern Europe.

=== Flag rank ===
In April, 1994, he returned to Washington, D.C., as executive assistant to the Chief of Naval Operations. From June, 1995 to July, 1997, he served as deputy director for strategy and policy, as a joint staff officer.

In August, 1997, Fry returned to sea as commander of Cruiser-Destroyer Group 8, Dwight D. Eisenhower Battle Group, leading a Mediterranean/Persian Gulf deployment from June 1998 until that November, when he became director for operations, Joint Staff.

Fry's final assignment, as commander of Naval Striking and Support Forces Southern Europe, began in October, 2001, shortly after the September 11, 2001 attacks. He retired from active duty in 2003.

He is married, and he and his wife have three daughters, five grandsons, and two granddaughters.

== Awards and decorations ==

Surface Warfare Officer Pin
Defense Distinguished Service Medal with one bronze oak leaf cluster
Navy Distinguished Service Medal	Defense Superior Service Medal	Legion of Merit with four gold award stars
Meritorious Service Medal with two award stars	Navy and Marine Corps Commendation Medal	Joint Meritorious Unit Award
Navy E Ribbon with three Battle E devices	National Defense Service Medal with two bronze service stars	Armed Forces Expeditionary Medal
Southwest Asia Service Medal with service star	Armed Forces Service Medal	Navy Sea Service Deployment Ribbon with three service stars
Special Operations Service Ribbon	NATO Medal for the former Yugoslavia	Kuwait Liberation Medal (Kuwait)
