= William N. Small =

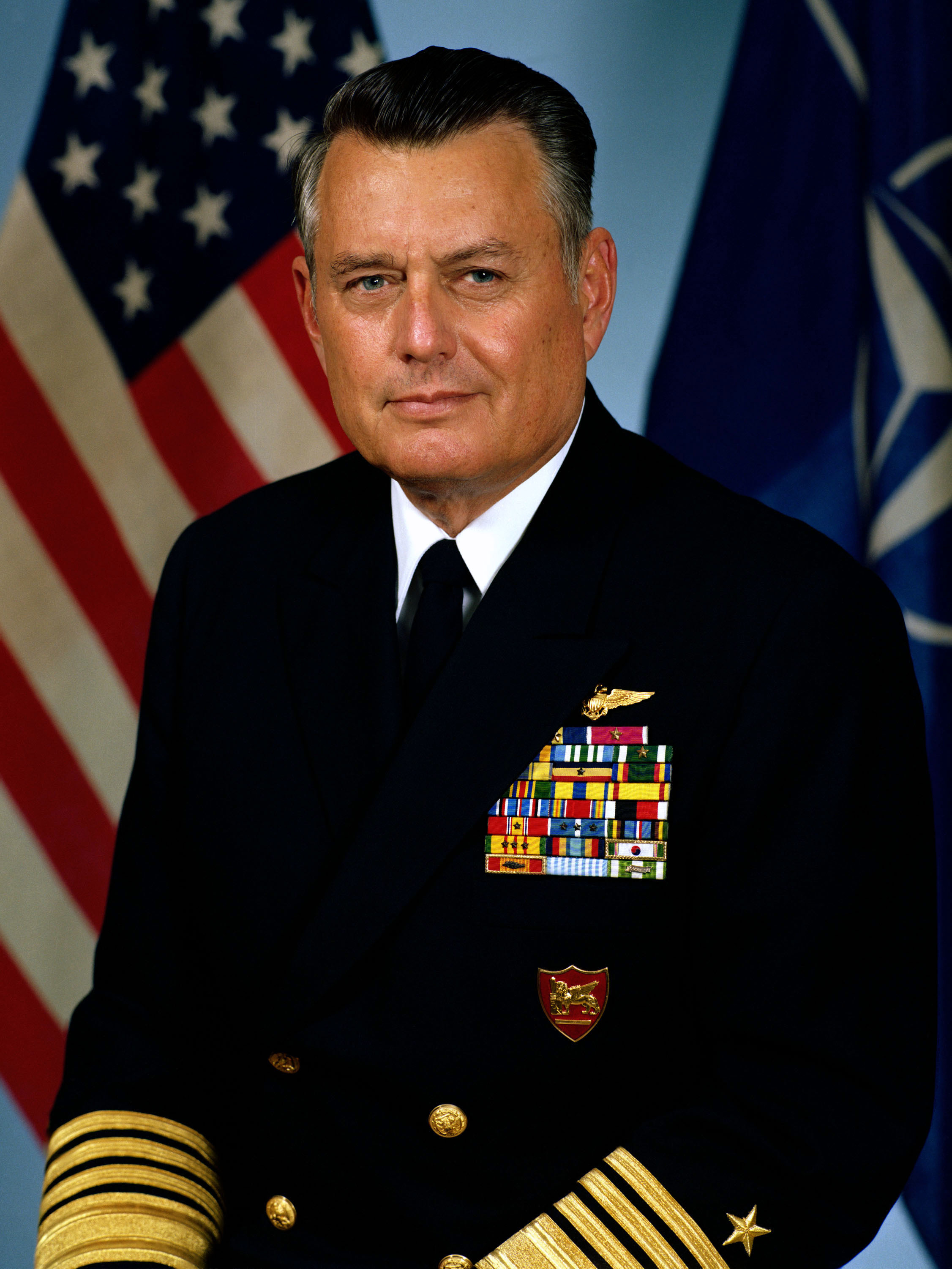
- Admiral William N. Small in 1983
- Born: February 22, 1927; Little Rock, Arkansas, US
- Died: December 9, 2016 (aged 89); Virginia Beach, Virginia, US
- Military career
- Branch: United States Navy
- Service years: 1948–1985
- Rank: Admiral
- Nickname: "Smally"
- Commands: Allied Forces Southern Europe; United States Naval Forces Europe; Vice Chief of Naval Operations; United States Sixth Fleet; Carrier Division 3 USS Independence (CV 62); VA-65; VA-42
- Conflicts: World War II; Korean War; Vietnam War
- Awards: Navy Distinguished Service Medal (2); Legion of Merit (2)

William Newell Small (February 22, 1927 – December 9, 2016) was a four star admiral in the United States Navy who served as Vice Chief of Naval Operations and Commander in Chief, NATO Allied Forces Southern Europe and United States Naval Forces Europe.

== Early life and education ==
Born in Little Rock, Arkansas, on February 22, 1927, Small graduated from Malvern High School at the age of 15, attending Admiral Farragut Military Academy in Pine Beach, New Jersey until he was old enough to receive his appointment to the United States Naval Academy, class of 1948. He later completed the Command and Staff Course at the Naval War College in 1962.

== Naval career ==
Small served as Executive Officer of USS Forrestal (CV 59) and as Commanding officer of Fighter Attack Squadron Four Two (VA-42), Fighter Attack Squadron Six Five (VA-65), and USS Independence (CV 62). As a Flag Officer, he served as Commander Carrier Division 3, Pacific from 1975 to 1976; and Commander United States Sixth Fleet.

Small was Vice Chief of Naval Operations from 1981 to 1983 and Commander in Chief, United States Naval Forces Europe/Commander in Chief, Allied Forces Southern Europe from 1983 to 1985.

The Arkansas Aviation Historical Society inducted Small into the Arkansas Aviation Hall of Fame in 1992. He died on December 9, 2016, at the age of 89.

== Decorations and medals ==

Naval Aviator Badge
1st Row	Navy Distinguished Service Medal with one gold award star		Legion of Merit with award star
2nd row	Air Medal	Joint Service Commendation Medal	Navy and Marine Corps Commendation Medal with award star
3rd row	Air Force Commendation Medal	Navy Presidential Unit Citation with one bronze service star	Navy Unit Commendation
4th row	Navy Meritorious Unit Commendation	Navy Expeditionary Medal	China Service Medal
5th row	American Campaign Medal	World War II Victory Medal	Navy Occupation Service Medal
6th Row	National Defense Service Medal with one bronze service star	Korean Service Medal with three service stars	Armed Forces Expeditionary Medal
7th Row	Vietnam Service Medal with three service stars	Navy Sea Service Deployment Ribbon	Republic of Korea Presidential Unit Citation
7th row	Vietnam Gallantry Cross Unit Citation	United Nations Korea Medal	Vietnam Campaign Medal

Military offices
Preceded by James D. Watkins	Vice Chief of Naval Operations; 1981–1983	Succeeded by Ronald J. Hays
