= Donald L. Pilling =

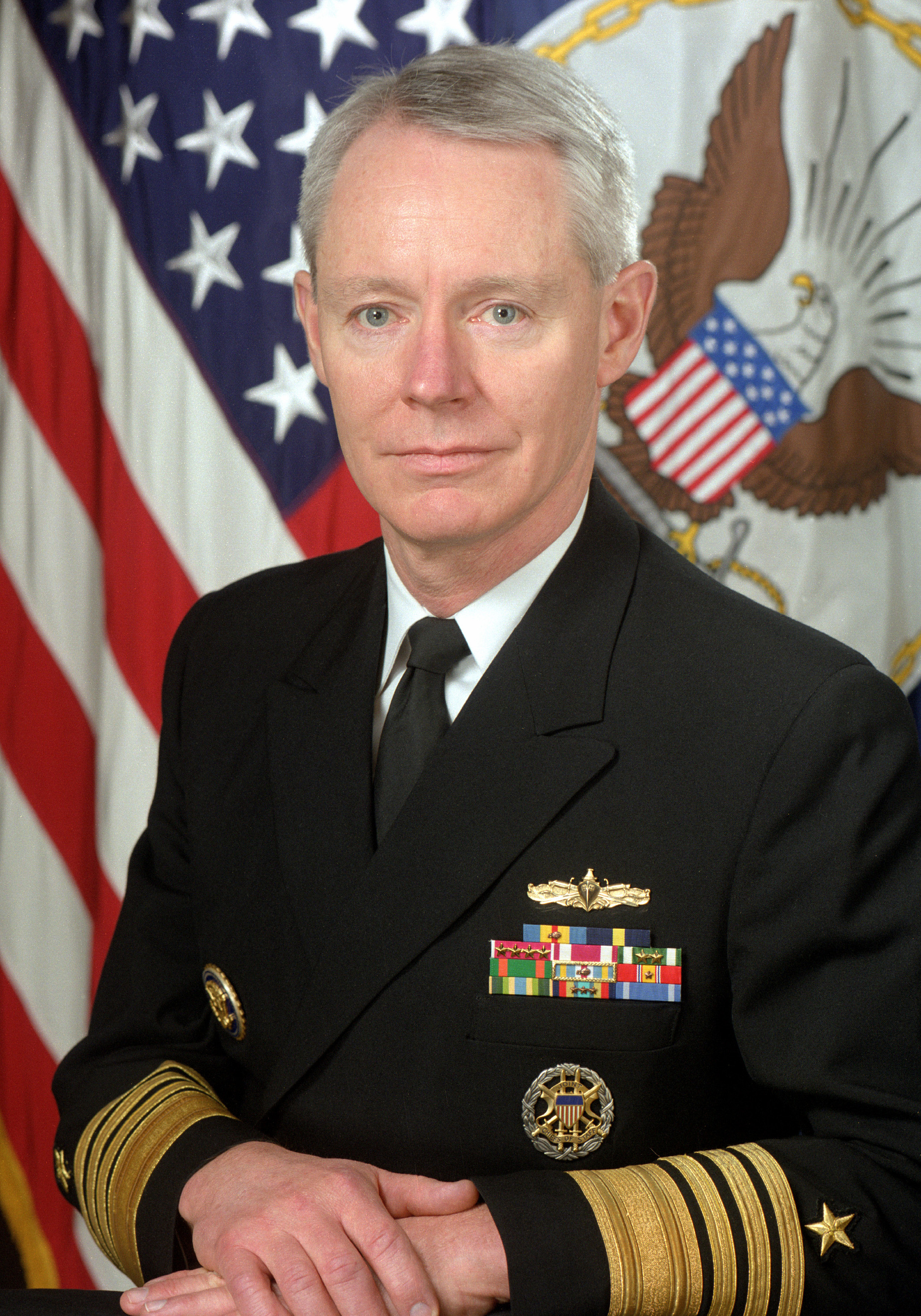
- Admiral Donald L. Pilling
- Born: June 4, 1943; Bayside, New York, U.S.
- Died: May 26, 2008 (aged 64); Bethesda, Maryland, U.S.
- Military career
- Branch: United States Navy
- Service years: 1965–2000
- Rank: Admiral
- Commands: Sixth Fleet; USS Dahlgren
- Awards: Legion of Merit (5)
- Other work: President & CEO, Logistics Management Institute; Member, Defense Science Board; Member, Council on Foreign Relations

Donald Lee Pilling (June 4, 1943 – May 26, 2008) was a four-star United States Navy admiral who served as Vice Chief of Naval Operations from 1997 to 2000.

== Military career ==
A 1965 graduate of the United States Naval Academy, Pilling's sea experience concerned destroyers. He commanded USS Dahlgren (DDG-43), was Commander of Destroyer Squadron 26, Commander, Cruiser Group 12, Commander, Saratoga Battle Group, Commander, United States Sixth Fleet and Commander, Naval Striking and Support Forces Southern Europe.

Ashore, Admiral Pilling was assigned to a variety of defense resources and planning billets. From 1973 to 1977, he served in the Office of the Secretary of Defense (PA&E) where he was responsible for the resource analysis of all U.S. and foreign tactical aircraft and missile programs. From 1980 to 1983 he was on the personal staff of the Chief of Naval Operations, responsible for monitoring trends in the international environment and their implications for future naval forces.

As a Federal Executive Fellow at the Brookings Institution (1985–1986), he studied defense acquisition and national security issues. From 1986 to 1988, Admiral Pilling was assigned to the Office of the Chief of Naval Operations where he was responsible for the development of the Navy Five-Year Defense Plan (FYDP). A member of the National Security Council staff from 1989 until July 1992, Pilling had broad responsibilities in foreign policy and national security issues. From 1993 to 1995, he was the Director for Programming (N80) on the staff of the Chief of Naval Operations and served as Deputy Chief of Naval Operations, Resources, Warfare Requirements and Assessments (N8) from July 1996 to November 1997. He assumed duties as the 30th Vice Chief of Naval Operations in November 1997.

Pilling was awarded a Ph.D. in mathematics from the University of Cambridge in 1970, with a dissertation titled The Algebra of Operators for Regular Events. He has published articles in both mathematical and professional journals and is also the author of a monograph, Competition in Defense Procurement, published in 1989 by the Brookings Institution.

== Awards and decorations ==

Badge	Surface Warfare Officer Pin		
1st row	Defense Distinguished Service Medal with one bronze oak leaf cluster		Navy Distinguished Service Medal
2nd row	Legion of Merit with four gold award stars	Meritorious Service Medal with two award stars	Navy and Marine Corps Commendation Medal with two award stars
3rd row	Navy and Marine Corps Achievement Medal	Joint Meritorious Unit Award with oak leaf cluster	National Defense Service Medal with one bronze service star
4th row	Armed Forces Service Medal	Navy Sea Service Deployment Ribbon with three service stars	NATO Medal for the former Yugoslavia
Badge	Joint Chiefs of Staff Badge		
Badge	Presidential Service Badge		

== Post military ==
On January 1, 2002, Pilling became President and Chief Executive Officer Logistics Management Institute, a government consulting firm. He was also a member of the Defense Science Board, the Council on Foreign Relations, and the White House Fellows Commission. He was on the Board of Trustees/Advisors at the Naval War College, the Applied Physics Laboratory of the Johns Hopkins University, and the National Defense Industrial Association. He was also a Fellow of the National Academy of Public Administration.

Admiral Pilling lived in Bayside, New York, and was married to Barbara Pilling (née Orbon).

Donald Pilling died from leukemia on May 26, 2008. Funeral services took place on May 30, 2008, at the U.S. Naval Academy, Annapolis, Maryland.
