= John H. Cassady =

United States Navy admiral

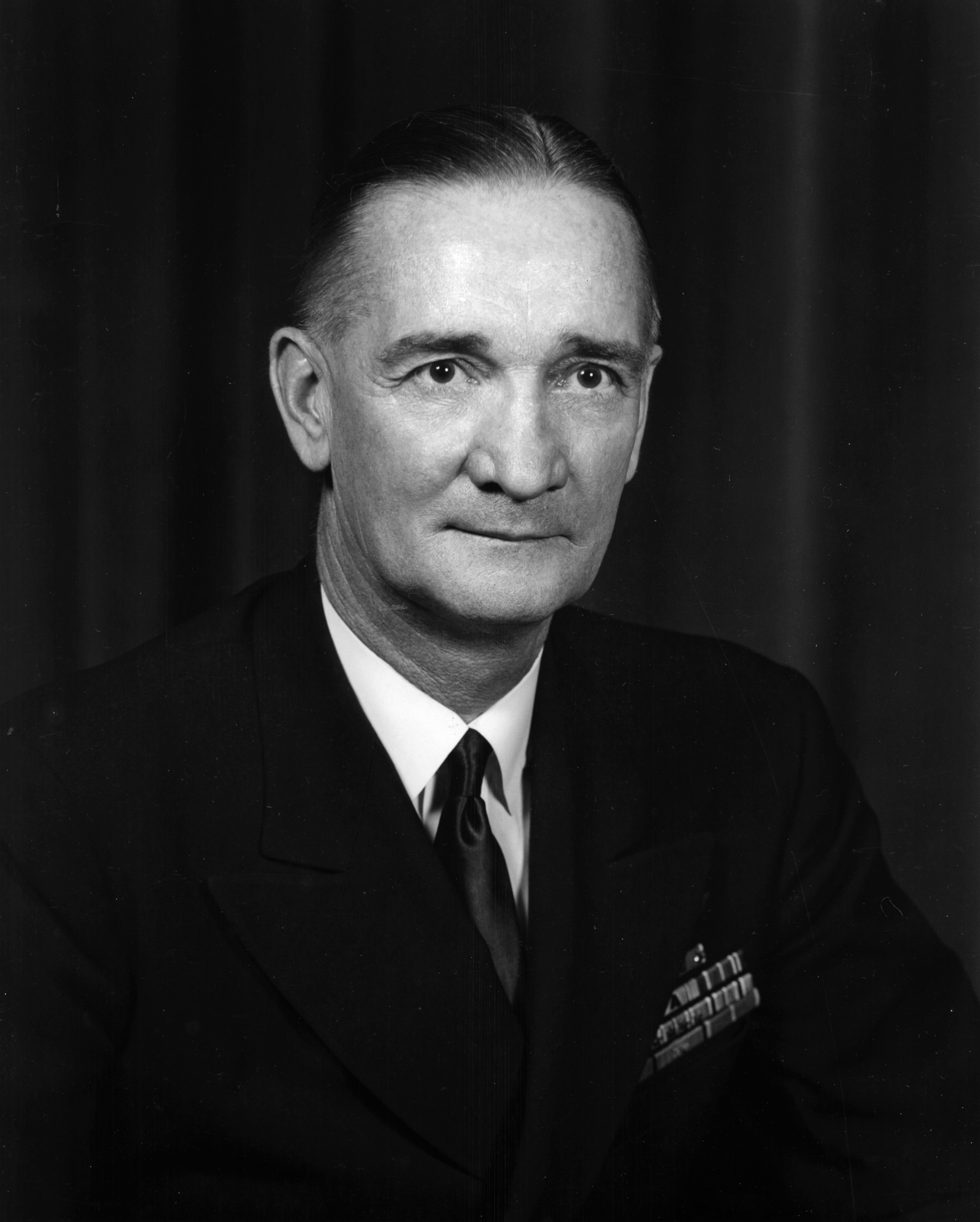
- Admiral John H. Cassady
- Born: April 3, 1896; Spencer, Indiana, US
- Died: January 25, 1969 (aged 72); Boca Raton, Florida, US
- Burial place: Arlington National Cemetery
- Military career
- Allegiance: United States
- Branch: United States Navy
- Service years: 1919–1956
- Rank: Admiral
- Commands: United States Naval Forces, Eastern Atlantic and Mediterranean; United States Sixth Fleet; Carrier Division Four; USS Saratoga
- Conflicts: World War I World War II
- Awards: Legion of Merit (3)

John Howard Cassady (April 3, 1896 – January 25, 1969) was an admiral in the United States Navy. He was Commander in Chief, United States Naval Forces, Eastern Atlantic and Mediterranean from 1954 to 1956. Prior to his assignment, Cassady had served as Deputy Chief of Naval Operations (Air) from January 1950 to May 1952, commander of USS Saratoga during World War II and Carrier Strike Group 1 immediately after the war, and commander of the United States Sixth Fleet from 1952 to 1954. He died in 1969 in Boca Raton, Florida, and was buried in Arlington National Cemetery.
