= Gerald E. Miller =

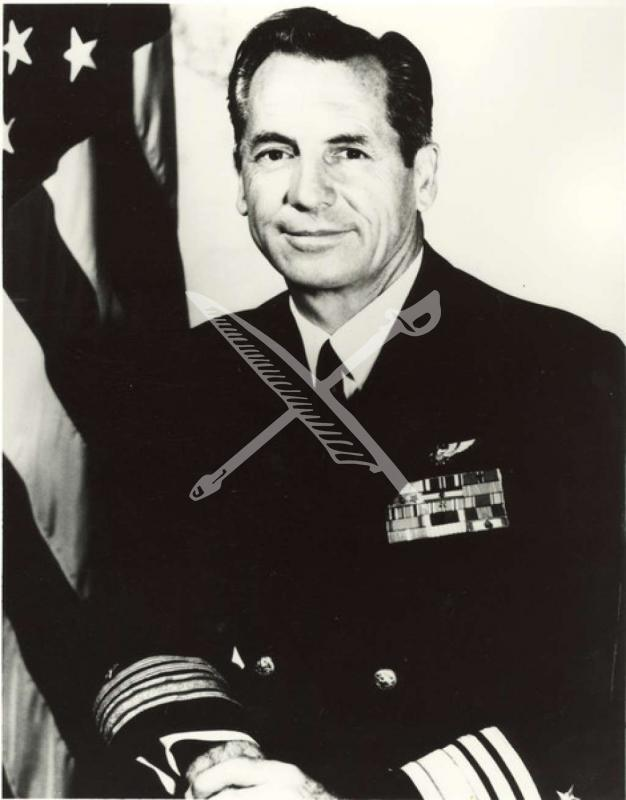
- Born: July 1, 1919; Sheridan, Wyoming, United States
- Died: November 6, 2014 (aged 95); Oakton, Virginia, United States
- Military career
- Allegiance: United States
- Branch: United States Navy
- Service years: 1936–1974
- Rank: Vice admiral
- Nickname: Jerry
- Commands: United States Sixth Fleet
- Conflicts: World War II; Korean War; Vietnam War

Gerald Edward Miller (July 1, 1919 – November 6, 2014) was a vice admiral in the United States Navy. He was a commander of the United States Sixth Fleet (from October 1971 – June 1973). He graduated in 1942 from the United States Naval Academy. Miller died of cancer in 2014 at his home in Oakton, Virginia.
