= List of United States Navy vice admirals from 2000 to 2009 =

Flag of a Navy vice admiral

The rank of vice admiral (or three-star admiral) is the second-highest rank normally achievable in the United States Navy, and the first to have a specified number of appointments set by statute. It ranks above rear admiral (two-star admiral) and below admiral (four-star admiral).

There have been 107 vice admirals in the U.S. Navy from 2000 to 2009, 20 of whom were promoted to four-star admiral. All 107 achieved that rank while on active duty in the U.S. Navy. Admirals entered the Navy via several paths: 57 were commissioned via the U.S. Naval Academy (USNA), 29 via Naval Reserve Officers Training Corps (NROTC) at a civilian university, 10 via Officer Candidate School (OCS), five via Aviation Officer Candidate School (AOCS), four via direct commission (direct), one via the U.S. Merchant Marine Academy (USMMA), and one via direct commission inter-service transfer from the U.S. Army (USA).

== List of admirals ==
Entries in the following list of vice admirals are indexed by the numerical order in which each officer was promoted to that rank while on active duty, or by an asterisk (*) if the officer did not serve in that rank while on active duty. Each entry lists the admiral's name, date of rank, (Note: Dates of rank are taken, where available, from the U.S. Navy register of active and retired commissioned officers, or from the flag officer's official biography. The date listed is that of the officer's first promotion to vice admiral. If such a date that qualifies for the above cannot be found, the next date substituted should be that of the officer's assumption of his/her first three-star appointment. Failing which, the officer's first Senate confirmation date to vice admiral should be substituted. For officers promoted to vice admiral on the same date, they should be organized first by officers promoted to four-star rank, number of years spent as a vice admiral, then by the tier of their first listed assignment upon promotion to vice admiral (joint assignments followed by service assignments).) active-duty positions held while serving at three-star rank, (Note: Positions listed are those held by the officer when promoted to vice admiral. Dates listed are for the officer's full tenure, which may predate promotion to three-star rank or postdate retirement from active duty. Positions held in an acting capacity are italicized.) number of years of active-duty service at three-star rank (Yrs), (Note: The number of years of active-duty service at three-star rank is approximated by subtracting the year in the "Date of rank" column from the last year in the "Position" column. Time spent between active-duty three-star assignments is not counted.) year commissioned and source of commission, (Note: The year commissioned is taken to be the year the officer graduated from the U.S. Naval Academy, or equivalent. Sources of commission are listed in parentheses after the year of commission and include: the United States Naval Academy (USNA); Naval Reserve Officers Training Corps (NROTC) at a civilian university; NROTC at a senior military college such as the Virginia Military Institute (VMI), Norwich University (Norwich), Pennsylvania Military College (PMC), or Widener University (Widener); Officer Candidate School (OCS); the United States Merchant Marine Academy (USMMA); the Massachusetts Maritime Academy (MMA); United States Military Academy (USMA); and the United States Air Force Academy (USAFA).) number of years in commission when promoted to three-star rank (YC), (Note: The number of years in commission before being promoted to three-star rank is approximated by subtracting the year in the "Commission" column from the year in the "Date of rank" column.) and other biographical notes. (Note: Notes include years of birth and death; awards of the Medal of Honor, Congressional Gold Medal, Presidential Medal of Freedom, or honors of similar significance; major government appointments; university presidencies or equivalents; familial relationships with significant military officers or significant government officials such as U.S. Presidents, cabinet secretaries, U.S. Senators, or state governors; and unusual career events such as premature relief or death in office.)

List of U.S. Navy vice admirals from 2000 to 2009
#	Name	Photo	Date of rank	Position	Yrs	Commission	YC	Notes
1	Gordon S. Holder		1 Mar 2000	Commander, Military Sealift Command (COMMSC), 1999–2001.; Director, Logistics, Joint Staff, J4, 2001–2004.	4	1968 (OCS)	32	(1946– )
2	Joseph W. Dyer Jr.		30 Jun 2000	Commander, Naval Air Systems Command (COMNAVAIR), 2000–2003.	3	1970 (AOCS) (Note: Commissioned via the Aviation Reserve Officer Candidate (AVROC) Program.)	30	(1947– )
3	John J. Grossenbacher		4 Jul 2000	Commander, Submarine Force, U.S. Atlantic Fleet/Commander, Submarine Allied Command Atlantic/Commander, Task Force 84 (COMSUBLANT/COMSUBACLANT/CTF-84), 2000–2001.; Commander, Naval Submarine Forces/Commander, Submarine Force, U.S. Atlantic Fleet/Commander, Submarine Allied Command Atlantic/Commander, Task Force 144/Commander, Task Force 84 (COMNAVSUBFOR/COMSUBLANT/COMSUBACLANT/CTF-144/CTF-84), 2001–2003.	3	1970 (USNA)	30	(1946– ) (Note: Nomination to be Chairman, Nuclear Regulatory Commission withdrawn, 2004.)
4	Paul G. Gaffney II		7 Jul 2000	President, National Defense University (P-NDU), 2000–2003.	3	1968 (USNA)	32	(1946– ) President, Monmouth University, 2003–2013; Chair, Ocean Exploration Advisory Board, 2014–2017.
5	James W. Metzger		12 Jul 2000	Commander, U.S. Seventh Fleet (COMSEVENTHFLT), 2000–2002.; Assistant to the Chairman of the Joint Chiefs of Staff (ACJCS), 2002–2005.	5	1971 (USNA)	29	(1949– )
6	Michael D. Haskins		31 Jul 2000	Naval Inspector General (NAVIG), 2000–2003.	3	1966 (USNA)	34	(1942– ) President, Vice Admiral James B. Stockdale Center for Ethical Leadership, 2005–2007.
*	John B. Nathman		1 Aug 2000	Commander, Naval Air Force, U.S. Pacific Fleet (COMNAVAIRPAC), 2000–2001.; Commander, Naval Air Forces/Commander, Naval Air Force, U.S. Pacific Fleet (COMNAVAIRFOR/COMNAVAIRPAC), 2001–2002.; Deputy Chief of Naval Operations, Warfare Requirements and Programs (DCNO N6/N7), 2002–2004.	4	1970 (USNA)	30	(1948– ) (Note: Served as Vice Chief of Naval Operations (VCNO).) Promoted to admiral, 1 Dec 2004.
7	Toney M. Bucchi		6 Oct 2000	Commander, U.S. Third Fleet (COMTHIRDFLT), 2000–2003.	3	1970 (NROTC)	30	(1946– )
8	Richard W. Mayo		16 Oct 2000	Director, Space, Information Warfare, Command and Control, Office of the Chief of Naval Operations (OPNAV N6), 1999–2002.; Commander, Naval Network Warfare Command (COMNAVNETWARCOM), 2002–2004.	4	1968 (NROTC)	32	(1946– )
*	Timothy J. Keating		1 Nov 2000	Deputy Chief of Naval Operations, Plans, Policy and Operations (DCNO N3/N5), 2000–2002.; Commander, U.S. Naval Forces Central Command/Commander, U.S. Fifth Fleet/Commander, Combined Maritime Forces (COMUSNAVCENT/COMFIFTHFLT/COMCMF), 2002–2003.; Director, Joint Staff (DJS), 2003–2004.	5	1971 (USNA)	29	(1949– ) (Note: Served as a combatant commander (CCDR).) (Note: Served as Commander, North American Aerospace Defense Command (CDRNORAD).) Promoted to admiral, 1 Jan 2005.
*	Michael G. Mullen		1 Nov 2000	Commander, U.S. Second Fleet/Commander, Striking Fleet Atlantic (COMSECONDFLT/COMSTRIKFLTLANT), 2000–2001.; Deputy Chief of Naval Operations, Resources, Requirements, and Assessments (DCNO N8), 2001–2003.	3	1968 (USNA)	32	(1946– ) (Note: Served as Chief of Naval Operations (CNO).) (Note: Served as Chairman, Joint Chiefs of Staff (CJCS).) Promoted to admiral, 28 Aug 2003.
9	Martin J. Mayer		22 Nov 2000	Deputy Commander in Chief, U.S. Joint Forces Command (DCINCJFCOM), 2000–2002.; Deputy Commander, U.S. Joint Forces Command (DCDRUSJFCOM), 2002–2003.	3	1966 (OCS)	34	(1944– )
10	Malcolm I. Fages		1 May 2001	Deputy Chairman, NATO Military Committee (DCMC), 2001–2004.	3	1969 (NROTC)	32	(1946– )
11	Albert H. Konetzni Jr.		4 May 2001	Deputy/Chief of Staff, U.S. Atlantic Fleet, 2001–2002.; Deputy Commander/Chief of Staff, U.S. Fleet Forces Command and U.S. Atlantic Fleet (DCOMFLTFORCOM/DCOMLANTFLT), 2002–2004.	3	1966 (USNA)	35	(1944– )
12	Timothy W. LaFleur		18 May 2001	Commander, Naval Surface Force, U.S. Pacific Fleet (COMNAVSURFPAC), 2001.; Commander, Naval Surface Forces/Commander, Naval Surface Force, U.S. Pacific Fleet (COMNAVSURFOR/COMNAVSURFPAC), 2001–2005.	4	1970 (USNA)	31	(1948– )
13	Alfred G. Harms Jr.		24 May 2001	Chief, Naval Education and Training (CNET), 2001–2003.; Commander, Naval Education and Training Command (COMNETC), 2003–2004.	3	1971 (NROTC)	30	(1949– ) President, Lake Highland Preparatory School, 2017–2022.
14	John B. Totushek		7 Jun 2001	Chief, U.S. Naval Reserve/Commander, Naval Reserve Force/Director, U.S. Naval Reserve (CHNAVRES/CNRF/DNR), 1998–2003.	2	1966 (NROTC)	35	(1944– ) First active-duty Navy Reserve officer to achieve the rank of vice admiral.
15	Keith W. Lippert		20 Jul 2001	Director, Defense Logistics Agency (DIRDLA), 2001–2006.	5	1968 (NROTC)	33	(1947– ) Supply Corps.
16	J. Cutler Dawson Jr.		27 Jul 2001	Commander, U.S. Second Fleet/Commander, Striking Fleet Atlantic (COMSECONDFLT/COMSTRIKFLTLANT), 2001–2003.; Deputy Chief of Naval Operations, Resources, Requirements, and Assessments (DCNO N8), 2003–2004.	3	1970 (USNA)	31	(1948– )
17	Michael L. Cowan		10 Aug 2001	Surgeon General, U.S. Navy/Chief, Bureau of Medicine and Surgery (SGN/BUMED), 2001–2004.	3	1971 (direct)	30	(1944–2023) Medical Corps.
18	Richard J. Naughton		7 Jun 2002	Superintendent, U.S. Naval Academy, 2002–2003.	1	1968 (USNA)	34	(1946–2011) (Note: Resigned, June 2003, and retired as rear admiral.) Resigned, 2003.
19	Phillip M. Balisle		28 Jun 2002	Commander, Naval Sea Systems Command (COMNAVSEA), 2002–2005.	3	1970 (OCS)	32	(1948– )
*	Robert F. Willard		18 Jul 2002	Commander, U.S. Seventh Fleet (COMSEVENTHFLT), 2002–2004.; Director, Force Structure, Resources and Assessment, Joint Staff, J8, 2004–2005.	3	1973 (USNA)	29	(1950– ) Promoted to admiral, 18 Mar 2005.
20	Michael D. Malone		2 Aug 2002	Commander, Naval Air Forces/Commander, Naval Air Force, U.S. Pacific Fleet (COMNAVAIRFOR/COMNAVAIRPAC), 2002–2004.	2	1970 (USNA)	32	(1948–2019)
21	Kevin P. Green		18 Sep 2002	Deputy Chief of Naval Operations, Plans, Policy and Operations (DCNO N3/N5), 2002–2004.	2	1971 (USNA)	31	(1949– )
22	Gerald L. Hoewing		1 Oct 2002	Deputy Chief of Naval Operations, Manpower and Personnel/Chief of Naval Personnel (DCNO N1/CNP), 2002–2005.	3	1971 (NROTC)	31	(1949– )
23	Lowell E. Jacoby		17 Oct 2002	Director, Defense Intelligence Agency (DIRDIA), 2002–2005.	3	1969 (AOCS)	33	(1945– ) Director of Naval Intelligence, 1997–1999.
24	David L. Brewer III		23 Oct 2002	Commander, Military Sealift Command (COMMSC), 2001–2006.	4	1970 (NROTC)	32	(1946– ) Superintendent, Los Angeles Unified School District, 2006–2009.
25	Stanley R. Szemborski		19 Nov 2002	Principal Deputy Director, Program Analysis and Evaluation, Office of the Secretary of Defense, 2002–2007.	5	1971 (USNA)	31	(1949– )
26	Albert T. Church III		Mar 2003	Naval Inspector General (NAVIG), 2003–2004.; Director, Navy Staff (DNS/N09B), 2004–2005.	2	1969 (USNA)	34	(1947– ) First cousin once removed of U.S. Senator Frank Church.
27	Michael J. McCabe		28 May 2003	Commander, U.S. Third Fleet (COMTHIRDFLT), 2003–2005.	2	1970 (AOCS)	33	(1948– )
28	Rodney P. Rempt		1 Aug 2003	Superintendent, U.S. Naval Academy, 2003–2007.	4	1966 (USNA)	37	(1945– ) President, Naval War College, 2001–2003.
*	Gary Roughead		15 Aug 2003	Commander, U.S. Second Fleet/Commander, Striking Fleet Atlantic/Commander, Naval Forces North Fleet East/Commander, Joint Task Force 120/Commander, Joint Task Force 950 (COMSECONDFLT/COMSTRIKFLTLANT/COMNAVNFE/CDRJTF 120/CDRJTF 950), 2003–2004.; Deputy Commander, U.S. Pacific Command (DCDRUSPACOM), 2004–2005.	2	1973 (USNA)	30	(1951– ) Promoted to admiral, 1 Sep 2005.
*	Eric T. Olson		2 Sep 2003	Deputy Commander, U.S. Special Operations Command (DCDRUSSOCOM), 2003–2007.	4	1973 (USNA)	30	(1952– ) Navy SEAL. Promoted to admiral, 6 Jul 2007. First Navy SEAL to attain rank of vice admiral.
*	Kirkland H. Donald		5 Sep 2003	Commander, Naval Submarine Forces/Commander, Submarine Force, U.S. Atlantic Fleet/Commander, Submarine Allied Command Atlantic/Commander, Task Force 144/Commander, Task Force 84 (COMNAVSUBFOR/COMSUBLANT/COMSUBACLANT/CTF-144/CTF-84), 2003–2004.; Commander, Naval Submarine Forces/Commander, Submarine Force, U.S. Atlantic Fleet/Commander, Allied Submarine Command/Commander, Task Force 144/Commander, Task Force 84 (COMNAVSUBFOR/COMSUBLANT/COMASC/CTF-144/CTF-84), 2004.	1	1975 (USNA)	28	(1953– ) (Note: Served as Director, Naval Reactors.) Promoted to admiral, 1 Jan 2005.
29	David C. Nichols Jr.		7 Oct 2003	Commander, U.S. Naval Forces Central Command/Commander, U.S. Fifth Fleet/Commander, Combined Maritime Forces (COMUSNAVCENT/COMFIFTHFLT/COMCMF), 2003–2005.; Deputy Commander, U.S. Central Command (DCDRUSCENTCOM), 2005–2007.	4	1974 (USA)	29	(1950– ) (Note: Transferred from U.S. Army, 1974.)
30	John G. Cotton		18 Oct 2003	Chief, U.S. Naval Reserve/Commander, Naval Reserve Force (CHNAVRES/CNRF), 2003–2005.; Chief, U.S. Navy Reserve/Commander, Navy Reserve Force (CNR/CNRF), 2005–2008.	5	1973 (USNA)	30	(1951– )
*	Henry G. Ulrich III		4 Nov 2003	Commander, U.S. Sixth Fleet/Commander, Naval Striking and Support Forces Southern Europe (COMSIXTHFLT/COMSTRIKFORSOUTH), 2003–2004.; Commander, U.S. Sixth Fleet/Commander, Allied Joint Force Command Lisbon/Commander, Naval Striking and Support Forces Southern Europe (COMSIXTHFLT/COMJC Lisbon/COMSTRIKFORSOUTH), 2004.; Commander, U.S. Sixth Fleet/Commander, Allied Joint Force Command Lisbon/Commander, Naval Striking and Support Forces NATO (COMSIXTHFLT/COMJC Lisbon/COMSTRIKFORNATO), 2004–2005.	2	1972 (USNA)	31	(1950– ) Promoted to admiral, 22 Jul 2005.
31	Walter B. Massenburg		1 Dec 2003	Commander, Naval Air Systems Command (COMNAVAIR), 2003–2007.	4	1970 (NROTC)	33	(1949– )
32	Albert M. Calland III		26 Mar 2004	Associate Director of Central Intelligence, Military Support (ADCI/MS), 2004–2005.; Deputy Director, Central Intelligence Agency (DD/CIA), 2005–2006.; Deputy Director, Strategic Operational Planning, National Counterterrorism Center, 2006–2007.	3	1974 (USNA)	30	(1952–2023) (Note: Promoted directly from rank of rear admiral (lower half).) Navy SEAL. Resigned as CIA deputy director, 2006.
33	James D. McArthur Jr.		26 Mar 2004	Commander, Naval Network Warfare Command (COMNAVNETWARCOM), 2004.; Commander, Naval Network Warfare Command/Deputy Department of the Navy Chief Information Officer (Navy)/Assistant Chief of Naval Operations, Information Technology (COMNAVNETWARCOM/DCHINFO(N)/ACNO-IT), 2004–2007.	3	1972 (USNA)	32	(1949– )
34	Kevin J. Cosgriff		24 Jun 2004	Deputy Commander/Chief of Staff, U.S. Fleet Forces Command and U.S. Atlantic Fleet (DCOMFLTFORCOM/DCOMLANTFLT), 2004–2006.; Deputy Commander/Chief of Staff, U.S. Fleet Forces Command (DCOMUSFF), 2006–2007.; Commander, U.S. Naval Forces Central Command/Commander, U.S. Fifth Fleet/Commander, Combined Maritime Forces (COMUSNAVCENT/COMFIFTHFLT/COMCMF), 2007–2008.	4	1971 (USMMA)	33	(1949– )
35	Justin D. McCarthy		Aug 2004	Director, Material Readiness and Logistics (N4), 2004–2007.	3	1969 (OCS)	35	(1947– ) Supply Corps.
36	Donald C. Arthur Jr.		3 Aug 2004	Surgeon General, U.S. Navy/Chief, Bureau of Medicine and Surgery (SGN/BUMED), 2004–2007.	3	1974 (direct)	30	(1950– ) Medical Corps.
37	Ronald A. Route		12 Aug 2004	Naval Inspector General (NAVIG), 2004–2007.	3	1971 (USNA)	33	(1949– ) President, Naval War College, 2003–2004; President, Naval Postgraduate School, 2013–2019.
38	James M. Zortman		17 Aug 2004	Commander, Naval Air Forces/Commander, Naval Air Force, U.S. Pacific Fleet (COMNAVAIRFOR/COMNAVAIRPAC), 2004–2007.	3	1973 (USNA)	31	(1951– )
*	James G. Stavridis		1 Sep 2004	Senior Military Assistant to the Secretary of Defense (SMA SecDef), 2004–2006.	2	1976 (USNA)	28	(1955– ) (Note: Served as Supreme Allied Commander Europe (SACEUR).) Promoted to admiral, 18 Oct 2006. Dean, The Fletcher School of Law and Diplomacy, 2013–2018.
*	Mark P. Fitzgerald		1 Oct 2004	Commander, U.S. Second Fleet/Commander, Striking Fleet Atlantic/Commander, Joint Task Force 120 (COMSECONDFLT/COMSTRIKFLTLANT/CDRJTF 120), 2004–2006.; Commander, U.S. Second Fleet/Commander, Striking Fleet Atlantic/Director, Combined Joint Operations from the Sea Center of Excellence (COMSECONDFLT/COMSTRIKFLTLANT/DIRCJOS COE), 2006.; Director, Navy Staff (DNS/N09B), 2006–2007.	3	1973 (NROTC)	31	(1951– ) Promoted to admiral, 30 Nov 2007.
*	Jonathan W. Greenert		1 Oct 2004	Commander, U.S. Seventh Fleet (COMSEVENTHFLT), 2004–2006.; Deputy Chief of Naval Operations, Integration of Capabilities and Resources (DCNO N8), 2006–2007.	3	1975 (USNA)	29	(1953– ) Promoted to admiral, 29 Sep 2007.
39	Charles L. Munns		15 Oct 2004	Commander, Naval Submarine Forces/Commander, Submarine Force, U.S. Atlantic Fleet/Commander, Allied Submarine Command/Commander, Task Force 144/Commander, Task Force 84 (COMNAVSUBFOR/COMSUBLANT/COMASC/CTF-144/CTF-84), 2004–2006.; Commander, Naval Submarine Forces/Commander, Submarine Force Atlantic/Commander, Allied Submarine Command/Commander, Task Force 144/Commander, Task Force 84 (COMNAVSUBFOR/COMSUBLANT/COMASC/CTF-144/CTF-84), 2006–2007.; Commander, Naval Submarine Forces/Commander, Submarine Force Atlantic/Commander, Allied Submarine Command/Commander, Task Force 46/Commander, Task Force 82/Commander, Task Force 144/Commander, Task Force 84 (COMNAVSUBFOR/COMSUBLANT/COMASC/CTF-46/CTF-82/CTF-144/CTF-84), 2007.	3	1973 (USNA)	31	(1950– )
40	Lewis W. Crenshaw Jr.		4 Nov 2004	Deputy Chief of Naval Operations, Resources, Requirements and Assessments (DCNO N8), 2004–2006.	2	1974 (USNA)	30	(1952– )
41	Joseph A. Sestak Jr.		17 Nov 2004	Deputy Chief of Naval Operations, Warfare Requirements and Programs (DCNO N6/N7), 2004–2005.	1	1974 (USNA)	30	(1951– ) (Note: Relieved, July 2005, and retired as rear admiral.) Relieved as deputy chief of naval operations, 2005. U.S. Representative from Pennsylvania's 7th congressional district, 2007–2011; Democratic Party nominee for U.S. Senator from Pennsylvania, 2010.
42	J. Kevin Moran		3 Dec 2004	Commander, Naval Education and Training Command (COMNETC), 2004–2006.; Commander, Naval Education and Training Command/Deputy Chief of Naval Personnel (COMNETC/DCNP), 2006–2007.	3	1974 (USNA)	30	(1952– )
43	Terrance T. Etnyre		4 Mar 2005	Commander, Naval Surface Forces/Commander, Naval Surface Force, U.S. Pacific Fleet (COMNAVSURFOR/COMNAVSURFPAC), 2005–2008.	3	1971 (OCS)	34	(1947– )
44	Evan M. Chanik Jr.		17 Mar 2005	Director, Force Structure, Resources and Assessment, Joint Staff, J8, 2005–2006.; Commander, U.S. Second Fleet/Director, Combined Joint Operations from the Sea Center of Excellence (COMSECONDFLT/DIRCJOS COE), 2006–2008.	3	1973 (USNA)	32	(1951– )
45	Barry M. Costello		7 May 2005	Commander, U.S. Third Fleet (COMTHIRDFLT), 2005–2007.	2	1973 (NROTC)	32	(1951– )
46	John D. Stufflebeem		20 May 2005	Commander, U.S. Sixth Fleet/Commander, Allied Joint Force Command Lisbon/Commander, Naval Striking and Support Forces NATO/Commander, NATO Response Force/Deputy Commander, U.S. Naval Forces Europe/Joint Force Maritime Component Commander Europe (COMSIXTHFLT/COMJC Lisbon/COMSTRIKFORNATO/COM- NRF/DCOMUSNAVEUR/JFMCC Europe), 2005–2007.; Director, Navy Staff (DNS/N09B), 2007–2008.	3	1975 (USNA)	30	(1952– ) (Note: Relieved, March 2008, and retired as rear admiral.) Relieved, 2008.
47	Paul E. Sullivan		15 Jul 2005	Commander, Naval Sea Systems Command (COMNAVSEA), 2005–2008.	3	1974 (USNA)	31	(1952– )
48	Ann E. Rondeau		1 Aug 2005	Director, Navy Staff (DNS/N09B), 2005–2006.; Deputy Commander, U.S. Transportation Command (DCDRUSTRANSCOM), 2006–2009.; Commander, U.S. Transportation Command (CDRUSTRANSCOM), 2008.; President, National Defense University (P-NDU), 2009–2012.	7	1974 (OCS)	31	(1951– ) President, College of DuPage, 2016–2018; President, Naval Postgraduate School, 2019–present.
49	John G. Morgan Jr.		15 Aug 2005	Deputy Chief of Naval Operations, Plans, Policy and Operations (DCNO N3/N5), 2005.; Deputy Chief of Naval Operations, Information, Plans and Strategy (DCNO N3/N5), 2005–2008.	3	1972 (NROTC)	33	(1950– )
*	Patrick M. Walsh		3 Nov 2005	Commander, U.S. Naval Forces Central Command/Commander, U.S. Fifth Fleet/Commander, Combined Maritime Forces (COMUSNAVCENT/COMFIFTHFLT/COMCMF), 2005–2007.	2	1977 (USNA)	28	(1955– ) Promoted to admiral, 5 Apr 2007.
*	John C. Harvey Jr.		22 Nov 2005	Deputy Chief of Naval Operations, Manpower, Personnel, Training and Education/Chief of Naval Personnel (DCNO N1/CNP), 2005.; Deputy Chief of Naval Operations, Total Force/Chief of Naval Personnel (DCNO N1/CNP), 2005–2008.; Director, Navy Staff (DNS/N09B), 2008–2009.	4	1973 (USNA)	32	(1951– ) Promoted to admiral, 24 Jul 2009. Virginia Secretary of Veterans and Defense Affairs, 2014–2017.
50	Robert T. Conway Jr.		14 Mar 2006	Commander, Navy Installations Command (CNIC), 2006–2009.	3	1972 (OCS)	34	(1950– )
51	Mark J. Edwards		16 Jun 2006	Deputy Chief of Naval Operations, Communication Networks (DCNO N6), 2006–2008.	2	1972 (NROTC)	34	(1950– )
52	Robert B. Murrett		7 Jul 2006	Director, National Geospatial-Intelligence Agency (DIRNGA), 2006–2010.	4	1975 (NROTC)	31	(1952– ) Director of Naval Intelligence, 2005–2006; Deputy Director, Institute for Security Policy and Law, 2011–present.
53	Nancy E. Brown		Aug 2006	Director, Command, Control, Communications and Computer Systems, Joint Staff, J6, 2006–2009.	3	1974 (OCS)	32	(1952– ) Deputy Director, White House Military Office, 1999–2000.
54	William D. Crowder		12 Sep 2006	Commander, U.S. Seventh Fleet (COMSEVENTHFLT), 2006–2008.; Deputy Chief of Naval Operations, Information, Plans and Strategy (DCNO N3/N5), 2008.; Deputy Chief of Naval Operations, Operations, Plans and Strategy (DCNO N3/N5), 2008–2009.	3	1974 (USNA)	28	(1952– )
55	P. Stephen Stanley		6 Dec 2006	Director, Force Structure, Resources and Assessment, Joint Staff, J8, 2006–2010.; Principal Deputy Director, Cost Assessment and Program Evaluation, Office of the Secretary of Defense, 2010–2012.	6	1975 (USNA)	31	(1952– )
56	Melvin G. Williams Jr.		1 Jan 2007	Deputy Commander, U.S. Fleet Forces Command (DCOMUSFF), 2007–2008.; Commander, U.S. Second Fleet/Director, Combined Joint Operations from the Sea Center of Excellence (COMSECONDFLT/DIRCJOS COE), 2008–2010.	3	1978 (USNA)	28	(1955– ) U.S. Associate Deputy Secretary of Energy, 2011–2013.
57	Michael K. Loose		31 Jan 2007	Deputy Chief of Naval Operations, Fleet Readiness and Logistics (DCNO N4), 2007–2010.	3	1975 (NROTC)	32	(1953– ) Civil Engineer Corps.
58	John J. Donnelly		3 Feb 2007	Commander, Submarine Forces/Commander, Submarine Force Atlantic/Commander, Allied Submarine Command/Commander, Task Force 46/Commander, Task Force 82/Commander, Task Force 144/Commander, Task Force 84 (COMSUBFOR/COMSUBLANT/COMASC/CTF-46/CTF-82/CTF-144/CTF-84), 2007–2010.	3	1975 (USNA)	32	(1952– )
59	David J. Venlet		16 Feb 2007	Commander, Naval Air Systems Command (COMNAVAIR), 2007–2010.; Program Executive Officer, F-35 Lightning II Joint Program Office (PEO F-35), 2010–2012.	5	1974 (USNA)	33	(1954– )
*	Samuel J. Locklear III		3 May 2007	Commander, U.S. Third Fleet (COMTHIRDFLT), 2007–2009.; Director, Navy Staff (DNS/N09B), 2009–2010.	3	1977 (USNA)	30	(1954– ) Promoted to admiral, 6 Oct 2010.
60	Jeffrey L. Fowler		8 Jun 2007	Superintendent, U.S. Naval Academy, 2007–2010.	3	1978 (USNA)	29	(1956– ) Resigned, 2010.
61	H. Denby Starling II		15 Jun 2007	Commander, Naval Network Warfare Command/Deputy Department of the Navy Chief Information Officer (Navy)/Assistant Chief of Naval Operations, Information Technology (COMNAVNETWARCOM/DCHINFO(N)/ACNO-IT), 2007–2008.; Commander, Naval Network Warfare Command (COMNAVNETWARCOM), 2008–2010.; Commander, Navy Cyber Forces/Commander, Naval Network Warfare Command (COMCYBERFOR/COMNAVNETWARCOM), 2010.	3	1974 (NROTC)	33	(1952– )
62	Thomas J. Kilcline Jr.		22 Jun 2007	Commander, Naval Air Forces/Commander, Naval Air Force, U.S. Pacific Fleet (COMNAVAIRFOR/COMNAVAIRPAC), 2007–2010.	3	1973 (USNA)	34	(1951– )
63	Joseph Maguire		28 Jun 2007	Deputy Director, Strategic Operational Planning, National Counterterrorism Center, 2007–2010.	3	1974 (NROTC)	33	(1951– ) Navy SEAL. Director, National Counterterrorism Center, 2018–2019.
64	David Architzel		1 Aug 2007	Principal Military Deputy to the Assistant Secretary of the Navy (Research, Development, and Acquisition) (PMD ASN(RDA)), 2007–2010.; Commander, Naval Air Systems Command (COMNAVAIR), 2010–2012.	5	1973 (USNA)	34	(1951– )
65	Adam M. Robinson Jr.		27 Aug 2007	Surgeon General, U.S. Navy/Chief, Bureau of Medicine and Surgery (SGN/BUMED), 2007–2011.	4	1977 (direct) (Note: Directly commissioned via the Armed Forces Health Professions Scholarship Program (HPSP).)	30	(1950– ) Medical Corps. Director, Veterans Affairs Maryland Health Care System, 2015–2020; Director, Veterans Affairs Pacific Islands Health Care System, 2020–present.
66	Jeffrey A. Wieringa		29 Aug 2007	Director, Defense Security Cooperation Agency (DIRDSCA), 2007–2010.	3	1976 (AOCS)	31	(1955– )
*	James A. Winnefeld Jr.		14 Sep 2007	Commander, U.S. Sixth Fleet/Commander, Allied Joint Force Command Lisbon/Commander, Naval Striking and Support Forces NATO/Deputy Commander, U.S. Naval Forces Europe/Joint Force Maritime Component Commander Europe (COMSIXTHFLT/COMJC Lisbon/COMSTRIKFOR- NATO/DCOMUSNAVEUR/JFMCC Europe), 2007–2008.; Commander, U.S. Sixth Fleet/Commander, Allied Joint Force Command Lisbon/Commander, Naval Striking and Support Forces NATO/Deputy Commander, U.S. Naval Forces Europe/Deputy Commander, U.S. Naval Forces Africa/Joint Force Maritime Component Commander Europe (COMSIXTHFLT/COMJC Lisbon/COMSTRIKFORNATO/DCOMUS- NAVEUR/DCOMUSNAVAF/JFMCC Europe), 2008.; Director, Strategic Plans and Policy, Joint Staff, J5/Senior Member, U.S. Delegation to the U.N. Military Staff Committee (Sr. Member MSC), 2008–2010.	3	1978 (NROTC)	29	(1956– ) (Note: Served as Vice Chairman, Joint Chiefs of Staff (VJCS).) Promoted to admiral, 19 May 2010. Chair, President's Intelligence Advisory Board, 2022–2024.
67	Richard K. Gallagher		1 Oct 2007	Deputy Commander, U.S. European Command (DCDRUSEUCOM), 2007–2009.; U.S. Military Representative, NATO Military Committee (USMILREP), 2009–2012.	5	1976 (USNA)	31	(1952– )
68	Robert T. Moeller		10 Oct 2007	Deputy to the Commander for Military Operations, U.S. Africa Command, 2007–2010.	3	1974 (NROTC)	33	(1951–2011)
69	William D. Sullivan		11 Oct 2007	U.S. Military Representative, NATO Military Committee (USMILREP), 2007–2009.	2	1972 (OCS)	35	(1950– )
70	Carl V. Mauney		15 Oct 2007	Deputy Commander, U.S. Strategic Command (DCDRUSSTRATCOM), 2007–2010.	3	1975 (NROTC)	32	(1953– )
71	Bernard J. McCullough III		1 Nov 2007	Deputy Chief of Naval Operations, Integration of Capabilities and Resources (DCNO N8), 2007–2009.; Commander, U.S. Fleet Cyber Command/Commander, U.S. Tenth Fleet (COMFCC/COMTENTHFLT), 2009–2011.	4	1975 (USNA)	32	(1953– )
72	Anthony L. Winns		9 Nov 2007	Naval Inspector General (NAVIG), 2007–2011.	4	1978 (USNA)	30	(1956– )
73	Derwood C. Curtis		13 Mar 2008	Commander, Naval Surface Forces/Commander, Naval Surface Force, U.S. Pacific Fleet (COMNAVSURFOR/COMNAVSURFPAC), 2008–2011.	3	1976 (USNA)	32	(1953– )
*	Mark E. Ferguson III		16 Apr 2008	Deputy Chief of Naval Operations, Manpower, Personnel, Training and Education/Chief of Naval Personnel (DCNO N1/CNP), 2008–2011.	3	1978 (USNA)	30	(1956– ) Promoted to admiral, 22 Aug 2011.
74	David J. Dorsett		4 Jun 2008	Director of Naval Intelligence (OPNAV N2/DNI), 2008–2009.; Deputy Chief of Naval Operations, Information Dominance/Director of Naval Intelligence (DCNO N2/N6/DNI), 2009–2011.	3	1978 (NROTC)	30	(1956– )
*	William H. McRaven		13 Jun 2008	Commander, Joint Special Operations Command/Commander, Joint Special Operations Command Forward, U.S. Special Operations Command (CDRJSOC/CDRJSOC-F), 2008–2011.	3	1977 (NROTC)	31	(1955– ) Navy SEAL. Promoted to admiral, 8 Aug 2011. Chancellor, University of Texas System, 2015–2018.
*	Harry B. Harris Jr.		13 Jun 2008	Deputy Chief of Naval Operations, Communication Networks/Deputy Department of the Navy Chief Information Officer (Navy) (DCNO N6/DCHINFO(N)), 2008–2009.; Commander, U.S. Sixth Fleet/Commander, Naval Striking and Support Forces NATO/Deputy Commander, U.S. Naval Forces Europe/Deputy Commander, U.S. Naval Forces Africa/Joint Force Maritime Component Commander Europe (COMSIXTHFLT/COMSTRIKFORNATO/DCOMUS- NAVEUR/DCOMUSNAVAF/JFMCC Europe), 2009–2011.; Assistant to the Chairman of the Joint Chiefs of Staff (ACJCS), 2011–2013.	5	1978 (USNA)	30	(1956– ) Promoted to admiral, 16 Oct 2013. U.S. Ambassador to South Korea, 2018–2021.
*	William E. Gortney		5 Jul 2008	Commander, U.S. Naval Forces Central Command/Commander, U.S. Fifth Fleet/Commander, Combined Maritime Forces (COMUSNAVCENT/COMFIFTHFLT/COMCMF), 2008–2010.; Director, Joint Staff (DJS), 2010–2012.	4	1977 (AOCS)	31	(1955– ) Promoted to admiral, 14 Sep 2012.
75	John M. Bird		12 Jul 2008	Commander, U.S. Seventh Fleet (COMSEVENTHFLT), 2008–2010.; Director, Navy Staff (DNS/N09B), 2010–2012.	4	1977 (USNA)	31	(1955– )
76	Dirk J. Debbink		22 Jul 2008	Chief, U.S. Navy Reserve/Commander, Navy Reserve Force (CNR/CNRF), 2008–2012.	4	1977 (USNA)	31	(1955– )
77	Peter H. Daly		Aug 2008	Deputy Commander, U.S. Fleet Forces Command (DCOMUSFF), 2008–2011.	3	1977 (NROTC)	31	(1955– ) CEO, U.S. Naval Institute, 2011–2023.
78	Bruce E. MacDonald		4 Aug 2008	Judge Advocate General, U.S. Navy/U.S. Department of Defense Representative for Ocean Policy Affairs (JAG/REPOPA), 2006–2009.	1	1978 (NROTC)	30	(1955– ) Judge Advocate General's Corps. Convening Authority, Office of Military Commissions, 2010–2013. First three-star judge advocate general of the Navy.
79	Kevin M. McCoy		8 Aug 2008	Commander, Naval Sea Systems Command (COMNAVSEA), 2008–2013.	5	1978 (NROTC)	30	(1956– )
*	Bruce W. Clingan		27 Aug 2008	Commander, U.S. Sixth Fleet/Commander, Allied Joint Force Command Lisbon/Commander, Naval Striking and Support Forces NATO/Deputy Commander, U.S. Naval Forces Europe/Deputy Commander, U.S. Naval Forces Africa/Joint Force Maritime Component Commander Europe (COMSIXTHFLT/COMJC Lisbon/COMSTRIKFORNATO/DCOMUSNAVEUR/DCOM- USNAVAF/JFMCC Europe), 2008–2009.; Commander, U.S. Sixth Fleet/Commander, Naval Striking and Support Forces NATO/Deputy Commander, U.S. Naval Forces Europe/Deputy Commander, U.S. Naval Forces Africa/Joint Force Maritime Component Commander Europe (COMSIXTHFLT/COMSTRIKFORNATO/DCOMUSNAV- EUR/DCOMUSNAVAF/JFMCC Europe), 2009.; Deputy Chief of Naval Operations, Operations, Plans, and Strategy (DCNO N3/N5), 2009–2012.	4	1977 (NROTC)	31	(1955– ) Promoted to admiral, 24 Feb 2012.
80	Robert S. Harward Jr.		3 Nov 2008	Deputy Commander, U.S. Joint Forces Command (DCDRUSJFCOM), 2008–2009.; Commander, Combined Joint Interagency Task Force 435 (CDRCJIATF 435), 2009–2011.; Deputy Commander, U.S. Central Command (DCDRUSCENTCOM), 2011–2013.	5	1979 (USNA)	29	(1956– ) Navy SEAL.
81	Alan S. Thompson		19 Nov 2008	Director, Defense Logistics Agency (DIRDLA), 2008–2011.	3	1976 (NROTC)	32	(1954– )
82	John M. Mateczun		8 Dec 2008	Commander, Joint Task Force National Capital Region Medical (JTF CapMed Commander), 2007–2012.	4	1973 (direct)	35	(1947– )
83	Michael C. Vitale		30 Jan 2009	Commander, Navy Installations Command (CNIC), 2009–2012.	3	1977 (NROTC)	32	(1955– )
84	Joseph D. Kernan		Jun 2009	Senior Military Assistant to the Secretary of Defense (SMA SecDef), 2009–2011.; Military Deputy Commander, U.S. Southern Command (MILDEPUSSOUTHCOM), 2011–2013.	4	1977 (USNA)	32	(1955– ) U.S. Under Secretary of Defense for Intelligence, 2017–2020.
85	Richard W. Hunt		13 Jun 2009	Commander, U.S. Third Fleet (COMTHIRDFLT), 2009–2011.; Commander, Naval Surface Forces/Commander, Naval Surface Force, U.S. Pacific Fleet (COMNAVSURFOR/COMNAVSURFPAC), 2011–2012.; Director, Navy Staff (DNS), 2012–2013.	4	1976 (OCS)	33	(1953– )
86	James W. Houck		14 Aug 2009	Judge Advocate General, U.S. Navy/U.S. Department of Defense Representative for Ocean Policy Affairs (JAG/REPOPA), 2009–2012.	3	1980 (USNA)	29	(1958– ) Judge Advocate General's Corps. Interim Dean, Penn State Law and School of International Affairs, 2021–2024.
87	Mark D. Harnitchek		12 Nov 2009	Deputy Commander, U.S. Transportation Command (DCDRUSTRANSCOM), 2009–2011.; Director, Defense Logistics Agency (DIRDLA), 2011–2014.	5	1977 (NROTC)	32	(1955– ) Supply Corps.

== Background ==
=== Three-star positions, elevations and reductions ===
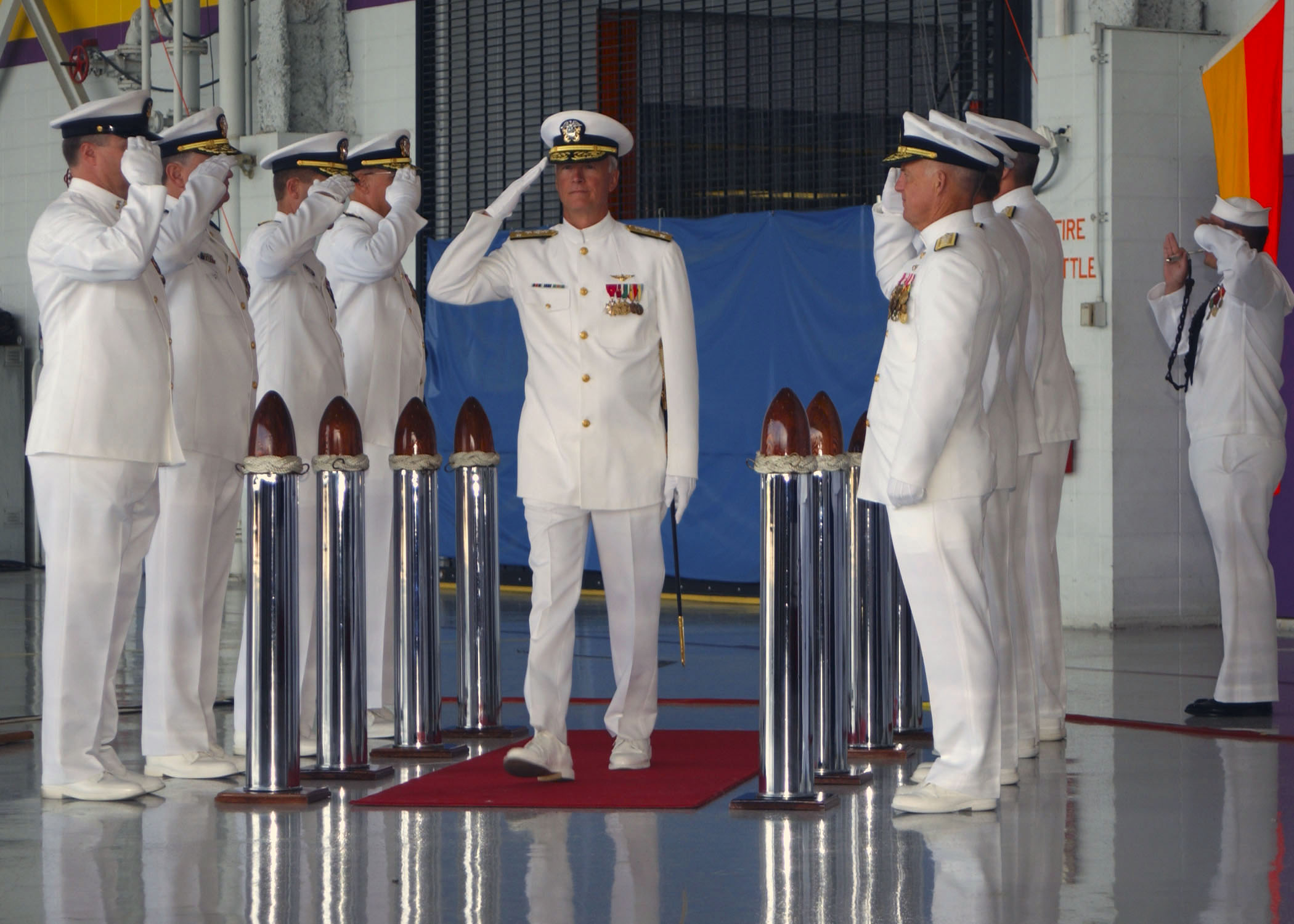
Vice Adm. John B. Totushek passes through the sideboys at the U.S. Navy Reserve change of command ceremony on 18 October 2003.

The directorates of the Office of the Chief of Naval Operations underwent significant restructuring between 2000 and 2009.

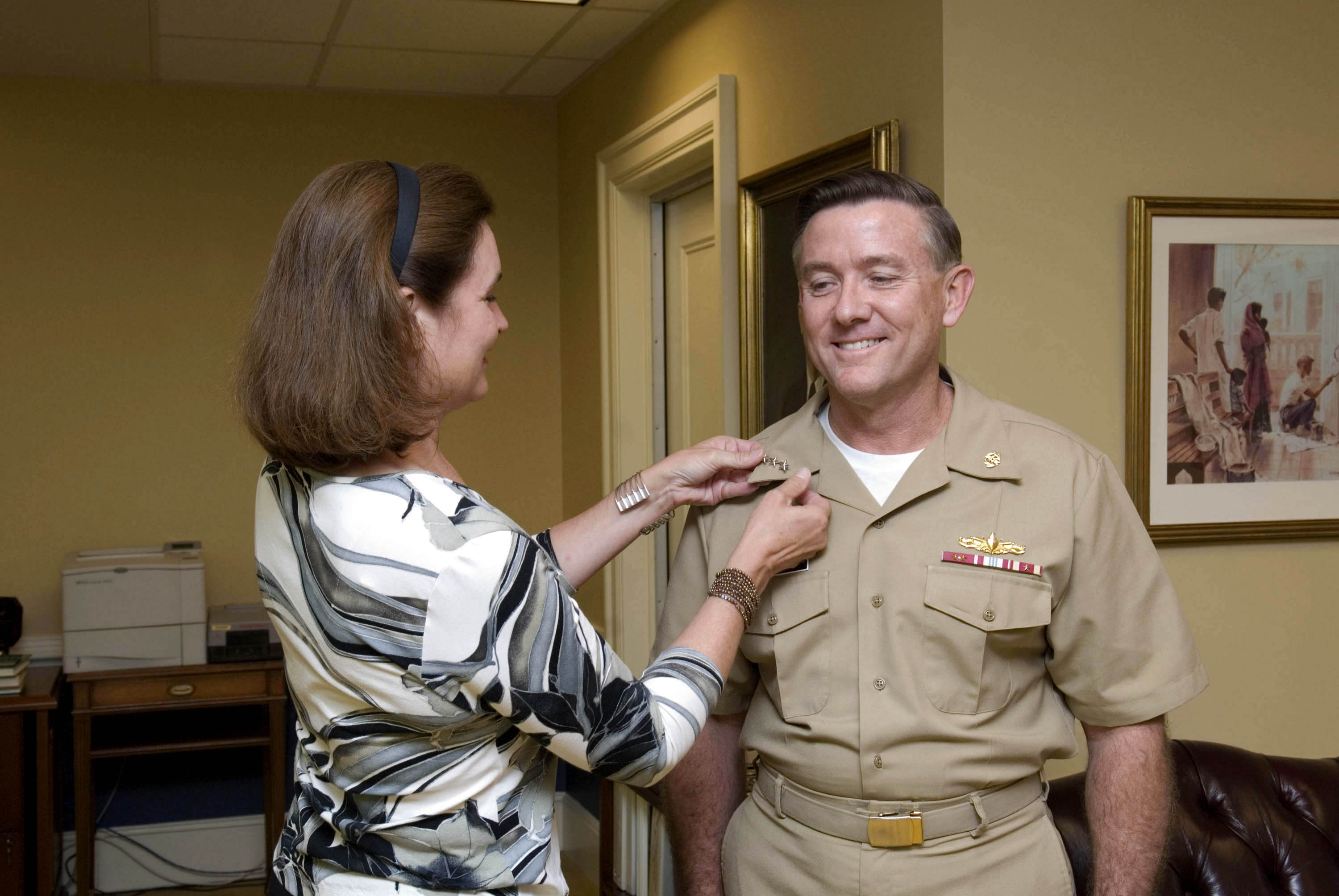
Vice Adm. Bruce E. MacDonald is pinned with his new rank by his wife, Karen, on 4 August 2008.

- The N4 (Fleet Readiness and Logistics) and N7 (Warfare Requirements and Programs) directorates were stood up in 2000 under CNO Vern Clark as advocates for current and future fleet requirements respectively. The heads of both directorates were three-star vice admirals.
- The director of naval intelligence became a permanent three-star billet in 2009 under CNO Gary Roughead with the consolidation of the N2 and N6 directorates into the N2/N6 (Information Dominance) directorate under a deputy chief of naval operations dual-hatted as DNI. Consequently, then-DNI Vice Admiral David J. Dorsett was reconfirmed as a vice admiral in October 2009 to assume the dual hat.

Two positions directly responsible to the Chief of Naval Operations were elevated to three-star grade between 2000 and 2009.

- The Floyd D. Spence National Defense Authorization Act for Fiscal Year 2001 elevated the leaders of all service reserve and National Guard components to three-star grade under standard promotion authority. (Note: Special promotion authority to three-star rank for service reserve and National Guard leaders had existed since 1999 under 10 U.S.C. § 12505; the 2001 NDAA repealed this section and assigned the affected positions with statutory three-star grades under standard promotion authority.) As such, the incumbent chief of Navy Reserve, Rear Admiral John B. Totushek was nominated for promotion to vice admiral, and assumed the rank in June 2001.
- The National Defense Authorization Act for Fiscal Year 2008 elevated all judge advocates general of the service branches to three-star grade. Rear Admiral Bruce E. MacDonald, the incumbent judge advocate general of the Navy, was nominated for promotion to vice admiral in July 2008, and assumed the rank in August of the same year.

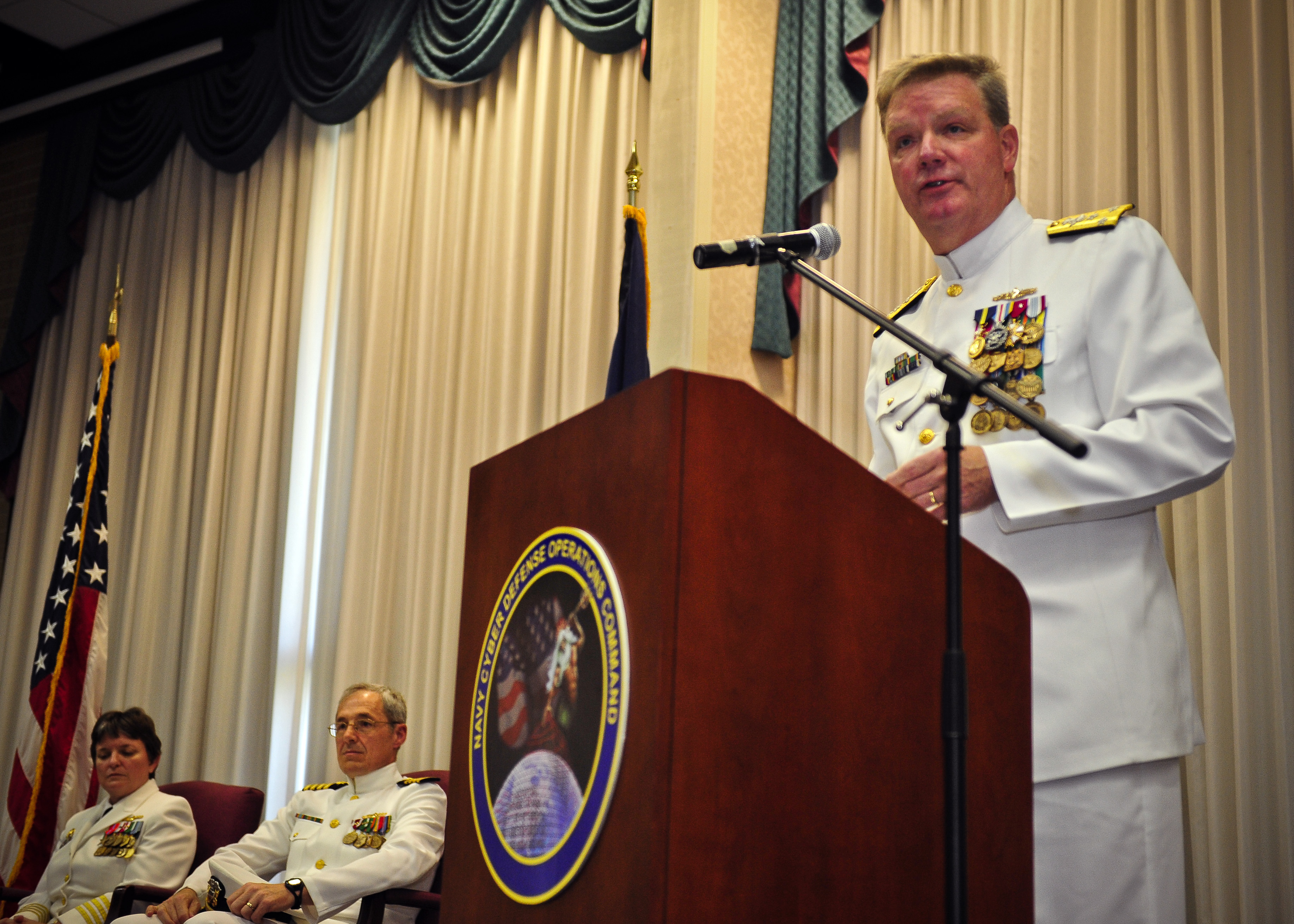
Vice Adm. Bernard J. McCullough III at a change of command ceremony, 27 July 2011.

A number of Navy commands were established, elevated to or downgraded from three-star level between 2000 and 2009.

- Navy Installations Command was established in October 2003 as a rear admiral's billet, but was elevated to a vice admiral's billet in 2006 concurrent with the downgrading of Military Sealift Command into a two-star command.
- The commander of Military Sealift Command, charged with replenishment and transport operations for the Navy, was reduced to a rear admiral's billet in 2006. Vice Admiral David L. Brewer III thus became the last vice admiral to lead MSC.
- U.S. Fleet Cyber Command and Tenth Fleet were established in late 2009 as a dual-hatted vice admiral's billet. Vice Admiral Bernard J. McCullough III, then-deputy chief of naval operations for integration of capabilities and resources (DCNO N8), was confirmed to the new position in December 2009.

Additionally, on 1 October 2001, a single type commander was designated as the "follow-on" lead for a type of weapon system for the overall operating forces of the Navy, leading several Pacific and Atlantic type commanders to be dual-hatted as overall type commanders for the entire service. The aviation, submarine and surface warfare type commanders, Vice Admirals John B. Nathman, John J. Grossenbacher, Timothy W. LaFleur assumed their dual hats on the same date.

=== Senate confirmations ===
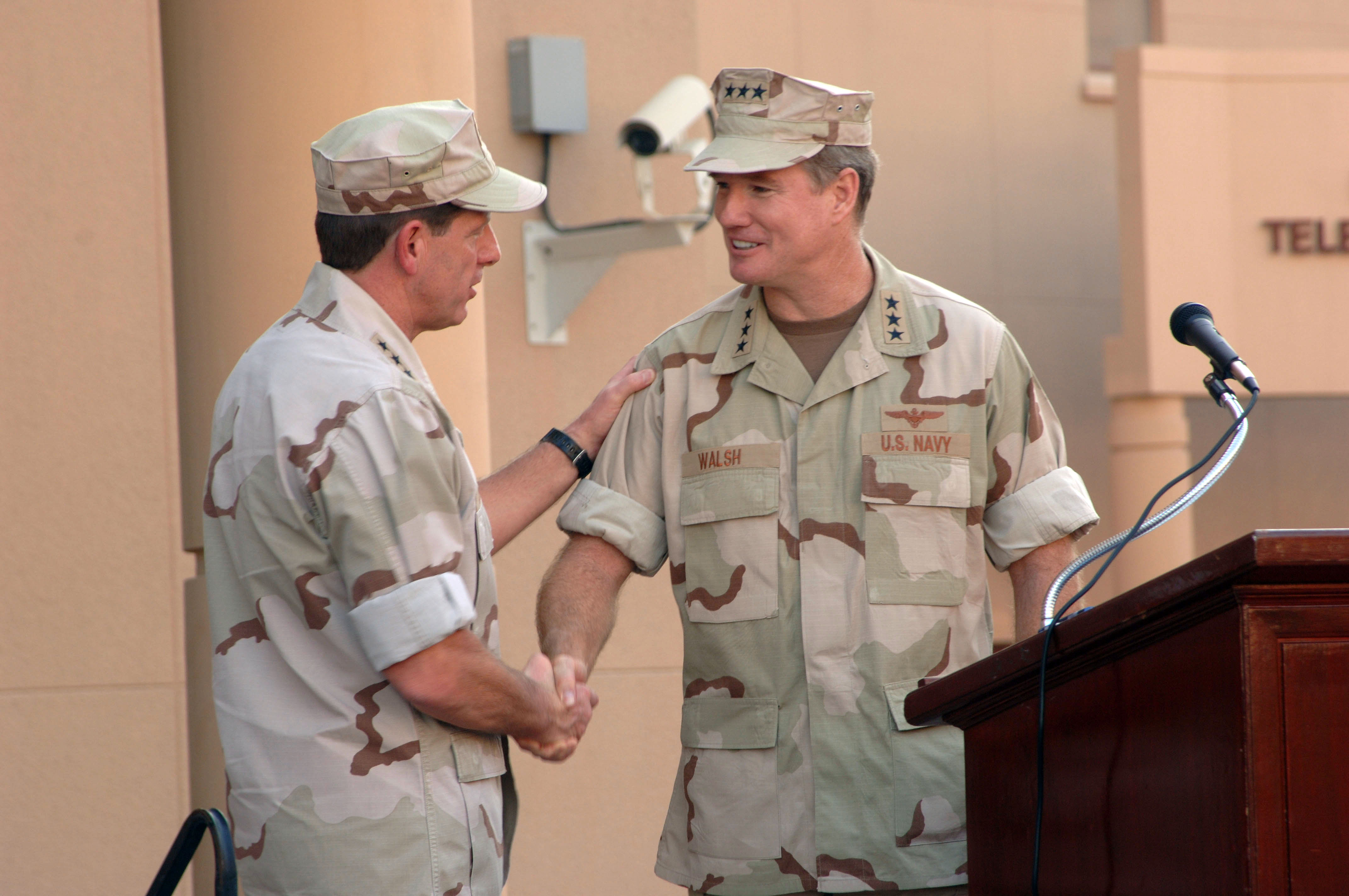
Vice Adm. David C. Nichols relieves Vice Adm. Patrick M. Walsh as commander of U.S. Naval Forces Central Command in Bahrain, 3 November 2005.

Military nominations are considered by the Senate Armed Services Committee. While it is rare for three-star or four-star nominations to face even token opposition in the Senate, nominations that do face opposition due to controversy surrounding the nominee in question are typically withdrawn. Nominations that are not withdrawn are allowed to expire without action at the end of the legislative session.

- The nomination of Rear Admiral Elizabeth A. Hight to be director of the Defense Information Systems Agency in 2008 was withdrawn due to concerns about a possible conflict of interest with her husband, a retired Air Force general who was employed by a prominent Defense contractor.
- The nomination of Major General Joseph J. Taluto to succeed Clyde A. Vaughn as director of the Army National Guard in 2010 was withdrawn due to public controversy and subsequent Senate inaction over his handling of the deaths of Phillip Esposito and Louis Allen.

Additionally, events that take place after Senate confirmation may still delay or even prevent the nominee from assuming office.

- For example, Major General John G. Rossi, who had been confirmed for promotion to lieutenant general and assignment as the commanding general of the U.S. Army Space and Missile Defense Command in April 2016 committed suicide two days before his scheduled promotion and assumption of command. As a result, the then incumbent commander of USASMDC, Lieutenant General David L. Mann, remained in command beyond statutory term limits until another nominee, Major General James H. Dickinson was confirmed by the Senate.
- Vice Admiral Scott A. Stearney assumed command of U.S. Naval Forces Central Command, Fifth Fleet, and Combined Maritime Forces in May 2018. His death in December of the same year resulted in the speedy confirmation of Rear Admiral James J. Malloy in the same month for appointment to three-star rank as his replacement.

== Legislative history ==
The following list of Congressional legislation includes all acts of Congress pertaining to appointments to the grade of vice admiral in the United States Navy from 2000 to 2009. (Note: Legislative history compiled from the U.S. Congress official website and U.S. Government Publishing Office official website.)

Each entry lists an act of Congress, its citation in the United States Statutes at Large, and a summary of the act's relevance, with officers affected by the act bracketed where applicable. Positions listed without reference to rank are assumed to be eligible for officers of three-star grade or higher.

List of legislation on appointments of vice admirals from 2000 to 2009
Legislation	Citation	Summary
Act of October 30, 2000 [Floyd D. Spence National Defense Authorization Act for Fiscal Year 2001]	114 Stat. 1654A–103; 114 Stat. 1654A–105	Raised statutory rank of the chief of Naval Reserve, under standard promotion procedures, to vice admiral (John B. Totushek).; Repealed special requirement for senior reserve component officers, (Note: referring to the chiefs of service reserve components (Army Reserve, Marine Forces Reserve, Naval Reserve, and Air Force Reserve) and directors of the Army and Air National Guard) per Section 12505 of Title 10, for appointment to grade of lieutenant general or vice admiral.
Act of December 2, 2002 [Bob Stump National Defense Authorization Act for Fiscal Year 2003]	116 Stat. 2487; 116 Stat. 2525	Established a Department of Defense Test Resource Management Center and assigned director statutory grade of lieutenant general or vice admiral.; Exempted the senior military assistant to the secretary of defense from number and percentage limitations on general or flag officers, if serving in grade of lieutenant general or vice admiral.
Act of October 28, 2004 [Ronald W. Reagan National Defense Authorization Act for Fiscal Year 2005]	118 Stat. 1875	Removed requirement for deputy and assistant chiefs of naval operations to be selected from line officers of the Navy.
Act of January 6, 2006 [National Defense Authorization Act for Fiscal Year 2006]	119 Stat. 3226	Prohibited frocking of officers below grade of major general or rear admiral to grades above major general or rear admiral.
Act of January 28, 2008 [National Defense Authorization Act for Fiscal Year 2008]	122 Stat. 94; 122 Stat. 115; 122 Stat. 278	Raised statutory rank of the judge advocate general of the Navy to vice admiral (Bruce E. MacDonald).; Increased percentage of general or flag officers that may be appointed above grade of major general or rear admiral from 15.7% to 16.3%.; Allowed officers serving in grade of lieutenant general, general, vice admiral, or admiral to continue holding such position for up to 60 days following reassignment from such position, unless placed sooner in another designated position.; Made position of principal military deputy to the assistant secretary of the Navy (research, development and acquisition) statutory, to be selected from active duty vice admirals of the Navy and lieutenant generals of the Marine Corps.
Act of October 14, 2008 [Duncan Hunter National Defense Authorization Act for Fiscal Year 2009]	122 Stat. 4433; 122 Stat. 4435; 122 Stat. 4436	Increased percentage of flag officers in the Navy that may be appointed above grade of rear admiral from 16.3% to 16.4%.; Revised cap on total number of authorized Navy flag officers to be reduced to 160, of which 32 may be appointed in grade of vice admiral pending a congressional report by the secretary of defense.; Authorized appointment of up to 68 officers in grade of lieutenant general or vice admiral for joint duty assignments.
Act of October 28, 2009 [National Defense Authorization Act for Fiscal Year 2010]	123 Stat. 2273	Capped total number of Navy flag officers who may be appointed in grade of vice admiral at 32, pursuant to changes made under NDAA 2009.

== See also ==
- List of active duty United States four-star officers
- List of active duty United States three-star officers
- List of United States Navy vice admirals on active duty before 1960
- List of United States Navy vice admirals from 2010 to 2019
- List of United States Navy vice admirals since 2020
- List of United States Coast Guard vice admirals
- List of United States Public Health Service Commissioned Corps vice admirals
- List of United States military leaders by rank
- List of United States Navy four-star admirals
- Vice admiral (United States)

== Bibliography ==
- Register of Commissioned and Warrant Officers of the United States Navy on Active Duty, Washington, D.C.: Bureau of Naval Personnel, 1 October 1990
- Swartz, Peter; Markowitz, Michael (31 December 2009), Organizing OPNAV (1970 - 2009) (PDF), U.S. Naval History and Heritage Command, archived (PDF) from the original on 25 December 2021
- U.S. Naval Forces Europe/U.S. SIXTH Fleet, Chronology of Commanders, archived from the original on 6 January 2008
- United States Navy Biographies, U.S. Navy Chief Information Officer, archived from the original on 5 December 2003
