= James A. Winnefeld =

James A. Winnefeld may refer to:

- James A. Winnefeld Sr. (1929–2015), American navy rear admiral
- James A. Winnefeld Jr. (born 1956), American navy admiral
