= James A. Winnefeld Jr. =

American defense official (born 1956)

Sandy Winnefeld
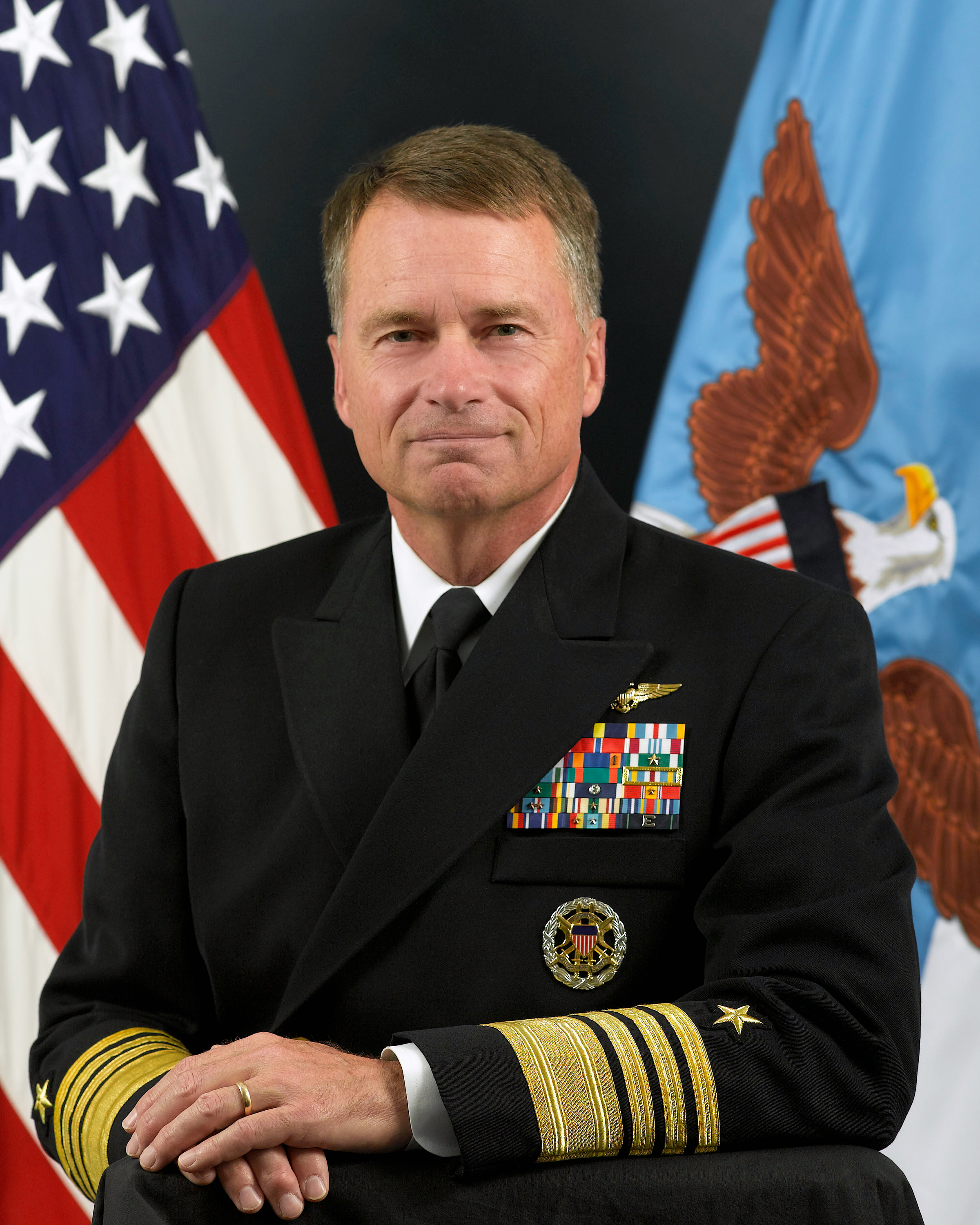
- Official portrait, 2011

Chair of the President's Intelligence Advisory Board
- In office May 4, 2022 – January 20, 2025
- President: Joe Biden
- Preceded by: Steve Feinberg
- Succeeded by: Devin Nunes

Vice Chairman of the Joint Chiefs of Staff
- In office August 4, 2011 – July 31, 2015
- President: Barack Obama
- Preceded by: James Cartwright
- Succeeded by: Paul J. Selva

Personal details
- Born: James Alexander Winnefeld Jr. April 24, 1956 (age 70) Coronado, California, U.S.
- Relatives: James A. Winnefeld Sr. (father)
- Education: Georgia Institute of Technology (BS)

Military service
- Allegiance: United States
- Branch/service: United States Navy
- Years of service: 1978–2015
- Rank: Admiral
- Commands: Vice Chairman of the Joint Chiefs of Staff; United States Northern Command; North American Aerospace Defense Command; United States Sixth Fleet; Carrier Strike Group Two; USS Enterprise (CVN-65); USS Cleveland (LPD-7); VF-211
- Battles/wars: Operation Desert Shield; Gulf War; War in Afghanistan; Iraq War
- Awards: Defense Distinguished Service Medal (3); Navy Distinguished Service Medal; Defense Superior Service Medal; Legion of Merit (2); Bronze Star Medal; Meritorious Service Cross (Canada)

James Alexander "Sandy" Winnefeld Jr. (born April 24, 1956) is a retired United States Navy admiral who served as the chair of the President's Intelligence Advisory Board. While on active duty, Winnefeld served as the ninth vice chairman of the Joint Chiefs of Staff from August 4, 2011, to July 31, 2015.

He previously served as the fourth commander of U.S. Northern Command (USNORTHCOM) and the 21st commander of North American Aerospace Defense Command (NORAD) from May 19, 2010, to August 3, 2011.

Prior to that, Winnefeld served as Director for Strategic Plans and Policy, Joint Staff which he concurrently served as the Senior Member, U.S. Delegation to the U.N. Military Staff Committee. His other operational commands include serving as the commander of U.S. Sixth Fleet and commander of Allied Joint Command Lisbon.

As the vice chairman of the Joint Chiefs of Staff, Winnefeld was the second highest-ranking officer in the United States Armed Forces, second only to the chairman of the Joint Chiefs of Staff. In 2015, he retired from the Navy after over 37 years of service. He currently serves on the board of directors for Raytheon Technologies, one of the largest aerospace and defense companies in the world.

== Biography ==
Winnefeld's military lineage extended to his father and grandfather who both served in the Navy. His great-grandfather was a Prussian cavalryman.

Winnefeld graduated from Georgia Tech in 1978 with high honors in Aerospace Engineering and received his commission via the Navy Reserve Officer Training Corps program.

While at Georgia Tech, he was a member of the Pi Kappa Alpha fraternity. After designation as a naval aviator, he served with two fighter squadrons and as an instructor at the Navy Fighter Weapons School (TOPGUN). While an instructor at TOPGUN, he worked with crew from Paramount Pictures on the production of the movie Top Gun. Winnefeld went on to graduate with the highest distinction from the U.S. Naval War College off-campus program. He is a recipient of the Admiral William J. Crowe Award as Joint Staff Action Officer of the Year and the Vice Admiral William W. Behrens Jr. award as the honor graduate of his class at Nuclear Power School.

His command tours include Fighter Squadron 211 (VF-211), USS Cleveland (LPD-7) and as the 17th commanding officer of the USS Enterprise (CVN-65). He led Enterprise through her 18th deployment, which included combat operations in Afghanistan in support of Operation Enduring Freedom immediately after the terrorist acts of September 11, 2001. As commander, Carrier Strike Group 2/Theodore Roosevelt Carrier Strike Group, he led Task Forces 50, 152 and 58 in support of Operation Iraqi Freedom and maritime interception operations in the Persian Gulf. He most recently served concurrently as Commander, U.S. Sixth Fleet; Commander, Allied Joint Command Lisbon; Commander, Striking and Support Forces NATO; Deputy Commander, U.S. Naval Forces Europe; and Joint Forces Maritime Component Commander, Europe.

His shore tours include service as an action officer in the Joint Staff Operations Directorate, as senior aide to the chairman of the Joint Chiefs of Staff and as executive assistant to the vice chief of naval operations. As a flag officer he served ashore as Director, Warfare Programs and Transformational Concepts, U.S. Fleet Forces Command and as Director, Joint Innovation and Experimentation at U.S. Joint Forces Command.

Winnefeld is now a Distinguished Professor at the Sam Nunn School of International Affairs at Georgia Tech. He is also a non-resident senior fellow at the Belfer Center at the Harvard Kennedy School.

Winnefeld began speaking out on his son's opioid overdose death and advocating for awareness of the opioid epidemic.

In an April 5, 2020 phone call to White House Chief of Staff Mark Meadows, Senate Minority Leader Chuck Schumer touted Winnefeld as a potential COVID-19 czar to oversee the production and disbursement of medical equipment.

In May 2022, Winnefeld was appointed to serve as chair of the President's Intelligence Advisory Board.

== September 11 attacks ==
Winnefeld was the commanding officer of the USS Enterprise during the September 11 attacks. The Enterprise was headed to Cape Town, South Africa, for a port call. The crew was watching television at sea on September 11 and watched the hijacked United Airlines Flight 175 airliner strike the south tower of the World Trade Center. Acting without specific direction from the National Command Authority, then-Captain Winnefeld gave the order to put the ship's rudder over (180° degree turn) to take station in the Arabian Sea.

The carrier's aircraft were within range of Afghanistan the next morning. For over three weeks starting on October 7, aircraft from Enterprise flew nearly 700 missions and dropped large amounts of ordnance over Afghanistan. The Chief of Naval Operations, Admiral Vern Clark praised Winnefeld and credited him for taking initiative as well as for the Enterprise's crew readiness.

== Dates of rank ==
Ensign	Lieutenant (junior grade)	Lieutenant	Lieutenant Commander	Commander	Captain
O-1	O-2	O-3	O-4	O-5	O-6
June 7, 1978	June 7, 1980	July 1, 1982	September 1, 1988	September 1, 1992	September 1, 1997

Rear Admiral (lower half)	Rear Admiral	Vice Admiral	Admiral
O-7	O-8	O-9	O-10
October 1, 2003	May 6, 2006	September 14, 2007	May 19, 2010

== Military awards and decorations ==

Naval Aviator insignia
Defense Distinguished Service Medal with two bronze oak leaf clusters | Navy Distinguished Service Medal
Defense Superior Service Medal	Legion of Merit with one star	Bronze Star
Defense Meritorious Service Medal	Meritorious Service Medal	Air Medal with Strike/Flight numeral "1"
Navy Commendation Medal	Joint Service Achievement Medal	Navy and Marine Corps Achievement Medal
Joint Meritorious Unit Award with cluster	Navy Unit Commendation with one star	Navy E Ribbon with wreathed Battle "E" Device
National Defense Service Medal with one star	Armed Forces Expeditionary Medal with two stars	Southwest Asia Service Medal with one star
Global War on Terrorism Expeditionary Medal	Global War on Terrorism Service Medal	Sea Service Deployment Ribbon with six stars
Meritorious Service Cross; Military Division (Canada)	French National Order of Merit, Commander	Pistol Marksmanship Medal with Expert Marksmanship Device
Office of the Joint Chiefs of Staff Identification Badge

He is also a recipient of the William J. Crowe, William W. Behrens Jr. awards and the 2012 recipient of the Naval War College Distinguished Graduate Leadership Award.

== Stop the Addiction Fatality Epidemic (SAFE) ==
After losing a son to opioid addiction, the Winnefeld family began dedicating themselves to studying the issue. They launched a website called SafeProject.us with the goal of saving other families from experiencing the same tragedy.

== Notes ==
Military offices
Preceded by John Dickson Stufflebeem	Commander of the United States Sixth Fleet; 2007-2008	Succeeded by Bruce W. Clingan
Preceded by John Dickson Stufflebeem	Commander of Naval Striking and Support Forces NATO; 2007-2008	Succeeded by Bruce W. Clingan
Preceded by John Dickson Stufflebeem	Commander of Allied Joint Force Command Lisbon; 2007-2008	Succeeded by Bruce W. Clingan
Preceded by John M. Paxton Jr.	Director for Strategic Plans and Policy of the Joint Staff; 2008-2010	Succeeded by Charles H. Jacoby Jr.
Preceded by Victor Renuart	Commander of the United States Northern Command; 2010–2011	Succeeded by Charles H. Jacoby Jr.
Preceded by Victor Renuart	Commander of the North American Aerospace Defense Command; 2010–2011	Succeeded by Charles H. Jacoby Jr.
Preceded by James Cartwright	Vice Chairman of the Joint Chiefs of Staff; 2011–2015	Succeeded by Paul J. Selva
Government offices
Preceded by Steve Feinberg	Chair of the President's Intelligence Advisory Board; 2022–present	Incumbent
