= Defense Distinguished Service Medal =

United States Department of Defense military decoration

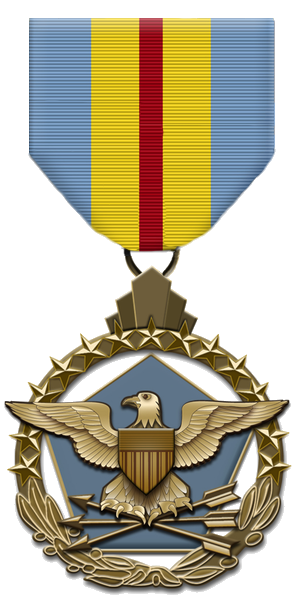
- Type: Military medal Distinguished service medal
- Awarded for: Exceptionally meritorious service in a duty of great responsibility
- Presented by: United States Department of Defense
- Eligibility: Members of the United States Armed Forces
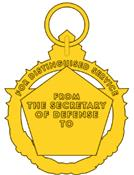
- Reverse
- Clasps: Oak leaf cluster and authorized devices
- Status: Currently awarded
- Established: July 9, 1970
- First award: General Earle Wheeler (1970)
- Service ribbon

Precedence
- Next (higher): Military Service Crosses (e.g., Distinguished Service Cross, Navy Cross, Air Force Cross)
- Equivalent: Homeland Security Distinguished Service Medal
- Next (lower): Military Service Distinguished Service Medals (e.g., Army Distinguished Service Medal, Navy Distinguished Service Medal, Air Force Distinguished Service Medal)

The Defense Distinguished Service Medal (DDSM) is a military decoration of the United States Department of Defense. It is awarded to members of the United States Armed Forces for exceptionally meritorious service in a duty of great responsibility contributing to the national security or defense of the United States. The medal was established on July 9, 1970, by President Richard Nixon in Executive Order 11545. The first award was presented to General Earle Wheeler upon his retirement after service as Chief of Staff of the United States Army and Chairman of the Joint Chiefs of Staff.

The Defense Distinguished Service Medal is the highest precedence joint personal military decoration awarded by the Department of Defense. It is equivalent in stature to the Homeland Security Distinguished Service Medal awarded by the United States Department of Homeland Security.

== Criteria ==
The Defense Distinguished Service Medal is awarded for exceptionally meritorious service in a duty of great responsibility while assigned to an organization or activity of the Department of Defense, including the Office of the Secretary of Defense, the Joint Chiefs of Staff, combatant commands, defense agencies, or other joint duty assignments designated by the Secretary of Defense.

The medal is normally awarded to the most senior members of the Armed Forces whose duties bring them into direct and frequent contact with the Secretary of Defense and other senior government officials, and whose performance and contributions to national security or defense are at the highest levels. Typical recipients include the Chairman of the Joint Chiefs of Staff, the Vice Chairman of the Joint Chiefs of Staff, commanders of the combatant commands, service chiefs and vice chiefs, and other senior leaders with direct responsibility for major activities or programs that significantly influence United States defense policy.

The medal may also be awarded to other senior members whose individual contributions to national security or defense are recognized as being so exceptional in scope and value as to be equivalent to contributions normally associated with positions of broader responsibility. The Defense Distinguished Service Medal is intended to recognize sustained exceptionally meritorious service, and it is normally awarded for a period exceeding 12 months encompassing the entirety of a joint assignment.

The Defense Distinguished Service Medal is worn after the Military Service Crosses and before the Distinguished Service Medals of the individual military services. It is not awarded for a period of service for which a military service Distinguished Service Medal has been awarded.

== Appearance ==
The Defense Distinguished Service Medal is gold in color. The obverse features a medium blue enameled pentagon, point upward, superimposed with a bald eagle with wings outstretched grasping three crossed arrows. On the eagle’s breast is a shield bearing the arms of the United States. Surrounding the pentagon is a gold circle consisting of thirteen five-pointed stars in the upper half and a wreath of laurel and olive branches in the lower half. The suspension is composed of five graduated gold rays.

The reverse bears the inscription “For Distinguished Service” at the top, with the inscription “From the Secretary of Defense To” within the pentagon.

== Devices ==
Subsequent awards of the Defense Distinguished Service Medal are denoted by oak leaf clusters. The medal may also be awarded with authorized devices, including the "C" device, in accordance with Department of Defense awards policy.

== Notable recipients ==
=== A ===
- John Abizaid (three awards)
- Creighton Abrams (two awards)
- John R. Allen (three awards)
- Lloyd Austin (five awards)

=== B ===
- Troy E. Black
- Dennis C. Blair (four awards)
- Gregg A. Blevins
- Jeremy M. Boorda (two awards)
- Frank Bowman
- Roger Brautigan
- Philip M. Breedlove
- William A. Brown (two awards)
- Nancy Elizabeth Brown
- James B. Busey IV (four awards)
- Ronald Burgess (two awards)

=== C ===
- Wendi B. Carpenter
- George W. Casey Jr. (four awards)
- Peter W. Chiarelli (three awards)
- Wesley Clark (five awards)
- Vern Clark (three awards)
- Bruce W. Clingan
- Ramon Colon-Lopez
- Robert H. Conn
- James T. Conway (three awards)
- Brad Cooper (two awards)
- Jay Coupe, Jr.
- Bantz J. Craddock (two awards)
- William J. Crowe (four awards)

=== D ===
- Michael P. DeLong
- Martin Dempsey (three awards)
- Walter Doran (two awards)

=== E ===
- Leon A. Edney
- James O. Ellis (two awards)

=== F ===
- Craig S. Faller
- William J. Fallon (two awards)
- Mark E. Ferguson III
- James R. Fitzgerald
- Mark P. Fitzgerald
- William J. Flanagan Jr.
- Michael Flynn
- Lisa Franchetti
- Tommy Franks
- Douglas M. Fraser

=== G ===
- John Galvin
- Noel Gayler (two awards)
- Harold W. Gehman Jr.
- Edmund P. Giambastiani Jr. (three awards)
- Andrew Goodpaster (two awards)
- William E. Gortney (two awards)
- Jonathan W. Greenert

=== H ===
- Alexander Haig (two awards)
- Cecil D. Haney
- Huntington Hardisty
- Harry B. Harris Jr. (two awards)
- John C. Harvey Jr.
- Thomas B. Hayward (two awards)
- Bradley A. Heithold
- James L. Holloway III (two awards)
- Alvin Holsey
- Grace Hopper
- Michelle Howard
- Jonathan Howe (six awards)
- Rick Husband

=== J ===
- Daniel James Jr.
- David E. Jeremiah
- Gregory G. Johnson (three awards)
- Jay L. Johnson (two awards)
- James L. Jones (four awards)
- George Joulwan (three awards)
- Eldon W. Joersz

=== K ===
- Timothy J. Keating (four awards)
- John F. Kelly
- Joseph D. Kernan (two awards)
- Frank B. Kelso II (two awards)
- Isaac C. Kidd Jr.
- George E. R. Kinnear II (two awards)
- Alexander F. Krichevsky

=== L ===
- Charles R. Larson
- Samuel J. Locklear (two awards)
- Deborah Loewer (two awards)
- Thomas J. Lopez

=== M ===
- Richard C. Macke
- Jim Mattis (two awards)
- Stanley A. McChrystal (two awards)
- William C. McCool
- Wesley L. McDonald
- William H. McRaven (three awards)
- Richard W. Mies
- Michael H. Miller
- Mark Milley (two awards)
- Thomas Hinman Moorer (two awards)
- Michael Mullen (four awards)
- Carl Epting Mundy Jr.
- Richard Myers (four awards)

=== O ===
- Raymond T. Odierno (five awards)
- Eric T. Olson
- William A. Owens

=== P ===
- Peter Pace (four awards)
- J. H. Binford Peay III
- David Petraeus (four awards)
- Donald L. Pilling (two awards)
- Colin Powell (four awards)
- Joseph Prueher

=== R ===
- Joseph Ralston (two awards)
- Dennis Reimer
- Victor E. Renuart Jr. (four awards)
- David M. Rodriguez (three awards)
- Bernard W. Rogers (two awards)
- Gary Roughead

=== S ===
- Ricardo Sanchez
- Curtis Scaparrotti (three awards)
- Peter Schoomaker (three awards)
- Norman Schwarzkopf Jr.
- Leighton W. Smith Jr.
- Eric Shinseki (two awards)
- John Shalikashvili (four awards)
- Hugh Shelton (four awards)
- James G. Stavridis (two awards)
- Vincent R. Stewart

=== T ===
- Patricia Ann Tracey (two awards)
- Carlisle A.H. Trost (two awards)
- Stephen J. Townsend
- Kurt W. Tidd (three awards)
- Harry D. Train II
- Thomas D. Waldhauser (three awards)

=== W ===
- William E. Ward (three awards)
- H. Marshal Ward
- James D. Watkins (two awards)
- Maurice F. Weisner (two awards)
- Earle Wheeler
- Charles E. Wilhelm
- Robert F. Willard
- James A. Winnefeld Jr. (three awards)

=== Z ===
- Ronald J. Zlatoper
- Anthony Zinni (two awards)
- John Zirkelbach (two awards)
