= Mark E. Ferguson III =

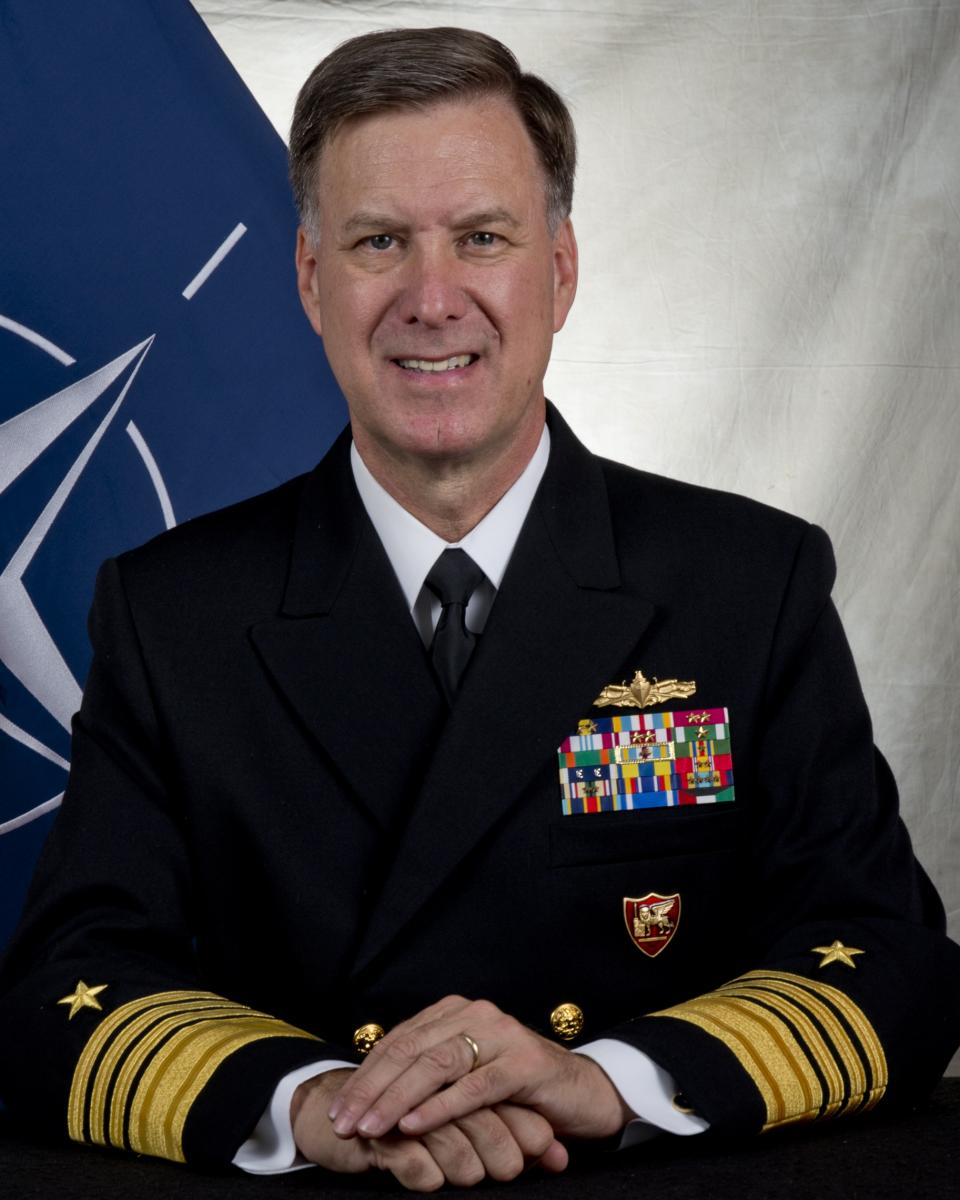
- Admiral Mark E. Ferguson III, USN
- Born: October 30, 1956 (age 69); Newfoundland, Canada
- Military career
- Allegiance: United States
- Branch: United States Navy
- Service years: 1978–2016
- Rank: Admiral
- Commands: United States Naval Forces Europe; Allied Joint Force Command Naples; Vice Chief of Naval Operations; Chief of Naval Personnel; Destroyer Squadron 18; USS Benfold (DDG-65)
- Conflicts: Gulf War
- Awards: Defense Distinguished Service Medal; Navy Distinguished Service Medal (3); Defense Superior Service Medal; Legion of Merit (3)

Mark E. Ferguson III (born October 30, 1956) is a retired United States Navy admiral who last served as Commander, United States Naval Forces Europe, United States Naval Forces Africa and Allied Joint Force Command Naples. Ferguson previously served as the 37th Vice Chief of Naval Operations from August 22, 2011, to July 1, 2014. Prior to that, he served as the 55th Chief of Naval Personnel and Deputy Chief of Naval Operations (Manpower, Personnel, Training & Education). He also served as chief of legislative affairs and assistant commander for distribution, Navy Personnel Command. He retired from active duty on July 1, 2016.

== Naval career ==
Ferguson entered the United States Naval Academy from Glen Burnie, Maryland, with the Class of 1978. He graduated tenth in his class, earning a bachelor's degree in systems engineering and the N* as a member of the lacrosse team.

Following graduation, Ferguson attended nuclear power school at Naval Training Center Orlando, Florida, and nuclear prototype training in Idaho Falls, Idaho. Following completion of surface warfare officer's school in Newport, Rhode Island, he was assigned to the USS South Carolina (CGN-37), serving on board from 1980 to 1983.

Ferguson reported to the Naval Postgraduate School in Monterey, California, and completed his master's degree in computer science. Following department head school, he reported in 1985 to the USS Fife (DD-991) as operations officer. From 1987 to 1989, he was assigned to the Bureau of Personnel in Washington, D.C., as an assignment officer.

From 1989 to 1992, he served as the reactor officer on board USS Dwight D. Eisenhower (CVN-69). During his tour, the ship participated in Operation Desert Storm and deployed to the United States European Command area of operations. Following this tour, he reported to the Department of the Navy Office of Legislative Affairs in Washington, D.C., as the officer responsible for readiness and surface warfare programs.

Ferguson was designated the first commanding officer of USS Benfold (DDG-65) and reported in 1995 to Pascagoula, Mississippi, with the pre-commissioning crew. On March 30, 1996, the USS Benfold was commissioned in San Diego, California. During Ferguson's command tour, the ship was awarded multiple department awards, and subsequently, the Battle 'E' and the Spokane Trophy for the readiness cycle. In his article "Retention Through Redemption" in Harvard Business Review and subsequent book It's Your Ship, author D. Michael Abrashoff referred to his predecessor in USS Benfold. Although his name was not explicitly mentioned, it was implied the person was Ferguson.

In June 1997, Ferguson entered the Harvard Kennedy School in Cambridge, Massachusetts, as a National Security Fellow. In August 1998, he reported to the staff of Supreme Allied Commander, Europe in Mons, Belgium, as a special assistant to the SACEUR. During this tour, he participated in Operation Allied Force, the NATO Air Campaign in the Balkans.

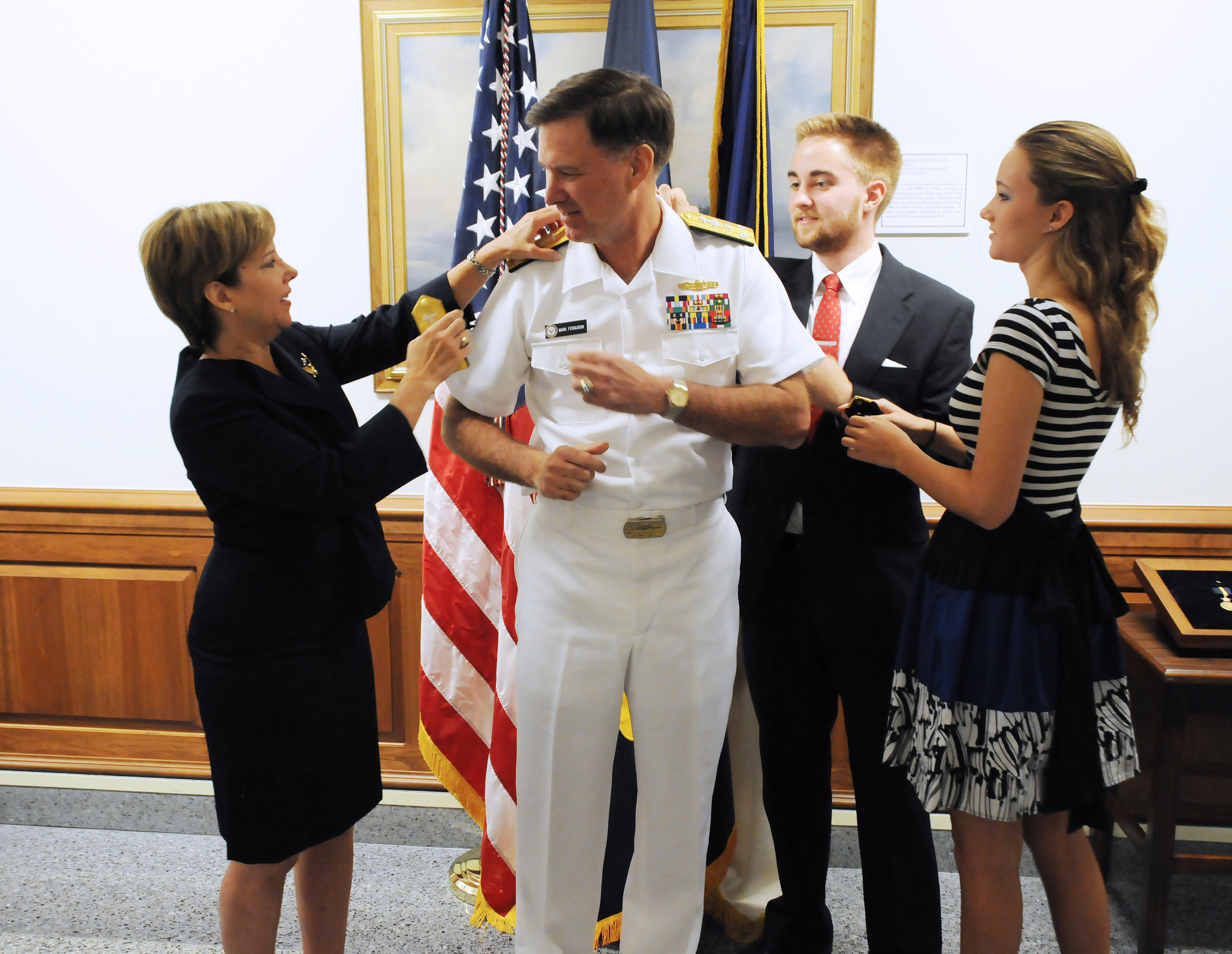
Ferguson is promoted to admiral, August 22, 2011.

Upon returning from overseas, Ferguson reported as the commander of Destroyer Squadron 18 based in Norfolk, Virginia, as part of the USS Enterprise Strike Group. On September 11, he was commander of Task Force 60 in the Mediterranean. In October, he returned to the navy's Office of Legislative Affairs as the director of the Senate Liaison Office. In 2003, he was selected for flag rank and reported as the assistant commander for distribution (PERS-4) at the Navy Personnel Command in Millington, Tennessee. In 2005, he was ordered to be the navy's chief of legislative affairs in Washington, D.C., and promoted to rear admiral.

In April 2008, Ferguson was promoted to vice admiral and reported as the navy's Chief of Naval Personnel. During his tour, the navy was the first federal agency to receive the Optimas Award for General Excellence by Workforce Management Magazine for innovative personnel policies. He was recognized for the introduction of flexible work programs such as telework, professional sabbaticals, and professional credentialing for navy work experience. He was the personnel policy team leader for the Report of the Comprehensive Review of the Issues Associated with the Repeal of "Don't Ask, Don't Tell", whose publication led to the repeal of the law, and was instrumental in the return of NROTC to Ivy League campuses.

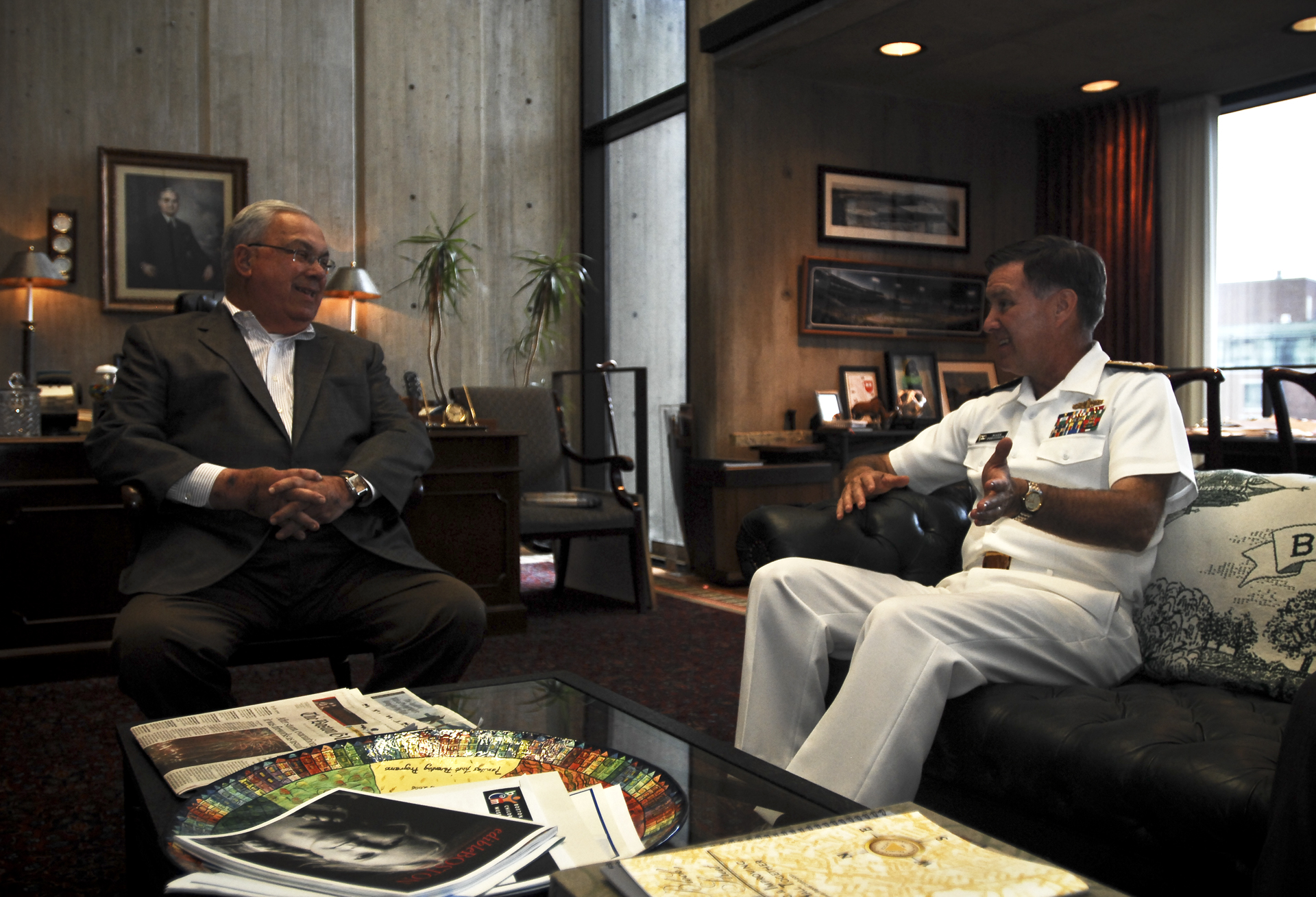
Ferguson, at right, with Mayor of Boston Thomas Menino in 2012

On August 22, 2011, Ferguson was promoted to admiral and began his term as the 37th Vice Chief of Naval Operations. During this period, he testified before Congress on the impact of sequestration on the readiness of the force.

After assuming command of United States Naval Forces Europe in July 2014, Ferguson was quoted on Russian activity in Crimea and in Europe. He spoke at the Atlantic Council in October 2015 regarding Russia, and was cited in the press regarding resurgent Russian Navy and their construction of an 'arc of steel' from the Arctic to the Mediterranean. During his tenure in command, the navy completed the deployment of four Arleigh Burke-class destroyers to Rota, Spain, and activated the AEGIS ballistic missile defense site at the former Devaselu Airbase in Romania. His tour was marked by a renewed focus on 'high-end' naval operations in the European theater.

Ferguson was recognized for his support of navy personnel and was designated an honorary chief petty officer, recognized by the SEALs as an 'honorary frogman', and named a distinguished graduate of the Naval Postgraduate School. In 2015, he received the Ellis Island Award in New York for his work in innovative personnel policies supporting service members and their families.

He was selected in 2021 to serve as Chairman of the Board of Trustees of the U.S. Naval Academy Alumni Association.

== Awards and decorations ==

Surface Warfare Officer Pin
Defense Distinguished Service Medal
Navy Distinguished Service Medal w/ 2 award stars	Defense Superior Service Medal	Legion of Merit w/ 2 award stars
Defense Meritorious Service Medal	Meritorious Service Medal w/ 2 award stars	Navy and Marine Corps Commendation Medal w/ 1 award star
Navy and Marine Corps Achievement Medal	Joint Meritorious Unit Award w/ 1 oak leaf cluster	Navy Meritorious Unit Commendation w/ 1 service star
Navy E Ribbon	Navy Expeditionary Medal	National Defense Service Medal w/ 2 service stars
Southwest Asia Service Medal w/ 2 campaign stars	Global War on Terrorism Service Medal	Navy Sea Service Deployment Ribbon w/ 4 service stars
Navy & Marine Corps Overseas Service Ribbon	NATO Medal for Yugoslavia service	Kuwait Liberation Medal (Kuwait)
Allied Joint Force Command Naples

== See also ==
- List of members of the American Legion

Military offices
Preceded by Jonathan W. Greenert	Vice Chief of Naval Operations; 2011–2014	Succeeded by Michelle J. Howard
Preceded by Bruce W. Clingan	Commander of Allied Joint Force Command Naples; 2014–2016	Succeeded by Michelle J. Howard
Preceded by Bruce W. Clingan	Commander of United States Naval Forces Europe; 2014–2016	Succeeded by Michelle J. Howard
Preceded by Bruce W. Clingan	Commander of United States Naval Forces Africa; 2014–2016	Succeeded by Michelle J. Howard
