= H. Marshal Ward =

United States Air Force general

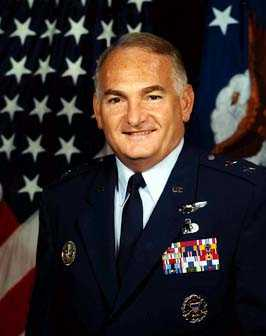
- Major General Ward
- Born: November 2, 1946 (age 79); Santurce, Puerto Rico
- Military career
- Allegiance: United States of America
- Branch: United States Air Force
- Service years: 1966-2001
- Rank: Major General
- Commands: Director of special programs for Office of Undersecretary of Defense
- Conflicts: Gulf War
- Awards: Defense Superior Service Medal; Legion of Merit; Meritorious Service Medal; Air Force Commendation Medal

H. Marshal Ward (born November 2, 1946, in San Turce, Puerto Rico) was a Major General in the U.S. Air Force. His last post was to serve as Director of special programs for Office of Undersecretary of Defense.

Prior to that position he served as Director of requirements at the Air Force Space Command Headquarters at Peterson Air Force Base in Colorado. In addition Ward served as Deputy Director for operational requirements at the Headquarters for the U.S. Air Force.

== Education ==
In 1968, while serving in the military, the general graduated from Florida State University with a bachelor's degree. He then in 1972 graduated from squadron officer school. He got both his master's degree in business administration and finished the Air Command Staff College in 1982. Finally, in 1988 he graduated from the Industrial College of the Armed Forces.

== Military career ==
In 1966 Marshal Ward enlisted in the air force. Later, he graduated from Florida State University after participating in the Airman's Education and Commissioning Program. He was commissioned Lieutenant after he completed Officer Training School in 1969. He has held numerous assignments in weather forecasting, hurricane reconnaissance, airlift operations, command and control operations, communications, space and missile plans and policy, acquisition program management, and operational requirements.

== Post-military career ==
After retiring from the air force in 2001, Ward joined BAE Systems, serving as the vice president and general manager for the Electronics and Space Systems business area of BAE Systems. In this position, he was partially responsible for the founding of the business area. In his position he successfully facilitated the growth of the business area to US$270m in revenue. Later, he left BAE Systems and joined Integral Systems as a chief operating officer.
