= John Dickson Stufflebeem =

American retired military officer

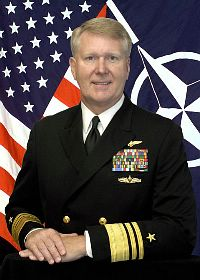
- Stufflebeem as a vice admiral
- Military career
- Allegiance: United States of America
- Branch: United States Navy
- Service years: 1969–2008
- Rank: Vice Admiral; Retired as a Rear Admiral
- Nickname: Boomer
- Commands: Director, Navy Staff; 6th Fleet; Carrier Group Two; Fighter Squadron Eighty-Four; Carrier Air Wing One
- Awards: Legion of Merit (4); Bronze Star; Air Medal (2)

John Dickson "Boomer" Stufflebeem is a former United States Navy vice admiral who last served in that rank as the director of Navy Staff. Stufflebeem served 39 years in the Navy and is well known for his football career and television briefings from the Pentagon following the attacks of 9/11 and subsequent military operations in Afghanistan. He is the Senior Vice President and founder of the NJS Group, LLC, a company specializing in strategic communications and planning as well as crisis management.

== Naval Academy and football ==
Stufflebeem enlisted in the Navy Reserve in 1969 beginning his service as a deck seaman before being accepted into the United States Naval Academy in 1971. Stufflebeem played on the Naval Academy football team, earning the nickname "Boomer" for his prowess as a punter. He earned All-East Coast Athletic Conference and Sports Illustrated honors in 1974 when his punting kept Navy competitive in a game versus Notre Dame until the last quarter. Navy lost the game, played in Philadelphia, 14–6.

He graduated from the academy in 1975. Although undrafted by any NFL team, his first assignment to the Detroit area allowed him to participate in three pre-seasons of professional football with the Detroit Lions.

== Military career ==
Stufflebeem was designated a Surface Warfare Officer in 1978 and Naval Aviator in 1980. As a commissioned officer, Stufflebeem served operational tours in a surface combatant, various fighter squadrons and carrier air wing staffs in the Pacific and Atlantic Fleets. He commanded Fighter Squadron Eighty-Four and Carrier Air Wing One during combat operations in the Balkans and Persian Gulf and Carrier Group Two/Task Force 60 during Operation Iraqi Freedom. Stufflebeem has flown over 4,000 hours in a variety of fighter aircraft and has more than 1,000 aircraft carrier landings.

Additionally, Stufflebeem has served in staff assignments including Military Aide to President George H. W. Bush, Deputy Executive Assistant and later, Executive Assistant to the Chief of Naval Operations. His first assignment as a flag officer was deputy director for Global Operations (J-3) on the Joint Staff during Operation Enduring Freedom.

On May 20, 2005, at Naval Support Activity Naples, Stufflebeem was promoted to vice admiral and took command of the 6th Fleet, relieving then-Vice Admiral Harry Ulrich. He held this position until September 2007.

=== Pentagon spokesperson ===
Following the attacks on the U.S. of September 11, 2001, then Rear Admiral Stufflebeem became the face and voice from the Pentagon of U.S. military operations being conducted in Afghanistan to remove the Taliban from power and rid the country of al Qaeda. For months he provided briefings from The Pentagon to international television and radio media on the prosecution of what was known as Operation Enduring Freedom as most reporters were not in Afghanistan during this time.

=== NATO ===
While serving as the commander of the U.S. Sixth Fleet and NATO's operational command in Lisbon, Portugal, then Vice Admiral Stufflebeem led the first deployment of NATO Response Force troops out of the European theater to Pakistan. This was a humanitarian assistance and disaster relief mission in response to the 2005 Kashmir earthquake. Additionally, he supported the African Union Mission in Sudan, the political-military mission to address the problems occurring in Darfur.

=== Controversy ===
In December 2007, Stufflebeem assumed the duties of Director, Navy Staff, relieving then-Vice Admiral Mark P. Fitzgerald. Early in 2008, the Department of Defense began an investigation into an allegation that Stufflebeem had an affair while serving as a presidential military aide to the White House in 1990. The Navy announced on March 24, 2008, that Stufflebeem was removed as director of the Navy Staff. His removal was directly due to the false and misleading testimony Stufflebeem gave to investigators and in conversations with his seniors on multiple occasions. As a result, Stufflebeem reverted to his permanent two-star rank. In April 2008, the US Navy announced that Stufflebeem had received a written reprimand as a result of non-judicial punishment following the investigation. He subsequently retired from the Navy with the rank of rear admiral.

== Awards and recognitions ==
In 2000 at its annual awards banquet, the NCAA honored Stufflebeem as one of its Silver Anniversary Award Recipients that recognizes up to six nationally distinguished former student-athletes on their 25th anniversary as college graduates. In 2003 Bill Belichick (who was the special teams coach of the Detroit Lions in 1976) had Stufflebeem deliver a message to the New England Patriots before a game.

=== Military awards and decorations ===
Stufflebeem's military decorations include the Navy Distinguished Service Medal, Defense Superior Service Medal, Legion of Merit (four awards), Bronze Star, Meritorious Service Medal, and Air Medal (two strike/flight awards).

Navy Distinguished Service Medal
Defense Superior Service Medal w/ one Oak Leaf Cluster
Legion of Merit with three Gold Stars
Bronze Star Medal
Meritorious Service Medal
Air Medal w/ Bronze Numeral "2"
Navy and Marine Corps Commendation Medal with one Gold Star
Navy and Marine Corps Achievement Medal
Navy Unit Commendation
Meritorious Unit Commendation with two Bronze Stars
Navy "E" Ribbon
National Defense Service Medal with two Bronze Stars
Armed Forces Expeditionary Medal
Southwest Asia Service Medal with one Bronze Star
Global War on Terrorism Expeditionary Medal
Global War on Terrorism Service Medal
Armed Forces Service Medal
Humanitarian Service Medal
Sea Service Deployment Ribbon with one Silver Star and one Bronze Star
Navy and Marine Corps Overseas Service Ribbon w/ one Bronze Star
National Order of the Legion of Honour of France (Knight degree)
Military Merit Medal of the Portuguese Republic (First Class)
NATO Meritorious Service Medal
NATO Medal for ex-Yugoslavia
Inter-American Defense Board Medal
Kuwait Liberation Medal (Kuwait)
Navy Pistol Marksmanship Ribbon w/ Bronze "S"

=== Foreign awards ===
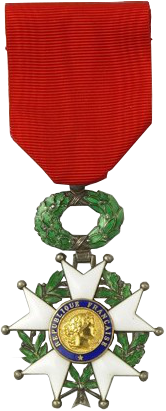
Chevalier De La Légion D'Honneur (France)

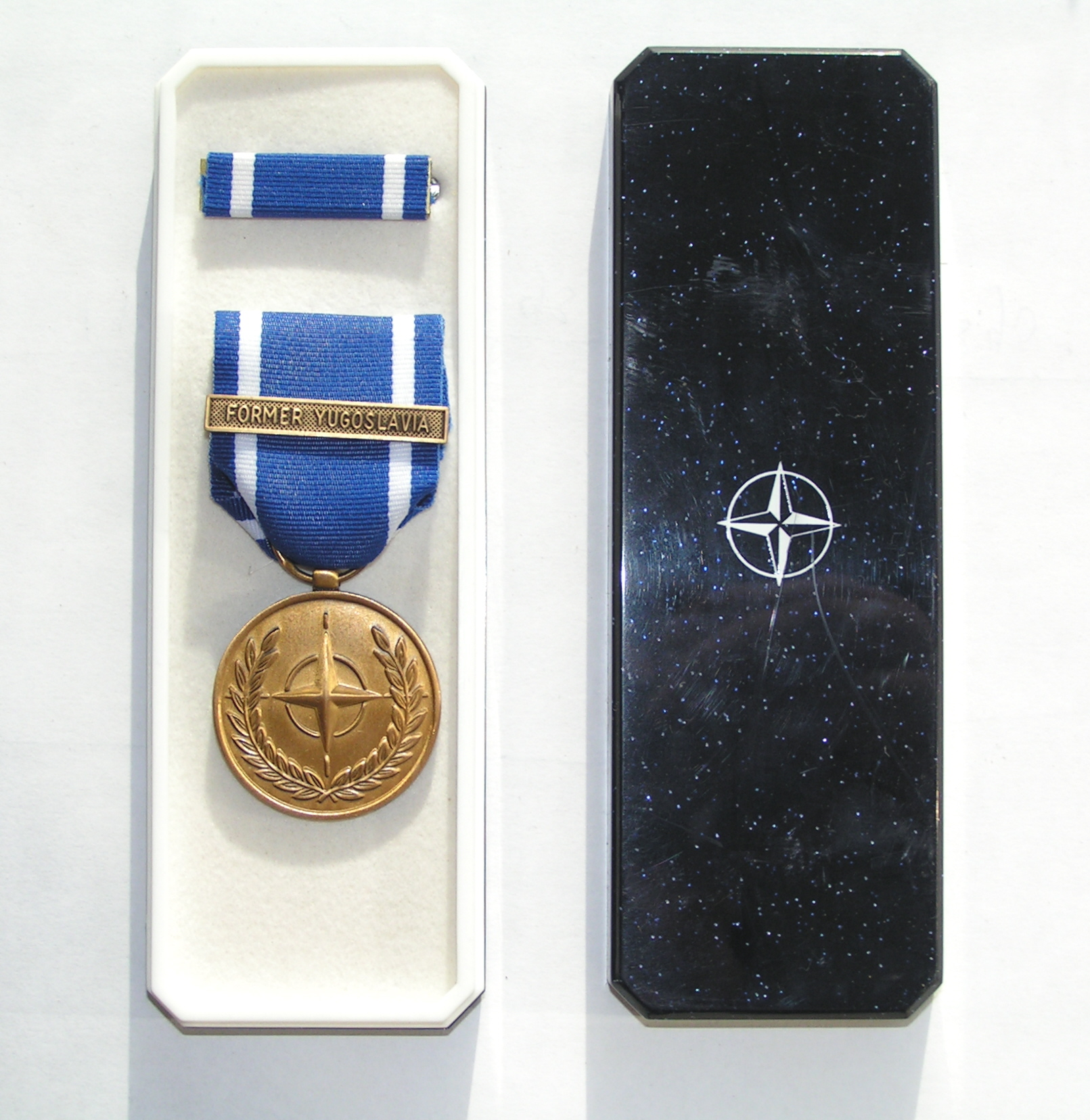
Non Article 5 NATO Medal (Pakistan)

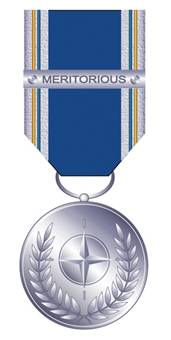
NATO Meritorious Service Medal

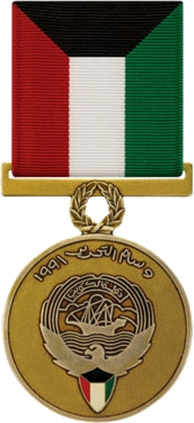
Kuwait Liberation Medal (Kuwait)

=== Devices and badges ===
Naval Aviator Wings

Surface Warfare Officer pin

Office of the Joint Chiefs of Staff Identification Badge

Presidential Service Badge
