= John B. Totushek =

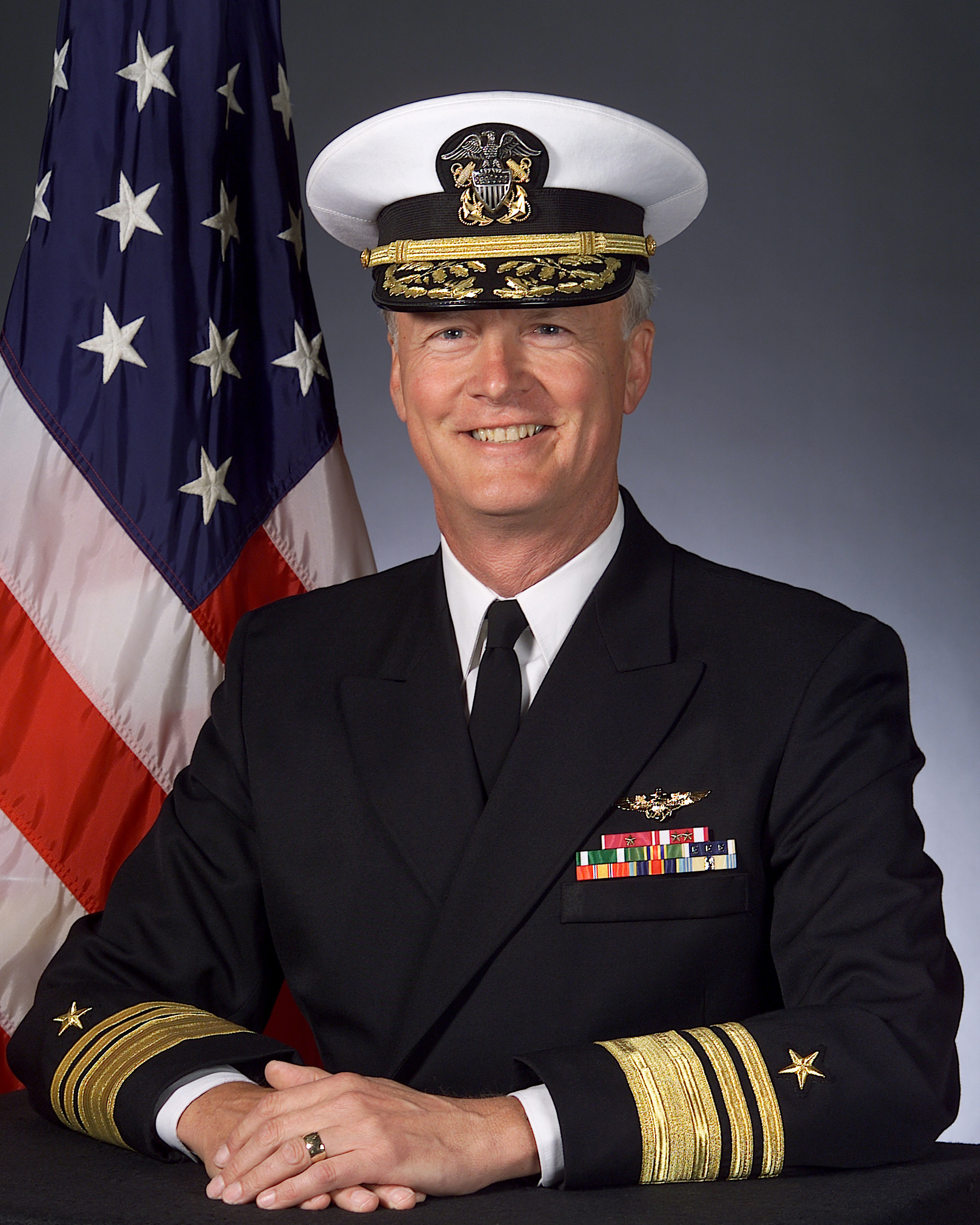
- Born: September 7, 1944 (age 82); Minneapolis, Minnesota
- Military career
- Allegiance: United States
- Branch: United States Navy
- Service years: 1966–2003
- Rank: Vice admiral
- Commands: United States Naval Reserve; Reserve Command Southeast; Logistics Task Force Atlantic; Reserve Naval Air Forces Atlantic; VC-12
- Awards: Navy Distinguished Service Medal; Legion of Merit (2)

John Benjamin Totushek (born September 7, 1944) is a retired vice admiral in the United States Navy. He was Chief of the United States Naval Reserve from October 1998 until October 2003. After retirement, he served as president and CEO of the United States Navy Memorial Foundation from November 2011 to July 2016.

== Early life and education ==
Totushek was born the second of four children to John Bednar and Lorraine Elizabeth (Blomquist) Totushek in Minneapolis, Minnesota. He attended Theodore Roosevelt High School, where he was involved in student government, representing the school the citywide student council. He lettered in cross country and basketball and was co-captain of the team in his senior year. We was named to the second team All-City squad. Totushek earned a scholarship in the Naval Reserve Officers Training Corps at the University of Minnesota. He was president of the Beta Mu chapter of Kappa Sigma in 1964 and graduated and commissioned in December 1966. Ensign Totushek reported to NAS Pensacola in January 1967 as a student Naval Aviator and received his wings in 1968 with orders to the Black Aces of VF-41 at NAS Oceana, Virginia to fly the F-4 Phantom II.

== Military career ==
In VF-41 Totushek worked in the maintenance and operations divisions and qualified as a landing signals officer (LSO). With the squadron he made two Mediterranean cruises in 1970 and 1971. Between cruises he proposed to Janet Lynne Benda, and they were married December 19, 1970. In August 1971 he received orders to VF-101, the Replacement Air Group (the training squadron for pilots qualifying in the F4), as the LSO Phase head. In this role he trained aircrews in carrier landing techniques and introduced the new replacement crews to night carrier landings. He also created and taught the Phase One LSO School at NAS Oceana.

Totushek decided to resign his regular commission and became a reserve officer, serving in several reserve squadrons. In 1975, he joined VC-12 flying a four different A4 Skyhawk models. In 1965, he became the commanding officer of the squadron. Upon completion of his command tour, he served in a number of reserve units at NAS Norfolk, Virginia, including a role as executive assistant to the commander US Commander Naval Air Forces Atlantic, commanding officer of Commander Naval Forces Eastern Atlantic and chief of staff of the newly formed Logistics Task Force Atlantic. In 1993, he was selected to flag rank as a rear admiral (lower half). His flag billets included: Chief of Staff US Naval Forces Atlantic, commander Logistics Task Force Atlantic, deputy air warfare division director on the Chief of Naval Operations (CNO) staff and commander Reserve Readiness Region Eight headquartered at NAS Jacksonville, Florida. In 1996 he was promoted to rear admiral. The following year he was recalled to active duty and reported to the CNO Staff as the director of environmental protection, safety and occupational health in Washington, D.C. In early 1998 he reported to the chief of Naval Reserve as deputy and in October of that year became the tenth chief of Naval Reserve, commander of the Naval Reserve Force and director of Naval Reserve. In 2002, he was promoted to vice admiral.

Totushek retired from the navy in November 2003. During his career, he amassed in excess of 3000 hours of flight time and 300 carrier landings. Totushek was awarded the Navy Distinguished Service Medal, Legion of Merit (2 awards), Meritorious Service Medal (3 awards), Navy and Marine Corps Commendation Medal, National Defense Service Medal, Global War on Terrorism Service Medal, Navy Armed Forces Reserve Medal with Silver Hourglass device.

== Civilian career ==
Upon leaving active service in 1973, Totushek co-founded Meredith Swimming Pool Enterprises in Virginia Beach, Virginia and became its president. In 1980, he became a project manager for SRI International, the first of several commercial construction companies. In 1984, he moved to the Murray Company, where he became regional manager for the Mid-Atlantic Region. He moved to McKenzie Construction Company as vice president in 1994, where he worked until being recalled to active duty in 1997. Upon leaving active duty, he became a senior vice-president of The Staubach Company, a commercial real estate company in Washington, D.C. In 2008, The Staubach Company was acquired by Jones Lange LaSalle, an international commercial company, where he became a managing director. In 2011, he was asked to become the president and CEO of the US Navy Memorial Foundation where he worked until his retirement in 2016.
