= James A. Winnefeld Sr. =

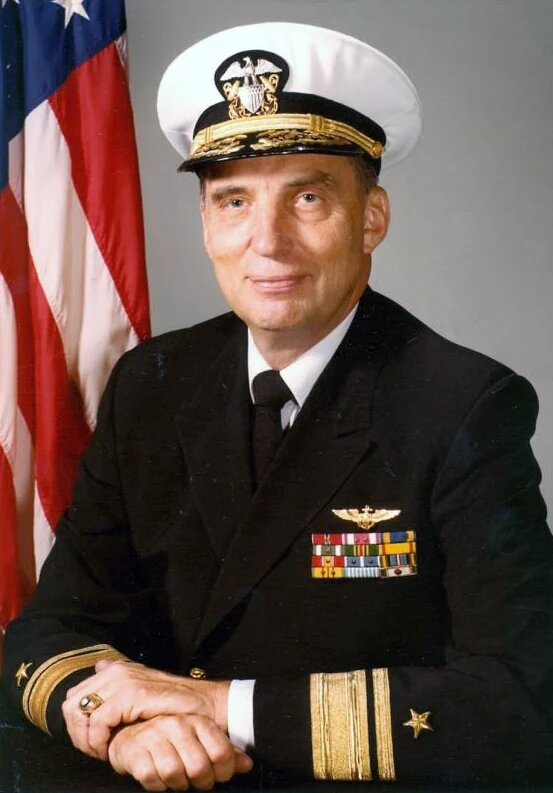
- Born: January 1, 1929; Paterson, New Jersey, U.S.
- Died: November 26, 2015 (aged 86); Annapolis, Maryland, U.S.
- Relatives: ADM James A. Winnefeld Jr. (son)
- Military career
- Allegiance: United States
- Branch: United States Navy
- Service years: 1951-1978
- Rank: Rear admiral

James Alexander Winnefeld Sr. (January 1, 1929 – November 26, 2015) was a rear admiral in the United States Navy. He is the father of James "Sandy" Winnefeld, who served as an Admiral in the United States Navy. He graduated from the United States Naval Academy in 1951.

== Career ==
Winnefeld graduated from the U.S. Naval Academy with the Class of 1951. He saw active service in combat in both the Korean and Vietnam Wars.

In 1960 he was awarded a Master of Arts in international affairs from Stanford University. From 1976 to 1978, he served as commandant of midshipmen at the Naval Academy.

== Death ==
Winnefeld died at the Ginger Cove retirement community in Annapolis, Maryland, aged 86, on November 26, 2015. He was survived by his wife, the Honorable Judith L. Duckett (Judge, Orphans' Court, Anne Arundel County, 1990–94, 1998–2002, and October 1, 2009, to December 31, 2015); their daughter, Lea Sandman; their son, Sandy Winnefeld; and six grandchildren.
