= Henry G. Ulrich III =

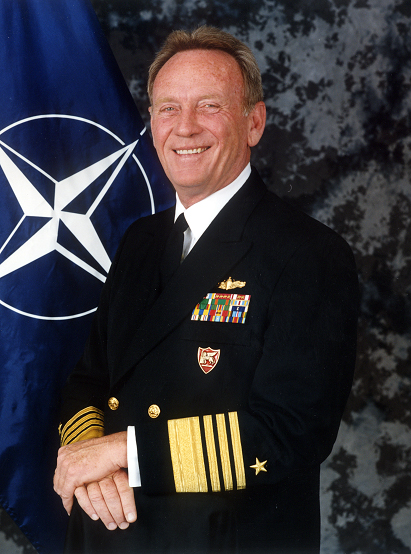
- Admiral Henry G. "Harry" Ulrich III
- Born: 1950 (age 75–76); Southampton, Pennsylvania, U.S.
- Military career
- Allegiance: United States
- Branch: United States Navy
- Service years: 1972–2007
- Rank: Admiral
- Nickname: Harry
- Commands: United States Naval Forces Europe; Allied Joint Force Command Naples; United States Sixth Fleet; Naval Striking and Support Forces NATO; Allied Joint Command Lisbon
- Awards: Defense Superior Service Medal (3); Legion of Merit (5); Meritorious Service Medal (3); Navy and Marine Corps Commendation Medal; Navy and Marine Corps Achievement Medal

Henry George "Harry" Ulrich III (born 1950) was a four-star admiral in the United States Navy who served as the Commander, United States Naval Forces Europe and Commander, Allied Joint Force Command Naples from May 23, 2005 to November 30, 2007. He retired from the navy shortly afterwards.

As Commander, Allied Joint Force Command Naples, he had operational responsibility for NATO missions in the Balkans, Iraq and the Mediterranean. As Commander, United States Naval Forces Europe he is responsible for providing overall command, operational control, and coordination of United States Naval forces in the European Command area of responsibility.

== Previous assignments ==
Ulrich has served in a broad range of sea and shore assignments. As a Surface Warfare Officer, he has served seven sea tours with units of the Atlantic Fleet, and has participated in eight deployments to South America, West Africa, Northern and Southern Europe, and the Persian Gulf. During his last operational assignment, Ulrich served simultaneously as Commander, United States Sixth Fleet, Commander, Naval Striking and Support Forces NATO, and Commander, Allied Joint Command Lisbon.

Shore assignments include duty on the Joint Staff and the staff of the Chief of Naval Operations. He has served as Director of Cruise Missile Plans and Policy, as well as Director of Surface Warfare. In 2001, he was selected to lead the revolution in United States Navy training as Commander, Task Force Excel.

== Awards and decorations ==

Surface Warfare Officer Pin
Defense Superior Service Medal with two bronze oak leaf clusters	Legion of Merit with four gold award stars	Meritorious Service Medal with two award stars
Navy and Marine Corps Commendation Medal	Navy and Marine Corps Achievement Medal	Joint Meritorious Unit Award
Navy Unit Commendation	Navy Meritorious Unit Commendation	Navy E Ribbon
Navy Expeditionary Medal	National Defense Service Medal with two bronze service stars	Armed Forces Expeditionary Medal
Southwest Asia Service Medal with service star	Navy Sea Service Deployment Ribbon with silver service star	Navy & Marine Corps Overseas Service Ribbon
Allied Joint Force Command Naples

== Personal background and education ==
A native of Southampton, Pennsylvania, Ulrich is a 1972 graduate of the United States Naval Academy. In 1981, he earned a Master of Science degree in Physics from the United States Naval Postgraduate School, and has also studied at the National War College in Washington, D.C. He now works at Enterra.
