= Nancy Elizabeth Brown =

United States admiral

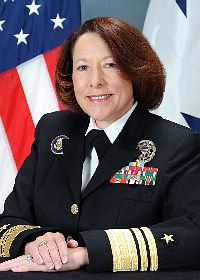
- Vice Admiral Nancy E. Brown
- Born: 1952 (age 73–74)
- Military career
- Allegiance: United States of America
- Branch: United States Navy
- Service years: 1974–2009
- Rank: Vice Admiral
- Units: Director, Command, Control, Communications and Computer Systems (C4 Systems)
- Commands: Naval Computer and Telecommunications Area Master Station Atlantic
- Conflicts: Iraq War
- Awards: Defense Distinguished Service Medal; Defense Superior Service Medal (3); Legion of Merit (2); Bronze Star; Defense Meritorious Service Medal (2); Meritorious Service Medal; Navy and Marine Corps Commendation Medal

Vice Admiral Nancy E. Brown (born 1952) is a retired vice admiral in the United States Navy who most recently served as the Director, Command, Control, Communications and Computer Systems (C4 Systems), The Joint Staff. She was the principal advisor to the Chairman of the Joint Chiefs of Staff on all C4 systems matters within the Department of Defense. Her service spanned 32 years. She retired in 2009.

Prior to her final assignment, Vice Adm. Brown was the Director of Command Control Systems, Headquarters North American Aerospace Defense Command and Director of Architectures and Integration, Headquarters U.S. Northern Command, Peterson Air Force Base, Colorado. She also served as the Commander, Navy Element and Chief Information Officer for both commands.

== Biography ==
Vice Adm. Brown is a native of Glen Cove, New York. She was raised in Marion, Illinois, and is a 1973 graduate of Stephens College in Columbia, Missouri.

== Naval career ==
Following completion of Officer Candidate School in Newport, Rhode Island, in June 1974, Vice Adm. Brown reported to her first duty station, Naval Communications Station, Norfolk, Virginia She was assigned as communications watch officer, followed by automation officer and personnel officer. She then served as the special projects and manpower requirements officer at the Naval Telecommunications Command in Washington, D.C. After her tour in Washington, D.C., Vice Adm. Brown attended Naval Postgraduate School in Monterey, California, where she earned a Master of Science degree in Communications Systems Management. She was then assigned to the Defense Commercial Communications Office at Scott Air Force Base in Belleville, Illinois. This joint tour qualified Vice Adm. Brown as a proven subspecialist in communications and led to her designation as a joint specialty officer (JSO).

From this joint assignment, Vice Adm. Brown was enrolled in the Junior Course at the Naval War College in Newport, Rhode Island. Completion of this course led to the awarding of a Master of Arts Degree in National Security and Strategic Studies. Her follow-on assignment was as the officer in charge, Naval Radio and Receiving Facility Kamiseya, Japan.

Returning from overseas, Vice Adm. Brown was assigned to the Joint Tactical Command, Control and Communications Agency in Washington. After this second joint tour, she was assigned as the executive officer (XO) at the Naval Communications Station in San Diego, California. A major segment of this tour was devoted to the establishment of the Naval Computer and Telecommunications Station, San Diego.

Upon completing this XO tour, Vice Adm. Brown was enrolled in the Senior Course at the Army War College in Carlisle, Pennsylvania. In August 1993, Vice Adm. Brown assumed command of Naval Computer and Telecommunications Station Cutler, Downeast, Maine. After completing her command tour, she was selected for assignment to the National Security Council staff at the White House where she reported for duty in August 1995.

In July 1997, Vice Adm. Brown assumed command of the Naval Computer and Telecommunications Area Master Station Atlantic headquartered in Norfolk, Virginia. Completing her command tour in June 1999, Vice Adm. Brown returned to the White House as the deputy director, White House Military Office. It was during this tour Vice Adm. Brown was selected for Rear Admiral.

In October 2000, she reported to the Chief of Naval Operations as deputy director and Fleet Liaison, Space, Information Warfare, Command and Control (N6B). In August 2002 she assumed duties as Vice Director for Command, Control, Communications, and Computer Systems (J6), the Joint Staff.

In August 2004 she deployed to Iraq becoming the first Multi-National Force–Iraq C6 Headquartered in Baghdad and returned to the Joint Staff in April 2005. In August 2005 Vice Adm. Brown assumed the duties as J6 Director for both North American Aerospace Defense Command and United States Northern Command. In August 2006 she assumed her duties as the Director, Command, Control, Communications and Computer Systems (C4 Systems), The Joint Staff.

== Education ==
Vice Adm. Brown graduated from Stephens College in Columbia, Missouri in 1973 with a bachelor's degree in education. She attended Naval Postgraduate School in Monterey, California, where she earned a Master of Science degree in Communications Systems Management. Brown completed the Junior Course at the Naval War College in Newport, Rhode Island, leading to the awarding of a Master of Arts degree in National Security and Strategic Studies.

== Awards and decorations ==
Vice Adm. Brown's decorations include the Defense Distinguished Service Medal, the Defense Superior Service Medal (with two Oak Leaf Clusters), the Legion of Merit (with Gold Star), the Bronze Star, the Defense Meritorious Service Medal (with Oak Leaf Cluster), the Meritorious Service Medal, the Navy and Marine Corps Commendation Medal, the Navy and Marine Corps Achievement Medal, the Iraq Campaign Medal (with two Bronze Stars), the Global War on Terrorism Service Medal, the Armed Forces Service Medal, and the National Defense Service Medal (with two Bronze Stars).

- Defense Distinguished Service Medal
- Defense Superior Service Medal with two oak leaf clusters
- Legion of Merit with Gold Star
- Bronze Star
- Defense Meritorious Service Medal with oak leaf cluster
- Meritorious Service Medal with Gold Star
- Navy and Marine Corps Commendation Medal
- Navy and Marine Corps Achievement Medal
- Iraq Campaign Medal
- Global War on Terrorism Service Medal
- Armed Forces Service Medal
- National Defense Service Medal with two bronze stars

== See also ==
- Women in the United States Navy
