= Allied Joint Force Command Lisbon =

Former NATO command (1967–2012)

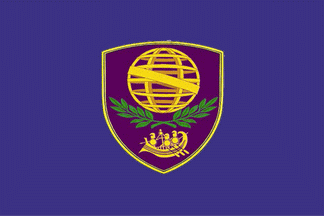
- Joint Force Command Lisbon Emblem
- Active: 1967–1982 COMIBERLANT; 1982–1999 CINCIBERLANT; 1999–2004 CINCSOUTHLANT; 2004–2012 Joint Command Lisbon
- Part of: Allied Command Europe (1967–2003); Allied Command Operations (2003–Present)
- Garrison/HQ: Oeiras, Lisbon Region
- Engagements: Pakistan earthquake relief 2006

The Allied Joint Force Command Lisbon was one of the largest NATO bases in south Europe Allied Command Operations. It was based in Oeiras, near Lisbon, Portugal. In 2009 a French lieutenant general took command from the previous US Navy admiral who had filled the post for a number of years. It was deactivated in 2012.

== History ==
In 1950, the command structure and organization of Allied Command Atlantic (ACLANT) was approved except that the North Atlantic Ocean Regional Group was requested to reconsider the command arrangements for the Iberian Atlantic Area (IBERLANT). IBERLANT was an integral part of this ACLANT command structure. In MC 58(Revised) (Final), it was stated that the question of subdividing IBERLANT was still under study. However, because arrangement regarding the establishment of IBERLANT, could not be agreed, CINCEASTLANT and CINCAIREASTLANT were assigned, as an interim emergency measure, the temporary responsibility for the IBERLANT area. NATO exercises, however, demonstrated that these interim arrangements proved unsatisfactory.

Commander Iberian Atlantic Area was eventually established in 1967 as a Principal Subordinate Commander (PSC), reporting to CINCWESTLANT. The commander was a U.S. Navy rear admiral who also served as chief of the Military Assistance and Advisory Group in Lisbon. In 1975 IBERLANT was described as 'probably of greater symbolic value to Portugal than of military value to NATO' in internal cables of the U.S. Department of State. In 1981 the command included the Island Command Madeira.

From 1972, for many years during the Cold War, Oeiras was home to Commander Iberian Atlantic. Commanders during this period included Rear Admiral Eugene B. Fluckley and Robert Erly of the U.S. Navy. In 1982 NATO agreed to the upgrading of IBERLANT into a Major Subordinate Command (MSC), becoming Commander-in-Chief Iberian Atlantic Area (CINCIBERLANT). On September 18, 1982, the Defence Committee of the North Atlantic Council redesignated Commander IBERLANT (COMIBERLANT) as Commander-in-Chief IBERLANT (CINCIBERLANT) and the Portuguese Vice-Admiral Ilídio Elias da Costa took command. da Costa was dual-hatted as the fleet commander (Commando Navale). CINCIBERLANT was responsible to SACLANT in Norfolk, Virginia.

It was planned that Commander, Portuguese Air (COMPOAIR), a sub-PSC, would eventually take responsibility for the air defence of Portugal, reporting through CINCIBERLANT to SACEUR. Thus the Portuguese mainland would be 'associated' with Allied Command Europe.

On 1 September 1999, the CINCIBERLANT command was upgraded to CINCSOUTHLANT, a NATO regional command with new terms of reference and a greater area of responsibility. The headquarters becomes Regional Headquarters South Atlantic (RHQ SOUTHLANT). On 12 June 2003, command authority for CINCSOUTHLANT was transferred from SACLANT to SACEUR, NATO's European command in Belgium.

On 4 December 2006, SACEUR rewarded Joint Command Lisbon with a Campaign Pennant to recognize the operational contribution during the Pakistan Earthquake Relief Operation.

In 2009 Joint Command Lisbon was responsible for providing assistance to the African Union on request, principally as regards airlift for the mission in Darfur; preparing staff to command the NATO Response Force; mounting a sea-based Combined Joint Task Force Headquarters; and support for cooperation and dialogue under the Partnership for Peace and Mediterranean Dialogue programmes.

During the 2000s (decade), the commander was a United States Navy vice admiral who simultaneously held the position of commander of United States Sixth Fleet and commander of Naval Striking and Support Forces NATO (STRIKFORNATO, the old STRIKFORSOUTH), both located in Naples, Italy. The admiral resided in Lisbon and commanded the three commands separated by the western Mediterranean through a rigorous travel schedule and electronic means, including frequent video teleconferences. Vice Admiral Bruce W. Clingan was the last U.S. commander to hold the three commands simultaneously.
