= Bruce W. Clingan =

United States Navy officer

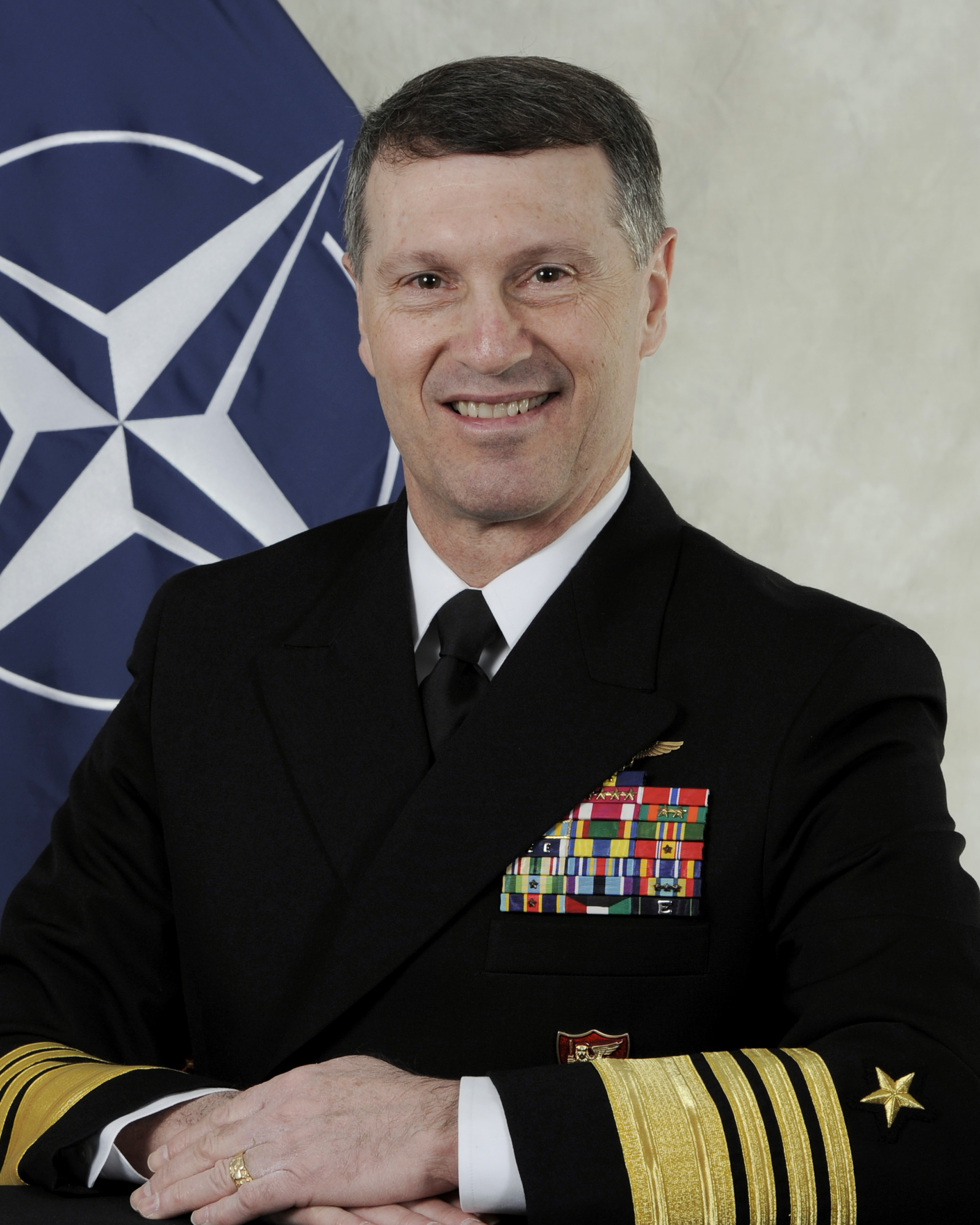
- Admiral Bruce W. Clingan
- Born: 1954 or 1955 (age 71–72); Lafayette, Indiana, U.S.
- Military career
- Allegiance: United States
- Branch: United States Navy
- Service years: 1977–2014
- Rank: Admiral
- Commands: Allied Joint Force Command Naples; United States Naval Forces Europe; United States Sixth Fleet; Carrier Strike Group 3 USS Carl Vinson (CVN-70); USS La Salle (AGF-3); VF-11
- Conflicts: Gulf War
- Awards: Defense Distinguished Service Medal; Navy Distinguished Service Medal (3); Defense Superior Service Medal (3); Legion of Merit (5); Bronze Star Medal

Bruce Waid Clingan (born c. 1955) is a retired United States Navy admiral who last served as Commander of United States Naval Forces Europe, United States Naval Forces Africa and Allied Joint Force Command Naples from February 24, 2012, to July 22, 2014. He previously served as Deputy Chief of Naval Operations for Operations, Plans and Strategy and Commander, United States Sixth Fleet, as well as Commander, Joint Command Lisbon from August 2008 to November 2009. He retired from the Navy in the fall of 2014 after over 37 years of service.

== Biography ==
Born in Lafayette, Indiana, he was raised in Bellevue, Washington. He is a graduate of the University of Washington and received a Master of Science degree from the University of Southern California. Being a member of the NROTC, he was commissioned to the U.S. Navy in June 1977.

Designated a naval aviator in May 1979, Clingan flew F-14 Tomcats with Fighter Squadron 124, Fighter Squadron 114, and Fighter Squadron 211, making deployments aboard USS America (CV-66), USS Enterprise (CVN-65), USS Kitty Hawk (CV-63), and USS Nimitz (CVN-68). He commanded Fighter Squadron 11, and after completing the nuclear power program, served as executive officer of USS Abraham Lincoln (CVN-72). Subsequently, he commanded the 6th Fleet flagship USS La Salle (AGF-3) and USS Carl Vinson (CVN-70).

Ashore, Clingan served as an F-14 flight instructor at Fighter Squadron 124, where he helped Naval Air Systems Command and Grumman Aerospace Corporation develop the F-14D Super Tomcat as a member of the Aircrew Systems Advisory Panel.

Clingan's first Joint assignment was in Europe, as a member of the Operations and Readiness Branch, Supreme Headquarters Allied Powers Europe, where he helped negotiate various North Atlantic Treaty Organization (NATO)/Spanish Coordination Agreements.

After selection to flag rank, Clingan joined United States Central Command, serving as deputy director of Operations from April 2002 to May 2004 during Operations Enduring Freedom and Iraqi Freedom. Clingan assumed command of Carrier Strike Group 3 / Carl Vinson Strike Group in June 2004 and served as CTF-50/152 during an extended deployment in support of Operation Iraqi Freedom in 2005. Subsequently, he joined the staff of the chief of Naval Operations in September 2005 as deputy director, Air Warfare Division (N78B), followed by assignments as director, Air Warfare Division (N88) and director, Warfare Integration/Senior National Representative (N8F). Following his tour on chief of Naval Operations staff, he assumed command of Joint Command Lisbon; commander, U.S. 6th Fleet; commander, Allied Joint Command Lisbon; commander, Striking and Support Forces NATO; deputy commander, U.S. Naval Forces Europe; deputy commander, U.S. Naval Forces Africa; and Joint Forces Maritime Component Commander, Europe.

Clingan began his current (as of 2012) tour of duty in December 2009 as deputy chief of Naval Operations for Operations, Plans and Strategy (N3/N5). He assumed his current position February 24, 2012.

== Awards and decorations ==

Naval Aviator Badge
Defense Distinguished Service Medal	Navy Distinguished Service Medal with two gold award stars	
Defense Superior Service Medal with two bronze oak leaf clusters	Legion of Merit w/ 4 award stars	Bronze Star Medal
Defense Meritorious Service Medal	Meritorious Service Medal	Navy and Marine Corps Achievement Medal w/ 2 award stars
Joint Meritorious Unit Award	Navy Unit Commendation	Navy Meritorious Unit Commendation
Navy E Ribbon (2 awards)	Navy Expeditionary Medal	National Defense Service Medal with one bronze service star
Southwest Asia Service Medal	Global War on Terrorism Expeditionary Medal	Global War on Terrorism Service Medal
Armed Forces Service Medal w/ service star	Humanitarian Service Medal	Navy Sea Service Deployment Ribbon w/ 3 service stars
Navy & Marine Corps Overseas Service Ribbon w/ service star	Kuwait Liberation Medal (Kuwait)	Navy Expert Pistol Shot Medal
Allied Joint Force Command Naples
