= List of University of West Florida people =

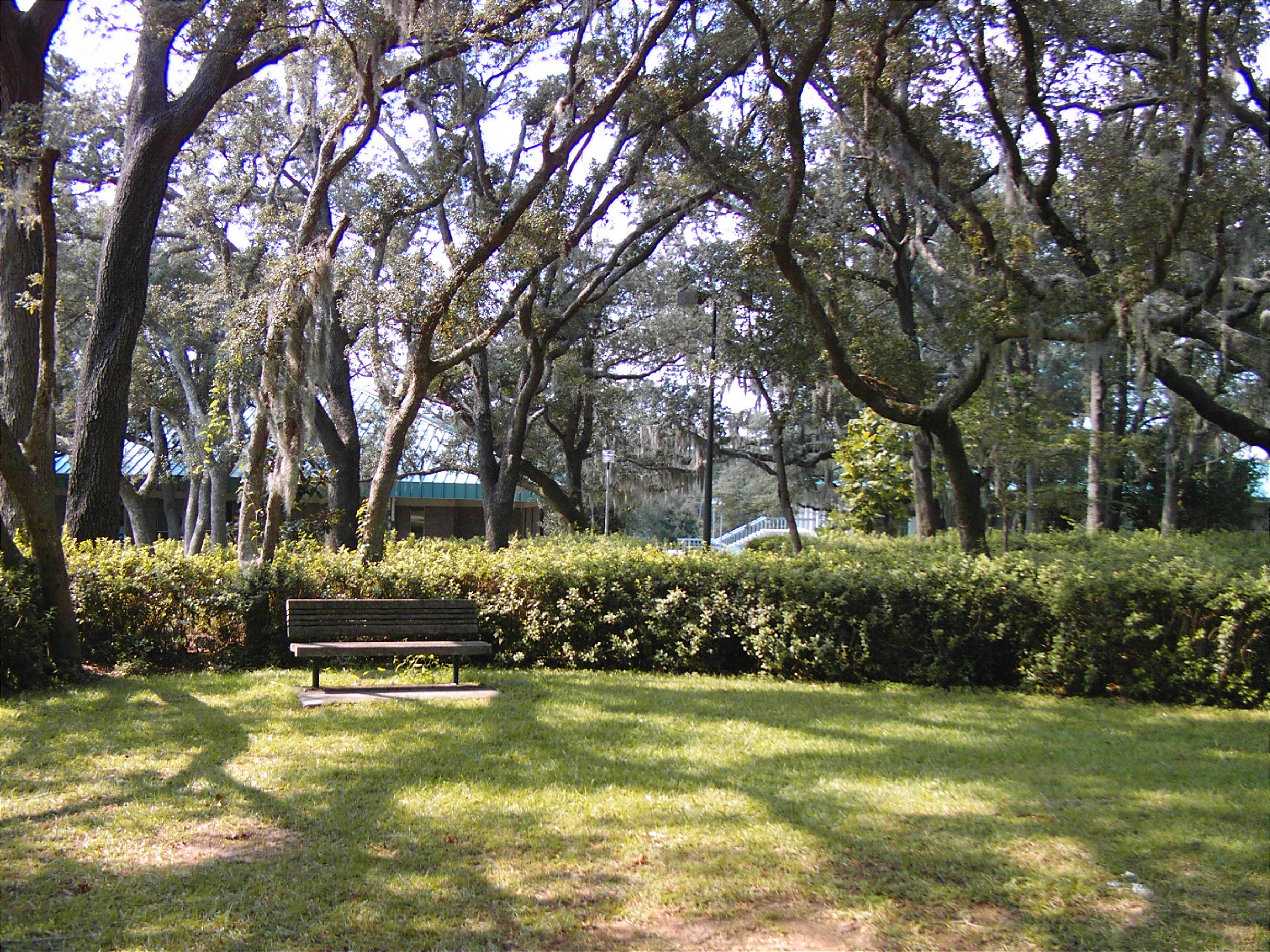
Foliage at UWF

The official list of notable alumni and faculty of the University of West Florida.

The University of West Florida, also known as West Florida and UWF, is a mid-sized public university located in Pensacola, Florida, United States. The university enrolled approximately 12,000 students as of the fall of 2009.

UWF is a member institution of the State University System of Florida. It is a doctoral/research university, specializing in engineering and the humanities. Its mascot is an Argonaut, and its logo is the chambered nautilus.

== Notable alumni ==
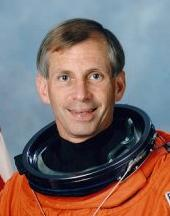
Kenneth Cockrell

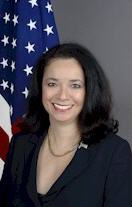
Carmen Maria Martinez

=== Academics ===
- Sarah Clemmons - President of Chipola College
- Frank L. Lewis – electrical engineer, academic and researcher; Endowed Chair and Emeritus Professor at the University of Texas at Arlington
- Larry Richards – professor emeritus at Indiana University East; founding chair of Engineering Management at Old Dominion University; former president of American Society for Cybernetics and American Society for Engineering Management
- Debra Street – professor of sociology at the University at Buffalo
- Robert P. Watson - professor, author, and political media commentator

=== Business ===
- Kenneth M. Ford – founder and CEO Emeritus of the Institute for Human & Machine Cognition (IHMC)
- Lee Moak – co-founder and CEO of Intrepid; former president of the Air Line Pilots Association (ALPA); former Governor of the U.S. Postal Service Board of Governors

=== Entertainment ===
- Michael DeMaria - musician, composer, Grammy-nominated recording artist
- Tanya Gallagher – singer-songwriter and environmentalist
- Namrata Singh Gujral - actress, producer, Americanizing Shelley; also Passions, The Agency
- David Hart - actor; most known for his role as Sgt. Parker Williams in In the Heat of the Night television series (1988–1995)
- Jan Hooks - actress and comedian; Saturday Night Live performer (attended; did not graduate)
- David Suhor – jazz musician, educator, and activist

=== Government ===
- David L. Brewer III - former superintendent of the Los Angeles Unified School District; retired Vice admiral, U.S. Navy
- Lacey Collier - senior status United States district judge, Northern District of Florida
- Chip Cravaack - former U.S. House of Representatives from Minnesota's 8th district
- Terry Halvorsen – former Department of Defense Chief Information Officer; former Department of the Navy Chief Information Officer
- Mike Hill - former member of the Florida House of Representatives
- Mike Jacobs - former Illinois state senator from the 36th district
- Anna Paulina Luna - member of the U.S. House of Representatives from Florida's 13th district
- John W. Bergman - member of the U.S. House of Representatives from Michigan's 1st district
- Carmen Maria Martinez - former U.S. ambassador to Zambia
- Jerry Maygarden - former member of the Florida House of Representatives
- Dave Murzin - former member of the Florida House of Representatives
- Curtis Richardson - former member of the Florida House of Representatives
- Margaret Catharine Rodgers - chief United States district judge, Northern District of Florida
- Michelle Salzman - member of the Florida House of Representatives from the 1st district
- Dixie Sansom – former member of the Florida House of Representatives
- Ray Sansom - former speaker of the Florida House of Representatives
- Lindsley Smith – former member of the Arkansas House of Representatives
- Jacqui Thurlow-Lippisch – former commissioner for the Town of Sewall's Point and member of the South Florida Water Management District governing board
- Jayer Williamson – former member of the Florida House of Representatives

=== Military, space, and aviation ===
- David Architzel - retired Vice admiral, U.S. Navy; former commander of the Naval Air Systems Command
- Jim Buchili - former NASA astronaut and Colonel, U.S. Marine Corps
- Kenneth Cockrell - former NASA astronaut, 9th Chief of the Astronaut Office and Captain, U.S. Navy
- James O. Ellis – retired Admiral, U.S. Navy and former commander of United States Strategic Command; former president and CEO of the Institute of Nuclear Power Operations
- Mark P. Fitzgerald - retired Admiral, U.S. Navy; former commander of United States Naval Forces Europe
- Charles H. Johnston - retired Rear admiral, U.S. Navy
- Robert D. McMurry Jr. – retired Lt. General, U.S. Air Force; executive vice president of Dayton Aerospace
- Bruce Melnick - former NASA astronaut and Commander, U.S. Coast Guard
- Bryan Daniel O'Connor - former NASA astronaut and Colonel, U.S. Marine Corps
- John L. Phillips - NASA astronaut and Captain, U.S. Navy
- William H. Plackett - 6th Master Chief Petty Officer of the Navy, U.S. Navy
- Richard N. Richards - former NASA astronaut and Captain, U.S. Navy
- Bill Wolverton – scientist; principal investigator of the NASA Clean Air Study

=== Other ===
- Kevin S. Brown - Bishop of Delaware of the Episcopal Church

=== Sports ===
Shane Greene

==== Baseball ====
- John Church – professional baseball pitcher
- Brian Ellington – former MLB pitcher
- Mark Ettles – former MLB pitcher
- Shane Greene – former MLB pitcher and All-Star
- John Webb – former MLB pitcher

==== Basketball ====
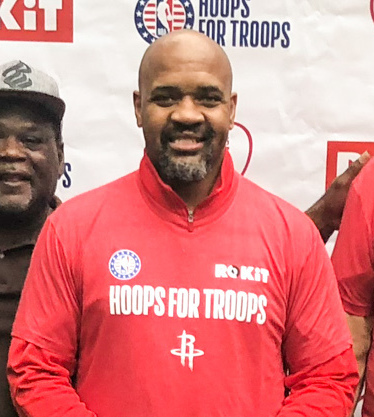
Moochie Norris

- Emanuele Montaguti – former professional basketball player
- Moochie Norris – former NBA player
- Reginald Warren – former professional basketball player

==== Football ====
- Michael Beaudry – former CFL quarterback; assistant coach for the University of Cincinnati
- D'Anthony Bell – former NFL safety
- Rodney Coates – former wide receiver
- Dee Dowis – former Air Force quarterback, 1989 WAC Offensive Player of the Year; (did not play at UWF, but later received his MBA from UWF)
- David Durden – former NFL wide receiver
- Matthew Gotel – former NFL nose tackle
- Peewee Jarrett – former NFL quarterback
- John Jiles – former NFL wide receiver
- Woody McCorvey – college football coach; Chief of Staff for Clemson (did not play at UWF, but received Master's at UWF)
- Kaleb Nobles – Head football coach for University of West Florida
- Austin Reed – former NFL quarterback

==== Soccer ====
- Keegan Ancelin – forward for Drogheda United
- Daniela Cruz - defender for the Costa Rica women's national football team
- Richard Dixon – coach for Chattanooga FC and former professional soccer player
- James Moore – head coach of the Nova Southeastern University women's soccer team and former professional soccer player
- Boniface Okafor – former professional soccer player
- Eduardo Oliveira – football coach and former professional player
- Sean Reynolds – assistant manager for St. Louis City 2 and former professional soccer player
- Jodi-Ann Robinson - midfielder, represented Canada at the 2008 Beijing summer Olympic
- Keith Savage - coach for the Tampa Bay Rowdies and former professional soccer player
- Marquel Waldron – defender for PHC Zebras and former Bermuda national football team international
- Jerry Wiltshire – defender for Hampton & Richmond Borough and British Virgin Islands national football team

==== Other sports ====
- Nicolás Barrientos – professional tennis player
- Stuart Manley – professional golfer

== Notable faculty ==
- Judith A. Bense - former university president, professor and chair of the Department of Anthropology; archaeologist of the Southeastern United States
