= Marquel =

Marquel is a given name. Notable people with the name include:

- Marquel Blackwell (born 1979), American football player and coach
- Marquel Fleetwood (born 1970), American football player
- Marquel Lee (born 1995), American football player
- Marquel Waldron (born 1988), Bermudian footballer
