= Donald M. White =

American Navy admiral (1915–1995)

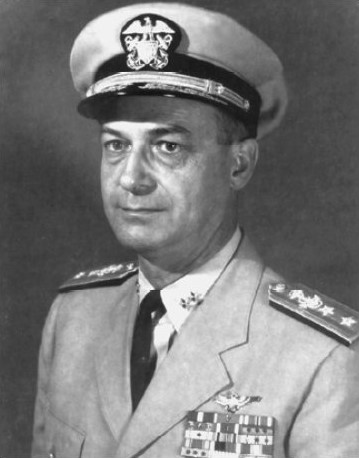
- Nickname: Don
- Born: 19 August 1915; Minneapolis, Minnesota
- Died: 10 September 1995 (aged 80) Pensacola, Florida
- Allegiance: United States of America
- Branch: United States Navy
- Service years: 1937–1970
- Rank: Rear Admiral
- Commands: Alaskan Sea Frontier; Carrier Division 20; USS Forrestal; USS Shasta; VT-9
- Conflicts: World War II; Korean War
- Awards: Navy Cross; Legion of Merit (2); Distinguished Flying Cross; Air Medal (4)

Donald Morison White (19 August 1915 – 10 September 1995) was a United States Navy rear admiral. A decorated veteran of World War II, he earned the Navy Cross and Distinguished Flying Cross as a torpedo bomber pilot and squadron commander in the Pacific theatre.

== Early life and education ==
White was born in Minneapolis, Minnesota and raised in Ossining, New York. He entered the United States Naval Academy in 1933 and graduated with a B.S. degree in June 1937. After completing flight training, he was designated a naval aviator in 1940. White later completed a naval warfare course at the Naval War College in 1956.

== Military career ==
White was at Pearl Harbor on 7 December 1941. He was subsequently assigned to torpedo bomber squadron VT-6 aboard USS Enterprise and participated in 1942 combat operations.

Before the end of 1942, White was reassigned as squadron commander of VT-9 aboard USS Essex. He was awarded the Navy Cross for his actions during a raid on Rabaul Harbor in November 1943 and the Distinguished Flying Cross for his actions at Truk Atoll in February 1944. Later in 1944, White was sent to the Naval Air Training Center in Pensacola, Florida.

From 1951 to 1953, White was assigned to NAS San Diego, becoming the operations officer in February 1951. From 1954 to 1955, he served as executive officer of the carrier USS Bennington. White was promoted to captain in July 1955.

From 1956 to 1958, White served as department head and professor of mathematics at the Naval Academy. From July 1958 to April 1959, he was given command of the ammunition ship USS Shasta. From June 1961 to June 1962, White was commanding officer of the carrier USS Forrestal.

In October 1964, White was promoted to rear admiral. Given command of Carrier Division 20, his flagship USS Intrepid retrieved the Gemini 3 astronauts and their spacecraft after their Atlantic splashdown in March 1965. Later that year, White shifted his flag to USS Lake Champlain.

From 1966 to 1969, White served as commander of the Alaskan Sea Frontier. His final assignment was as deputy director for inspection services in the office of the assistant secretary of defense for administration. He retired from active duty in July 1970.

== Personal ==
White married Ruth Rachel Koch (23 October 1914 – 19 October 1987) on 3 June 1939 at the Naval Training Station Chapel in San Diego, California. They had five sons, a daughter and, as of 1995, fifteen grandchildren.

After retirement, White lived in Pensacola, Florida. He died of cardiac arrest at Baptist Hospital there after abdominal surgery and was interred beside his wife at Barrancas National Cemetery on 15 September 1995.
