= David Suhor =

American jazz musician

David Anthony Suhor
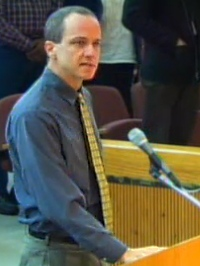
- Suhor delivering an invocation
- Born: April 29, 1968 (age 58); New Orleans, Louisiana
- Education: Florida State University University of West Florida
- Occupations: Jazz Musician and Teacher
- Employer: ShamaLamaGram
- Known for: Activist for separation of church and state as well as religious freedom

David Suhor is an American jazz musician and teacher living in Pensacola, Florida; he is the founder of a local business called ShamaLamaGram that delivers singing telegrams.

Suhor is also known for being a local activist for separation of church and state as well as religious freedom and equality. He is well known for his role as a plaintiff in the 2017 judgement to remove the Bayview park cross and also as a founder of a local chapter of The Satanic Temple.

== Music ==
David Suhor was originally from New Orleans Raised in Tallahassee. Suhor grew up in a large family being 9th of 11 children.

When he left home for college he moved to Pensacola where he attended Florida State University (FSU) where his musical pursuits took back seat to academic and employment requirements. For ten years Suhor worked in computer networking and teaching.

In 1994 Suhor met saxophonist Thom Botsford who introduced Suhor to jazz, together they formed a band which started Suhor on his career of performing professionally.

Suhor returned to college at University of West Florida (UWF) in 2001 to study jazz piano and music. Here he picked up trumpet as well as improving vocal technique.

Inspirations for his career change can be attributed to his father who was also a teacher and wrote the book Jazz in New Orleans - The Postwar Years Through 1970. Suhor has listed some of his musical inspirations as Lou Rawls, Harry Connick Jr, Tony Bennett, Joni Mitchell and Elton John.

Suhor worked as a church musician with the Unitarian Universalist Church of Pensacola then moved to be the soloist and music director for the Unity Church of Pensacola until 2012. He also helped in forming an ensemble called the Dixie Shticks and sung with the Pensacola Opera chorus. Other endeavors have included the Jazz Society of Pensacola.

Suhor currently resides in Pensacola, Florida, is a music teacher, jazz musician and also delivers singing telegrams with his company ShamaLamaGram.

Selected Musical Credits
Year	Venue / Location	Performance Details	Citation
2003	Pensacola Public Library	Dance in the stacks - David Suhor and the Superlatives	
2009	Pensacola multiple events	David Suhor and the Unity of Pensacola Soul and Spirit Singers	
2011	Jazz Extravaganza Benefit	Davis Suhor sings at fundraiser	
2012	Jazzfest Goes on	David Suhor sings at fund raiser	
2014	Jazz Gumbo Event	Thom Botson Group with David Suhor as special guest vocalist	
2014	Album - Snowed in with Winterfest	Performed in 5 out of 14 tracks on album	
2015	Literary Roundtable Magazine Unveiling	Performed in a Jazz Duo with Thom Botsford	
Current (2018)	Shamalamagram	Business providing singing telegrams	

== Other projects ==
In 1989 Suhor worked on the interior redesign of the Union Bank in Tallahassee, Florida (The States Oldest Bank)

"We're still doing research on how it might have been inside," Suhor said. "There might have been teller cages at one time That's something we d like to have if we find that to be the case."

Suhor undertook an art project called Homefronts: Pensacola where he photographed homes in the historic East Hill neighbourhood in Pensacola. Following the Deepwater Horizon Gulf oil spill in 2010, protests and boycotting of BP fuel threatened the closure of a local BP branded service station. Suhor dressed as Elvis Presley to raise awareness that the service station was locally owned and that boycotting it was hurting the local economy.

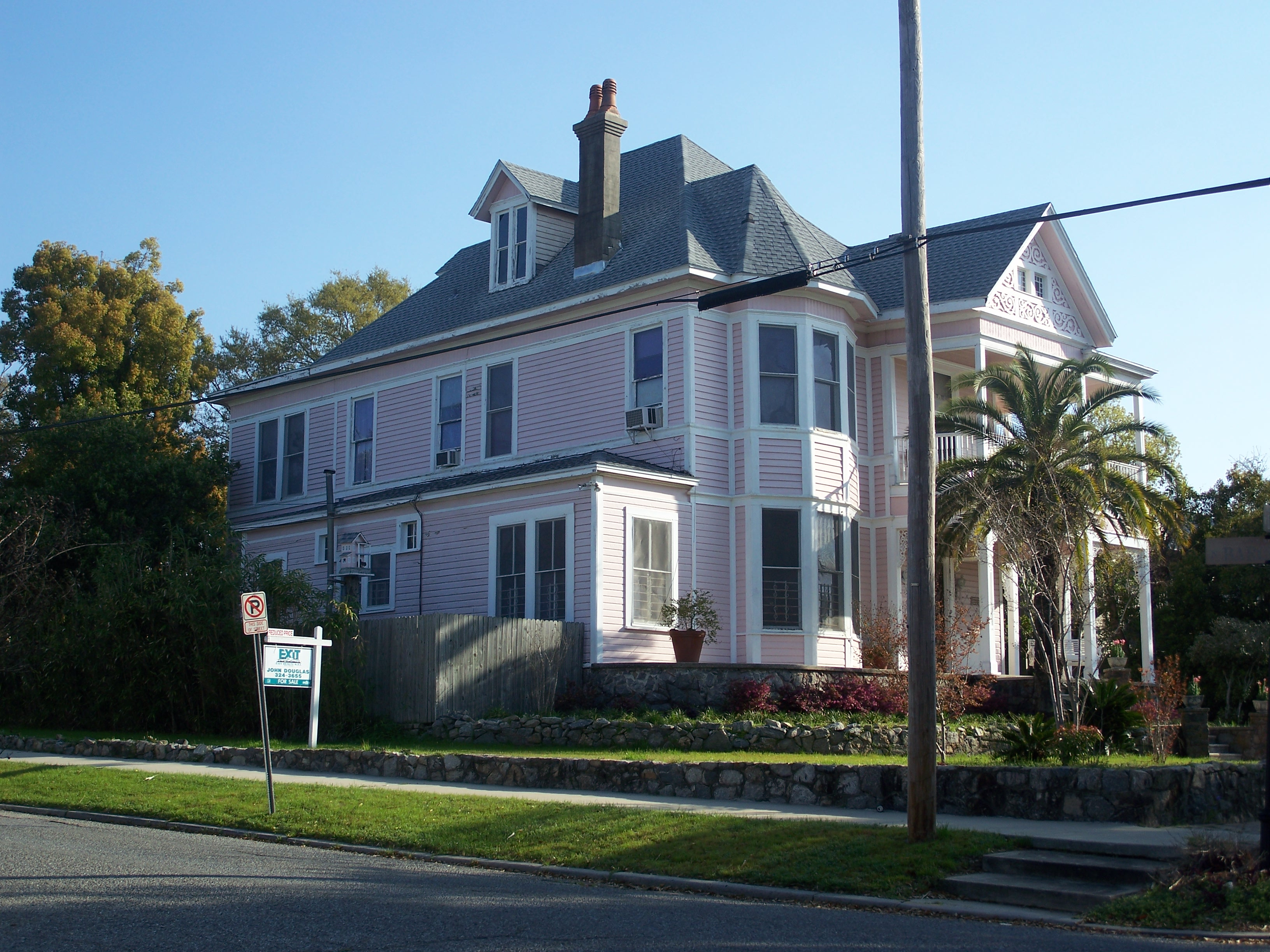
Historic house in Pensacola

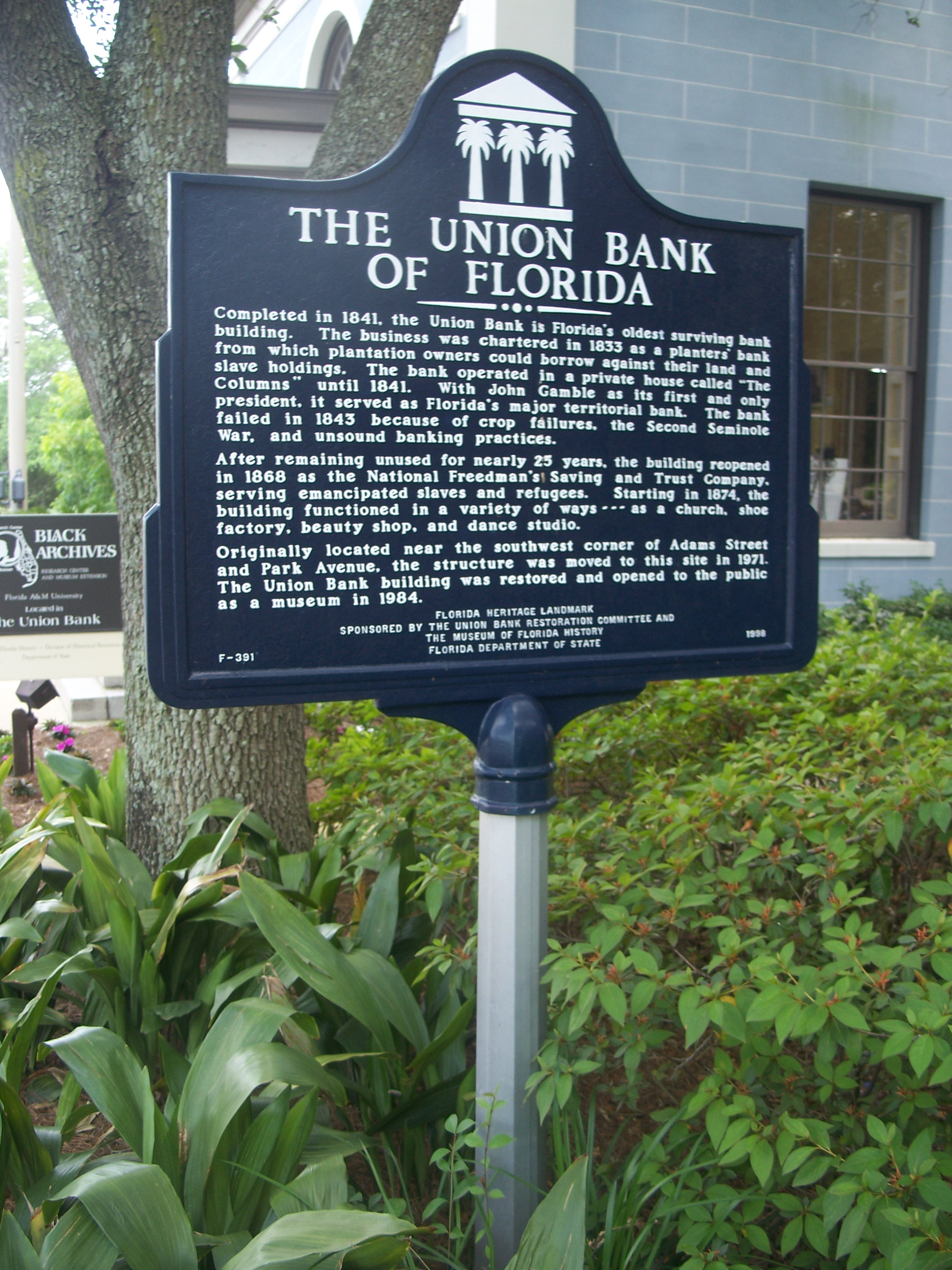
Union Bank plaque

== Activism ==
Suhor has become a prominent local activist in Florida, his areas of advocacy included:

- Separation of church and state including removing prayer and invocations from government functions
- Free speech
- Removing religious symbols from public spaces
- Religious equality

Suhor has used a number of tactics in his activism including founding a chapter of The Satanic Temple in Northwest Florida. Some of the protests that Suhor has been involved in include:

- 2012 Escambia County Commission, Florida: Suhor used his credentials a Christian musician to be added to the roster to deliver the invocation before the meeting was called to order. The invocation delivered was pantheistic including reference to many deities.
- 2014 Escambia School Board, Florida: Suhor spoke before the board advocating religious equality for all minority religions. The suggestion put before board was replacing the invocation with a moment of silence.
- 2015 Okaloosa School Board pre-meeting prayer: Suhor attempted to give the invocation but was drowned out by other attendees singing Christian hymns.

2016 Pensacola City Council July 14: Suhor delivered a Satanic invocation before the opening of the meeting to much contention that included Pensacola Police escorting people out of the building. The text of the invocation was originally written by Lucien Greaves, co-founder of The Satanic Temple. Council President Charles Bare gaveled the meeting into session. But as Suhor, in a black hooded robe, prepared to give the invocation, members of the gallery began drowning him out with Christian prayers.

2015-2017 Bayview Park Cross: Suhor, along with other plaintiffs, was represented by American Humanist Association (AHA) in a court action to have the Bayview park cross taken down. In a ruling handed down by U.S. District Judge Roger Vinson the city of Pensacola was given 30 days to remove the cross from the park.

"After about 75 years, the Bayview Cross can no longer stand as a permanent fixture on city-owned property,” Vinson wrote in the ruling. "I am aware that there is a lot of support in Pensacola to keep the cross as is, and I understand and respect that point of view,” said the judge, who was appointed by former President Ronald Reagan. “But, the law is the law.”

Pensacola subsequently appealed that ruling to the Eleventh Circuit Court of Appeals and ultimately to the United States Supreme Court. While the city's petition was pending, the Supreme Court decided American Legion v. American Humanist Association, holding that a 32-foot Latin cross on public land in Bladensburg, Maryland does not violate the Establishment Clause. The Supreme Court then sent the Bayview Park Cross back to the Eleventh Circuit and the decision was reversed. The Court allowed the cross because "[h]aving reconsidered the case in light of American Legion, we conclude, as the Supreme Court did there, that 'the Cross does not offend the Constitution.'"

2017 Emerald Coast Utilities Authority (ECUA) Headquarters: Suhor was removed from the premises for being disruptive and protesting the inclusion of prayer before the meeting started. Suhor claimed it violated separation of church and state whilst ECUA representatives claimed that this prayer was constitutional.

2018 ECUA Headquarters: Suhor was arrested for trespass and passive resistance on 22 February. The arresting officer's reason for the arrest was stated as

I observed RP/Lois Benson advising S/Suhor to please stop disrupting the meeting. ...RP/Benson asked S/Suhor many times to please stop disrupting their meeting by talking over their prayer, and he chose to continue

In April 2019, Suhor was acquitted of the charges of trespassing and resisting arrest at the ECUA Headquarters, saying

I feel good that we won, I feel that it's absolutely ridiculous that it got to this point. I have video proof that [ECUA chairwoman] Lois Benson lied under oath, and she knew it, saw I had the proof and didn't even bother to recant.

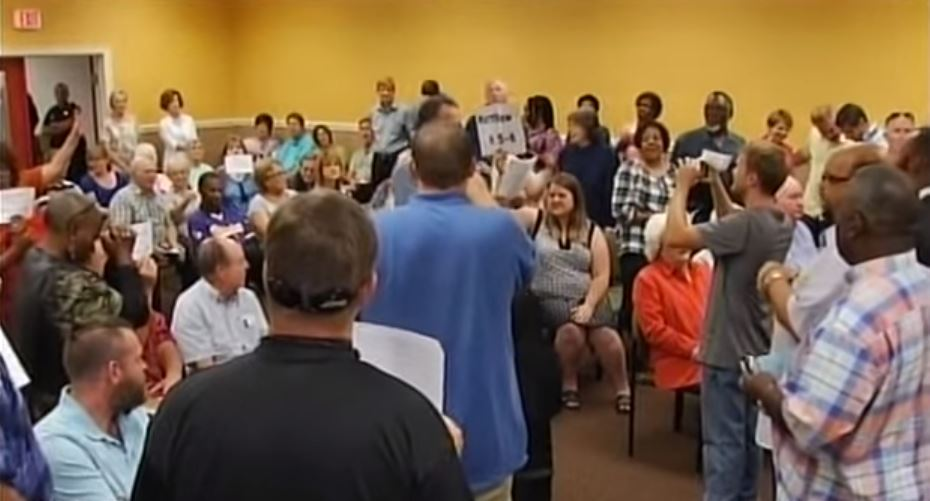
David Suhor at the Okaloosa County School Board Prayer

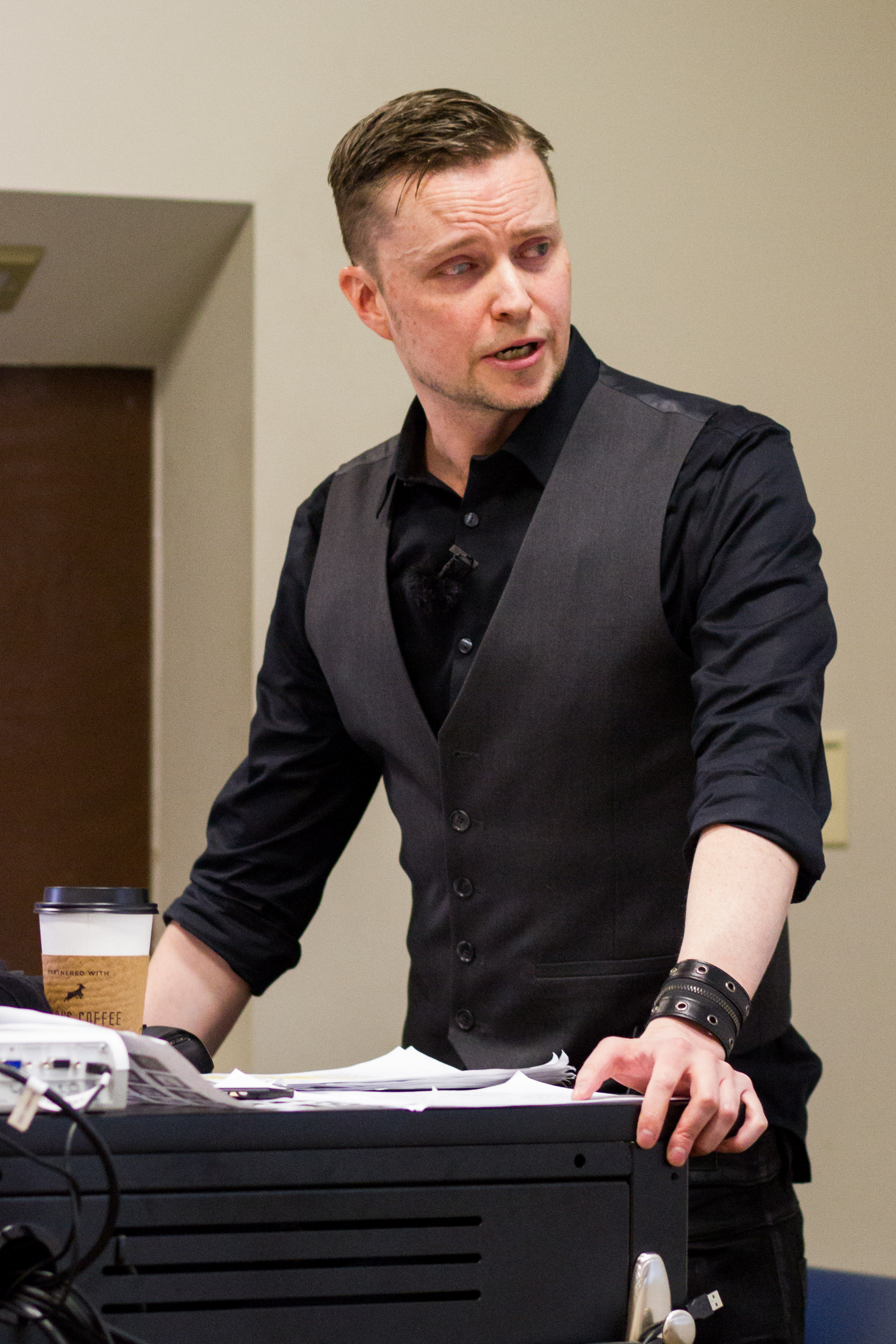
Lucien Greaves, co-founder of The Satanic Temple

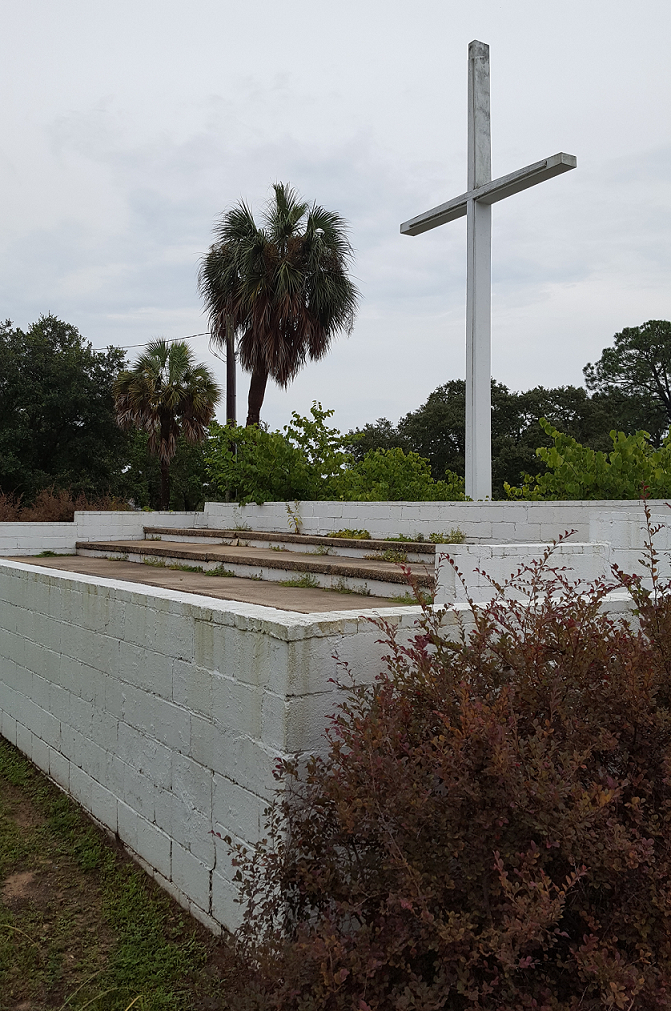
Bayview Cross in Pensacola, Florida before it was taken down

== See also ==
- Separation of church and state in the United States
