= Mark P. Fitzgerald =

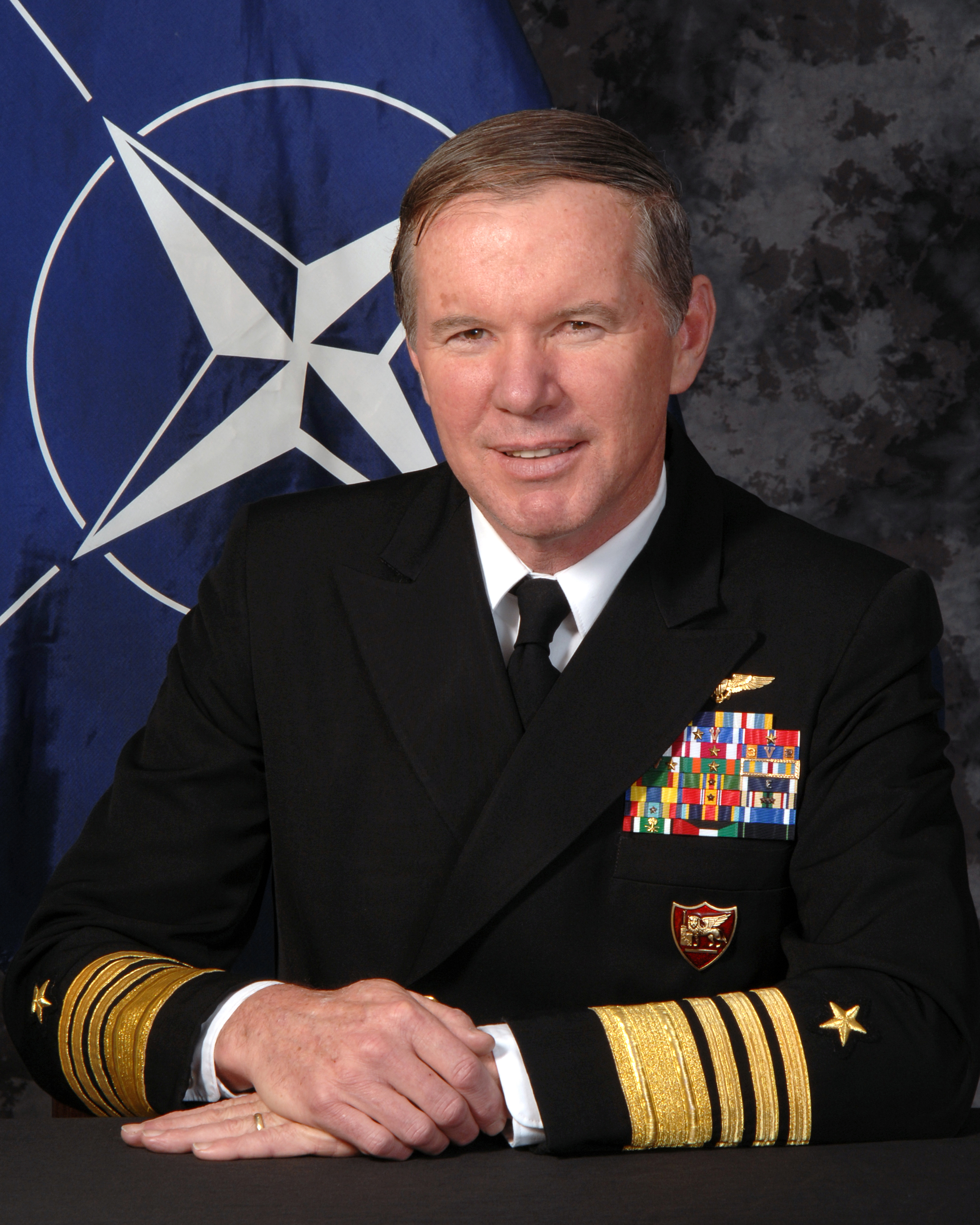
- Admiral Mark P. Fitzgerald
- Born: 1951 (age 74–75); Winchester, Massachusetts, U.S.
- Military career
- Allegiance: United States
- Branch: United States Navy
- Service years: 1973–2010
- Rank: Admiral
- Commands: United States Naval Forces Europe; Allied Joint Force Command Naples; United States Second Fleet; Carrier Group Eight; Carrier Air Wing 14; VA-46
- Conflicts: Gulf War
- Awards: Defense Distinguished Service Medal; Navy Distinguished Service Medal (2); Defense Superior Service Medal; Legion of Merit (4); Distinguished Flying Cross with Combat V (2); Bronze Star Medal (2)

Mark P. Fitzgerald (born 1951) is a retired United States Navy admiral. He is the former Commander, United States Naval Forces Europe – Commander, United States Naval Forces Africa and Commander, Allied Joint Force Command Naples. He previously served as Director, Navy Staff from December 2006 to November 2007 and Commander, United States Second Fleet from 2004 until December 2006. He assumed the duties of Commander, United States Naval Forces Europe and Commander, Allied Joint Force Command Naples on November 30, 2007 and assumed the additional duties as Commander, United States Naval Forces Africa on March 26, 2009.

== Early life ==
Fitzgerald was born in Winchester, Massachusetts, and graduated from Northeastern University, where he was a member of the Army ROTC program, in June 1973. He was designated a Naval Aviator in October 1975.

== Naval career ==
Fitzgerald flew the A-7E Corsair II with now retired Rear Admiral Bert Johnston during sea assignments in VA-195 (1976–79), Carrier Air Wing 17 (1982–84), and VA-105 (1985–88) embarked in USS Kitty Hawk (CV-63), USS America (CV-66), and USS Forrestal (CV-59). He commanded the VA-46 "Clansmen" (1990–1991) in USS John F. Kennedy (CV-67), deploying with four days notice for Operation Desert Shield. He led the first Navy strike on Baghdad during the opening hour of Operation Desert Storm.

During his career, Fitzgerald was assigned as Deputy Commander, Joint Air Force Component Commander for Provide Promise Yugoslav Operations and Assistant Commander for Deny Flight NATO operations (1993). He assumed command of Carrier Air Wing 14 (1994–95) while deployed to the Persian Gulf in USS Carl Vinson (CVN-70) supporting Operation Southern Watch. Fitzgerald's shore tours include VA-174 Landing Signal Officer (1979–82), Naval Maritime Intelligence Center, SPEAR (1991–92), and Executive Assistant to the Supreme Allied Commander, Europe (1996–98). He holds a master's degree in Aeronautical Systems Engineering from the University of West Florida (1975) and attended the Naval War College (1983–84).

Selected for flag rank in September 1998, Fitzgerald's first flag assignment was Deputy Commander, United States Naval Forces Central Command and commanded Joint Task Force Determined Response in Aden, Yemen (2000) in response to the terrorist attack on the guided-missile destroyer USS Cole (DDG-67). Assuming command of Carrier Group Eight (2001), he led the Theodore Roosevelt Battle Group during Operation Enduring Freedom (2001–2002). He served as Director, Air Warfare and then as Director, Naval Warfare (2003–2004). He then assumed the position of Commander, United States Second Fleet/Commander, Striking Fleet Atlantic in October 2004.

Fitzgerald was relieved as commander of USNAVEUR, USNAVAF & JFC Naples by Admiral Samuel J. Locklear on October 6, 2010.

== Awards and decorations ==

Naval Aviator Badge
Defense Distinguished Service Medal	Navy Distinguished Service Medal with one gold award star	Defense Superior Service Medal
Legion of Merit with three award stars	Distinguished Flying Cross with Combat V and award star	Bronze Star with award star
Defense Meritorious Service Medal with one bronze oak leaf cluster	Meritorious Service Medal with award star	Air Medal with Combat V, gold award numeral 3 and bronze Strike/flight numeral 2
Navy and Marine Corps Commendation Medal with Combat V and two award stars	Navy and Marine Corps Achievement Medal	Joint Meritorious Unit Award
Navy Unit Commendation	Navy Meritorious Unit Commendation with one bronze service star	Navy E Ribbon
Navy Expeditionary Medal	National Defense Service Medal with two service stars	Southwest Asia Service Medal with two service stars
Navy Sea Service Deployment Ribbon with silver service star	Navy & Marine Corps Overseas Service Ribbon	NATO Medal for the former Yugoslavia
Kuwait Liberation Medal from Saudi Arabia	Kuwait Liberation Medal from Kuwait	Navy Pistol Marksmanship Ribbon
Allied Joint Force Command Naples

He has logged over 4800 flight hours and has made over 1100 carrier arrested landings from the decks of thirteen aircraft carriers.
