= Charles H. Johnston =

United States Navy admiral

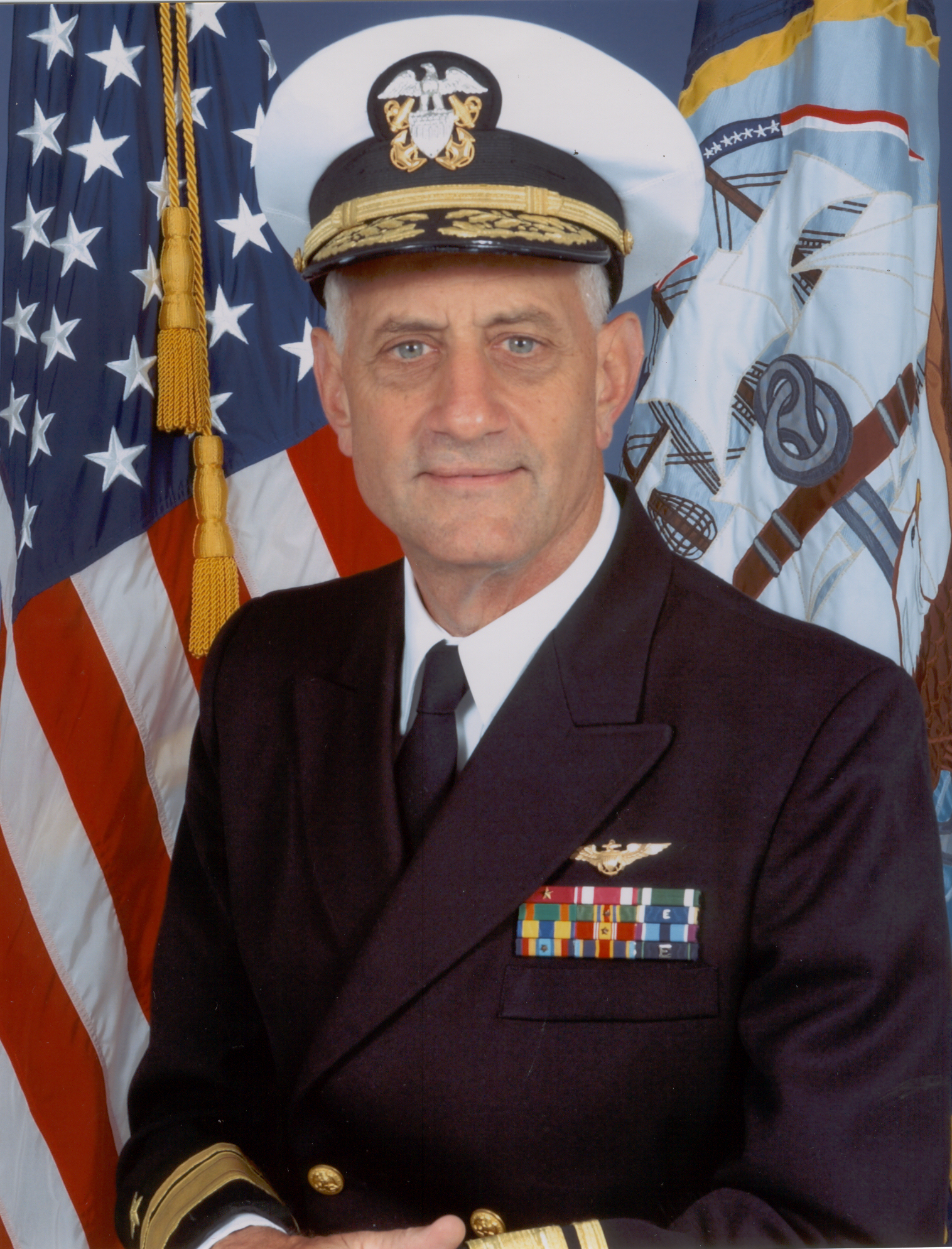
- Rear Admiral Bert Johnston
- Born: 1948 (age 77–78)
- Military career
- Allegiance: United States of America
- Branch: United States Navy
- Service years: 1973–2005
- Rank: Rear Admiral (Upper Half)
- Nickname: Bert
- Awards: Legion of Merit
- Other work: Vice President, Wyle Laboratories, Inc

Rear Admiral (Upper Half) Charles Herbert Johnston Jr. (born 1948), known as Bert Johnston, was a United States Navy officer. He was appointed Vice Commander of the Naval Air Systems Command, (NAVAIR) at NAS Patuxent River, Maryland in December 2001.

== Biography ==
Johnston grew up in Memphis, Tennessee, and attended Memphis University School. He received a Bachelor of Science degree in aerospace engineering from Mississippi State University.

Johnston entered the navy through the Aviation Officer Candidate Program and was commissioned in October 1973. He received a Master of Science degree in aeronautical systems from the University of West Florida while earning his naval aviator wings in 1975. He served in Attack Squadron 15 aboard USS America, flying the A-7E Corsair with Adm Mark P. Fitzgerald. He next reported to Attack Squadron 174 as an instructor pilot and weapons training officer.

In 1981 he was accepted as an aerospace engineering duty officer. His subsequent sea duty was in the Air Department, USS Forrestal. Johnston next studied at the Naval Postgraduate School, Monterey, where he received a Master of Science degree in aeronautical engineering (avionics). After graduating from the U.S. Naval Test Pilot School in 1986 he served as F/A-18 project director, Ordnance Branch head, and chief test pilot, Systems Engineering Test Directorate at the Naval Air Test Center.

In 1989 he reported to the Naval Plant Representative Office Melbourne, Australia, as the executive officer and later served as commanding officer. From 1992 to 1995 he served in the F/A-18 Program Office, under the program executive officer, Tactical Aircraft Program (PEO TAC), as deputy for production and systems development. He next served as the military director for systems engineering and later as the director of engineering for the Naval Air Warfare Center Aircraft Division.

In August 1996, Johnston became Program Manager for Conventional Strike Weapons under the PEO TAC. His promotion to Rear Admiral (Lower Half) was approved by the Senate in June 1999. While serving as head of the Naval Air Warfare Center Weapons Division, he was promoted in early March 2000. His further promotion to Rear Admiral (Upper Half) was submitted to the Senate for approval in May 2001 and authorized in April 2002.

Johnston has flown in excess of 3,000 flight hours in more than 30 models of fixed and rotary wing aircraft. His honors include the Navy Meritorious Service Medal, the Legion of Merit, the Navy Commendation Medal, a Navy Achievement Medal and nine unit commendation and campaign awards.

Adm. Johnston's wife is Beverly, they have two children. He retired on April 8, 2005, at NAS Patuxent River.

In September 2005, Johnston became a vice president at Wyle Laboratories, Inc. In January 2019, he became President of the board of directors for The Patuxent Partnership.
