= Debra Street =

American sociologist

Debra Anne Street is an American sociologist specialized in health and income security, long-term care, aging in families, and comparative public policies. She is a professor of sociology at the University at Buffalo.

Street completed a B.A. at the University of West Florida (1990) and an M.S. (1992) and Ph.D. (1996) from Florida State University. She was a Robert Wood Johnson Fellow in health policy research at the University of Michigan from 1996 to 1998.

From 1998 to 2000, Street was an assistant professor in the department of sociology and anthropology at Purdue University. She was then a research scientist at the Pepper Institute on Aging and Public Policy within the Florida State University College of Social Sciences from 2001 to 2004. Street joined the faculty at the University at Buffalo in 2004 and was promoted to professor in 2011. In 2006, Street became an elected member of the National Academy of Social Insurance. She became a fellow of the Gerontological Society of America in 2008.
