= Pensacola Police Department =

Law enforcement agencies in Florida, U.S.

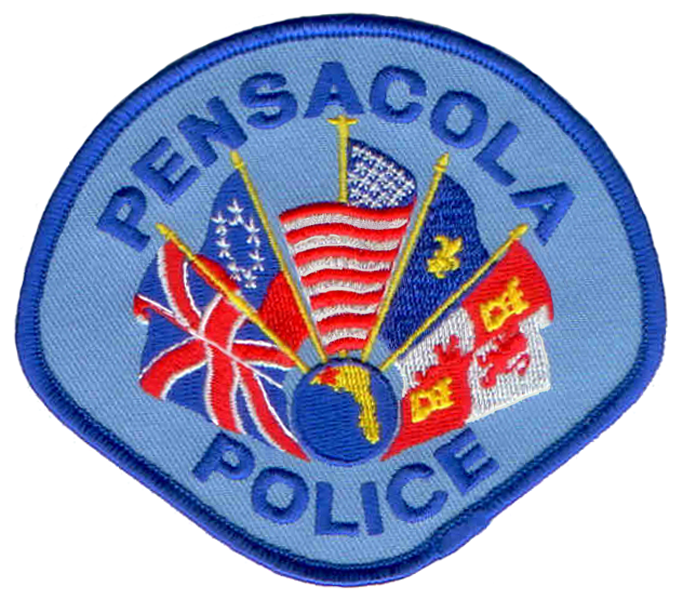

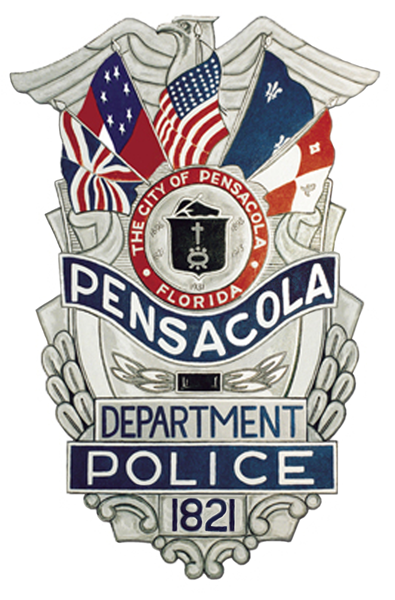
- Abbreviation: PPD
- Motto: Courtesy, Integrity, Professionalism

Agency overview
- Formed: July 19, 1821

Jurisdictional structure
- Operations jurisdiction: Pensacola, Florida, USA
- Map of Pensacola Police Department's jurisdiction
- Area: 40.76 sq mi (105.57 km2)
- Population: 52,713
- Legal jurisdiction: Pensacola, Florida
- General nature: Local civilian police

Operational structure
- Headquarters: 711 North Hayne Street; Pensacola, FL 32501
- Sworn members: 155
- Mayor of Pensacola responsible: D. C. Reeves
- Agency executives: Eric Randall, Chief of police; Kevin Christman, Deputy Police Chief; James C. Reese Jr., Captain of Operational Support Division; Kristin Brown, Captain of Uniform Patrol Division; Chuck Mallett, Captain of Criminal Investigation Division

Notables
- Anniversary: February 14, 1821

Website
- Official website

The Pensacola Police Department (or PPD) is the primary law enforcement agency for Pensacola, Florida in the United States.

== History ==
=== Early history ===
The department was founded on July 19, 1821, by Gen. Andrew Jackson, who had appointed city constable (policeman) to keep order within the city. On July 17, Jackson had entered Pensacola to accept the territory of East and West Florida for the United States. The following day, he established the government within the city. The history of the Pensacola Police Department goes back to the finding of Pensacola led by Tristan De Luna. When De Luna was establishing Pensacola with more than a 1,500 people they needed protection from future invaders and any other possible threats, so they built Fort Barrancas. The establishment did not last long because of the hurricanes that hit the area. Many tried to re-establish what was the settlement of De Luna. In 1692 Admiral Andre de Pez claimed the area that was known by the Native Americans as Panzacola. The Spanish fought for this area and was claimed by the Spanish, French, and English (all in separate times of history). Later on Fort Pickens and Fort San Miguel was established.

== Canine unit ==
The Pensacola Police Department is recognized as having one of the best-trained canine units in the United States. At the annual USPCA Police Dog Field Trials—the largest competition of police dogs in the United States—Pensacola police dog "Uno" took second place in the 2013 competition, and "Charief" took fourth place in 2012.

== Leadership and ranks ==
The current chief of police is Eric Randall. The head of the department is the chief of police. The current chief of police, Eric Randall, assumed the role on June 14, 2021, and prior to being hired in Pensacola, Chief Randall was the assistant chief of police at Newport News, Virginia, Police Department.

The previous chief of police, Tommi Lyter, retired from the department after serving with the Pensacola Police Department for 30 years. Retired chief of police Tommi Lyter took over the roll of chief deputy for Escambia County Sheriff's Office on January 5, 2021.

=== Rank structure ===
The Rank Structure of the Pensacola Police Department is as follows:

Title	Insignia
Chief of police	
Deputy Chief	
Lieutenant	
Captain	
Sergeant	
Police Officer	
Probationary Police Officer	
