= Marquel Waldron =

Bermudian footballer (born 1988)

Personal information
- Date of birth: 1 February 1988 (age 38)
- Place of birth: Warwick, Bermuda
- Position: Defender

Team information
- Current team: PHC Zebras

Youth career
- 2007: Saltus Grammar School
- 2008–2011: West Florida Argonauts

Senior career*
Years	Team	Apps	(Gls)
2010–2011	Bermuda Hogges	21	(0)
2012	Panama City Beach Pirates	15	(0)
2009–	PHC Zebras		

International career^{‡}
- Bermuda U20
- Bermuda U23
2007–2008	Bermuda	6	(0)
- * Club domestic league appearances and goals as of 19 May 2012 ‡ National team caps and goals as of 22 December 2010

Marquel Waldron (born 1 February 1988) is a Bermudian international footballer who plays club football for the PHC Zebras, as a defender.

== Club career ==
Waldron played for local league side PHC Zebras before joining the University of West Florida in summer 2008. He later played for Bermuda Hogges in the USL Second Division.

In October 2012, he had a trial with English side Barnet.

== International career ==
He made his debut for Bermuda in a December 2007 friendly match against Saint Kitts and Nevis and earned a total of 6 caps, scoring no goals. He has represented his country in 1 FIFA World Cup qualification match. He also was captain of Bermuda U-20.

== Personal life ==
Waldron has his own entertainment activity business, called Xtreme Sports.
