= USS Forrestal =

Forrestal-class aircraft carrier (1955–1993)

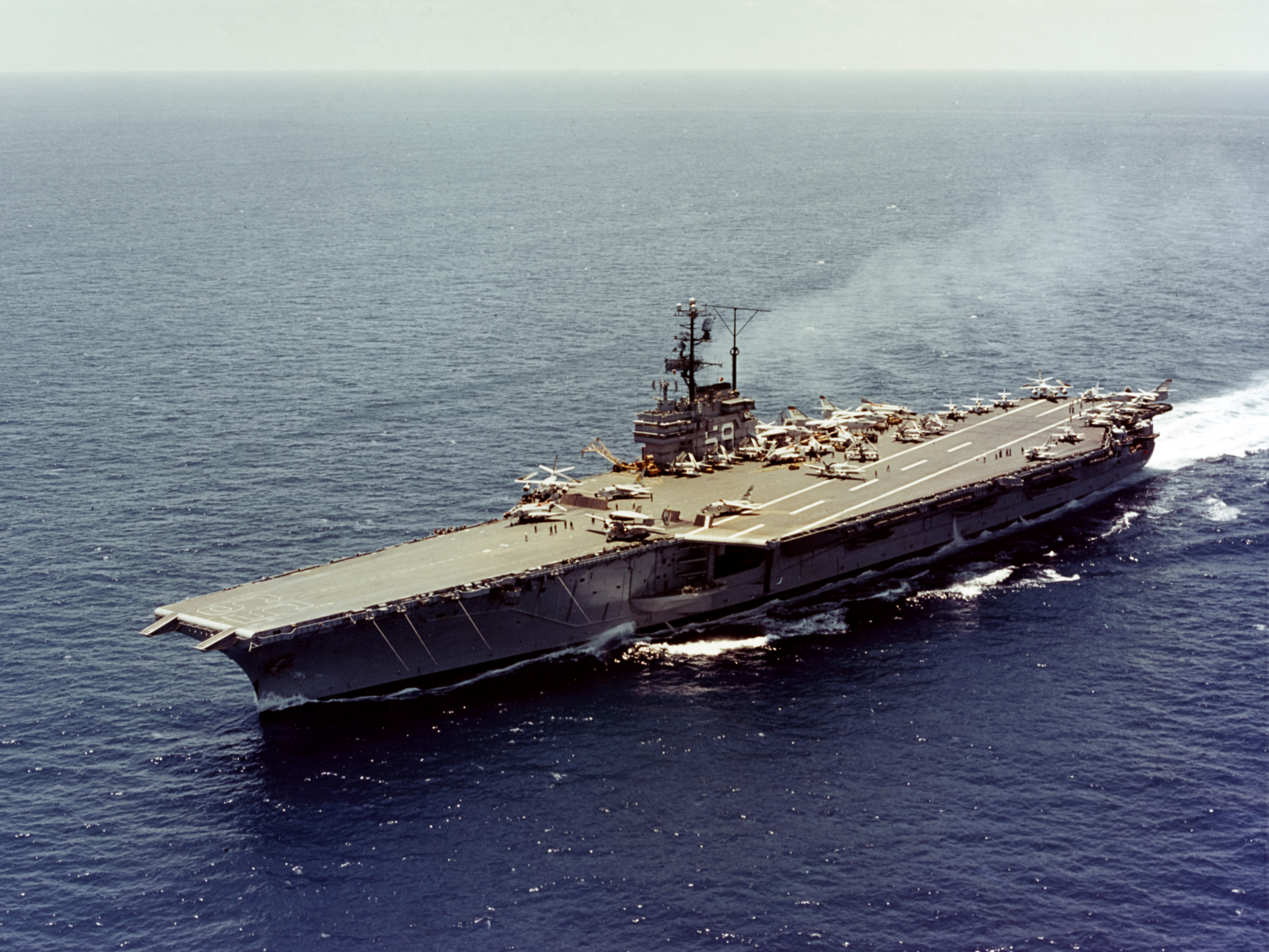
- USS Forrestal on 31 May 1962

History

United States
- Name: Forrestal
- Namesake: James Forrestal
- Ordered: 12 July 1951
- Builder: Newport News Shipbuilding
- Cost: US$217 million
- Laid down: 14 July 1952
- Launched: 11 December 1954
- Acquired: 29 September 1955
- Commissioned: 1 October 1955
- Decommissioned: 11 September 1993
- Reclassified: CVA-59, 1 Oct 1952; CV-59, 30 June 1975; AVT-59, 4 February 1992
- Stricken: 11 September 1993
- Identification: Callsign: NJVF; Hull number: CVB-59
- Motto: First in Defense
- Nickname(s): The FID / FID (most common); (First In Defense or; Fidelity Integrity Dignity)
- Fate: Scrapped, 15 December 2015
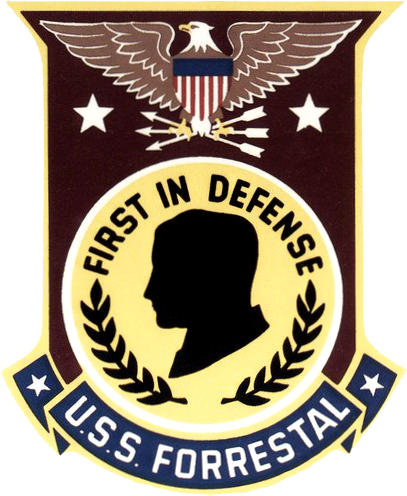
- Badge

General characteristics
- Class & type: Forrestal-class aircraft carrier
- Displacement: 59,650 long tons (60,610 t) standard; 81,101 long tons (82,402 t) full load
- Length: 990 ft (300 m) at waterline; 1,067 ft (325 m) overall
- Beam: 129 ft 4 in (39.42 m) at waterline; 238 ft (73 m) extreme width
- Draft: 37 ft (11 m)
- Propulsion: 4 Westinghouse geared Steam turbines, 8 Babcock & Wilcox boilers, 4 shafts; 260,000 shp (190 MW)
- Speed: 33 knots (61 km/h; 38 mph)
- Complement: 552 officers, 4,988 enlisted
- Armament: 8 × 5"/54 Mk 42 guns (removed); Mk 29 NATO Sea Sparrow, Mk 15 Phalanx CIWS
- Armor: Belt: 6 in (152 mm); Flight deck: 3 in (76 mm); Torpedo Bulkheads: 3 in (76 mm)
- Aircraft carried: approx. 85 aircraft (F-14, F-4, A-4, A-5, A-6, A-7, E-2, S-3B, EA-6B, C-2, SH-3, A-3B, KC-130 (test flight))

USS Forrestal (CVA-59) (later CV-59, then AVT-59) was a supercarrier named after the first United States Secretary of Defense James Forrestal. Commissioned in 1955, she was the United States' first completed supercarrier, and was the lead ship of her class. The other carriers of her class were USS Saratoga, USS Ranger and USS Independence. She surpassed the World War II Japanese carrier Shinano as the largest carrier yet built, and was the first designed to support jet aircraft.

The ship was affectionately called "The FID", because her namesake was the first Secretary of Defense, FID standing for "First In Defense". This is also the slogan on the ship's insignia and patch. She was also informally known in the fleet as the "USS Zippo" and "Forrest Fire" or "Firestal" because of a number of highly publicized fires on board, most notably a 1967 fire in which 134 sailors died and 161 more were injured.

Forrestal served for nearly four decades in the Atlantic, Mediterranean, and Pacific. She was decommissioned in 1993, and made available as a museum. Attempts to save her were unsuccessful, and in February 2014 she was towed to Brownsville, Texas, to be scrapped. Scrapping was completed in December 2015.

== Construction and commissioning ==
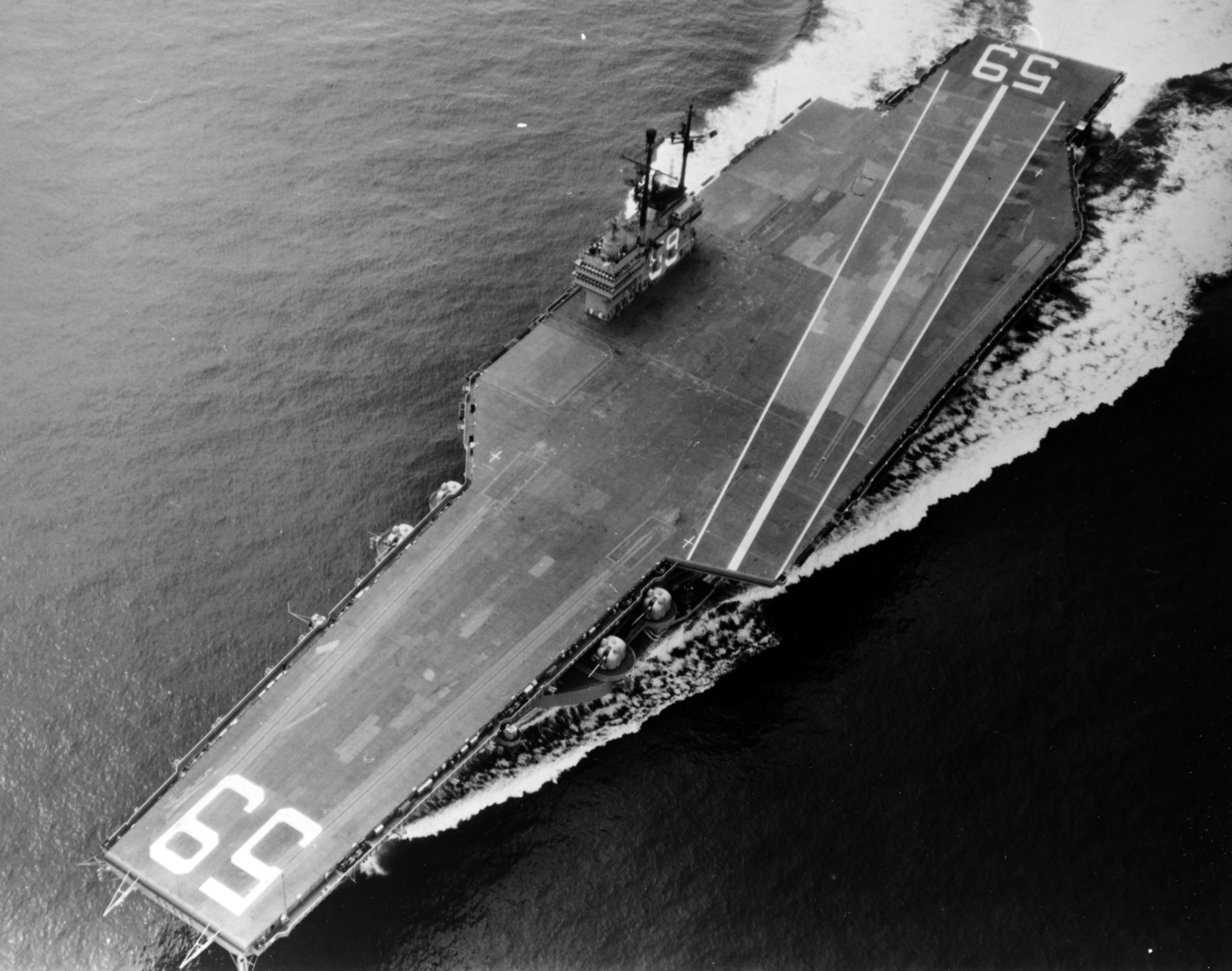
Forrestal undergoing sea trials, 29 September 1955.

Forrestal's keel was laid down at Newport News Shipbuilding on 14 July 1952. During construction, her design was adjusted several times—the original telescoping bridge, a design left over from the canceled USS United States, was replaced by a conventional island structure, and her flight deck was modified to include an angled landing deck and steam catapults, drawing on British innovations. She was launched on 11 December 1954, and commissioned into service on 1 October 1955, with Captain Roy L. Johnson in command.

== Design features ==
Forrestal was the first American aircraft carrier to be constructed with an angled flight deck, steam catapult, and an optical landing system, as opposed to having them installed after launching.

The original design—USS United States—provided for the island to retract flush with the deck during flight operations, but that was found to be too complicated. Another solution was considered where the two masts were to fold down, in lieu of the retractable island, to allow the carrier to pass under the Brooklyn Bridge. The larger center mast was to fold to the side and rest on the flight deck, and the smaller mast was to fold toward the stern.

== 1956–1962 ==
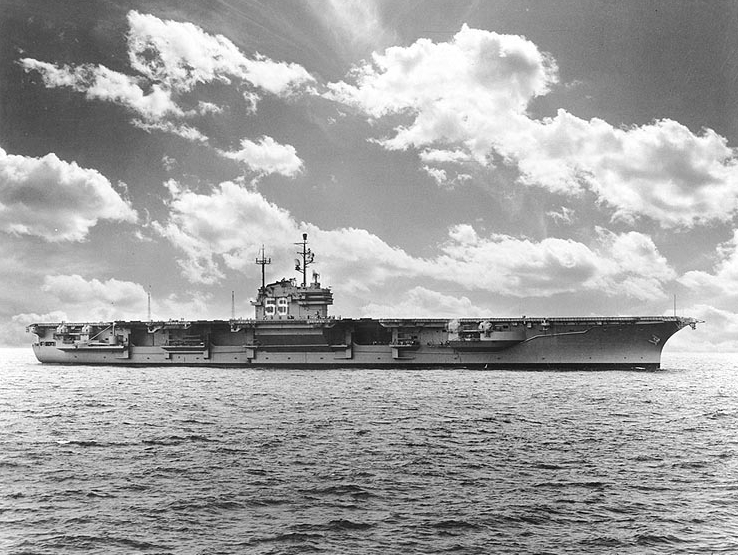
Forrestal in 1955, shortly after commissioning.

From her home port, Naval Station Norfolk, Norfolk, Virginia, Forrestal spent the first year of service in intensive training operations off the Virginia Capes and in the Caribbean. In May 1956, Captain Johnson was relieved by Captain William Edward Ellis. An important assignment was training aviators in the use of her advanced facilities. During this time she often operated out of Naval Station Mayport, Florida. On 7 November 1956, she put to sea from Mayport to operate in the eastern Atlantic during the Suez Crisis, ready to enter the Mediterranean Sea should it be necessary. She returned to Norfolk on 12 December to prepare for her first deployment with the 6th Fleet in the Mediterranean, for which she sailed on 15 January 1957.

On this, as on her succeeding tours of duty in the Mediterranean, Forrestal visited many ports to "show the flag" and take on board dignitaries and the general public. For military observers, she staged underway demonstrations to illustrate her capacity to bring air power to and from the sea in military operations on any scale. She returned to Norfolk on 22 July 1957 for exercises off the North Carolina coast in preparation for her first NATO operation, Operation Strikeback in the North Sea. This deployment, between 3 September and 22 October, found her visiting Southampton, UK, as well as drilling in the highly important task of coordinating United States naval power with that of other NATO nations.

The next year found Forrestal participating in a series of major fleet exercises as well as taking part in experimental flight operations. During the Lebanon crisis of 1958, the carrier was again called upon to operate in the eastern Atlantic to back up naval operations in the Mediterranean. She sailed from Norfolk on 11 July to embark an air group at Mayport two days later, then patrolled the Atlantic until returning to Norfolk on 17 July.

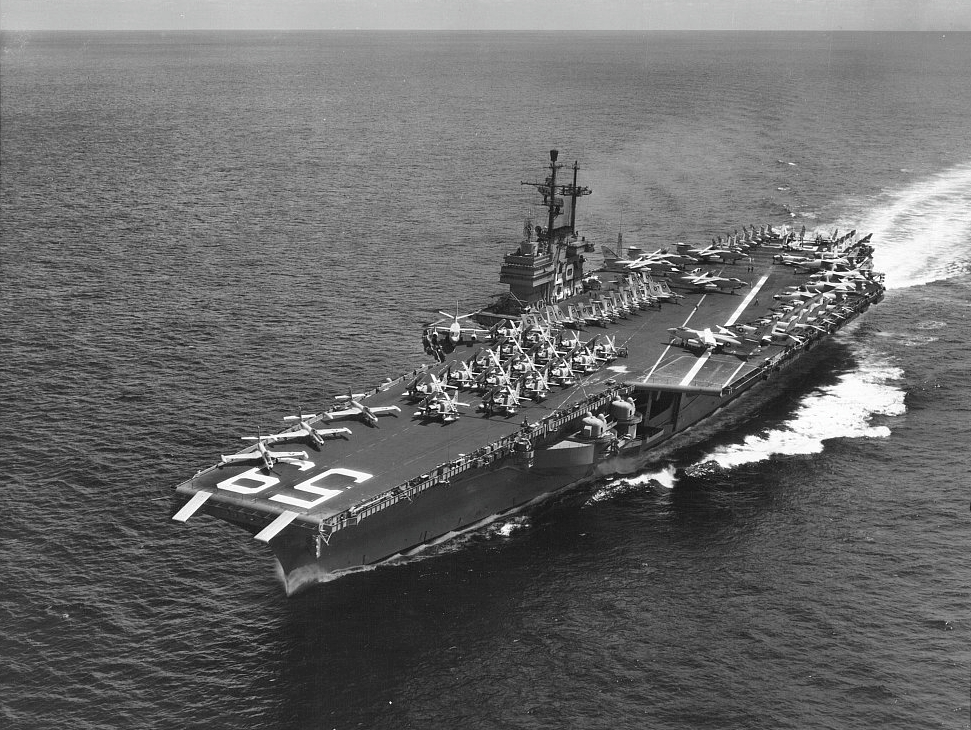
Forrestal in the Mediterranean, 1957 during her first deployment to the Sixth Fleet.

On her second tour of duty in the Mediterranean, from 2 September 1958 to 12 March 1959, Forrestal again combined a program of training, patrol, and participation in major exercises with ceremonial, hospitality and public visiting. Her guest list during this cruise was headed by United States Secretary of Defense N. H. McElroy. Returning to Norfolk, she continued the never-ending task of training new aviators, constantly maintaining her readiness for instant reaction to any demand for her services brought on by international events. Visitors during the year included King Hussein of Jordan.

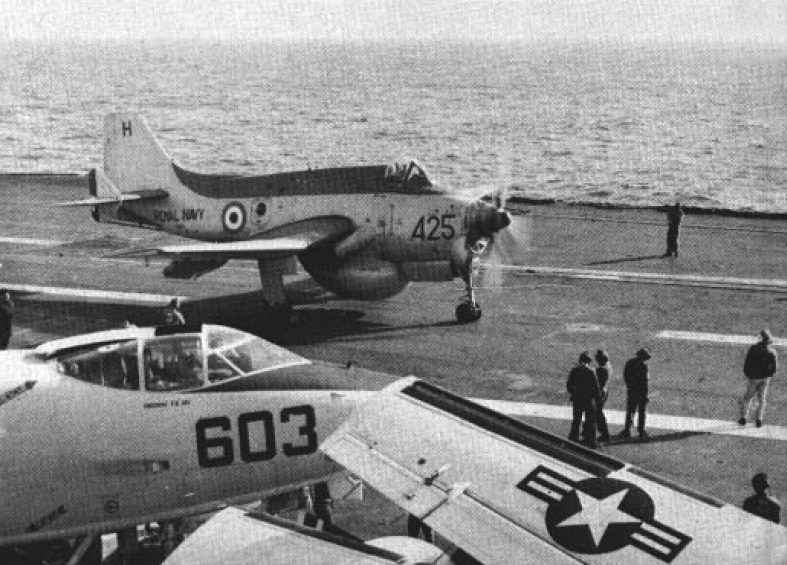
Fairey Gannet of 849 Naval Air Squadron aboard Forrestal in 1962

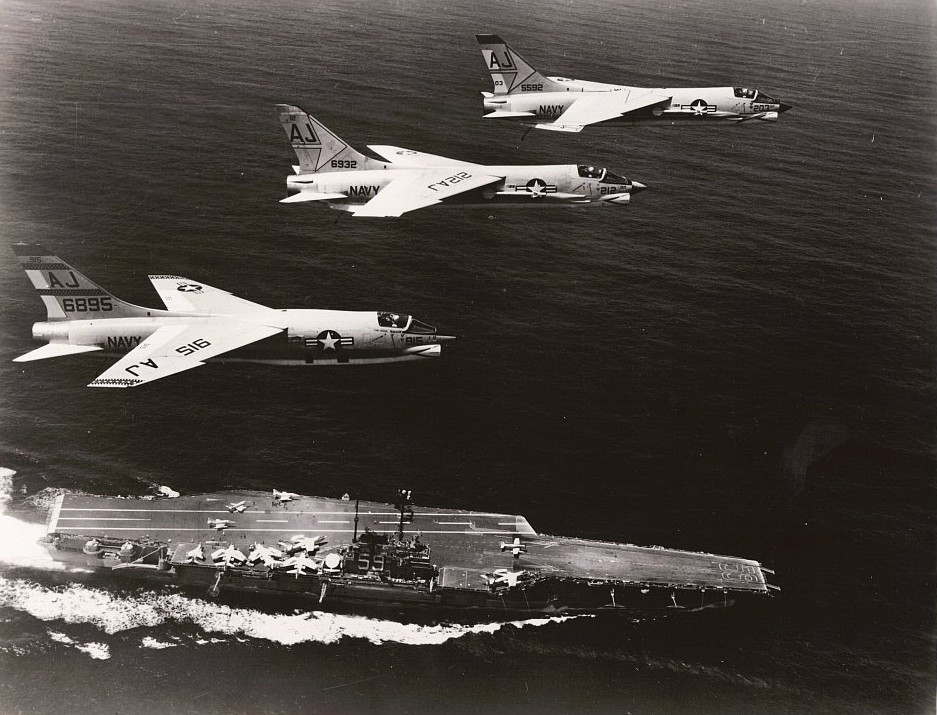
An RF-8A and a pair of F-8C Crusaders overfly Forrestal during her 1962–63 Mediterranean cruise

Forrestal again went to the 6th Fleet between 28 January 1960 and 31 August, visiting the ports typical of a Mediterranean deployment as well as Split, Croatia (then part of Yugoslavia). Again she was open for visitors at many ports, as well as taking part in the patrol and training schedule of the 6th Fleet. She completed another deployment to 6th Fleet January 1961 to August 1961, after which she entered a yard period at Norfolk Naval Shipyard where the six arresting wires were replaced with four, freed 03 level spaces were converted to berthing areas, and the right side flight deck mirror landing system was replaced with a permanent Fresnel lens in the port catwalk, among other updates. She conducted a shakedown cruise to Guantanamo Bay in January 1962 with port calls in Port-au-Prince, Haiti, and Port of Spain, Trinidad. She then acted as the defending carrier in an amphibious force landing exercise on Vieques Island; it was the largest assembled naval force since the Korean War. Forrestal with Vice-President Lyndon B. Johnson aboard, and Enterprise with President John F. Kennedy aboard hosted many foreign ambassadors, military attaches, and other diplomats for a Naval Air Power demonstration off the Virginia Capes in June 1962, with Captain Donald M. White then in command.

Forrestal deployed to the Mediterranean again on 3 August 1962 to 2 March 1963 as flagship for Commander Carrier Division Four (ComCarDiv 4) participating in NATO exercises in the Atlantic and western Mediterranean with Enterprise, British and French carriers. Cross deck operations were conducted with HMS Ark Royal. Whilst a USMC Phantom was aboard Ark Royal, it developed problems and couldn't take off to return to the Forrestal before docking in Malta. US personnel were not allowed on Malta at the time so the Phantom was painted with Royal Navy tail markings to make the jet blend in with Royal Navy Phantoms.

== 1963–1967 ==
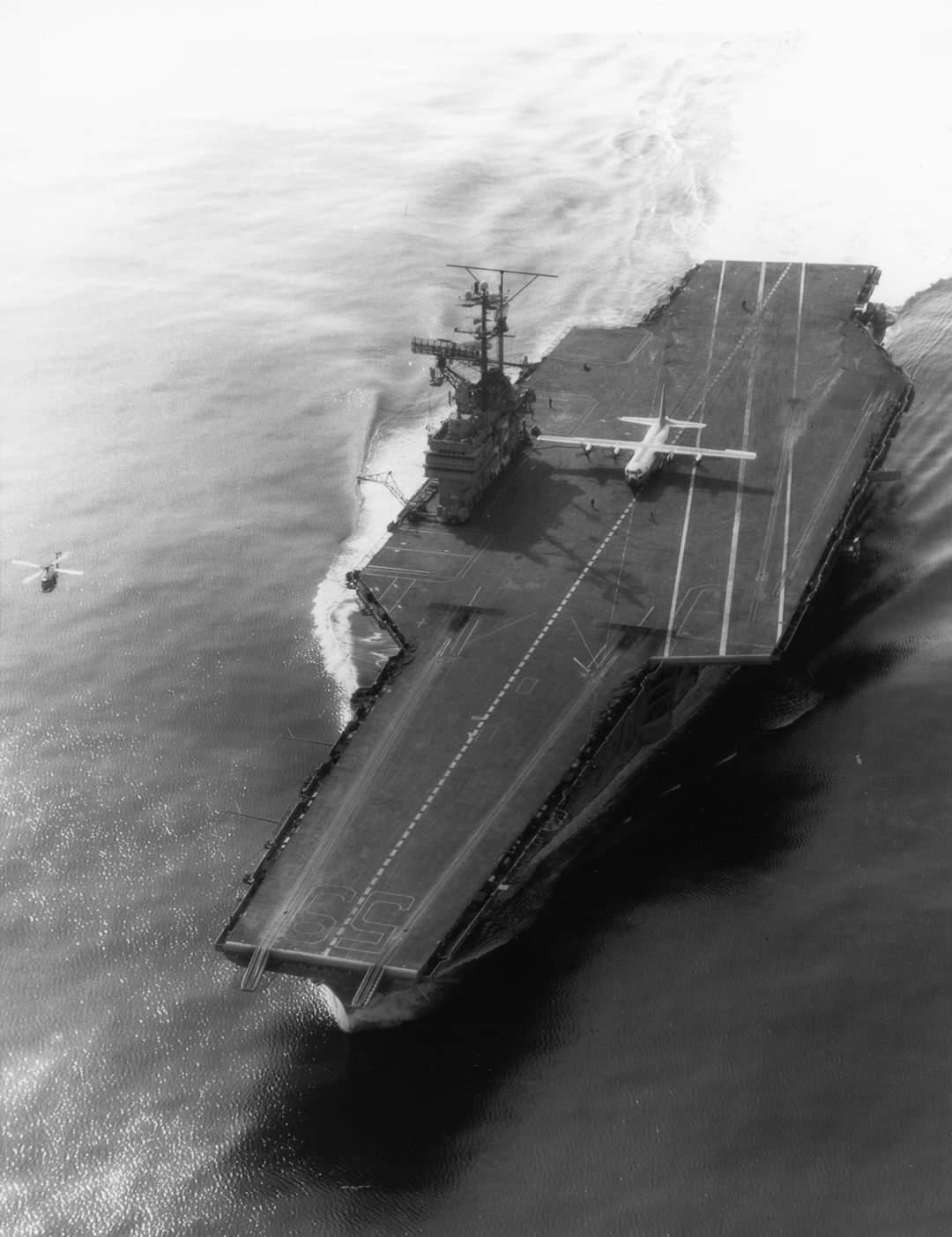
A C-130 Hercules on the deck of Forrestal, 1963.

Forrestal, under the command of Captain Dick H. Guinn, made history in November 1963, on the 8th, 21st and 22nd, when LT James H. Flatley III and his crew made 21 full-stop landings and takeoffs in a C-130 Hercules aboard the ship. The tests were conducted 500 nautical miles (930 km) out in the North Atlantic off the coast of Massachusetts. In so doing, Forrestal and the C-130 set a record for the largest and heaviest airplane landing on a Navy aircraft carrier. The Navy was trying to determine whether the big Hercules could serve as a "Super-COD", or "Carrier Onboard Delivery" aircraft. The problem was there was no aircraft which could replenish a carrier in mid-ocean. The Hercules was stable and reliable, and had a long cruising range and high payload.

The tests were more than successful. At 85,000 pounds (39,000 kg), the KC-130F came to a complete stop within 267 feet (81 m), and at the maximum load, the plane used only 745 feet (227 m) for take-off. The Navy concluded that, with the C-130 Hercules, it would be possible to lift 25,000 pounds (11,000 kg) of cargo 2,500 miles (4,000 km) and land it on a carrier. However, the idea was considered too risky for routine COD operations. The aircraft was also too large to fit on the carrier's elevators or in her hangars, severely hampering operations. The C-2 Greyhound program was developed and the first of these planes became operational in 1965. For his effort, the Navy awarded LT Flatley the Distinguished Flying Cross. The Hercules used, BuNo 149798, was retired to the National Naval Aviation Museum at Naval Air Station Pensacola, Florida, in May 2003.

"The F-4 Phantom Joins the Fleet" (1962) aboard the USS Forrestal.

In 1964, in what was known as Operation Brother Sam, U.S. president Lyndon B. Johnson sent Forrestal to support the military coup d'état against Brazilian president João Goulart. The coup was successful and led to a 20-year-long military dictatorship in Brazil. (Note: "Brazil: The Military Republic, 1964–85, Library of Congress Country Studies" [...] "The role of the United States in these events was complex and at times contradictory. An anti-Goulart press campaign was conducted throughout 1963, and in 1964 the Johnson administration gave moral support to the campaign. Ambassador Lincoln Gordon later admitted that the embassy had given money to anti-Goulart candidates in the 1962 municipal elections and had encouraged the plotters; that many extra United States military and intelligence personnel were operating in Brazil; and that four United States Navy oil tankers and the carrier Forrestal, in an operation code-named Brother Sam, had stood off the coast in case of need during the 1964 coup. Washington immediately recognized the new government in 1964 and joined the chorus chanting that the coup d'état of the "democratic forces" had staved off the hand of international communism. In retrospect, it appears that the only foreign hand involved was Washington's, although the United States was not the principal actor in these events. Indeed, the hard-liners in the Brazilian military pressured Costa e Silva into promulgating the Fifth Institutional Act on 13 December 1968. This act gave the president dictatorial powers, dissolved Congress and state legislatures, suspended the constitution, and imposed censorship.")

On 15 March 1966, Forrestal again was a witness to history when she and various other units of the Sixth Fleet made a brief stopover at Palomares, Spain, (site of an underway nuclear disaster cleanup and H-bomb recovery effort) ostensibly to deliver personnel, material support, or both. The carrier dropped anchor at 0903, departed at 1219, and resumed flight operations.

== 1967 fire ==
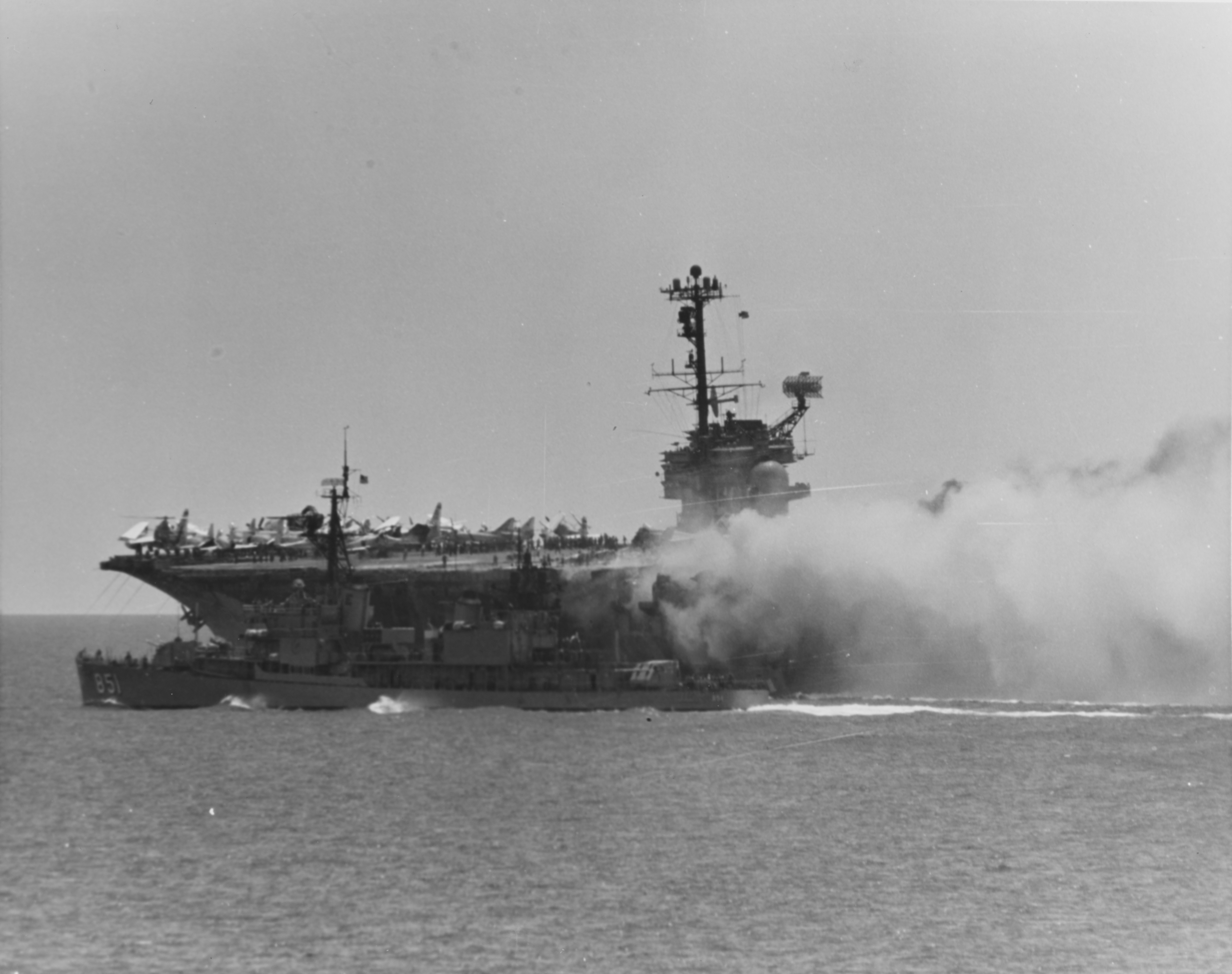
USS Rupertus aiding firefighting efforts on Forrestal during the 1967 fire.

In June 1967, Forrestal, under the command of Captain John Kingsman Beling, departed Norfolk for duty in waters off Vietnam. Once in the Gulf of Tonkin, Forrestal began four days of sorties. The planes of Attack Carrier Air Wing 17 flew about 150 missions against targets in North Vietnam from the ship. On 29 July 1967, during preparation for another strike, a Zuni rocket installed on an F-4 Phantom (#110), misfired, impacting an armed A-4 Skyhawk (#405)'s side, parked on the port side. The rocket's impact dislodged and ruptured the Skyhawk's 400-US-gallon (1,500 L) external fuel tank. Fuel from the leaking tank caught fire, creating a serious conflagration that burned for hours, killing 134, injuring 161, destroying 21 aircraft and costing the Navy US$72 million. On the flight deck that day was Lieutenant Commander (later Senator) John McCain, who was wounded by an exploding bomb. In September 1967, Captain Beling was relieved by Captain Robert B. Baldwin, who in turn was relieved in December 1968 by Captain James W. Nance.

== 1968–1975 ==
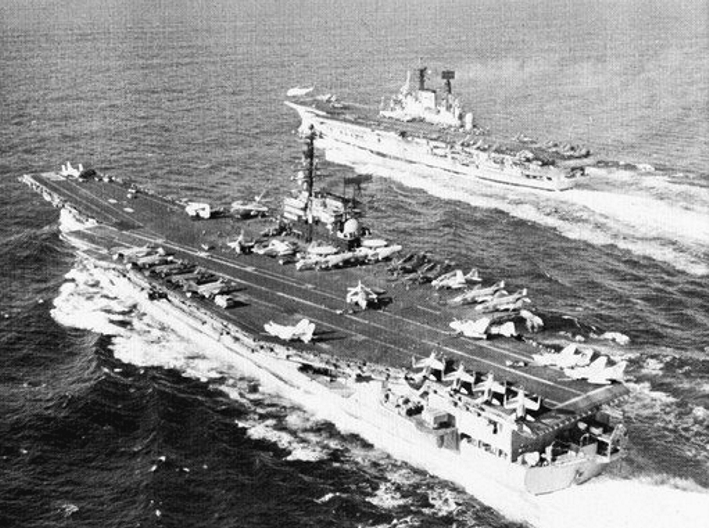
Forrestal (foreground) cruising in the Mediterranean with HMS Ark Royal in 1973

Forrestal was deployed to Mediterranean waters four times between 1968 and 1973. She also sped to Tunisia for rescue operations in the flooded Medjerda River Valley near Tunis. The ship logged three more Mediterranean deployments between 1973 and 1975. On 22 July 1974, as a result of the Turkish invasion of Cyprus, the U.S. Ambassador to Cyprus Roger Davies requested the evacuation of U.S. citizens from that island nation. In a joint Navy-Marine Corps effort, HMM-162 from the 6th Fleet amphibious assault ship USS Inchon evacuated 466 people, 384 of them U.S. citizens, in only five hours. Forrestal provided air cover for that operation.

In October 1968, during the night recovery of a VAW-123 E-2A, the aircraft boltered and went off the angled deck and into the water, nose first. When it hit the water, the aircraft flipped over onto its back, breaking its radar dome off and sank within minutes. The dome floated and was recovered. Immediately, helicopters moved into the area for search and rescue operations, three crewmen were recovered, while three were lost at sea.

On 10 July 1972, while moored at Pier 12, Norfolk, Forrestal was once again the scene of a catastrophic fire. This fire, which was set by a crewmember, was in an O-3 level computer room (just under the flight deck). A hole was cut in the flight deck to reach the fire from above and hundreds of gallons of water were pumped into the space. This ruined all of the computer equipment and the ship took on an exaggerated list, prompting concern that she might capsize. The ship returned to the yards at Portsmouth and three months later was at last able to relieve USS John F. Kennedy, which had to serve an extended Mediterranean deployment while the Forrestal was being repaired. Electrician's Mate Robert Horan, who was aboard at the time, recalls in a memoir "[The fire did] over seven million dollars in damage. The news videos...show[ed] the flight deck glowing red. We went back to Portsmouth for repairs and I believe we got most of the CIC and electronics equipment that was supposed to go on board the USS Nimitz, then under construction."

In June 1974, Forrestal sent a contingent of 34 sailors and two officers to represent the U.S. Navy at the 30th anniversary of D-Day at Normandy, France. The group marched in various parades at the Normandy Beaches on 6 June 1974 as well as Cherbourg, France and was well received by the locals. The group was passed in review by retired General of the Army Omar Bradley. This contingent of sailors were flown off of Forrestal by SH-3 Sea Kings of HELANTISUBRON 3 (HS-3) onto the deck of USS Milwaukee (AOR-2), then taken to Naval Station Rota, Spain. After a few days of refresher "marching", they were flown to Cherbourg, France in a C-130. Following the celebrations, the group reunited with Forrestal at the island of Crete in mid June.

== 1975–1980 ==
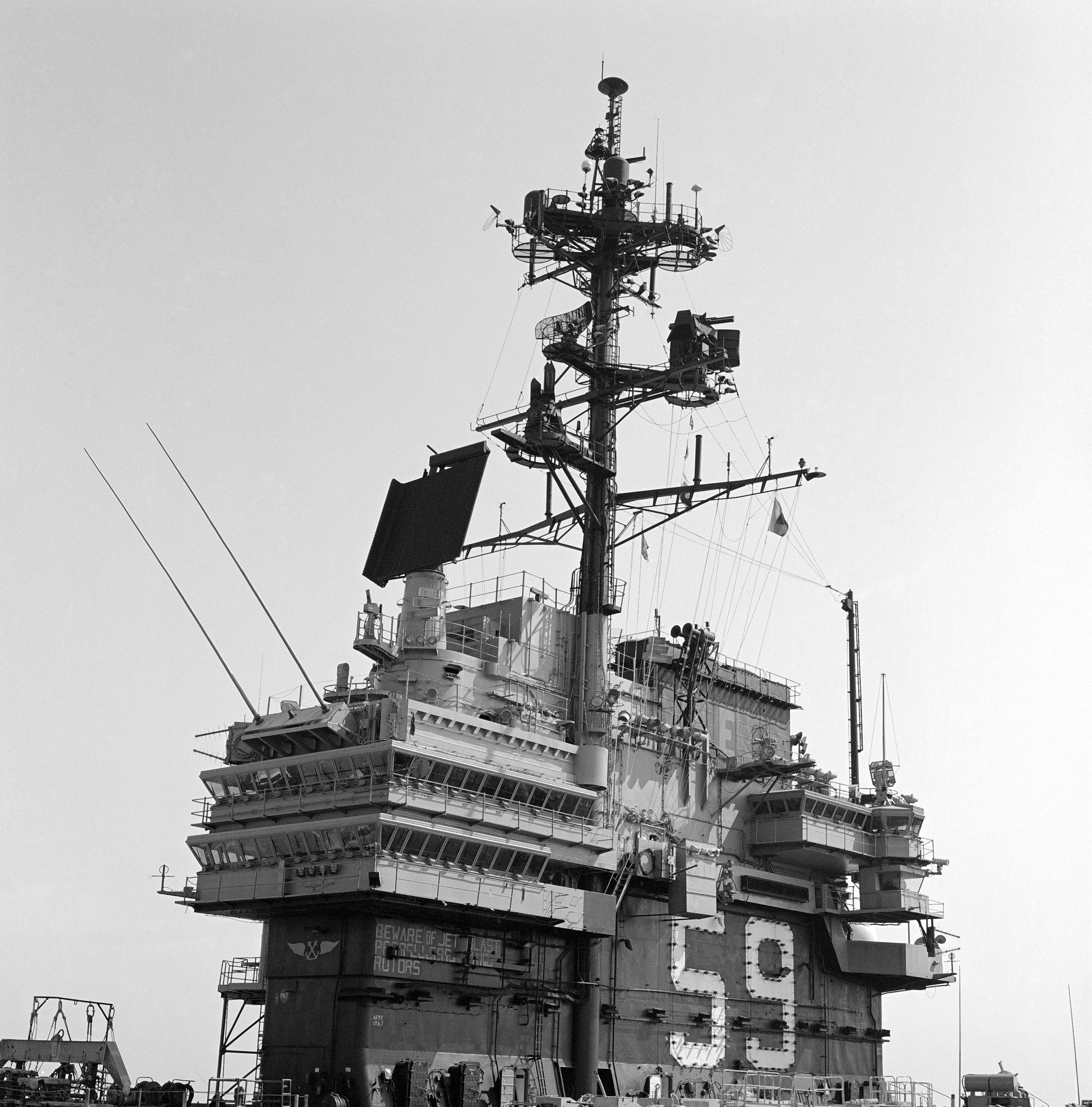
Forrestal's island, c. 1989

On 30 June 1975, Forrestal was reclassified a "Multi-purpose Aircraft Carrier", CV-59. Also in 1975 Forrestal was selected to be host ship for the International Naval Review in New York City on the nation's Bicentennial. On 4 July 1976, on Forrestal's flight deck, President Gerald Ford rang in the Bicentennial and reviewed over 40 tall ships from countries around the world.

Shortly after the review, Forrestal participated in a special shock test. It involved the detonation of high explosives near the hull to determine if a capital ship could withstand the strain of close quarter combat and still remain operational.

In September 1977, following a nine-month overhaul, Forrestal departed Norfolk and shifted her homeport to Mayport. The carrier left Mayport on Friday, 13 January 1978 for a three-week at-sea period in the Atlantic Fleet Weapons Training Facility (AFWTF) of the Roosevelt Roads Operating Area to complete the third phase of Type Commander's Training (TYT-3), and to undergo the Operational Readiness Evaluation (ORE). On the evening of 15 January 1978 as an A-7 Corsair II from VA-81 crashed on the flight deck, killing two deck crewmen and injuring 10 others. The pilot was operating without communication gear due to an onboard malfunction, and as he was making his approach, he saw that the "ball" was lit (signalling that it was permissible to land). The pilot ejected safely after seeing that the deck was covered with parked and moving aircraft, by which time it was impossible to pull up. He was recovered, suffering only minor injuries, but his Corsair struck another A-7 and an EA-6B before careening across the deck in a ball of flames. A small fire on the aft portion of the deck, caused by fuel spilled during the crash, was extinguished within seconds. At the time of the accident, Forrestal was operating about 49 miles (79 km) off St. Augustine, Florida. A memorial service for the dead was held on board on 19 January. The ship returned to Mayport on 3 February.

Forrestal left Mayport for the Mediterranean on 4 April 1978. At 22:00 on 8 April, just minutes after the ship had finished a general quarters drill, the crew was called to G.Q. again, but this time it was not a drill; a fire had broken out in the Number Three Main Machinery Room. Freshly painted thermal insulation in Three Main engine room had been set smoldering by hot steam lines. Watch-standers within the space activated an extinguishing system and had the fire out within seconds.

Three days later, the crew again was called to respond to another emergency G.Q. At midnight on 11 April, a fire was discovered in a catapult steam trunk in the forward part of the ship at about the 01 level, and another fire was found in an adjoining storeroom minutes later. The at-sea fire brigade, working with area repair lockers, had the fires out within the hour.

On 10 May 1978 while in Guantanamo Bay, Cuba, flooding, which began in a pump room in the aft portion of the ship, rose to a height of 20 feet (6.1 m) before it was controlled. The flood spread into food storage rooms, destroying most of the ship's stocks of fresh milk and produce. Divers from the ship's Explosive Ordnance Disposal (EOD) team dropped into the pump room to plug the leak. Total damage from the flooding was estimated at $30,000.

From 19 to 29 May 1978, Forrestal participated in Operation Dawn Patrol, the first of three NATO exercises the ship would be involved in during the deployment. Dawn Patrol involved air and ground forces and over 80 ships from six NATO countries. Forrestal's role during the exercise included protecting a Turkish amphibious task group and working with USS Nimitz and the French aircraft carrier Foch to defend against simulated "enemy" ships and aircraft.

During this sea period, two separate air crashes on successive days left one pilot dead and another injured. On 24 June 1978, LCDR T. P. Anderson, Operations Officer for Carrier Air Wing Seventeen, was killed when his A-7E Corsair II crashed into the sea during a practice bombing mission. Before the crash, the pilot ejected while the plane was inverted in less than ideal weather conditions. On 25 June, a pilot from VA-83, also flying an A-7E, ejected shortly after takeoff due to a catapult malfunction, suffering minor injuries. He could be seen swimming away from the side of the ship as it passed near him. A rescue crew aboard an SH-3D Sea King helicopter from HS-3 recovered the pilot and returned to the ship within eight minutes after the crash. Both accidents occurred as the ship was operating in the Ionian Sea, east of Sicily.

From 4 to 19 September 1978, Forrestal participated in the massive NATO exercise Northern Wedding, which included over 40,000 men, 22 submarines, and 800 rotary and fixed-wing aircraft from nine NATO countries. Northern Wedding, which took place every four years, practiced NATO's ability to reinforce and resupply Europe in times of tension or war. During the exercise Forrestal and the British aircraft carrier HMS Ark Royal headed separate task groups, steaming in a two-carrier formation to gain sea control and deploying their aircraft in support of mock amphibious landings in the Shetland Islands and Jutland, Denmark.

From 28 September to 10 October, Forrestal participated in Display Determination, the third and final NATO exercise of the deployment. The operation, involving ships, aircraft, and personnel from eight NATO countries, was designed to practice rapid reinforcement and resupply of the southern European region in times of tension or war. Forrestal arrived in Rota, Spain, on 11 October for the last overseas port stop of the deployment.

On 13 October 1978, the ship put to sea to conduct a one-day exercise with a task group of deploying U.S. ships headed by the aircraft carrier USS Saratoga. Air Wing Seventeen's planes conducted mock attacks on the task group to allow the ships to practice anti-air warfare. Forrestal returned to Rota late in the evening on the 13th.

Before dawn on 15 October, Forrestal departed Rota and outchopped from the Sixth Fleet, having been relieved by Saratoga. On the homeward transit, Forrestal took an extreme northerly course as part of a special operation code-named Windbreak. Commander Second Fleet, Vice Adm. Wesley L. McDonald, embarked in Forrestal for the exercise. Windbreak was designed to introduce U.S. sailors and equipment to relatively unfamiliar waters and conditions, and to gauge Soviet interest in U.S. ships in transit to and from the Mediterranean. During the exercise, Forrestal traveled as far north as 62 degrees latitude, 150 miles (240 km) south of Iceland, encountering seas to 34 feet (10 m), winds in excess of 70 knots (130 km/h), and a wind chill factor that drove the temperature as far down as 0 °F (−18 °C). The waves were high enough to crash over the flight deck as the ship drove west. Also participating in Windbreak were the guided missile cruiser USS Harry E. Yarnell and the destroyer USS Arthur W. Radford.

Forrestal returned to Mayport on 26 October 1978. On 13 November, Forrestal commenced a four-month period of upkeep and repair known as an Extended Selected Restricted Availability (ESRA), to be conducted as the ship was moored alongside the carrier pier in Mayport. Forrestal ended 1978 as she had started it, moored to the carrier pier in Mayport.

On 27 August 1979 Forrestal had to make an emergency deployment due to Hurricane David. It was feared the ship could be damaged and in turn damage the carrier pier as the storm surge from the hurricane thrust inland. Forrestal traveled through the main part of the storm and emerged in the eye briefly before coming out of the opposite side as the storm moved northwest along the east coast. The ship carried a skeleton crew and no aircraft.

After completing her 15th Mediterranean cruise from November 1979 to May 1980 she celebrated her silver anniversary in October 1980. Forrestal got underway on her 16th Mediterranean deployment in March 1981 and returned to the carrier pier in Mayport on 15 September 1981 .

== 1981–1987 ==
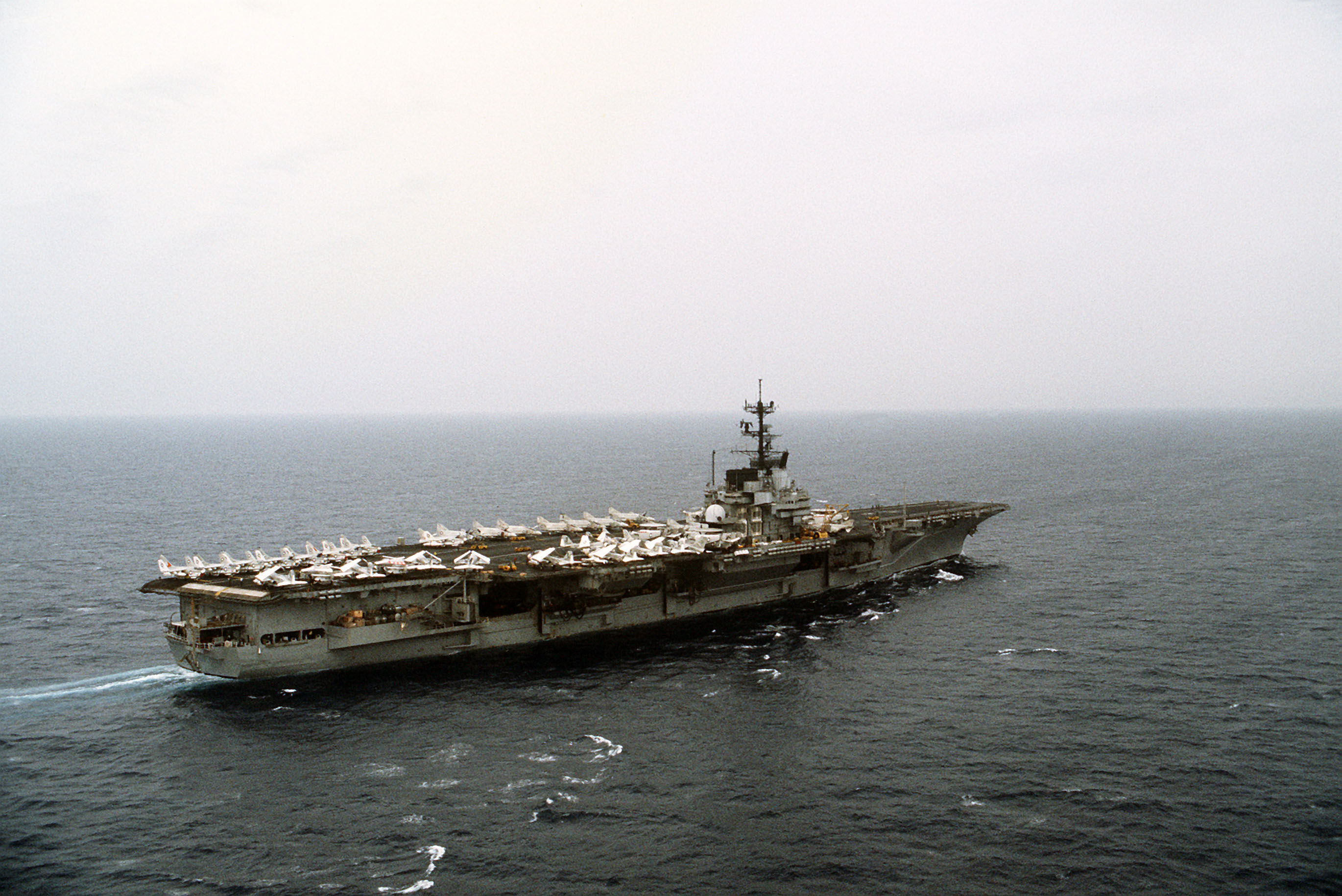
Forrestal c. 1982

On 2 March 1981, Forrestal began her 16th Mediterranean deployment and second quarter century of naval service. During the Syria/Israel missile crisis, Forrestal maintained a high state of readiness for 53 consecutive days at sea. In a Gulf of Sidra exercise, two Libyan aircraft were shot down after firing on F-14s from Nimitz over international waters. Forrestal aircraft made more than 60% of all the intercepts of Libyan planes. After departing the Mediterranean she operated above the Arctic Circle as part of NATO Ocean Venture '81.

After a repair period, Forrestal deployed for her 18th Mediterranean cruise on 8 June 1982, and operated in the eastern Mediterranean in support of the Lebanon Contingency Force of 800 U.S. Marines in Beirut. On 12 September 1982, after transiting the Suez Canal for the first time in her 28-year history, she entered the Indian Ocean. This marked the first time that Forrestal had operated with 7th Fleet since the 1967 Vietnam cruise.

Forrestal completed the five and one-half-month deployment with a nighttime arrival at Mayport on 16 November 1982 and immediately began preparing for the Service Life Extension Program (SLEP). The ship shifted homeport to Philadelphia Naval Shipyard, Philadelphia on 18 January 1983, and embarked on the 28-month, $550 million SLEP, designed to extend the life of U.S. aircraft carriers another 15 to 20 years.

During Forrestal's SLEP, the ship was completely emptied and most major equipment was removed for rework or replacement. Forrestal's successful SLEP period was completed on time when the ship left Philadelphia on 20 May 1985. After completing a four-day transit to her homeport of Mayport, Forrestal immediately began a workup cycle in preparation for her first deployment in over four years.

Forrestal departed Mayport on 2 June 1986, on her 19th deployment. During this cruise, Forrestal aircraft frequently operated in the international airspace of the Tripoli Flight region, the international air traffic control sector of Libya. Forrestal also participated in Operation Sea Wind a joint U.S.-Egyptian training exercise and Display Determination, which featured low-level coordinated strikes and air combat maneuvering training over Turkey.

In 1987, Forrestal went through yet another period of pre-deployment workups. This included refresher training, carrier qualifications, and a six-week deployment to the North Atlantic to participate in Ocean Safari '87. In this exercise, Forrestal operated with NATO forces in the fjords of Norway.

The ship and crew performed so well in Ocean Safari '87 that Forrestal's commanding officer, Captain John A. Pieno Jr., recommended that the ship be granted a special liberty call in the United States as a reward. Special liberty calls serve to reward Navy personnel with a trip to other parts of the U.S. and provides Americans who would normally never see warships and planes an up close look at life in the United States Navy. CAPT Pieno being a native of New Orleans, Louisiana, decided that New Orleans, during her Mardi Gras celebration, would be the perfect location to show off his pride and joy. During her trip to New Orleans Forrestal broke another record by becoming the largest naval warship ever to come up the Mississippi River. Also during her four days in New Orleans she accommodated tours for over 40,000 visitors. The tour included viewings and descriptions of all her aircraft, damage control demonstrations, and the crowd's favorite, a ride on one of her four aircraft elevators.

== 1988–1993 ==
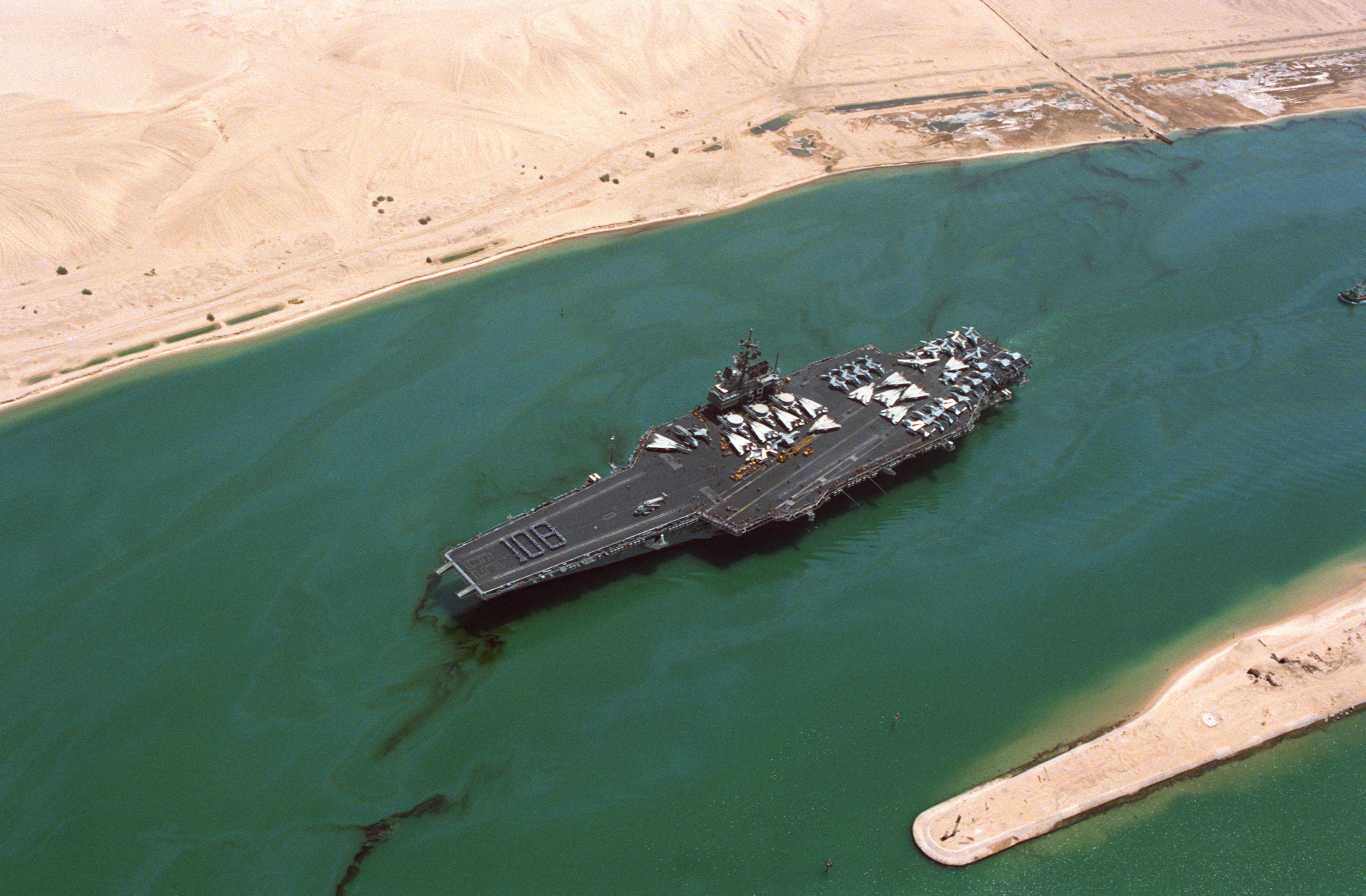
Forrestal transiting the Suez Canal, August 1988. The crew forms 108 to represent the 108 consecutive days at sea.

Forrestal departed on her 20th major deployment on 25 April 1988. She steamed directly to the North Arabian Sea via the Suez Canal in support of America's Earnest Will operations in the region. She spent 108 consecutive days at sea before her first liberty port. During the five and one-half month deployment, Forrestal operated in three ocean areas and spent only 15 days in port. She returned on 7 October 1988, and received the Meritorious Unit Commendation for her superior operational performance during the deployment.

After a brief stand down period followed by local operations, Forrestal participated in New York City's Fleet Week in May 1989, and then commenced preparations for her next deployment. Also in 1989, she won the Marjorie Sterrett Battleship Fund Award for the Atlantic Fleet.

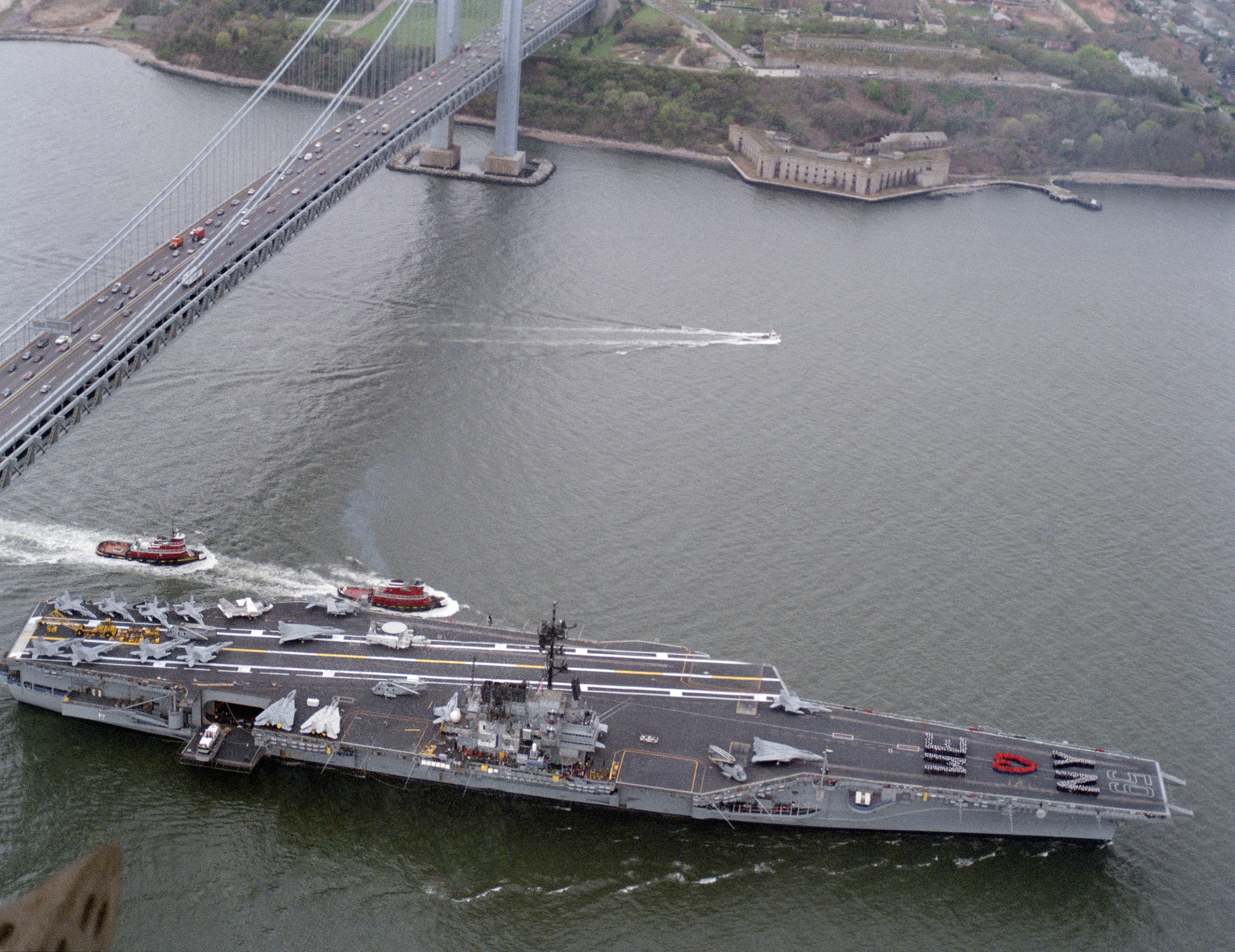
Forrestal passes under the Verrazzano–Narrows Bridge for Fleet Week 1989.

Forrestal's departure for her 21st major deployment was delayed when a fire caused major damage to a primary command and control trunk space. Through the efforts of the ship's crew and civilian contractors, Forrestal was able to depart for her deployment on 6 November 1989, completing the necessary repairs well ahead of projections. The 9 October 1989 fire caused around $2.5 million in damage and injured 11 sailors.

The final two months of 1989 proved exciting. Beyond the "routine" exercises and training initiatives, Forrestal's crew became part of history, as they provided support to President George H. W. Bush during his Malta Summit. The support included a three-hour Presidential visit to the ship. Forrestal participated in numerous exercises during this deployment including Harmonie Sud, Tunisian Amphibious and National Week. She returned to Mayport on 12 April 1990, ending a deployment which had included nine port visits in seven different countries. After a post deployment stand down, Forrestal completed a drydocking selected restricted availability at Mayport from 14 May 1990 – 27 August 1990.

From September to November 1990, Forrestal underwent repairs at Norfolk Naval Shipyard. Repairs included work on the catapult system, hull and other changes to accommodate the F/A-18 Hornet. Forrestal returned to Mayport 21 November 1990.

In 1989, during work up cruises to prepare for the upcoming deployment, Forrestal was diverted from an 11-day carrier task force training exercise in the Atlantic. The order came in just after midnight and the Forrestal was directed to leave the task force, and proceed West at flank speed. After 20 hours, she slowed to 2 knots and took up station keeping off the North West coast of Puerto Rico. At around 12:30 the second evening, 2 helicopters arrived, delivering SEAL Team Six to the Forrestal's deck. The crew and its "visitors" cruised for 3 days to the South West Caribbean sea off the Panama and Colombian coasts, where Seal Team Six departed. It is unclear if the operation was an attempt to capture Manuel Noriega, or if it was in support of Operation Pokeweed to apprehend Colombian drug lord Pablo Escobar.

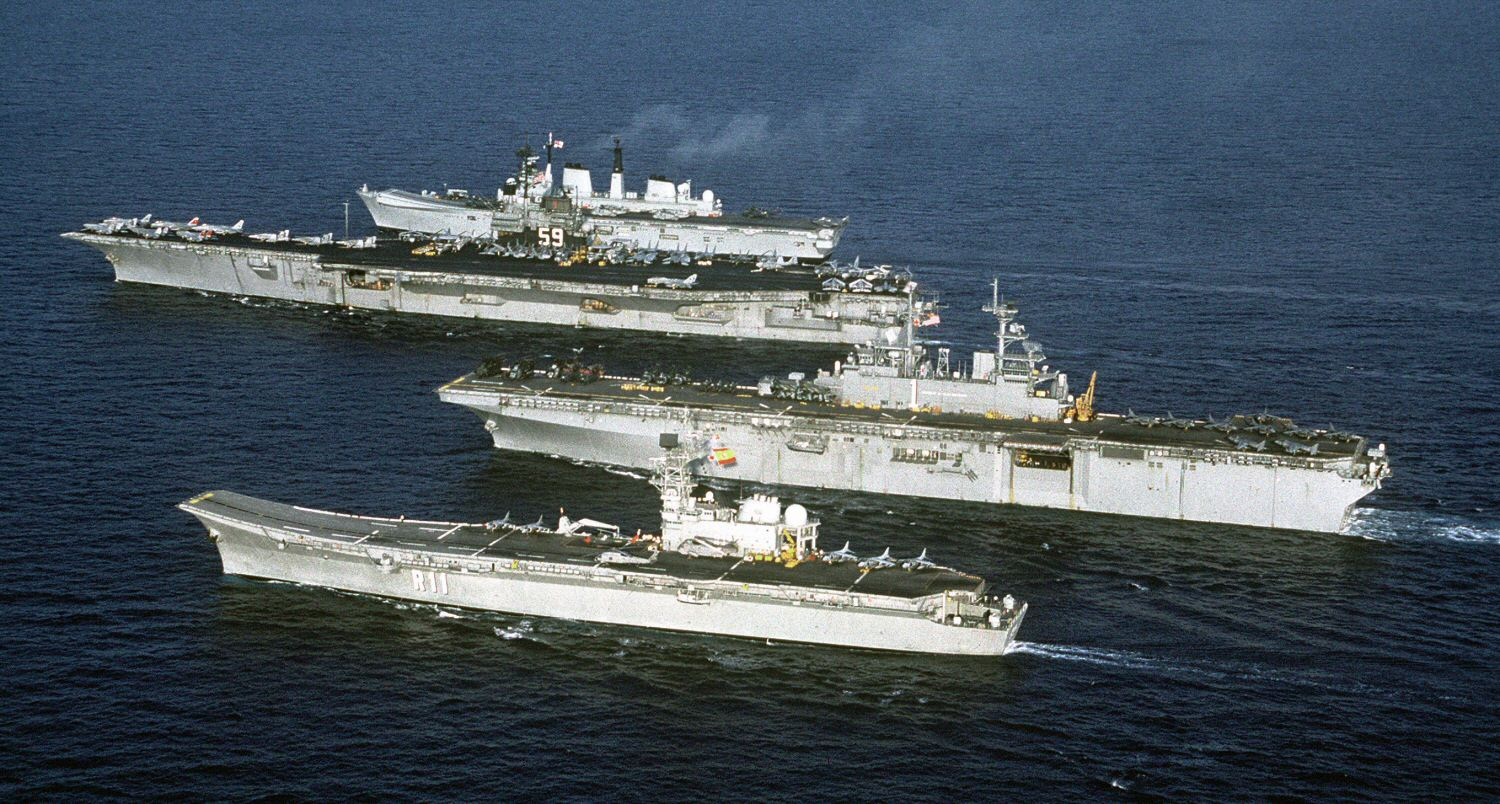
Forrestal in 1991 during Exercise Display Determination; the ships are (bottom to top) Príncipe de Asturias, Wasp, Forrestal and Invincible

The year of 1991 was one of anticipation and change for Forrestal and her crew, as she spent the first five months maintaining combat readiness as the east coast ready carrier. Maintaining a hectic and challenging period of at-sea operations, Forrestal's anticipated deployment in support of Operation Desert Storm was not to be, and orders to deploy were canceled twice during the conflict. The call to deploy finally came and Forrestal commenced the 22nd and final operational deployment on 30 May 1991.

No less challenging than the months of maintaining readiness for combat, Forrestal's deployment was repeatedly referred to as "transitional." During the ensuing six months, Forrestal was called upon to provide air power presence and airborne intelligence support for Operation Provide Comfort, and to initiate, test and evaluate a wide range of innovative Sixth Fleet battle group tactics and new carrier roles.

The year ended with Forrestal making advanced preparations for a change of homeport to Naval Air Station Pensacola, Florida, and the transition into a new role as the Navy's training carrier, replacing USS Lexington. Forrestal was redesignated AVT-59 and arrived in Pensacola on 4 February. The ship and crew returned to New Orleans for a visit in May, 1992. Forrestal arrived in Philadelphia on 14 September 1992 to begin a 14-month, $157 million complex overhaul prior to assuming duties as a training carrier. In early 1993, however, the Navy decided to decommission Forrestal and leave the Navy without a dedicated training carrier.

== Decommissioning and fate ==
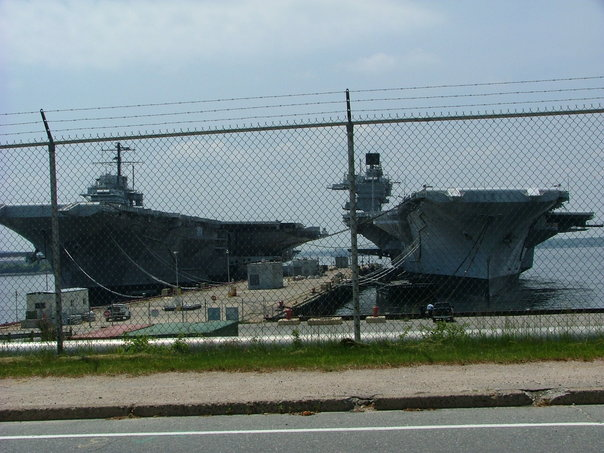
ex-Forrestal (left) and ex-Saratoga (right) at NAVSTA Newport; Pier Two Middletown, Rhode Island, awaiting their respective fates.

After more than 37 years of service, Forrestal was decommissioned on 11 September 1993 at Pier 6E in Philadelphia, and was stricken from the Naval Vessel Register the same day. After being stricken, ex-Forrestal was heavily stripped to support the rest of the carrier fleet. Two 30 ton anchors were transferred to John C. Stennis, while the ship's four nearly new bronze propellers were installed on Harry S. Truman, then under construction. On 16 June 1999, the Navy announced that the ship would be available for donation to an eligible organization for use as a museum or memorial. The USS Forrestal Museum Inc. began a campaign to obtain the ship from the Navy via donation, for use as a museum, to be located in Baltimore, but this plan was not successful. No other viable applications were received and the vessel was removed from donation hold in December 2003 and redesignated for disposal. According to the NVR, efforts were made to determine her viability to be "donated for use as fishing reef." In 2007, the ship was environmentally prepared for sinking as an artificial reef as was USS Oriskany. Due to elements of the Forrestal design having led directly to current aircraft carrier design, it was intended that the ship be donated to a state and sunk to become a deep water reef, for fishery propagation and not be accessible to divers. That plan never materialized.

On 15 June 2010, ex-Forrestal departed Naval Station Newport in Newport, Rhode Island, where she had been stored since 1998, under tow for the inactive ship storage facility in Philadelphia and tied up at Pier 4, next to ex-USS John F. Kennedy (CV-67).

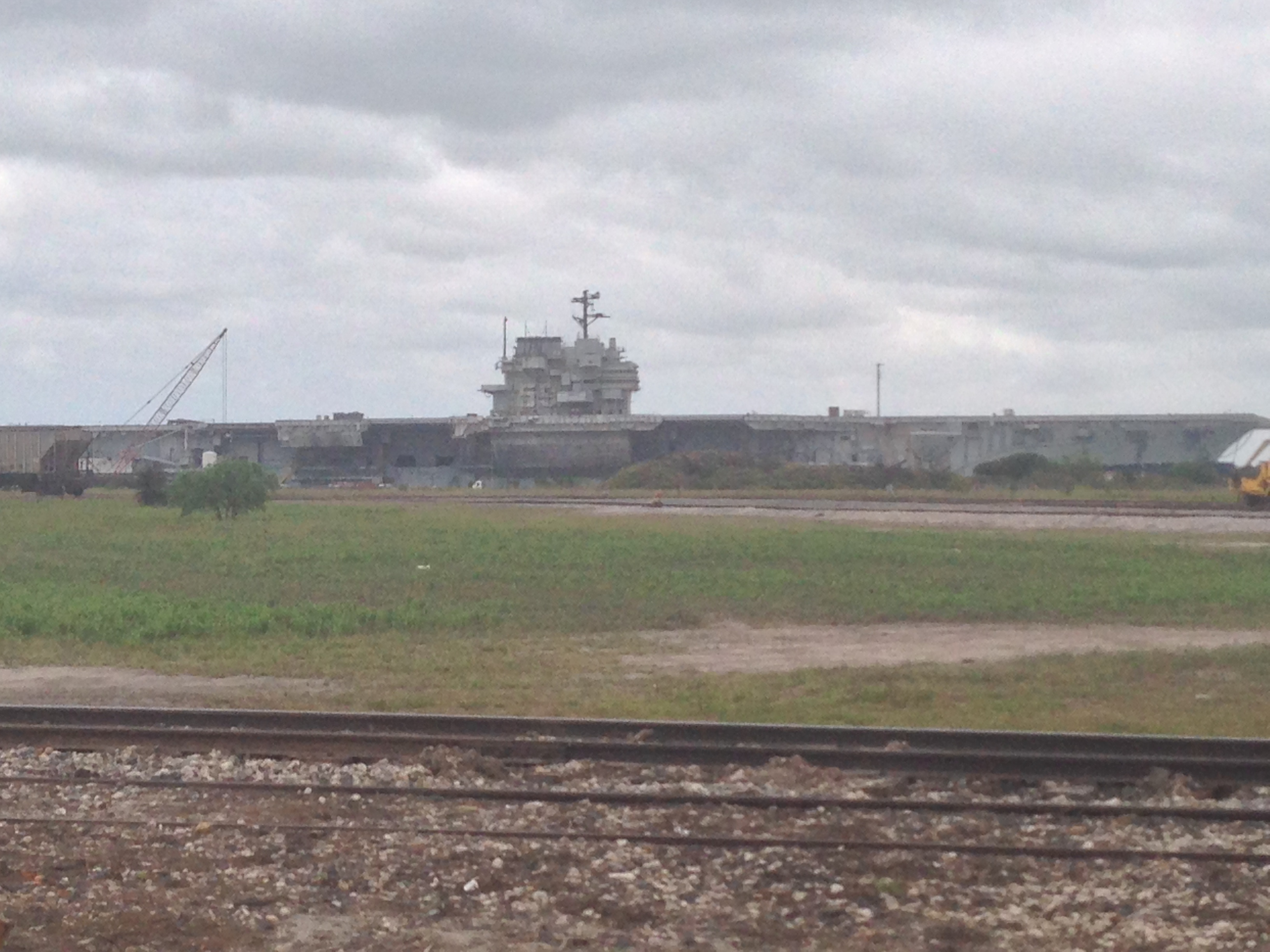
ex-Forrestal at the shipyard in Brownsville being broken up

On 26 January 2012, the Navy's Naval Sea Systems Command posted a notice of solicitation for the towing and complete dismantlement of multiple CV-59/CV-63 Class aircraft carriers in the United States, to include ex-Forrestal (CV-59), ex-USS Independence (CV-62), ex-USS Saratoga (CV-60), and ex-USS Constellation (CV-64). These solicitations were posted in May 2012 and subsequently awarded to three successful offerors, pending their receipt of the facility security clearance required as part of the contract award. After the initial award of one carrier to each successful offeror, this contract provides the Navy with the capability to scrap other decommissioned conventionally-powered aircraft carriers over a five-year period.

In October 2013, it was announced ex-Forrestal would be scrapped by All Star Metals in Brownsville, Texas, at a cost of 1 cent. She left the Philadelphia Naval Yard via a team of tugboats at 5:00AM on 4 February 2014. She arrived at All Star Metals in Brownsville on 18 February 2014 for final scrapping. According to the Naval Vessel Register, scrapping was completed 15 December 2015. Her stern plate was saved and restored and now is in the hands of the National Naval Aviation Museum in Pensacola, Florida. The ship's anchors were preserved and installed on USS John C. Stennis during refueling and complex overhaul in July 2023.

== See also ==
- List of aircraft carriers
- List of aircraft carriers of the United States Navy
