= Admiral Donnelly =

Admiral Donnelly may refer to:

- John J. Donnelly (born 1952), U.S. Navy vice admiral
- Michael P. Donnelly (admiral) (born 1967), U.S. Navy rear admiral
- Ross Donnelly (1764–1840), British Royal Navy admiral
