= MIT Seminar XXI =

MIT School for national security professionals

- Mit Seminar XXI logo

Location
- 77 Massachusetts Avenue; Cambridge, Massachusetts 02139; United States

Information
- Other names: Seminar XXI
- Type: Seminar
- Established: 1986
- Founder: Suzanne Berger, Jake W. Stewart, and Mitzi Wertheim
- Director: Kelly Greenhill
- Grades: Postgraduate
- Website: semxxi.mit.edu

MIT Seminar XXI is an educational program for national security professionals run by the Massachusetts Institute of Technology (MIT). Originally for military leaders when begun in 1986, leaders from various government, non-government, and private organizations attend the seminar. The seminar runs annually from September to April in the national capital region. MIT president Susan Hockfield called it a "legendary program".

As of 2020, 2,530 fellows had graduated from the program. Graduates have served in top positions in the U.S. Department of Defense, Department of State and other government, non-government, and private organizations. These include ambassadors, agency directors, combatant commanders, members of the Joint Chiefs of Staff, and university president. Faculty has included Condoleezza Rice, Caspar Weinberger, Kathleen Hicks, Michèle Flournoy, Bernard Lewis, Francis Fukuyama, and Peter Singer, among others. Faculty instructors come from top universities in the United States such as Harvard, Yale, MIT, Cornell, and Columbia as well as internationally while also including think tanks, non-governmental organizations, and private organizations.

== History ==
The school began in 1986 with its first seminar meeting that September 12–14. Its three founders were Suzanne Berger, Jake W. Stewart, and Mitzi Wertheim who wanted to improve on the national security community's perspective in the 1970s and 1980s. Its initial design was to "provide a unique educational perspective for senior military and civilian officials and to afford an opportunity for frank and challenging exchanges of ideas between policymakers, university scholars, and Seminar XXI Fellows".

Seminar XXI Program Directors included Suzanne Berger (1986–1993); Barry Posen, Myron Weiner, and Ken Oye (1993–1998); Ken Oye (1998–2000), and Robert Art (2000–2021). As of July 2021, Dr. Kelly Greenhill became the seminar director.

As of 2020, 2,530 fellows had graduated from the program.

== Structure and admissions ==
Seminar XXI falls under MIT's Center for International Studies. Initially for military students, fellows since the outset have come from various organizations. These include U.S. Department of Defense including the Office of the Secretary of Defense, the U.S. Joint Staff, and military services; international militaries; Department of State; Department of Homeland Security; Department of Energy; Government Accountability Office; Congressional Budget Office; various elements of the U.S. Intelligence Community; the Arms Control and Disarmament Agency; the United States Coast Guard; Federal Bureau of Investigation; National Defense University; various national laboratories; U.S. Agency for International Development; think tanks such as the Institute for Defense Analyses; the Center for Naval Analyses; the Johns Hopkins Applied Physics Laboratory; and other non-governmental organizations.

Prospective students must be nominated by a senior executive in their organization. Nominees apply to MIT's Seminar XII for consideration by the board comprising an executive committee and alumni. Selected students attend the following year's seminar. The 2022–2023 academic year cohort comprised 82 students.

== Curriculum ==
A Seminar XXI cube.

The seminar educates national security professionals across multiple government and non-governmental organizations "with significant potential to move into key decision-making roles in the next 5–10 years". As of 2023, the curriculum comprises nine sessions in the National Capital Region between September and May. The curriculum for the 2022–2023 academic year included topics such as: Religion, Identity politics, and Civil wars; Realism, Liberalism, and China; Pandemic Security and COVID-19; Cybersecurity and Biosecurity; Japan, Europe, and South Korea – US Alliance Relationships; National Economies in a Globalized World; Iran, Turkey, and Israel; and U.S. National Security Policy. Graduates receive a distinctive "Black Cube" on graduation inscribed with their academic year.

== Notable faculty ==
The seminar has featured a number of notable faculty members. These include the Honorable Condoleezza Rice, Honorable Caspar Weinberger, Honorable Kathleen Hicks, Michèle Flournoy, Bernard Lewis, Francis Fukuyama, Peter Singer, Sumit Ganguly, Samuel Huntington, James Stavridis, Sarah Chayes, John Mearsheimer, Joseph Nye, Anne-Marie Slaughter, Gerard Prunier, and James Dobbins.

Faculty as of 2023 include academics from universities such as Harvard, Yale, MIT, Cornell, Columbia, University of Pennsylvania, Princeton, Tufts, Johns Hopkins, Georgetown, University of Chicago, Notre Dame, Loughborough University of London, George Washington, Dartmouth, Texas A&M, and Syracuse University. Think tanks, non-governmental, and private organizations also have faculty representatives, such as Brookings, Center for Strategic and International Studies, American Enterprise Institute, Council on Foreign Relations, the Carnegie Endowment for International Peace, Boston Dynamics, and Over Zero.

== Notable students ==
Graduates have served in various U.S. government and non-government leadership positions including Director of the Central Intelligence Agency; Director of the National Security Agency; Deputy Secretary of Defense; Director, U.S. Agency for International Development; U.S. Ambassador to Azerbaijan; U.S. Ambassador to Burundi; U.S. Ambassador and Special Negotiator for Eurasian Conflicts; U.S. Ambassador to Zimbabwe; Chairman of the Joint Chiefs of Staff; Supreme Allied Commander Europe; Commander, U.S. Indo-Pacific Command; Commander, U.S. Strategic Command; Commander, U.S. Transportation Command; Commander, U.S. Southern Command; Commander, U.S. Cyber Command; Chief of Staff of the United States Army; Chief of Staff of the United States Air Force; Chief of Naval Operations; Commandant of the Marine Corps; Commanding General, U.S. Army Europe; Vice Commandant of the Coast Guard, President of Texas A&M University, and Sergeant at Arms of the United States House of Representatives. (Note: Admiral Stuart Munsch, Commander of U.S. Naval Forces Europe and Africa also lists Seminar XXI in his biography.)

Alumni from the U.S. government and uniformed services include the Honorable Andrew S. Natsios, Honorable Robert Work, Honorable Rudy de Leon, Ambassador Carey Cavanaugh, Ambassador Reno Harnish, Ambassador Pamela J. H. Slutz, Ambassador Harry Thomas, General Mark Milley, Admiral James Stavridis, General Philip Breedlove, General George Casey, Admiral Charles Ray, Admiral John Richardson, Admiral Robert Willard, General Jim Conway, General John M. Paxton Jr., General Mark Welch, Admiral Harry Harris, General Lee Butler, General James Cartwright, General James Conway, General Montgomery Meigs, General Norton Schwartz, Admiral Robert F. Willard, Vice Admiral Joanna Nunan, Lieutenant General Bruce Wright, Vice Admiral Sean Buck, Vice Admiral John Donnelly, Vice Admiral William Hilarides, Vice Admiral Michael Franken, Vice Admiral Charles Munns, Lieutenant General Michelle Johnson, Vice Admiral Robert Harward, Vice Admiral Randy Crites, and Vice Admiral Thomas Copeman III. (Note: Military graduates below the three-star flag rank include Major General Chuck Swannack, Major General William Walker, Major General Sharon K.G. Dunbar, and Major General Tom Waskow.)

== Legacy ==
MIT president Susan Hockfield called Seminar XXI a "legendary program". The Seminar XXI director stated in 2010 that the seminar was successful due to five factors: its "innovative approach" in using multiple perspectives to understand foreign policy, its intended audience of current or rising leaders, its faculty of "world-renowned" experts, its loyal alumni, and efforts to maintain currency.

Admiral James Stavridis called it a "marvelous opportunity" with important networking opportunities that provided him "the solid underpinnings of how the world of foreign policy works".

The Seminar has affected various members of the U.S. government interagency. Ambassador Harry Thomas called it a "unique opportunity" and "an enriching experience which allowed me to bring new proposals to the never-ending challenges we face in the Department of State." Foreign Service officer Meghan Gregonis called the seminar a "first rate program" and noted that it "broadened my perspective, and ... sharpened my focus".

== Bibliography ==
- Art, Robert (September 2015). "From the Director". MIT.
- Berger, Suzanne; Stewart, Jake W.; Wertheim, Mitzi. "25th Anniversary: Founders' Message". MIT.
- English, Michelle (May 28, 2020). "Robert Art Retires as Director of the Seminar XXI Program". MIT.
- Hockfield, Susan (August 2010). "Letter from MIT President Susan Hockfield". Massachusetts Institute of Technology.
- MIT. "Find Alumni". MIT.
- MIT. "MIT Seminar XXI: Beginnings". MIT.
- MIT. "MIT Seminar XXI: Faculty". MIT.
- MIT. "Faculty and Sessions 94–95". MIT.
- MIT. "Faculty and Sessions 96–97". MIT.
- MIT. "Faculty and Sessions 06–07". MIT.
- MIT. "Faculty and Sessions 09–10". MIT.
- MIT. "Class of 2022". MIT.
- MIT Center for International Studies (2023). MIT Seminar XXI: Foreign Politics, International Relations and the National Interest: 2023–2024 Class. Cambridge, Massachusetts: Massachusetts Institute of Technology.
- MIT. "Admissions". MIT.
- Munsch, Stuart (July 22, 2022). "Admiral Stuart Munsch". U.S. Navy.
- Shapiro, Zach (February 21, 2023). "Announcing MIT Seminar XXI Opportunity for Coast Guard Members". U.S. Coast Guard.
- U.S. Navy (January 28, 2022). "MIT Seminar XXI Class of Academic Year 2022–2023 Call For Applications". www.navy.mil. U.S. Navy.
