= Charles L. Munns =

American admiral (born 1950)

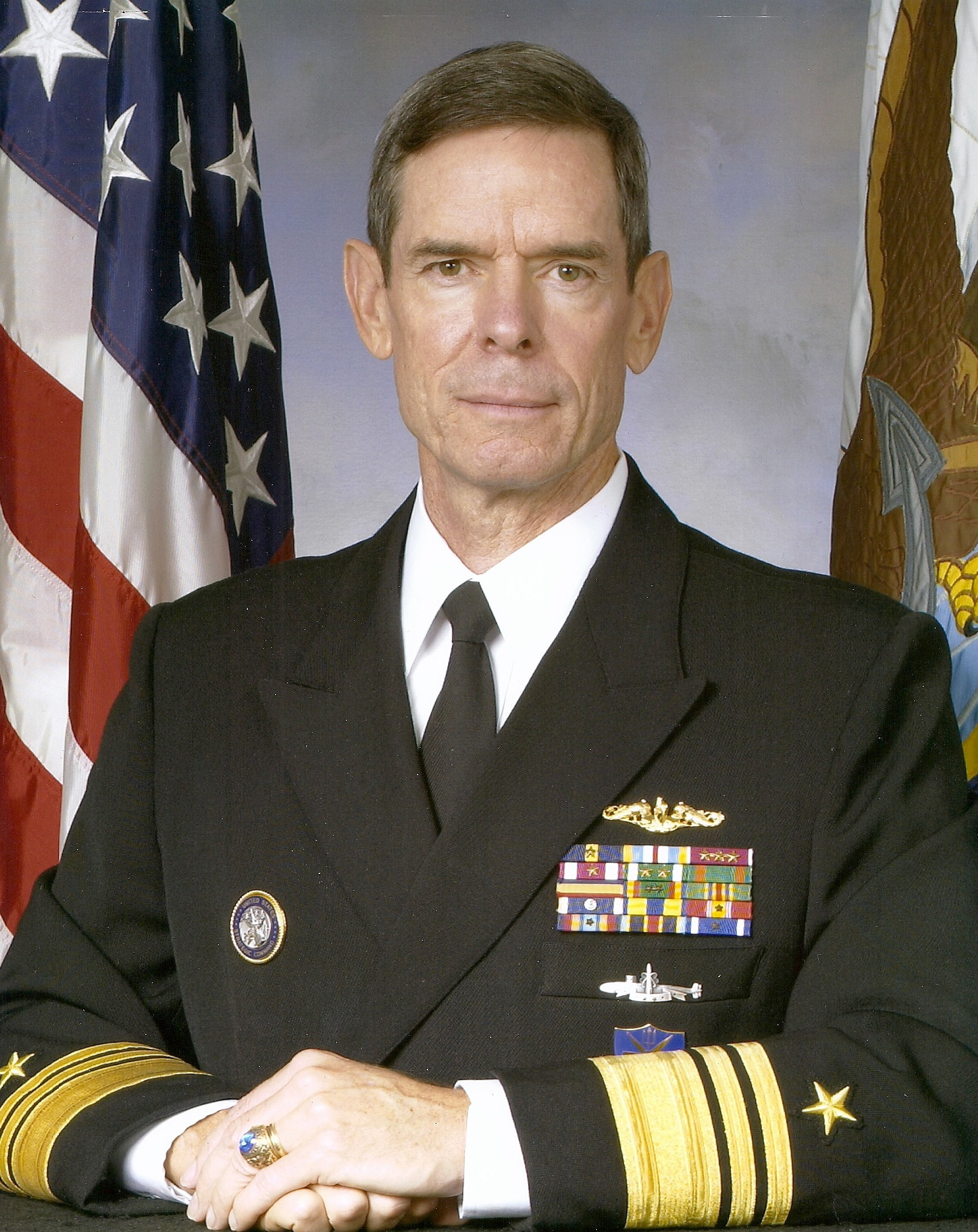
- Vice Admiral Charles L. Munns (retired)
- Born: June 14, 1950 (age 76); Minneapolis-St. Paul, MN
- Military career
- Allegiance: United States
- Branch: United States Navy
- Service years: 1973-2007 (34 years)
- Rank: Vice Admiral
- Nickname: Chuck
- Awards: Distinguished Service Medal (two awards); Legion of Merit (five awards); Meritorious Service Medal (two awards); Navy and Marine Corps Commendation Medal (three awards); Navy and Marine Corps Achievement Medal

Charles L. Munns (born June 14, 1950), retired as a Vice Admiral in the United States Navy. Munns held several posts including Commander, United States Submarine Forces (COMNAVSUBFOR) and Commander, Submarine Force Atlantic (COMSUBLANT). Munns served as commander of the U.S. submarine force from 2004 to 2007.

For the academic year 2023–2024 academic year, Munns serves as the Executive in Residence for the University of South Carolina Aiken School of Business Administration.

== Education ==
Munns graduated with distinction in 1973 from the United States Naval Academy with a bachelor of science degree, majoring in physics.

Munns received a master's of science in Computer Science from the University of Colorado in 1980. He attended MIT's Seminar XXI on Foreign Politics and International Relations from 1993 to 1994.

In May 2018, he received an honorary doctorate of public service from the University of South Carolina.

In 2018, Munns was inducted into the West Des Moines Valley High School's Hall of Honor.

== Military career ==
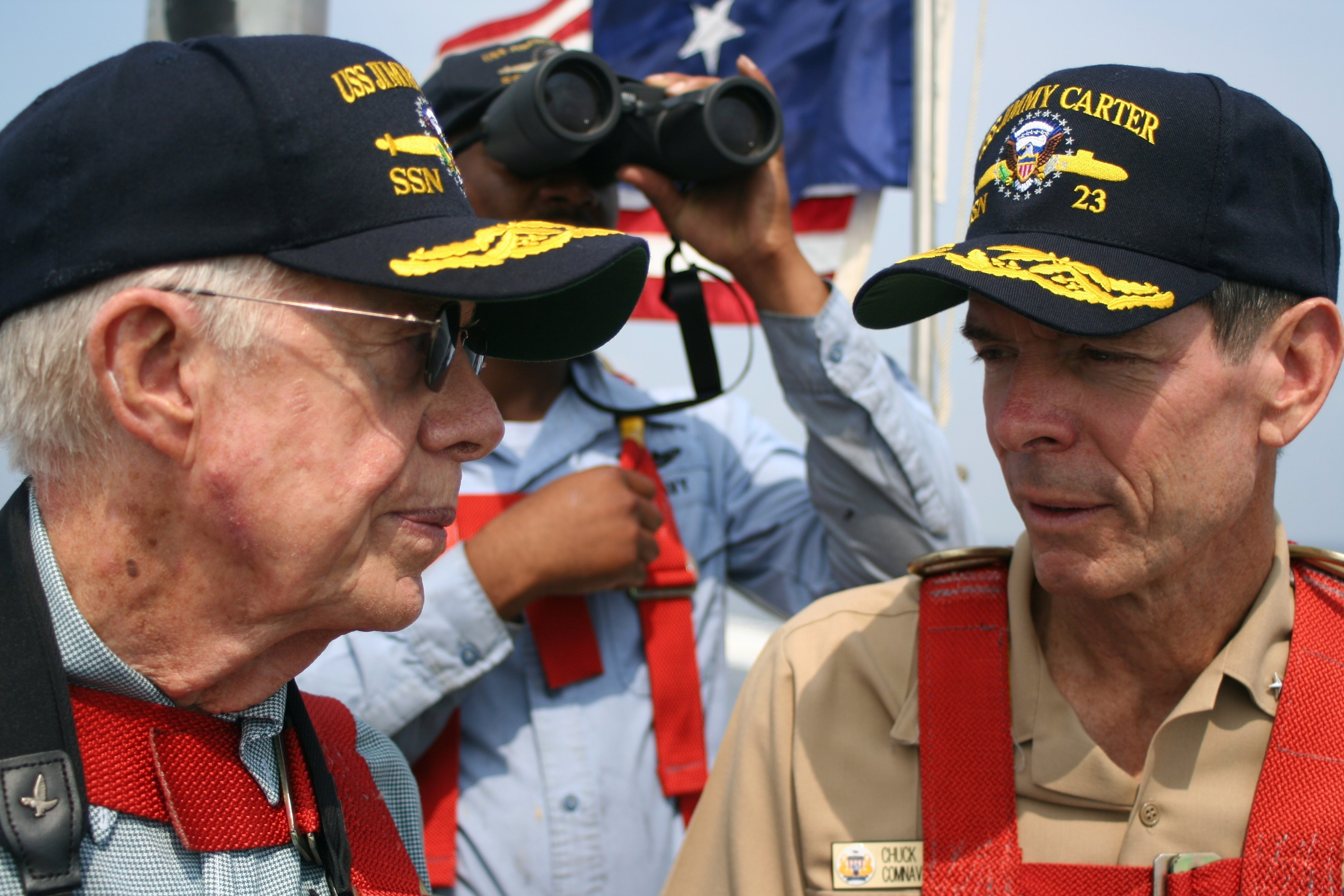
Former President Jimmy Carter speaks with Commander, Submarine Force, U.S. Atlantic Fleet, Vice Adm. Charles Munns, as they ride out to sea on the bridge aboard the Seawolf-class submarine USS Jimmy Carter.

Munns served in the following positions:

- Division Officer, USS Seadragon (SSN-584), November 1974-May 1978
- Instructor, NROTC Unit University of Colorado, August 1978-December 1980
- Engineer, USS Ethan Allen (SSN-608), August 1981-March 1983
- Navigator, USS New York City (SSN-696), May 1983-October 1984
- Executive Officer, USS Florida (SSBN-728) (Blue), January 1985-January 1987
- Executive Assistant to the Deputy Chief of Staff, CINCPACFLT, February 1987-March 1989
- Commanding Officer, USS Richard B. Russell (SSN-687), April 1990-October 1992
- Commander, Submarine Development Squadron Twelve, July 1994-August 1995
- Fellow, CNO Strategic Studies Group, September 1995
- Chief of Staff, Commander Submarine Force U.S. Pacific Fleet, July 1996-May 1998
- Deputy Chief of Staff for C4I, Resources, Requirements, and Assessments (N6N8) on the staff of the Commander, U.S. Pacific Fleet, April 1998-May 2000
- Commander Submarine Group Eight; Commander Submarines, Allied Naval Forces South; Commander, Submarine Force Sixth Fleet (CTF 69); and Commander, Fleet Ballistic Missile Submarine Force (CTF 164), June 2000
- Director, Navy Marine Corps Intranet (NMCI)
- Commander, United States Submarine Forces, 2004–2007

== See also ==
- United States Fleet Forces Command
- Submarines in the United States Navy
- Virginia-class submarine
- List of submarine classes of the United States Navy

Military offices
Preceded by Kirk H. Donald	ComNavSubFor; 2004-2007	Succeeded by John J. Donnelly
