= Patrick M. Walsh =

United States Navy admiral

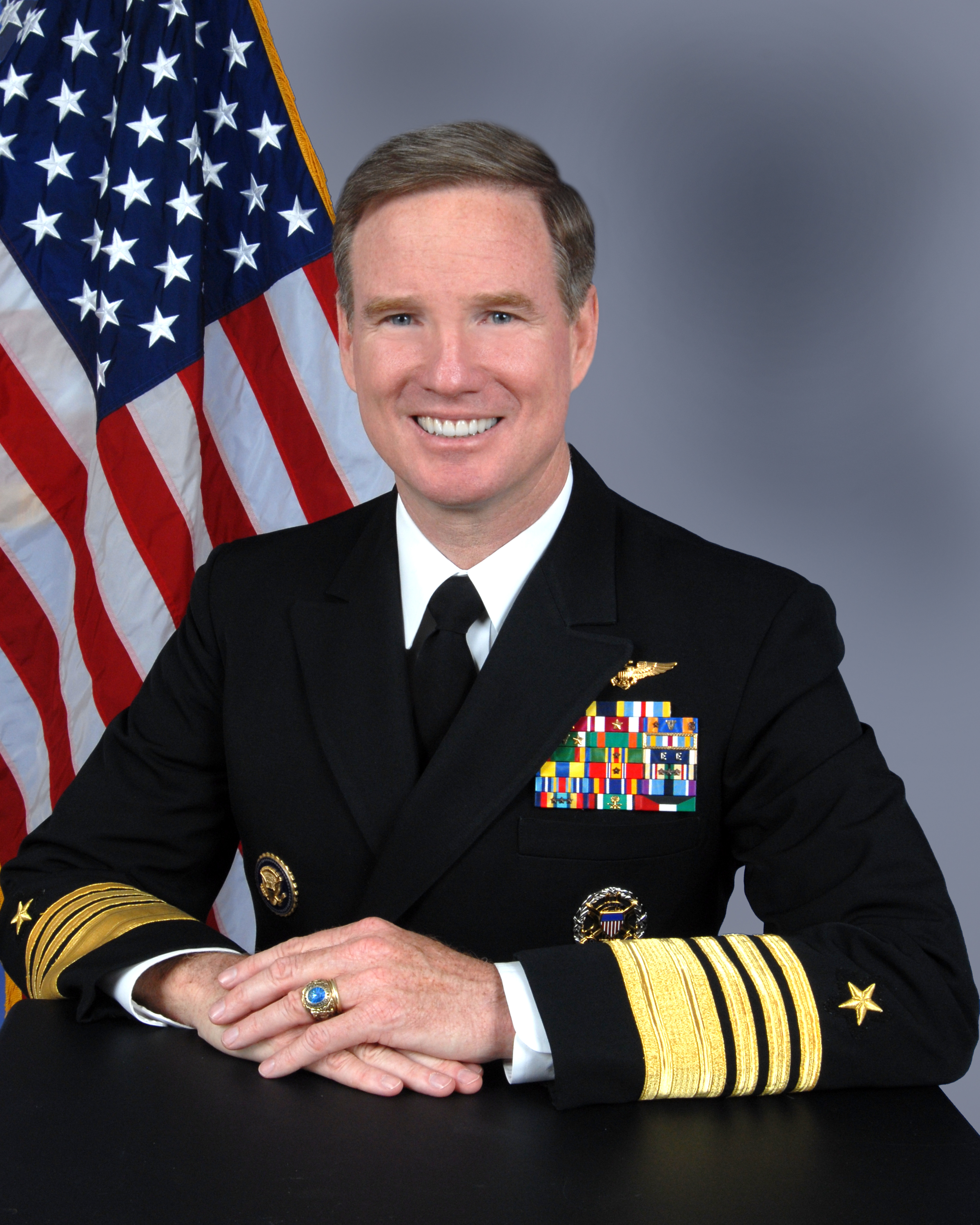
- Admiral Patrick M. Walsh (Ret.)
- Born: Patrick Michael Walsh; January 13, 1955 (age 71)
- Military career
- Branch: United States Navy
- Service years: 1977–2012
- Rank: Admiral
- Commands: U.S. Pacific Fleet; Vice Chief of Naval Operations; U.S. 5th Fleet; U.S. Naval Forces Central Command; Carrier Group Seven/John C. Stennis Strike Group; Carrier Air Wing One; VFA-105
- Conflicts: First Persian Gulf War; Post Gulf War; Operation Provide Comfort; Operation Southern Watch; Bosnian War; Operation Deny Flight; War on terror; Afghanistan Campaign; Horn of Africa Campaign; Second Persian Gulf War
- Awards: Navy Distinguished Service Medal (3); Defense Superior Service Medal; Legion of Merit (4)

Patrick Michael Walsh (born January 13, 1955) is a former United States Navy four-star admiral who last served as the 59th Commander of the U.S. Pacific Fleet from September 25, 2009 to January 20, 2012. He served as the 35th Vice Chief of Naval Operations from April 5, 2007 to August 13, 2009, and as Commander of the U.S. Naval Forces Central Command and Commander, U.S. 5th Fleet from October 2005 to February 27, 2007. He retired from the Navy with over 34 years of service.

== Biography ==
=== Education ===
Walsh graduated with honors from Jesuit College Preparatory in Dallas, Texas, and was the second student in the sixty-year history of the school to receive both the Distinguished Graduate and Distinguished Alumnus awards. He graduated from the United States Naval Academy in 1977 with a Bachelor of Science degree. He attended graduate studies in the International Relations curriculum at the Fletcher School of Law and Diplomacy, Tufts University, as part of the Admiral Arthur S. Moreau Scholarship Program. Walsh graduated first in his class and received a Master of Arts in Law and Diplomacy degree, entered the Doctorate Program with distinction and subsequently received a PhD.

=== United States Navy career ===
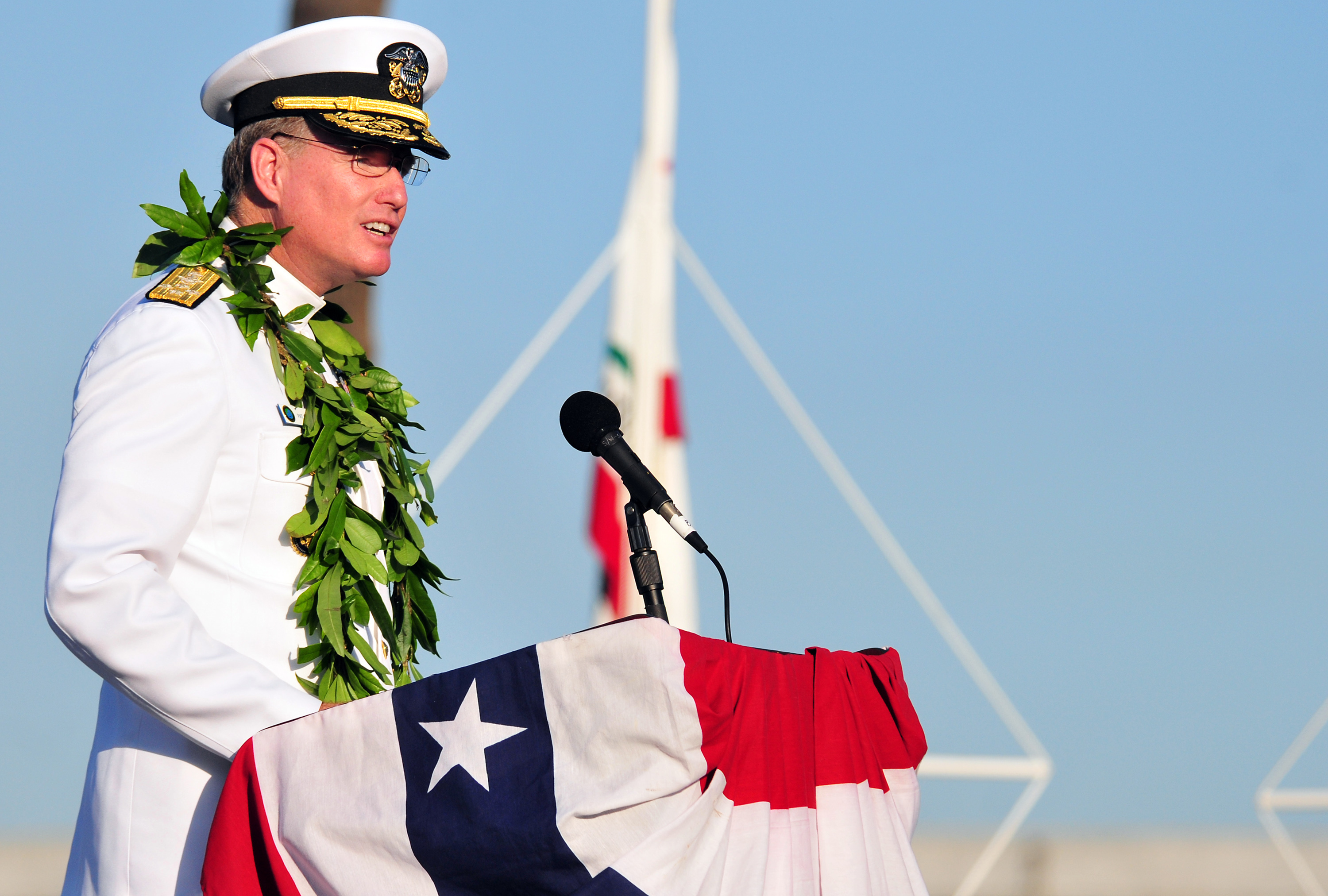
Walsh delivers remarks during a ceremony commemorating the 69th anniversary of Japanese attack on Pearl Harbor on December 7, 2010.

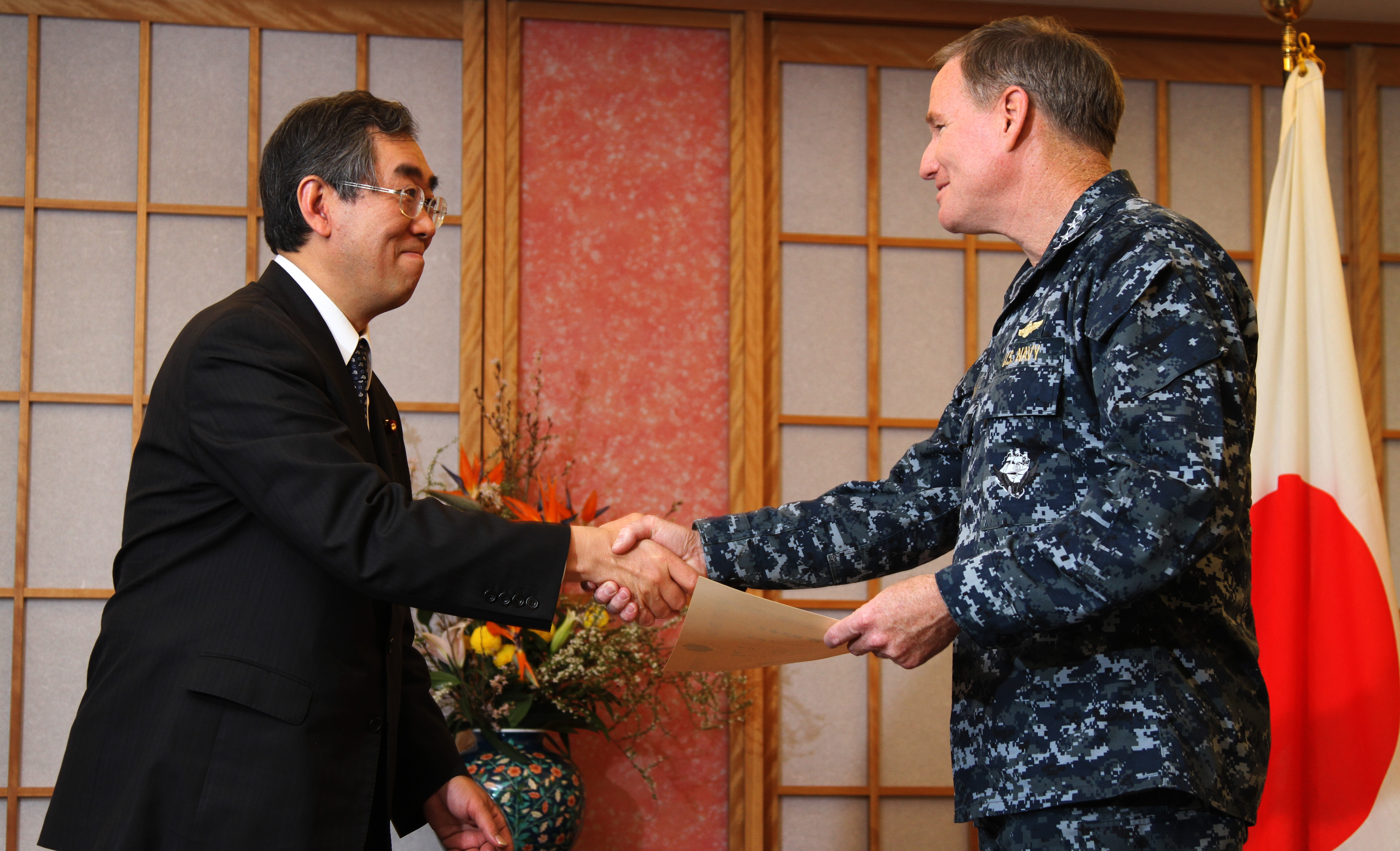
Walsh with Takeaki Matsumoto, the Japanese Minister for Foreign Affairs on April 11, 2011.

After designation as a Naval Aviator, Walsh began operational flying with the "Golden Dragons" of Attack Squadron 192, deployed to the Indian Ocean aboard the aircraft carrier USS America and was later selected by Commander, Light Attack Wing Pacific, as the Junior Officer/Tailhook Pilot of the Year. He then reported to Air Test and Evaluation Squadron 5 as an Operational Test Director until selection to the Navy Flight Demonstration Squadron, "Blue Angels," where he flew the Left Wingman and Slot Pilot positions. When he returned to the fleet, Walsh joined the "Golden Warriors" of Strike-Fighter Squadron 87 as the Operations Officer and flew combat missions in support of Operations Desert Storm and Provide Comfort from the carrier USS Theodore Roosevelt.

Walsh commanded the "Gunslingers" of Strike-Fighter Squadron 105 for missions in support of Operations Southern Watch and Deny Flight from USS Dwight D. Eisenhower. He commanded Carrier Air Wing 1 for deployment in support of Operation Southern Watch aboard USS John F. Kennedy. He also commanded Carrier Group Seven of the John C. Stennis Strike Group for a deployment to the western Pacific Ocean. Most recently, he commanded U.S. Naval Forces Central Command and U.S. 5th Fleet, while also commanding the Combined Maritime Forces conducting Operations Enduring Freedom, Iraqi Freedom and maritime security operations in the Central Command area of responsibility.

Walsh was a Special Assistant to the Director of the Office of Management and Budget as a White House Fellow. He chaired the Department of Leadership, Ethics and Law at the U.S. Naval Academy, served as the Executive Assistant to the Chief of Naval Personnel, and reported to the Joint Staff for his first flag assignment as the Deputy Director for Strategy and Policy, (J-5). He also served concurrently as the Director, Navy Quadrennial Defense Review and Director, Navy Programming Division.

On February 3, 2009, Secretary of Defense Robert Gates selected Walsh to conduct a 30-day review of operations at the U.S. detention center at Guantanamo Bay, Cuba, following President Barack Obama's order that the detention center be closed within one year.

== Awards and decorations ==
- Naval Aviator Badge
- Presidential Service Badge
- Office of the Joint Chiefs of Staff Identification Badge

| Navy Distinguished Service Medal (with 2 golden award stars) |
| Defense Superior Service Medal |
| Legion of Merit (with 3 award stars) |
| Meritorious Service Medal (with 1 award star) |
| Air Medal (1 individual award (denoted by bronze star) with Combat V as well as bronze Strike/Flight numeral 5) |
| Navy Commendation Medal (with Combat V and 2 award stars) |
| Navy Achievement Medal |
| Joint Meritorious Unit Award |
| Navy Unit Commendation |
| Navy Meritorious Unit Commendation (with 1 service star) |
| Navy "E" Ribbon w/ 2 Battle E devices |
| Navy Expeditionary Medal |
| National Defense Service Medal (with 1 service star) |
| Southwest Asia Service Medal (with 3 service stars) |
| Global War on Terrorism Expeditionary Medal |
| Global War on Terrorism Service Medal |
| Humanitarian Service Medal |
| Navy Sea Service Deployment Ribbon (with 3 service stars) |
| Navy Overseas Service Ribbon |
| Grand Cordon of the Order of the Rising Sun (Japan, 1st class, Kyokujitsu-Daijusho (旭日大綬章)) |
| Order of National Security Merit, Tong-il Medal (Republic of Korea) |
| Kuwait Liberation Medal (Saudi Arabia) |
| Kuwait Liberation Medal (Kuwait) |

Military offices
| Preceded by David C. Nichols | Commander of the United States Naval Forces Central Command and United States Fifth Fleet; 2005–2007 | Succeeded by Kevin J. Cosgriff |
| Preceded by Robert F. Willard | Vice Chief of Naval Operations; 2007–2009 | Succeeded by Jonathan W. Greenert |
| Preceded by Robert F. Willard | Commander of the United States Pacific Fleet; 2009–2012 | Succeeded by Cecil D. Haney |
