= Kelly Greenhill =

American political scientist

- Born: 1970
- Education: University of California at Berkeley BA; Massachusetts Institute of Technology PhD
- Occupation: Political Scientist
- Notable work: Weapons of Mass Migration: Forced Displacement, Coercion, and Foreign Policy

Kelly M. Greenhill (born 1970) is an American political scientist. She is an associate professor at Tufts University and a research fellow at the Harvard Kennedy School of Government Belfer Center for Science and International Affairs. She specializes in weaponized migration, forced displacement, and foreign policy.

== Education ==
She has an S.M. and a Ph.D. from the Massachusetts Institute of Technology and a B.A. in Political Economy and in Scandinavian Studies from the University of California at Berkeley. She also earned a C.S.S. from Harvard University.

== Career ==
Besides her professorship at Tufts University, she served as associate editor for the academic journals International Security from 2015 to 2020 and Security Studies from 2011 to 2015. She was Founding Convener and Chair of the Conflict, Security and Public Policy Working Group at Harvard University's Belfer Center from 2010 to 2020.

She has written for International Security, Security Studies, and Civil Wars, among others, as well as the New York Times, Foreign Affairs, the Los Angeles Times, the International Herald Tribune and the BBC. Her book Weapons of Mass Migration was 2011 winner of the Best Book of the Year Award of the International Studies Association.

She also serves as a consultant for US governmental agencies and non-governmental organizations.

== Works ==
=== As author ===
- Weapons of Mass Migration: Forced Displacement, Coercion, and Foreign Policy, Cornell University Press, 2011.

=== As co-editor ===
- The Use of Force: Military Power and International Politics, Rowman & Littlefield; 8th edition 2015, with Robert J. Art as co-editor.
- Sex, Drugs, and Body Counts: The Politics of Numbers in Global Crime and Conflict, Cornell University Press 2010, with Peter Andreas as co-editor.
