= William H. Hilarides =

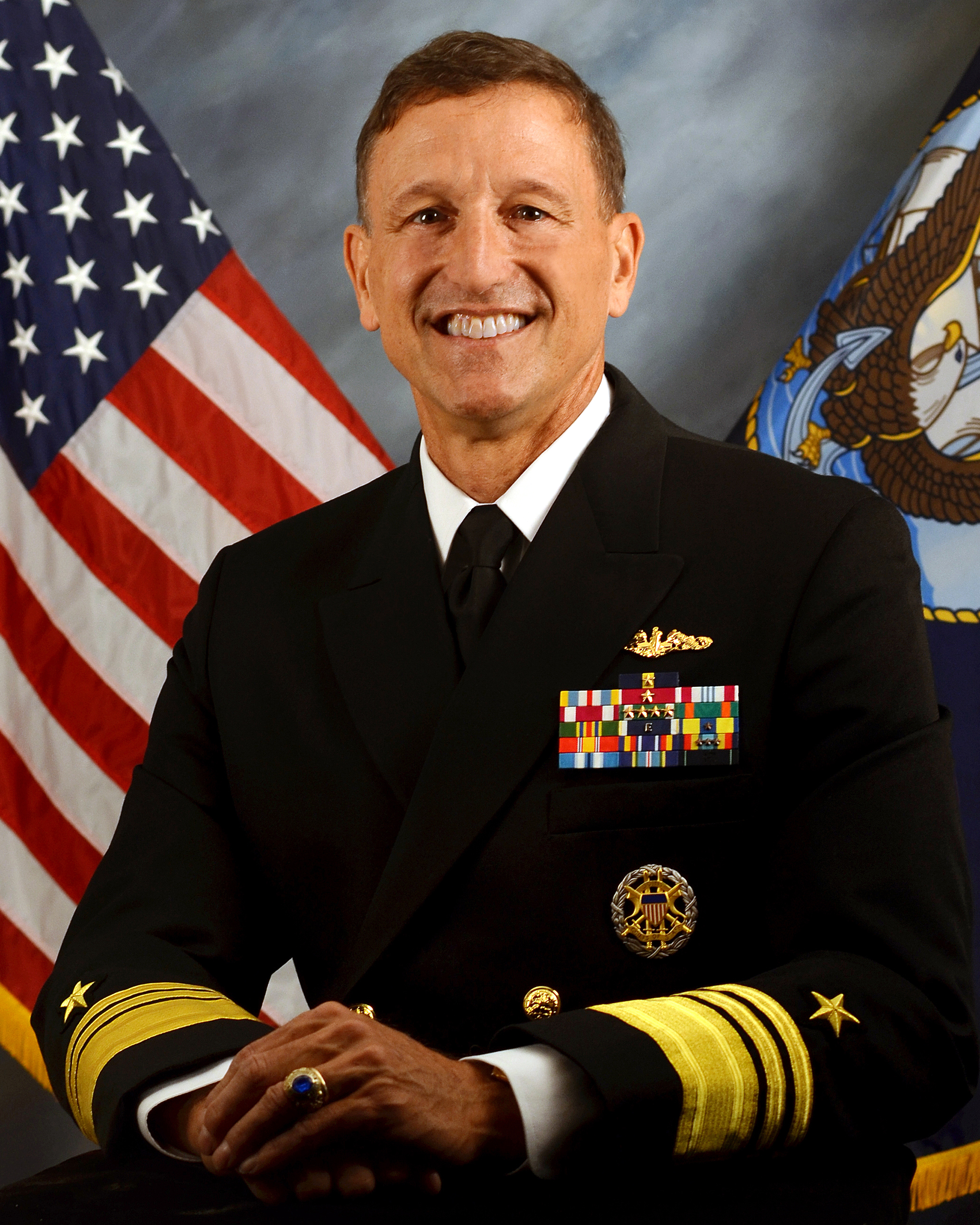
Official portrait

William Hunter Hilarides (born 1959) is a former Vice Admiral in the United States Navy.

== Early life and education ==
He attended Amos Alonzo Stagg High School in Palos Hills, IL, where he was voted "Most Likely to Succeed". Raised in Chicago, he graduated from the U.S. Naval Academy in 1981 with a Bachelor of Science in Physics. After graduation, he served as master of the Naval Academy Sailing Squadron sloop Avenger, competing in numerous offshore racing events.

He holds a master's degree in engineering management from the Catholic University of America, completed the Air Force Command and Staff College, MIT Seminar XXI Program in International Security Affairs and numerous acquisition schools.

== Naval career ==
Prior to command, he served at sea aboard USS Pargo, USS Gurnard and USS Maryland, deploying to the North Atlantic, Mediterranean, Arctic and Western Pacific, as well as conducting several strategic deterrent patrols. Ashore, he served on the staff of Commander Submarine Force, U.S. Atlantic Fleet; Bureau of Naval Personnel; Joint Staff; and the staff of the chief of naval operations.

Hilarides commanded USS Key West from May 1998 to November 2000 in Pearl Harbor. While in command, he deployed to the Western Pacific and conducted a major shipyard maintenance period.

Since becoming an acquisition professional in 2002, he has served as director, Advanced Submarine Research and Development, program manager of the SSGN Program and program executive officer for submarines, where he was responsible for all new construction submarine programs, along with the acquisition and life cycle maintenance of submarine weapons, countermeasures, sonar, combat control and imaging systems.

Hilarides became the 43rd commander of Naval Sea Systems Command (NAVSEA) June 7, 2013. As NAVSEA commander, he overseaw a global workforce of more than 56,000 military and civilian personnel responsible for the development, delivery and maintenance of the Navy’s ships, submarines and systems. Hilarides retired on 10 June 2016.

=== Awards ===
Hilarides has received various personal and campaign awards, including the Distinguished Service Medal, the Defense Superior Service Medal, the Legion of Merit and the Meritorious Unit Commendation.
