= VFA-87 =

Strike Fighter Squadron 87 (VFA-87)
- Founded: 1 February 1968; 58 years ago
- Country: United States
- Branch: United States Navy
- Type: Fighter/Attack
- Role: Close air support Air interdiction Aerial reconnaissance
- Part of: Carrier Air Wing Eight
- Garrison/HQ: NAS Oceana
- Nickname: Golden Warriors
- Motto: "War Party Rocks!!!"
- Colors
- Mascot: Native American Warrior
- Engagements: Vietnam War; Operation Urgent Fury; Multinational Force in Lebanon; Operation Desert Storm; Operation Provide Comfort; Operation Southern Watch; Operation Deny Flight; Operation Deliberate Force; Operation Allied Force; Operation Enduring Freedom; Operation Iraqi Freedom; Operation New Dawn; Operation Inherent Resolve; Operation Southern Spear; Operation Epic Fury
- Website: https://www.airlant.usff.navy.mil/vfa87/

Commanders
- Commanding Officer: CDR John C. Schnepper, USN
- Executive Officer: CDR Brandon S. Rodgers, USN
- Command Master Chief: CMDCM (SW/FMF) Jason T. Snyder
- Notable commanders: Timothy J. Keating Patrick Walsh Dominic Gorie

Insignia
- Call Sign: War Party
- Tail Code: AJ

Aircraft flown
- Attack: A-7B/E Corsair (1968 - 1986)
- Fighter: F/A-18A/C/A+ Hornet (1986-2015); F/A-18E Super Hornet (2015-present)

The Strike Fighter Squadron 87 (VFA-87) is a United States Navy strike fighter squadron based at Naval Air Station Oceana. The squadron is equipped with the Boeing F/A-18E Super Hornet and is nicknamed the Golden Warriors, its call sign is War Party. Currently, the squadron is assigned to Carrier Air Wing 8 (tail code "AJ").

The squadron's patch is seen worn by Miles Teller in Top Gun: Maverick.

== Insignia and Nickname ==
The squadron's insignia and nickname were approved by CNO on 29 July 1968 and have remained essentially unchanged.

== History ==
=== 1960s ===
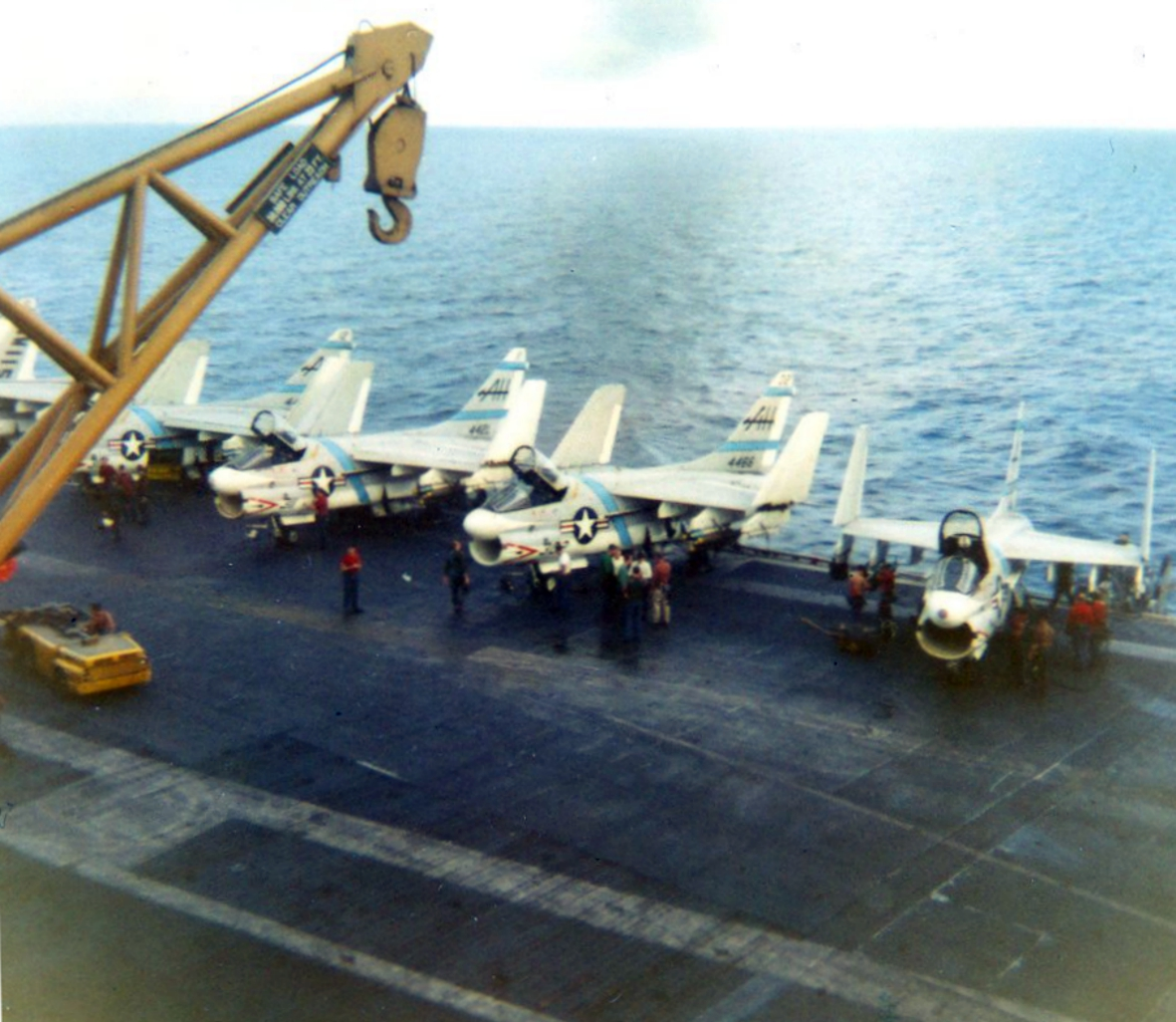
Corsairs from VA-87 on USS Ticonderoga in 1969.

In June 1968, the squadron was established as VA-87, an attack aircraft squadron and the first fleet squadron to fly the LTV A-7 Corsair II, at NAS Cecil Field, Florida. In March 1969, the squadron flew its first combat missions from USS Ticonderoga, striking targets in South Vietnam. In April 1969 following the shoot down of a Navy EC-121 Warning Star aircraft by the North Koreans, Ticonderoga, with VA-87 embarked, was ordered to the Sea of Japan.

=== 1970s ===
In the 1970s, VA-87 made 12 deployments aboard three different carriers—USS Franklin D. Roosevelt, USS America and USS Independence.

In 1973, the squadron protected U.S. interests during the Yom Kippur War. Transitioning to the improved A-7E Corsair II, the squadron returned in October 1976 to the Middle East following the assassination of the American ambassador to Lebanon Francis E. Meloy Jr, assisting in the evacuation of U.S. citizens, while embarked on America.

=== 1980s ===
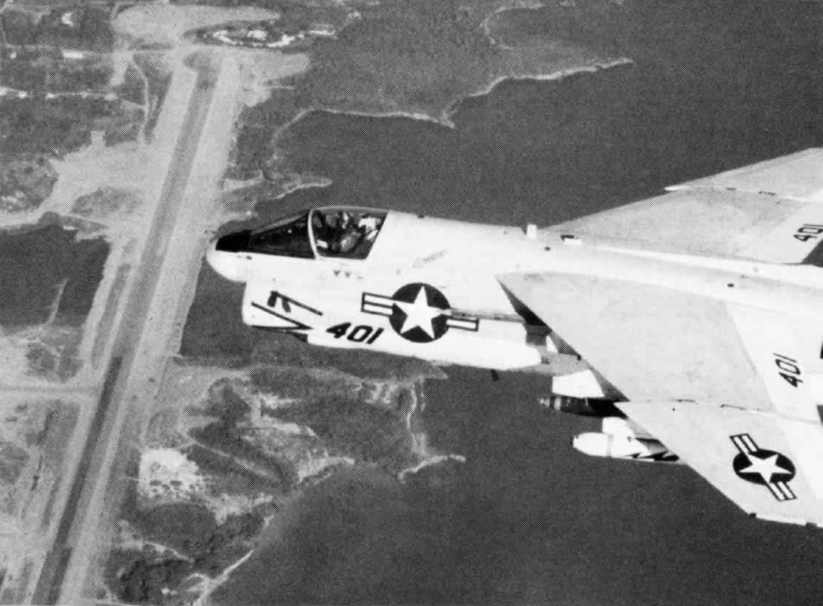
A VA-87 A-7E over Grenada, in 1983.

During the Iran hostage crisis and the Israeli-Syrian disputes of 1981, VA-87 deployed to the region for 195 days aboard Independence. One year later the squadron returned, supporting U.S. peacekeeping operations in Lebanon.

In October 1983, the squadron participated in Operation Urgent Fury in Grenada. During the same deployment, VA-87 participated in strikes against Syria in response to hostile fire against U.S. reconnaissance aircraft from Syrian positions in Lebanon.

On 24 October 1986, the squadron transitioned to the F/A-18A Hornet and was redesignated Strike Fighter Squadron 87 (VFA-87).

=== 1990s ===
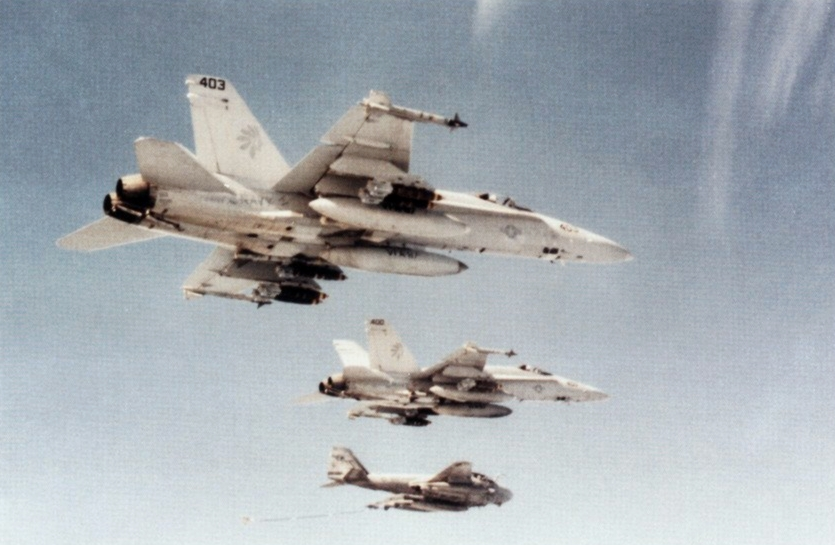
F/A-18As of VFA-87 during a raid over Iraq, in 1991.

On 28 December 1990, following the Iraqi invasion of Kuwait, the squadron deployed for Operation Desert Storm, flying 629 sorties over 43 days of intense combat.

The squadron, equipped with the newer F/A-18C, deployed to the Adriatic Sea and Red Sea from March to September 1993, flying hundreds of missions in support of United Nations Operation Deny Flight, Operation Provide Comfort and Operation Southern Watch. Embarked for the last time on Theodore Roosevelt, VFA-87 returned in March 1995 to Southwest Asia for a month to participate in Operation Southern Watch.

Following a hasty transit to the Adriatic, the squadron spent four months flying combat sorties over the increasingly embattled former Yugoslavia. On 30 August 1995, squadron jets were the first to strike Bosnian Serb targets as the Operation Deliberate Force campaign commenced.

VFA-87 again headed to the Adriatic to fly over Bosnia-Herzegovina in support of Operation Deliberate Guard and again in Operation Southern Watch before coming home in October 1997 to Naval Air Station Cecil Field for the last time in the squadron's history. The squadron was forced to relocate to NAS Oceana, in Virginia Beach, Virginia from NAS Cecil Field in Jacksonville, Florida due to a 1993 post-Cold War Base Realignment and Closure Commission (BRAC) decision mandating the closure of NAS Cecil Field by 1 Oct 1999.

The Golden Warriors made history again by participating in combat operations in two different theaters during a single deployment, operating from USS Theodore Roosevelt. While en route to the Persian Gulf in April 1999, crisis erupted in the former Yugoslavian republic of Kosovo, prompting the largest aerial bombing campaign since the Vietnam War. In just 68 days, Golden Warrior F/A-18s dropped 430,000 pounds of ordnance and flew 595 combat missions during Operation Allied Force, contributing to a NATO victory, and expelling Serbian oppressors from the war-torn province of Kosovo. In July, VFA-87 returned to the Persian Gulf and flew 176 combat missions in support of Operation Southern Watch. The Golden Warriors returned to their first new home in over thirty years, NAS Oceana in Virginia Beach, Virginia.

=== 2000s ===
In April 2001, VFA-87 deployed on a Persian Gulf cruise enforcing the no fly zone over Southern Iraq aboard USS Enterprise until the September 11 attacks occurred. The squadron was then held on station along with the entire Enterprise battle group, to conduct first strike combat missions over Afghanistan against embedded Taliban targets. VFA-87 returned to NAS Oceana in November 2001.

==== Iraq and Afghanistan ====
In January 2003, USS Theodore Roosevelt battle group along with VFA-87 conducted combat operations over Iraq, initiating Operation Iraqi Freedom.

VFA-87 deployed again in September 2005 aboard Theodore Roosevelt, returning on 11 March 2006, and received the Atlantic Fleet "Battle E" award later that year.

In September 2006, the squadron transitioned from the F/A-18C to the F/A-18A+ and was again named the "Battle E" squadron for the Atlantic Fleet in March 2007. It deployed again in September 2008 to the North Arabian Sea, in support of Operation Enduring Freedom and returned home to NAS Oceana on 18 April 2009.

=== 2010s ===
2010 was a year of significant accomplishment for the squadron. VFA-87 participated in three embarked periods in preparation for the maiden deployment of USS George H. W. Bush, including a deck qualification, Independent Steaming Exercise (ISE), and Tailored Ship's Training Assessment (TSTA). Additionally the "War Party" completed three command detachments; one to NAS Key West for the Air-to-Air Strike Fighter Advanced Readiness Program (SFARP) and two to NAS Fallon for Air-to-Ground SFARP.

In May 2011, VFA-87 departed on a deployment aboard USS George H. W. Bush. While deployed the squadron flew combat missions in support of Operations Enduring Freedom and New Dawn flying over Afghanistan and Iraq respectively in support of combat troops on the ground.

In 2012 VFA-87 successfully completed four operational detachments, transitioned back to the F/A-18C by transferring 10 F/A-18A+ and accepting 11 F/A-18C aircraft. The squadron made another deployment aboard George H. W. Bush to the Mediterranean Sea and the Indian Ocean from February to November 2014. Following this deployment, VFA-87 converted to the F/A-18E Super Hornet.

==== Syria ====
VFA-87 made a single deployment aboard USS George H. W. Bush from January to August 2017. During this desployment, Lieutenant Commander Michael Tremel, flying a VFA-87 F/A-18E shot down a Syrian Su-22 after multiple observed ROE violations on 18 June 2017. The Su-22 had been bombing US-backed forces fighting the Islamic State.

=== 2020s ===
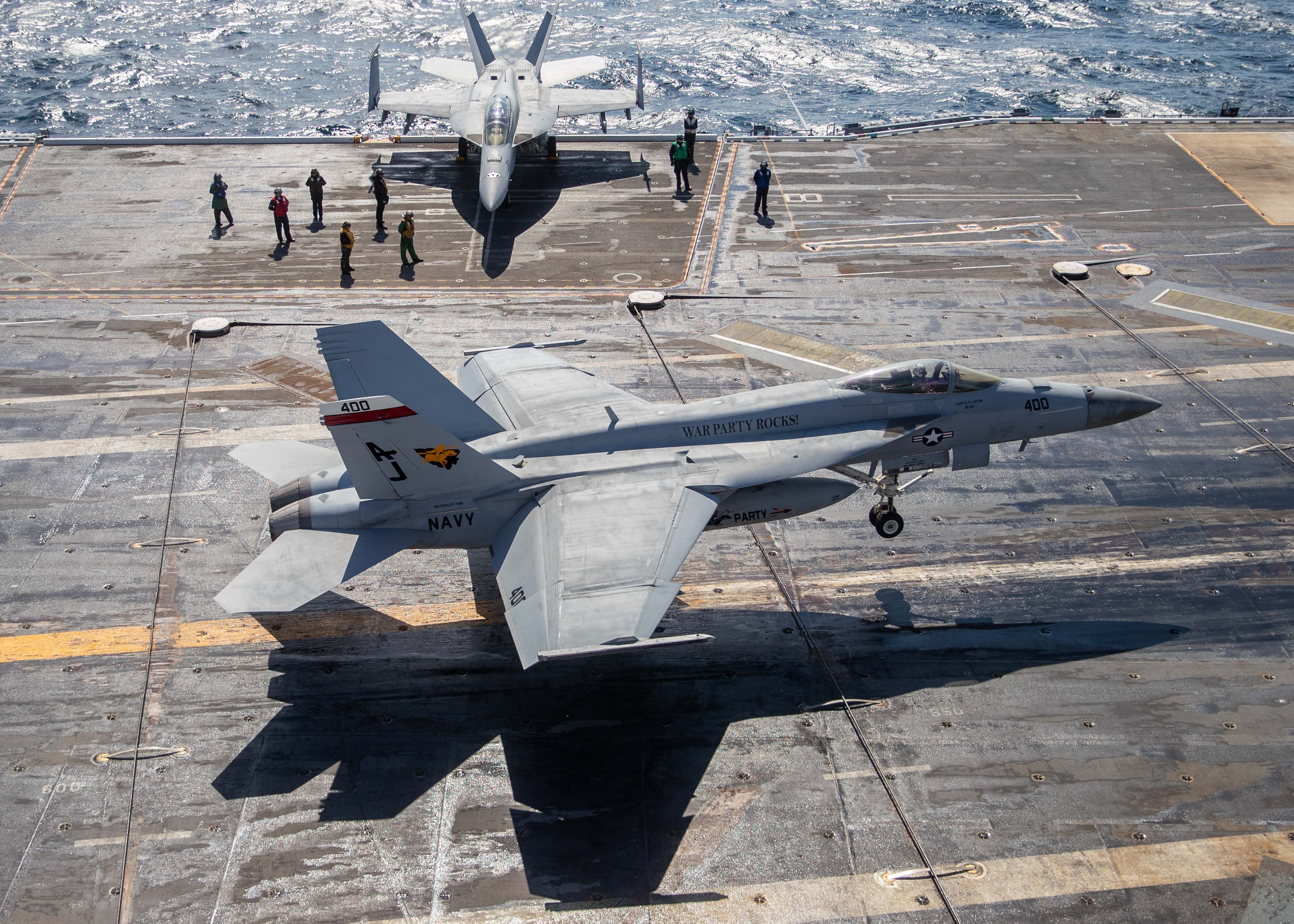
F/A-18E of VFA-87 landing aboard Gerald R. Ford in March 2022.

After having been assigned to CVW-8 since 1988, VFA-87 was re-assigned to Carrier Air Wing 11 in 2020. The squadron made two deployments aboard USS Theodore Roosevelt to the Western Pacific from January and July 2020 and from December to May 2021. Following these deployments, the squadron returned to CVW-8. In 2021, CVW-8 was re-assigned to USS Gerald R. Ford.

In November 2025, VFA-87 within CVW-8 onboard the USS Gerald R Ford were re-tasked from their scheduled deployment in the Mediterranean and sent to the Caribbean to support Operation Southern Spear. After completing their support of Southern Spear in early February 2026, VFA-31 and CVW-8 were again deployed across the Atlantic and into the Mediterranean to support potential combat operations against Iran.

In late Feb 2026, VFA-87 and their F/A-18Es undertook combat sorties within Operation Epic Fury against Iran. Combat sorties off the Ford began from the Eastern Mediterranean and moved to the Red Sea after close to a week of combat.

== Notable squadron members ==
- Dominic L. Pudwill Gorie
- Timothy J. Keating
- Patrick Walsh
- Amanda Lee - first female F/A-18F Super Hornet pilot in the Blue Angels

== See also ==
- Naval aviation
- United States Naval Aviator
- Modern US Navy carrier air operations
- List of United States Navy aircraft squadrons
- List of United States Navy aircraft designations (pre-1962) / List of US Naval aircraft
