= Timothy J. Keating =

American naval admiral (born 1948)

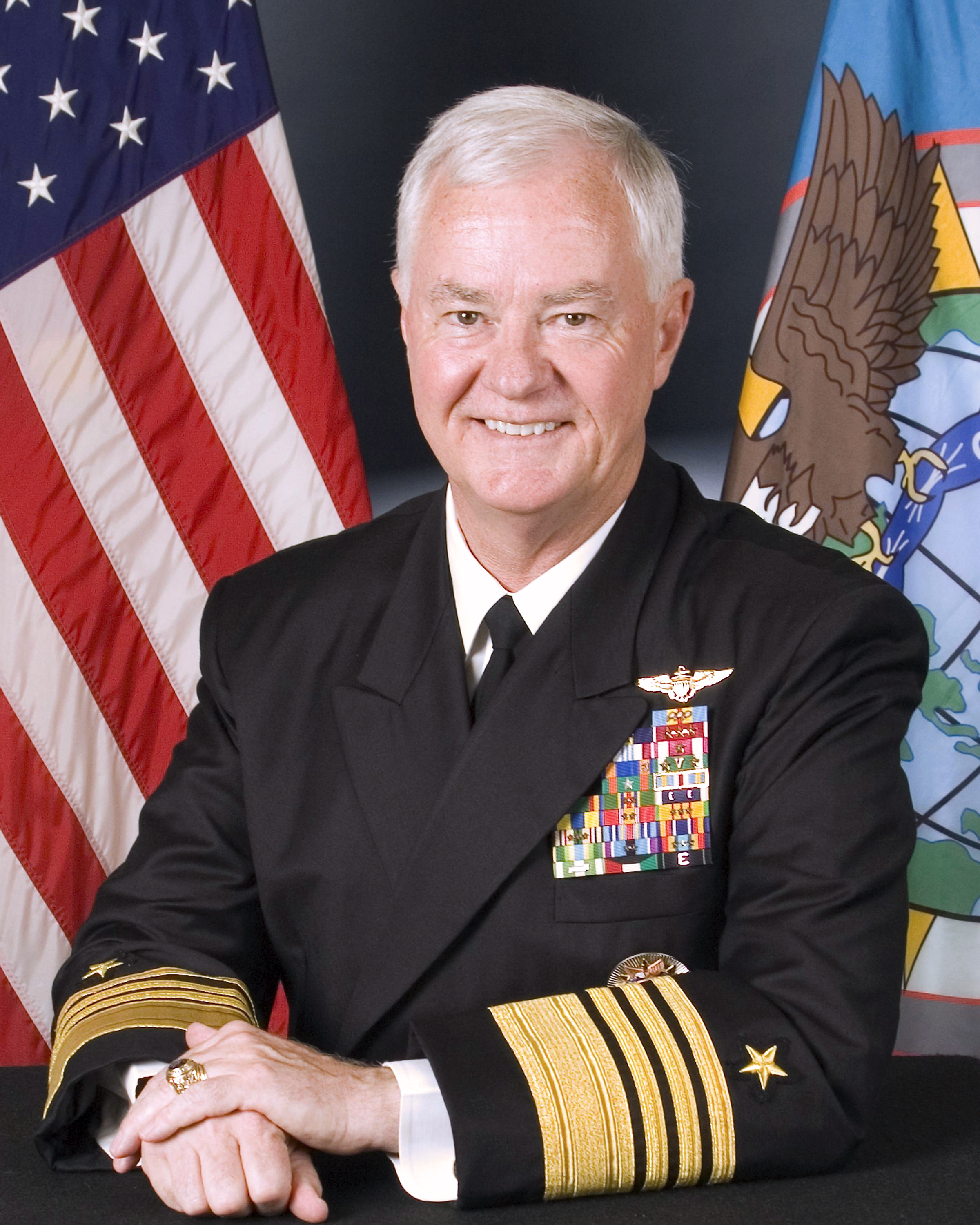
- Admiral Timothy Keating
- Born: November 16, 1948 (age 77); Dayton, Ohio, U.S.
- Military career
- Allegiance: United States
- Branch: United States Navy
- Service years: 1971–2009
- Rank: Admiral
- Commands: United States Pacific Command; United States Northern Command; North American Aerospace Defense Command; United States 5th Fleet; Carrier Group Five; Naval Strike and Air Warfare Center; Carrier Air Wing 9 VFA-87
- Conflicts: Vietnam War; Gulf War
- Awards: Defense Distinguished Service Medal (4); Navy Distinguished Service Medal (2); Legion of Merit (4)

Timothy John Keating (born November 16, 1948) is a retired United States Navy admiral. During his career, he served as commander of Carrier Group Five, the United States 5th Fleet, the United States Northern Command and North American Aerospace Defense Command (NORAD), and United States Pacific Command. He retired in 2009 after more than 38 years of service. He was the first navy officer to head Northern Command and NORAD.

== Early life ==
Keating was born on November 16, 1948, in Dayton, Ohio.

== Naval career ==
Keating graduated from the United States Naval Academy in 1971. Following duty aboard USS Leonard F. Mason (DD-852) in the western Pacific, he completed flight training in August 1973 and was designated as a Naval Aviator. He then served in Attack Squadron 82 (VA-82), flying the A-7 Corsair II, deploying twice to the Mediterranean Sea aboard USS Nimitz (CVN-68).

In September 1978, Keating joined Attack Squadron 122 (VA-122) at NAS Lemoore, California, and later served with Carrier Air Wing FIFTEEN (CVW-15) as Staff Landing Signal Officer, embarking aboard USS Kitty Hawk (CV-63) and deploying to the Western Pacific/Indian Ocean.

From May 1982 to July 1984, as Administrative Officer, Operations Officer and Maintenance Officer of Attack Squadron 94 (VA-94), Keating deployed twice to the Western Pacific aboard USS Enterprise (CVN-65). His next assignment was Aide and Flag Lieutenant to the Commander in Chief, U.S. Pacific Command.

In May 1987, after having transitioned to the F/A-18 Hornet and previously serving as squadron executive officer, Keating assumed command of Strike Fighter Squadron 87 (VFA-87) and deployed with Carrier Air Wing EIGHT (CVW-8) aboard USS Theodore Roosevelt (CVN-71) to the North Atlantic and to the Mediterranean. After his tour with VFA-87, he served as Head of the Aviation Junior Officer Assignments Branch of the Naval Military Personnel Command in Washington, D.C. He next served as Deputy Commander, Carrier Air Wing SEVENTEEN (CVW-17) in January 1991, participating in combat operations in support of Operation Desert Storm from USS Saratoga (CV-60).

Keating then became a Chief of Naval Operations Fellow with the Strategic Studies Group in Newport, Rhode Island. Following duty with the Joint Task Force Southwest Asia in Riyadh, Saudi Arabia, he deployed as Deputy Commander, Carrier Air Wing NINE (CVW-9) aboard USS Nimitz (CVN-68) to the Persian Gulf, assuming command of CVW-9 in July 1993. In November 1994, Admiral Keating became Commander of the Naval Strike and Air Warfare Center at NAS Fallon, Nevada.

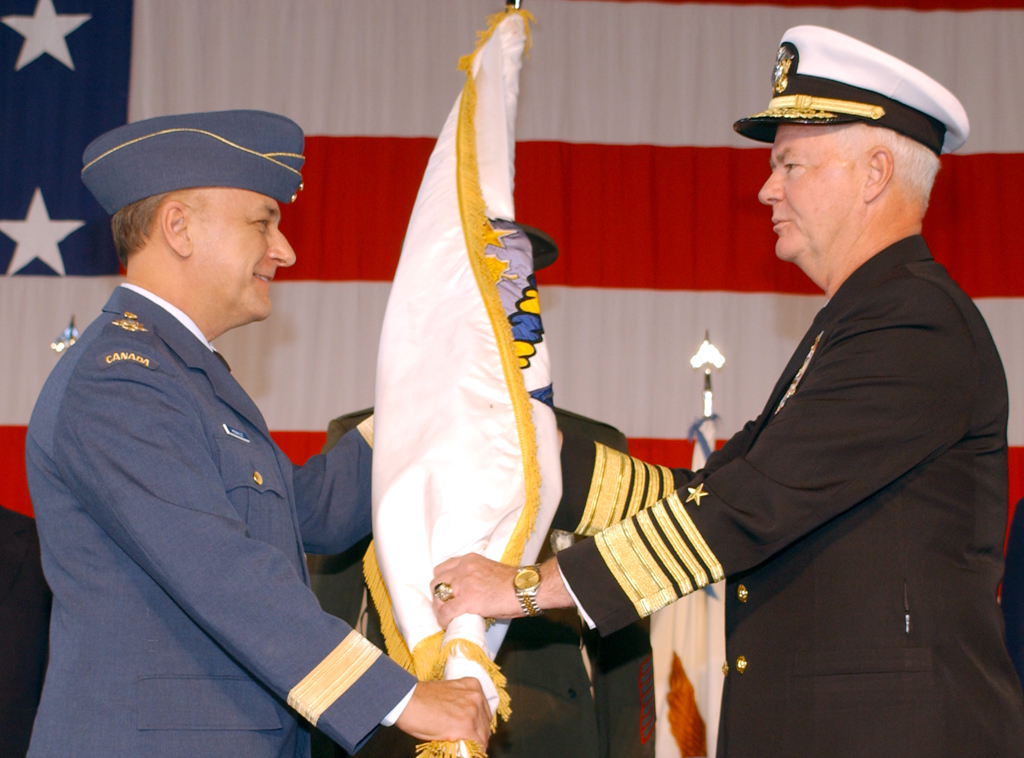
Keating (right) assumes command of NORAD, receiving the command guidon from Canadian General Charles R. Hennault on November 5, 2004.

Keating returned to the Naval Military Personnel Command in September 1995 as Director, Aviation Officer Distribution Division (Pers 43). He then served as the deputy director for Operations (Current Operations/J33), with the Operations Directorate of the Joint Staff (JS J-3) in Washington, D.C., from August 1996 until June 1998. He assumed command of Carrier Group Five, home ported in Yokosuka, Japan, in June 1998, embarking aboard both USS Independence (CV-62) and USS Kitty Hawk (CV-63). In September 2000, Admiral Keating reported to OPNAV in Washington as Deputy Chief of Naval Operations for Plans, Policy and Operations (N3/N5). In February 2002, he assumed command of United States Naval Forces Central Command and United States Fifth Fleet in Manama, Bahrain. From October 13, 2003, to October 21, 2004, Keating served as the Director, Joint Staff. Keating commanded of United States Northern Command and the North American Aerospace Defense Command from 5 November 2004 to 23 March 2007. Keating became Commander, United States Pacific Command on 26 March 2007. He served as ComPac until 19 October 2009, just before his retirement.

== Awards and decorations ==
Keating's awards include:

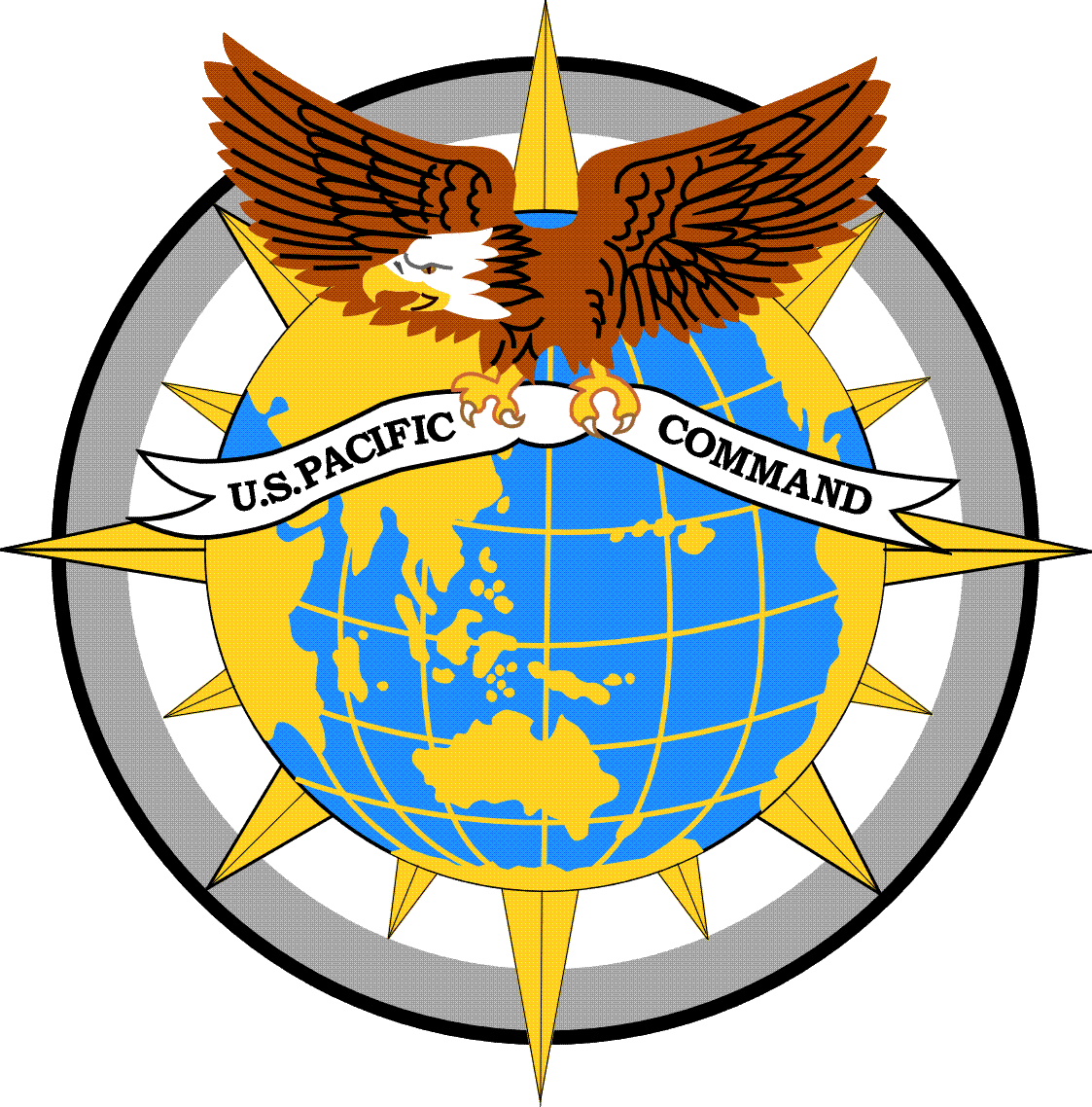
Defense Distinguished Service Medal with 3 Oak Leaf Clusters
Navy Distinguished Service Medal with Gold Star
Legion of Merit with three Gold Stars
Defense Meritorious Service Medal
Meritorious Service Medal with Gold Star
Air Medal with bronze strike/flight numeral 3
Navy Commendation Medal with two Gold Stars and Combat "V"
Navy Achievement Medal with Silver Award Star
Joint Meritorious Unit Award
Navy Unit Commendation
Navy Meritorious Unit Commendation with 2 bronze service stars
Navy "E" Ribbon w/ 2 Battle E devices
Navy Expeditionary Medal
National Defense Service Medal with 2 bronze service stars
Vietnam Service Medal (3 campaign stars)
Southwest Asia Service Medal with 3 bronze service stars
Global War on Terrorism Expeditionary Medal
Global War on Terrorism Service Medal
Armed Forces Service Medal
Humanitarian Service Medal with 2 bronze service stars
Navy Sea Service Deployment Ribbon with 7 service stars
Canada Meritorious Service Cross, Military Division
Order of the Rising Sun, Grand Cross (Japan)
Vietnam Campaign Medal
Kuwait Liberation Medal (Saudi Arabia)
Kuwait Liberation Medal (Government of Kuwait)
Navy Expert Pistol Shot Medal

He also has over 5,000 flight hours and 1,200 arrested landings.

== Personal ==
Keating married Wanda Lee Doerksen. He has two stepchildren.

== Notes ==
Military offices
Preceded by Ralph E. Eberhart	Commander of the North American Aerospace Defense Command; Commander of the United States Northern Command; November 5, 2004 – March 23, 2007	Succeeded by Victor E. Renuart Jr.
Preceded by William J. Fallon	Commander of the United States Pacific Command; March 26, 2007 – October 19, 2009	Succeeded by Robert F. Willard
