= Robert F. Willard =

United States Navy admiral

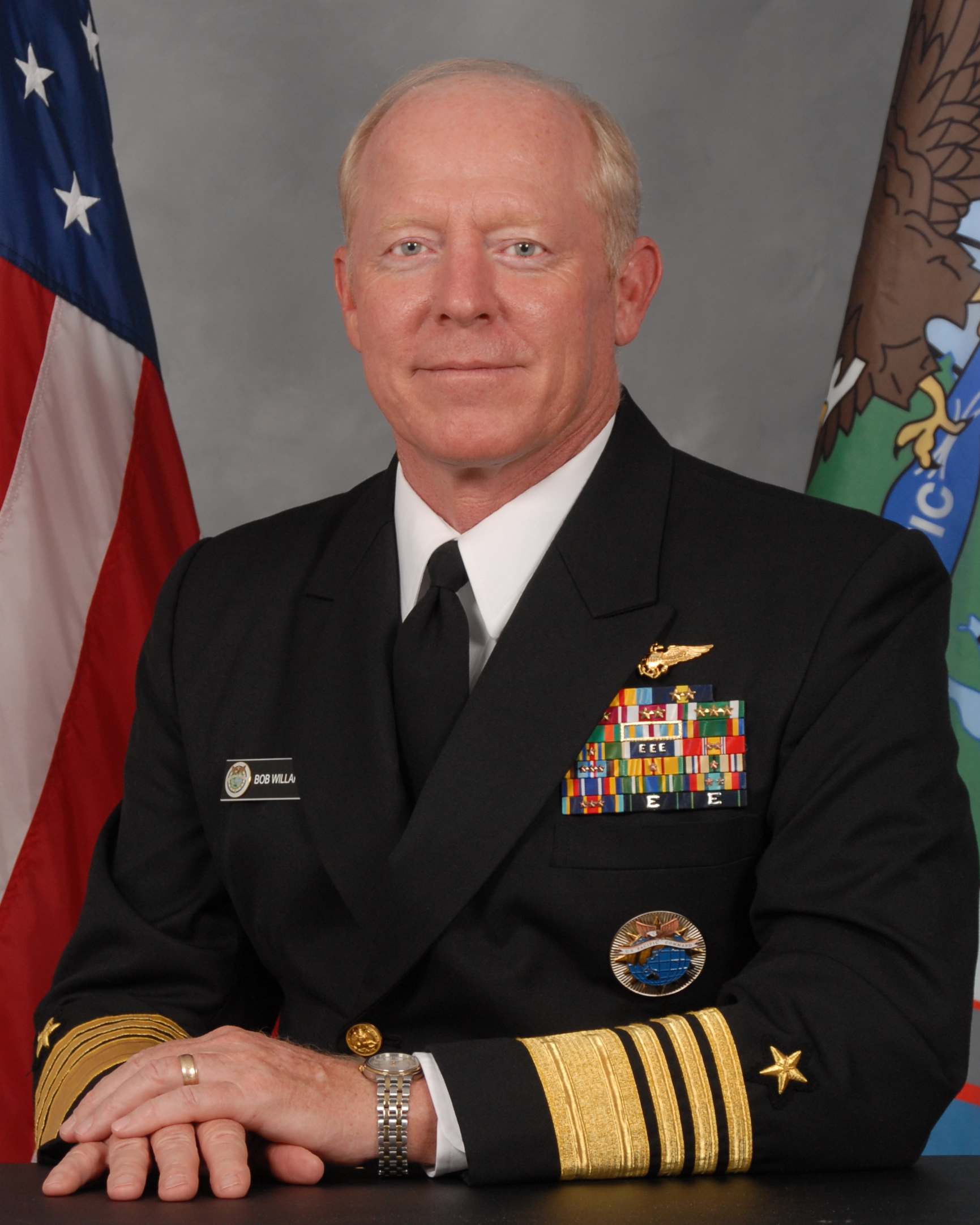
- Born: December 5, 1950 (age 75); Bell, California, U.S.
- Military career
- Branch: United States Navy
- Service years: 1973–2012
- Rank: Admiral
- Commands: U.S. Pacific Command; U.S. Pacific Fleet; U.S. Seventh Fleet; Carrier Strike Group 5 USS Abraham Lincoln (CVN-72); USS Tripoli (LPH-10); VF-51 Screaming Eagles
- Awards: Defense Distinguished Service Medal; Navy Distinguished Service Medal (3); Legion of Merit (4); Meritorious Service Medal (3); Navy Commendation Medal (4)

Robert Frederick Willard (born 5 December 1950) is a retired United States Navy admiral who last served as the 22nd commander, U.S. Pacific Command from October 19, 2009 to March 9, 2012. He previously served as Commander, U.S. Pacific Fleet from May 8, 2007, to September 25, 2009. Prior to that, he served as the 34th Vice Chief of Naval Operations from March 18, 2005, to April 2007. On March 9, 2012, Admiral Willard retired from the Navy after 39 years of service. On May 9, 2012, he was elected president and chief executive officer of the Institute of Nuclear Power Operations, succeeding retired Navy admiral James O. Ellis Jr.

== Navy career ==
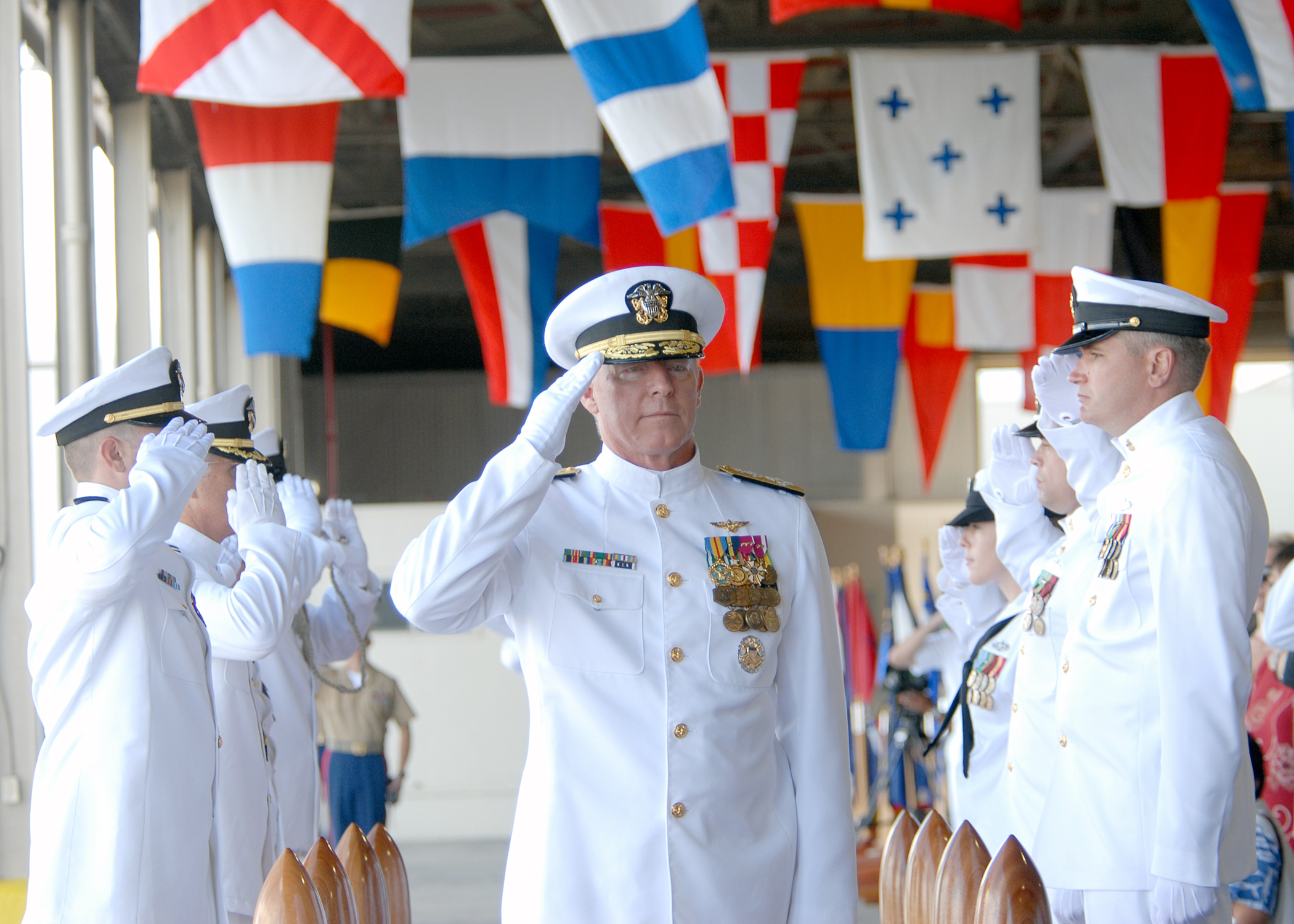
Willard renders a salute as he passes through the sideboys at the U.S. Pacific Fleet change of command ceremony, September 25, 2009.

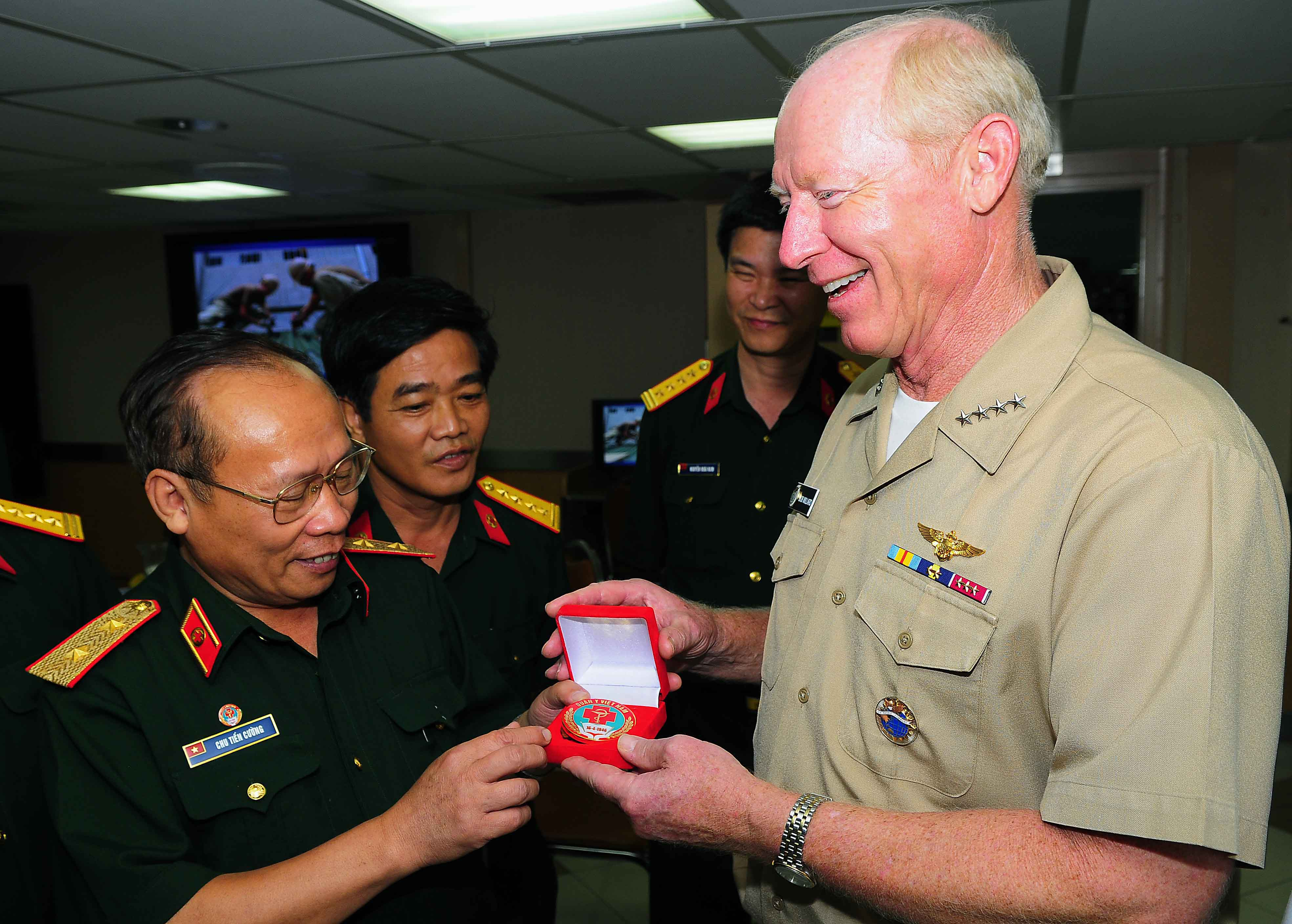
Willard receives a command coin from Lieutenant General Chu Tien Cuong during a visit to USNS Mercy (T-AH 19).

Willard is a Los Angeles native. In 1969, he graduated from East Longmeadow High School in East Longmeadow, Massachusetts, and received a Bachelor of Science degree from the United States Naval Academy in 1973. He also holds a Master of Science degree in engineering management from Old Dominion University and was a fellow at MIT Seminar XXI.

An F-14 naval aviator, Willard served consecutively in Fighter Squadron 24 (VF-24), Fighter Squadron 124 (VF-124), and Fighter Squadron 2 (VF-2) at NAS Miramar, deploying aboard USS Constellation (CV-64), USS Ranger (CV-61), and USS Kitty Hawk (CV-63). He then joined Navy Fighter Weapons School Top Gun as operations officer and executive officer, as well as aerial coordinator for the Paramount film Top Gun.

In 1987, Willard reported to Fighter Squadron 51 (VF-51), where he served as executive officer and commanding officer of the Screaming Eagles, embarked in USS Carl Vinson (CVN-70). He subsequently attended Navy Nuclear Power Training before rejoining Carl Vinson as executive officer. Willard then commanded the flagships USS Tripoli (LPH-10) and USS Abraham Lincoln (CVN-72) in various operations, including Somalia, and the Persian Gulf.

As a flag officer, Willard has served on the Joint Staff as deputy director for operations (current readiness and capabilities); commander. In 1998–1999, he attended MIT Seminar XXI. He also served on Carrier Group Five embarked in USS Kitty Hawk (CV-63); deputy and chief of staff, commander in chief, U.S. Pacific Fleet in Pearl Harbor, Hawaii; commander, Seventh Fleet, embarked in USS Blue Ridge (LCC-19) in Yokosuka, Japan; and director for force structure, resources and assessment (DJ8) on the Joint Chiefs of Staff. From March 2005 to April 2007, Willard was the 34th Vice Chief of Naval Operations. After, he was the commander of U.S. Pacific Fleet from May 8, 2007, until September 25, 2009, when he was relieved by Admiral Patrick M. Walsh. As the commander, U.S. Pacific Fleet, he was responsible for the world's largest fleet command, encompassing 100,000,000 square miles (260,000,000 km^{2}) and more than 170 ships and submarines, 1,300 aircraft, and 122,000 sailors, reservists and civilians.

He was named a Distinguished Graduate of the U.S. Naval Academy in late 2018.

== Popular culture ==
Willard appeared in and was a consultant for the 1986 film Top Gun. He pilots the “MiG-28” that receives "the bird" from Goose and Maverick.

In March 2010, a video in which Rep. Hank Johnson expressed his concern to Willard that the island of Guam might "capsize" and "tip over" due to overpopulation of military equipment and personnel went viral, garnering hundreds of thousands of views from thehill.com, hotair.com and latimes.com and was ultimately seen over three million times. Willard reassured the Congressman, "we don't anticipate that", for which he received wide popular admiration.

== Awards and decorations ==
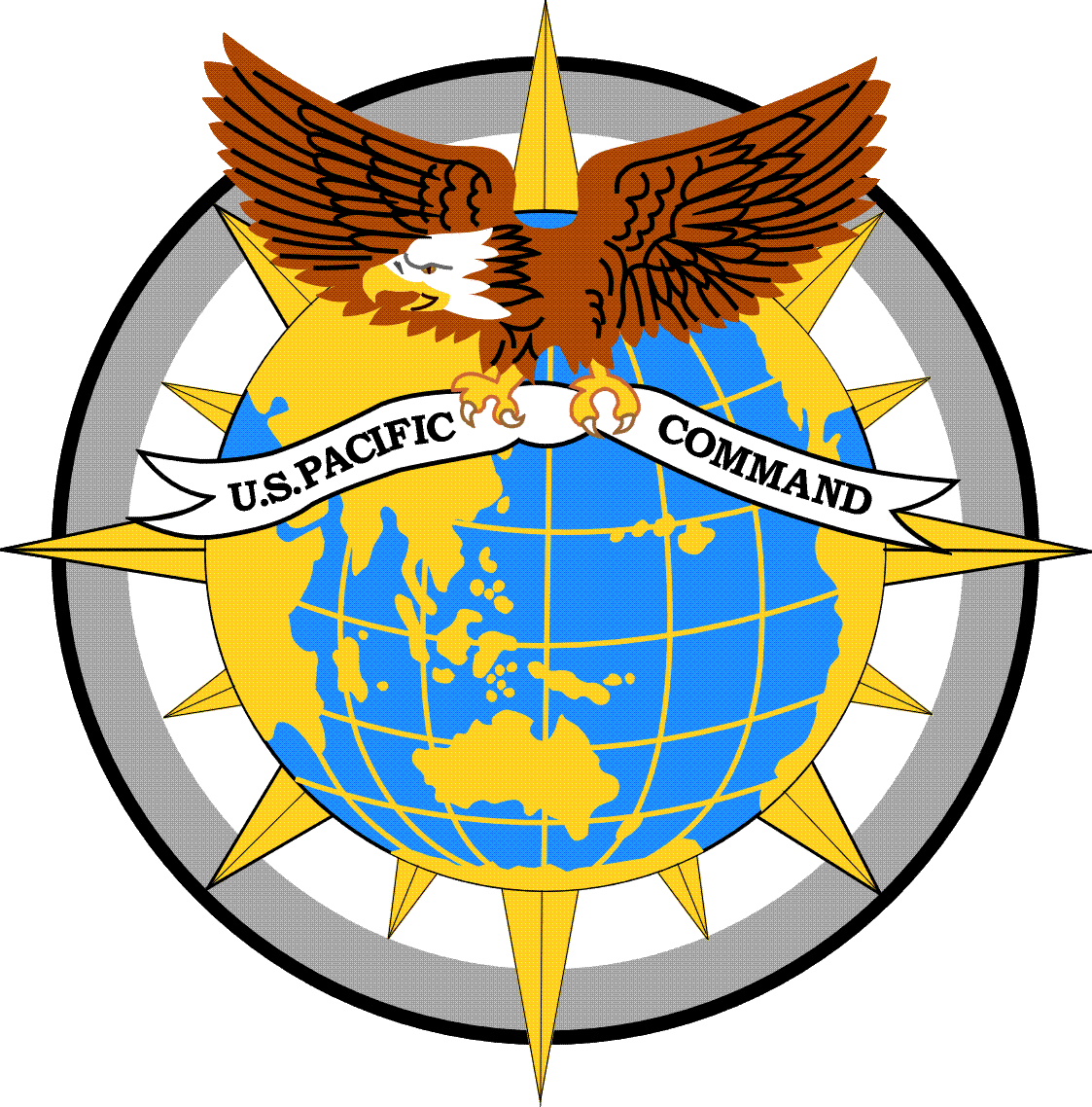

Defense Distinguished Service Medal
Navy Distinguished Service Medal with 2 golden award stars
Legion of Merit with 3 award stars
Meritorious Service Medal with 2 award stars
Navy Commendation Medal with 3 award stars
Navy Achievement Medal
Joint Meritorious Unit Award
Navy Unit Commendation
Navy Meritorious Unit Commendation with 1 bronze service star
Navy "E" Ribbon w/ 3 Battle E devices
National Defense Service Medal with 2 bronze service stars
Armed Forces Expeditionary Medal with 3 bronze service stars
Vietnam Service Medal with 1 bronze service star
Southwest Asia Service Medal with 1 bronze service star
Global War on Terrorism Service Medal
Korea Defense Service Medal
Navy Sea Service Deployment Ribbon with 1 silver and 1 bronze service star
Navy & Marine Corps Overseas Service Ribbon with 3 bronze service stars
Grand Cordon of the Order of the Rising Sun (Japan, 1st class, Kyokujitsu-Daijusho (旭日大綬章))
Honorary Officer of the Order of Australia (Military Division)
Navy Expert Rifleman Medal
Navy Expert Pistol Shot Medal

Military offices
Preceded by Timothy J. Keating	Commander of the United States Pacific Command; October 19, 2009 - March 9, 2012	Succeeded by Samuel J. Locklear
Preceded by John B. Nathman	Vice Chief of Naval Operations; 2005 – 2007	Succeeded by Patrick M. Walsh
