= Peter Andreas =

American political scientist

- Born: 1965 (age 60–61)

Academic background
- Education: Swarthmore College; Cornell University

Academic work
- Institutions: Brown University

Peter Andreas (born 1965) is an American political scientist. Since 2014, he has been the John Hay Professor of International Studies at Brown University's Watson Institute for International and Public Affairs. Common themes of across his work include war, borders, and shadow economies in Europe and the Americas.

== Childhood ==
Peter Andreas was born in 1965 in Detroit, Michigan. His mother Carol grew up in a Mennonite community and became radicalized as a young adult, embracing radical feminism and Marxism. Carol's radical politics were incompatible with those of Andreas' father, Carl, leading her to file for divorce in 1969. Without Carl's consent, Carol fled to Berkeley, California and established a commune. In the 1970s, Andreas followed his mother in her travels around South America, living in Ecuador, Chile, and Peru. The family fled Chile in 1973 following the coup d'état that deposed President Salvador Allende's socialist government.

After returning to the United States, Carol lost custody of Peter; in response, she kidnapped her son and fled to Peru with a new husband. Andreas and his mother ultimately returned to the United States, settling in Denver. Andreas attended East High School; he enrolled at Tufts University though ultimately transferred to Swarthmore College, where he earned a Bachelor of Arts in political science. Andreas received an M.A. and Ph.D. in government from Cornell University.

== Scholarship ==
Prior to joining Brown in 2006, Andreas was a Harvard Academy Scholar at Harvard University and Brookings Research Fellow at the Brookings Institution.

=== Books ===
- Drug War Politics: The Price of Denial, University of California Press (published 1996), 15 July 1996, ISBN 9780520918047, with Eva Bertram, Morris Blachman, and Kenneth Sharpe
- Border Games: Policing the U.S.–Mexico Divide, Cornell University Press, 2000, ISBN 0801487560
- Policing the Globe: Criminalization and Crime Control in International Relations, Oxford University Press (published 2006), 31 August 2006, ISBN 0195089480, with Ethan Nadelmann
- Blue Helmets and Black Markets: The Business of Survival in the Siege of Sarajevo, Cornell University Press, 2008, ISBN 978-0801443558
- Smuggler Nation: How Illicit Trade Made America, Oxford University Press (published 2014), June 2014, ISBN 9780199360987
- Rebel Mother: My Childhood Chasing the Revolution, Simon & Schuster (published 2017), 4 April 2017, ISBN 978-1501124457
- Killer High: A History of War in Six Drugs, Oxford University Press, 2020, ISBN 9780190463014
