= John J. Donnelly =

American submarine officer (born 1952)

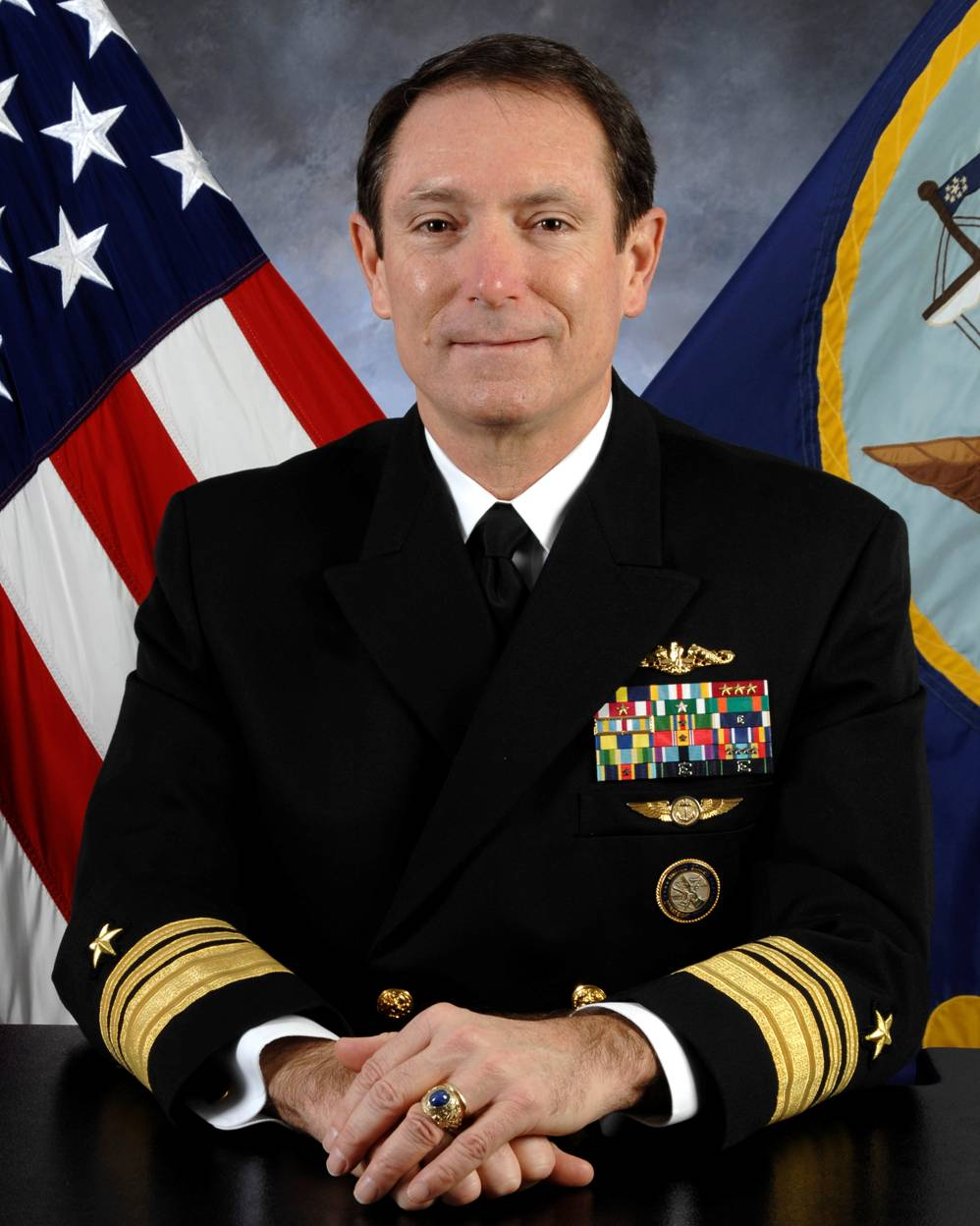
- Born: December 23, 1952 (age 73); Groton, Connecticut, United States
- Military career
- Service years: 1975–2010
- Rank: Vice Admiral
- Awards: Defense Superior Service Medal; Legion of Merit; Meritorious Service Medal; Commendation Medal; Achievement Medal

Vice Admiral John Jay Donnelly (born December 23, 1952) is a retired American submarine officer. A graduate from the U.S. Naval Academy class of 1975, he retired in 2010 after 35 years of service.

== Early life and education ==
A native of Groton, Connecticut and a second-generation submarine officer, he was a physics major and distinguished graduate from the U.S. Naval Academy class of 1975. He received a Master of Science degree in Engineering Acoustics from the Naval Postgraduate School and attended MIT Seminar XXI on Foreign Politics, International Relations, and National Interest.

== Career as Navy officer ==
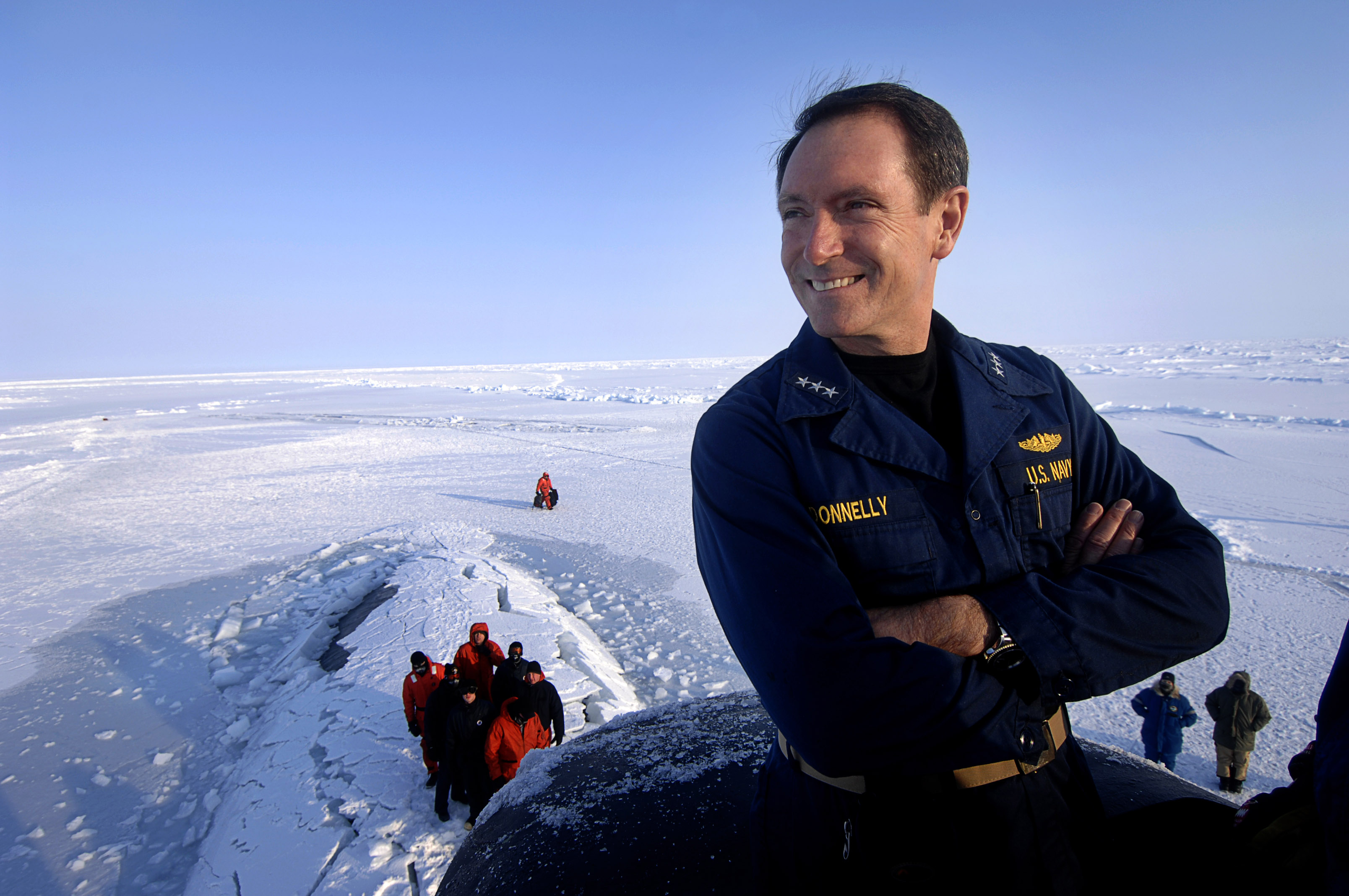
Donnelly in 2007

As a career submarine officer, he served as division officer on USS Tautog (SSN 639), engineer officer on USS Memphis (SSN 691), and executive officer on USS Simon Bolivar (SSBN 641). His afloat command assignments were aboard USS Hyman G. Rickover (SSN 709) and USS McKee (AS 41).

His early shore assignments include duty as a physics instructor at the U.S. Naval Academy; assistant for Undersea Warfare and Strategic Issues for the chief of naval operations executive panel staff (OP-00K); head of the Submarine Acquisition Branch (N872C) and assistant for Plans and Liaison (N87C) for the deputy chief of naval operations for Submarine Warfare Requirements.

Following major command, he served as chief of staff for commander, 7th Fleet where he was selected for flag rank. Subsequently, he served as director of Combat Plans (J5A) and deputy director for Operations and Logistics (J3/4A) at U.S. Strategic Command; as commander, Submarine Group 7; and as deputy commander and chief of staff, U.S. Pacific Fleet.

== Decorations ==
His awards and decorations include the Navy Distinguished Service Medal, Defense Superior Service Medal, Legion of Merit (four awards), Meritorious Service Medal (two awards), Navy and Marine Corps Commendation Medal (six awards), Navy and Marine Corps Achievement Medal, and various unit and campaign awards.
