= Carrier strike group =

US Navy unit with aircraft carrier

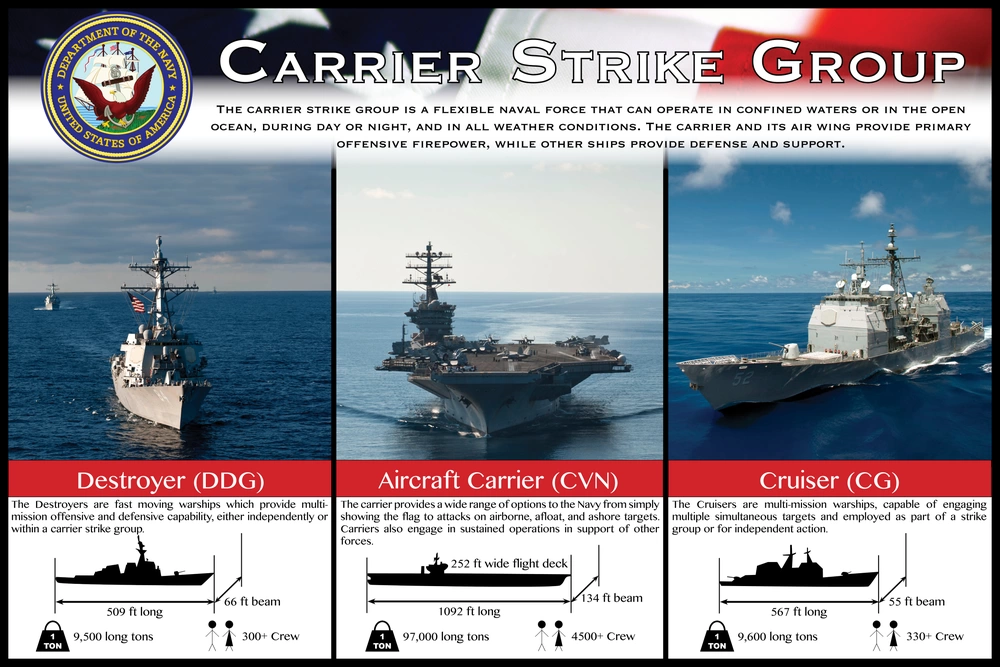
Components of a U.S. Navy Carrier Strike Group

A carrier strike group (CSG) is a type of carrier battle group of the United States Navy. It is an operational formation composed of roughly 7,500 personnel, usually an aircraft carrier, at least one cruiser, a destroyer squadron of at least two destroyers or frigates, and a carrier air wing of 65 to 70 aircraft. A carrier strike group, on occasion, also includes submarines, attached logistics ships and a supply ship. The carrier strike group commander operationally reports to the commander of the numbered fleet, who is operationally responsible for the area of waters in which the carrier strike group is operating.

Strike groups comprise a principal element of U.S. power projection capability; a single supercarrier holds enough firepower to rival the air forces of entire nations. Previously referred to as "carrier battle groups" (a term still used by other nations), they are often referred to by the carrier they are associated with (e.g., Enterprise Strike Group). As of March 2023 there are 11 carrier strike groups in the U.S. Navy.

A carrier strike group is a flexible naval force that can operate in confined waters or in the open ocean, during day and night, in all weather conditions. The principal role of the carrier and its air wing within the carrier strike group is to provide the primary offensive firepower, while the other ships provide defense and support. These roles are not exclusive though, and other ships in the strike group sometimes undertake offensive operations (launching cruise missiles, for instance) and the carrier's air wing contributes to the strike group's defense (through combat air patrols and airborne anti-submarine efforts). Thus, from a command and control perspective, carrier strike groups are combat organized by mission rather than by platform.

== History ==
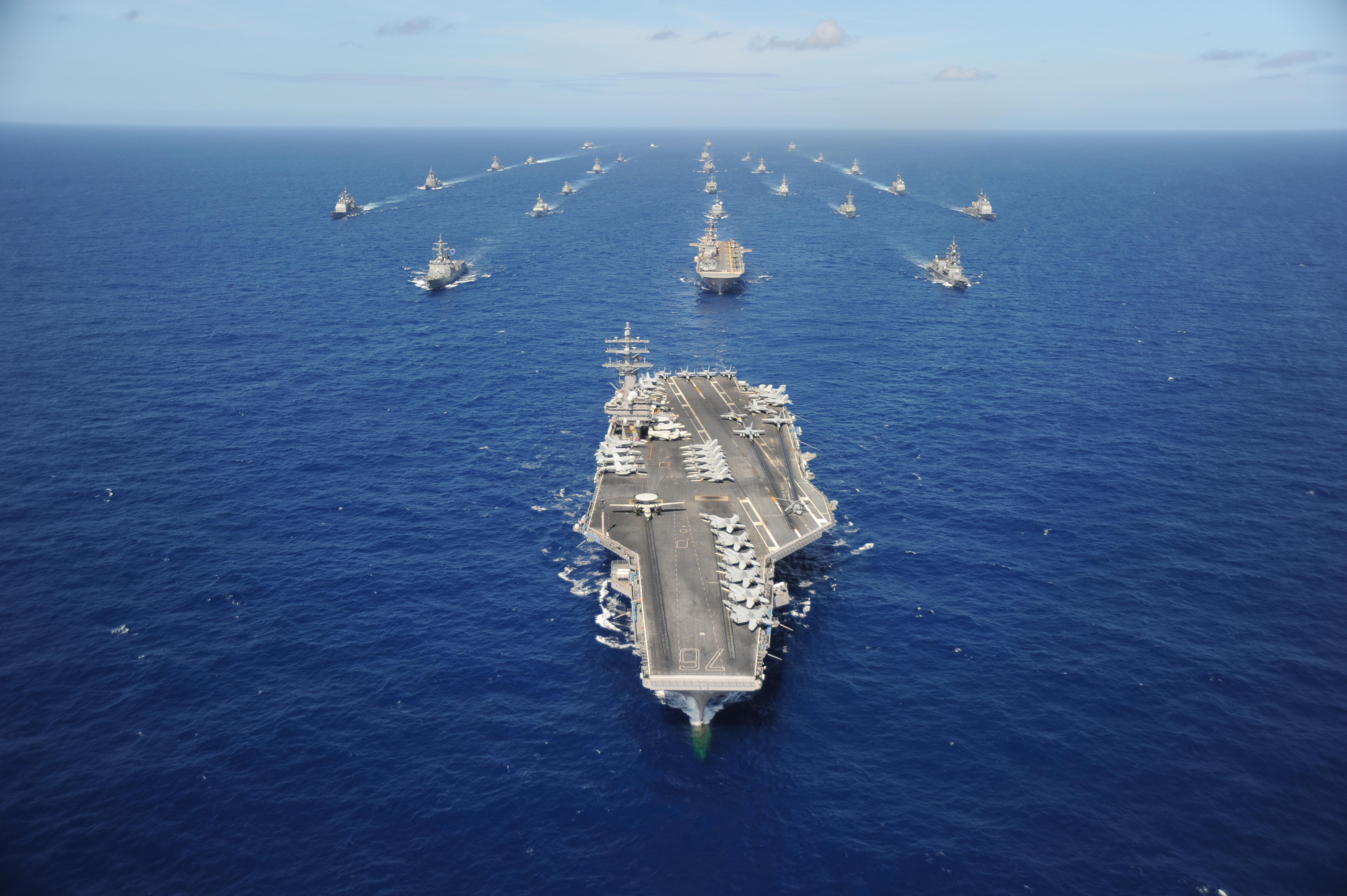
Carrier at RIMPAC 2010

The development of the U.S. Navy carrier battle group can be traced to the 1920s and was initially based on previous experience grouping battleships and other major surface combatants. In World War II, administratively, aircraft carriers were assigned to carrier divisions (CARDIVs). Operationally they were assigned to Task Forces, of which Task Force 11, Task Force 16 and Task Force 17 perhaps gained the most fame for their roles in the Battle of the Coral Sea and the Battle of Midway. The single-carrier battle group was born with the military drawdown that followed World War II. Carrier Division 1 was redesignated Carrier Group 1 on 30 June 1973, and seemingly all Carrier Divisions were redesignated Carrier Groups on that date.

Throughout the 1990s, the U.S. Navy's aircraft carrier groups were officially referred to as Carrier Battle Groups (CVBGs), and were commanded by either flag officers called Cruiser-Destroyer Group (CRUDESGRU) or Carrier Group (CARGRU) commanders.

In the summer of 1992, the U.S. Navy instituted a concept that mandated greater task group integration of naval air and surface warfare assets into a more permanent carrier battle group structure. Each of the Navy's 12 existing carrier battle groups consisted of an aircraft carrier; an embarked carrier air wing; cruisers, destroyer, and frigate units; and two nuclear-powered attack submarines.

On 1 October 2004, carrier groups and cruiser-destroyer groups were redesignated carrier strike groups. The change in nomenclature from 'Battle' to 'Strike' appears to have been in connection with an increasing emphasis on projecting air power ashore; the change acknowledged cognizance that post war scenario of fleet action battles like the one at Battle of Midway were becoming increasingly unlikely.

== Missions ==
Carrier strike groups are tasked to accomplish a variety of wartime missions, as well as a wide variety of functions in situations short of war. The peacetime mission is to conduct forward presence operations, to help shape the strategic environment, deter conflict, build interoperability with allies, and respond to crises when necessary. The U.S. Navy provides a regular rotation of strike groups overseas, typically for six-eight months, based on the needs of Unified Combatant Commands that request strike group capabilities in their respective area of responsibility (AOR). The ships in the group often "disaggregate" from the carrier, performing missions hundreds or even thousands of miles away. The missions of the carrier strike groups include:

- Power projection ashore against a wide range of strategic, operational, and tactical targets defended by sophisticated air defense systems, during day and night, in all weather conditions.
- Gaining and maintaining sea control including coastal regions, bounded seas, choke points, and the open ocean.
- Protection of commercial and military shipping.
- Protection of a United States Marine Corps Amphibious Ready Group prior to or during an amphibious operation.
- Humanitarian Assistance/Disaster Relief (HA/DR).
- Surveillance/Intelligence to achieve and maintain a comprehensive operational picture of the littoral environment, including surface, undersea, air, and relevant land areas of interest.
- Command and Control of assigned U.S. and multinational forces.
- Establishing air superiority or air supremacy in an area by seizing and maintaining control of designated airspace.
- Theater ballistic missile defense (TBMD) of littoral areas and selected theater-wide areas against attack.
- Operations in support of the peacetime presence mission, including supporting U.S. diplomacy through cooperative engagement with designated allied forces, normal peacetime operations, and shows of force.

== Typical CSG composition ==
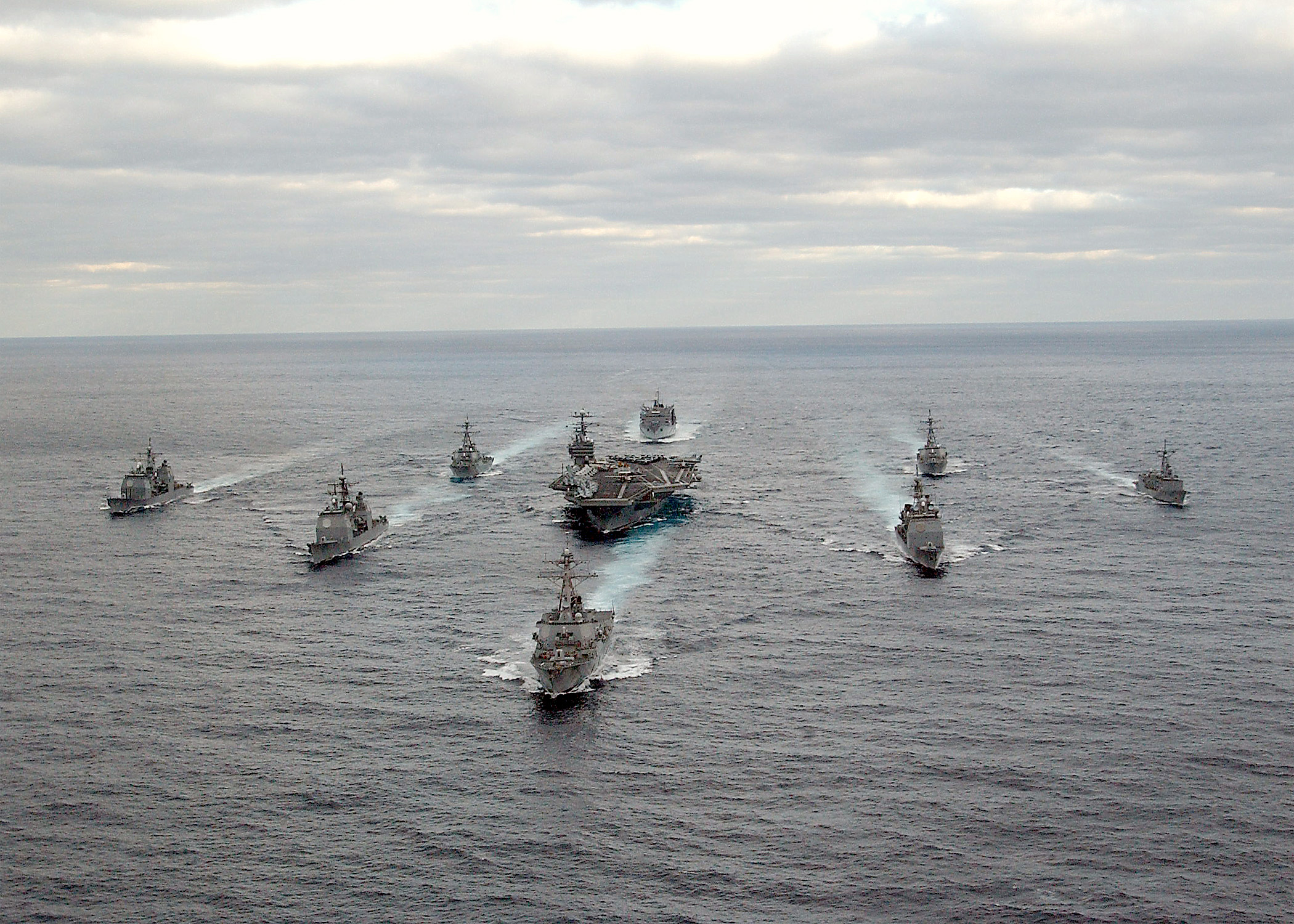
U.S. Navy ships assigned to the USS George Washington Carrier Strike Group sail in formation in the Atlantic Ocean in November 2003.

CSGs are not restricted to a specific composition and can be modified depending on expected threats, roles, or missions during a deployment, and one may be different from another. The Navy states that "there really is no real definition of a strike group. Strike groups are formed and disestablished on an as-needed basis, and one may be different from another. However, they all are comprised of similar types of ships." A U.S. Navy carrier strike group typically includes:

- A supercarrier, which is the centerpiece of the strike group and also serves as the flagship for the CSG Commander and respective staff. The carrier is commanded by an aviation community captain.
- A carrier air wing (CVW) typically consisting of up to nine squadrons. Carrier air wings are commanded by an aviation community captain (or occasionally a Marine colonel).
- One or two Aegis guided missile cruisers (CG) of the Ticonderoga class—a multi-mission surface combatant, equipped with BGM-109 Tomahawk missiles for long-range strike capability, each commanded by a surface community captain.
- A destroyer squadron (DESRON) commanded by a surface community captain (O-6) who commands the escort destroyers, with two to three guided missile destroyers (DDG), of the Arleigh Burke class—a multi-mission surface combatant, used primarily for anti-aircraft (AAW) and anti-submarine (ASW) warfare, but which also carries Tomahawk missiles for long-range strike capability. A destroyer is commanded by a surface community commander.
- Up to two attack submarines, used to screen the strike group against hostile surface ships and submarines, but which also carry Tomahawk missiles for long-range strike capability. These would be commanded by a submarine community commander (O-5).
- A combined ammunition, oiler and supply ship (AOE/AOR), usually Supply-class (T-AOE); provides logistic support.

While the carrier strike group is the various components' operational superior, administratively the ships and the carrier air wing are assigned to different U.S. Navy type commands (TYCOMs). Aircraft carriers and carrier air wings are under the administrative control of Commander, Naval Air Force U.S. Atlantic Fleet, or Commander, Naval Air Forces, Pacific. Escorts, including guided-missile cruisers and a CSG's destroyer squadron are under the administrative control of Commander, Naval Surface Force Atlantic or Commander, Naval Surface Forces Pacific.

== Composite Warfare Command structure ==
The Strike Group comprises several commands, all of which reside under the authority of the Commander of the CSG (CCSG or COMCARSTRKGRU). The CCSG is typically a rear admiral (lower half), who often promotes to rear admiral (upper half) while in the job. The CCSG is the Immediate Superior in Command (ISIC) to the carrier, air wing, destroyer squadron, and cruiser commanding officers assigned to the strike group. As such, the CCSG is responsible for unit-level training, integrated training, and readiness for assigned ships and units, as well as maintaining administrative functions and material readiness tracking for ships and squadrons assigned to the group.

In battle, the CCSG is also known as the Composite Warfare Commander (CWC), who acts as the central command authority for the entire strike group. The CWC designates subordinate warfare commanders for various missions:

- Strike Warfare Commander (STWC): The STWC is usually the air wing commander. The STWC sets the general strike philosophy and employs air wing aircraft as well as strike group Tomahawk missiles.
- Air Warfare Commander (AWC): The commanding officer of one of the strike group cruisers is usually assigned as AWC. The AWC is the only warfare commander not on the carrier, as the Combat Information Center (CIC) of AEGIS cruisers is specially designed for inner air battle functions.
- Command & Control, Space and Electronic Warfare Commander (C2W): The C2W acts as principal advisor to CWC for use and counter-use of the electromagnetic spectrum by friendly and enemy forces. The C2W promulgates force Emissions Control (EMCON) restrictions, monitors organic and non-organic intelligence and surveillance sensors and develops operational deception and counter-targeting plans as appropriate.
- Surface Warfare Commander (SUWC). The SUWC is responsible for surface surveillance coordination and war-at-sea.
- Undersea Warfare Commander (USWC).

SUWC and USWC responsibilities are often combined into Sea Combat Commander (SCC), usually delegated to the DESRON commander. The SCC performs these duties from aboard the carrier due to its superior command and control capabilities.

In addition, supporting the CWC and the subordinate warfare commanders are coordinators who manage force sensors and assets within the strike group.

== List of Carrier Strike Groups ==
The United States Navy maintains 11 carrier strike groups, 10 of which are based in the United States and one that is forward deployed to Japan. They were all redesignations of former Carrier Groups (CarGrus) and Cruiser-Destroyer Groups (CCDGs). The Fleet Response Plan requires that six CSGs be deployed or ready for deployment within 30 days at any given time, while two additional groups must be ready for deployment within 90 days. The Navy typically maintains at least one CSG in the U.S. Fifth Fleet in Southwest Asia on rotation basis and one on permanent basis in the U.S. Seventh Fleet in the Western Pacific at all times. CSGs operate in the U.S. Sixth Fleet in the Mediterranean, and U.S. Fourth Fleet around the South American continent as they transit to and from other areas. CSG Commanders report to their respective numbered-fleet commander, depending on where they are operating. When not deployed overseas west coast CSGs report to U.S. Third Fleet.

=== Refueling and Complex Overhaul ===
USS Theodore Roosevelt did not have an embarked CSG while the carrier was going through its four-year-long Refueling and Complex Overhaul (RCOH) which was expected to be completed by August 2013. Theodore Roosevelt was assigned to Carrier Strike Group Twelve subsequent to deactivation of USS Enterprise on 1 December 2012.

USS Abraham Lincoln was shifted to Newport News, Virginia, for its Refueling and Complex Overhaul, in August 2012 which was delayed until March 2013.

On 14 January 2014, the U.S. Navy announced that USS Ronald Reagan would replace USS George Washington as the flagship of Carrier Strike Group Five, the only forward-based carrier strike group home-ported at Yokosuka, Japan, as part of the U.S. Seventh Fleet. George Washington was scheduled to shift to Newport News for its mid-life Refueling and Complex Overhaul.

=== Permanent change-of-station status ===
On 14 January 2014, the U.S. Navy announced that USS Theodore Roosevelt would shift its home-port to Naval Base San Diego, California, becoming part of the U.S. Third Fleet. As such, Theodore Roosevelt and its assigned carrier strike group would also deploy to the U.S. Seventh Fleet's operating area in the western Pacific.

=== List of active CSGs ===
As of January 2012 the U.S. Navy was committed to maintaining 11 carriers, but only had 10 active until USS Gerald R. Ford went into service in 2017. On August 4, 2017, George Washington entered dry dock in Newport News, Virginia, for a four-year Refueling and Complex Overhaul (RCOH).

On August 1, 2011, the Navy announced that Carrier Strike Group Nine would change its permanent duty station from Naval Station Everett to Naval Base San Diego effective December 14, 2012.

Carrier strike group	Last assigned aircraft carrier	Carrier air wing	Destroyer squadron	Home port	Ref.
Carrier Strike Group One (formerly CarGru 1)	USS Carl Vinson (CVN-70)	Carrier Air Wing Two	DESRON-1	Naval Base San Diego, California	
Carrier Strike Group Two (formerly CarGru 2)	USS Dwight D. Eisenhower (CVN-69)	Carrier Air Wing Three	DESRON-22	Naval Station Norfolk, Virginia	
Carrier Strike Group Three (formerly CarGru 3)	USS Abraham Lincoln (CVN-72)	Carrier Air Wing Nine	DESRON-21	Naval Base San Diego, California	
Carrier Strike Group Five (formerly CarGru 5)	USS George Washington (CVN-73)	Carrier Air Wing Five	DESRON-15	Fleet Activities Yokosuka, Japan	
Carrier Strike Group Eight (formerly CarGru 8)	USS Harry S. Truman (CVN-75)	Carrier Air Wing One	DESRON-28	Naval Station Norfolk, Virginia	
Carrier Strike Group Nine (formerly CCDG 3)	USS Theodore Roosevelt (CVN-71)	Carrier Air Wing Eleven	DESRON-9	Naval Base San Diego, California	
Carrier Strike Group Ten (formerly CCDG 2)	USS George H. W. Bush (CVN-77)	Carrier Air Wing Seven	DESRON-26	Naval Station Norfolk, Virginia	
Carrier Strike Group Eleven (formerly CCDG 5)	USS Nimitz (CVN-68)	Carrier Air Wing Seventeen	DESRON-23	Naval Station Everett, Washington	
Carrier Strike Group Twelve (formerly CCDG 8)	USS Gerald R. Ford (CVN-78)	Carrier Air Wing Eight	DESRON-2	Naval Station Norfolk, Virginia	

=== List of former CSGs ===
Carrier Strike Group Four was redesignated alongside the other groups in 2004, but has since been redesignated Commander Strike Force Training Atlantic. In 2014, CSFTLANT was again redesignated as Carrier Strike Group 4, retaining its role as the training and certification command for all US Fleet Forces assigned warships.

Carrier Strike Group Six was established from Carrier Group Six with USS John F. Kennedy at Naval Station Mayport in 2004, but seems to have since been disestablished.

Carrier Strike Group Fifteen has been disestablished, and its flagship, the carrier Ronald Reagan, was reassigned to Carrier Strike Group Seven. Commander, Strike Force Training Pacific was subsequently redesignated as Carrier Strike Group Fifteen in 2014.

The deactivation of Carrier Strike Group Seven effective 30 December 2011 reflects the U.S. Navy's future budgetary reductions and the reduced availability of its operational carrier fleet and carrier air wings.

Carrier Strike Group	Last Assigned Aircraft Carrier	Carrier air wing	Destroyer Squadron	Homeport	Notes
Carrier Strike Group Four				Became Commander Strike Force Training Atlantic between July 2005 and February 2006	
Carrier Strike Group Six (formerly CarGru 6)	USS John F. Kennedy (CV-67)	CVW-17		Naval Station Mayport	
Carrier Strike Group Seven (formerly CarGru 7)	USS Ronald Reagan (CVN-76)	Carrier Air Wing Fourteen	DESRON-7	Naval Air Station North Island	
Carrier Strike Group Fourteen (formerly CCDG 12)	—	—	—	Naval Station Mayport	
Carrier Strike Group Fifteen (formerly CCDG 1)	USS Ronald Reagan (CVN-76)	—	—	Disestablished 21 March 2005 – Pacific coast	

== See also ==
- Exercise Summer Pulse
- Expeditionary strike group
- Modern United States Navy carrier air operations
