= Destroyer squadron =

Naval unit consisting of destroyers

A destroyer squadron is a naval squadron or flotilla usually consisting of destroyers rather than other types of vessel. In some navies other vessels, such as frigates, may be included. In English the word "squadron" tends to be used for larger and "flotilla" for smaller vessels; both may be used for destroyer units. Similar formations are used in non-English-speaking countries, e.g., the "escadrille"—which would translate directly as "squadron"—in France.

== Royal Navy ==
The Royal Navy began to form units of destroyers after the introduction of 'torpedo boat destroyers' in the early 1900s, though pre-World War Two they were usually designated flotillas. RN destroyer units are listed in the main article above examples of some destroyer squadrons below.

- 1st Destroyer Squadron, 1947-1970
- 2nd Destroyer Squadron, 1956-1971
- 3rd Destroyer Squadron, 1945-2001
- 4th Destroyer Squadron, 1948-1959
- 5th Destroyer Squadron, 1947-2002

== US Navy ==
The U.S. Navy acronym for a destroyer squadron is DESRON; it comprises three or more destroyers or frigates. It is not generally responsible for training, equipping and administering of its ships. Rather, it provides tactical and operational control for assigned units for the purpose of combat employment. A mixed unit including destroyers is the cruiser-destroyer group. The officer in command of DESRON SIX, for example, is designated Commander Destroyer Squadron Six, COMDESRON SIX for short.

As during World War II, a full-strength DesRon (as it was abbreviated at the time) comprised two Destroyer Divisions or DesDivs of four ships each, plus a squadron flagship; these were operational as well as administrative units.

In the late 1950s and through early 1962 a Squadron (Desron) comprised two four-ship Divisions (Desdivs) with one ship designated the flagship. The flagship carried the Squadron Commodore as well as the ship's Captain. The Squadron normally operated as a unit within a Task Group or Fleet, its main duty being as anti-submarine screen for the aircraft carriers. Often, however, the divisions of the squadron were assigned to separate duties—and sometimes two ship elements might be sent on individual assignments. The flagship not only carried the Commodore, it also carried the Squadron doctor and chaplain.

From 1 April 1962, Cruiser-Destroyer forces in the Atlantic and Pacific Fleets were organized in Cruiser-Destroyer Flotillas (CRUDESFLOTs). These formations included Cruiser-Destroyer Flotilla One in the Pacific (included Parks), Cruiser-Destroyer Flotilla Three at Long Beach in the Pacific (commanded for a time by Rear Admiral Draper Kauffman), Cruiser-Destroyer Flotilla Two in the Atlantic (included Yosemite), Cruiser-Destroyer Flotilla Four in the Atlantic, which supplied ships for the Task Force Alfa antisubmarine experiment and had USS Shenandoah as flagship for a time. Cornelius S. Snodgrass served as chief of staff for CRUDESFLOT 4 before his retirement in 1974. Cruiser-Destroyer Flotilla Six in the Atlantic (flagship at one point USS Macdonough and included Yellowstone). Cruiser-Destroyer Flotilla Six included Destroyer Squadron Four with USS Johnson in 1971, seemingly home-ported at the Charleston Naval Base. Cruiser-Destroyer Flotilla Seven was homeported at San Diego, commanded by Admiral Waldemar F. A. Wendt from April 1962, with concurrent duty as Commander, Cruiser-Destroyer Force, Pacific, October–November 1961. CRUDESFLOT SEVEN was also commanded at one point by then Rear Admiral Elmo Zumwalt. In December 1969, Admiral Robert S. Salzer assumed command of Cruiser Destroyer Flotilla 3. Salzar assumed command of Cruiser Destroyer Flotilla 7 in September 1970, and after the disestablishment of that formation on 16 March 1971 returned to command of Cruiser Destroyer Flotilla 3.

Other flotillas included Cruiser-Destroyer Flotilla Eight in the Atlantic, which at one point included Destroyer Squadron Twenty-Two, Cruiser-Destroyer Flotilla Nine in the Pacific, Cruiser-Destroyer Flotilla Eleven in the Pacific (with DesDiv 152, DesRon 15?), and Cruiser-Destroyer Flotillas Ten and Twelve in the Atlantic.

On 30 June 1973 Cruiser-Destroyer Flotillas were redesignated Cruiser-Destroyer Groups (CRUDESGRUs). The overall responsibility for surface warships on the west coast of the US is taken by the Commander, Naval Surface Forces Pacific (COMNAVSURFPAC); on the east coast, the same responsibility rests with the Commander, Naval Surface Force Atlantic (COMSURFLANT). Previously under this system, when deployed, a Cruiser-Destroyer Group Commander would normally have been assigned to command a Carrier Battle Group (CVBG). Cruiser-Destroyer Groups were superseded by Carrier strike groups from 1 October 2004.

When a destroyer squadron deploys, for instance as part of a carrier strike group, overall command is transferred to the Naval Component Commander of the local Regional Command (e.g. COMNAVCENT or Commander US Naval Forces, Central Command).

=== List of US destroyer squadrons ===
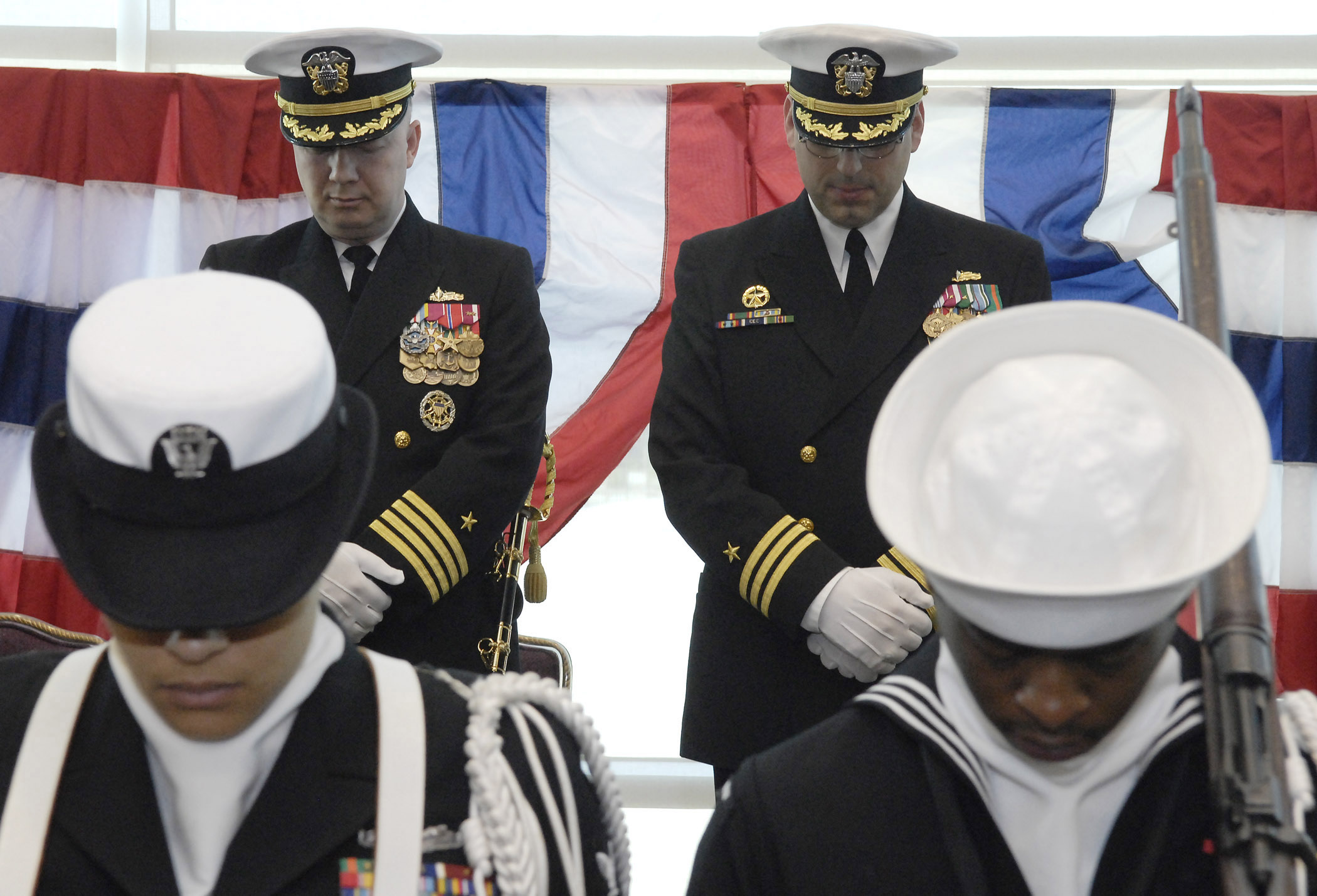
Capt. Jeffrey Harley, Commander Destroyer Squadron Nine (DESRON 9), left, and Cmdr. Jonathan Christian, Commodore Afloat Training Group Pacific Northwest, right, bow their heads during the invocation at the beginning of the change of command ceremony held for Afloat Training Group Pacific Northwest in the Grand Vista Ballroom at Naval Station Everett.

- Destroyer Squadron 1 (DesRon 1) (Pacific Fleet)
- Destroyer Squadron 2 (U.S. Atlantic Fleet)
- Destroyer Squadron 3: In late 1941, Destroyer Squadron 3, like Destroyer Squadron 5, was composed of one Porter-class flagship plus two four-ship divisions of Mahan-class 1,500-tonners: USS Clark, flag; USS Cummings; USS Reid, and six more. All except Downes commissioned in 1936.
- Destroyer Squadron 4
- Destroyer Squadron 5: In late 1941, Destroyer Squadron 5 was composed of one Porter-class flagship plus two four-ship divisions of Mahan-class 1,500-tonners. HMNZS Canterbury operated with the squadron briefly in the early 1970s.
- Destroyer Squadron 6 (Atlantic) (Pascagoula, Mississippi, when part of Western Hemisphere Group; included Hall, Ticonderoga, and Yorktown c.1998). In April 1994, Commander, Destroyer Squadron 6 changed homeport to Pascagoula, Mississippi, and subsequently was dual-hatted as Commander, Naval Surface Group Pascagoula. In January 1996, as a result of a reorganization of the United States Atlantic Fleet, Commander, Naval Surface Group Pascagoula was renamed Commander, Regional Support Group Pascagoula. In April 1998, as the result of yet another reorganization, COMDESRON 6 shifted operational control to Commander, Western Hemisphere Group, and was redesignated as a Tactical Squadron. In December 1999, COMDESRON 6 was redesignated as a Tactical/Readiness Squadron under the operational control of Commander, Naval Surface Group 2. At one point, the composition of Destroyer Squadron 6 included FFG-16 at Mayport, FFG 22 at Charleston, SC, USS Samuel Eliot Morison (FFG-13) at Charleston, SC, FFG 15 at Norfolk, and FFG 20 and FFG 21 at Pascagoula.
- Destroyer Squadron 7 (Pacific)
- Destroyer Squadron 8
- Destroyer Squadron 9: Destroyer Squadron Nine was first formed in 1920. Homeported in Charleston, South Carolina, the Squadron consisted of 18 World War I "Four Pipers". In July 1921 the Squadron moved to Newport, Rhode Island, where it operated until it was disestablished in May 1930. The Squadron was reestablished in 1937 in the Pacific Fleet. In November 1942 the Squadron was homeported in Recife, Brazil where the Commodore was also assigned Station Commander. Reestablished in 1946 in the United States Pacific Fleet, based on the U.S. West Coast.
- Destroyer Squadron 10 (Atlantic) The fourth squadron of 1,630-ton destroyers formed in World War II and the first composed of Gleaves-class destroyers was Destroyer Squadron 10. After World War II, the squadron, known as "Lightning 10", was a readiness squadron—since decommissioned by the Navy—one of two such destroyer units in Norfolk.
- Destroyer Squadron 11: Involved in the Honda Point Disaster in the 1920s. From 1939, Destroyer Squadron 11 of destroyers all commissioned between January and March 1941. After shakedown, the squadron joined the North Atlantic Neutrality Patrol, where, south of Iceland on 17 October 1941, USS Kearny became the first US warship torpedoed by a German U-boat. After the war based in the Pacific; USS Arnold J. Isbell was part of Destroyer Division 112, DesRon 11, in 1955.
- Destroyer Squadron 12
- Destroyer Squadron 14: became Naval Surface Squadron 14 on 31 July 2015. CNSS 14 was to serve as the Type Commander's Executive Agent in Mayport, providing support to all non-LCS ships to ensure they are crewed, trained, equipped and maintained in accordance with Commander, Naval Surface Force Atlantic policies and direction. The squadron was to serve as the Immediate Superior in Command for USS Carney, USS Sullivans, USS Roosevelt, USS Simpson, USS Tornado, USS Zephyr, and USS Shamal.
- Destroyer Squadron 15/Commander, Task Force 71 (Pacific) A permanently Forward Deployed DESTROYER Squadron, and SEVENTH Fleet Theater Surface Warfare Commander forward deployed from Yokosuka, Japan. Consists of USS Barry (DDG-52), USS Benfold (DDG-65), USS Milius (DDG-69), USS Higgins (DDG-76), USS Howard (DDG-83), USS Dewey (DDG-105), USS Ralph Johnson (DDG-114), USS Rafael Peralta (DDG-115).
- Destroyer Squadron 17 (Pacific): flagship USS Coontz (DDG-40) in 1962. With Cruiser-Destroyer Group Five in the 1990s.
- Destroyer Squadron 18 (Atlantic): Destroyer Squadron 18 was first established May 28, 1943, when Commander William K. Mendenhall, Jr. broke his pennant in USS Frankford (DD-497) at the Destroyer Base in San Diego, California. The squadron was composed of nine ships. Destroyer Squadron 18 shifted to the east coast via the Panama Canal and commenced convoy escort duties between the United States and Europe. USS Ammen (DD-527) joined the squadron in the spring of 1952 in the Atlantic after reconditioning. USS Sampson (DDG-10) joined Destroyer Squadron 18 and Destroyer Division 182 (DesDiv 182) in July 1962. Destroyer Squadron 18 was reestablished on September 1, 1995, having been previously disestablished in 1973. Commander, Destroyer Squadron 18 was assigned to the USS Enterprise Battle Group and served as Commander Task Force 60/Battle Force Sixth Fleet in the Mediterranean Sea and Adriatic Sea. April 2000 showed the departure of USS Klakring (FFG 42) transferred to Destroyer Squadron Fourteen in Mayport FL. But another warship USS McFaul (DDG-74) came soon after.
- Destroyer Squadron 20: USS Taylor (DD-468), a Fletcher-class destroyer began her naval career with the Atlantic Fleet in 1942. Assigned to Destroyer Squadron 20, she trained at Casco Bay, Maine, and made her shakedown cruise in the northern Atlantic before beginning duty as a coastwise convoy escort. The latter duty lasted until mid-November when she escorted a transatlantic convoy to a point just off Casablanca.
- Destroyer Squadron 21 (Pacific): The squadron's history began on 1 March 1943, when the first ships of the then-new Fletcher-class destroyers, having been deployed to Guadalcanal in the Solomon Islands were grouped into Destroyer Squadron 21, part of Vice Admiral William F. Halsey's South Pacific Area. The squadron was disestablished after the war on 31 December 1945 but was reformed from Destroyer Squadron 18 at a later date.
- Destroyer Squadron 22 2010 composition included: USS Truxtun (DDG-103), USS Nitze (DDG-94), USS Mason (DDG-87), USS McFaul (DDG-74), USS Mahan (DDG-72), USS Cole (DDG-67), and USS Elrod (FFG-55).
- Destroyer Squadron 23 (Pacific)
- Destroyer Squadron 24 - disestablished effective 30 September 2011, IAW Directive 5400.7475 (11) OPNAV Disestablishment OF Commander, Destroyer Squadron two-four, dated 4/4/2011.
- Destroyer Squadron 25 (Pacific)
- Destroyer Squadron 26 From Korea to Vietnam and from the Caribbean to the Middle East, Destroyer Squadron Twenty-Six has served the United States for over 50 years. In 1950, four general-purpose destroyers established the squadron and saw combat action in Korea until 1952. Following the end of the Korean War, the squadron departed the Pacific for a new homeport in Norfolk, Virginia. In July 1964, Destroyer Squadron Twenty-Six became one of the Navy's three all-guided missile squadrons consisting of six modern and versatile destroyers. The squadron saw combat action in Southeast Asia with the Pacific Fleet from 1964 to 1970. From 1971 to 1974, Destroyer Squadron Twenty-Six was selected by the Chief of Naval Operations, Admiral Elmo Zumwalt, to evaluate a new staffing concept in which ships would be crewed and commanded by outstanding officers one rank junior to those normally assigned. Whether deployed or in homeport (Norfolk, VA), DESRON 26 reports administratively and operationally to Commander Carrier Strike Group Ten. In 2012, USS Gettysburg (CG-64) and Mitscher were detached from DesRon 22 to Destroyer Squadron 26 for the UK's Joint Warrior 12-2 exercise.
- Destroyer Squadron 28 -
- Destroyer Squadron 31 (Pacific) - Destroyer Squadron 31 first appeared in the USN Organization List in September 1939. During World War II, COMDESRON 31 ships saw duty as members of the Northeastern Escort Force in Atlantic Fleet convoy escort operations. One squadron ship, USS Truxton (DD 229) was credited with the first sighting of an enemy submarine in the “Short-of-War” period just prior to World War II. On 31 October 1941, another squadron ship, USS REUBEN JAMES (DDG-245) became the first U.S. warship lost to enemy action during World War II when she was torpedoed by a German U-Boat while on convoy escort operations. Disestablished in San Diego, California following World War II, COMDESRON 31 remained inactive until 1 February 1968, when the squadron was reactivated as a unit of the Seventh Fleet operating in waters off Southeast Asia. Deactivated again in early 1970, the squadron was reactivated for a second time on 15 June 1971 and has remained on continuous active duty since then.
- Destroyer Squadron 33 (Pearl Harbor)
- Destroyer Squadron 35 (Pearl Harbor)
- Destroyer Squadron 36 (see http://dangrusdav.tripod.com/command.htm)
- Destroyer Squadron 40 (Fourth Fleet)
- Destroyer Squadron 50 (Fifth Fleet) - Active 1943-45, reestablished 1994.
- Destroyer Squadron 60 - reactivated in the Mediterranean in the twenty-first century.

=== List of cruiser-destroyer groups ===
==== U.S. Atlantic Fleet ====
- Cruiser-Destroyer Group 2 (former CruDesFlot 2)
- Cruiser-Destroyer Group 4 - had USS Tidewater (AD-31) as flagship from 10 September to 13 November 1970
- Cruiser-Destroyer Group 8 (former CruDesFlot 8)
- Cruiser-Destroyer Group 12 (former CruDesFlot 12, re-designated 30 June 1973)

==== U.S. Pacific Fleet ====
- Cruiser-Destroyer Group 1 (redesignated Carrier Strike Group Fifteen on 1 October 2004)
- Cruiser-Destroyer Group 3 (ex Cruiser Division 1, became CruDesFlot 11 April 11, 1962, now Carrier Strike Group 9)
- Cruiser-Destroyer Group 5 (former CruDesFlot 9)

==== Cruiser-destroyer flotillas ====
- Cruiser-Destroyer Flotilla 6 - During the Cuban Missile Crisis, Rear Admiral John W. Ailes III, ComCRUDESFLOT 6, took command of Task Group 136.1, comprising Newport News, USS Canberra, USS MacDonough (DLG-8), and USS Lawrence (DDG-4), as well as the destroyers of DESDIV 182. Then Rear Admiral Richard G. Colbert commanded the flotilla from June 1965 (1964? )to 1966 at Charleston, South Carolina. Prior to assuming command as COMNAVSUPACT DANANG, Rear Admiral Emmett P. Bonner commanded Cruiser-Destroyer Flotilla 6 from 1967–68, homeported in Charleston. His flagship was USS Leahy (DLG-16); he served concurrently as COMMINELANT homeported in Charleston.
- Cruiser-Destroyer Flotilla 7 (Rear Adm Zumwalt took command, San Diego, July 24, 1965, to July 1966) Rear Admiral Robert Salzer assumed command of Cruiser Destroyer Flotilla 7 in September 1970 and upon the disestablishment of that Flotilla on 16 March 1971 transferred to command of Cruiser-Destroyer Flotilla 3.
