= Roy Kitchener =

U.S. Navy admiral

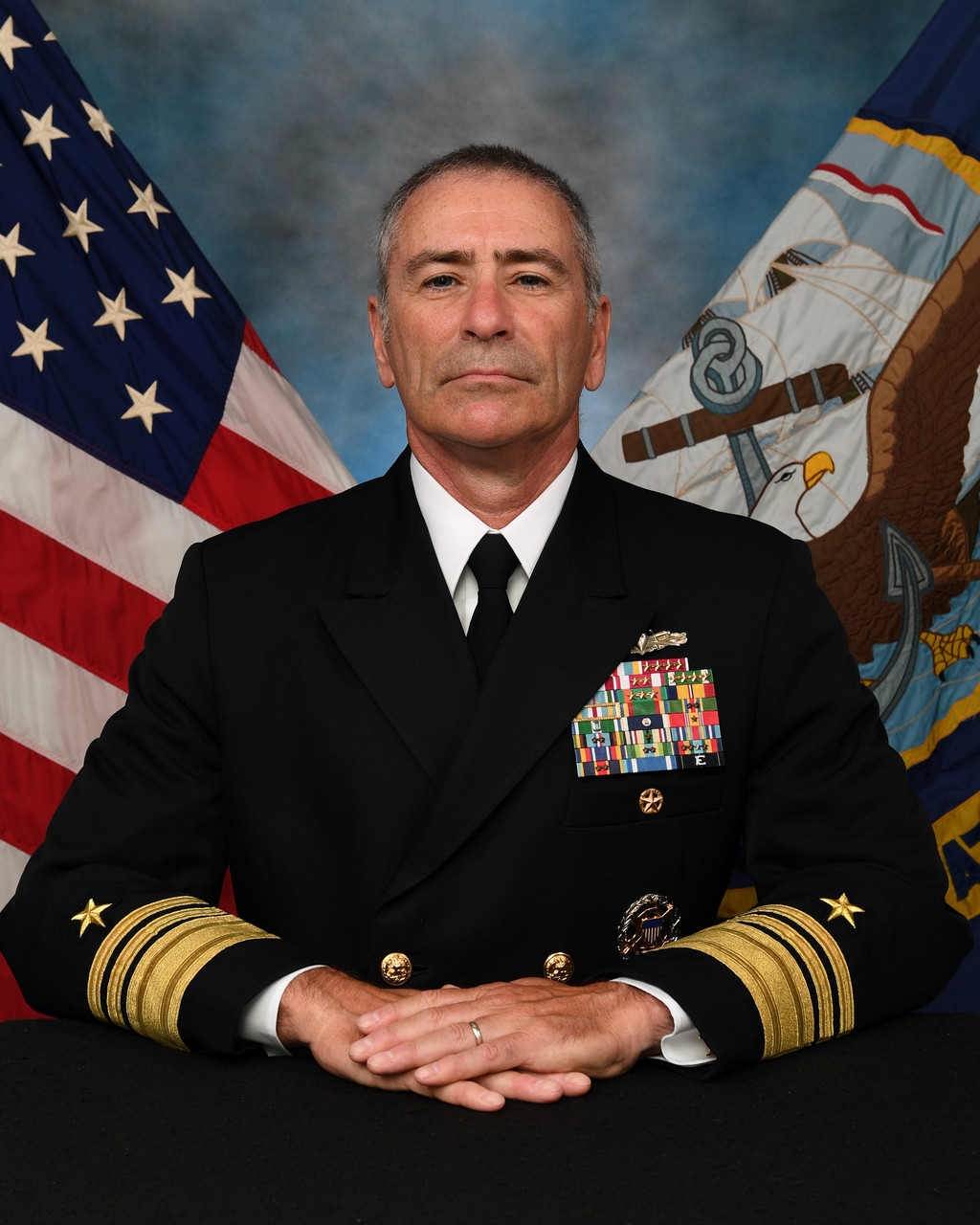
- Born: 1962 (age 63–64); Trumbull, Connecticut, U.S.
- Military career
- Allegiance: United States
- Branch: United States Navy
- Service years: 1984–2023
- Rank: Vice Admiral
- Commands: Naval Surface Forces; Naval Surface Force, U.S. Pacific Fleet; Naval Surface Forces Atlantic; Expeditionary Strike Group 2 USS Princeton; USS Higgins; USS John Paul Jones

Roy Ian Kitchener (born 1962) is a retired United States Navy vice admiral who last served as the Commander of the Naval Surface Forces and Naval Surface Force, U.S. Pacific Fleet. He previously served as the Commander of the Naval Surface Forces Atlantic. Kitchener earned a B.A. degree in political science from Unity College in 1984 and later received an M.A. degree in national security affairs from the Naval Postgraduate School specializing in Western Hemisphere studies.

Military offices
Preceded by Cynthia Thebaud	Commander of Expeditionary Strike Group 2; 2016–2017	Succeeded by Jeffrey W. Hughes
Preceded by Shoshana Chatfield	United States Deputy Military Representative to the NATO Military Committee; 2017–2019	Succeeded by Stephen C. Evans
Preceded by Jesse A. Wilson Jr.	Commander of the Naval Surface Forces Atlantic; 2019–2020	Succeeded by Charles B. Cooper II
Preceded by Richard A. Brown	Commander of the Naval Surface Forces and Naval Surface Force, U.S. Pacific Fleet; 2020–2023	Succeeded by Yvette M. Davids; Acting
