= Lee Baggett Jr. =

American admiral (1927–1999)

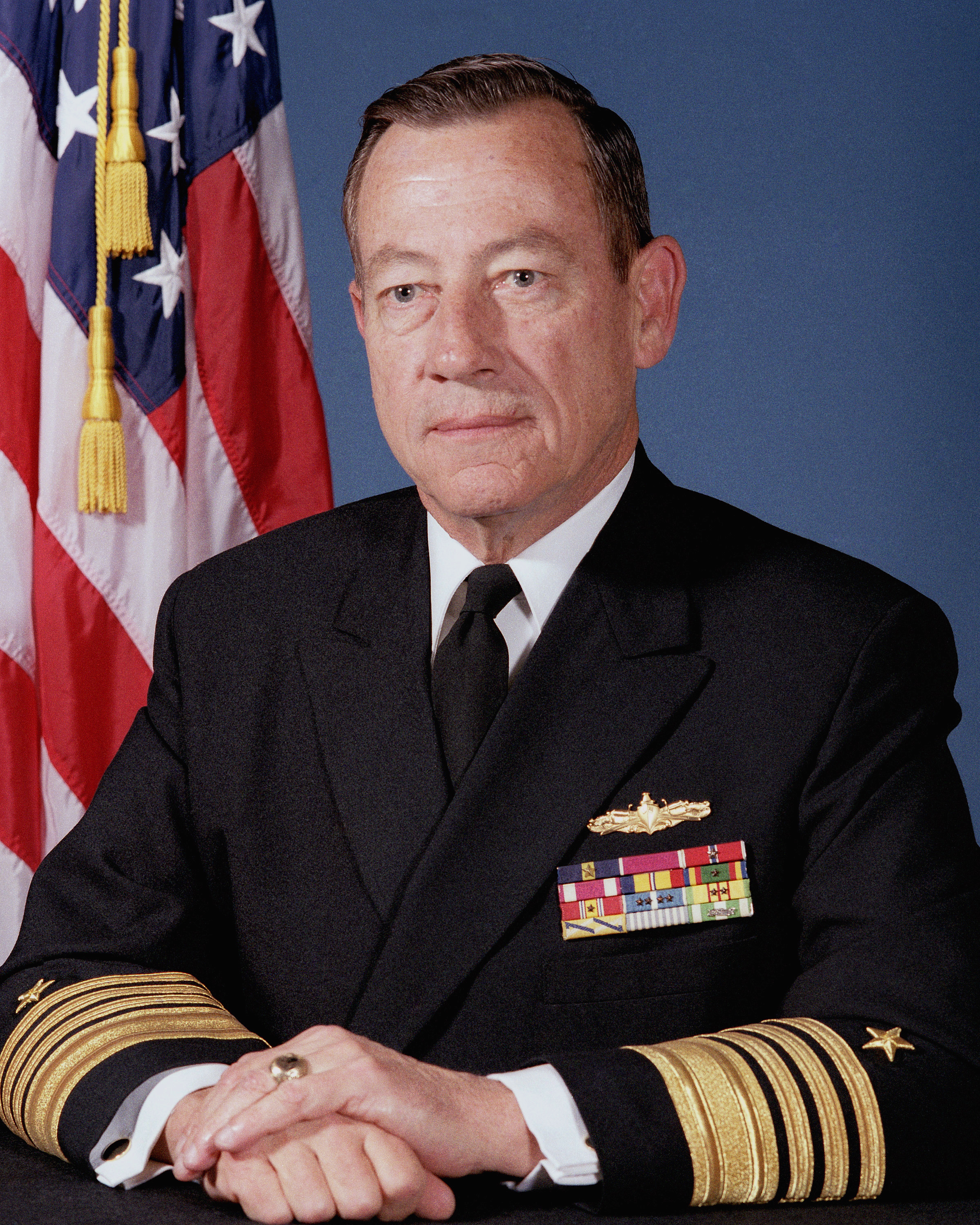
- Born: January 11, 1927; Oxford, Mississippi, U.S.
- Died: August 10, 1999 (aged 72); San Diego, California, U.S.
- Military career
- Allegiance: United States
- Branch: United States Navy
- Service years: 1950–1988
- Rank: Admiral
- Commands: United States Atlantic Command; United States Naval Forces Europe; Naval Surface Force Pacific; Naval Surface Group Middle Pacific; USS Reeves; USS Decatur; USS Firm; USS Courlan
- Conflicts: Korean War; Vietnam War
- Awards: Defense Distinguished Service Medal; Navy Distinguished Service Medal (2); Legion of Merit; Bronze Star Medal (2); Meritorious Service Medal

Lee J. Baggett Jr. (January 11, 1927 – August 10, 1999) was a four star admiral in the United States Navy who served as Commander in Chief Europe in 1985 and Commander in Chief of the United States Atlantic Command from 1985 to 1988.

A native of Oxford, Mississippi, Baggett studied civil engineering at the University of Mississippi for two years before entering the United States Naval Academy. He was commissioned in 1950 after earning his B.S. degree. He began his service aboard the USS Frank Knox (DDR 742) in 1950, and he subsequently served in USS Charles J. Badger (DD 657). Baggett later received an M.S. degree in nuclear physics from the Naval Postgraduate School. His May 1958 thesis entitled π^{−}-p Elastic Scattering and Single Pion Production at 0.939 Bev/c was based on research conducted at the Radiation Laboratory of the University of California, Berkeley. Baggett also studied at the Naval War College.

A career surface warfare officer, Baggett commanded two minesweepers and two guided missile destroyers. As a vice admiral, he served as commander, Naval Surface Force Pacific from May 1979 to July 1982.

From 27 November 1985 he was the Supreme Allied Commander Atlantic and Commander in Chief US Atlantic Command.

Baggett died in 1999 of heart disease. He was interred at Fort Rosecrans National Cemetery.

== Awards and decorations ==

Badge	Surface Warfare Officer Pin		
1st Row	Defense Distinguished Service Medal		
2nd row	Navy Distinguished Service Medal with one gold award star	Legion of Merit	Bronze Star Medal with award star
3rd row	Meritorious Service Medal	Combat Action Ribbon	Navy Unit Commendation with one bronze service star
4th row	National Defense Service Medal with service star	Korean Service Medal with four service stars	Vietnam Service Medal with two service stars
5th row	Vietnam Navy Distinguished Service Order, 2nd class	United Nations Korea Medal	Vietnam Campaign Medal
