= Admiral Curtis =

Admiral Curtis may refer to:

- Berwick Curtis (1876–1965), British Royal Navy vice admiral
- D.C. Curtis (born 1953), U.S. Navy vice admiral
- Lucius Curtis (1786–1869), British Royal Navy admiral
- Roger Curtis (1746–1816), British Royal Navy admiral

== See also ==
- Alban Curteis (1887–1961), British Royal Navy admiral
