= Brendan McLane =

US Navy admiral

Brendan R. McLane
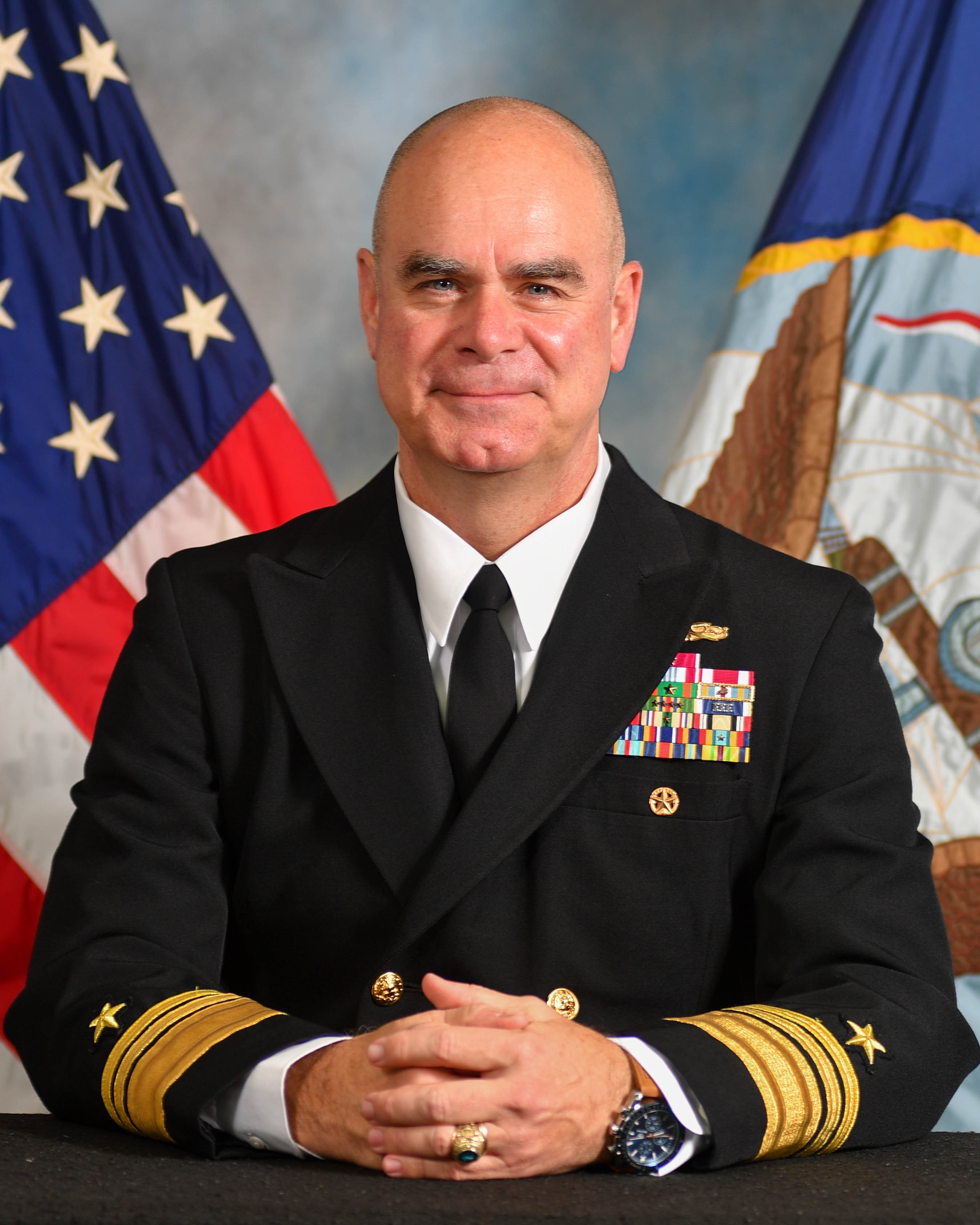
- Official portrait, 2023
- Born: 1968 (age 57–58)
- Education: United States Naval Academy (BS); Troy University (MPA); United States Naval War College (MNSA)
- Military career
- Allegiance: United States
- Branch: United States Navy
- Service years: 1990–present
- Rank: Vice Admiral
- Commands: Naval Surface Forces; Naval Surface Force, U.S. Pacific Fleet; Naval Surface Force, Atlantic; Carrier Strike Group 10; Navy Recruiting Command; Task Force 55; Coalition Task Force 152; Destroyer Squadron 50; USS Carney (DDG-64)
- Conflicts: Iraq War
- Awards: Legion of Merit (3); Bronze Star Medal

Brendan Reid McLane (born 1968) is a United States Navy vice admiral and surface warfare officer who has served as the commander of Naval Surface Forces and Naval Surface Force, U.S. Pacific Fleet since 21 December 2023. He most recently served as Commander, Naval Surface Force Atlantic from May 2021 to June 2023. He previously served as Special Assistant to the commander of the United States Fleet Forces Command, with terms as commander of Carrier Strike Group 10 from May to December 2020 and commander of Navy Recruiting Command from July 2018 to April 2020.

A 1990 graduate of the United States Naval Academy with a Bachelor of Science degree in history, McLane also earned a Master of Science degree in public administration from Troy University, as well as a master's degree in national security affairs from the Naval War College. He completed Massachusetts Institute of Technology's Seminar XXI and the Naval Operational Planning Course (now the Maritime Advanced Warfighting School).

In April 2023, McLane was nominated for promotion to vice admiral and assignment as commander of Naval Surface Forces and Naval Surface Force, U.S. Pacific Fleet.

Military offices
Preceded by Glenn P. Kuffel Jr.	Commanding Officer of USS Carney (DDG-64); 2008–2010	Succeeded by Richard J. Field
Preceded by Peter A. Garvin	Commander of Navy Recruiting Command; 2018–2020	Succeeded by Dennis Velez
Preceded by Paul J. Schlise	Commander of Carrier Strike Group 10; 2020	Succeeded by Richard Cheeseman Jr.
Preceded by Charles Cooper II	Commander, Naval Surface Force Atlantic; 2021–2023	Succeeded by Joseph F. Cahill III
Preceded by Yvette M. Davids; Acting	Commander of the Naval Surface Forces and Naval Surface Force, U.S. Pacific Fleet; 2023–present	Incumbent
