= D.C. Curtis =

United States admiral

Vice Admiral D.C. Curtis
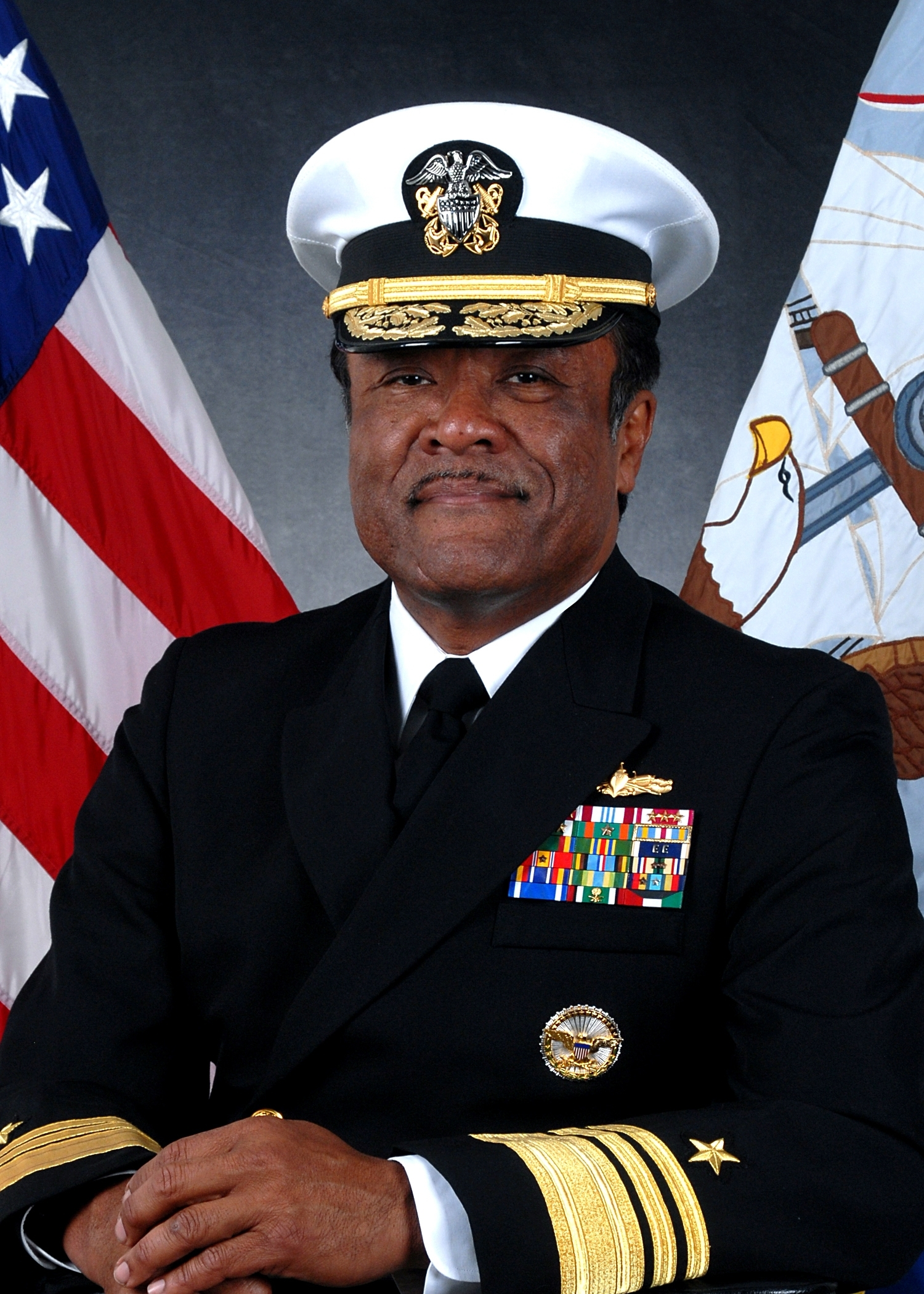
- Vice Admiral D.C. Curtis, official USN photograph 2009
- Born: December 13, 1953 (age 72); Japan
- Education: United States Naval Academy (BS); Central Michigan University (MS)
- Military career
- Allegiance: United States of America
- Branch: United States Navy
- Service years: 1976–2011
- Rank: Vice Admiral
- Commands: Naval Surface Forces; Naval Surface Force, Atlantic; Naval Surface Group 2 Carrier Strike Group 11; Destroyer Squadron 14; USS Wainwright (CG-28); USS Donald B. Beary (FFT-1085)
- Conflicts: Operation Enduring Freedom
- Awards: Legion of Merit; Defense Meritorious Service Medal; Meritorious Service Medal

Derwood Clayiborne Curtis (born December 13, 1953) is a retired vice admiral in the United States Navy who served as the Commander, Naval Surface Forces and concurrently Commander, Naval Surface Force, U.S. Pacific Fleet from March 2008 to June 2011.

== Service ==
Born in Japan and raised in Chicago, Curtis graduated from the United States Naval Academy in 1976 where he earned a bachelor's degree in political science. Following commissioning, he attended the Surface Warfare Basic School in Newport, Rhode Island, and was awarded the Arleigh Burke Award.

Curtis served in a variety of sea and shore assignments. At sea, his assignments include USS Moinester (FF-1097), USS Thorn (DD-988), USS Dahlgren (DDG-43) and Cruiser-Destroyer Group 2/George Washington Battle Group. He also served as executive officer, USS Scott (DDG-995), chief of staff to Commander, 2nd Fleet/Commander, Striking Fleet Atlantic/Task Force 120, and Deputy Commander, U.S. Naval Forces Southern Command. His command tours include USS Wainwright (CG-28), USS Donald B. Beary (FFT-1085), Destroyer Squadron 14, Naval Surface Group 2 and Commander, Carrier Strike Group 11/Nimitz Strike Group.

His shore assignments include the U.S. Naval Academy as a company officer; the Bureau of Naval Personnel as the senior year group detailer; the Chief of Naval Operations Aegis/DDG-51 Program Office; senior military assistant in the Office of Naval Warfare; executive assistant and Naval aide to the 71st and 72nd Secretaries of the Navy; and Navy Europe Programs, Strategy and Policy, and director, Transformation Activities for Commander, U.S. Naval Forces, Europe – 6th Fleet. His most recent assignment was as the 51st commander, Naval Surface Force, Atlantic and deputy commander, Naval Surface Forces where he served as the chief readiness officer for the Surface Warfare Enterprise.

Curtis’ personal decorations include the Legion of Merit, Defense Meritorious Service Medal, Meritorious Service Medal, Navy Commendation Medal, Navy Achievement Medal and other awards.

He holds a Master of Science degree in administration from Central Michigan University and is a graduate of the National Defense University and the NATO Defense College Senior Course.
