= Terrance T. Etnyre =

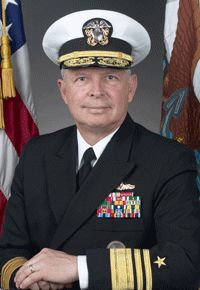
- Born: December 14, 1947 (age 78); Annapolis, Maryland, United States
- Education: University of Michigan
- Military career
- Allegiance: United States
- Branch: United States Navy
- Service years: 1970–2008
- Rank: Vice Admiral
- Commands: USS Lynde McCormick (DDG-8); USS Arkansas (CGN-41)
- Awards: Defense Superior Service Medal; 6 Legion of Merits; Bronze Star with Combat V 3 Meritorious Service Medals; 2 Navy Commendation Medals; Navy Achievement Medal

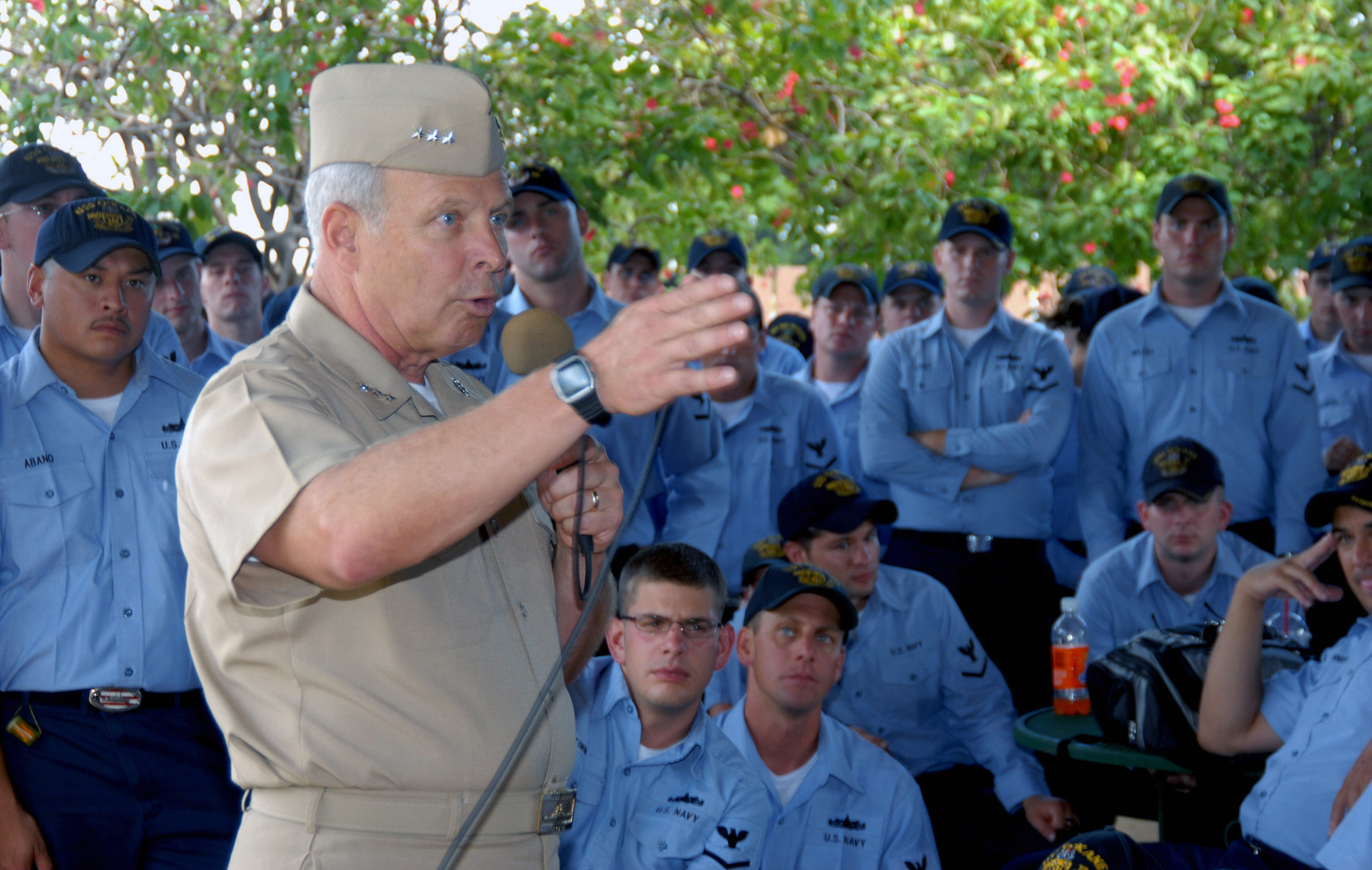
Vice Adm. Terrance T. Etnyre, commander of Naval Surface Forces, speaks to sailors at Pearl Harbor, September 2007

Vice Admiral Terrance Thomas Etnyre is a retired flag officer of the United States Navy.

Etnyre graduated from the University of Michigan in 1970, and was commissioned an ensign in July 1971 at Officer Candidate School, Newport, Rhode Island. His early sea and shore assignments included: Damage Control Assistant in Hammerberg (DE-1015) homeported in Naples, Italy; Repair Officer in Enterprise (CVN-65); Plant Performance Evaluation Officer for the AIW nuclear propulsion prototype, Idaho Falls, Idaho; Engineer Officer, Mississippi (CGN-40); Member, Nuclear Propulsion Examining Board, Commander in Chief, U.S. Atlantic Fleet; and Executive Officer in Long Beach (CGN-9).

In December 1987, Vice Adm. Etnyre assumed command of Lynde McCormick (DDG-8). Under his command, Lynde McCormick, as a part of Surface Action Group Bravo, participated in "Operation Praying Mantis", the United States' response to the mining of the Persian Gulf and the mine damage to Samuel B. Roberts (FFG-58). Following command, he was assigned as Special Assistant for Nuclear Propulsion on the staffs of Commander, Naval Surface Force, U.S. Pacific Fleet and Commander, Naval Air Forces, U.S. Pacific Fleet and Senior Member of the Nuclear Propulsion Mobile Training Team. He then served in the office of the Chief of Naval Operations, Surface Warfare, as the Aegis Cruiser/Destroyer and Anti-Air Warfare Branch Head.

In November 1992, Vice Adm. Etnyre assumed command of Arkansas (CGN-41). During this tour, Arkansas received two Battle Efficiency Awards and three consecutive Commander in Chief, U.S. Pacific Fleet, Golden Anchor awards for excellence in personnel retention and quality of life programs. Vice Adm. Etnyre reported in September 1995 as Executive Assistant to the Commander in Chief, U.S. Pacific Fleet. From June 1996 to June 1998 he was the Director, Plans Division in the Office of the Assistant Secretary of Defense for Strategy and Threat Reduction.

He was selected for flag rank in 1998 and served as Commander, South Atlantic Force, U.S. Atlantic Fleet. Vice Adm. Etnyre served as Vice Commander, Naval Sea Systems Command until May 2001. He served as Commander, Cruiser-Destroyer Group One from June 2001 to June 2002. His last assignment was as Commander, Naval Surface Forces Pacific from March 2005 to February 2008.

His personal awards included the Defense Superior Service Medal, the Legion of Merit (six awards), the Bronze Star with Combat V, the Meritorious Service Medal (three awards), the Navy Commendation Medal (two awards) and the Navy Achievement Medal.
