= Yvette M. Davids =

United States Navy admiral

Yvette Davids
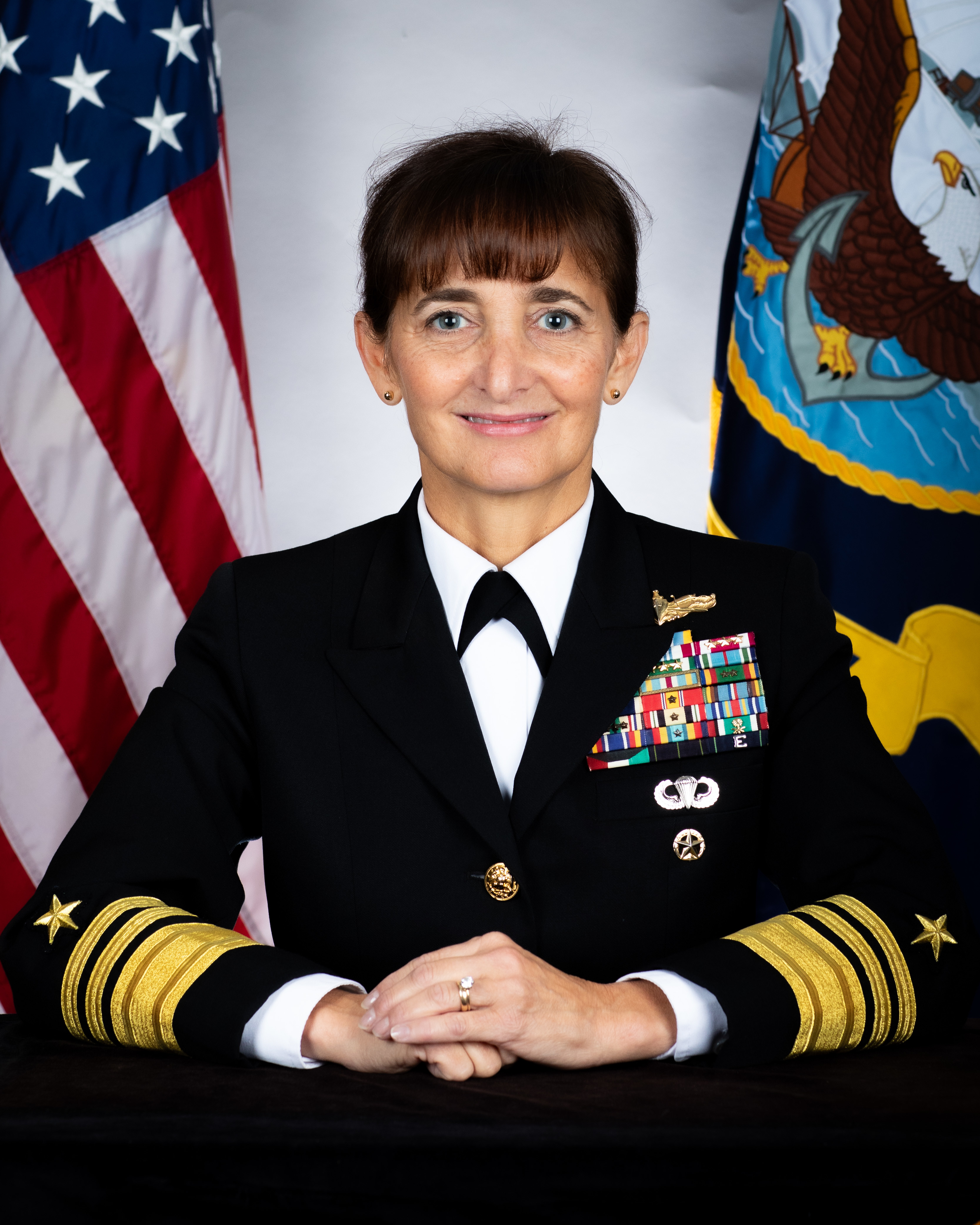
- Official portrait, 2025
- Born: Yvette Marie Gonzalez; 29 March 1967 (age 59); Bexar County, Texas, U.S.
- Education: United States Naval Academy (BS); Naval War College (MA); National Defense University (MS)
- Spouse: Rear Admiral Keith Davids
- Military career
- Allegiance: United States
- Branch: United States Navy
- Service years: 1989–present
- Rank: Vice Admiral
- Commands: United States Naval Academy; Naval Surface Force, U.S. Pacific Fleet (acting); Carrier Strike Group 11; USS Bunker Hill; USS Curts
- Conflicts: Gulf War; Iraq War
- Awards: Defense Superior Service Medal; Legion of Merit (2)

Yvette Marie Davids (born 29 March 1967) is a United States Navy vice admiral who served as the Superintendent of the United States Naval Academy from 11 January 2024 to 15 August 2025. She was the first woman to serve as superintendent.

== Early life and education ==
Yvette Marie Gonzalez grew up in San Antonio, Texas. She graduated with a Bachelor of Science in Oceanography from the United States Naval Academy in 1989 and was commissioned as an ensign. While studying at the Naval Academy she earned All-America Crew honors in Intercollegiate Sailing for both 1987 and 1989. She later received a Master of Arts in National Security and Strategic Studies from the Naval War College in 2002 and a Master of Science in National Resource Strategy from the Dwight D. Eisenhower School for National Security and Resource Strategy at the Industrial College of the Armed Forces of the National Defense University in 2012.

== Naval career ==
Yvette Davids served as executive officer of the destroyers USS Higgins (DDG-76) and USS Benfold (DDG-65). She later commanded the frigate USS Curts (FFG-38) from April 2007 to November 2008.

Yvette Davids assumed command of the cruiser USS Bunker Hill (CG-52) from Captain Michael J. Ford in San Diego on 8 November 2012. She was succeeded by Captain Sterling W. Dawley in Singapore on 3 October 2014.

Davids' promotion to rear admiral (lower half) was authorized by the United States Senate on 25 May 2017. Davids served as senior military advisor to the Assistant Secretary of State for Political-Military Affairs. She assumed command of Carrier Strike Group 11 in May 2019. She was succeeded by Rear Admiral James A. Kirk in May 2020. Her promotion to rear admiral (upper half) had been approved by the Senate on 20 March 2020.

In May 2022, it was announced that Davids would be assigned as special assistant to the director of the Navy Staff, simultaneously serving as director of the Learning to Action Drive Team.

In April 2023, Davids was nominated for promotion to vice admiral and assignment as the Superintendent of the United States Naval Academy. Pending confirmation, she was assigned in an interim capacity as the commander of Naval Surface Forces and Naval Surface Force, United States Pacific Fleet, succeeding Roy Kitchener until December 2023. She was promoted to vice admiral and began serving as the Superintendent of the U.S. Naval Academy on 11 January 2024.

In July 2025, she was nominated for reappointment as a vice admiral and assignment as the deputy chief of naval operations for operations, plans, strategy, and warfighting development of the United States Navy.

== Awards and decorations ==

Surface Warfare Officer Pin
Defense Superior Service Medal with bronze oak leaf cluster
Legion of Merit with 4 gold award stars	Defense Meritorious Service Medal	Meritorious Service Medal with 3 gold award stars
Joint Service Commendation Medal	Navy and Marine Corps Commendation Medal with 3 gold award stars	Joint Service Achievement Medal
Navy and Marine Corps Achievement Medal with 1 gold award star	Joint Meritorious Unit Award	Navy Unit Commendation with 2 bronze service stars
Navy "E" Ribbon with four Battle E awards	National Defense Service Medal with bronze service star	Armed Forces Expeditionary Medal
Southwest Asia Service Medal with 3 bronze service stars	Iraq Campaign Medal with bronze service star	Global War on Terrorism Expeditionary Medal
Global War on Terrorism Service Medal	Navy Sea Service Deployment Ribbon with silver service star	Kuwait Liberation Medal
Kuwait Liberation Medal	Navy Rifle Marksmanship Ribbon	Navy Expert Pistol Shot Medal
Army Basic Parachutist Badge

== Personal life ==
Yvette Davids is the daughter of William E. Gonzalez and Magda Margarita (Matos) Gonzalez. She is married to retired Rear Admiral Keith B. Davids, a 1990 Naval Academy graduate and Navy SEAL officer. They have twin sons.

Military offices
Preceded by Donald D. Gabrielson	Commander of Carrier Strike Group 11; 2019–2020	Succeeded by James A. Kirk
Preceded by Roy I. Kitchener	Commander of the Naval Surface Forces and Naval Surface Force, U.S. Pacific Fleet; Acting; 2023	Succeeded by Brendan R. McLane
Preceded by Frederick W. Kacher; Acting	65th Superintendent of the United States Naval Academy; 2024–2025	Succeeded by Michael Borgschulte
