= Robert Samuel Salzer =

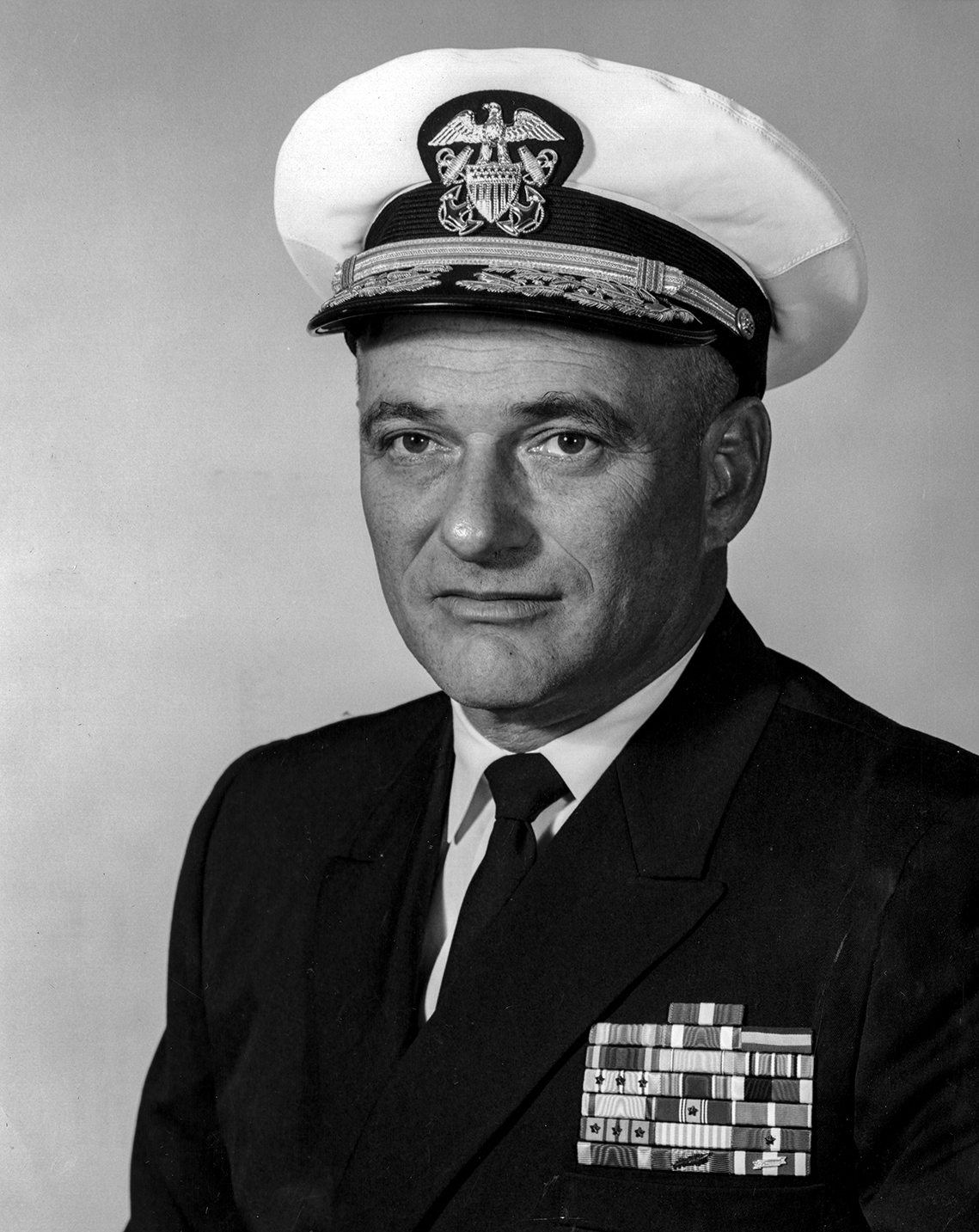
- Born: July 29, 1919; New York City
- Died: January 30, 1988 (aged 68); Bethesda, Maryland
- Military career
- Allegiance: United States
- Branch: United States Navy
- Service years: 1940–1975
- Rank: Vice Admiral
- Commands: USS Summit (AMc-106); USS YMS-347; USS LST-624; USS Abbot (DD-629); USS Bryce Canyon (AD-36); Destroyer Division 132; Destroyer Division 192; Amphibious Squadron 4 Task Force 117; Cruiser Destroyer Flotilla 3 Cruiser Destroyer Flotilla 7 U.S. Naval Forces Vietnam; Amphibious Force, U.S. Pacific Fleet
- Conflicts: World War II; Vietnam War
- Awards: Navy Distinguished Service Medal (3)

Robert Samuel Salzer (29 July 1919 – 30 January 1988) was a Vice Admiral of the United States Navy, who served in World War II, and commanded the United States Naval Forces in Vietnam.

== Biography ==
=== Education ===
Salzer was born in New York City, New York. He attended Phillips Exeter Academy and Yale University, graduating with a Bachelor of Arts degree in Economics in 1940. While at Yale, he was a member of the Naval Reserve Officer Training Corps, and was commissioned an ensign in the U.S. Naval Reserve on 23 December 1940.

=== World War II, 1941-1945 ===
After receiving his commission, Salzer was assigned to the Office of the Chief of Naval Operations until 1942, when he joined the Accentor-class minesweeper Fulmar (AMc-46). In March 1943 he assumed command of the coastal minesweeper Summit (AMc-106), and in July 1943 that of the auxiliary motor minesweeper YMS-347. He then commanded the tank landing ship LST-624 from June 1944 to December 1945, participating in the Lingayen Gulf landings, the Manila Bay-Bicol operations and the occupation of Okinawa.

=== 1946-1964 ===
Salzer returned to the United States and was on inactive status from April to September 1946, before returning to active duty as the executive officer of the replenishment oiler Guadalupe (AO-32). In February 1948 he joined the staff of the Commander of the Fleet Training Group, Narragansett Bay, Rhode Island, as Navigation Officer. After instruction at the Naval Intelligence School from July 1948 until December 1949, he served on the staff of that school. He returned to sea in March 1951 as executive officer of the destroyer Charles H. Roan (DD-853), and in March 1952 became Assistant Intelligence Officer on the staff of Commander Naval Forces, Eastern Atlantic and Mediterranean. In August 1952 he was assigned as an Intelligence Staff Officer on the staff of the Commander in Chief, U.S. European Command, and in April 1954 assumed command of the destroyer Abbot (DD-629).

He was a J-2 Staff Officer on the Joint Staff, Joint Chiefs of Staff, from April 1956 to July 1959, after which he attended the Industrial College of the Armed Forces. In June 1960 Salzer was Assistant for Joint Chiefs of Staff Matters in the Logistics Plans Division, in the Office of the Chief of Naval Operations. He remained there until August 1961, then commanded the destroyer tender Bryce Canyon (AD-36) until January 1963, when he was detached to command Destroyer Division 132. In March 1963 he transferred to command of Destroyer Division 192.

He returned to the Office of the Chief of Naval Operations in May 1964, where he served as Head of the Analytical Support Group until October 1965. He then served as Deputy Program Director for the Fast Deployment Logistic Ship Project.

=== Vietnam War, 1966-1975 ===
Salzer assumed command of Amphibious Squadron 4 in February 1966, serving from 1 April until 25 August 1967, when he became the Commander of River Assault Flotilla 1/River Support Squadron 7/Riverine Assault Force (Task Force 117) on 2 December 1967. He was assigned duty as the Commander of "Operation Sealords" in October 1968.

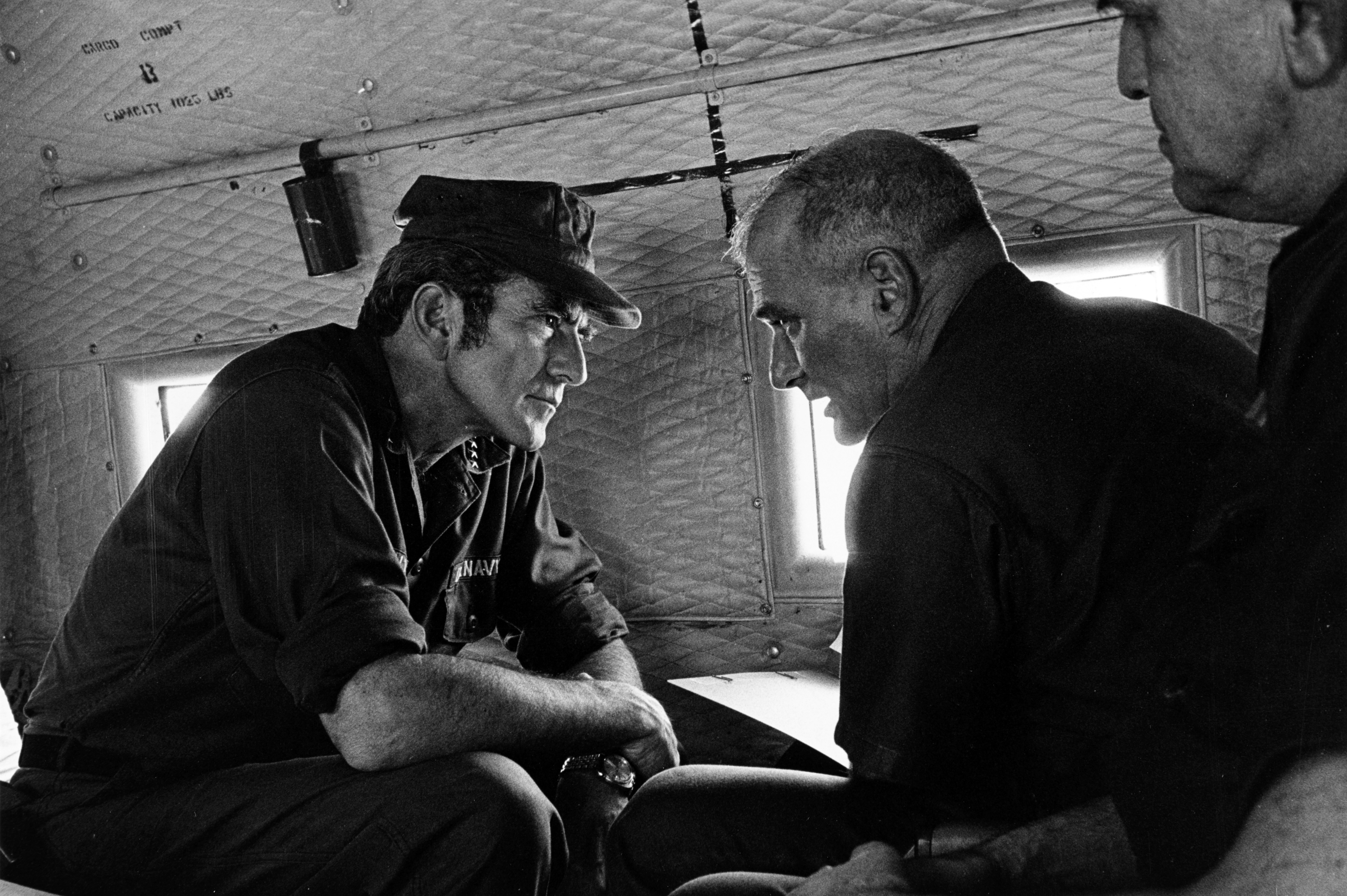
Rear Adm. Salzer meets with CNO Elmo Zumwalt (left) while flying over South Vietnam in May 1971

Salzer returned to the Office of the Chief of Naval Operations as Project Officer of the Future Professional Manpower Requirements Study from November 1968 to December 1969, when he assumed command of Cruiser Destroyer Flotilla 3. He assumed command of Cruiser Destroyer Flotilla 7 in September 1970, and after the disestablishment of that formation on 16 March 1971 returned to command of Cruiser Destroyer Flotilla 3. In April 1971 he was appointed Commander of United States Naval Forces Vietnam and Chief of the Naval Advisory Group, Military Assistance Command, Vietnam.

In September 1972 he became Commander of the Amphibious Force, Pacific Fleet. On the creation of Commander, Naval Surface Forces Pacific in March 1975, he was the first incumbent.

=== Retirement, 1975-1988 ===
Salzer retired in 1975 to McLean, Virginia. He then served as president of the Navy Relief Society, a not for profit organization, that provides relief to members of the Navy and Marine Corps.

Salzer died of heart failure at the National Institutes of Health in Bethesda, Maryland, on January 30, 1988. He was buried at Arlington National Cemetery on February 2, 1988.
