= Destroyer Squadron 28 =

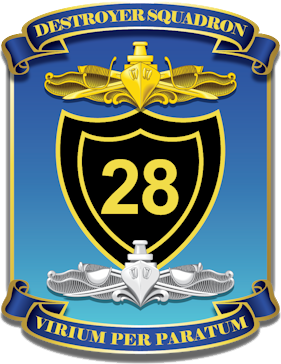
- Active: 1951 – 1971; 1995 – present
- Country: United States
- Branch: United States Navy
- Type: Destroyer Squadron
- Part of: Carrier Strike Group Eight; Commander, Naval Surface Force Atlantic
- Motto: Readiness through Training

Destroyer Squadron 28 (DESRON 28), is a squadron of warships of the United States Navy. It is an operational component of Carrier Strike Group Eight. The squadron was formed in 1951. DESRON 28 was re-established on 1 September 1995, during the most recent reorganization of the Atlantic Fleet surface force. The mission of DESRON 28 is to provide a fully trained, combat ready force of surface combatants.

Destroyer Squadron 28 is a squadron of Arleigh Burke-class destroyers. As of January 2024 it was composed of the following ships:

- USS Gonzalez (DDG-66)
- USS Cole (DDG-67)
- USS Bainbridge (DDG-96)
- USS Forrest Sherman (DDG-98)
- USS Gravely (DDG-107)

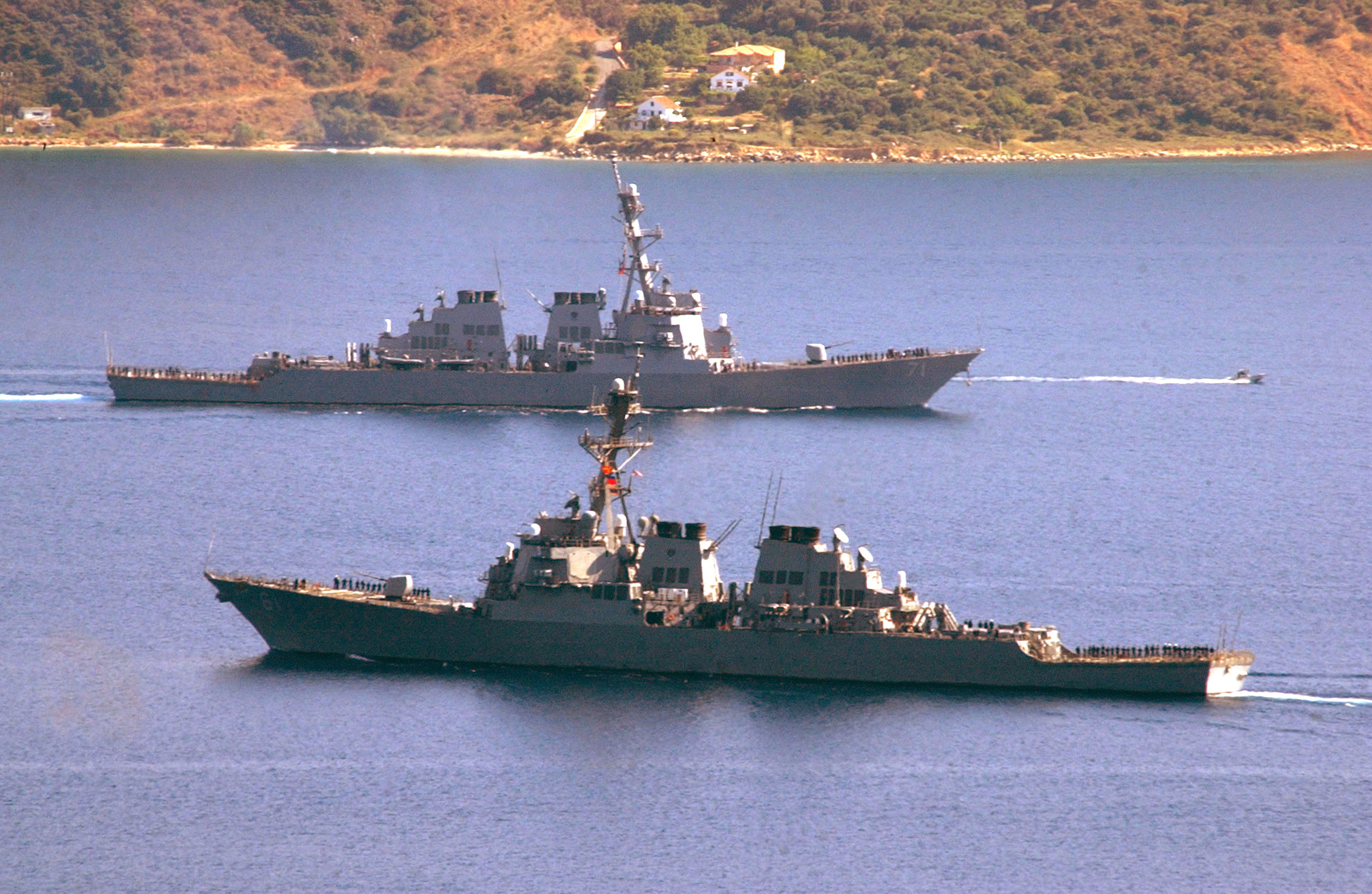
USS Ramage and USS Ross in 2004
