= USS Courlan (AMS-44) =

Minesweeper of the United States Navy

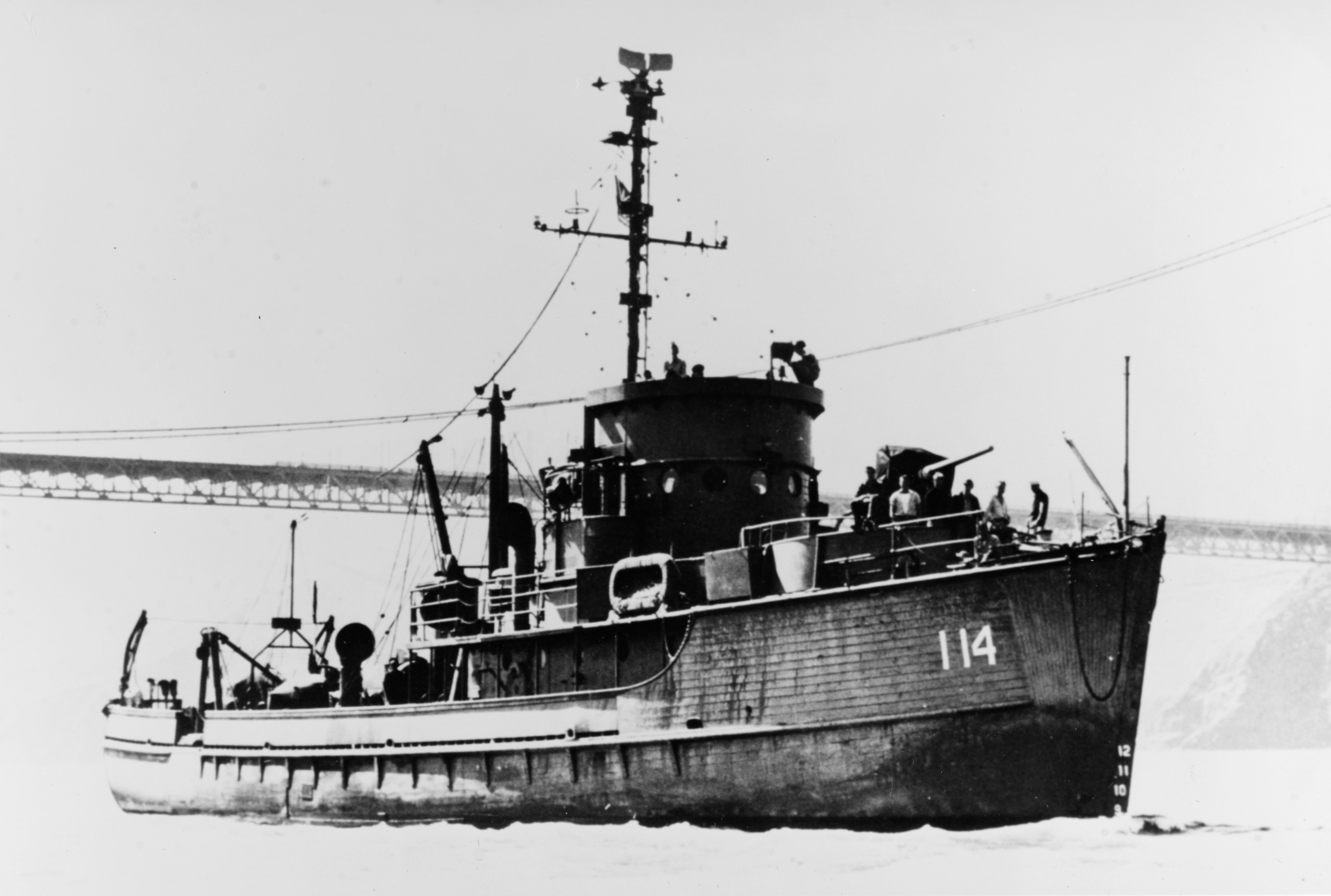
- USS YMS-114 circa 1945

History

United States
- Name: YMS-114
- Laid down: 26 June 1941
- Launched: 13 March 1942
- Commissioned: 12 August 1942
- Renamed: Courlan (AMS-44), 1 September 1947
- Reclassified: MSC(O)-44, 7 February 1955
- Stricken: 1 November 1959
- Fate: fate unknown

General characteristics
- Displacement: 320 tons
- Length: 136 ft (41 m)
- Beam: 24 ft 6 in (7.47 m)
- Draught: 6 ft 1 in (1.85 m)
- Speed: 13 knots
- Complement: 33
- Armament: one 3 in (76 mm) gun mount, two 20 mm machine guns

USS Courlan (AMS-44/MSC(O)-44/YMS-114) was an YMS-1-class auxiliary motor minesweeper acquired by the U.S. Navy for the task of removing mines that had been placed in the water to prevent ships from passing.

The first ship to be named Courlan by the Navy, AMC-44 was constructed at the San Diego Marine Construction Company, San Diego, California.

Courlan served in an "in service" status from 1941 to 1947.

Courlan was reclassified as minesweeper USS Courlan (AMS-44) during September 1947.

She was struck from the Navy list on 1 November 1959.
