= Destroyer Squadron 15 =

Destroyer Squadron 15/Task Force 71
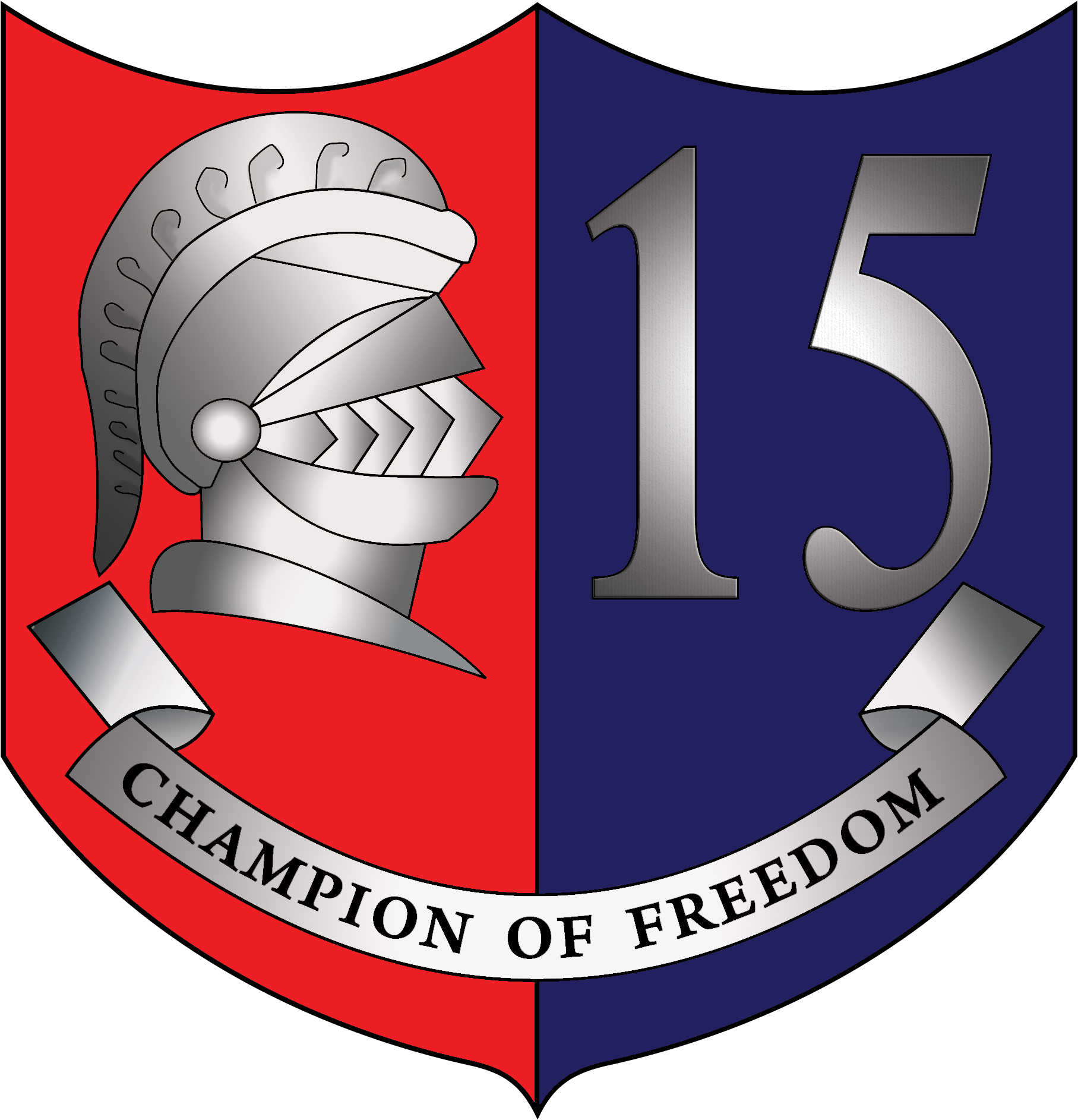
- Founded: 1920
- Country: United States
- Branch: United States Navy
- Type: Destroyer squadron
- Part of: COMSURFPAC
- Garrison/HQ: United States Fleet Activities Yokosuka
- Motto: ”Champion of Freedom”
- Website: https://www.surfpac.navy.mil/cds15/

Commanders
- Current commander: CAPT Neil Gabriel
- Deputy commander: CAPT Matt Noland

Destroyer Squadron 15 is the largest destroyer squadron in the United States Navy consisting of ten Arleigh Burke-class destroyers forward deployed to Yokosuka, Japan. Commander, Destroyer Squadron 15 also serves as Commander, Task Force 71 which includes command and control of independent Cruiser and Destroyer deployments, U.S. Coast Guard (Title 10) deployments, and a host of Allied and partner Navy surface Combatant deployments to the Western Pacific.

== Mission ==
DESRON FIFTEEN is the U.S. Navy's largest Destroyer Squadron and is responsible for the readiness, tactical, and administrative responsibilities for the ten Arleigh Burke Class Destroyers forward deployed to Yokosuka, Japan, as well as the tactical employment of all independent U.S. and Allies Cruiser-Destroyer (CRUDES) and United States Coast Guard Title 10 deployments to the Western Pacific. The Destroyer Squadron Commodore serves as the Immediate Superior in Command (ISIC) of the ships assigned to the squadron. DESRON FIFTEEN ships are the principal surface combatants of Seventh Fleet in the Western Pacific and Indian Oceans. In addition to duties as ISIC for the ships assigned to the squadron, the DESRON FIFTEEN staff also deploys with the George Washington Carrier Strike Group (CSG). During these deployments, the Deputy Commodore serves as Sea Combat Commander (SCC) for the CSG. The SCC responsibilities include Surface Warfare Commander (SUWC), Anti Submarine Warfare Commander (ASWC), Maritime Intercept Operations Coordinator (MIO), Mine Warfare Coordinator (MIW), and Submarine Operational Controlling Authority (SOCA) (responsible for coordinating employment of attack submarines assigned to the CSG).

DESRON FIFTEEN has additional assignments in the Seventh Fleet as Commander, Task Force 71 (CTF-71) the Theater Surface Warfare Commander (TSUWC), Maritime Counter Special Operations Force Commander (MCSOF), Strike Force ASW Commander (SFASWC) and Deputy Ballistic Missile Defense Commander (BMDC).

== History ==
Destroyer Squadron Fifteen was founded in 1920 as a reserve fleet unit. The squadron was disestablished in 1922 and another destroyer squadron was re-designated as Destroyer Squadron Fifteen in 1928. That squadron was then re-designated as Destroyer Squadron 5 in 1931.

Following the U.S. entry into World War II, Destroyer Squadron Fifteen was re-established and fought in Mediterranean battles during the war. In 1945, the squadron was converted to destroyer minesweepers and was again re-designated this time as Mine Squadron 21. In 1946 the squadron was re-activated in the Pacific Fleet but was decommissioned briefly in 1950. Later the same year it was reestablished due to the Korean War. In 1971 the squadron departed San Diego and became a permanently forward deployed squadron stationed in Yokosuka, Japan. Since this time, DESRON FIFTEEN has served as the Sea Combat Commander for USS Midway (CV-41), USS Independence (CV-62), USS Kitty Hawk (CV-63), USS George Washington (CVN-73), and USS Ronald Reagan (CVN-76) carrier strike groups, forward deployed to the Western Pacific.

Destroyer Squadron 15 has taken part in World War II, the Korean War, Vietnam War, Operation Desert Storm, Operation Enduring Freedom and Operation Iraqi Freedom.

The squadron was assigned to Task Force 70 (Battle Force, Seventh Fleet), which had operational control of all carrier strike groups and independently deployed cruisers, destroyers, and frigates that deployed or transited through the 7th Fleet area of operations from 1971 to 2021. In 2021, Commander, U.S. SEVENTH Fleet dissolved Battle Force SEVENTH Fleet and re-designated Commander, Destroyer Squadron FIFTEEN as Commander, Task Force 71 - Theater Surface Warfare Commander for the SEVENTH Fleet Area of Responsibility.

Today, Destroyer Squadron FIFTEEN, as Theater Surface Warfare Commander exercises control of the Guided Missile Destroyers assigned to the squadron as well as all independent deployments of US Cruisers, Destroyers, and US Coast Guard Cutters deployed to the Seventh Fleet area of responsibility. DESRON 15 is also the lead coordinating authority for all Allied and partner nation Cruiser/Destroyer Surface Action Group operations throughout the AOR and regularly hosts Liaison Naval Officers (LNO) and staff exchanges with the Japanese Maritime Self Defense Force, Republic of Korea Navy, French Navy, Italian Navy, Royal Australian Navy, Royal Canadian Navy, Royal New Zealand Navy, Royal Navy, and the navies of dozens of other partner nations to coordinate operate throughout the Western Pacific. In addition to these duties, DESRON FIFTEEN still provides Sea Combat Commander duties to CTF70, embarked in USS George Washington (CVN-73).

== Ships ==
The squadron consists of the following ships:

- USS Benfold (DDG-65)
- USS Milius (DDG-69)
- USS Preble (DDG-88)
- USS Howard (DDG-83)
- USS McCampbell (DDG-85)
- USS Dewey (DDG-105)
- USS John Finn (DDG-113)
- USS Ralph Johnson (DDG-114)
- USS Rafael Peralta (DDG-115)
- USS Higgins (DDG-76)

== Commodores ==
- CAPT T.T. Graven Dec 1921-Jul 1922
- CAPT J.C. Chirch Oct 1928-Jul 1930
- CAPT I.F. Dortch Jul 1930-Feb 1931
- CAPT C.C. Hartman Feb 1942-Dec 1943
- CAPT S.W. Dubois Dec 1943-Aug 1944
- CAPT E.R. Durgin Aug 1943-Nov 1944
- CAPT Smith-Hutton Nov 1944-Nov 1945
- CAPT M. Hubbard Jan 1946-Jun 1946
- CAPT F.H. Gardner Jun 1946-Aug 1947
- CAPT R.D. Smith Aug 1947-Aug 1948
- CAPT W.L. Dyer Aug 1948-Apr 1949
- CAPT H.J. Armstrong Jr. Aug 1950-Nov 1951
- CAPT M.M. Zemmer Nov 1951-Apr 1953
- CAPT B.J. Mullaney Oct 1953-May 1953
- CAPT L.B. Baldaue May 1955-Aug 1956
- CAPT F.A. McKee Aug 1956-Dec 1956
- CAPT R.P. Fiala Dec 1956-Feb 1958
- CAPT J.C. Nichols Feb 1958-Apr 1959
- CAPT J.H. Brown Apr 1959-May 1960
- CAPT B.A. Smith May 1960-Jul 1961
- CAPT J.M. Alford Jul 1961-Aug 1962
- CAPT L.F. Hubbell Aug 1962-Jul 1963
- CAPT J.P. Coleman Jul 1963-Jul 1964
- CAPT R.R. Crutchfield Jul 1964-Sep 1964
- CAPT S.T. Orme Sep 1964-Sep 1965
- CAPT W.M. Gantar Sep 1965-Aug 1966
- CAPT C.E. McMullen Aug 1966-Jul 1968
- CAPT L.D. Cummins Jul 1968-Jan 1970
- CAPT J.R. Collier Jan 1970-May 1971
- CAPT E.C. Kline May 1971-Feb 1973
- CAPT E.I. Finke Feb 1973-Mar 1975
- CAPT C.L. Bekkedahl Mar 1975-Oct 1976
- CAPT J.H. Berry Jr. Oct 1976-Dec 1978
- CAPT W.E. Olsen Dec 1978-Mar 1981
- CAPT P.J. Doerr Mar 1981-Feb 1983
- CAPT F.J. Barneds III Feb 1983-Aug 1985
- CAPT W.S. Johnson Sep 1985-Sep 1987
- CAPT R.J. Cepek Sep 1987-Aug 1989
- CAPT J.W. Parker Oct 1989-Aug 1991
- CAPT R.A. Robbins Aug 1991-Jul 1993
- CAPT E.H. Butt IV Jul 1993-Jun 1995
- CAPT R.E. Smith Jun 1995-May 1997
- CAPT J.F. Ferguson May 1997-Jun 1999
- CAPT J.W. Stevenson Jr. Jun 1999-Jan 2001
- CAPT D.W. Davenport Jan 2001-Jun 2001
- CAPT M.A. Mahon Jun 2001-Sep 2003
- RADM S. Perez Jr. Sep 2003-Jun 2005
- RADM R.P. Girrier Jun 2005-Feb 2007
- RADM M.C. Montgomery Apr 2007-Feb 2009
- RDML C.F. Williams Feb 2009-Jun 2010
- CAPT W.T. Wagner Jun 2010-June 2011
- CAPT J.L. Schultz Jun 2011-Dec 2012
- RDML P.J. Lyons Dec 2012-Apr 2014
- CAPT S.M. Byrne Apr 2014-Aug 2015
- RADM C.J. Sweeney Aug 2015-Sep 2016
- CAPT J.A. Bennett II Sep 2016-Sep 2017
- CAPT J.C. Duffy Sep 2017-Sep 2019
- CAPT S.H. DeMoss Sep 2019-Feb 2021
- RDML C.R. Sargeant Feb 2021-Aug 2022
- CAPT W.C. Mainor Aug 2022-Nov 2023
- CAPT J.L. Harts Nov 2023-Apr 2025
- CAPT D.A. Huljack Apr 2025-Aug 2026
- CAPT N.R. Gabriel Aug 2026-Present
