= Commander, Naval Surface Force Pacific =

Type Command for U.S. Naval surface forces operating primarily in the Pacific

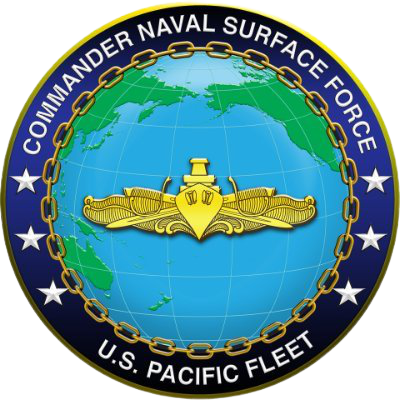
COMNAVSURFPAC logo

The Commander, Naval Surface Force Pacific (COMNAVSURFPAC) is the type commander for the Surface Force under the United States Pacific Fleet. The COMNAVSURFPAC is also the Commander, Naval Surface Forces (COMNAVSURFOR) and the Commander, Surface Warfare Enterprise. The position is typically held by a Vice-Admiral. From 1978 onwards, the headquarters has been located at Naval Amphibious Base Coronado, Coronado, California.

== History ==
The command was commissioned in March 1975. The first commander was Vice Admiral Robert Samuel Salzer. Under his command the consolidation of all Cruisers, Destroyers (previously under COMDESPAC), Frigates (in Cruiser-Destroyer Force, Pacific), Amphibious (ComPhibPac), Mine Force (previously including Mine Squadron 7, disestablished in 1968), Pacific Fleet, Service Force Ships, Tenders and Repair Ships (in Service Force, Pacific Fleet (ComServPac)), Naval Special Warfare Forces (SEALS), and Amphibious warfare schools of the Pacific Fleet, was commenced. On 7 June 1975 Vice Admiral Emmett H. Tidd assumed Command of the Naval Surface Force, US Pacific Fleet. During this period, the final consolidation took place. When the task of consolidating the Naval Surface Forces, Pacific Fleet was completed, Admiral Tidd requested retirement. After over 33 years of service, he was retired from the Navy in August 1976 with the permanent rank of vice admiral. On behalf of the President of the United States, he was awarded a Second Gold Star in lieu of the Third Award of the Distinguished Service Medal, "For exceptionally meritorious service ... ." At that time, the Naval Surface Force of the Pacific Fleet consisted of 183 ships and over 55,000 personnel.

In 1978, according to Ships and Aircraft of the U.S. Fleet, Eleventh Edition, the command comprised Cruiser-Destroyer Group 1 (with Destroyer Squadrons 5, 13, and 23), Cruiser-Destroyer Group 3 (Destroyer Squadron 7, Destroyer Squadrons 17 and 27), Cruiser-Destroyer Group 5 (Destroyer Squadrons 9, 21, 31, and 37 (NRF)), Surface Group Western Pacific at Naval Base Subic Bay, with Destroyer Squadron 15 subordinate but based at Yokosuka, Japan, Surface Group Middle Pacific in Hawaii with Destroyer Squadrons 25, 33, 35, and Service Squadron 5, Amphibious Group 1/Task Force 76 in Okinawa, Amphibious Group Eastern Pacific, with its headquarters and Amphibious Squadrons 1, 3, 5, and 7 all in San Diego, Naval Special Warfare Group 1, Mine Squadron 5 (NRF) with Mine Divisions 51, 52, 53, and 54 (all NRF), and Service Group 1 at Oakland, CA., with Service Squadrons 1 and 3 at San Diego and Vallejo, respectively.

By 1984, SurfPac had four destroyer tenders (ADs), one repair ship (AR), and one battleship (seemingly USS New Jersey (BB-62)) reporting directly to it, and Surface Squadron 1 had been established at Long Beach, CA. Surface Squadron 1 was a mix: it comprised one salvage ship (ARS), 3 ATF, 1 AVM, two frigates, 1 LKA, and 1 LST. Cruiser-Destroyer Groups 1, 3, 5 still directed multiple squadrons, though Service Group 1 had only a single subordinate squadron, Service Squadron 3 headquartered at Vallejo, comprising seven ammunition ships.

== List of commanders ==
- VADM Robert S. Salzer, March 1975 – June 1975
- VADM Emmett H. Tidd, June 1975 – July 1976
- VADM William R. St. George, July 1976 – May 1979
- VADM Lee Baggett Jr., May 1979 – July 1982
- VADM Harry C. Schrader Jr., July 1982 – July 1985
- VADM George W. Davis Jr., July 1985 – August 1988
- VADM Robert K. U. Kihune, August 1988 – December 1990
- VADM David M. Bennett, December 1990 – November 1992
- CAPT Wirt R. Fladd (Interim), November 1992 – April 1993
- VADM David B. Robinson, April 1993 – June 1996
- VADM Alexander J. Krekich, June 1996 – August 1998
- VADM Edward Moore Jr., August 1998 – May 2001
- VADM Timothy W. LaFleur, May 2001 – March 2005
- VADM Terrance T. Etnyre, March 2005 – February 2008
- RADM Kevin M. Quinn (Interim), February 2008 – March 2008
- VADM Derwood C. Curtis, March 2008 – June 2011
- VADM Richard W. Hunt, June 2011 - July 2012
- VADM Thomas H. Copeman III, July 2012 - August 2014
- VADM Thomas S. Rowden, August 2014 – January 2018
- VADM Richard A. Brown, January 2018 – August 2020
- VADM Roy I. Kitchener, August 2020 – August 2023
- RADM Yvette M. Davids, August 2023 – December 2023 (acting)
- VADM Brendan R. McLane, December 2023 – July 2026
- VADM Joseph F. Cahill, July 2026 – present

== Previous commanders, Amphibious Force, Pacific Fleet ==
The Amphibious Force was formerly known as commander, Amphibious Forces, Pacific Fleet (ComPhibPac). On 7 December 1941 the post was filled by Marine Major General William P. Upshur. Amphibious Forces, PacFlt comprised the Army's 3rd Infantry Division at Fort Lewis, under Army operational control, the 2nd Marine Division, the 2nd Marine Aircraft Wing, the 2nd Defense Battalion (see Marine defense battalions), and a depot. One of PhibPac's subordinate commands during World War II was Transports, Amphibious Force, Pacific Fleet, or TransPhibPac. The commander of TransPhibPac was known as ComTransPhibPac.

Vice Admiral Wilson Brown was appointed commander of the amphibious forces in the Pacific (ComPhibPac) on 10 April 1942.

On March 8, 1944, Vice Admiral Richmond K. Turner reported to the Commander-in-Chief U.S. Pacific Fleet, as Commander Amphibious Forces, U.S. Pacific Fleet. Vice Admiral Turner's orders as Commander FIFTH Amphibious Force, U.S. Pacific Fleet remained in force on his assumption of the higher command. On June 1, 1944, the Amphibious Forces, U.S. Pacific Fleet, were reconstituted by the Commander-in-Chief, U.S. Fleet and Vice Admiral Turner assigned additional duty as TYPE COMMANDER for all Amphibious Forces, U.S. Pacific Fleet.

The AMPHIBIOUS Forces, U.S. Pacific Fleet consisted of Transports-Assault (APA), Cargo Vessels-Assault (AKA), Transports (AP), Cargo Vessels (AK), Civilian Manned Transports (XAP), and Cargo Vessels (XAK), Landing Ship Vehicles (LSV), Landing Ship Docks (LSD), Landing Ship Tanks (LST), Patrol and Special Craft (PCS, SC, LCC), Landing Craft (LSM, LCI(L), LCI(G), LCT(6), LCT(5), APc), Landing Boats, Training Commands, and Amphibious Operating, Repair and Training bases. These Forces were designated TASK Force Thirteen.

Subordinate Commanders of the Amphibious Forces, U.S. Pacific Fleet are as follows:

- Commander Amphibious Group ONE, Amphibious Forces, U.S. Pacific Fleet
- Commander Amphibious Group TWO, Amphibious Forces, U.S. Pacific Fleet
- Commander Amphibious Group THREE, Amphibious Forces, U.S. Pacific Fleet
- Commander Amphibious Group FOUR, Amphibious Forces, U.S. Pacific Fleet
- Commander Amphibious Group FIVE, Amphibious Forces, U.S. Pacific Fleet
- Commander Amphibious Group SIX, Amphibious Forces, U.S. Pacific Fleet
- Commander Amphibious Group SEVEN, Amphibious Forces, U.S. Pacific Fleet
- Commander Amphibious Group TWELVE, Amphibious Forces, U.S. Pacific Fleet
- Commander Support Aircraft
- Commander, Training Command, Amphibious Forces, U.S. Pacific Fleet
- Commander, Administrative Command, Amphibious Forces, U.S. Pacific Fleet
- Transport Squadron Commanders
- Transport Division Commanders

The Commander Support Aircraft is placed by the Commander-in-Chief, U.S. Pacific Fleet, under the control of Commander Air Force, U.S. Pacific Fleet, for administration and training. When needed for operations and upon request by Commander Amphibious Forces, Commander Support Aircraft reports to Commander THIRD or FIFTH Amphibious Force for Operation Control. Office space is provided at Amphibious Force Headquarters.

This post was disestablished in 1975 and its functions were passed on to Naval Surface Force, US Pacific Fleet.

- 1948–1950: RADM Bertram J. Rodgers
- 1950–1950: RADM Peter K. Fischler
- 1950–1953: VADM Ingolf N. Kiland
- 1953–1954: VADM William M. Callaghan
- 1954–1956: VADM Thomas G. W. Settle
- 1956–1958: VADM Carl F. Espe
- 1958–1960: VADM John Sylvester
- 1960–1963: VADM Howard A. Yeager
- 1963–1964: VADM Ephraim P. Holmes
- 1964–1965: VADM John B. Colwell
- 1965–1966: VADM Bernard F. Roeder
- 1966–1968: VADM Francis J. Blouin
- 1968–1970: VADM John V. Smith
- 1970–1972: VADM Nels C. Johnson
- 1972–1975: VADM Robert S. Salzer
