= Commander, Naval Surface Force Atlantic =

Type Command for U.S. Naval surface forces operating primarily in the Atlantic

Naval Surface Force Atlantic (COMNAVSURFLANT)
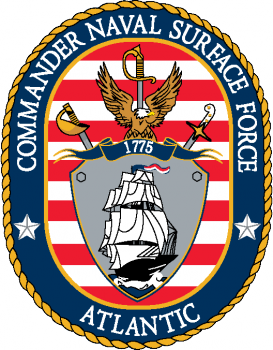
- Naval Surface Force Atlantic crest
- Active: 1 July 1975 to date.
- Country: United States of America
- Branch: United States Navy
- Type: U.S. Navy type commands
- Role: Administrative control over certain assets
- Part of: United States Fleet Forces Command
- Garrison/HQ: Naval Station Norfolk
- Website: Official Website

Commanders
- Commander: RADM Christopher D. Alexander, USN
- Deputy Commander: RDML Marc S. Lederer, USN
- Force Master Chief: FORCM Jon Lonsdale, USN

The Commander, Naval Surface Force, Atlantic (COMNAVSURFLANT) is the surface force type commander (TYCOM) under the United States Fleet Forces Command. As Naval Surface Force Atlantic, it is a military formation, and the organization is often known as SURFLANT. Its headquarters are at Naval Station Norfolk in Norfolk, Virginia. The current commander is Rear Admiral Christopher D. Alexander. COMNAVSURFLANT supervises all surface ships based on the Eastern United States and Gulf Coast of the United States, as well as ships forward deployed to Naval Station Rota, Spain.

== Overview ==
Naval Surface Force Atlantic is one of the U.S. Navy type commands. It consists of more than 70 ships, 25 separate organizations, and 25,000 personnel. The command was created on 1 July 1975 by the consolidation of the previous Commander, Amphibious Forces, Atlantic Fleet (COMPHIBLANT), Commander, Cruiser-Destroyer Forces, Atlantic Fleet (COMCRUDESLANT), Commander, Service Forces, Atlantic Fleet (COMSERVLANT), and Commander, Minesweeping Force, Atlantic Fleet.

The Destroyer Force, Atlantic Fleet, was established after the First World War. The Force was redesignated as Destroyer Squadron, Atlantic, on October 1, 1921; later to be redesignated again as Destroyer Squadron, Scouting Fleet, U.S. Fleet, on December 8, 1922. With the change in designations in the Fleet, the destroyers were established as Destroyer Squadron, Scouting Force, U.S. Fleet. From October 1, 1937, to July 3, 1940, units of this squadron were transferred continually to the Pacific Fleet. The outbreak of war in Europe reversed this trend.

On July 3, 1940, there were again enough destroyers in the Atlantic to establish a type command, which became known as Destroyers, Atlantic Squadron, U.S. Fleet. When in November 1940, the Atlantic Squadron became the Patrol Force; the destroyer command was renamed Destroyers, Patrol Force, U.S. Fleet. On February 3, 1941, with the reorganization of the Navy and the dissolution of the Patrol Force; the U.S. Atlantic Fleet formed and Destroyers, Atlantic Fleet came into being. On 1 April 1962, the Cruiser-Destroyer Force, Atlantic (CruDesLant), was formed by the merger of the former cruiser and destroyer type commands. USS Yosemite (AD-19), the former DesLant flagship, became the CruDesLant flagship. COMCRUDESLANT was originally headquartered at Naval Station Newport, RI, but transferred to Norfolk in the early 1970s.

Previously, Commander, Service Forces, Atlantic Fleet (COMSERVLANT), referred to both the U.S. Navy officer serving in that appointment which was extant from before World War II to 1975, and the command he headed, Service Forces, Atlantic Fleet (SERVLANT). He was the commander of all Atlantic Fleet "service"-type ships, such as oilers, tankers, ammunition ships, reefer ships, cargo ships, supply ships, repair ships, and the like. These ships were non-combatant and were intended only to support the warships as they required supplies. ComServLant was a very large organization during World War II, and its sub-units were termed Service Squadrons (ServRons). From the late 1970s more and more service ships were transferred to Military Sealift Command; for example USS Truckee (AO-147) was transferred to MSC in January 1980.

Amphibious Forces, Atlantic Fleet (PHIBLANT), came under the command of Rear Admiral Jerauld Wright on November 24, 1948. He held it until November 1, 1950. Based at the Norfolk Naval Station, Wright was responsible for three major subordinate commands, Amphibious Group 2, Amphibious Group 4 (commanded by Eugene B. Fluckey from October 1960 to November 1961) and the Naval Amphibious Base Little Creek. COMPHIBLANT also included Amphibious Training, an Amphibious Air Control Group, a Naval Beach Group, a Detached Group, and a Mediterranean Group. Wright's flagship was the USS Taconic (AGC-17), an Adirondack-class amphibious force command ship. The most significant accomplishment during Wright's tour of duty as COMPHIBLANT was PORTREX, a multi-service amphibious assault exercise held from February 25 to March 11, 1950. PORTREX was the largest peacetime amphibious exercise up to that time and it was staged to evaluate joint doctrine for combined operations, test new equipment under simulated combat conditions and provide training for the defense of the Caribbean. Amphibious Group 4 later took part in operations in the Dominican Republic in 1965.

In April 1994, Commander, Destroyer Squadron 6 (COMDESRON 6) changed homeport to Pascagoula, Mississippi and subsequently was dual hatted as Commander, Naval Surface Group Pascagoula. In January 1996, as a result of an Atlantic Fleet reorganization, Commander, Naval Surface Group Pascagoula was renamed Commander, Regional Support Group Pascagoula.

As part of a reorganization announced in July 1995 of the U.S. Atlantic Fleet's surface combatant ships into six core battle groups, nine destroyer squadrons, and a new Western Hemisphere Group, USS John Hancock (DD-981) was reassigned to Destroyer Squadron 24. The re-organization was to be phased in over the summer and take effect 31 August 1995, with homeport shifts occurring through 1998.

At the end of the transitional period, the following ship assignments were to apply:

- Destroyer Squadron 2: USS Arleigh Burke (DDG-51), USS Deyo (DD-989), USS Stump (DD-978), and USS Kauffman (FFG-59).
- Destroyer Squadron 14: USS John Rodgers (DD-983), USS O'Bannon (DD-987), USS Underwood (FFG-36), and USS Carney (DDG-64) in FY96.
- Destroyer Squadron 18: USS Stout (DDG-55), USS Nicholson (DD-982), USS Thorn (DD-988), and USS Nicholas (FFG-47).
- Destroyer Squadron 20: USS Briscoe (DD-977), USS Klakring (FFG-42), USS Robert G. Bradley (FFG-49) until transfer to Western Hemisphere Group in August 1997, and USS Gonzalez (DDG-66) in FY96.
- Destroyer Squadron 22: USS Laboon (DDG-58), USS Caron (DD-970), USS Simpson (FFG-56), and USS Cole (DDG-67) in FY96.
- Destroyer Squadron 24: USS Spruance (DD-963), USS John Hancock (DD-981), USS Taylor (FFG-50), and USS The Sullivans (DDG-68) in FY97.
- Destroyer Squadron 26: USS Barry (DDG-52), USS Arthur W. Radford (DD-968), USS Comte de Grasse (DD-974) and USS Samuel B. Roberts (FFG-58).
- Destroyer Squadron 28: USS Mitscher (DDG-57), USS Peterson (DD-969), USS Elrod (FFG-55), USS Halyburton (FFG-40), and USS Ross (DDG-71) in FY97.
- Destroyer Squadron 32: USS Ramage (DDG-61), USS Hayler USS Hayler (DD-997), USS Hawes (FFG-53), and USS Carr (FFG-52).

Western Hemisphere Group (WESTHEMGRU) was established in September 1995 and eventually supervised Destroyer Squadron 6 and Destroyer Squadron 14 as well as a Coast Guard squadron.(FAS.org, GlobalSecurity.org) It was intended to build expertise on the Caribbean and Central/South America. In April 1998, as the result of yet another reorganization, COMDESRON 6 shifted operational control to Commander, Western Hemisphere Group, and was redesignated as a Tactical Squadron. Around 1998, the squadron included Hall, Ticonderoga, and Yorktown. In December 1999, COMDESRON 6 was redesignated as a Tactical/Readiness Squadron under the operational control of Commander, Naval Surface Group 2. At one point, the composition of Destroyer Squadron 6 included FFG-16 at Mayport, FFG-22 at Charleston, SC, USS Samuel Eliot Morison (FFG-13) at Charleston, SC, FFG 15 at Norfolk, and FFG 20 and FFG 21 at Pascagoula.

Commander Naval Surface Group Two was established 18 February 2000 and Western Hemisphere Group was disestablished the same day.

Effective 1 October 2001, the U.S. Navy designated a "Lead-Follow" arrangement among its type commands wherein one type commander was designated the senior lead for the specific "type" of weapon system (i.e., naval aviation, submarine warfare, surface warships) throughout the entire operating U.S. Fleet as it pertains to modernization needs, training initiatives, and operational concept development. From that date, these designated fleet TYCOM commanders were to provide guidance to their respective "type" forces via the lead-follow TYCOM arrangement.

The Commander, Naval Surface Force, U.S. Pacific Fleet (COMNAVSURFPAC) was designated as the Commander, Naval Surface Forces (COMNAVSURFOR) for the U.S. Fleet Forces Command, with the Commander, Naval Surface Force Atlantic (COMNAVSURFLANT), serving as his deputy. COMNAVSURFOR is responsible for modernization needs, training initiatives, and operational concept development for the surface warfare community throughout the U.S. Navy's operational fleet. It appears that as a result, the COMNAVSURFLANT post was lowered to a Rear Admiral's post instead of the previous Vice Admiral.

== Force composition in 2010 ==
- Carrier Strike Groups
  - Carrier Strike Group Two
  - Carrier Strike Group Eight
  - Carrier Strike Group Ten
  - Carrier Strike Group Twelve
- Destroyer Squadrons
  - Destroyer Squadron 2
  - Destroyer Squadron 14
  - Destroyer Squadron 22
  - Destroyer Squadron 26
  - Destroyer Squadron 28
- Expeditionary Strike Group 2
  - Amphibious Squadron 6
  - Amphibious Squadron 8
  - Fleet Surgical Team Two (FST-2)
  - Fleet Surgical Team Four (FST-4)
  - Fleet Surgical Team Six (FST-6)
  - Fleet Surgical Team Eight (FST-8)
- Naval Beach Group Two
  - Assault Craft Unit Two (ACU-2)
  - Assault Craft Unit Four (ACU-4)
  - Beachmaster Unit Two (BMU-2)
- Patrol Craft
  - Patrol Craft Crew Alpha
  - Patrol Craft Crew Bravo
  - Patrol Craft Crew Charlie
  - Patrol Craft Crew Delta
  - Patrol Craft Crew Echo
  - Patrol Craft Crew Foxtrot
  - Patrol Craft Crew Golf
  - Patrol Craft Crew Hotel
  - Patrol Craft Crew India
  - Patrol Craft Crew Juliet
  - Patrol Craft Crew Kilo
  - Patrol Craft Crew Lima
  - Patrol Craft Crew Mike
- Support Facilities and Activities
  - Naval Surface Group Middle Atlantic
  - Mid-Atlantic Regional Maintenance Center
  - South Central Regional Maintenance Center
  - Southeast Regional Maintenance Center
  - Commander Strike Force Training Atlantic
  - Surface Warfare Development Group
- Afloat Training Group, Atlantic
  - Afloat Training Group Ingleside
  - Afloat Training Group Mayport
