= Destroyer Squadron 7 =

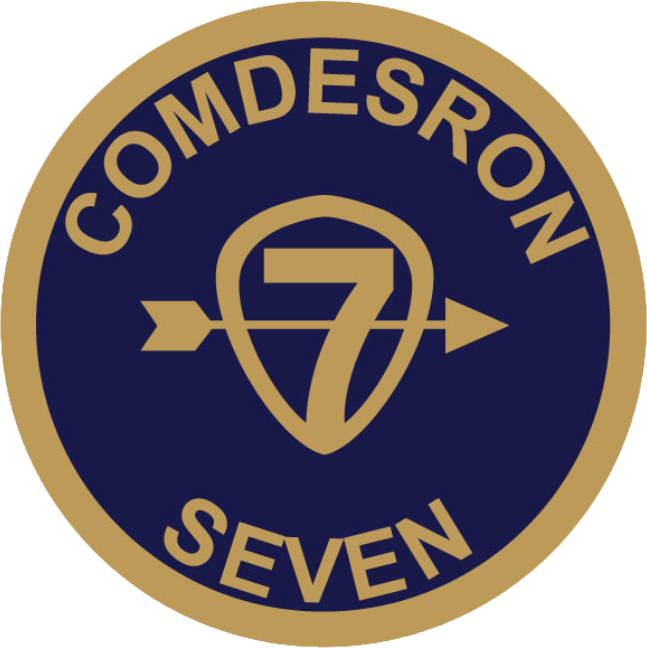
- Active: 1920–22, 1939–45, 1946–present
- Country: United States
- Branch: United States Navy
- Type: destroyer squadron
- Role: Naval surface/strike/anti-aircraft warfare
- Part of: Task Force 76, Expeditionary Strike Group 3, United States Seventh Fleet
- Engagements: Neutrality Patrol; World War II; Operation Husky; Operation Avalanche; Operation Shingle; Operation Dragoon; Korean War; Operation Chromite; Vietnam War; Operation Desert Storm; Operation Enduring Freedom; Operation Iraqi Freedom; Operation Enduring Freedom – Afghanistan; Operation New Dawn

Commanders
- Commodore: Captain Sean Lewis, USN
- Notable commanders: James L. Kauffman, Fred Kacher

Destroyer Squadron 7 (DesRon 7) is a naval unit of the United States Navy stationed in Singapore. It is assigned to the United States Seventh Fleet.

== Command history ==
=== 1920-1922 ===
Destroyer Squadron 7 (DesRon 7) was first established in September 1920 as a reserve squadron of 15 destroyers homeported at Charleston, South Carolina (USA). The squadron was deactivated in July 1922.

=== 1939-1945 ===
In April 1939, DesRon 7 was reactivated at Naval Base San Diego, California. In December 1940, the squadron was reformed at Naval Station Newport, Rhode Island. It was equipped with newly built Benson- and Gleaves-class destroyers between June and September 1940. In December 1940, DesRon 7 consisted of the Destroyer Divisions (DesDiv) 13 and 14 with the following ships:

- USS Plunkett (DD-431), flag
- Destroyer Division 13
  - USS Benson (DD-421)
  - USS Mayo (DD-422)
  - USS Gleaves (DD-423)
  - USS Niblack (DD-424), flag
- Destroyer Division 14
  - USS Madison (DD-425)
  - USS Lansdale (DD-426)
  - USS Hilary P. Jones (DD-427)
  - USS Charles F. Hughes (DD-428), flag

Between March and December 1941, DesRon 7 operated 31 in the "Atlantic Convoy Support Force" from Argentia, Newfoundland and Iceland with the Wickes- and Clemson-class destroyers of DesRon 30 and DesRon 31. During these “short-of-war” operations, Niblack fired the first U.S. depth charges of the war on 10 April 1941 (on the German submarine U-52), while rescuing survivors the Dutch cargo ship Saleier. On 31 October, Niblack and Hilary P. Jones rescued 45 survivors of USS Reuben James (DD-245) which was sunk by a torpedo attack from German submarine U-552 near Iceland on 31 October 1941. On 3 September 1942, while escorting Convoy TA-18, bound for New York City, a large fire broke out aboard the troop transport USS Wakefield (AP-21). Mayo and the light cruiser USS Brooklyn (CL-40) closed to windward to take off passengers, a badly-burned officer, and members of the crew not needed to man pumps and hoses. Other survivors were disembarked by boat and raft, to be picked up forthwith by the screening ships, among them Niblack and Hilary P. Jones. DesRon 7 continued to serve in the Atlantic Ocean until the Allied invasion of Sicily in August 1943, when Plunkett and Gleaves accepted the surrender of the small island of Ustica in the Tyrrhenian Sea.

The following month, Plunkett and the ships of DesDiv 13 operated in the screen of the Southern Attack Force during the Allied invasion of Italy. On 9 October 1943, Gleaves and a British LCT rescued 57 survivors of USS Buck (DD-420) which had been sunk by the German submarine U-616 off the coast of Salerno when it was working in support of Operation Avalanche. DesDiv13 (less Benson) operated with the multinational Task Force 81 in “Operation Shingle,” the landings at Anzio, in January 1944. While providing fire support, Mayo succeeded in breaking up a German counterattack 23 January, before she was heavily damaged by a mine the following day. Plunkett suffered major damage from a bomb hit on the same day. On 20 April 1944, Lansdale was torpedoed and sunk by German bombers off the coast of Algeria while escorting Convoy UGS-37. Gleaves and Hilary P. Jones sank the German submarine U-616 with other ships and aircraft off Spain on 17 May 1944. Afterwards they rescued 53 members of her crew. Niblack and Ludlow sank the German submarine U-960 north-west of Algiers with gunfire on 19 May 1944.

In August and September 1944, DesDiv 13 participated Operation Dragoon, the invasion of Southern France. Hilary P. Jones provided gunfire support missions during the assault, but also acted as electronic jamming vessel in the successful attempt to prevent radio-controlled bombs from harassing the area. In the weeks that followed she continued to range up and down the coast in support of the First Airborne Task Force destroying bridges, gun emplacements, railroad facilities and coastal vessels. She was attacked by a German E-boat 21 August, but destroyed the craft with gunfire. For her outstanding record during this period the ship received the Navy Unit Commendation.

Convoy duty and overhauls followed these actions. In the spring of 1945, DesRon 7 was transferred to the Pacific Ocean, where it was mainly engaged in escort duties. Benson, Mayo, Madison and Hilary P. Jones entered Tokyo Bay on 2 September 1945 during the surrender ceremony. Returning to the United States, DesRon 7 was deactivated in November 1945.

=== 1946 - present ===
In January 1946, DesRon 60 was redesignated DesRon 7. Ships of the squadron participated in Operation Crossroads, the atomic bomb tests at Bikini Atoll. The squadron saw extended action during the Korean War, including the Battle of Inchon. During the Vietnam War, the squadron was deployed in support of Operation Market Time and engaged in shore bombardments.

In January and February 1979, DesRon 7 participated in the evacuation of Americans from Iran during the Iranian Revolution. During the 1991 Gulf War, the commander of DesRon 7 acted as the "North Arabian Gulf Local Anti-Surface Warfare Commander" and directed multi-national forces in offensive operations which eliminated the Iraqi Navy.

In 1994-2003, DesRon 7 was assigned the battle group of the aircraft carrier USS Constellation (CV-64). In 1992, 1994, 1997 and 1999, DesRon 7 participated in Operation Southern Watch in the Arabian Gulf.

In 2002, the following ships were assigned to DesRon 7:

- USS Valley Forge (CG-50)
- USS Bunker Hill (CG-52)
- USS John Paul Jones (DDG-53)
- USS Benfold (DDG-65)
- USS Milius (DDG-69)
- USS Higgins (DDG-76)
- USS Howard (DDG-83)
- USS Kinkaid (DD-965)
- USS Thach (FFG-43)

From 2004 to 2012, DesRon 7 was assigned to the battle group of the newly commissioned aircraft carrier USS Ronald Reagan (CVN-76).

In December 2012, DesRon 7 shifted its homeport to Singapore where it acts as the tactical commander of littoral combat ships rotationally deployed to Southeast Asia. It also leads the execution of the CARAT exercises. Exercise CARAT is a series of annual bilateral military exercises conducted by the United States Pacific Fleet with several member nations in Southeast Asia since 1995.
