= Destroyer Squadron 14 =

Commander Naval Surface Group Southeast
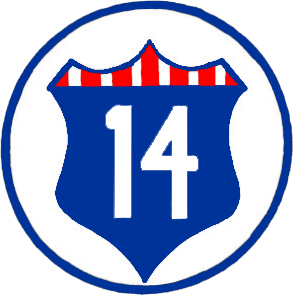
- Founded: 1920–1931, 1942–1945, 1946–present
- Country: United States
- Branch: United States Navy
- Type: Squadron
- Role: Naval air/surface warfare
- Garrison/HQ: Naval Station Mayport, Florida

Destroyer Squadron 14, now Commander Naval Surface Group Southeast (CNSG-SE), is the administrative Immediate Superior in Command (ISIC) for all Guided-missile destroyer that are homeported at Naval Station Mayport in Jacksonville, Florida.

CNSG-SE was established on 07 November 2023, and was previously CNSS-14 since 31 July 2015 by the merging of Destroyer Squadron Fourteen and Cruiser Destroyer Readiness Support Detachment Mayport. CNSG-SE's roots thus go back to the establishment of the original DESRON Fourteen in 1920.
