= Momsen =

Momsen is a surname. Notable people with the surname include:

- Bob Momsen (1929–2010), American football player
- Charles Momsen (1896–1967), American pioneer in submarine rescue for the United States Navy
- Hans Momsen (1735–1811), North Frisian farmer, mathematician and astronomer
- Johan Momsen (born 1995), South African rugby union player
- Richard Paul Momsen (1891–1965), American/Brazilian lawyer, US Consul General in Rio de Janeiro
- Taylor Momsen (born 1993), American actress, musician and model
- Tony Momsen (1928–1994), American football center in the National Football League

== See also ==
- Momsen lung, primitive underwater rebreather used before and during World War II by American submariners as emergency escape gear
- USS Momsen, an Arleigh Burke-class destroyer in the United States Navy
- Mom Song (disambiguation)
- Mommsen
- Monson (surname), another surname
