= Carrier Strike Group 11 =

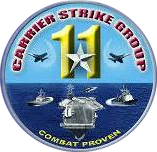
- Carrier Strike Group 11 crest
- Active: 1 October 2004 to date.
- Country: United States of America
- Branch: United States Navy
- Type: Carrier Strike Group
- Role: Naval air/surface warfare
- Part of: U.S. Third Fleet
- Garrison/HQ: Naval Station Everett, Washington
- Nickname: Nimitz Carrier Strike Group
- Motto: Combat Proven
- Engagements: Operation Enduring Freedom; Operation Iraqi Freedom; War in Afghanistan (2001–2021); Operation Enduring Freedom – Horn of Africa (OEF-HOA)
- Decorations: Navy Unit Commendation (2005) Meritorious Unit Commendation (2009)
- Website: Official Website

Commanders
- Commander: RADM Cassidy Norman
- Command Master Chief: CMDCM Jimmy McGill

Aircraft flown
- Electronic warfare: EA-18G Growler
- Fighter: F/A-18E/F Super Hornet
- Helicopter: MH-60R Seahawk; MH-60S Knighthawk
- Reconnaissance: E-2C Hawkeye
- Transport: CMV-22B Osprey

Carrier Strike Group 11 (CSG-11 or CARSTRKGRU 11) is a U.S. Navy carrier strike group. The aircraft carrier USS Nimitz (CVN-68) is the strike group's current flagship. Other units currently assigned to the group include the cruiser USS Princeton (CG-59) and Destroyer Squadron 9.

Between 2006 and 2013, the group made four deployments to the U.S. Fifth Fleet operating in the Persian Gulf and North Arabian Sea, as well as a surge deployment with the U.S. Seventh Fleet in the western Pacific Ocean. The group participated in bilateral exercises Malabar 2005 and Malabar 2005, Key Resolve/Foal Eagle 2008, as well as joint exercise Valiant Shield 2007.

== Historical background ==
On 1 September 1961, Rear Admiral Joseph C. Wylie became Commander Cruiser-Destroyer Flotilla 9, aboard USS Oklahoma City (CLG-5). Admiral Wylie had arrived on board the Oklahoma City as Commander Cruiser Division 3 on 22 August 1961, and merely changed titles in September without shifting flagship. As of 1 July 1969, Oklahoma City was part of Cruiser-Destroyer Flotilla 9 at San Diego. The primary mission of Cruiser-Destroyer Flotilla 9 during the Vietnam War era had been to ensure the effective employment of approximately 60 cruisers and destroyers in the United States Seventh Fleet. By January 1973, with the end of hostilities in Vietnam, the flotilla had expended nearly 80,000 rounds in naval gunfire support missions. This offshore firepower, and the equally important role of search and rescue coordination, were vital parts of the extensive naval presence in the South China Sea. In 1973, a major reorganization of the U.S. Navy's cruiser-destroyer force resulted in Cruiser-Destroyer Flotilla 9's re-designation as Cruiser Destroyer Group 5 (CDG-5).

Rear Admiral Gerald E. Thomas served as Commander Cruiser-Destroyer Group 5 in 1974–76. Then Captain Leon A. Edney served as Chief of Staff to the Commander Cruiser-Destroyer Group 5 after 1976. In 1978 Cruiser-Destroyer Group 5 consisted of Destroyer Squadron 9, Destroyer Squadron 21, Destroyer Squadron 31, and Destroyer Squadron 37 (Naval Reserve Force). The headquarters and the three active squadrons were at San Diego while Destroyer Squadron 37 was at Seattle, WA.

In the middle of 1992, the U.S. Navy instituted a concept that aimed to group its escorts into a more permanent carrier battle group structure. Instead of routinely changing the cruisers, destroyers, and frigates assigned to each carrier battle group, an attempt was made to permanently affiliate certain escorts with the carriers they escorted. Each of the Navy's 12 existing carrier battle groups was planned to consist of an aircraft carrier, an embarked carrier air wing, cruiser, destroyer, and frigate units, and two nuclear-powered attack submarines. Cruiser-Destroyer Group Five's units following the reorganization were as listed below.

Cruiser-Destroyer Group Five, late 1992

Guided-Missile Cruisers	Destroyer Squadron 17	Carrier Air Wing 15 squadrons embarked aboard USS Kitty Hawk (CV-63)	
USS Cowpens (CG-63)	USS Merrill (DD-976)	Fighter Squadron 111: F-14A	Airborne Early Warning Squadron 114: E-2C
USS Chancellorsville (CG-62)	USS Elliot (DD-967)	Fighter Squadron 51: F-14A	Sea Control Squadron 37: S-3B
USS William H. Standley (CG-32)	USS Crommelin (FFG-37)	Strike Fighter Squadron 97: F/A-18A	Helicopter Anti-Submarine Squadron 4: SH-60F, HH-60H
USS Leahy (CG-16)	USS Jarrett (FFG-33)	Strike Fighter Squadron 27: F/A-18A	——
——		Attack Squadron 52: A-6E SWIP, KA-6D	——
——		Electronic Warfare Squadron 134: EA-6B	——

On 1 August 1992, USS Kitty Hawk (CV-63) was appointed as Commander, Naval Air Force Pacific's "ready carrier." The ship embarked Commander, Cruiser-Destroyer Group 5; Commander, Destroyer Squadron 17 and Carrier Air Wing 15 for three months of work-ups before deploying to the Western Pacific on 3 November 1992. While on deployment, Kitty Hawk spent nine days off the coast of Somalia supporting U.S. Marines and coalition forces involved in Operation Restore Hope. In response to increasing Iraqi violations of United Nations sanctions, the ship rushed to the Persian Gulf on 27 December 1992. Seventeen days later, Kitty Hawk led a joint, coalition offensive strike against targets in southern Iraq.

On 15 July 1998, Rear Admiral Daniel R. Bowler (and his relief RADM Peter W. Marzluff), Commander, Cruiser-Destroyer Group 5, assumed operational control of Nimitz. Kitty Hawk had left the group by shifting her homeport to Yokosuka, Japan, arriving there on 11 August 1998.

In July 2000, USS Mobile Bay (CG-53) was transferred to Cruiser-Destroyer Group 5 (up to June 2000 it had been part of Carrier Group 5). From 21 September 2001 to 13 December 2001, following an overhaul, Nimitz sailed round Cape Horn to her new home port of NAS North Island. Commander, Cruiser-Destroyer Group 5 and CVWR-20, the latter comprising VFA-204, VAW-78, VS-22, VRC-30, HC-11 and HS-75, were aboard. Carrier Air Wing Eleven was reassigned to Cruiser-Destroyer Group Five and the Nimitz in January 2002. Rear Admiral Samuel J. Locklear took command of CCDG-5/Nimitz Carrier Strike Group in 2002, deploying to the Middle East in 2003.

On 1 October 2004, Cruiser Destroyer Group 5 was re-designated Carrier Strike Group 11.

== Command structure ==
The Carrier Strike Group commander exercises oversight of unit-level training, integrated training, and readiness for assigned ships and units, as well as maintains administrative functions and material readiness tracking for ships and squadrons assigned to the strike group. The group's pre-deployment Composite Training Unit Exercise comes under the operational control of the U.S. Third Fleet. When deployed, the group comes under command of the numbered fleet in whose area it is operating (Fourth, Fifth, Sixth, or Seventh). When deployed in this fashion, the group utilizes a task group designator, for example, Task Group 50.1 in the Fifth Fleet area. Guided-missile cruisers such as Princeton provide air defence during deployments.

Group commanders since October 2002 have included:

- Rear Admiral Samuel J. Locklear III (October 2002 – February 2004)
- Rear Admiral Derwood C. Curtis (February 2004 – February 2005)
- Rear Admiral Peter H. Daly (February 2005 – August 2006)
- Rear Admiral John T. Blake (August 2006 – March 2008)
- Rear Admiral John W. Miller (September 2008 – March 2010)
- Rear Admiral Robert P. Girrier (March 2010 – March 2011)
- Rear Admiral Thomas S. Rowden (March 2011 – November 2011)
- Rear Admiral Peter A. Gumataotao (November 2011 – February 2013)
- Rear Admiral Michael S. White (February 2013 – February 2014)
- Rear Admiral (lower half) Dee L. Mewbourne (February 2014 – July 2015)
- Rear Admiral (lower half) Richard A. Brown (July 2015 – September 2016)
- Rear Admiral (lower half) William D. Byrne Jr. (September 2016 – October 2017)
- Rear Admiral (lower half) Gregory N. Harris (October 2017 – June 2018)
- Rear Admiral (lower half) Donald D. Gabrielson (June 2018 – May 2019)
- Rear Admiral (lower half) Yvette M. Davids (May 2019 – May 2020)
- Rear Admiral (lower half) James A. Kirk (May 2020 – April 2021)
- Rear Admiral Christopher Sweeney (April 2021 – June 2023)
- Rear Admiral Jennifer S Couture (June 2023 – May 2024)
- Rear Admiral Maximilian Clark (May 2024 – May 2025)
- Rear Admiral Fred Goldhammer (May 2025 – March 2026)
- Rear Admiral Cassidy Norman (March 2026 – Present)

== Operational history ==
=== 2005 deployment ===
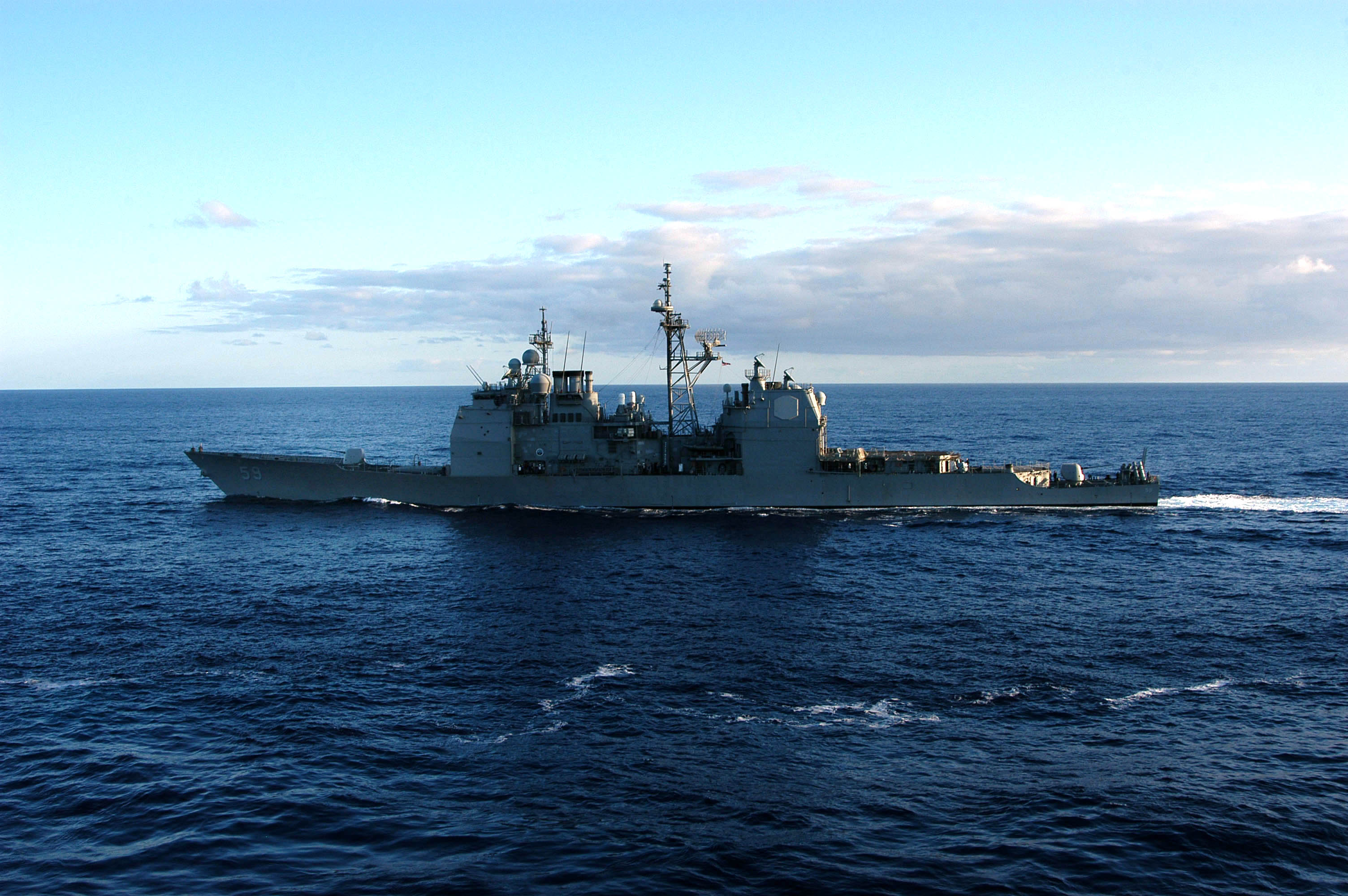
USS Princeton

From 11 to 24 March 2005, the group conducted a pre-deployment Joint Task Force exercise off California. The group departed San Diego, California, on 7 May 2005 under the command of Rear Admiral Peter Daly.

On 21 July 2005 in the Persian Gulf, USS Princeton (pictured) responded to a radio call from the Iranian dhow Hamid which needed engineering assistance. A team was dispatched to the Hamid where it was determined that the engine problem was due to corroded batteries that were low on power. The batteries were removed and brought back to Princeton for maintenance, cleaning, and recharging. Princeton was able to restore the power on board Hamid, restart the engines, and then provided medical assistance and fresh water.

On 22 September 2005, the group departed the Persian Gulf, after completing nine weeks of operations with the U.S. Fifth Fleet. During this period, 4,500 sorties totaling over 11,000 flight hours were flown by Carrier Air Wing Eleven, including over 1,100 sorties and 6,000 flight hours bombing Iraq War targets. The group returned home on 8 November 2005.

2005 deployment force composition

CARSTRKGRU 11 Warships	Carrier Air Wing Eleven (CVW-11) squadrons embarked aboard flagship USS Nimitz (CVN-68)	
USS Princeton (CG-59)	Marine Fighter Attack Squadron 232 (VMFA-232): 10 F/A-18C(N)	Carrier Airborne Early Warning Squadron 117 (VAW-117): 4 E-2C 2000 NP
USS Chafee (DDG-90)	Strike Fighter Squadron 94 (VFA-94): 10 F/A-18C(N)	Helicopter Anti-Submarine Squadron 6 (HS-6): 2 HH-60S and 4 SH-60S
USS Higgins (DDG-76)	Strike Fighter Squadron 41 (VFA-41): 12 F/A-18F	Fleet Logistics Support Squadron 40 (VRC-40), Det. 3: 2 C-2A
USS Louisville (SSN-724)	Strike Fighter Squadron 14 (VFA-14): 12 FA-18E	——
USNS Bridge (T-AOE 10)	Tactical Electronics Warfare Squadron 135 (VAQ-135): 4 EA-6B	——

2005 deployment exercises and port visits

Number	Exercises				Port Visits		Notes
Number	Duration	U.S. Force	Type	Operating Area	Location	Dates	Notes
1st:	——	Carrier Strike Group 11	——	——	Hong Kong	3–7 Jun. 2005	
2nd:	——	Carrier Strike Group 11	——	——	Guam	17 Jun. 2005	
3rd:	18–22 Jun. 2005	Carrier Strike Group 11	PASSEX: JMSDF (Note: Destroyers Akebono (DD-108), Makinami (DD-112) and Myōkō (DDG-175).)	Western Pacific	Port Kelang, Malaysia	30 Jun. – 4 Jul. 2005	
4th:	——	Carrier Strike Group 11	——	——	Bahrain	6–9 Aug. 2005	
5th:	——	Carrier Strike Group 11	——	——	Dubai	1–6 Sep. 2005	
6th:	27 Sep. – 5 Oct. 2005	Carrier Strike Group 11	Malabar 05: Indian Navy	Indian Ocean	Fremantle, Australia	7–12 Oct. 2005	

=== 2007 deployment ===
The group left San Diego on 2 April 2007 under the command of Rear Admiral John Blake. The group entered the U.S. Fifth Fleet area on 8 May 2007 and began conducting missions over Afghanistan three days later. The group joined Carrier Strike Group Three, led by the John C. Stennis, and relieved Carrier Strike Group Eight, led by the Dwight D. Eisenhower, that was currently operating in the Persian Gulf. The arrival of the strike group ensured the maintenance of the then two-U.S. carrier presence in the region.

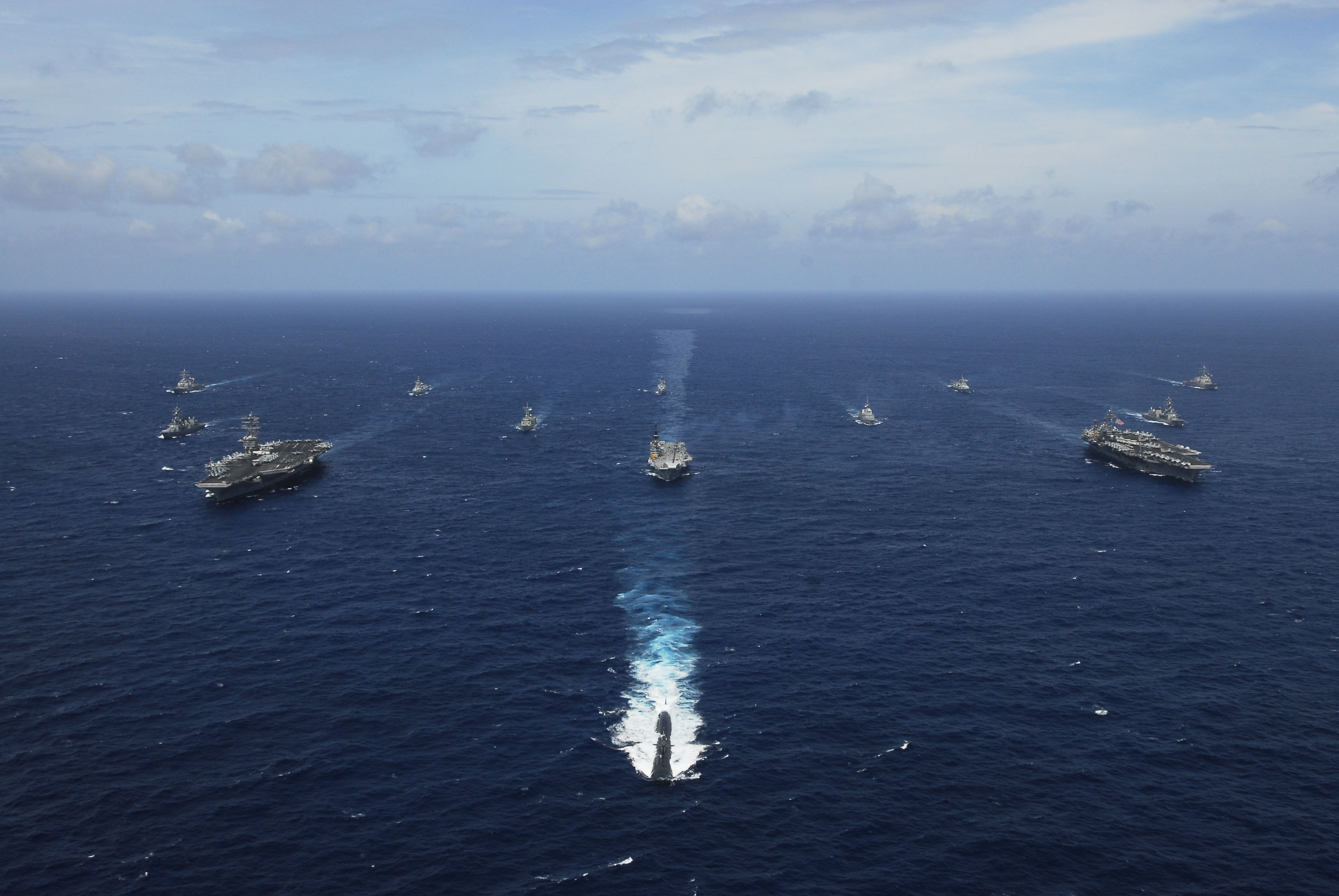
Malabar 07-2 (5 September 2007)

Nimitz's escorts conducted maritime security operations. Higgins boarded ships of interest in the Persian Gulf, as well as informing three Iraqi dhows on coalition aims and objectives. The VBSS teams boarded three Iraqi tugs and four super-tankers, thereby safeguarding the merchants in the region by deterring piracy and smuggling. Higgins was the only ship in the strike group to conduct a boarding of a tanker suspected of oil smuggling. After a thorough six-hour boarding, the VBSS team was able to clear the tanker.

The guided-missile destroyer Pinckney participated in a Cooperation Afloat Readiness and Training exercise with the Republic of Singapore Navy and three other U.S. Navy ships. The ships conducted air defense, anti-surface warfare, anti-submarine warfare, and VBSS operations in the compressed waters of the South China Sea, validating current tactics, techniques and procedures and identifying areas for further development.

Carrier Strike Group 11 joined Carrier Strike Group 5 and Carrier Strike Group 3 to participate in Exercise Valiant Shield 2007, a joint U.S. exercise held off Guam. Carrier Strike Group 11 subsequently joined the Carrier Strike Group Five and India's aircraft carrier Viraat in the Bay of Bengal for the multilateral Exercise Malabar 07-2 (pictured), an annual naval exercise involving India, Australia, Japan, and Singapore. The group arrived back at San Diego on 30 September 2007.

2007 deployment force composition

CARSTRKGRU 11 Warships/Units	Carrier Air Wing Eleven (CVW-11) squadrons embarked aboard flagship USS Nimitz (CVN-68)	
USS Princeton (CG-59)	Marine Fighter Attack Squadron 232 (VMFA-232): 12 FA-18C(N)	Carrier Airborne Early Warning Squadron 117 (VAW-117): 4 E-2C 2000 NP
USS Chafee (DDG-90)	Strike Fighter Squadron 81 (VFA-81): 12 FA-18C(N)	Helicopter Anti-Submarine Squadron 6 (HS-6): 2 HH-60S and 4 SH-60S
USS Higgins (DDG-76)	Strike Fighter Squadron 41 (VFA-41): 12 FA-18F	Fleet Logistics Support Squadron 40 (VRC-40), Det. 3: 4 C-2A
USS John Paul Jones (DDG-53)	Strike Fighter Squadron 14 (VFA-14): 12 FA-18E	Anti-Submarine Squadron Light 49 (HLS-49) detachments (2)
EOD Unit 11, Det. 15	Tactical Electronics Warfare Squadron 135 (VAQ-135): 4 EA-6B	——

2007 deployment exercises and port visits

Number	Regional Exercises				Port Visits		Notes
Number	Duration	U.S. Force	Bilateral/Multilateral Partner(s)	Operating Area	Location	Dates	Notes
1st:	——	Chafee	——	——	Apra Harbor, Guam	21 Apr. 2007	
2nd:	10 Jun. – 3 Jul.	John Paul Jones	Talisman Sabre 2007: Australian Defence Force	Coral Sea	Brisbane, Australia	10 Jun. 2007	
3rd:	25 Jun. – 2 Jul. 2007	Higgins	Nautical Union 2007: Saudi Arabia	Persian Gulf	——	——	
4th:	——	Nimitz, Pinckney	——	——	Chennai, India	2 Jul. 2007	
5th	17–31 Jul. 2007	Pinckney	CARAT 2007: Republic of Singapore Navy	Singapore Strait	Singapore	13 Jul. 2007	
6th:	7–14 Aug. 2007	Carrier Strike Group 11	Valiant Shield 2007: U.S. Pacific Command	Guam operating area	——	——	
7th:	——	Nimitz	——	——	Hong Kong	20–24 Aug. 2007	
8th:	4–10 Sep. 2007	Carrier Strike Group 11	Exercise Malabar 2007: India, Australia, Japan, and Singapore	Bay of Bengal	Singapore	5 Sep. 2007	
9th:	——	Nimitz	——	——	Pearl Harbor	22–24 Sep. 2007	

=== 2008 deployment ===
Carrier Strike Group 11 departed from San Diego on 24 January 2008. It was announced that the group would operate in the Western Pacific while the forward-based USS Kitty Hawk of Carrier Strike Group Eight underwent scheduled maintenance in Yokosuka, Japan. The strike group entered the U.S. Seventh Fleet area of responsibility on 8 February 2008. On 9 February 2008, two Russian Tu-95 'Bear' bombers were detected by the strike group in the Western Pacific. Four F/A-18C Hornets intercepted the bombers 50 miles (80 km) south of Nimitz. Two F/A-18s trailed one of the bombers, which buzzed the deck of the carrier twice, while the other two F/A-18s trailed another Tu-95 circling about 50 miles (80 km) away from the carrier. Reportedly, there was no radio communication between the American and Russian aircraft. According to the Department of Defense, one of the two aircraft was said to have flown above Nimitz at an altitude of 2,000 feet (610 m). The strike group returned to San Diego on 2 June 2008.

2008 deployment force composition

CARSTRKGRU 11 Warships	Carrier Air Wing Eleven (CVW-11) squadrons embarked aboard flagship USS Nimitz (CVN-68)	
USS Princeton (CG-59)	Marine Fighter Attack Squadron 232 (VMFA-232): 10 F/A-18C(N)	Helicopter Anti-Submarine Squadron 6 (HS-6): 3 HH-60S and 4 SH-60S
USS Pinckney (DDG-91)	Strike Fighter Squadron 81 (VFA-81): 10 F/A-18C(N)	Fleet Logistics Support Squadron 40 (VRC-40), Det. 3: 2 C-2A
USS Chafee (DDG-90)	Strike Fighter Squadron 41 (VFA-41): 12 F/A-18F	Anti-Submarine Squadron Light 49 (HLS-49) detachments (2)
USS Higgins (DDG-76)	Strike Fighter Squadron 14 (VFA-14): 12 F/A-18E	——
USS John Paul Jones (DDG-53)	Tactical Electronics Warfare Squadron 135 (VAQ-135): 4 EA-6B	——
EOD Unit 11, Det. 15	Carrier Airborne Early Warning Squadron 117 (VAW-117): 4 E-2C 2000 NP	——

2008 deployment exercises and port visits

Number	Regional Exercises				Port Visits		Notes
Number	Duration	U.S. Force	American/Bilateral/Multilateral Partner(s)	Operating Area	Location	Dates	Notes
1st:	——	Carrier Strike Group 11	——	——	Sasebo, Japan	11 Feb. 2008	
2nd:	——	Nimitz, Princeton, John Paul Jones	——	——	Busan, South Korea	28 Feb. 2008	
3rd:	——	Chaffee	——	——	Donghae, South Korea	28 Feb. 2008	
4th:	——	Higgins	——	——	Pohang, South Korea	28 Feb. 2008	
5th:	2–13 March 2008	Carrier Strike Group 11	Key Resolve/Foal Eagle 2008: Republic of Korea Armed Forces	Western Pacific	——	——	
6th:	14–16 Mar. 2008	Carrier Strike Group 11	Expeditionary Strike Force (ESF) exercise: Task Force 76 (Essex)	Western Pacific	——	——	
7th:	29 Mar. 2008	Carrier Strike Group 11	Joint air operations: Kitty Hawk and Carrier Strike Group Five	Western Pacific	Hong Kong	4–6 Apr. 2008	
8th:	——	Carrier Strike Group 11	——	——	Apra Harbor, Guam	17–20 Apr. 2008	

=== 2009–2010 deployment ===
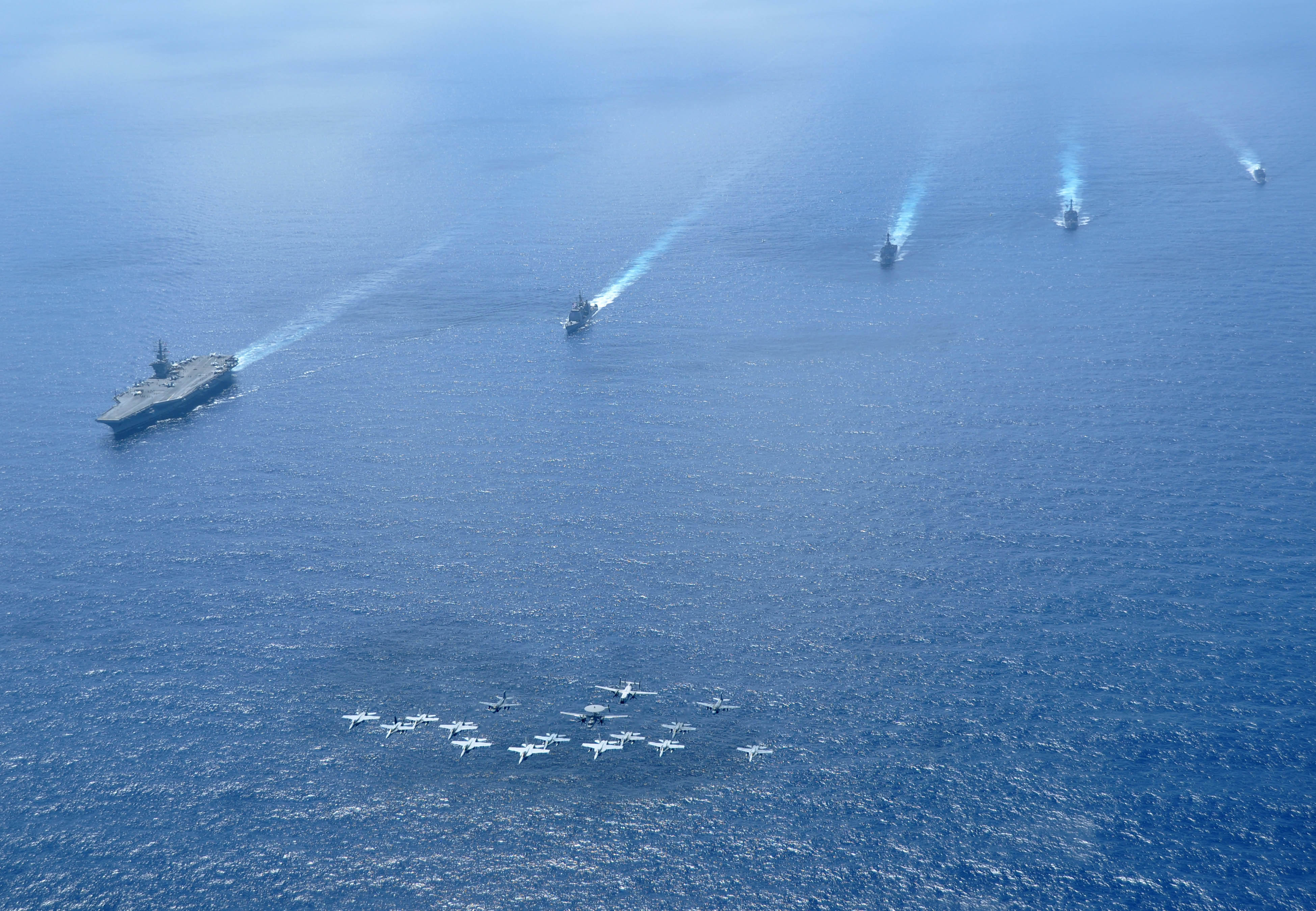
CSG 11 in South China Sea (15 Feb. 2010)

Carrier Strike Group 11 departed San Diego on 31 July 2009 on a regularly scheduled deployment commanded by Rear Admiral John W. Miller. In September 2009, it was announced that the carrier strike group deployment schedule would be changed to accommodate the delay in the return of Enterprise from overhaul. This resulted in extending the deployment to eight months.

On 4 December 2009, the group began five months in the northern Arabian Sea, providing air support to coalition forces in Afghanistan. Carrier-based aircraft provided 30 percent of the combat air support for the International Security Assistance Force (ISAF) during the time that the group was in the northern Arabian Sea. VAW-117's E-2C Hawkeye aircraft used their radar and communication systems to synchronize and direct air crews over Afghanistan. Also, EA-6B Prowlers assigned to squadron VAQ-135 jammed electronic signals in support of Operation Enduring Freedom. Effective 2 July 2009, ISAF air-ground combat support operations were ordered to take steps to minimize Afghan civilian casualties. In total, Carrier Air Wing 11 air crews flew more than 2,600 combat sorties supporting ISAF. The other strike group ships contributed to counter-piracy operations off the Horn of Africa, the protection of critical Iraqi infrastructure in the Persian Gulf, and other maritime security operations. On 26 March 2010, the strike group returned to their homeport after an eight-month deployment.

2009–2010 deployment force composition

CARSTRKGRU 11 Warships	Carrier Air Wing Eleven (CVW-11) squadrons embarked aboard flagship USS Nimitz (CVN-68)	
USS Chosin (CG-65)	Fighter Strike Squadron 97 (VFA-97): 12 F/A-18C(N)	Carrier Airborne Early Warning Squadron 117 (VAW-117): 4 E-2C 2000 NP
USS Sampson (DDG-102)	Strike Fighter Squadron 86 (VFA-86): 10 F/A-18C(N)	Helicopter Anti-Submarine Squadron 6 (HS-6): 7 HH-60S/SH-60S
USS Pinckney (DDG-91)	Strike Fighter Squadron 41 (VFA-41): 12 F/A-18F	Fleet Logistics Support Squadron 40 (VRC-40), Det. 3: 2 C-2A
USS Rentz (FFG-46)	Strike Fighter Squadron 14 (VFA-14): 12 F/A-18E	——
USNS Bridge (T-AOE-10)	Tactical Electronics Warfare Squadron 135 (VAQ-135): 4 EA-6B	——

2009–2010 deployment exercises and port visits

Number	Regional Exercises				Port Visits		Notes
Number	Duration	U.S. Force	Bilateral/Multilateral Partner(s)	Operating Area	Location	Dates	Notes
1st:	11 Aug. 2009	Carrier Strike Group 11	Undersea Warfare Exercise 09 (USWEX 09)	Hawaiian operating area	——	——	
2nd:	——	Nimitz, Sampson	——	——	Yokosuka Naval Base	28 Aug. 2009	
3rd:	——	Carrier Strike Group 11	——	——	Singapore	8 Sep. 2009	
4th:	——	Carrier Strike Group 11	——	——	Bahrain	24 Oct. 2009	
5th:	——	Carrier Strike Group 11	——	——	Phuket, Thailand	31 Jan. – 3 Feb. 2010	
6th	1–7 Feb. 2010	Carrier Strike Group 11	Royal Malaysian Navy & Royal Malaysian Air Force	South China Sea	Kuala Lumpur, Malaysia	7–10 Feb. 2010	
7th:	——	Carrier Strike Group 11	——	——	Hong Kong	17 Feb. 2010	

=== 2011–2013 operations ===
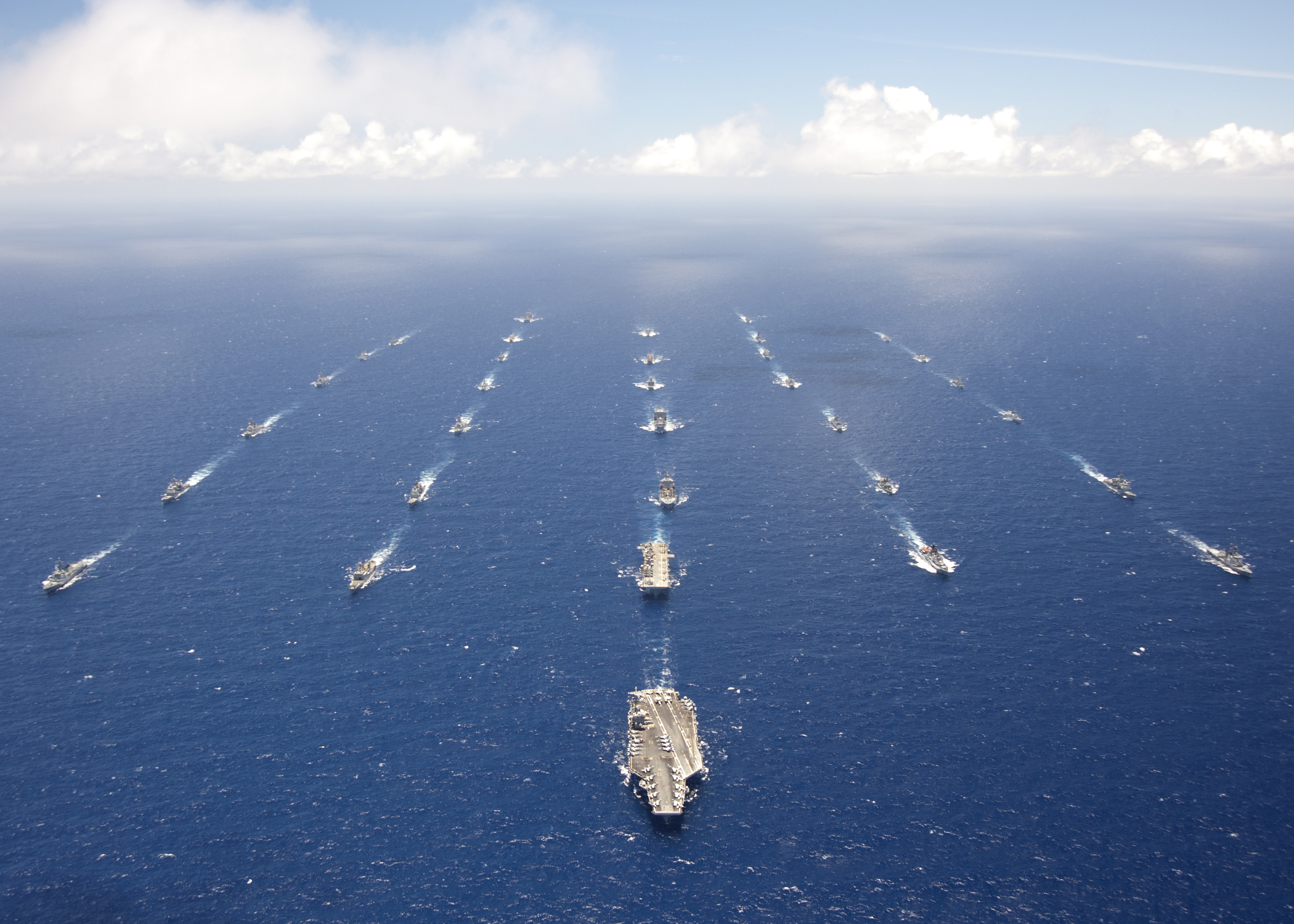
RIMPAC 2012 (27 July 2012)

Sustainment Exercise (8 April 2013)

On 11 May 2011, the U.S. Navy announced a duty station change for Carrier Strike Group 11 from Naval Air Station North Island in San Diego, California, to Naval Station Everett, Washington, in December 2011.

On 11 June 2012, Nimitz departed Everett and once Carrier Air Wing Eleven was embarked, departed Naval Air Station North Island, California, on 15 June 2012 for carrier qualifications. The Air Wing consisted of U.S. Navy strike fighter squadrons VFA-154, VFA-147, and VFA-146; U.S. Marine Corps fighter squadron VMFA-323; airborne early warning squadron VAW-117; electronic warfare squadron VAQ-142; helicopter squadrons HSC-6 and HSM-75; and Detachment 3 from squadron VRC-30.

On 2 July 2012, Nimitz pulled into Joint Base Pearl Harbor–Hickam, Hawaii, for a four-day port call prior to participating in Exercise RIMPAC 2012 that was scheduled from 29 June to 3 August 2012. Nimitz and Carrier Air Wing Eleven were the only aircraft carrier and carrier air wing to participate in RIMPAC 2012 (pictured). Following RIMPAC 2012, Nimitz departed Pearl Harbor on 3 August 2012, arriving at North Island on 9 August 2012. The aircraft from Carrier Air Wing Eleven flew off Nimitz on 8 August 2012 to return to their home air stations. Nimitz returned to Naval Station Everett, Washington, on 20 August 2012, completing a 70-day underway period.

On 29 September 2012 Nimitz departed Naval Station Everett to begin its pre-deployment training cycle and certification exercises under the supervision of the Commander, Strike Force Training Pacific. Joining Nimitz were Carrier Air Wing Eleven, the guided-missile cruiser Princeton, and the guided-missile destroyers Higgins, Shoup, Stockdale, and William P. Lawrence.

On 17 October 2012, the group began its 18-day pre-deployment Composite Training Unit Exercise. On 13 November 2012, Nimitz pulled into Naval Air Station North Island, California, to disembark part of the air wing. On 21 November 2012, it was announced that the strike group's deployment would be delayed because a cooling pump aboard the Nimitz needed to be repaired. It was also announced that Nimitz would now deploy in summer 2013.

Following repairs, on 5 April 2013, the Nimitz and Carrier Air Wing Eleven departed Naval Air Station North Island, California, to begin their scheduled Sustainment Exercise (pictured) to re-certify the group's readiness to deploy. They joined the guided-missile cruiser Princeton which had departed on 3 April 2013.

=== 2013 deployment ===
With the Nimitz undergoing repairs, Carrier Strike Group 11 deployed in two waves. The first wave consisted of four destroyers operating initially as a surface action group until the Nimitz and the rest of the strike group deployed three months later.

2013 deployment force composition

Group Warships/Units		Carrier Air Wing 11 squadrons aboard USS Nimitz (CVN-68)	
Surface Action Group	Carrier Escorts/Units	Marine Fighter Attack Squadron 323: 10 F/A-18C(N)	Carrier Airborne Early Warning Squadron 117: 4 E-2C
USS William P. Lawrence (DDG-110)	USS Princeton (CG-59)	Strike Fighter Squadron 154: 12 F/A-18F	Helicopter Sea Combat Squadron 6: 6 MH-60S
USS Stockdale (DDG-106)	USS Preble (DDG-88)	Strike Fighter Squadron 147: 12 F/A-18E	Helicopter Maritime Strike Squadron 75: 11 MH-60R
USS Shoup (DDG-86)	USS Momsen (DDG-92)	Strike Fighter Squadron 146: 10 F/A-18C	Fleet Logistics Support Squadron 30, Detach. 3: 2 C-2A
USS Higgins (DDG-76)	EODMU-11	Electronic Attack Squadron 142: 4 EA-6B	——

==== Surface action group ====
On 14 January 2013, the destroyers Higgins, Shoup, Stockdale, and William P. Lawrence departed Naval Base San Diego, California, for a deployment to the Middle East. These ships operated with the U.S. Fifth Fleet as a surface action group until the Nimitz, Carrier Air Wing Eleven, and the guided-missile cruiser Princeton deployed.

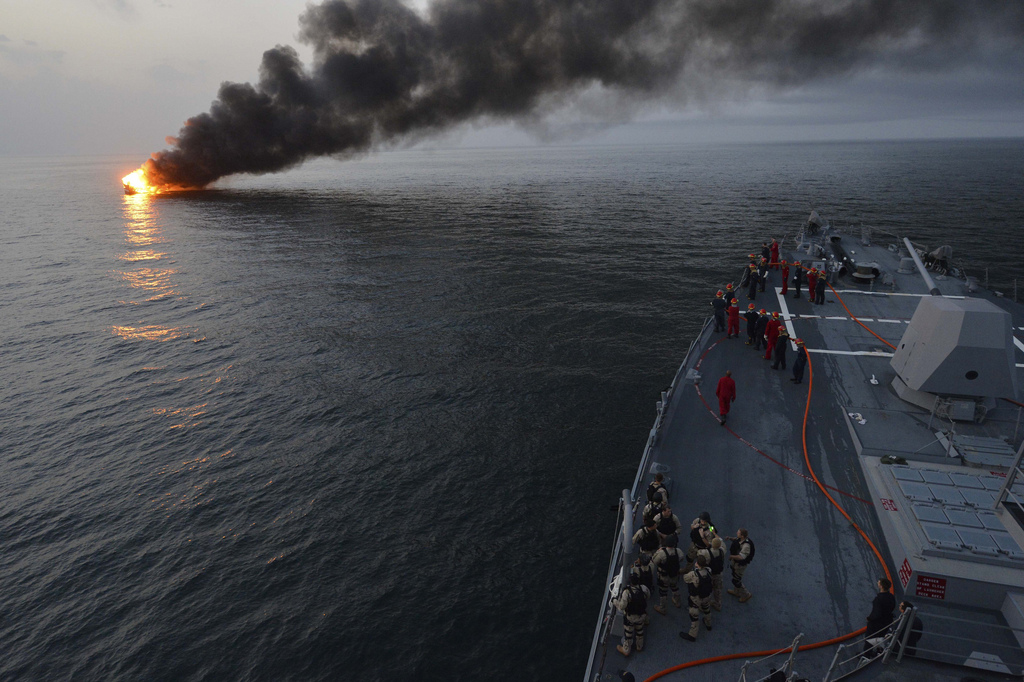
Strait of Hormuz (14 March 2013)

On 1 March 2013, the William P. Lawrence entered the Persian Gulf for operations with Carrier Strike Group Three. On 11 March 2013, the Lawrence rendered assistance to a burning vessel while operating in the Strait of Hormuz (pictured). In April 2012, on two separate occasions, the Lawrence joined the French frigate Montcalm in rendering assistance to civilian mariners in distress while operating in the Gulf of Oman as part of Combined Task Force 150. Starting 2 September 2013, William P. Lawrence began operating in the Red Sea as part of Carrier Strike Group 11.

Following bilateral mine countermeasure exercises in the Persian Gulf, the USS Higgins left the Fifth Fleet area. After paying port visits to Thailand, Japan, and Guam, the Higgins arrived at Naval Base San Diego, California, on 7 October 2013, completing a nine-month-long deployment. On 8 November 2013, the Stockdale and William P. Lawrence returned to Naval Base San Diego, California, completing a ten-month-long deployment. On 18 November 2013, the USS Shoup arrived back at Naval Station Everett, Washington. At 313 days, the Shoup completed the longest deployment by a U.S. Navy destroyer since World War II.

2013 deployment exercises and port visits

Number	Regional Exercises				Port Visits		Notes
Number	Duration	U.S. Force	Bilateral/Multilateral Partner(s)	Operating Area	Location	Dates	Notes
1st:	20–23 Jan. 2013	William P. Lawrence, Stockdale, Shoup, Higgins	Undersea Warfare Exercise	Hawaiian Islands	——	——	
2nd:	——	Shoup	——	——	Yokosuka Naval Base	4–8 Feb. 2013	
3rd:	——	Higgins	——	——	Koror, Palau	4–9 Feb. 2013	
4th:	——	Stockdale	——	——	Subic Bay, Philippines	5 Feb. 2013	
5th:	——	William P. Lawrence, Stockdale, Higgins	——	——	Singapore	15–19 Feb. 2013	
6th:	4–8 Mar. 2013	William P. Lawrence	AMAN 2013 (Note: For AMAN 2013, participating navies included Pakistan, Australia, Bangladesh, China, Indonesia, Italy, Japan, Malaysia, Sri Lanka, Turkey, UAE, the UK, and the US, as well as 20 observer nations.)	North Arabian Sea	Karachi, Pakistan	3 Mar. 2013	
7th:	——	Stockdale	——	——	Hidd, Bahrain	12–17 Mar. 2013	
8th:	——	William P. Lawrence	——	——	Hidd, Bahrain	15–18 Mar. 2013	
9th:	23–24 Mar. 2013	Higgins	Joint air-sea exercises (Note: Destroyer Squadron 50, USS Green Bay (LPD-20), USS Sirocco (PC-6), USS Chinook (PC-9), USS Whirlwind (PC-11), and several United States air assets.)	Persian Gulf	Jebel Ali, UAE	15 Apr. 2012	
10th:	——	Stockdale	——	——	Jebel Ali, UAE	9–13 Apr. 2013	
11th:	——	William P. Lawrence	——	——	Jebel Ali, UAE	26–30 Apr. 2013	
12th:	28 Apr. to 6 May 2013	Stockdale	Eagle Resolve 2013: PSF	Persian Gulf	Eilat, Israel	28–31 May 2013	
13th:	16–30 May 2013	William P. Lawrence	IMCMEX 13: CTF 521	Persian Gulf	Hidd, Bahrain	12–13 May 2013	
14th:	30 Jun. 2013	Higgins	RFA Cardigan Bay	Persian Gulf	Hidd, Bahrain	26–30 May 2013	
15th:	——	William P. Lawrence	——	——	Jubail, Saudi Arabia	11 Jun 2013	
16th:	17 Jun 2013	Stockdale	Eager Lion 2013	Red Sea	Aqaba, Jordan	17 Jun 2013	
17th:	——	Higgins, Shoup	——	——	Hidd, Bahrain	19–23 Jun 2013	
18th:	——	William P. Lawrence	——	——	Muscat, Oman	26–30 Jun. 2013	
19th:	10–14 Aug. 2013	Shoup	Exercise Spartan Kopis	Persian Gulf	Jebel Ali, U.A.E.	15 Aug. 2013	
20th:	——	William P. Lawrence, Stockdale, Shoup	——	——	Singapore	14–17 Oct. 2013	

==== Nimitz strike group ====
Flight deck ops in the Gulf of Oman (June 13, 2013)

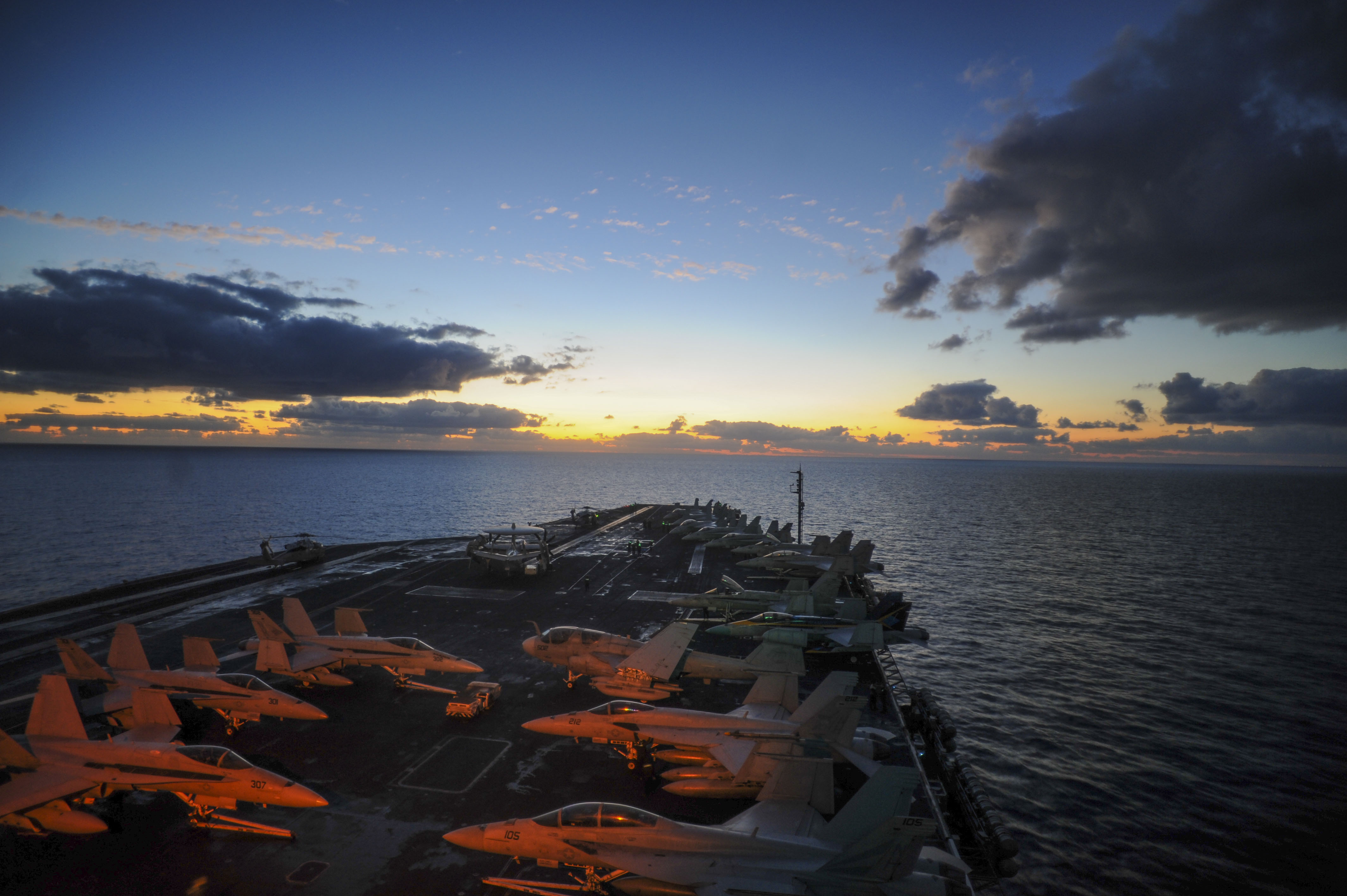
Suez Canal (20 October 2013)

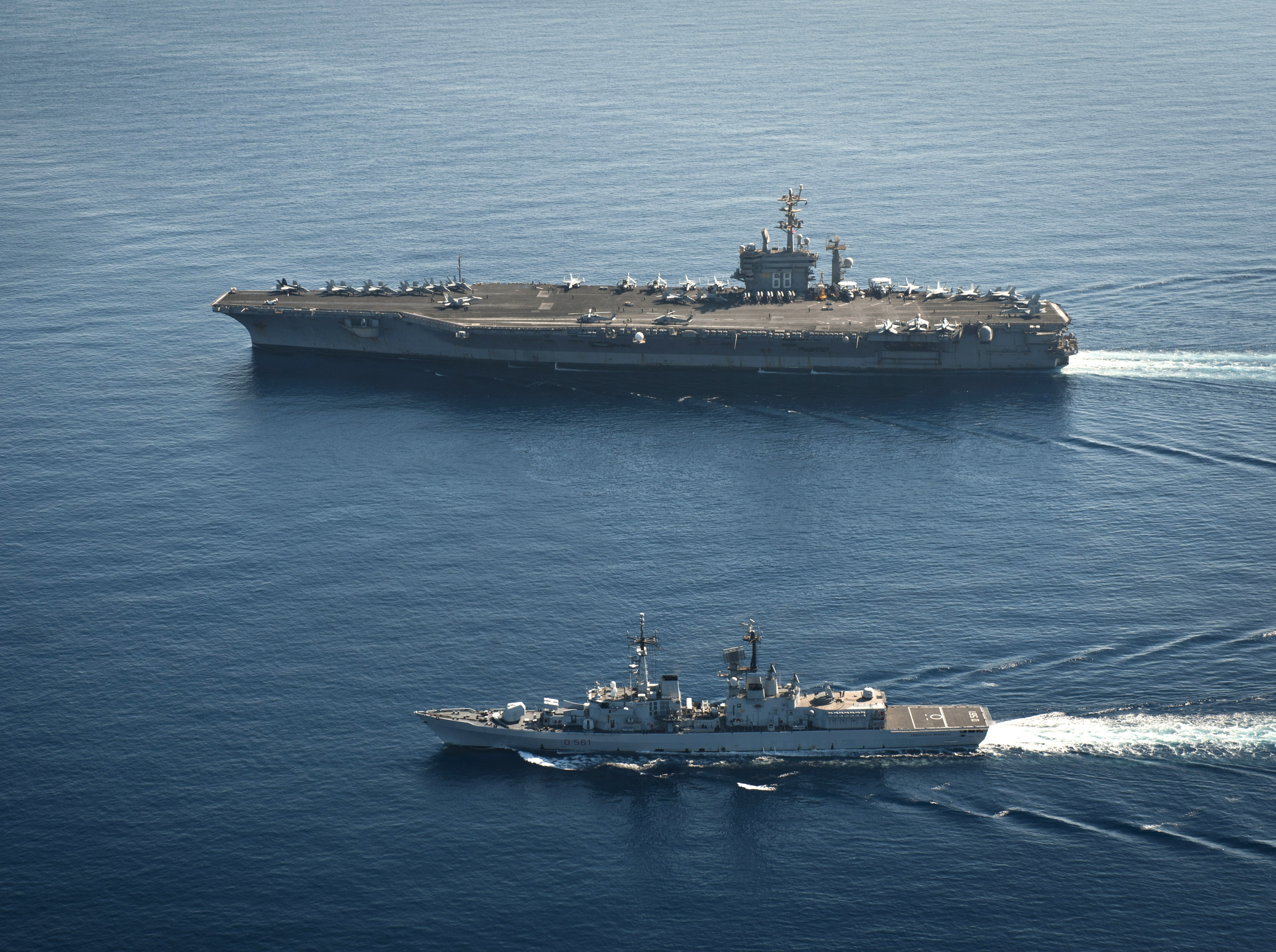
Nimitz alongside the Italian destroyer Francesco Mimbelli in the Mediterranean (October 26, 2013)

On 19 April 2013, the Nimitz and Carrier Air Wing Eleven departed Naval Air Station North Island, California, joining the cruiser Princeton to begin their deployment. On 3 May 2013, the two ships joined the U.S. Seventh Fleet. Nimitz and Princeton exercised with the Republic of Korea Navy amid the ongoing 2013 Korean crisis over North Korean actions. The strike group's deployment to the Seventh Fleet coincided with the joint exercises of China's three operational fleets in the South China Sea amid the ongoing Spratly Islands dispute between China and the Philippines.

Carrier Strike Group 11 entered the U.S. Fifth Fleet's area on 9 June 2013, relieving Carrier Strike Group Eight. On 13 June 2013, Carrier Air Wing Eleven aircraft launched their first combat sorties in support of Operation Enduring Freedom in Afghanistan (pictured). The British Type 45 destroyer Dragon also joined the group in the Gulf of Oman. The Royal Navy warship maintained anti-aircraft defenses, directed aircraft sorties, and provided assistance to returning planes landing on the Nimitz.

On 22 August 2013, USS Momsen returned to Naval Station Everett, Washington, after a four-month underway period of independent operations with the U.S. Seventh Fleet. During part of this period, Momsen operated with Carrier Strike Group Five led by the carrier George Washington.

Carrier Strike Group 11 was relieved by Carrier Strike Group Ten on 26 August 2013. At the time of this relief, Carrier Air Wing 11 had completed over 1,200 sorties in support of combat operations in Afghanistan for a total of 6,500 flight hours. Both U.S. Navy carrier strike groups initially remained in the north Arabian Sea pending potential military action against Syria amid allegations that the regime of Syrian president Bashar al-Assad used chemical weapons during the ongoing Syrian civil war, including the gas attacks that occurred on 21 August 2013.

On 2 September 2013, Carrier Strike Group 11 transited the Bab-el-Mandeb and moved northward into the Red Sea for potential combat operations against Syria. At this point, the strike group consisted of the carrier Nimitz with Carrier Air Wing 11 embarked, the cruiser Princeton, and the destroyers William P. Lawrence, Stockdale, and Shoup. On 12 September 2013, the U.S. Department of Defense announced that U.S. naval forces would remain in the region as Russian and American diplomats negotiated the turn-over of Syria's stockpile of chemical weapons to the United Nations, with spokesman George E. Little noting: "We’re prepared for any potential military contingencies that might involve Syria."

On 20 October 2013, Carrier Strike Group 11 transited the Suez Canal to join the U.S. Sixth Fleet. This was the first time that the carrier Nimitz had operated in the Mediterranean Sea since 1998 (pictured). On 8 November 2013, Carrier Strike Group 11 transited the Suez Canal, leaving the U.S. Sixth Fleet's area of operations again. Nimitz was initially intended to join Operation Damayan, the U.S. military's humanitarian mission to the Philippines following Typhoon Haiyan, but plans were changed and the carrier was released to return home.

On 29 October 2013, USS Princeton returned to Naval Station San Diego, California, following an extended seven-month deployment. Following operations with the U.S. Fifth and Seventh fleets, Princeton paid port-calls to the United Arab Emirates, Guam, and Pearl Harbor, Hawaii. On 28 November 2013, USS Preble returned to Naval Station San Diego. On 11 December 2013, squadrons of Carrier Air Wing Eleven (CVW-11) began departing the carrier Nimitz to return to their home naval air stations. During this 252-day deployment, CVW-11 aircraft made 9,344 launches and flew 1,374 sorties in support of combat operations in Afghanistan for a total of over 29,440 flight hours. On 12 December 2013, the carrier Nimitz arrived at Naval Station San Diego, California, completing the 8 1/2-month-long 2013 overseas deployment for Carrier Strike Group Eleven. Nimitz returned to Naval Station Everett, Washington, on 16 December 2013.

2013 deployment exercises and port visits

Number	Regional Exercises				Port Visits		Notes
Number	Duration	U.S. Force	Bilateral/Multilateral Partner(s)	Operating Area	Location	Dates	Notes
1st:	——	Carrier Strike Group Eleven	——	——	Phuket, Thailand	28–30 May 2013	
2nd:	22–26 Jun. 2013	Preble	Pacific Bond 2013 (Note: Destroyer Squadron 15, USS Chung-Hoon (DDG 93), HMAS Sydney (FFG-03), JDS Murasame.)	Philippine Sea	Fleet Activities Yokosuka	29 May 2013	
3rd:	——	Preble	——	——	Guam	27 Jun to 2 Jul 2013	
4th:	——	Carrier Strike Group Eleven	——	——	Dubai, UAE	5–9 Jul 2013	
5th:	——	Preble	——	——	Sydney, Australia	29 Jul. 2013	
6th:	——	Princeton	——	——	Singapore	14–17 Oct. 2013	
7th:	——	Preble	——	——	Busan, ROK	14–17 Oct. 2013	
8th:	22 Oct. 2013	Carrier Strike Group Eleven	Air defense exercise: Chevalier Paul	Mediterranean Sea	Naples, Italy	30 Oct. 2013	

=== 2014–2016 operations & maintenance cycle ===
On 23 June 2014, the Commander, Naval Air Forces, U.S. Pacific Fleet announced that the flagship of Carrier Strike Group Eleven, the Nimitz, is scheduled to change its home-port to Puget Sound Naval Shipyard for its 2015 planned incremental maintenance period. Between 20 and 31 October 2014, Carrier Strike Group Eleven participated in multi-lateral task group exercises with Canadian, Japanese and U.S. naval units. On 13 January 2015, the Nimitz arrived at Naval Base Kitsap, Washington, completing its home-port change-over. On 13 January 2015, Nimitz began its 16-month Extended Planned Incremental Availability (EPIA) major maintenance cycle at the Puget Sound Naval Shipyard and Intermediate Maintenance Facility (PSNS & IMF) at Bremerton, Washington.

=== 2017 ===
In late May 2017, the US Navy announced that CSG-11 would be deployed to the western Pacific Ocean, joining Carrier Strike Group 1 (USS Carl Vinson (CVN-70)) and Carrier Strike Group 5 (USS Ronald Reagan (CVN-76)), amidst Trump administration concerns over North Korea. Following the collision that damaged the destroyer USS Fitzgerald, its place within the strike group was taken up by the Royal New Zealand Navy frigate HMNZS Te Kaha which was on deployment in the western Pacific after a request by US authorities.

=== 2026 deployment ===
On 20 May 2026, Carrier Strike Group 11 arrived in the Caribbean, following ongoing tensions with Cuba.

2026 deployment force composition

Warships	Carrier Air Wing Seventeen squadrons embarked aboard USS Nimitz (CVN-68)	
USS Gridley (DDG-101)	Strike Fighter Squadron 22: F/A-18E/F	Electronic Attack Squadron 139: EA-18G
USS Patuxent	Strike Fighter Squadron 94: F/A-18E	Helicopter Sea Combat Squadron 6: MH-60S
	Strike Fighter Squadron 137: F/A-18E	Helicopter Maritime Strike Squadron 73: MH-60R
——	Strike Fighter Squadron 146: F/A-18E/F	Airborne Command and Control Squadron 121: E-2D
——	Fleet Logistics Multi-Mission Squadron 30 (VRM-30): CV-22 Osprey	——

== See also ==
- History of the United States Navy
- List of United States Navy aircraft squadrons

== Notes ==
Footnotes

Citations

== Sources ==
- Morison, Samuel Loring (September 2014). "U.S. Battle Force Aviation Changes 2013–14". Naval Institute Proceedings. 140 (4): 48–50. ISSN 0041-798X. "Registration required."
- —— (May 2009). "U.S. Naval Battle Force Changes 1 January 2008—31 December 2008: Aircraft Carrier Air Wing Assignments and Composition as of 17 Feb 2009". Naval Institute Proceedings. 135 (5): 118–120. ISSN 0041-798X. "Registration required."
- —— (May 2010). "U.S. Naval Battle Force Changes 1 January 2009—31 December 2009: Aircraft Carrier Air Wing Assignments and Composition as of 1 March 2010". Naval Institute Proceedings. 136 (5): 106–116. ISSN 0041-798X. "Registration required."
- —— (May 2011). "U.S. Naval Battle Force Changes 1 January 2010—31 December 2010: Aircraft Carrier Air Wing Assignments and Composition as of 1 March 2011". Naval Institute Proceedings. 137 (5): 117–120. ISSN 0041-798X. "Registration required."
- —— (May 2012). "U.S. Naval Battle Force Changes 1 January 2011—31 December 2011: Aircraft Carrier Air Wing Assignments and Composition as of 2 April 2012". Naval Institute Proceedings. 138 (5): 112–113. ISSN 0041-798X. "Registration required."
