= Monson (surname) =

Monson is a surname. Notable people with the surname include:

- Ander Monson, American novelist, poet, and nonfiction writer
- Dan Monson (born 1961), American college basketball head coach; son of Don Monson
- David Monson (North Dakota politician) (born 1950)
- David Smith Monson (born 1945), U.S. Representative from Utah 1985–1987
- Don Monson (1933–2025), American college basketball head coach
- Dori Monson (1961–2022), American radio personality
- Sir Edmund Monson, 1st Baronet (1834–1909), British diplomat, minister and ambassador
- Sir Edmund Monson, 3rd Baronet (1883–1969), British diplomat
- George Monson (1755–1823), English amateur cricketer
- Sir Henry Monson, 3rd Baronet (1653–1718), English politician
- Henry Monson (gaoler) (1793–1866), New Zealand settler
- Ingrid Monson, American academic
- Jeff Monson (born 1971), American mixed martial arts fighter
- Sir John Monson, 2nd Baronet (1599–1683), English landowner and politician
- John Monson (c. 1628 – 1674), English politician
- John Monson, 11th Baron Monson (1932–2011), British hereditary peer, crossbench member of the House of Lords, civil liberties campaigner
- Logan Monson, American politician
- Marianne Monson (born 1975), American children's author
- Martin O. Monson (1885–1969), American politician
- Robert Monson (by 1532–1583), English politician and judge
- Shaun Monson, American animal, human and environmental rights activist and film director
- Sir Thomas Monson, 1st Baronet (1565–1641), English politician
- Thomas S. Monson (1927–2018), 16th President of The Church of Jesus Christ of Latter-day Saints (LDS Church)
- Walter Monson (1909–1988), Canadian ice hockey player
- William Monson (disambiguation), several people

== See also ==
- Monsen, an alternate spelling
- Momsen, another surname
