= Mommsen =

Origin
- Language: Low German
- Meaning: son of "Mommo, Momme"
- Region of origin: Northern Germany

Other names
- Variant forms: 1. Momber, Momper, Mommer 2. Mombert, Mompert, Mommert, Mommertz; Munibert

Mommsen is a surname, and may refer to one of a family of German historians, see Mommsen family:

- Hans Mommsen (1930–2015), historian known for arguing a functionalist explanation of the Holocaust
- Norlin Mommsen (born 1957), American politician
- Preston Mommsen (born 1987), South African-born Scottish cricketer
- Theodor Mommsen (1817–1903), classical scholar, winner of the Nobel Prize in Literature
- Wolfgang Mommsen (1930–2004), historian of 19th- and 20th-century Britain and Germany

== See also ==
- Momsen (especially Charles Momsen)
