= Monsen =

Monsen is a surname. Notable people with the surname include:

- Arild Monsen (born 1962), Norwegian cross-country skier.
- Fredrik Monsen (1878–1954), Norwegian politician.
- Gabriel Monsen (1798–1882), Norwegian politician.
- Georg Monsen (1922–2015), Norwegian football player.
- Lars Monsen (born 1963), Norwegian journalist.
- Lloyd Monsen (1931–2026), American soccer and baseball player.
- Magdalon Monsen (1910–1953), Norwegian football player.
- Marie Monsen (1878–1962), Norwegian Christian missionary.
- Mogens Larsen Monsen (1727–1802), Norwegian timber trader.
- Nina Karin Monsen (born 1943), Norwegian philosopher.
- Ole Monsen Mjelde (1865–1942), Norwegian politician.
- Otto Monsen (1887–1979), Norwegian track and field athlete.
- Per Monsen (1913–1985), Norwegian editor.
- Per Erik Monsen (1946–2008), Norwegian politician.
- Randi Monsen (1910–1997), Norwegian illustrator.
- Rolf Monsen (1899–1987), American Olympic skier.

== See also ==
- Monson (disambiguation)
