= Peter H. Daly (U.S. Navy) =

United States Navy vice admiral

Peter Hasten Daly
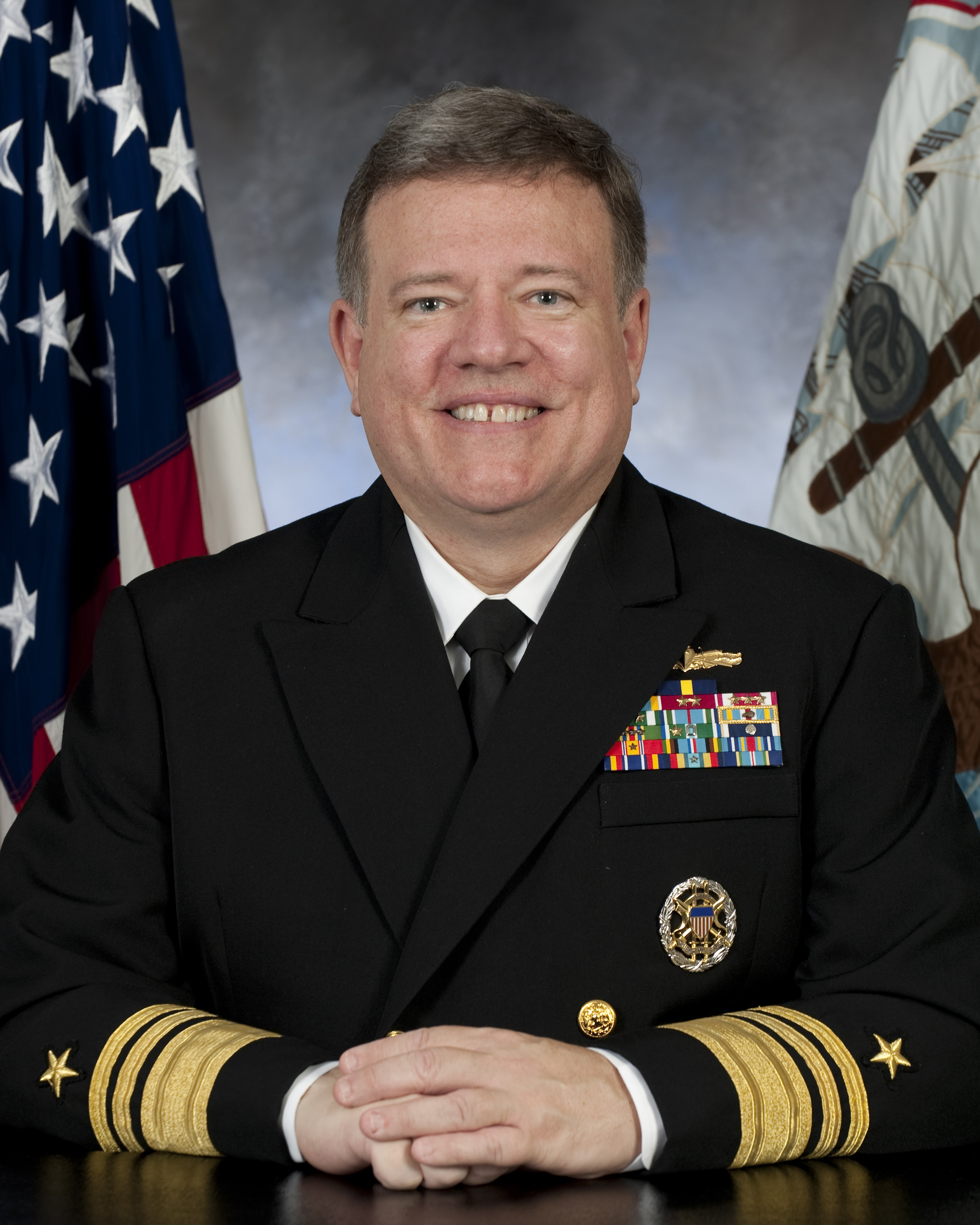
- Vice Admiral Peter H. Daly, U.S. Navy
- Born: December 12, 1955 (age 70); Chicago, Illinois
- Education: College of the Holy Cross (BA); Naval Postgraduate School (MA)
- Military career
- Allegiance: United States of America
- Branch: United States Navy
- Service years: 1977–2011
- Rank: Vice Admiral
- Commands: Deputy Commander and Chief of Staff, U.S. Fleet Forces Command; Carrier Strike Group 11; Destroyer Squadron 31; USS Russell
- Awards: Navy Distinguished Service Medal; Defense Superior Service Medal; Legion of Merit
- Other work: CEO of United States Naval Institute

Peter Hasten Daly is a retired United States Navy vice admiral who served as Deputy Commander and Chief of Staff, U.S. Fleet Forces Command. He was the CEO of the United States Naval Institute from 2011 until 2023.

== Personal life ==
Daly was born in Chicago, Illinois. Daly graduated in 1977 from the College of the Holy Cross with a Bachelor of Arts in Economics. In 1983 he earned a master's degree in Operations Analysis from the Naval Postgraduate School.

== Career ==
Upon graduation from College of the Holy Cross, Daly commissioned as an ensign in the United States Navy through the Naval Reserve Officer Training Corps.

His sea duty assignments include USS Roark (FF-1053) as gunnery/anti-submarine officer and navigator; USS Stump (DD-978) as chief engineer; and as executive officer aboard USS Hercules (PHM-2) and USS Yorktown (CG-48). Daly commanded the destroyer USS Russell (DDG-59) from the early stages as a pre-commissioning unit through commissioning, culminating with a successful deployment to the Persian Gulf taking part in combat operations in support of Operation Desert Strike.

He commanded Destroyer Squadron 31 serving as sea combat commander for Abraham Lincoln Battle Group during Rim of the Pacific 2000, and throughout a Persian Gulf deployment supporting Operation Southern Watch.

His shore assignments include flag aide to Commander, Naval Surface Force, U.S. Atlantic Fleet, in the Surface Warfare Programs and Budget Division (OP-30); deputy executive assistant to the Vice Chief of Naval Operations, on the Joint Staff as a program analyst and executive assistant to the Director of Force Structure, Resources, and Assessments (J-8); executive assistant to the Commander of the Pacific Fleet; and, later, as executive assistant to the Commander of the U.S. Pacific Command.

As a flag officer, he served as deputy director for Resources and Acquisition (J-8) in the Joint Staff and then served as senior military assistant to the Secretary of the Navy.

Returning to sea, he served as commander, Carrier Strike Group 11. During this tour, he deployed to 5th and 7th Fleet Areas of Responsibility executing combat operations in support of Operations Enduring and Iraqi Freedom. As Commander, Carrier Strike Group 11, he led Task Forces 50, 152, and 58 in support of Operation Iraqi Freedom and maritime interception operations in the Persian Gulf.

In August 2008, he reported for duty as deputy commander, U.S. Fleet Forces Command.

Upon retiring from the Navy, Daly served as CEO of the U.S. Naval Institute from July 2011 through November 2023. During this period, the Naval Institute reformed its governance, recapitalized itself, and digitized its content. The Naval Institute exponentially increased its reach and engagement though its core website, the start-up of USNI News, greatly expanded social media, expansion of live events, and the building of the Jack C. Taylor Conference Center.
