= VAW-117 =

Carrier Airborne Command and Control Squadron One One Seven
- VAW-117 insignia
- Active: 1 July 1974 - present
- Country: United States of America
- Branch: United States Navy
- Type: Airborne early warning Command and control
- Size: 190+
- Part of: Carrier Air Wing 9 Carrier Strike Group 3
- Garrison/HQ: NAS Point Mugu
- Nickname: The Wallbangers
- Mascot: The Lemur
- Engagements: Operation Praying Mantis; Operation Earnest Will; Operation Fiery Vigil; Operation Desert Storm; Operation Restore Hope; Operation Southern Watch; Operation Desert Fox; Operation Enduring Freedom; Global War On Terror; Operation Iraqi Freedom; Operation Prosperity Guardian; Operation Poseidon Archer; Operation Epic Fury

Aircraft flown
- Electronic warfare: E-2D Hawkeye

Airborne Command & Control Squadron 117 (VAW-117) is an airborne early warning (AEW) and command and control (C2) squadron. Nicknamed "The Wallbangers,” it flies the E-2D Hawkeye, the only carrier-capable command and control aircraft. The squadron is based at NAS Point Mugu and deploys as part of Carrier Air Wing 9 (CVW-9) on board the USS Abraham Lincoln.

== History ==
=== 1970s ===
Established at NAS North Island, California on 1 July 1974, as part of Fighter Early Warning Wing, U.S. Pacific Fleet, VAW-117 received its first E-2B aircraft (Buno: 151713) on 15 October 1974. In July of the following year VAW-117, along with all NAS North Island E-2B squadrons, executed a home port shift to NAS Miramar. On 15 October 1975, VAW-117 departed on its first deployment on board USS Independence as part of Carrier Air Wing Seven (CVW-7) to the Mediterranean Sea. The squadron again deployed with the USS Independence from March to October 1977. In 1978, the squadron was assigned to the operational control of Carrier Air Wing Two (CVW-2) on board USS Ranger (CV-61), and in February 1979 began its first deployment to the Western Pacific (WESTPAC).

=== 1980s ===
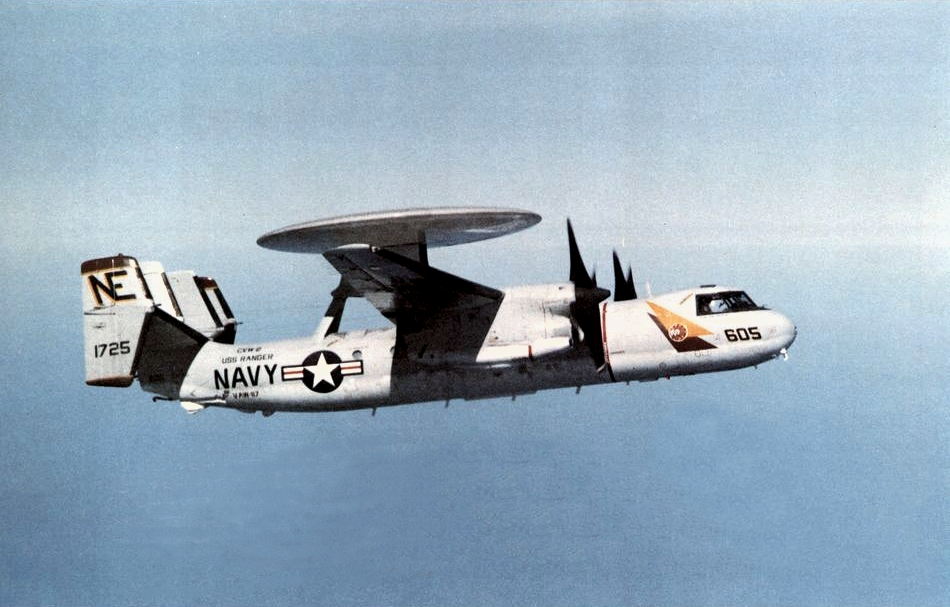
An E-2B Hawkeye of VAW-117, in 1980.

VAW-117 again deployed in September 1980 with the USS Ranger and CVW-2, returning home in May 1981. Then in October the squadron completed the five month transition from the E-2B to the E-2C. In 1982, VAW-117, along with CVW-2, swapped to embark aboard USS Enterprise (CVN-65) and on 1 September 1980 departed on their first deployment with the E-2C.

In 1988, on board USS Enterprise (CVN-65), VAW-117 played a key command and control role in providing crucial secure data and voice communications links between the USS Enterprise Battle Group (under Rear Admiral R.G. Zeller, Commander, Cruiser-Destroyer Group 3) and the Joint Task Force Middle East Commander in the Persian Gulf during Operation Praying Mantis. The operation resulted in coordinated attacks and destruction of Iranian oil rigs and surface combatants. During this deployment VAW-117 conducted numerous flight operations and escort missions in support of Operation Earnest Will, the protection of Kuwaiti-owned tankers from Iranian attack. On 16 September 1989 VAW-117 embarked on USS Enterprise for the start of a world cruise, participating in Cope Thunder, Valiant Blitz, and Operation Classic Resolve returning home in March 1990.

=== 1990s ===
From September to November 1990, VAW-117 was embarked on USS Abraham Lincoln (CVN-72) while she relocated from the Atlantic to the Pacific. Now attached to Carrier Air Wing Eleven and USS Abraham Lincoln (CVN-72), the squadron deployed as part of the ship’s maiden WESTPAC voyage in May 1991 and also participated in Operation Desert Storm. During this deployment, VAW-117 additionally assisted in the evacuation of dependents from the Philippines after the eruption of Mount Pinatubo during Operation Fiery Vigil, being awarded the Joint Meritorious Unit Award for its part. In 1993 the squadron deployed again, this time providing critical Command and Control functions to Operation Southern Watch and Operation Restore Hope. In January 1994 VAW-117 transitioned to the E-2C Group II aircraft with the APS-145 radar.

Following a Congressional repeal of Title 10 USC 6015 (law barring women from combatant ships) in November 1993, the Wallbangers welcomed their first female Aviator and Officer on 8 March 1994, and first female enlisted service member on 23 July 1994.

After a WESTPAC deployment between April and October 1995, VAW-117 and CVW-11 swapped to the USS Kitty Hawk (CV-63) to then deploy again in October 1996 and return home in April 1997. 1998 brought another swap for CWW-11, this time to embark aboard USS Carl Vinson (CVN-70) and deploy in support of several excursions and Operation Desert Fox. In 1999, VAW-117 was selected to provide operational testing for the Navy's newest AEW upgrade, the MCU/ACIS (Mission Computer Upgrade/ Advance Computer Information System).

=== 2000s ===
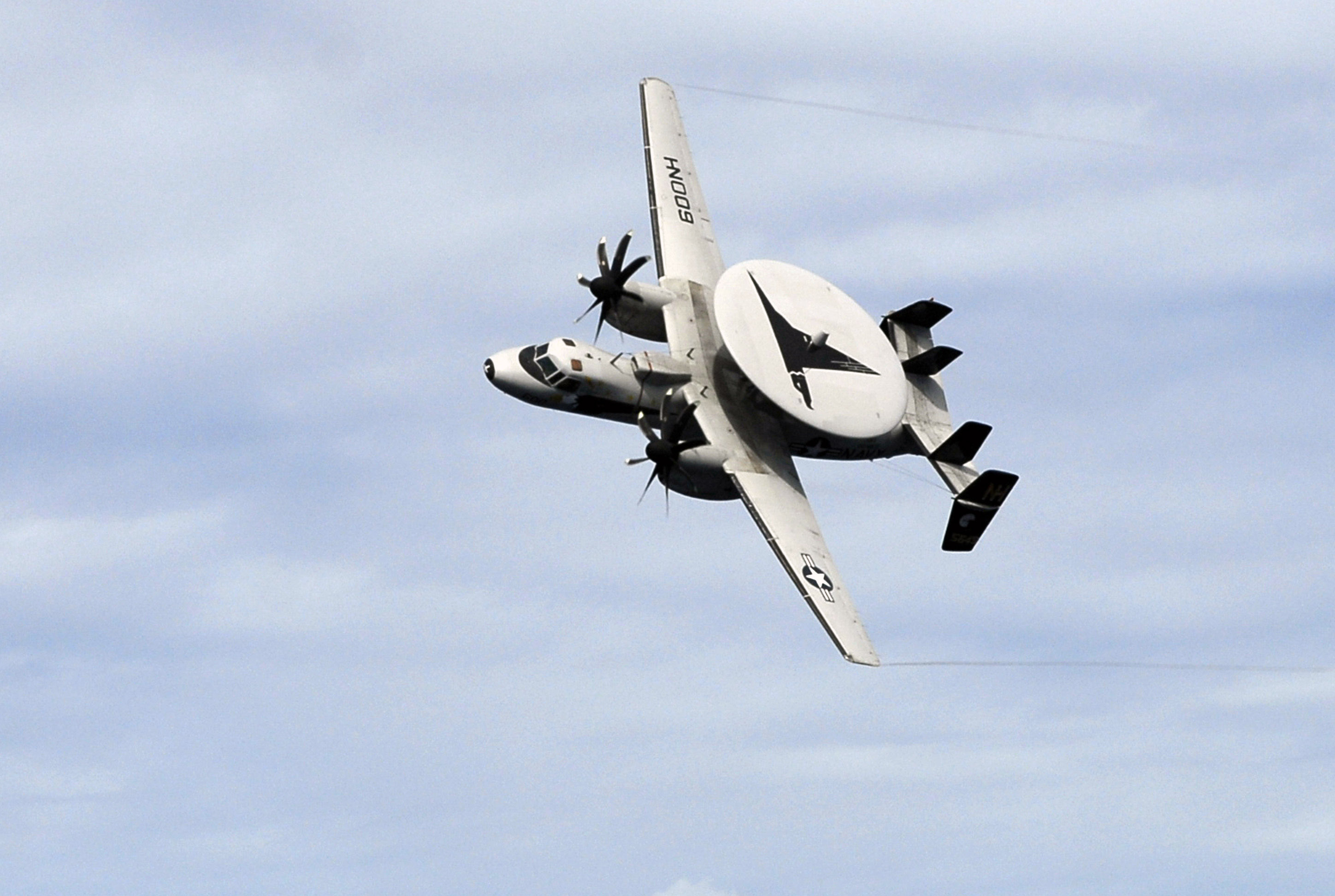
A VAW-117 E-2C conducts a flyover, 2007.

In July 2001, VAW-117 was the first squadron to deploy with the new MCU/ACIS system. WESTPAC 2001–02 on board USS Carl Vinson proved to be an active deployment. After the September 11 attacks in 2001, aircraft from VAW-117 and CVW-11 were among the first aircraft to lead the strikes on Afghanistan as part of Operation Enduring Freedom. The extensive radar and communication equipment on board the E-2C Hawkeye allowed the squadron to continuously provide battle space management over Pakistan and southern Afghanistan, ensuring the safety of all airborne assets and clearance from commercial air routes. The squadron's Hawkeyes served as an information-clearing house, providing a communications relay between command authorities on the ground and tactical aircraft airborne. VAW-117 was the first fleet squadron to receive the HE-2K variant of the Hawkeye and also the first fleet Hawkeye squadron to receive the Cooperative Engagement Capability system (CEC).

In May 2005, VAW-117 deployed on USS Nimitz (CVN-68) with CVW-11 in support of Operation Iraqi Freedom. This was VAW-117's first deployment with the HE2K variant. During the deployment, VAW-117 flew into Karachi, Pakistan, and Goa, India, to display the E-2C to partner nations. The Nimitz, while on deployment, visited Hong Kong; Kuala Lumpur, Malaysia; Guam; Manama, Bahrain; Dubai, UAE; Perth, Australia; and Pearl Harbor, Hawaii, twice.

In April 2007, VAW-117 deployed on WESTPAC 2007. The squadron flew 101 sorties and 227 hours in direct support of Operation Enduring Freedom and the Iraq War. It also took part in several exercises, including Valiant Shield and Malabar.

In January 2008, the squadron deployed on a four-month surge to the Western Pacific, where it took part in Exercise Foal Eagle 08. During the course of the cruise, VAW-117 demonstrated its aviation skills, earning the CVW-11 Top Hook Award for the first time in nearly eight years.

In 2009, CDR Valerie Overstreet took command of VAW-117 and became the first female E-2 Hawkeye squadron Commanding Officer.

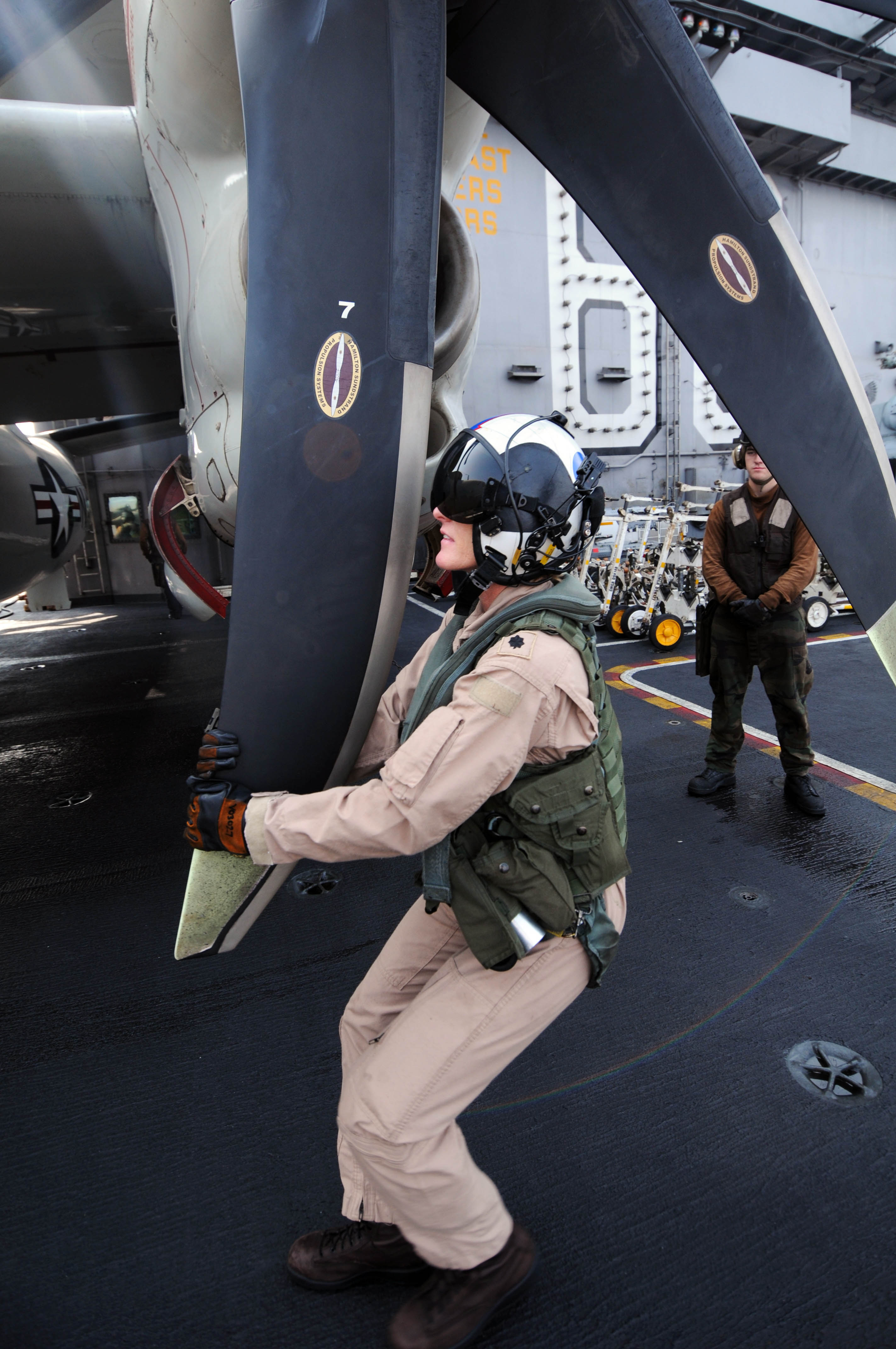
CDR Overstreet conducts preflight inspections, October 2009.

=== 2010s ===
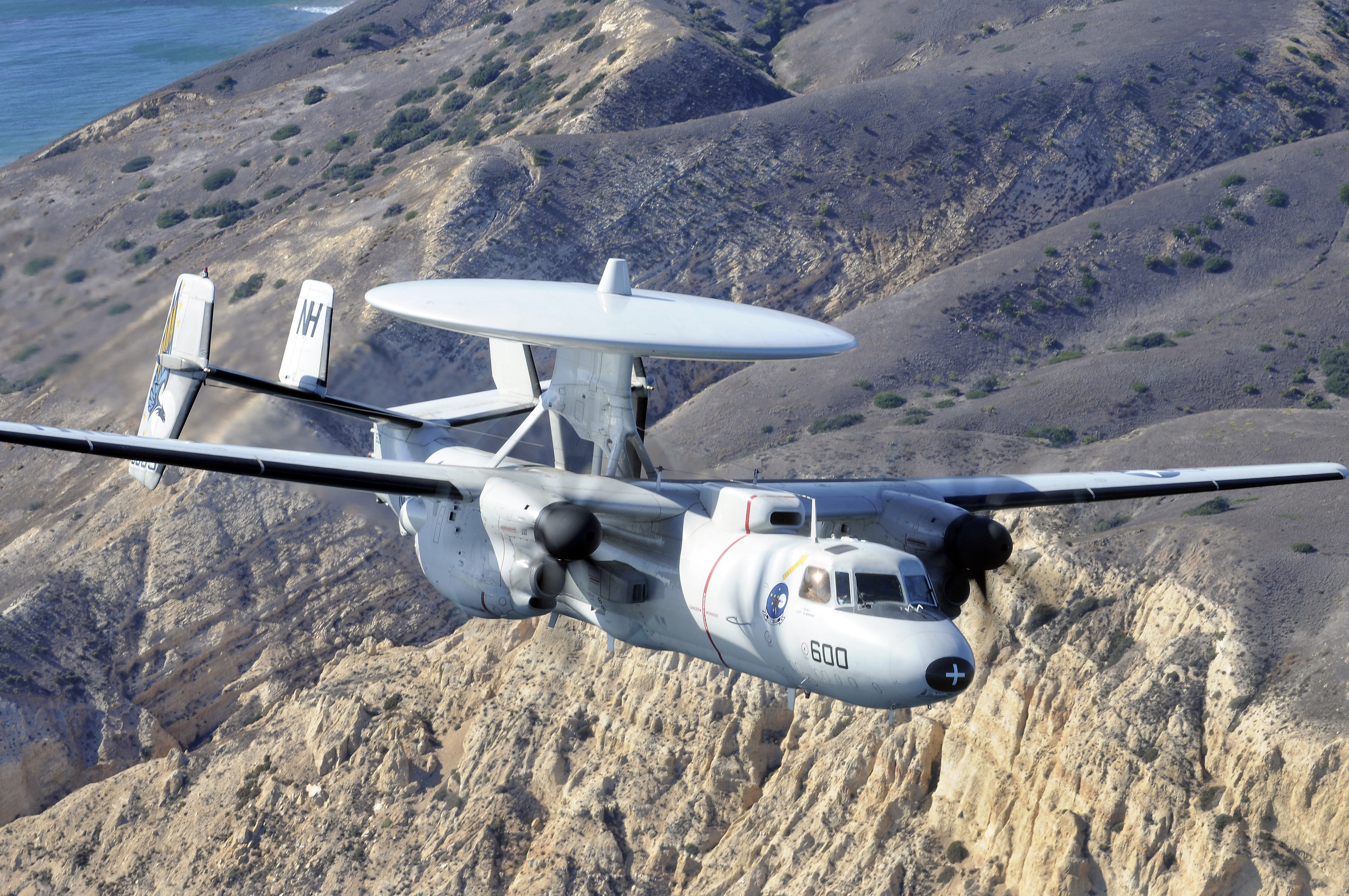
VAW-117 E-2C in flight near NAS Point Mugu in November 2012.

In April 2013 the squadron deployed with CVW-11 on board USS Nimitz in support of Operation Enduring Freedom. It ended up being an extended deployment of eight months, and they returned on 10 December 2013. During the deployment, their outstanding landing grades earned them the coveted "Golden Hook" award for having the best overall landing performance of the fixed-wing squadrons.

In January 2015, the squadron transferred to Carrier Air Wing 7 (CVW-7) aboard USS Harry S. Truman.

In 2016, VAW-117 was awarded the Battle Efficiency Award while on board USS John C. Stennis.

=== 2020s ===
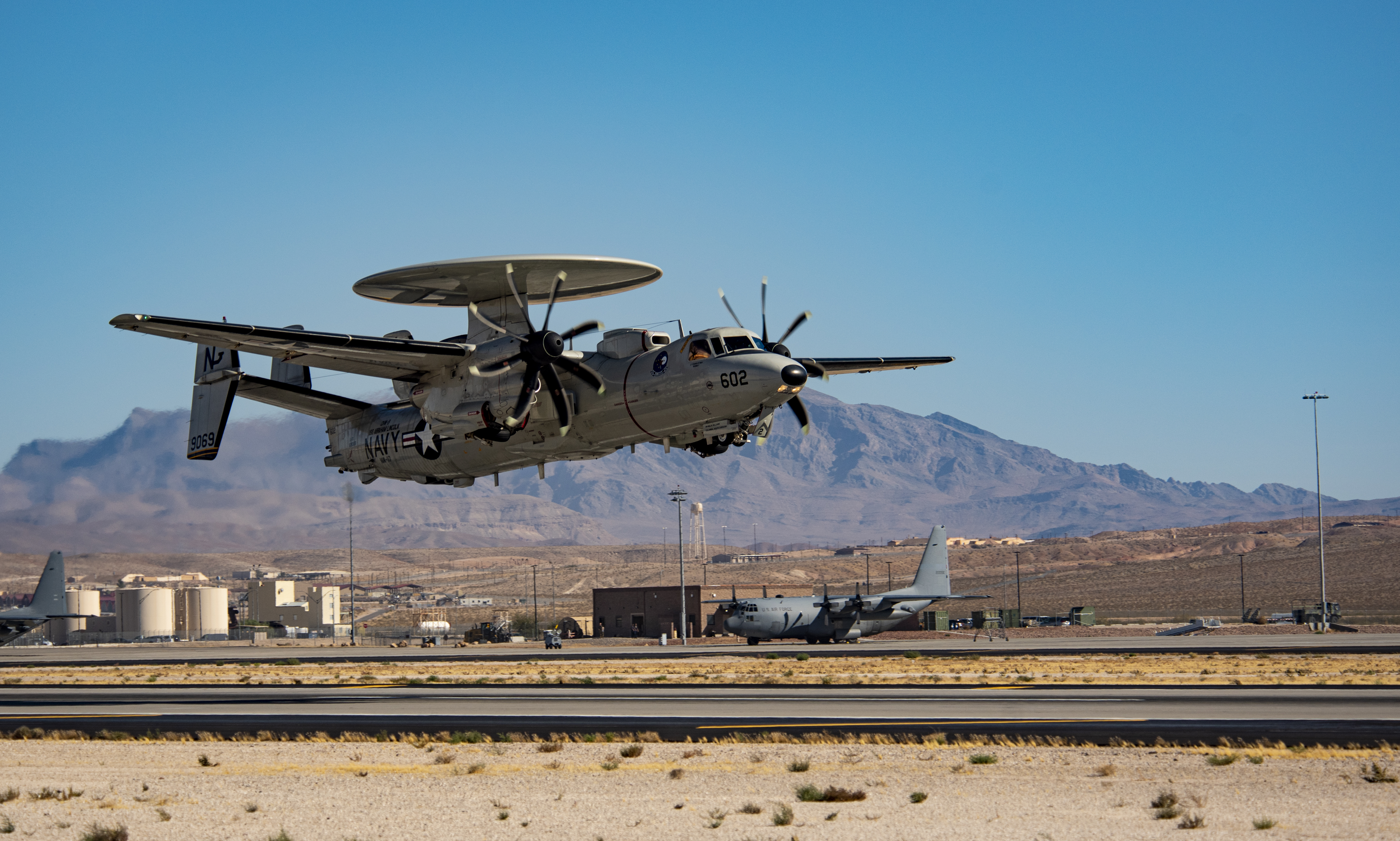
VAW-117 E-2D operated by the Carrier Airborne Early Warning Weapons School (CAEWWS) takes-off during a U.S. Air Force Weapons School (USAFWS) Integration, November 2020.

On 1 January 2020, the squadron was redesignated from Airborne Early Warning Squadron 117 to Airborne Command and Control Squadron 117 along with the other 9 United States Navy E-2C/D squadrons to reflect the expanded role and responsibilities of the aircraft outside its original AEW focus. Later in 2020, VAW-117 transitioned from the E-2C to the E-2D Advanced Hawkeye.

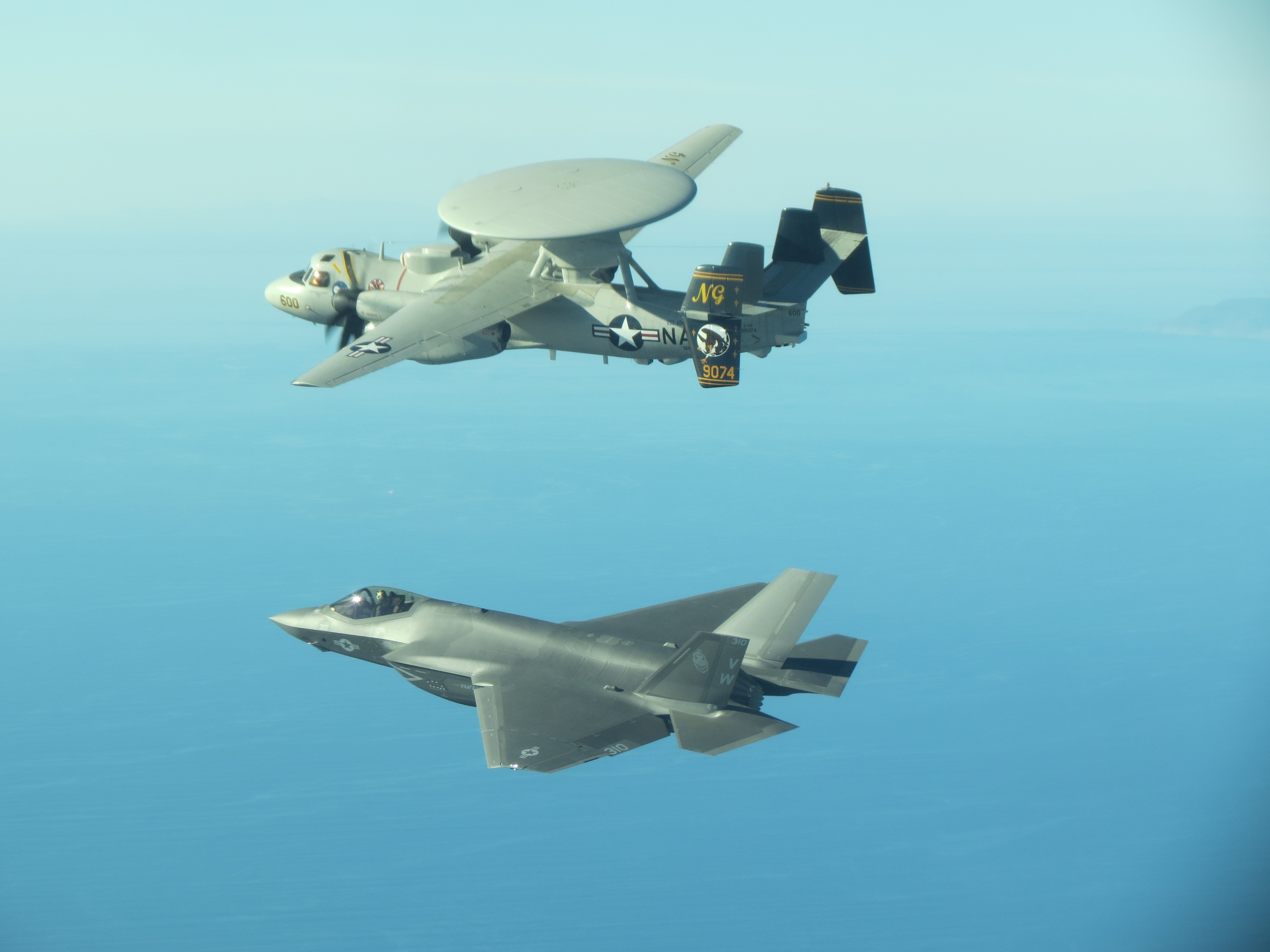
A VAW-117 E-2D Hawkeye in flight with a F-35C of VMFA-314, January 2021.

In late Feb 2026, as part of CVW 9, VAW-117 and their E-2Ds operating off the USS Abraham Lincoln, undertook combat sorties within Operation Epic Fury against Iran.

== See also ==
- History of the United States Navy
- List of United States Navy aircraft squadrons
