= USS Chafee =

Arleigh Burke–class destroyer

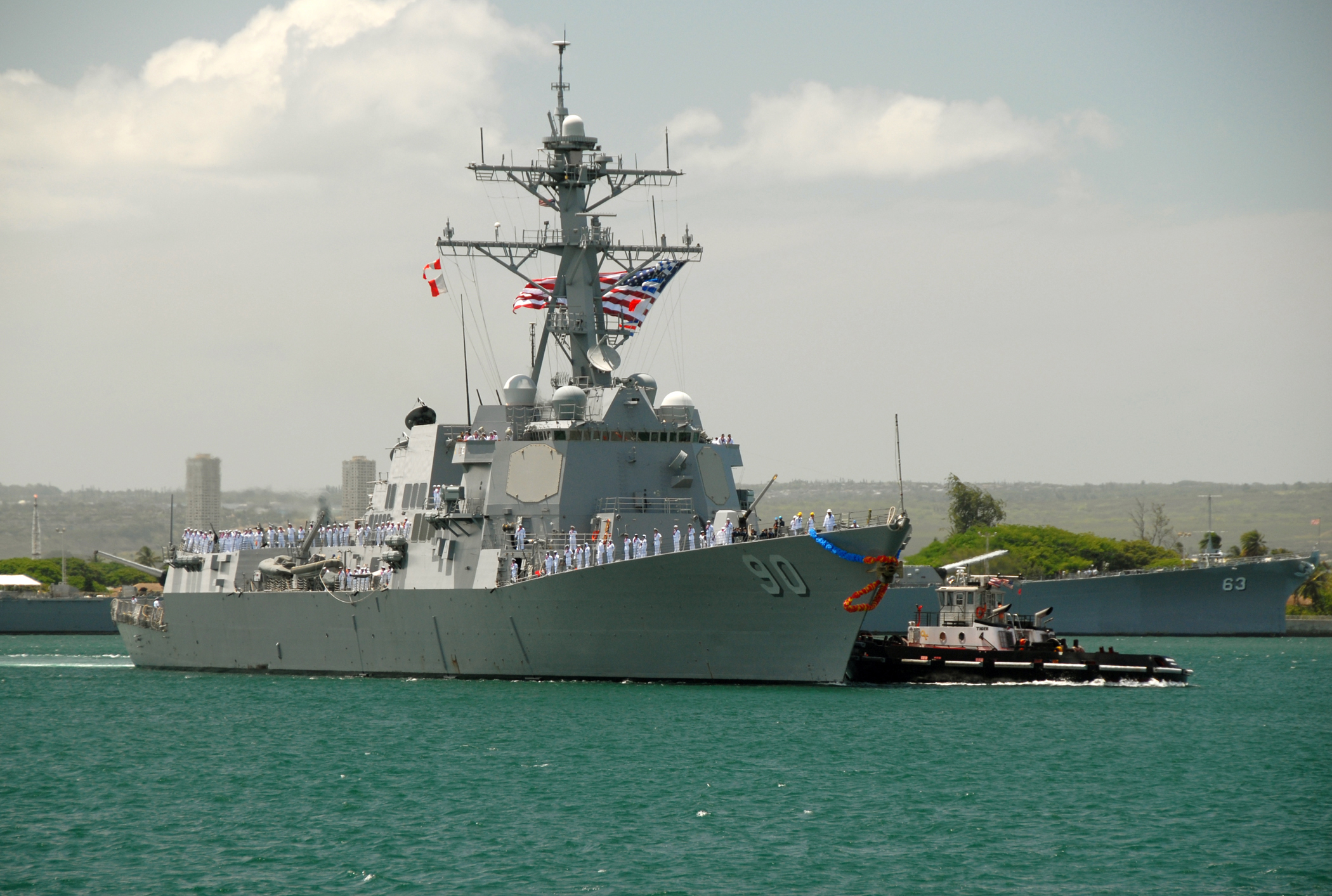
- USS Chafee on 7 June 2008

History

United States
- Name: Chafee
- Namesake: John Chafee
- Ordered: 6 March 1998
- Builder: Bath Iron Works
- Laid down: 12 April 2001
- Launched: 2 November 2002
- Commissioned: 18 October 2003
- Home port: Naval Station San Diego
- Identification: MMSI number: 369933000; Callsign: NJHC; Hull number: DDG-90
- Motto: Commanding the Seas
- Honors and awards: See Awards
- Status: in active service
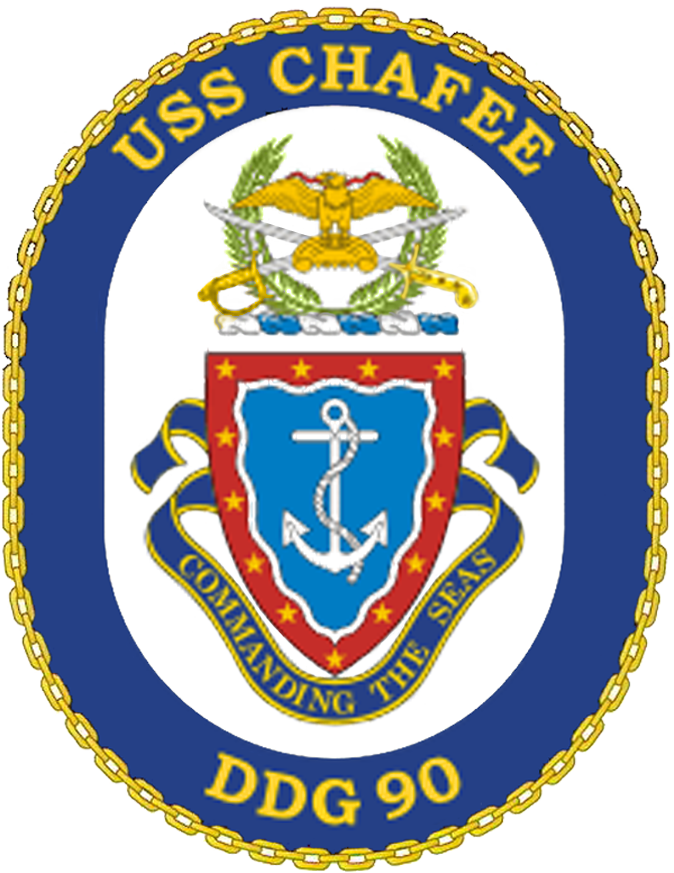
- Badge

General characteristics
- Class & type: Arleigh Burke-class destroyer
- Displacement: 9,200 long tons (9,300 t)
- Length: 509 ft 6 in (155.30 m)
- Beam: 66 ft (20 m)
- Draft: 31 ft (9.4 m)
- Propulsion: 4 × General Electric LM2500-30 gas turbines, 2 shafts, 100,000 shp (75 MW)
- Speed: >30 kn (56 km/h; 35 mph)
- Complement: 350 officers and enlisted
- Armament: Guns: 1 × 5-inch (127 mm)/62 Mk 45 Mod 4 (lightweight gun); 1 × 20 mm (0.8 in) Phalanx CIWS; 2 × 25 mm (0.98 in) Mk 38 machine gun system; 4 × 0.50 in (12.7 mm) caliber guns; Missiles: 1 × 32-cell, 1 × 64-cell (96 total cells) Mk 41 vertical launching system (VLS): RIM-66M surface-to-air missile; RIM-156 surface-to-air missile; RIM-174A Standard ERAM; RIM-161 anti-ballistic missile; RIM-162 ESSM (quad-packed); BGM-109 Tomahawk cruise missile; RUM-139 vertical launch ASROC; Torpedoes: 2 × Mark 32 triple torpedo tubes: Mark 46 lightweight torpedo; Mark 50 lightweight torpedo; Mark 54 lightweight torpedo
- Aircraft carried: 2 × MH-60R Seahawk helicopters

USS Chafee (DDG-90) is an Arleigh Burke-class (Flight IIA) Aegis guided missile destroyer in United States Navy. She is named for Senator John Lester Hubbard Chafee (1922–1999), a Marine veteran of Guadalcanal who also served as the Secretary of the Navy. Chafee was laid down by the Bath Iron Works in Bath, Maine on 12 April 2001, launched on 2 November 2002 and commissioned on 18 October 2003 in Newport, Rhode Island, the home state of the ship's namesake.

== Service history ==
Chafee left her homeport of Pearl Harbor 20 May 2005 for her maiden deployment with the Nimitz Carrier Strike Group (CSG). She returned to her homeport after a regularly scheduled deployment in support of the Global War on Terrorism.

Chafee departed Pearl Harbor 9 April 2007, as part of the San Diego–based Nimitz CSG and deployed to the U.S 5th Fleet (C5F) area of operations. On 1 June 2007, Chafee fired her main gun at Al-Qaeda suspects in the Puntland region of Somalia. The men were wanted for the 1998 United States embassy bombings. Chafee returned home to Pearl Harbor on 22 September 2007, marking the end a successful 167-day Western Pacific and Middle East deployment.

Chafee is an active unit of the Pacific Fleet and operates out of Naval Station San Diego, California; currently, Chafee is assigned to the Nimitz carrier group.

On 10 December 2020, It was reported that Chafee tested the Tomahawk Block V missile for the first time.

Chafee participated in RIMPAC 2022.

== Awards ==
- COMNAVSURFPAC Intelligence Excellence Award (2021)
- Navy Meritorious Unit Commendation (May–Jun 2007, Apr 2012 – Dec 2013)
- Battle "E" (2007, 2012, 2013, 2014, 2015)
- Spokane Trophy Award (2006)
- Secretary of the Navy (SECNAV) Energy Conservation Award (Afloat category) (2015)
- Chief of Naval Operations (CNO) Ship-Helicopter Safety Award – (2015)

== In popular culture ==
The construction of USS Chafee and USS Momsen, from initial steel cutting to sea trials, was documented in the Discovery Channel television special Destroyer: Forged in Steel. The destroyers were not referenced by name, but their numbers were visible on their bows.

== Coat of arms ==
=== Shield ===
A white anchor on a background of blue surrounded by a thin wavy white border, and then surrounded by a red border that is marked with thirteen gold stars.

The anchor—at the center of the shield—is borrowed from the Secretary of the Navy's Flag, in reference to John Chafee's time in that position. The thirteen stars is a reference to Rhode Island, Chafee's home state. The wavy border symbolizes the sea and Navy. The color white represents integrity. Blue and gold are the traditional colors of the navy, and the colors denote the sea the excellence, respectively. While the color red denotes courage.

=== Crest ===
In gold, an eagle is holding a red serpent with its beak. The eagle is clutching arrows with its talons, and it is perched on a representation of the Senate Chamber of the Capitol Building. Behind the eagle, a Naval Officer's sword and a Marine Corps mameluke in saltire points upwards. A laurel wreath serves as a back ground and encircles the eagle. The base of the crest is a blue and white decorative rope.

The two swords signify Chafee's military service in two wars, specifically the mameluke symbolizes his time in the Marine Corps. The laurel wreath is a symbol Chafee's honor and achievement during his time as a marine, Secretary of the Navy, senator and governor. The eagle is a reference to the senator's time as the Secretary of the Navy. As mentioned before, the color gold and red represents excellence and courage, respectively.

=== Motto ===
Commanding the Seas.

=== Seal ===
The coat of arms is the shield that topped with the crest. The coat of arms is then placed on a white background, and is surrounded by a dark blue oval that is bordered by a gold chain. The ship's name is inscribed at the top of the oval, and the hull number is inscribed at the bottom.
