= USS Momsen =

2003 Arleigh Burke-class destroyer

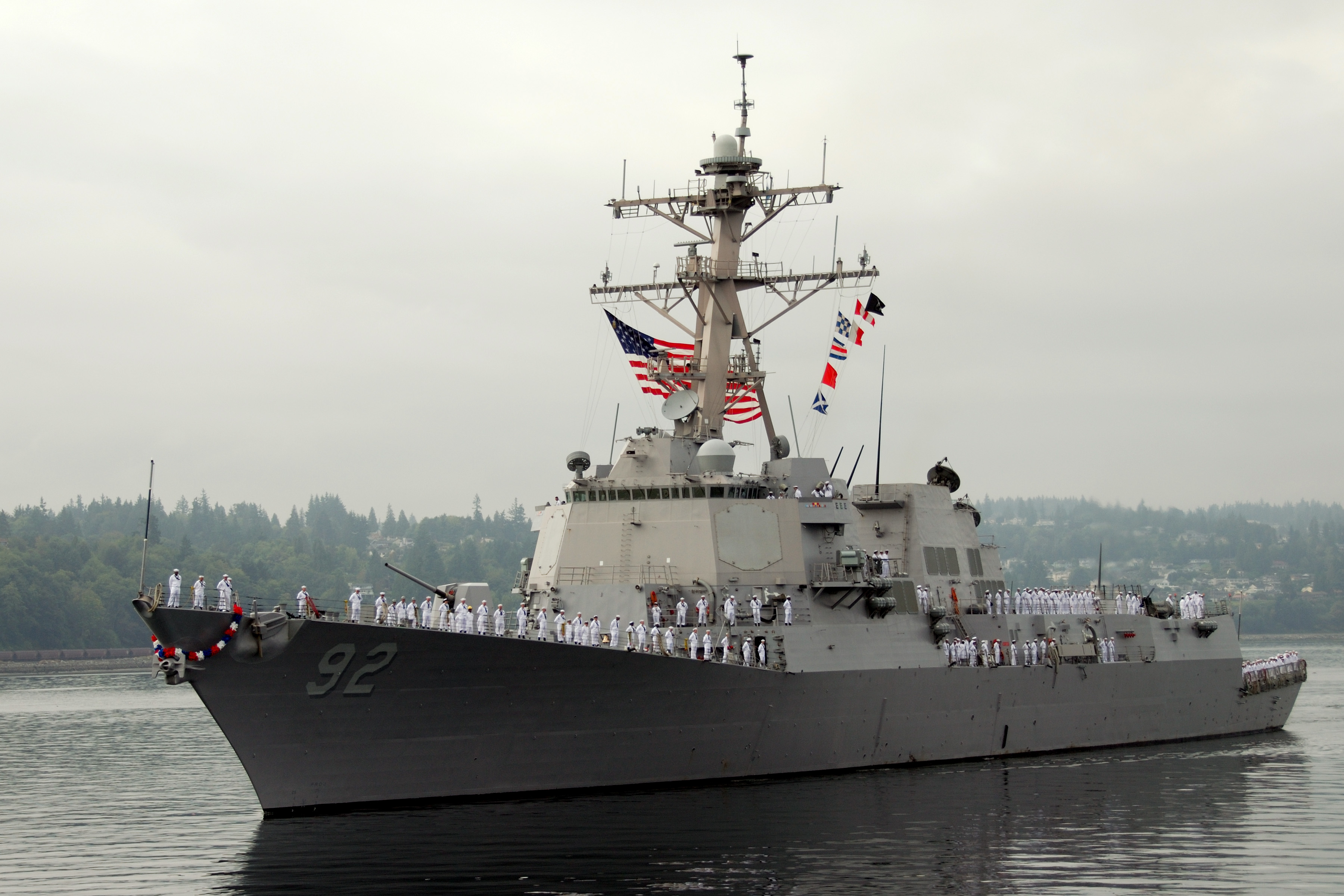
- USS Momsen in 2006

History

United States
- Name: Momsen
- Namesake: Charles Momsen
- Ordered: 6 March 1998
- Builder: Bath Iron Works
- Laid down: 16 November 2001
- Launched: 19 July 2003
- Christened: 9 August 2003
- Commissioned: 28 August 2004
- Home port: San Diego
- Identification: MMSI number: 369950000; Callsign: NSWD; Hull number: DDG-92
- Motto: Rise Above
- Honours and awards: See Awards
- Status: in active service
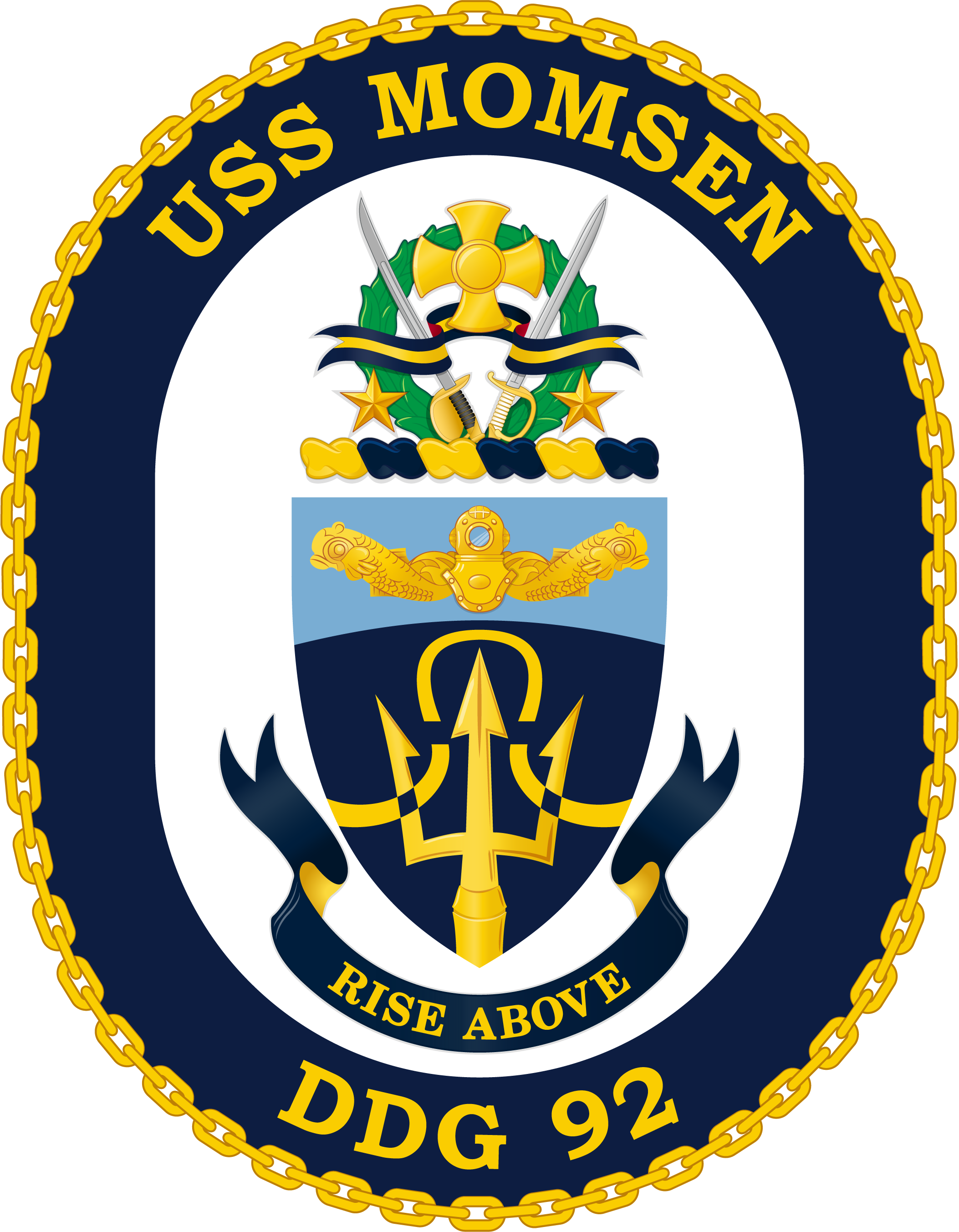
- Badge

General characteristics
- Class & type: Arleigh Burke-class destroyer
- Displacement: 9,200 long tons (9,300 t)
- Length: 509 ft 6 in (155.30 m)
- Beam: 66 ft (20 m)
- Draught: 31 ft (9.4 m)
- Propulsion: 4 × General Electric LM2500-30 gas turbines, 2 shafts, 100,000 shp (75 MW)
- Speed: >30 knots (56 km/h; 35 mph)
- Complement: 280 officers and enlisted men
- Armament: Guns: 1 × 5-inch (127 mm)/62 Mk 45 Mod 4 (lightweight gun); 1 × 20 mm (0.8 in) Phalanx CIWS; 2 × 25 mm (0.98 in) Mk 38 machine gun system; 4 × 0.50 in (12.7 mm) caliber guns; Missiles: 1 × 32-cell, 1 × 64-cell (96 total cells) Mk 41 vertical launching system (VLS): RIM-66M surface-to-air missile; RIM-156 surface-to-air missile; RIM-174A Standard ERAM; RIM-161 anti-ballistic missile; RIM-162 ESSM (quad-packed); BGM-109 Tomahawk cruise missile; RUM-139 vertical launch ASROC; Torpedoes: 2 × Mark 32 triple torpedo tubes: Mark 46 lightweight torpedo; Mark 50 lightweight torpedo; Mark 54 lightweight torpedo
- Aircraft carried: 2 × MH-60R Seahawk helicopters

USS Momsen (DDG-92) is an Arleigh Burke-class (Flight IIA) Aegis guided missile destroyer in service with the United States Navy. Momsen is the 26th destroyer of the Arleigh Burke class to be built by Bath Iron Works. She is named after Vice Admiral Charles B. "Swede" Momsen of Flushing, Queens, New York (1896–1967). Vice Admiral Momsen made many contributions to the navy such as the invention of the Momsen Lung when he was assigned to the Bureau of Construction and Repair. Momsen was also involved in the first successful rescue of a crew of a sunken submarine, USS Squalus, and subsequently supervised the salvage of the boat.

Momsen's keel was laid on 16 November 2001. She was launched on 19 July 2003, sponsored by Admiral Momsen's daughter, Evelyn Momsen Hailey. Momsen was commissioned on 28 August 2004, at Panama City, Florida.

The construction of Momsen and sister ship Chafee, from initial steelcutting to sea trials, was documented on the Discovery Channel television special Destroyer: Forged in Steel. The destroyers were not referenced by name, but their numbers were visible on their prows. As of 2022, Momsen is serving in the Pacific Fleet, homeported in Naval Base San Diego, and recently assigned to Destroyer Squadron 31 based at Pearl Harbor, Hawaii.

== Service history ==
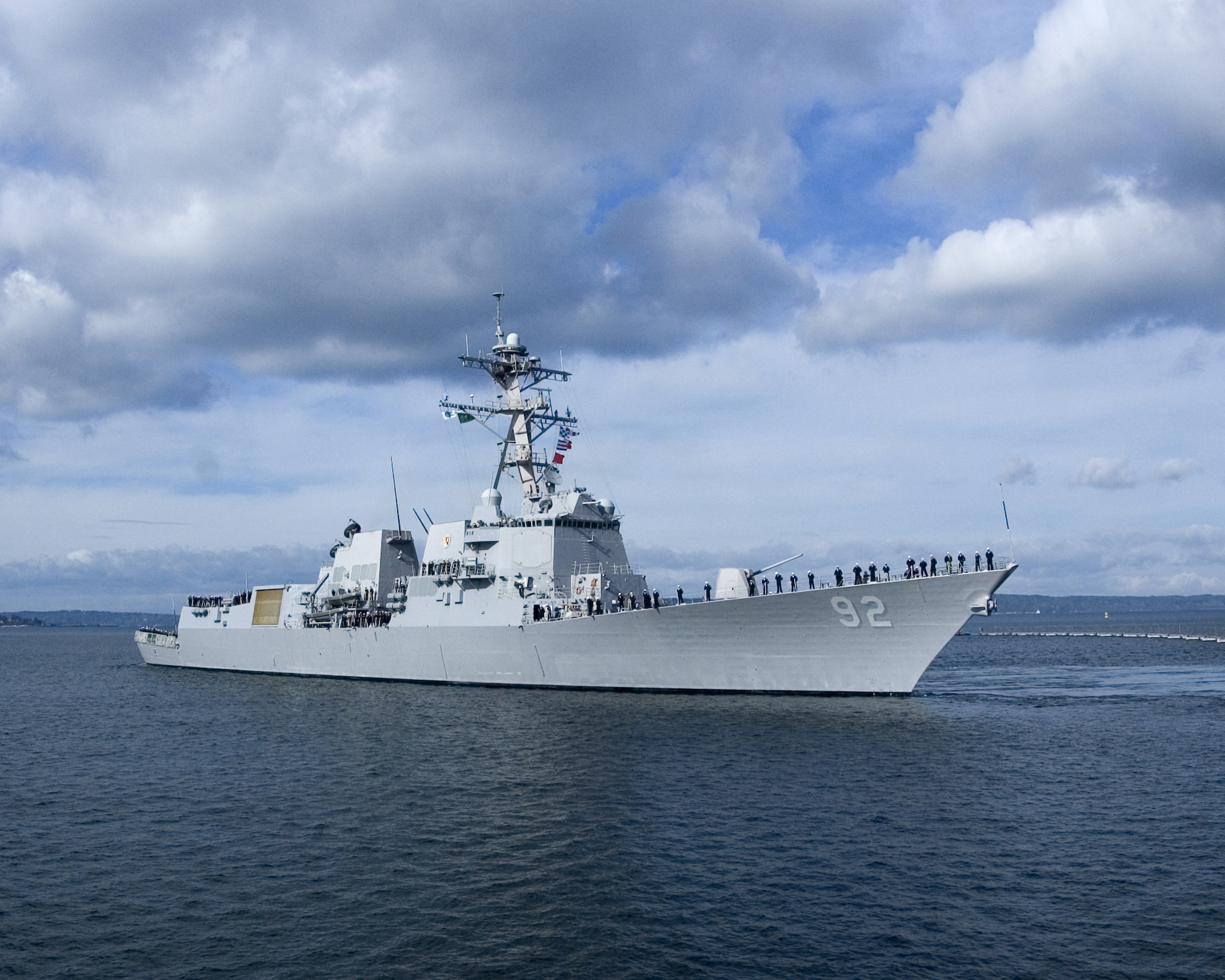
Momsen starboard bow view

=== 2006 ===
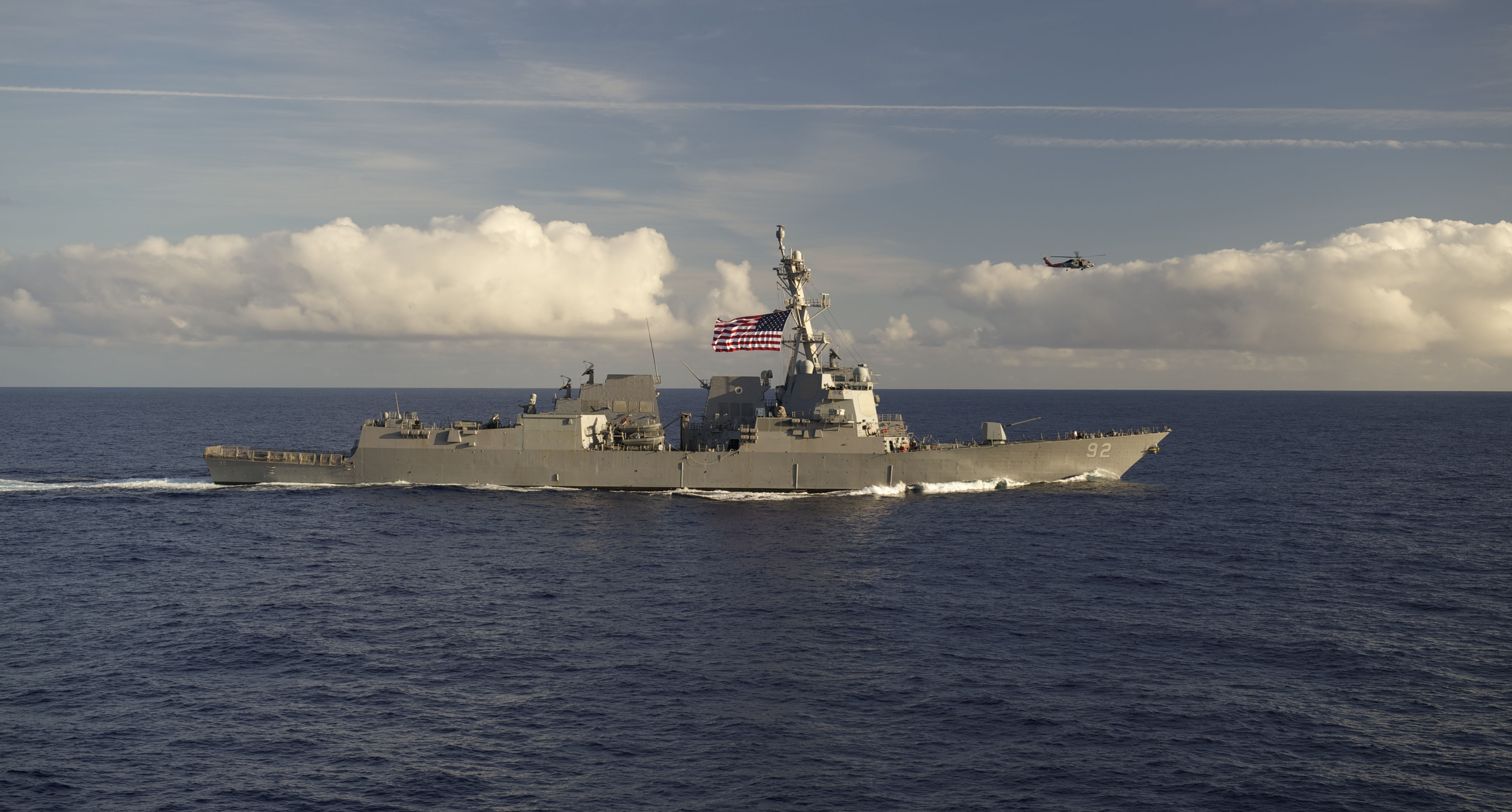
Momsen transits the Pacific Ocean

On 6 April 2006, Momsen departed Naval Station Everett for her maiden deployment. During the six-month cruise, the ship conducted training and operations throughout Southeast Asia and the Western Pacific in the U.S. 7th Fleet area of responsibility. Momsen returned home from a successful maiden deployment on 22 September 2006.

=== 2008 ===
Momsen departed for her second deployment on 14 March 2008 with Carrier Strike Group Nine. During her deployment, Momsen provided critical humanitarian assistance for two foreign vessels, a stranded cargo vessel with engine problems and a former hijacked merchant vessel requiring food, water and medical attention. She returned home on 13 October 2008 after a seven-month underway period.

=== 2010-2011 ===
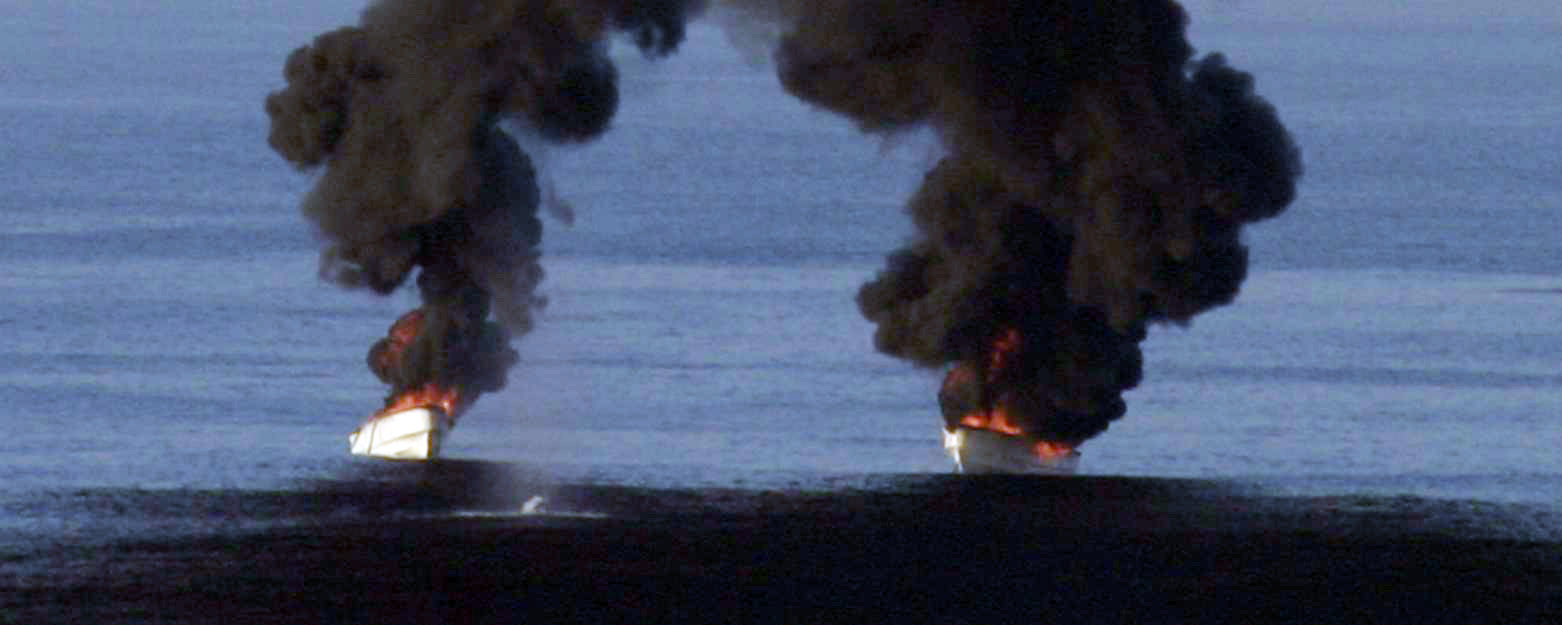
Anti-piracy operations in the Gulf of Oman, February 2011

Momsen departed for her third deployment September 2010 with Carrier Strike Group Nine.

On 2 February 2011, Momsen, with the guided-missile cruiser Bunker Hill, responded to a distress call from the Panamanian-flag merchant vessel Duqm in the Gulf of Oman. Both ships disrupted a pirate attack on Duqm, tracked the two pirate skiffs back to their mothership, and destroyed the two skiffs to prevent their use in future pirate attacks (pictured).

==== Controversy ====
The ship's skipper, Commander Jay Wylie, was relieved of command on 27 April 2011 for "loss of confidence in his ability to command." On 28 October 2011 Wylie pleaded guilty to sexual assault and rape, and was sentenced by court martial to 42 months imprisonment and loss of all navy benefits.

=== 2013 ===
During her 2013 deployment, Momsen initially joined Carrier Strike Group Eleven before undertaking independent operations with the U.S. Seventh Fleet. During this deployment, Momsen participated in such multilateral naval exercises as CARAT Indonesia 2013 in the Java Sea, Talisman Sabre 2013 in the Coral Sea, and SAREX in the Sea of Japan. Momsen operated with Carrier Strike Group Five during the Talisman Sabre and SAREX exercises. Momsen also paid port visits to Indonesia, Japan, Saipan, Australia. On 22 August 2013, Momsen returned to Naval Station Everett, Washington, after a four-month underway period as part of the U.S. Seventh Fleet.

=== 2018 ===
In 2018, Momsen made a port call to Anchorage.

=== 2022 ===
In February 2022, the Momsen departed Everett to begin a pan-Pacific deployment. 23 April 2022, Momsen made a port call to Goa.

On November 29, 2022 a webcam overlooking San Diego Bay captured an apparent near collision between U.S. warships whose crews had to deploy evasive maneuvers. In the footage, crewmen from both ships are heard informing each other that they veering to port, or left, to eliminate the threat of a collision. The Navy, however, is investigating Tuesday’s incident involving the guided-missile destroyer, Momsen, and the landing ship Harpers Ferry, according to the Navy Times.

=== 2023 ===
Momsen made a port call to Homer, Alaska on 3-4 May. Local residents were given a tour of the ship while she was berthed at the local Deepwater Dock.

On September 1, 2023, USS Momsen homeport shifted from Naval Station Everett to Naval Base San Diego after being in the Pacific North West for more than 20 years.

=== Awards ===
- Navy Unit Commendation – (Apr – Sep 2008, Sep 2010 – Mar 2011, Dec 2011 – Aug 2012)
- Battle "E" – (2008, 2013)
- Secretary of the Navy (SECNAV) Energy Conservation Award (Environmental Quality, Small Ship category) – (2010, 2012)
