= William Monson =

William Monson may refer to:

- William L. Monson, American cable television businessman
- William Monson (Royal Navy officer) (1569–1643), English admiral
- Sir William Monson, 4th Baronet (1653–1727), English politician
- William Monson, 1st Viscount Monson (died c. 1673), one of the Regicides of King Charles I of England
- William Monson (British Army officer) (1760–1807), soldier and politician
- William Monson, 1st Viscount Oxenbridge (1829–1898), Baron in the Peerage of Great Britain
