= Gabriel Monsen =

Norwegian politician

Gabriel Monsen (15 November 1798 – 1 July 1882) was a Norwegian politician.

He was elected to the Norwegian Parliament in 1842, 1845, and 1848, representing the rural constituency of Stavanger Amt (today named Rogaland); he was also deputy representative in 1851 and 1854. He worked as a farmer.

Monsen hailed from Håland, and was mayor of that municipality in the years 1837-1841, 1846-1849, 1854-1855, and 1860-1879. He often alternated serving in this position with vicar Nils Christopher Bøckmann. Monsen also served as deputy mayor for two years.
