= Richard Paul Momsen =

American diplomat (1891–1965)

Richard Paul Momsen (1891 – 1965) in Rio de Janeiro, Brazil) was an American/Brazilian lawyer who served as Consul General for the United States in Rio de Janeiro (1918–1919) and founder of the American Chambers of Commerce for Brazil.

== Early life ==
Momsen was born in Milwaukee, Wisconsin in 1891. He was the second son of William Momsen, a native of Wisconsin, and Mary Momsen, a German immigrant. He received his LLB degree from George Washington University Law School in 1912, and in 1913 traveled to Brazil in the service of the American consulate.

== Career ==
While serving in this American consulate, in 1916 Momsen helped found the American Chamber of Commerce in Brazil. In this capacity, Momsen argued for the reduction of taxation of foreign investment groups in Brazil.

Momsen furthered his education while in Brazil, graduating from the faculty of legal and social sciences in 1917, being admitted to practice law in Brazil. Upon the death of his predecessor, Alfred Gottschalk, in 1918, Momsen assumed the post of Consul-General in Rio de Janeiro.

Upon leaving his post in 1919, Momsen went on to found two separate law firms: one in Rio de Janeiro in partnership with Edmundo Miranda Jordan and Pedro Americo Werneck, another in New York with Leslie E. Freeman. In 1926 he founded another firm, this in the city of São Paulo, named Momsen & Bastos. Subsequently, the Rio de Janeiro firm was divided into two major segments: an intellectual property firm in partnership with Simeon W. Harris and a general law firm in partnership with Raja Gabaglia, Monteiro de Barros and Fernando Velloso. The original legal firm founded by Richard Momsen is considered the first legal firm established in Brazil adopting a corporate structure.

The intellectual property firm Momsen & Harris was joined by Thomas Othon Leonardos in 1927. After the death of Simeon W. Harris, on April 3, 1944, the firm adopted the name of Momsen, Leonardos & Cia.

== Personal ==
Momsen was married in 1921 to Dorothea Harnecker. Together, they had four children (Richard Jr., Alicia, William and Beatrice). He died in 1965 in Rio de Janeiro, Brazil.

== Legacy ==
A scholarship at George Washington University Law School was established in 1964 by the law firm Momsen, Leonardos & Cia and the estate of Richard P. Momsen, to support Brazilian law students or law graduates to study U.S. law. Richard Momsen and Dorothea Harnecker Momsen deeded the Momsen Preserve in Cross River, New York as protected land.
