= USS Patuxent =

USS Patuxent or USNS Patuxent is a name used more than once by the U.S. Navy:

- USS Patuxent (AT-11), sea-going tugboat in commission from 1909 to 1924
- USS Patuxent (AO-44), an oiler in commission from 1942 to 1946
- USNS Patuxent (T-AO-201), a fleet replenishment oiler in service since 1995.
