= Mom Song =

Mom Song can refer to:

- "Mom Song", a track on the album Simply Mortified by BS 2000
- "Mom's Overture", an unofficial title of the song "Momisms" by comedian Anita Renfroe

== See also ==
- Mom (disambiguation), for several songs titled "Mom"
