= General Nicholson =

General Nicholson may refer to:

- Cameron Nicholson (1898–1979), British Army general
- Francis Nicholson (1655–1727]), British Army lieutenant general
- John Nicholson (East India Company officer) (1822–1857), East India Company brigadier general
- John W. Nicholson Jr. (born 1957), U.S. Army four-star general
- John Sanctuary Nicholson (1863–1924), British Expeditionary Force brigadier general
- John W. Nicholson (born c. 1934), U.S. Army brigadier general
- Lawrence D. Nicholson (born 1956), U.S. Marine Corps lieutenant general
- Lothian Nicholson (British Army officer, died 1933) (1865–1933), British Army major general
- Lothian Nicholson (1827–1893), British Army lieutenant general
- William Jones Nicholson (1856–1931), U.S. Army brigadier general
- William L. Nicholson (1926–2020), U.S. Air Force major general
- William Nicholson, 1st Baron Nicholson (1845–1918), British Army general
