= Randy Reeves =

American Navy officer and government official (born 1962)

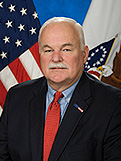

Under Secretary of Veterans Affairs for Memorial Affairs
- In office December 12, 2017 – January 20, 2021
- President: Donald Trump
- Preceded by: Steve L. Muro
- Succeeded by: Ronald E. Walters (acting); Matthew T. Quinn

Personal details
- Born: 1962 (age 63–64) Little Rock, Mississippi, U.S.
- Spouse: Katy
- Children: 4
- Education: Community College of the Air Force (AS); Peru State College (BS); Touro University (MS)

Military service
- Allegiance: United States
- Branch/service: United States Air Force; United States Navy
- Years of service: 1980-2008
- Rank: Staff Sergeant (USAF); Commander (USN)
- Battles/wars: Gulf War; Iraq War; Operation Enduring Freedom

Randy C. Reeves is an American military officer and government official who served as the Under Secretary of Veterans Affairs for Memorial Affairs from 2017 to 2021. He served in the military for 27 years and is a veteran of the Gulf War, Iraq War, and Operation Enduring Freedom. Prior to assuming his current role, he was the executive director of the Mississippi Veterans Affairs Board and president of the National Association of State Directors of Veterans Affairs. He left office on January 20, 2021.

== Early life and education ==
Reeves was born in 1962 in Little Rock, Mississippi. He is a 1980 graduate of Beulah Hubbard High School. He earned an associate degree from the Community College of the Air Force, a Bachelor of Science in management from Peru State College, and a Master of Science in health science from Touro University. Reeves also completed the senior executive program at Harvard University.

== Career ==
After high school, he joined the United States Air Force, serving as an airman from 1980 to 1988. He subsequently served as an officer in the United States Navy, serving as a surface warfare officer until retiring as a commander in August 2008. Reeves served during the Gulf War and in military operations in Kosovo, Haiti, and Lebanon.

In January 2009, Reeves became the first director of the Mississippi Veterans Memorial Cemetery. Later that same year, he was appointed deputy director of the Mississippi Veterans Affairs Board (VAB). In January 2012, Reeves became the executive director of VAB. In October 2015, he was named to a three-year term on the Veterans Rural Health Advisory Committee. Reeves was elected president of the National Association of State Directors of Veterans Affairs in August 2016.

On September 2, 2017, President Donald Trump nominated Reeves to become the next Under Secretary of Veterans Affairs for Memorial Affairs. The nomination was confirmed by the U.S. Senate on November 8, 2017.
