= USS Higgins =

Arleigh Burke-class destroyer

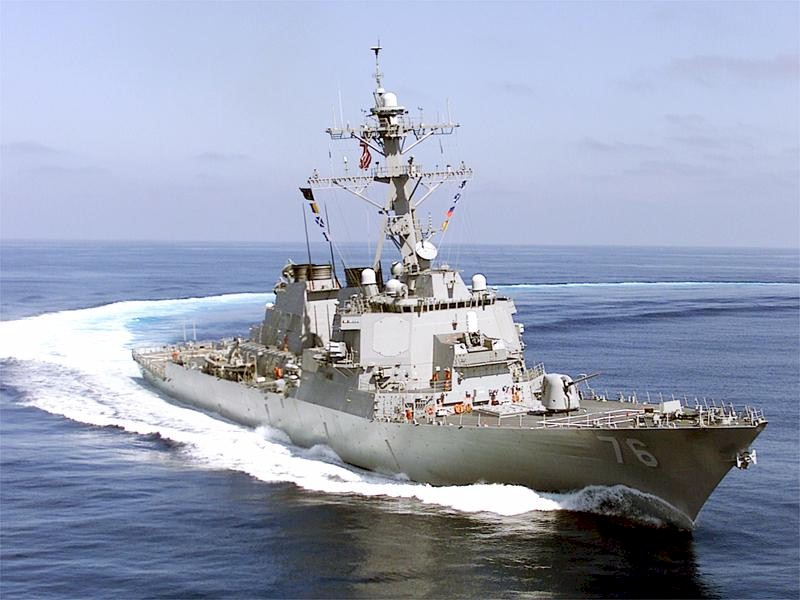
- USS Higgins (DDG-76), on 16 June 2001

History

United States
- Name: Higgins
- Namesake: William R. Higgins
- Ordered: 19 January 1993
- Builder: Bath Iron Works
- Laid down: 14 November 1996
- Launched: 4 October 1997
- Acquired: 14 January 1999
- Commissioned: 24 April 1999
- Home port: Yokosuka, Japan
- Identification: MMSI number: 368870000; Callsign: NMEG; Hull number: DDG-76
- Motto: First to Fight
- Honours and awards: See Awards
- Status: in active service
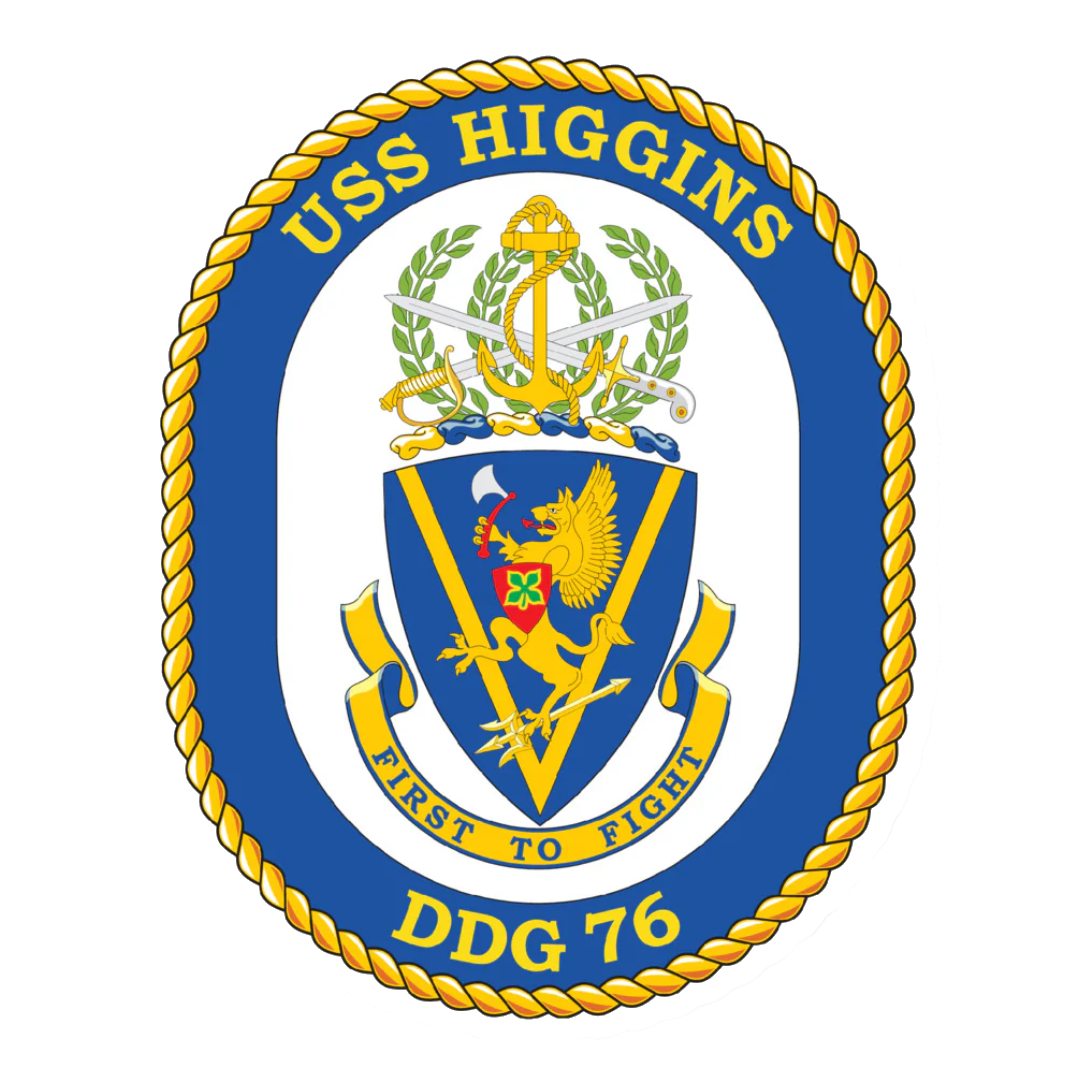
- Badge

General characteristics
- Class & type: Arleigh Burke-class destroyer
- Displacement: 8,637 long tons (8,776 t) (Full load)
- Length: 505 ft (154 m)
- Beam: 59 ft (18 m)
- Draft: 31 ft (9.4 m)
- Installed power: 4 × General Electric LM2500-30 gas turbines; 100,000 shp (75,000 kW)
- Propulsion: 2 × shafts
- Speed: In excess of 30 kn (56 km/h; 35 mph)
- Range: 4,400 nmi (8,100 km; 5,100 mi) at 20 kn (37 km/h; 23 mph)
- Complement: 33 commissioned officers; 38 chief petty officers; 210 enlisted personnel
- Sensors & processing systems: AN/SPY-1D PESA 3D radar (Flight I, II, IIA); AN/SPY-6(V)1 AESA 3D radar (Flight III); AN/SPS-67(V)3 or (V)5 surface search radar (DDG-51 – DDG-118); AN/SPQ-9B surface search radar (DDG-119 onward); AN/SPS-73(V)12 surface search/navigation radar (DDG-51 – DDG-86); BridgeMaster E surface search/navigation radar (DDG-87 onward); 3 × AN/SPG-62 fire-control radar; Mk 46 optical sight system (Flight I, II, IIA); Mk 20 electro-optical sight system (Flight III); AN/SQQ-89 ASW combat system: AN/SQS-53C sonar array; AN/SQR-19 tactical towed array sonar (Flight I, II, IIA); TB-37U multi-function towed array sonar (DDG-113 onward); AN/SQQ-28 LAMPS III shipboard system
- Electronic warfare & decoys: AN/SLQ-32 electronic warfare suite; AN/SLQ-25 Nixie torpedo countermeasures; Mk 36 Mod 12 decoy launching systems; Mk 53 Nulka decoy launching systems; Mk 59 decoy launching systems
- Armament: Guns: 1 × 5-inch (127 mm)/54 mk 45 mod 1/2 (lightweight gun); 2 × 20 mm (0.8 in) Phalanx CIWS; 2 × 25 mm (0.98 in) Mk 38 machine gun system; 4 × 0.50 inches (12.7 mm) caliber guns; Missiles: 2 × Mk 141 Harpoon anti-ship missile launcher; 1 × 29-cell, 1 × 61-cell (90 total cells) Mk 41 vertical launching system (VLS): RIM-66M surface-to-air missile; RIM-156 surface-to-air missile; RIM-161 anti-ballistic missile; BGM-109 Tomahawk cruise missile; RUM-139 vertical launch ASROC; Torpedoes: 2 × Mark 32 triple torpedo tubes: Mark 46 lightweight torpedo; Mark 50 lightweight torpedo; Mark 54 lightweight torpedo
- Aircraft carried: 1 × Sikorsky MH-60R

USS Higgins (DDG-76) is an Arleigh Burke-class (Flight II) Aegis guided missile destroyer of the United States Navy. She is the 15th of the class to be built by Bath Iron Works of Bath, Maine. Construction began on 14 November 1996 and she was launched and christened on 4 October 1997. She was commissioned at a ceremony in Port Everglades, Florida on 24 April 1999. She is part of Destroyer Squadron 15 within the Seventh Fleet, and is homeported at United States Fleet Activities Yokosuka in Yokosuka, Japan.

== Namesake ==
She is named for William R. Higgins, a colonel in the U.S. Marine Corps, who was captured, tortured and murdered in 1988 by Hezbollah, during a UN peacekeeping mission to Lebanon. In 1992 he was posthumously awarded the Presidential Citizens Medal, and two years later it was announced that a ship would be named in his honor.

== History ==
Higgins was built by Bath Iron Works in Bath, Maine. The ship was christened on 1 October 1997 by the wife of Colonel Higgins, Lieutenant Colonel Robin L. Higgins, USMC (retired), who is also the ship's sponsor. "In the name of all that is good and right in the world - Semper Fi - Always Faithful - I christen thee HIGGINS".

On 16 August 1999, Higgins conducted spotter services off San Clemente Island. The following day, Higgins shot her first FIREX and earned 105.92, the highest score on the range that year. Higgins's score later proved enough to win the Chezek Award for Excellence in Naval Gunnery (the "Top Gun" award), which Vice Admiral Edward Moore Jr. presented to the crew in October.

After a port visit in Hong Kong during her maiden deployment, Higgins was the first ship off the coast for the Hainan Island incident that occurred on 1 April 2001, when a United States Navy EP-3E ARIES II signals intelligence aircraft and a People's Liberation Army Navy (PLAN) J-8II interceptor fighter jet collided in mid-air, resulting in an international dispute between the United States and the People's Republic of China.

Upon returning to San Diego in April 2004, Higgins completed a safe and efficient ordnance offload and fuel transfer and headed into a nine-week Selected Restricted Availability. This time in the shipyard enhanced Higgins's capabilities including the installation of the Tactical Tomahawk weapons system, the refurbishment of the Mk 45/5-inch Lightweight Gun Mount and Mk 41 Vertical Launch systems, and an enhanced Combat Systems suite. December 2004 marked the beginning of a busy upcoming year for Higgins. She became a member of the USS Nimitz Carrier Strike Group, in the company of Nimitz, the cruiser Princeton, the destroyer Chafee, and the submarine Louisville. In the three-week Composite Unit Exercise that followed, Higgins stood out in all mission areas and, along with the other ships in the Nimitz Strike Group, was now certified "surge ready" to deploy.

In February 2005, the ship conducted the Congressionally-mandated inspection by the Board of Inspection and Survey (INSURV). This complete material assessment of the ship was successfully completed and was highlighted by a one-day underway demonstration which showcased Higgins's levels of combat readiness with near-perfect grades in nearly every category. The next pre-deployment milestone consisted of Higgins's ordnance onload at Naval Weapons Station Seal Beach. Once the ship was outfitted with her deployment load of ammunition, Higgins was once again underway with the Nimitz Strike Group in March for a Joint Task Force Exercise. Coincident with that two-week exercise, Higgins sent three teams to the recently instituted Non-Compliant Visit, Board, Search, and Seizure School and, as a result, became one of the first ships to deploy to the Fifth Fleet area of responsibility with an organic non-compliant boarding capability, enhancing her effectiveness in waging the global war on terrorism.

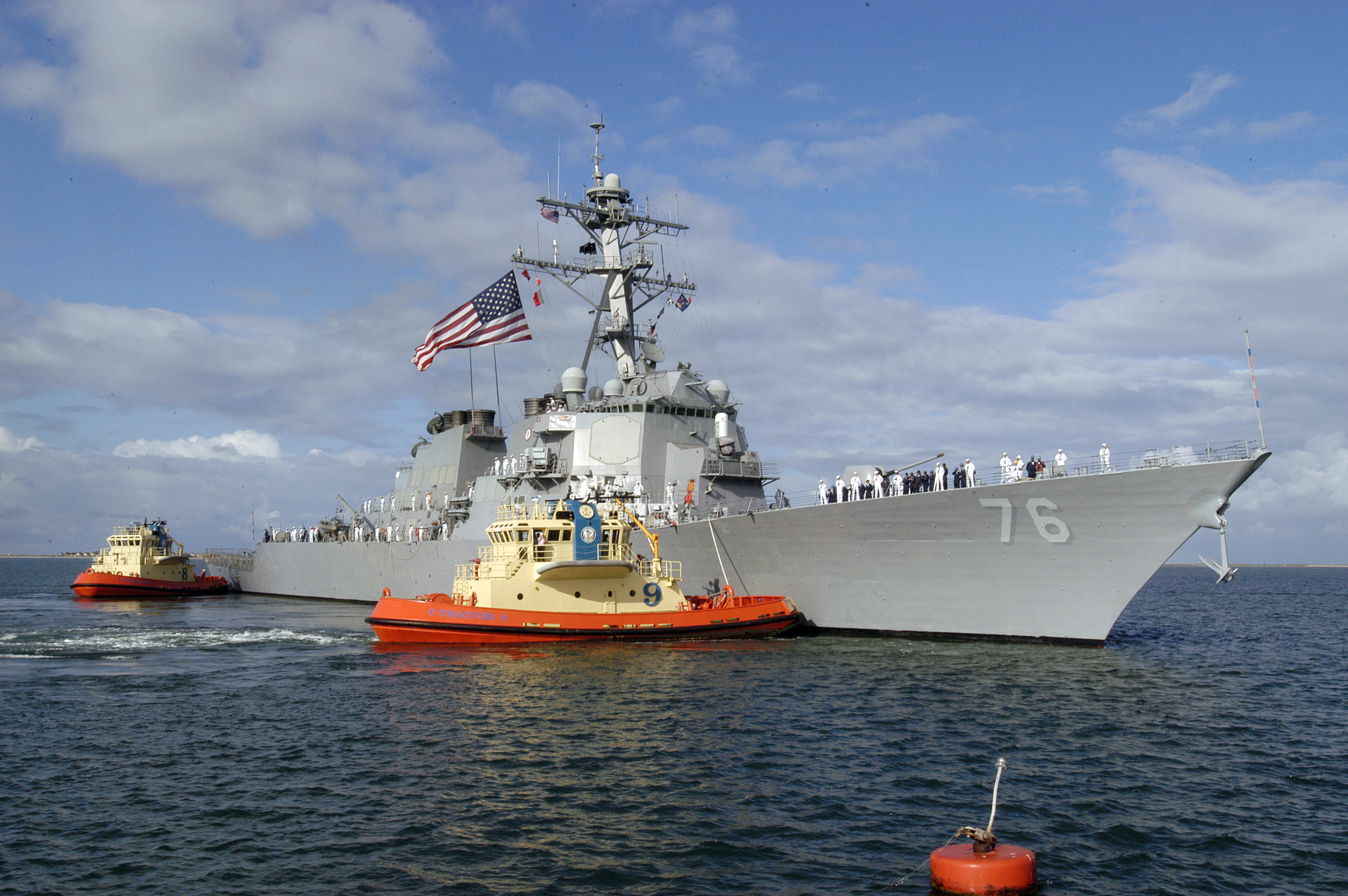
Higgins underway, 6 May 2005.

Thirteen months since the previous deployment, Higgins commenced a second deployment on 6 May 2005 in company with the Nimitz Strike Group. A brief stop at the North Island Naval Weapons Station provided Higgins with several new combat capabilities, particularly the new Tactical Tomahawk Cruise Missiles and the High Explosive Electronically Timed (HE-ET) and Kinetic Energy Electronically Timed (KE-ET) 5-inch projectiles. While the TACTOM missiles significantly enhance Higgins's Strike warfare capabilities, the HE-ET and KE-ET rounds provide the ship more capable defense against an asymmetric surface threat.

The First 72 Hours (2000)
2000 documentary short film showing daily life as a sailor aboard USS Higgins.

In the second half of January 2006, Higgins conducted Mobility-Navigation and Seamanship (MOB-N and MOB-S) training while transiting to Puerto Vallarta for a three-day port visit. February and March saw various phases of the pre-deployment training cycle, including exercises or assessments in Anti-Terrorism and Force Protection, Engineering, Combat Systems Training Team capabilities, Supply and Medical Readiness, Damage Control, and Search and Rescue. In April 2006, Higgins offloaded ammo in Seal Beach and completed a Mobility-Engineering (MOB-E) assessment in preparation for the ensuing Selected Restricted Availability (SRA) period, which brought with it many equipment upgrades that enhanced Higgins's warfare capabilities. In August 2006, Higgins returned to Naval Station San Diego from the shipyard and kicked off the pre-deployment "workups", which included various inport scenarios involving Damage Control, Naval Surface Fire Support (NSFS), Ballistic Missile Defense (BMD), Undersea Warfare (USW), and Strike Warfare (STW). Later in the month, Higgins returned to Seal Beach to take on weapons required for the following year's deployment.

The ship performed logistical support for United States Coast Guard helicopters undergoing relief operations for the 2010 Haiti earthquake.

On 14 April 2018, she fired 23 Tomahawk missiles from a position in the north Persian Gulf as part of a bombing campaign in retaliation for the Syrian government's use of chemical weapons against people in Douma. On 27 May 2018, she, alongside the guided missile cruiser USS Antietam, patrolled the 12-nautical-mile (22 km; 14 mi) zone surrounding the Paracel Islands in the South China Sea, which Vietnam has claimed as its territory, in an act to ensure freedom of navigation. Some say the patrol was in response to the deployment of H6-K bombers by the People's Liberation Army Air Force. That act was considered by the Pentagon to be an act of aggression, leading to rising tensions in the area.

On August 16, 2021, Higgins arrived in United States Fleet Activities Yokosuka as her new homeport and part of DESRON 15.

On 20 September 2022, Higgins, alongside the Canadian frigate HMCS Vancouver, transited the Taiwan Strait.

On 28 April 2026, while deployed in the Indo-Pacific, an electrical fire disabled her electrical generation and propulsion systems, leaving the ship dead in the water. No injuries were reported.

=== Deployments ===
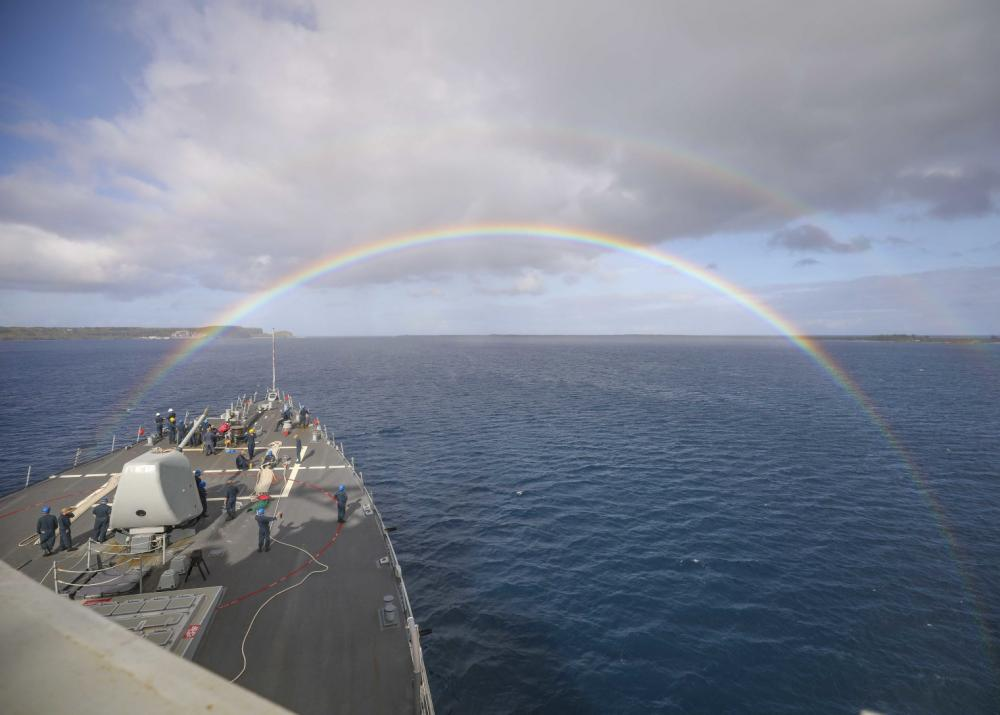
Higgins conducts routine underway operations.

- Maiden deployment – November 2000–May 2001 Western Pacific/Persian Gulf
- Sea swap deployment – November 2002–April 2004 Western Pacific/Persian Gulf.
- May 2005 - November 2005
- Around the world cruise - August 2009 - March 2010
- November 2017–21 June 2018 Western Pacific.
- Forward deployment – August 2021 - TBD Yokosuka, Japan

== Awards ==
- Navy Unit Commendation - (Jan-May 2003, Aug-Dec 2015)
- Navy Meritorious Unit Commendation - (Dec 2000-Mar 2001) TRUMAN BATTLE GROUP
- Coast Guard Meritorious Unit Commendation with Operational Distinguishing Device - (1997–1999)
- Battle "E" - (2003, 2021)
- National Defense Service Medal
- Humanitarian Service Medal - (14-25 Jan 2010) 2010 Haiti earthquake
- Sea Service Deployment Ribbon (multiple)
- Overseas Service Ribbon
- James F. Chezek Memorial Gunnery Award - (1999, 2001)

== Coat of arms ==
=== Shield ===
The shield has background of blue with a "V" cutting through the center. The griffin is shown in the "V" wielding an axe and a trident. The traditional Navy colors were chosen for the shield because dark blue, white and gold respectively represent the sea, integrity and excellence. The griffin, holding an axe and a trident, denotes valor and intelligence. The axe indicates her ability and readiness for engaging land based hostilities, while the trident symbolizes her modern weapon systems, giving her air combat and undersea engagement versatility. The "V" of the shield represents victory and the clover leaf is for good fortune.

=== Crest ===
The crest consists of an anchor with swords crossing in the middle, both surrounded by wreaths. The anchor is representative of the U.S. Navy. Two wreaths, one behind and one surrounding the anchor, symbolize the military and civilian honors awarded to Colonel Higgins for some unusual achievements. Crossed swords, a Naval officer's sword and a Marine Corps Mameluke, represent the long-standing tradition of Navy and Marine Corps cooperation in times of peace and war.

=== Motto ===
The motto is written on a scroll of gold that has a blue reverse side. The ships motto is "First to Fight". The motto is a reference to the honorable feats of Colonel Higgins and is part of The "Marines" Hymn.

=== Seal ===
The coat of arms in full color as in the blazon, upon a white background enclosed within a dark blue oval border edged on the outside with a gold rope and bearing the inscription "USS HIGGINS" at the top and "DDG 76" in the base all gold.
