= Matthew T. Quinn =

American military officer

Matt Quinn
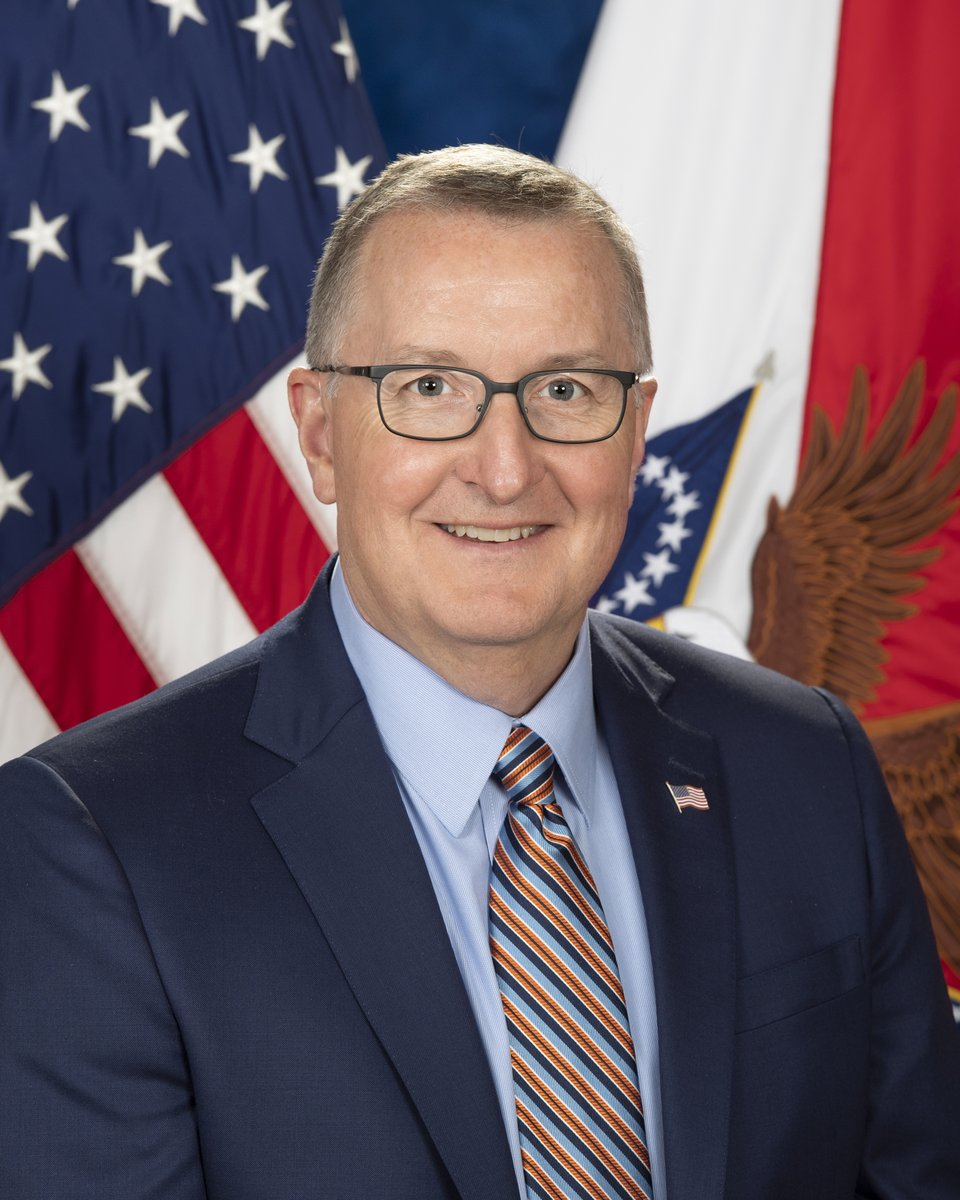

Under Secretary of Veterans Affairs for Memorial Affairs
- In office June 23, 2021 – May 23, 2024
- President: Joe Biden
- Deputy: Ronald E. Walters, Principal Deputy Under Secretary
- Preceded by: Randy Reeves
- Succeeded by: Sam Brown

27th Adjutant General of Montana
- In office April 2012 – January 2021
- Governor: Brian Schweitzer; Steve Bullock; Greg Gianforte
- Preceded by: John Walsh
- Succeeded by: John Hronek

Personal details
- Born: Matthew Quinn
- Spouse: Jody Quinn
- Children: 5
- Education: Montana State University (BS); University of Montana (MBA); Army War College (MSS)

Military service
- Branch/service: United States Army
- Rank: Major General
- Unit: Army National Guard; Montana National Guard

Matthew T. "Matt" Quinn is an American retired military officer and government official who served as Under Secretary of Veterans Affairs for Memorial Affairs in the Biden administration.

== Education ==
Quinn earned a Bachelor of Science degree in electrical engineering from Montana State University, a Master of Business Administration from the University of Montana, and a Master of Strategic Studies from the United States Army War College.

== Career ==
During his career, Quinn has served in the United States Army and Army National Guard. From April 2012 to January 2021, Quinn was the 27th adjutant general of Montana, serving as commander of the Montana National Guard and director of the Montana Department of Military Affairs. On April 9, 2021, President Joe Biden announced his intent to nominate Quinn to be the Under Secretary of Veterans Affairs for Memorial Affairs. On April 19, 2021, his nomination was sent to the Senate. His nomination was reported out of the Senate Committee on Veterans' Affairs, and confirmed by the full Senate on June 17, 2021. He was sworn into office on June 23, 2021, by Secretary Denis McDonough.

Qinn resigned his position in May 2024.
