= William R. Higgins =

United States Marine Corps officer (1945–1989)

William Richard Higgins
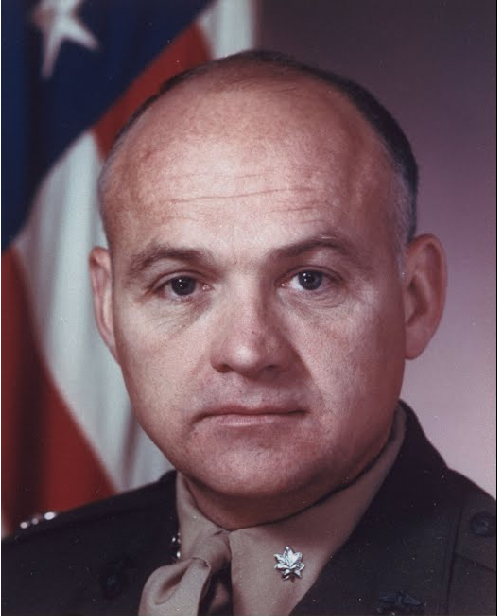
- William R. Higgins, USMC
- Born: January 15, 1945; Danville, Kentucky, U.S.
- Died: December 31, 1988 (aged 43); Declared dead on July 6, 1990 (aged 45); Beirut, Lebanon
- Burial place: Quantico National Cemetery
- Relatives: LtCol Robin Higgins, USMC, Ret. (spouse), Christine Higgins Tabaka (daughter)
- Military career
- Allegiance: United States
- Branch: United States Marine Corps
- Service years: 1967–1989 (officially to 1990)
- Rank: Colonel
- Nickname: Rich
- Unit: United Nations
- Conflicts: Vietnam War
- Awards: Defense Distinguished Service Medal; Defense Superior Service Medal; Legion of Merit; Bronze Star with Combat "V"; Purple Heart; Combat Action Ribbon

William Richard Higgins (January 15, 1945 – July 31, 1989) was a United States Marine Corps colonel who was captured in Lebanon in 1988 while serving on a United Nations (UN) peacekeeping mission. He was held hostage, tortured, and, 17 months later, he was murdered by his captors.

== Biography ==
William Higgins was born in Danville, Kentucky, on January 15, 1945. He graduated from Southern High School in Louisville and earned his bachelor's degree from Miami University in Oxford, Ohio. A scholarship student in the Navy ROTC, he received the Marine Corps Association Award and was commissioned in the Marine Corps in 1967. He later obtained master's degrees from Pepperdine University and Auburn University. He graduated from the Army Infantry Officers Advanced Course, the Air Force Command and Staff College, and the National War College.

As a lieutenant, he participated in combat operations in 1968 in South Vietnam as a rifle company platoon commander and executive officer with C Company, 1st Battalion, 3rd Marine Regiment, 3rd Marine Division. He was aide-de-camp to the Assistant Commander of the 3rd Marine Division.

Returning to the States, Lt. Higgins served at Headquarters Marine Corps in 1969. In 1970, he served as the Officer-in-Charge of the Officer Selection Team in Louisville, Kentucky.

He returned to Vietnam in 1972, serving as an infantry battalion advisor to the South Vietnamese Marine Division. In 1973, he served as a rifle company commander with B Company, 1st Battalion, 4th Marine Regiment, 3rd Marine Division, in Vietnam.

From 1973 to 1977, Captain Higgins served at the Staff Noncommissioned Officers Academy and Officer Candidate School at Quantico, Virginia.

Returning to the Fleet Marine Force in 1977, Capt. Higgins was assigned to the 2nd Marine Division at Camp Lejeune, North Carolina, where he again served as a rifle company commander with A Company, 1st Battalion, 2nd Marine Regiment. Upon promotion to major, he was reassigned as the Logistics Officer for Regimental Landing Team 2, 4th Marine Amphibious Brigade.

After completion of the Air Force Command and Staff College at Maxwell Air Force Base in 1980, designated a distinguished graduate, Higgins returned to Washington, D.C., where he served at Headquarters as a Plans Officer until his selection to the Office of the Secretary of Defense.

In 1981 and 1982, he served as Military Assistant to the Special Assistant to the Secretary and Deputy Secretary of Defense, then as Assistant for Interagency Matters to the Executive Secretary for the Department of Defense.

After graduation from the National War College in 1985, he returned to the Pentagon as the Military Assistant to the Secretary of Defense, where he served until he was transferred to his United Nations assignment in July 1987. He was promoted to colonel on March 1, 1989, while in captivity.

== Capture and murder ==
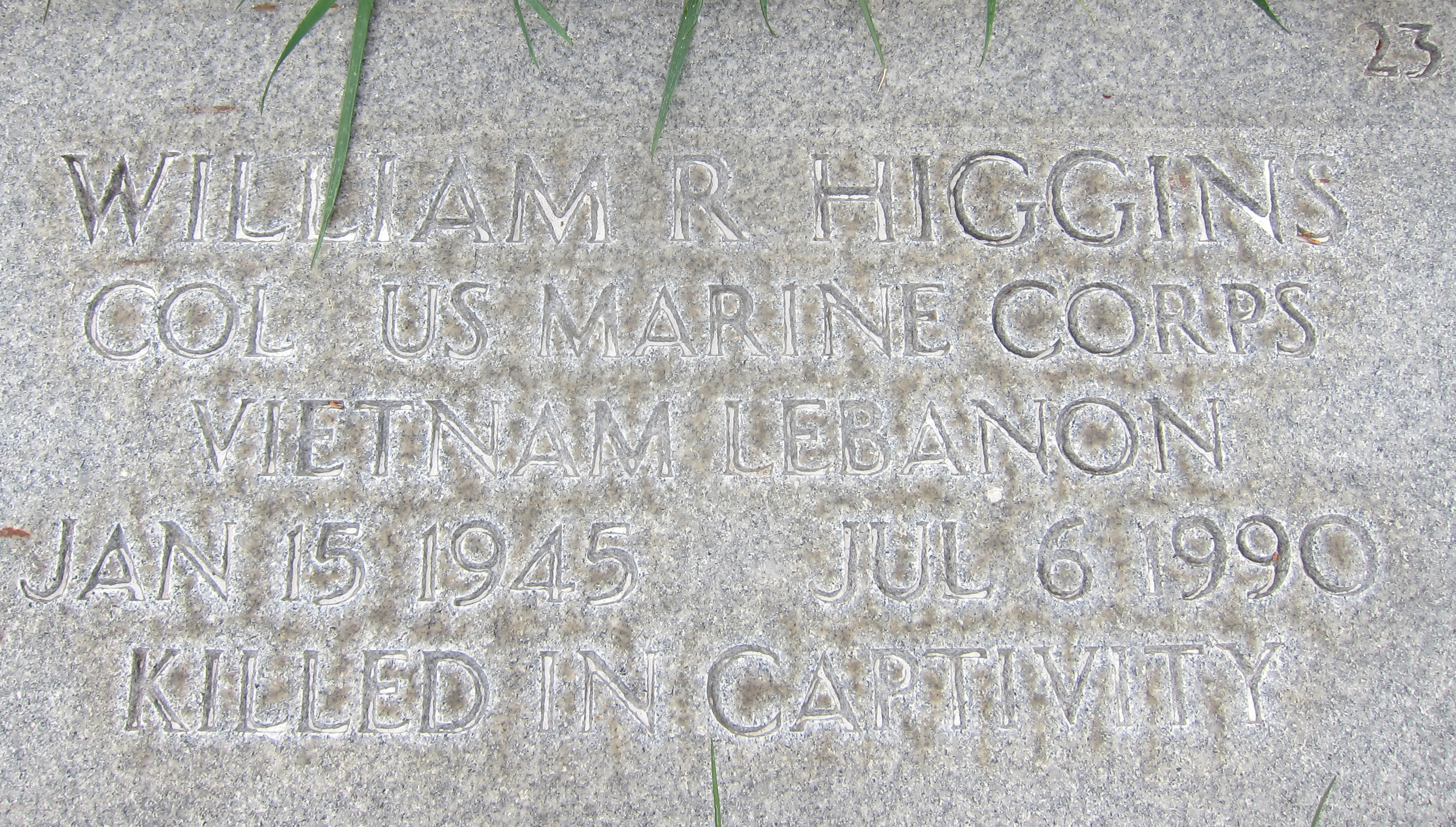
Headstone detail

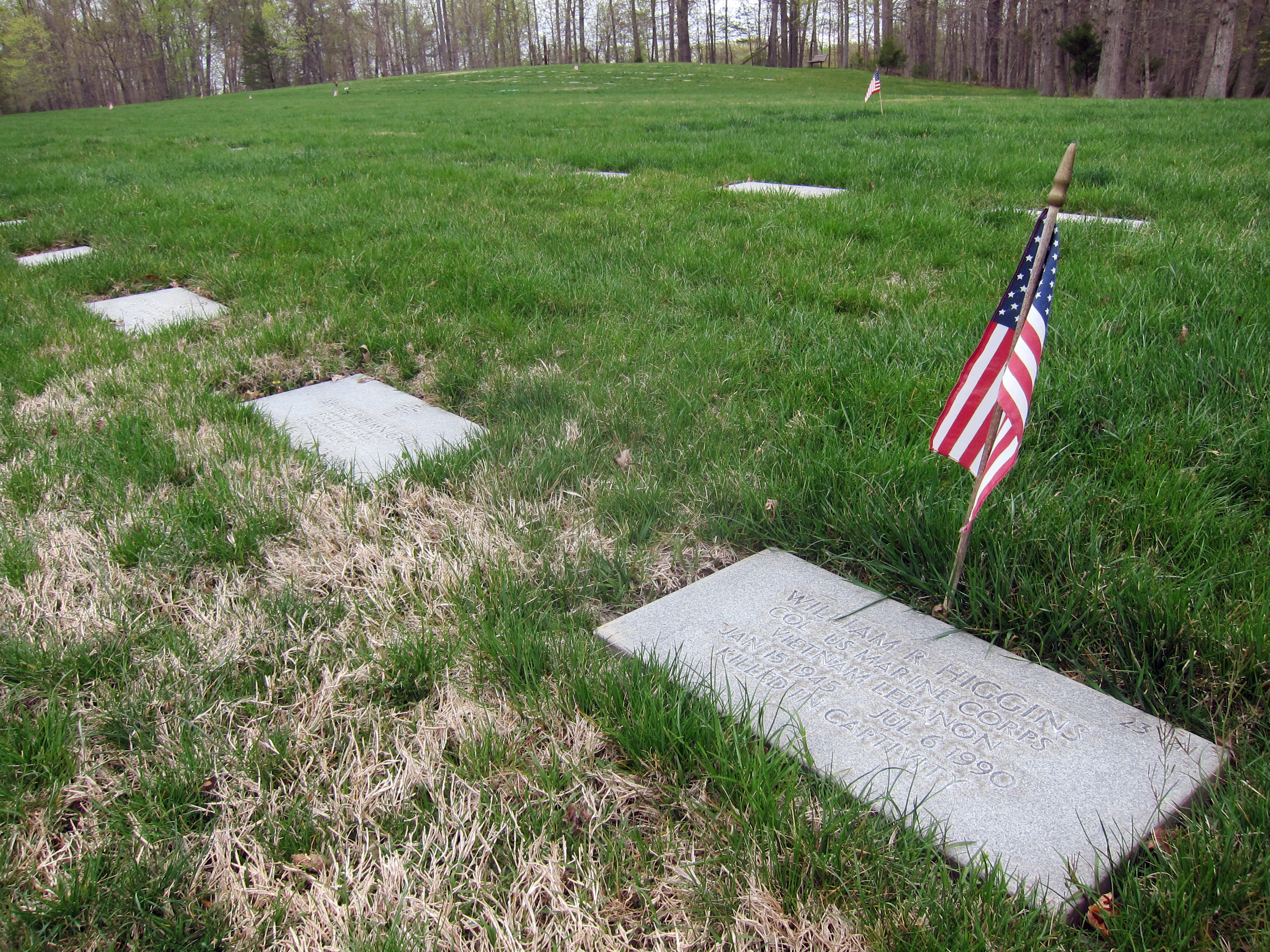
William R. Higgins' headstone in Quantico National Cemetery

In 1982, the situation in Lebanon started to become more chaotic and violent. In 1985, three years before Higgins's kidnapping, William Francis Buckley, another retired American lieutenant colonel working for the CIA had been kidnapped, tortured, and murdered. On February 17, 1988, this situation repeated itself when Higgins, who was serving as the Chief, Observer Group Lebanon and Senior Military Observer, United Nations Military Observer Group, United Nations Truce Supervision Organization, was abducted.

Higgins was driving alone on the coastal highway between Tyre and Naqoura in southern Lebanon, returning from a meeting with a local leader of the Amal movement, when a car blocked the road in front of him and forced him to stop, after which he was pulled from his vehicle by armed men suspected of being affiliated with Hezbollah.

As a reaction to his abduction, the United Nations Security Council adopted Resolution 618, demanding his release.

During his captivity, he was interrogated and tortured. On April 21, 1988, a public statement in Arabic, along with black-and-white pictures of a disheveled and scruffy Higgins, was sent by the kidnappers to the news agency Reuters in which they proclaimed that Higgins was a war criminal and would be tried by a "tribunal of the oppressed". The kidnappers who claimed responsibility for Higgins' capture claimed to form part of a Shia Muslim terrorist organization called "The Organization of the Oppressed on Earth", which was in reality a pro-Iranian wing of Hezbollah.

Higgins was eventually charged with "spying for the criminal United States on our Lebanese and Palestinian peoples,” and "active participation in American conspiracies against our Muslim people.” Higgins, the statement went on to elaborate, worked in Lebanon supervising a "Pentagon team to combat Lebanese and Palestinian Islamic organizations in Palestine and Lebanon.” American governmental officials rejected the accusations as "nonsense,” and noted that Higgins had not been working on behalf of the United States government, but for the United Nations on a peacekeeping mission.

After his kidnapping, rumors and unconfirmed reports about Higgins' death began to circulate. For instance, on April 18, 1988, a Lebanese radio news outlet called Voice of Lebanon controlled by Maronite Christians, which was thus unlikely to be influenced by Muslim extremists, claimed that Higgins had died in southern Lebanon in the crossfire of an armed clash between pro-Syrian and pro-Iranian militias as both Syria and Iran fought a proxy war on Lebanon for control of said country. Sources from the United Nations in the region claimed that Higgins had died under torture after he tried to escape.

On July 31, 1989, the group announced that it had executed Higgins by hanging, and publicly released a videotape of the act along with a statement calling the graphic footage "an opening gift" for Israel and the United States. This was in retaliation for the abduction of Hezbollah leader Sheik Abdul Karim Obeid by Israeli commandos in South Lebanon, July 27, 1989, during which two other people accompanying Obeid also were taken and a neighbour killed. The operation had been planned by Israel's then minister of defence, Yitzhak Rabin.

The footage showed images of Higgins' body hanging by the neck as he slowly suffocated to death, and were televised around the world. FBI experts analyzed the footage. They concluded the body hanged was indeed Colonel Higgins. The video was also examined by Israeli security services, who raised doubts about its authenticity. Among other things, Higgins is seen in the video wearing a coat and winter clothes, which do not match the summer weather in July in Lebanon. Afterwards, with the return of his body to the Americans, knife cuts were discovered in his throat – which was likely the cause of death. According to the researchers who examined all the evidence, Higgins was murdered in December 1988.

Higgins was declared dead on July 6, 1990. His remains were recovered on December 23, 1991, by Major Jens Nielsen of the Royal Danish Army, who was attached to the United Nations Observation Group in Beirut. The remains were found in an advanced state of decomposition beside a mosque near a south Beirut hospital. His body had been buried for several months prior. After Higgins was murdered, his kidnappers buried the body. They then dug it out almost a year later, with their public statements.

Once recovered, Colonel Higgins' body was flown to Dover Air Force Base in Delaware, where it was conclusively identified and then he was interred at Quantico National Cemetery, Triangle, Virginia, on December 30, 1991. A memorial and religious service for Higgins had previously been held in November 1989 at Louisville's Southern High School, from which Higgins had graduated in 1963.

== Aftermath ==
On February 16, 1992, Israeli troops assassinated Hezbollah leader Abbas al-Musawi. Hezbollah responded one month later by attacking the Israeli embassy in Buenos Aires, Argentina, killing 29 people.

In 1999, Higgins' widow filed a civil suit against Iran as the main sponsor of Hezbollah and the Islamic Revolutionary Guard in the United States Federal district court. The court ruled in her favor and issued a default judgment ordering the defendants, including the Islamic Republic Iran, to pay $57 million in compensatory damages to Higgin's widow and daughter for the 529 days he was held and tortured. The court ordered an additional $300 million in punitive damages be paid by the Revolutionary Guard. Iran showed no intention of paying the damage award.

== Military awards ==
Higgins' military decorations and awards include the following:

Parachutist Badge
Defense Distinguished Service Medal		Defense Superior Service Medal
Legion of Merit	Bronze Star Medal w/ Combat "V"	Purple Heart
Meritorious Service Medal	Navy and Marine Corps Commendation Medal w/ Combat "V" and 5/16" Gold Star	Combat Action Ribbon w/ 5/16" Gold Star
Navy Unit Commendation w/ two 3/16" Bronze Stars	Navy Meritorious Unit Commendation w/ 3/16" Bronze Star	Presidential Citizen Medal
Prisoner of War Medal	National Defense Service Medal	Armed Forces Expeditionary Medal
Vietnam Service Medal w/ 3/16" Silver Star and 3/16" Bronze Star	Navy and Marine Corps Sea Service Deployment Ribbon	Navy and Marine Corps Overseas Service Ribbon
Vietnam Cross of Gallantry w/ 5/16" Silver Star	Vietnam Staff Service Medal; 1st Class	Republic of Vietnam Gallantry Cross Unit Citation
Republic of Vietnam Civil Actions Medal	United Nations Medal	Vietnam Campaign Medal

In April 2003, he was posthumously granted a Prisoner of War Medal. In 1998, Department of Defense General Counsel, Judith A. Miller, initially blocked the award, based on the claim that "circumstances do not appear to meet the criteria established by Congress for award of the Prisoner of War Medal." The Navy later overruled her after it was determined that the 1989 expansion of the eligibility criteria allowed the award.

=== Other awards and honors ===
On March 18, 1992, President George Bush awarded Colonel Higgins the Presidential Citizens Medal (posthumous). The medal was accepted by his wife, Robin, and daughter, Chrissy. Higgins was also survived by two sisters.

On February 17, 1994, the Secretary of the Navy announced a new Arleigh Burke-class guided missile destroyer would be named after Higgins. On October 4, 1997, the USS Higgins (DDG-76) was christened by Higgins' widow, Robin Higgins, and commissioned on April 24, 1999.

== See also ==
- William Francis Buckley: A retired lieutenant colonel from the United States Army working as a CIA officer in Lebanon who was kidnapped, tortured and murdered by Islamic militants in 1985.
- List of kidnappings
- List of solved missing person cases: 1950–1999
