= Under Secretary of Veterans Affairs for Memorial Affairs =

Position in the US on national cemeteries

Department of Veteran Affairs Under Secretary for Memorial Affairs (USM)
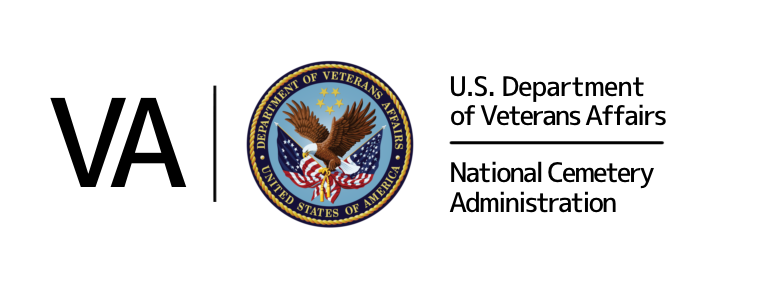

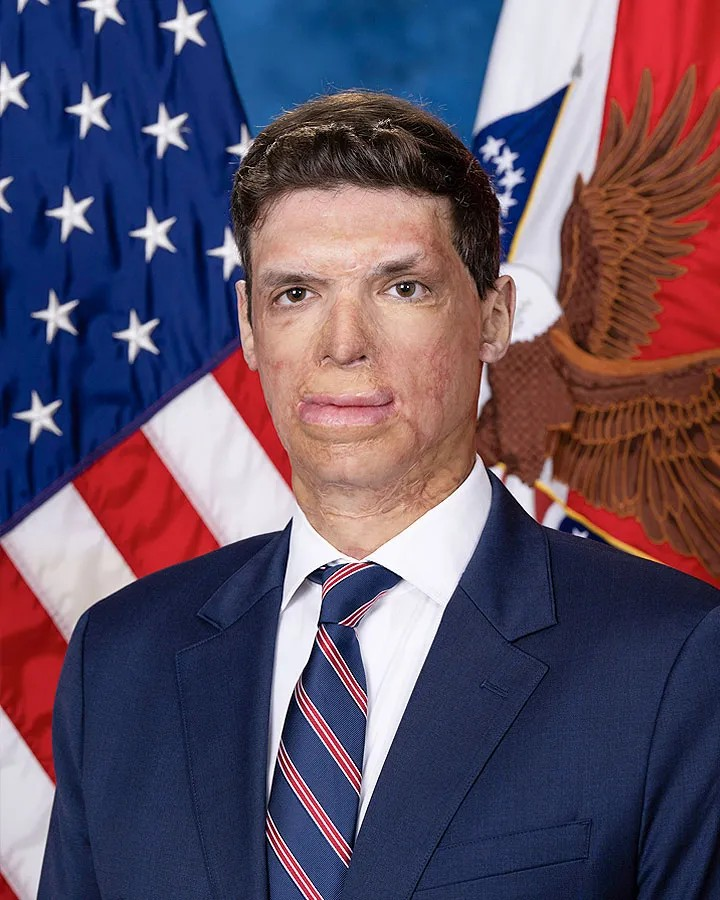
- Incumbent; Sam Brown since August 1, 2025
- National Cemetery Administration
- Style: The Honorable
- Reports to: Secretary of Veterans Affairs
- Appointer: The president; with Senate advice and consent
- Constituting instrument: § 1000 of the National Cemeteries Act, Pub. L. 93–43, S. 49, 87 Stat. 75, enacted June 18, 1973, as amended
- Precursor: Director of the National Cemetery System
- Formation: March 15, 1989 as Under Secretary
- Deputy: Principal Deputy Under Secretary
- Salary: Executive Schedule, Level III ($187,300 USD (2022))

The under secretary for memorial affairs is a senior position within the United States Department of Veterans Affairs that directs the National Cemetery Administration, which maintains 150 national cemeteries and provides burial services for veterans of the United States military and eligible family members.

The under secretary is nominated by the president and confirmed by the Senate.

On January 20, 2025, President Donald Trump nominated Sam Brown to serve as the Under Secretary of Veterans Affairs for Memorial Affairs. Brown was confirmed by the Senate on July 29, 2025, by a roll call vote of 54–44, with Nevada Senators Catherine Cortez Masto and Jacky Rosen, both Democrats, voting in favor of the confirmation. He was sworn into office on August 1, 2025, by Secretary of Veterans Affairs Doug Collins.

== History and responsibilities ==
In addition to the maintenance and operation of national cemeteries, the under secretary is also responsible for their land acquisition, design, and construction. Other memorial programs overseen by the under secretary include the provision of headstones, markers, and Presidential Memorial Certificates—engraved paper certificates signed by the current president—to honor deceased veterans' service. The under secretary also administers federal grants to help states establish state veterans' cemeteries.

The position was created by the Veterans Programs Enhancement Act of 1998, which was signed by President Clinton on November 11, 1998. As a result of the act, the organization led by a director, the National Cemetery System, evolved from an agency into an administration led by an under secretary when it was renamed to the National Cemetery Administration. From April 1998 to early September 2000, a series of acting directors and acting under secretaries headed the administration. Two of these were Roger R. Rapp and Mike Walker, with the latter later being confirmed by the United States Senate. They were followed by under secretaries Robin L. Higgins and John W. Nicholson.

== List of under secretaries for memorial affairs ==
Originally, the position was Chief Memorial Affairs Director and then director of the National Cemetery System.

Public Law 105-368 (November 11, 1998) changed the National Cemetery System, headed by a Director, to the National Cemetery Administration, headed by the under secretary of memorial affairs.

The following individuals served as director or under secretary:

Portrait	Secretary	Took office	Left office	Notes
	Rufus Harold Wilson	February 8, 1974	January 23, 1975	
	John W. Mahan	January 23, 1975	January 28, 1977	acting director from August 1973 – January 1977
	Carl Thomas Noll	May 9, 1977	January 27, 1981	died in office
	Paul Takeo Bannai	December 7, 1981	September 30, 1985	
	Wilfred Louis Ebel	July 1987	April 1989	
	Jo Ann Krukar Webb	October 10, 1989	November 1991	
	Allen B. Clark Jr.	November 22, 1991	January 19, 1993	
	Jerry Wayne Bowen	May 20, 1993	April 3, 1998	
	Robert "Mike" Walker	September 8, 2000	January 2001	
	Robin L. Higgins	May 24, 2001	September 1, 2002	
	John W. "Jack" Nicholson	April 11, 2003	January 19, 2005	
	William F. Tuerk	October 28, 2005	January 19, 2009	
	Steve L. Muro	June 6, 2011	June 22, 2014	was acting under secretary from January 19, 2009 until appointed as permanent under secretary
	Randy Reeves	December 13, 2017	January 20, 2021	
	Ronald E. Walters	January 20, 2021	June 23, 2021	acting under secretary
	Matthew T. Quinn	June 23, 2021	May 23, 2024	
	Ronald E. Walters	May 23, 2024	August 1, 2025	acting under secretary
	Sam Brown	August 1, 2025	Present	
