= Little Rock, Mississippi =

- Unincorporated community
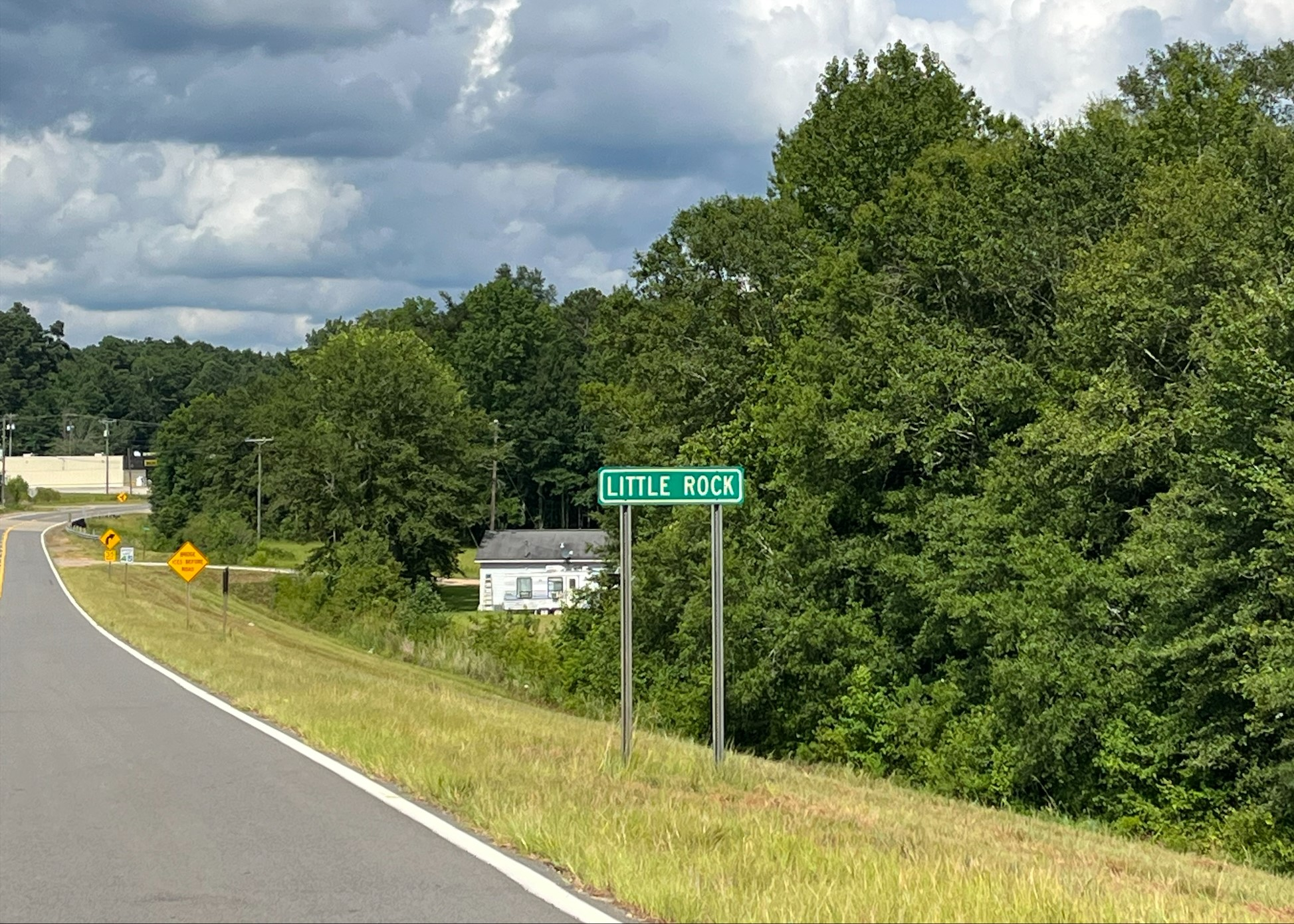
- Sign for Little Rock

- Location within Mississippi Location within the United States
- Coordinates: 32°31′34″N 89°01′31″W
- Country: United States
- State: Mississippi
- County: Newton
- Elevation: 440 ft (130 m)
- Time zone: UTC-6 (Central (CST))
  - Summer (DST): UTC-5 (CDT)
- ZIP code: 39337
- Area code: 601
- GNIS feature ID: 672659

Little Rock, Mississippi is an unincorporated community in Newton County, Mississippi. It lies along Little Rock Creek and Mississippi Highway 494 between Union and Meridian. The elevation is 440 ft (130 m). It was the former site of Beulah Hubbard High School.

A post office under the name Little Rock first began operation in 1914.

== Notable people ==
- Kortney Clemons (born 1980), Paralympic athlete in track and field
- Andy Ogletree (born 1998), amateur golfer, 2019 U.S. Amateur champion
- Randy Reeves (born 1962), Under-Secretary of Veterans Affairs for Memorial Affairs (2017−present)

== Gallery ==
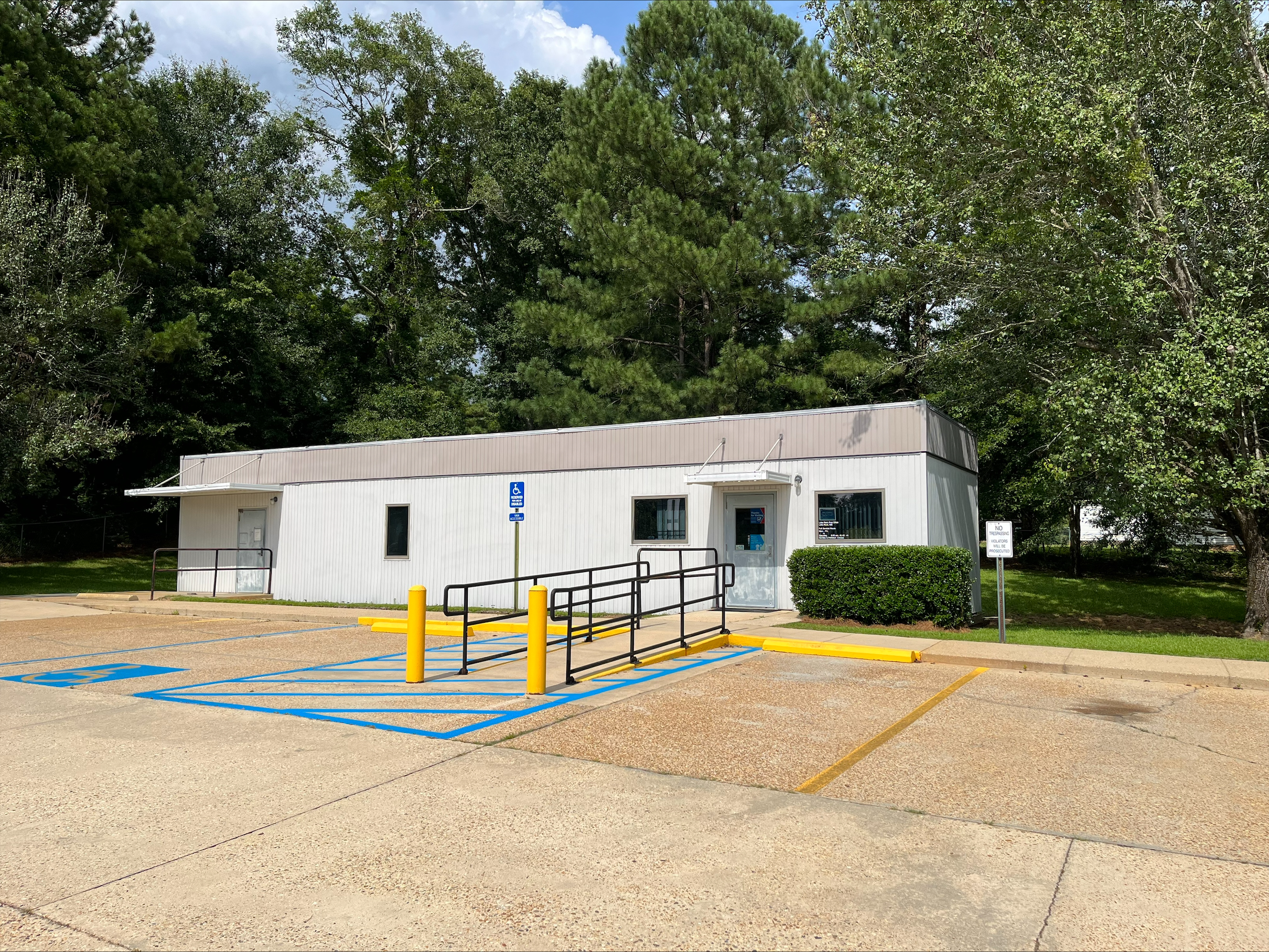
Little Rock Post Office
