= Ronald E. Walters =

American government official

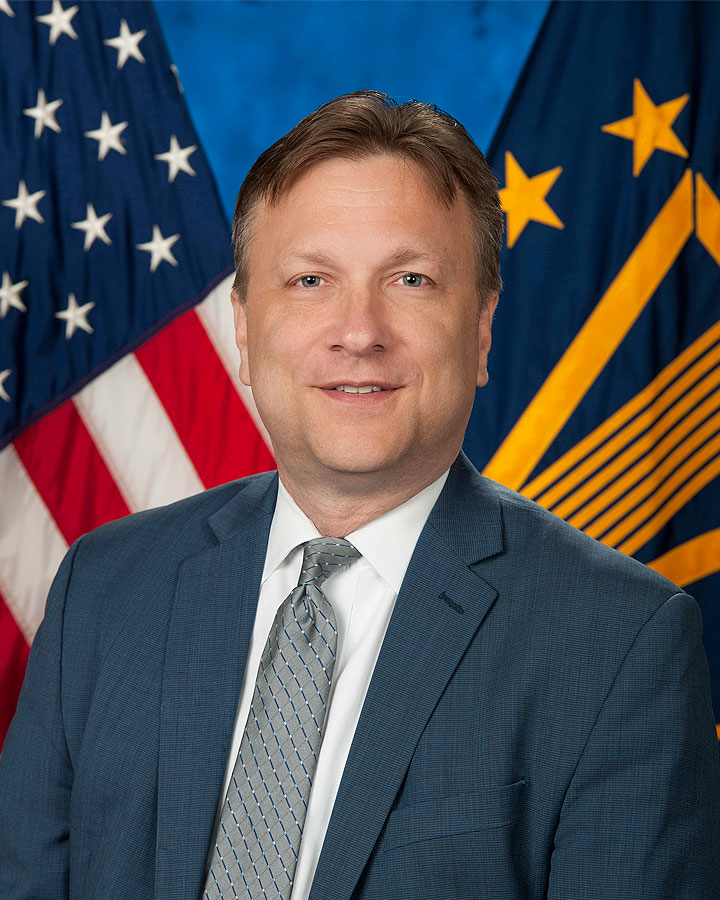

Principal Deputy Under Secretary for Memorial Affairs
- Incumbent
- Assumed office January 2015

Acting Under Secretary of Veterans Affairs for Memorial Affairs
- In office May 24, 2024 – August 1, 2025
- Preceded by: Matthew T. Quinn
- Succeeded by: Sam Brown
- In office January 2021 – June 2021
- Preceded by: Randy Reeves
- Succeeded by: Matthew T. Quinn
- In office June 23, 2014 – December 2017
- Preceded by: Steve Muro
- Succeeded by: Randy Reeves

Personal details
- Born: 1962 (age 63–64)
- Education: Georgetown University (BA); George Washington University (MPA); Johns Hopkins University (PhD)
- Occupation: Government official, academic
- Awards: Presidential Rank Award (Meritorious: 2010, Distinguished: 2017); VA Meritorious Service Award (2017); VA Exceptional Service Award (2019)

Ronald E. Walters is an American government official who has served as Principal Deputy Under Secretary for Memorial Affairs at the National Cemetery Administration (NCA), a component of the United States Department of Veterans Affairs, since January 2015. He has also served as the acting Under Secretary for Memorial Affairs on many occasions, most recently from May 2024 to August 2025.

== Early life and education ==
Born in 1962, Walters earned a dual degree in government and English literature from Georgetown University in 1984, graduating magna cum laude and as a member of Phi Beta Kappa. He was also a finalist for a Rhodes Scholarship from Virginia. He received a master's degree in public administration from George Washington University in 1986 and a PhD in political science from Johns Hopkins University in 2002.

== Career ==
=== Early career (1985–2003) ===
Walters joined the Department of Veterans Affairs in 1985 as a budget analyst in the Controller's Office. He also worked in the Office of Management and Budget. According to The Washington Post, his early work included construction-related budgets, financial statements, staffing levels, workload projections, and writing contracts. His responsibilities expanded during his first decade at the department, with the budgets under his responsibility increasing from about $45 million to $1 billion.

In October 2003, he became Associate Chief Financial Officer for Budget and Planning at the Office of Personnel Management, a position he held until about 2006.

=== National Cemetery Administration ===
In July 2006, Walters joined the National Cemetery Administration as Deputy Under Secretary for Finance and Planning and Chief Financial Officer. In this role, he was responsible for financial and planning functions, including implementation of requirements under the Chief Financial Officers Act and the Government Performance and Results Act.

In January 2015, Walters became Principal Deputy Under Secretary for Memorial Affairs. He served as acting Under Secretary for Memorial Affairs from 23 June 2014, following the retirement of Steve Muro, until December 2017, when Randy Reeves was confirmed as Under Secretary.

Walters again served as acting Under Secretary for Memorial Affairs from January to June 2021, between the departure of Randy Reeves and the confirmation of Matthew T. Quinn. He returned to the position on 24 May 2024 following Quinn's departure and served until Sam Brown was confirmed as Under Secretary on 1 August 2025.

During his tenure in the position, the NCA reduced the population threshold used to determine eligibility for sites for new national cemeteries from 170,000 veterans within a 75-mile radius to 80,000 veterans within the same radius. Walters was also involved in the establishment of the Veterans Legacy Program and Veterans Legacy Memorial, which provide information about the service and lives of veterans buried in VA cemeteries.

==== Key actions ====
In May 2015, while serving as interim Under Secretary for Memorial Affairs, Walters spoke at the dedication of the Tallahassee National Cemetery in Florida, the 132nd national cemetery in the United States and the eighth in the state.

In August 2016, Walters informed California Representative Jared Huffman that the Department of Veterans Affairs would no longer permit Confederate flags to be displayed on large flagpoles at national cemeteries on Memorial Day or Confederate Memorial Day. In a letter to Huffman, Walters said the department was aware of concerns that the flags were viewed by many as symbols of racial intolerance, while noting that some regarded them as historical symbols.

A 2024 profile in The New Yorker described Walters as having spent almost four decades in federal service and noted his attention to operational details at national cemeteries, including headstone production, grounds maintenance and the alignment of graves to show complete respect to the deceased. The article described the National Cemetery Administration as operating 155 national cemeteries and conducting more than 140,000 burials of veterans and their family members annually.

Walters announced an expansion of the Veterans Legacy Memorial to include 210,000 additional pages for veterans interred or memorialized at cemeteries and memorials operated by the American Battle Monuments Commission overseas in May 2025. The expansion brought the total number of Veterans Legacy Memorial pages to more than 10 million.

== Recognition and academic work ==
Walters received the Presidential Rank Award at the meritorious level in 2010 and the distinguished level in 2017.He also received the Secretary of Veterans Affairs Meritorious Service Award in 2017 and the Secretary of Veterans Affairs Exceptional Service Award in 2019.

In 2014, Walters was a finalist for the Samuel J. Heyman Service to America Medal in management excellence. In 2019, he was included on the HillVets 100 list. He has also taught as a senior lecturer in the Department of Political Science at the University of Maryland, Baltimore County, and was nominated for the university's Kendall Award for Excellence in Teaching in 2019.

In September 2014, The Washington Post profiled Walters in connection with his selection as a finalist for the Heyman Service to America Medal. The article discussed his focused work at the National Cemetery Administration, including the expansion of the national cemetery system and the agency's high customer-satisfaction ratings.
