= Beulah Hubbard High School =

Defunct school in Little Rock, Mississippi

Coordinates: 32°30′03″N 89°01′39″W

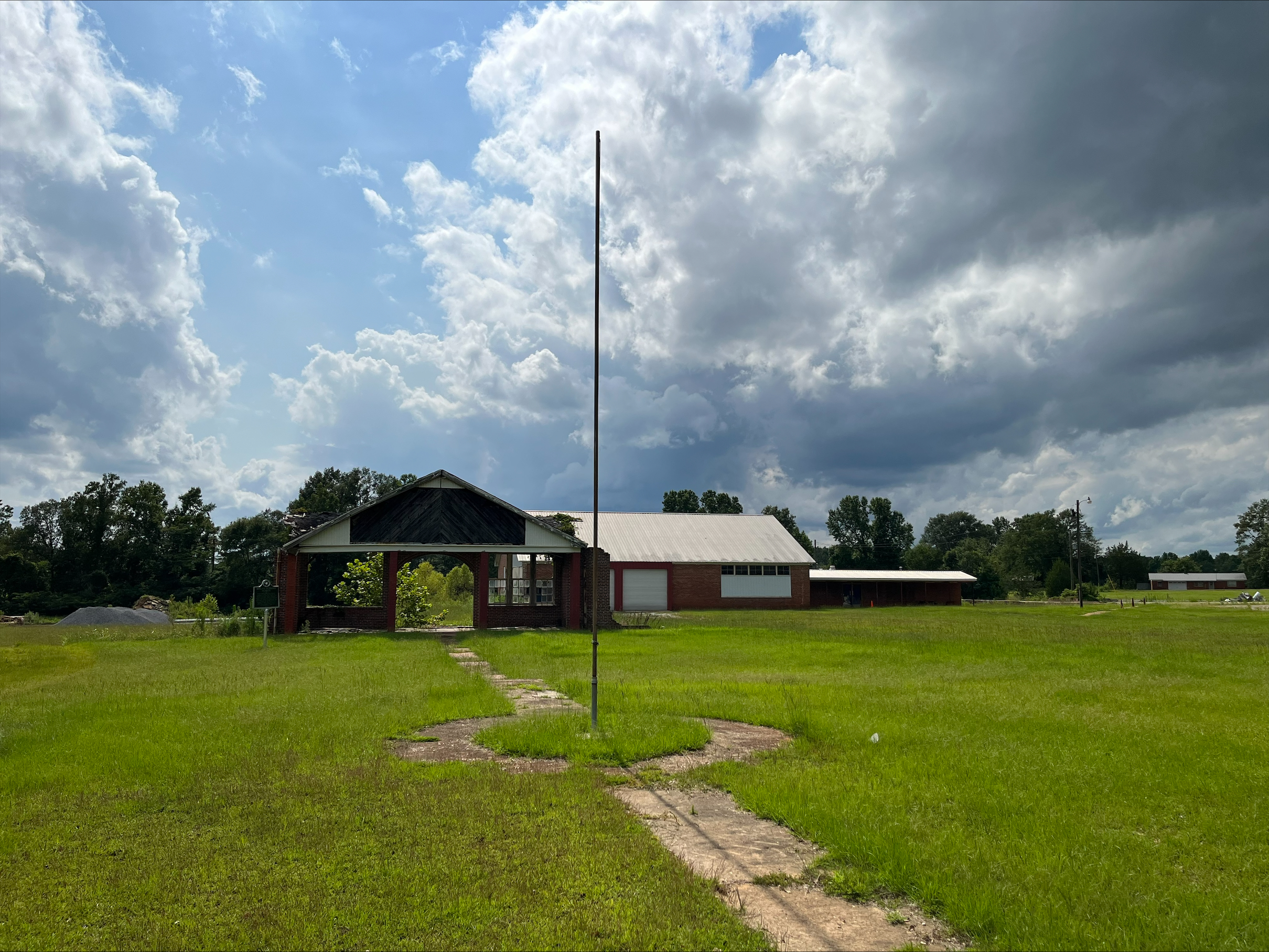
- Façade and flag pole of Beulah Hubbard
- Little Rock, Mississippi; United States

Information
- Type: High School
- Established: 1929
- Closed: 1990
- Colors: Blue, gold
- Team name: Rebels

Beulah Hubbard High School was a public high school in Little Rock, Mississippi. In 1990 it was one of the schools merged to create Newton County High School. The school teams were called the "Rebels."

== History ==
Beulah Hubbard was formed in 1929 from the consolidation of the nearby schools of Beulah, Witt, Oakland, Rock Branch, Little Rock, Hebron, Greenland, Hopewell, Center Ridge, Duffee, and Battlefield. The school was named for the nearby Beulah Baptist Church and F. J. Hubbard, who was the director of the Mississippi Vocational Education Board when Beulah Hubbard was established.

== Athletics ==
The Beulah Hubbard Rebels football team first season was in 1962 and their final season was in 1989. The overall record was 129-131-17.

The Beulah Hubbard Rebels baseball team won state championships in 1972, 1984, 1986, and 1987. In 2017, Durwood Munn, who coached Beulah Hubbard from 1965 to 1972 and 1979 to 1988, was inducted into the Crossroads Diamond Club Hall of Fame.

== Gallery ==
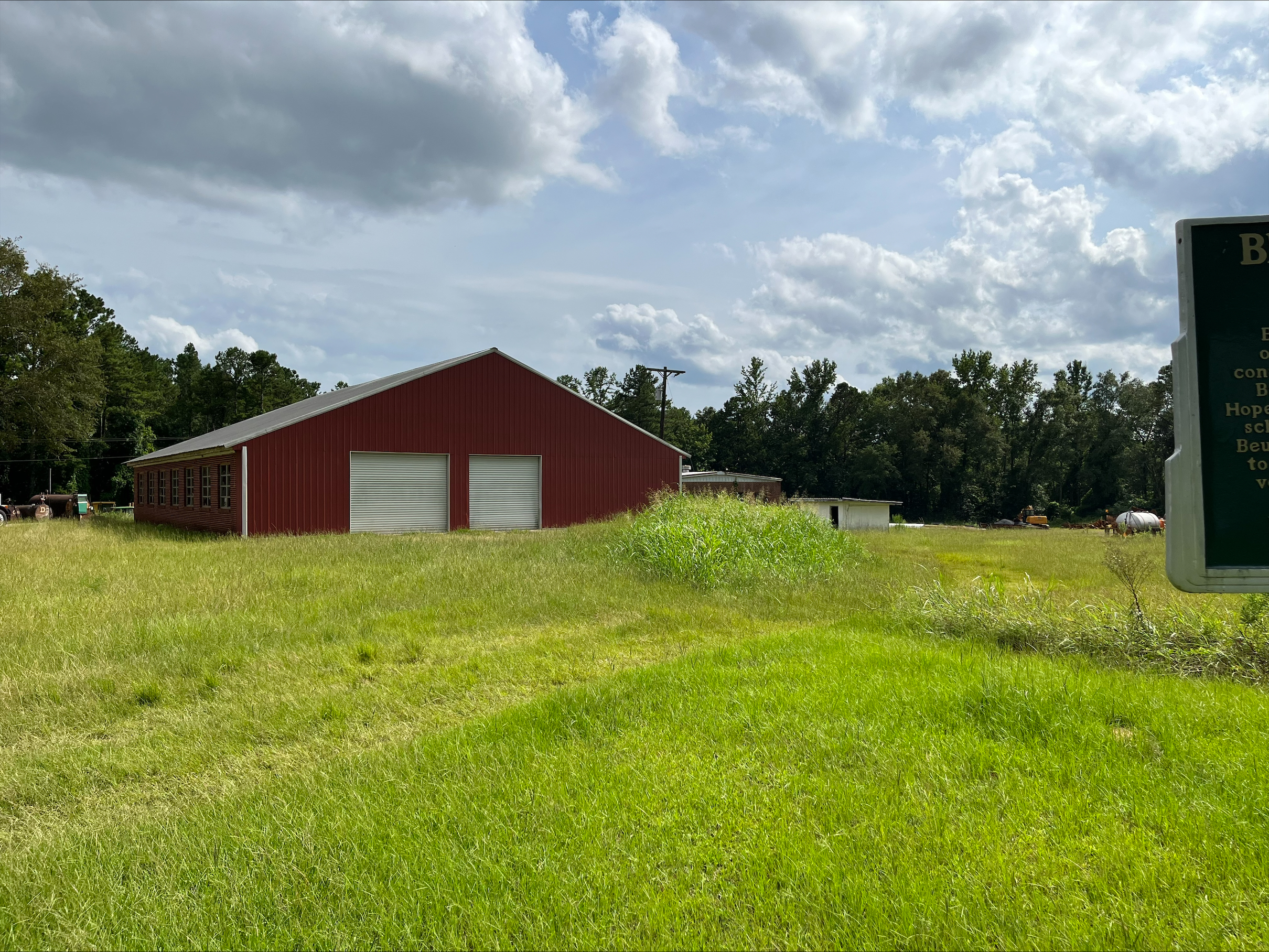
Beulah Hubbard gymnasium, now used to store equipment for Newton County Highway Department.

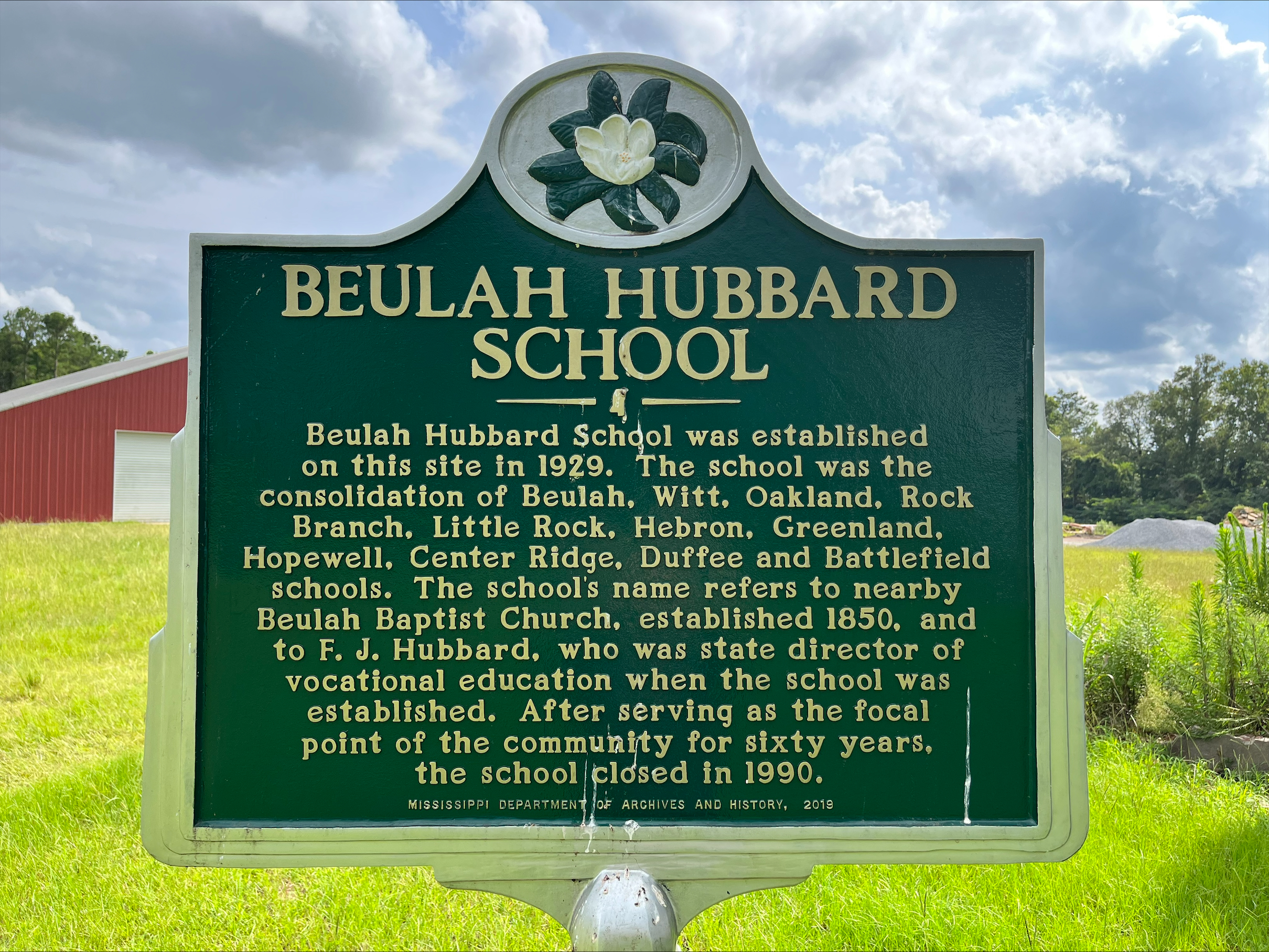
Historical marker for Beulah Hubbard School
