= Sam Brown (military officer) =

American politician and military veteran

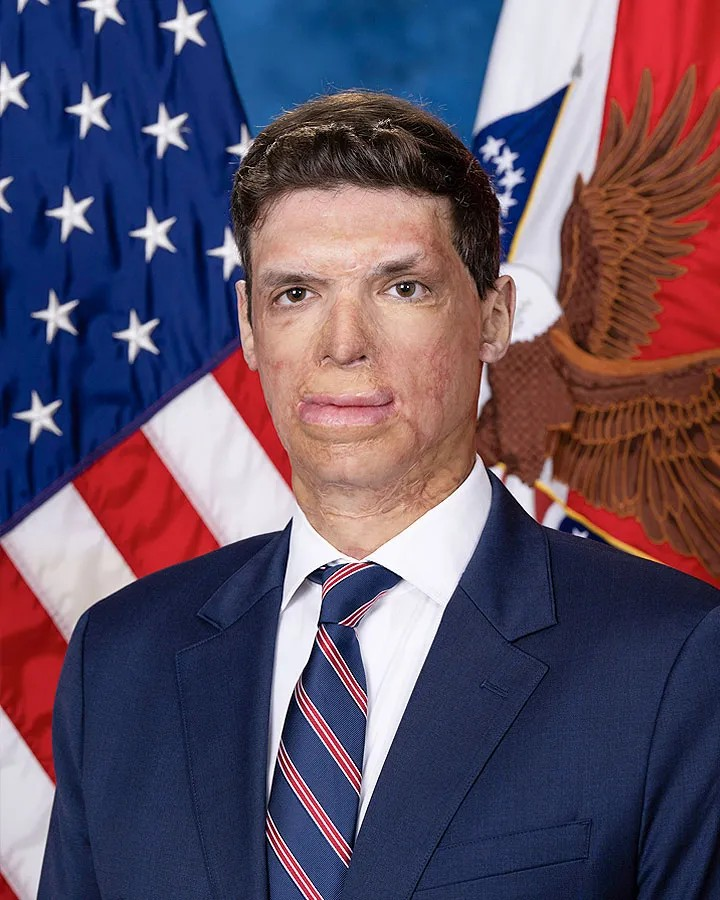
- Official portrait, 2025

Under Secretary of Veterans Affairs for Memorial Affairs
- Incumbent
- Assumed office August 1, 2025
- President: Donald Trump
- Preceded by: Ronald E. Walters (acting)

Personal details
- Born: Samuel Boaz Brown; October 15, 1983 (age 42) Arkansas, U.S.
- Citizenship: American; Cherokee Nation
- Party: Republican
- Spouse: Amy Larsen (m. 2009)
- Children: 3
- Relatives: Mike Brown (great-uncle)
- Education: United States Military Academy (BS); Southern Methodist University (MBA)
- Website: Campaign website

Military service
- Allegiance: United States
- Branch/service: United States Army
- Years of service: 2006–2011
- Rank: Captain
- Unit: 1st Infantry Division
- Battles/wars: War in Afghanistan
- Awards: Bronze Star Medal; Purple Heart; Combat Infantry Badge

Samuel Boaz Brown (born October 15, 1983) is an American politician, military officer, author, and government official serving as the Under Secretary of Veterans Affairs for Memorial Affairs since 2025. He served in the United States Army during the War in Afghanistan, and sustained burns to thirty percent of his body due to an improvised explosive device injury in 2008.

Brown began several business ventures and became active in Republican Party politics in Texas. In 2014, he unsuccessfully sought the party's nomination for a seat in the Texas House of Representatives. After moving to Nevada in 2018, Brown unsuccessfully ran for the Nevada U.S. Senate nomination in the 2022 election. He ran again in the 2024 election, this time winning the Republican nomination, but lost to Democratic incumbent Senator Jacky Rosen in the general election.

In January 2025, President Donald Trump nominated Brown to serve as Under Secretary of Veterans Affairs for Memorial Affairs. He was confirmed by the United States Senate on July 29, 2025, by a vote of 54–44, with additional support from Catherine Cortez Masto and Jacky Rosen, both Nevada Senators. Brown was sworn into office on August 1, 2025, by Secretary of Veterans Affairs Doug Collins.

Sam Brown is sworn in as Under Secretary of Veterans Affairs for Memorial Affairs by Secretary Doug Collins, with his wife Amy Brown holding the Bible, July 31, 2025.

== Early life and family ==
Brown was born in Arkansas into a military family; his father and two younger brothers also served in the war on terror after the September 11 attacks. He was educated at the United States Military Academy at West Point and graduated in 2006. He also holds a Master of Business Administration (MBA) from Southern Methodist University.

== Military service ==
After completing his training at the United States Army Infantry School, Ranger School, and Airborne School, Brown joined 3rd Brigade Combat Team, 1st Infantry Division at Fort Hood, Texas.

In 2008, he was deployed to Kandahar, Afghanistan, where he served as an infantry Platoon Leader. In September 2008, while supporting the multinational cooperative project of delivering a turbine to the Kajaki Dam, he and his soldiers were wounded by an improvised explosive device when responding to another US Army unit that was ambushed and in a direct fire.

U.S. Army officer Sam Brown with a group of Afghan children during his deployment to Afghanistan in 2008.

As a result, thirty percent of Brown's body was burned, and he lost his left index finger. He was evacuated and was taken to Brooke Army Medical Center in San Antonio, Texas.

Brown's recovery from the burn wounds and experimental pain management solutions were covered by multiple media outlets. He was a participant in medical studies using virtual reality to reduce pain during physical therapy sessions. His physical therapy was a long and painful process that lasted several years.

U.S. Army officer Sam Brown during his deployment to Afghanistan in 2008.

In 2011, Brown retired as a Captain from the U.S. Army. In 2012, he returned to Afghanistan to provide inspiration to US troops deployed there, and to have a chance for a "proper exit."

== Civilian career ==
In 2012, Brown founded Palisade Strategies, a firm that provides critical medications to veterans when Veterans Affairs hospitals and clinics could not.

After earning an MBA from Southern Methodist University, Brown moved to Reno in 2018 and worked as an operations manager at an Amazon fulfillment center.

Brown sold the business in 2022.

== Political campaigns ==
In 2014, Brown ran in the Republican primary for the District 10 seat in the Texas House of Representatives. He finished in third place with 27.5% of the vote.

In 2021, Brown launched his campaign to become a US Senator from Nevada. His campaign drew national attention, both from media and fundraisers. He raised over $1 million every quarter of his campaign as he challenged Adam Laxalt, a Republican who was endorsed by Donald Trump for the US Senate seat.

Sam and Amy Brown, 2022

Brown received the support and endorsement of local and state political party leaders, but lost in the primary election, receiving 34% of the vote to Laxalt's 56%.

After this loss, Brown formed the Duty First PAC. As of August 2023, the Duty First PAC had spent most of the contributions it had received to repay debts from Brown’s 2022 campaign, with 7% of its spending going to other Republican candidates.

=== 2024 U.S. Senate campaign ===
Brown with U.S. Senator Lindsey Graham at a campaign event in Las Vegas in 2024

In July 2023, Brown announced his second candidacy for a Nevada U.S. Senate seat, this time challenging incumbent Democrat Jacky Rosen in the 2024 election. His Republican challengers for the Republican nomination included former Trump administration Ambassador to Iceland Jeff Gunter, former Nevada State Representative Jim Marchant, and ten other candidates. His campaign was endorsed by U.S. Republican senators Steve Daines of Montana and Marsha Blackburn of Tennessee.

In February 2024, Brown's wife, Amy, spoke about an abortion she had in Texas just prior to meeting her husband. Sam Brown opposes a federal abortion ban and supports Nevada's current law that legally protects the right to an abortion. Brown had previously supported a 2013 Texas law banning abortion after 20 weeks that did not provide exceptions for rape or incest.

In June 2024, Trump endorsed Brown in the Republican primary. Brown was a featured speaker at the 2024 Republican National Convention in Milwaukee, speaking on unity and the high cost of war.

Sam Brown presents President Donald Trump with a piece of the body armor he was wearing when he was wounded by an IED in Afghanistan, at Mar-a-Lago in November 2024.

During Trump's nomination acceptance speech on the final night of the convention, Trump praised Brown, saying: "[Brown] paid the biggest price probably ever paid by anybody that is running for office, and I think he is going to do great." Brown was the only 2024 U.S. Senate candidate mentioned by Trump during his speech.

Despite Trump winning the state of Nevada in the concurrent presidential election, Brown was defeated by Rosen, receiving 46.2% of the vote to Rosen's 47.9%.

== Author ==
In 2024, Brown and his wife, Amy Brown, co-authored the memoir Alive Day: Finding Hope and Purpose After Losing Everything, which recounts Brown's military service, his injuries in Afghanistan and subsequent recovery. In December 2024, Brown discussed and read from the book at the Richard Nixon Presidential Library and Museum, followed by a question-and-answer session and book signing. The event was subsequently featured by C-SPAN's Book TV.

== Under Secretary of Veterans Affairs for Memorial Affairs ==
In his capacity as Under Secretary of Veterans Affairs for Memorial Affairs, Brown has overseen the expansion of the National Cemetery Administration’s efforts to increase access to burial benefits for veterans and their families across the United States.

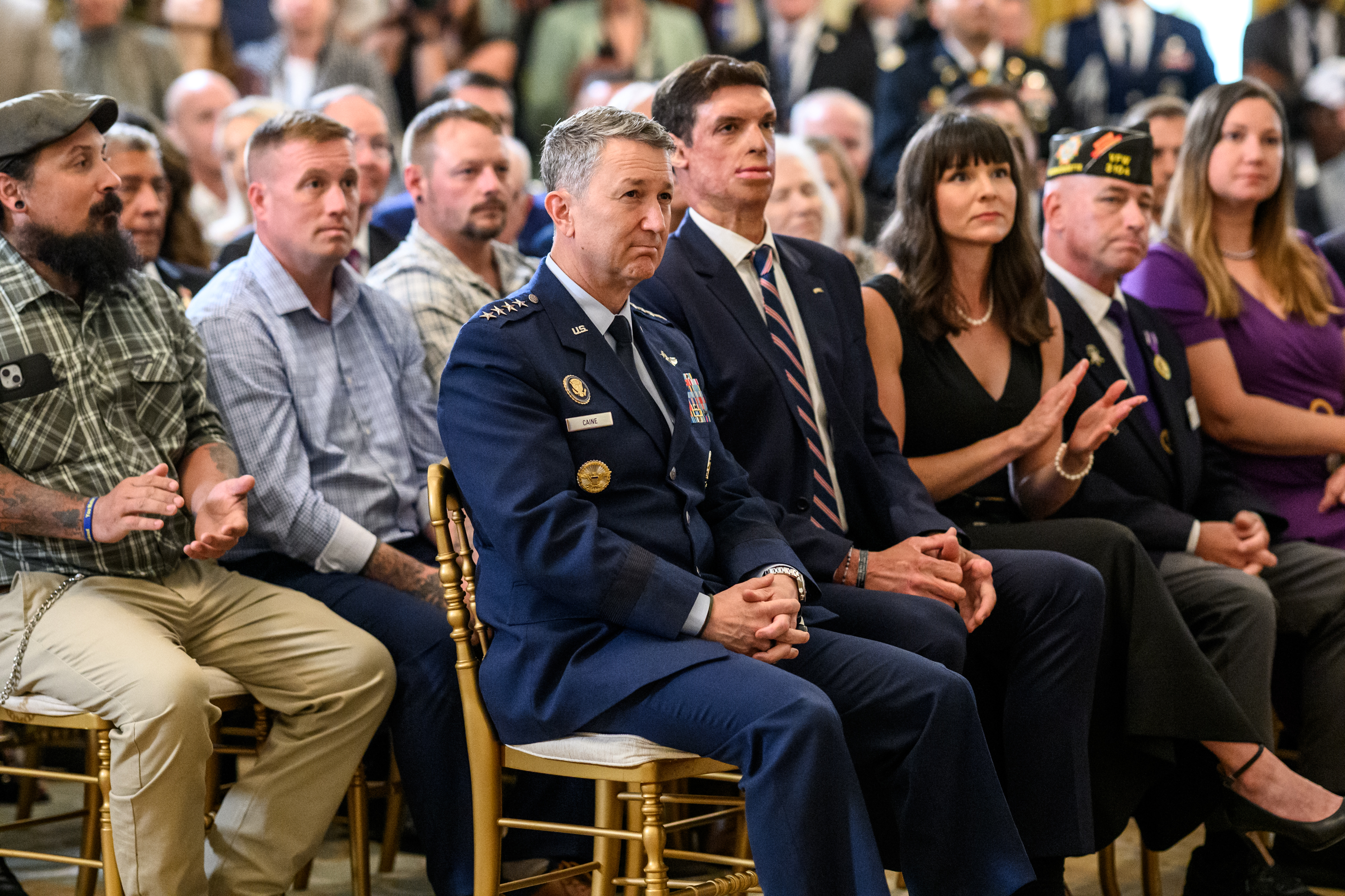
Brown with Chairman of the Joint Chiefs of Staff General Dan Caine in August 2025

On September 10, 2025, he delivered keynote remarks at the dedication of the Southern Utah National Cemetery in Cedar City, the first national cemetery constructed in Utah and the 157th within the VA system. The 8.14-acre site, developed from land acquired in 2018, is designed to accommodate approximately 15,000 interments at an estimated rate of 200 per year.

VA Under Secretary for Memorial Affairs Sam Brown participates in the dedication of Southern Utah National Cemetery on September 10, 2025.

During the ceremony, Brown emphasized the cemetery’s symbolic importance to veterans and their communities, stating that “this is not about the numbers … it’s about people, service, and sacrifice.” He credited Utah’s congressional delegation and local leaders for their role in advancing the project and reaffirmed the VA’s commitment to ensuring that “America does not forget her heroes.”

Brown has also outlined priorities focused on expanding awareness of burial benefits for eligible veterans, improving geographic access to national cemeteries, and modernizing the National Cemetery Administration’s technology systems. Speaking at the American Legion’s 2025 Washington Conference, Brown noted that the administration aims to provide burial access within 75 miles for approximately 95 percent of eligible veterans nationwide. He also highlighted ongoing expansion through the NCA’s Rural Initiative, which establishes smaller national cemeteries in underserved regions, and called for modernization of legacy scheduling and records systems used to manage burial operations.

U.S. Department of Veterans Affairs Under Secretary Samuel B. Brown meets with Federated States of Micronesia Secretary of Foreign Affairs Ricky F. Cantero and delegation members in Palikir, August 2026.

In August 2026, Brown traveled to Pohnpei, Federated States of Micronesia, to participate in the Micronesian Islands Forum, where he met with regional leaders and veterans who had served in the U.S. military. During the visit, he met with FSM President Wesley Simina, attended a memorial ceremony honoring Micronesian citizens killed while serving in the U.S. Armed Forces, and toured Pohnpei State Hospital. Brown also announced that the VA was developing a proposal to extend certain health care reimbursements, telehealth services, mail-order pharmaceuticals, and beneficiary travel assistance to eligible service-connected veterans in the Freely Associated States, subject to agreements with the respective governments and other regulatory and operational requirements.

VA Under Secretary for Memorial Affairs Sam Brown works alongside National Cemetery Administration employees during a cemetery field visit in 2025.

On September 4, 2026, Brown delivered the keynote address at the dedication of Elko National Cemetery in Elko, Nevada. The cemetery became the 158th national cemetery operated by the VA and the first VA national cemetery in Nevada. Built as part of the National Cemetery Administration's Rural Initiative, it is intended to serve more than 3,700 veterans and eligible family members living within 75 miles of Elko. In his remarks, Brown described the cemetery as the eighth constructed under the Rural Initiative and emphasized the program's goal of improving burial access for veterans in rural areas.

== Nonprofit activity ==
Brown followed his 2022 campaign for U.S. Senate by becoming the chairman of the Nevada Faith and Freedom Coalition, a political non-profit organization. The state chapter's efforts focused on "combating human trafficking, advocating for meaningful criminal justice reform, and supporting the devastated communities recovering from the COVID-19 shutdowns."

== Personal life ==
Brown is a member of the Cherokee Nation.

In May 2009, Brown married Amy Larsen, an Army first lieutenant from South Dakota and critical care dietitian who worked in the Department of Defense Burn Center at Brooke Army Medical Center in San Antonio.

Brown and his family have lived in Reno, Nevada, since 2018 and are active members at their church, Calvary Chapel Reno-Sparks.

== Bibliography ==
- Brown, Sam; Brown, Amy (September 4, 2024). Alive Day: Finding Hope and Purpose After Losing Everything. Houndstooth Press. ISBN 9781544546018.

== Awards and decorations ==
Brown's awards and decorations include:

Combat Infantryman Badge
Bronze Star Medal	Purple Heart	Army Commendation Medal with Combat "V" device and oak leaf cluster
National Defense Service Medal	Afghanistan Campaign Medal	Global War on Terrorism Service Medal
Army Service Ribbon	Overseas Service Ribbon	NATO Medal

In addition, Brown has been awarded the Ranger tab and Parachutist Badge.

Brown was inducted into the Northwood University Gallery of Distinction.

In 2026, Brown received the Edward J. Bronars Defender of Freedom Award from Freedom Alliance.

Party political offices
Preceded by Dean Heller	Republican nominee for U.S. Senator from Nevada (Class 1); 2024	Most recent
Political offices
Preceded by Ronald E. Walters; Acting	Under Secretary of Veterans Affairs for Memorial Affairs; 2025–present	Incumbent
