= Robin L. Higgins =

American government official (born 1950)

Robin Higgins
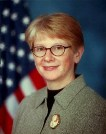

Under Secretary of Veterans Affairs for Memorial Affairs
- In office May 24, 2001 – September 1, 2002
- President: George W. Bush
- Preceded by: Mike Walker
- Succeeded by: Jack Nicholson

Personal details
- Born: December 23, 1950 (age 75) New York City, New York, U.S.
- Spouse: William R. Higgins (m. 1969; died 1990)
- Children: 1
- Education: State University of New York, Oneonta (BA); Long Island University (MA)

Robin Lee Higgins (born December 23, 1950) is a former Under Secretary for Memorial Affairs in the United States Department of Veterans Affairs and a retired Lieutenant Colonel in the United States Marine Corps.

== Early life and education ==
A native of the Bronx, New York, Higgins graduated from North Shore High School in Glen Head, and received a bachelor's degree from State University of New York at Oneonta, and a master's degree from C.W. Post College of Long Island University. She also studied at Hebrew University in Jerusalem.

== Career ==
Higgins is a 20-year veteran of the United States Marine Corps, retiring as a lieutenant colonel.

During the George H. W. Bush administration, Higgins was appointed Deputy Assistant Secretary and Acting Assistant Secretary for Veterans' Employment and Training at the U.S. Department of Labor. While there, she served on the Department of Veterans Affairs Advisory Committee on Women Veterans and the Department of Defense's Defense Conversion Commission.

Florida Governor Jeb Bush appointed Higgins as executive director of the Florida Department of Veterans Affairs in January 1999.

On April 30, 2001, President George W. Bush nominated Higgins to the post of Under Secretary for Memorial Affairs. She was confirmed by the Senate on May 24, 2001. The Undersecretary for Memorial Affairs runs the National Cemetery Administration. Higgins left the position on September 1, 2002.

== Personal life ==
Higgins is the widow of Colonel William Richard Higgins, a Marine Corps officer taken captive by terrorists in Lebanon in 1988, and later murdered. Higgins and his wife, Robin, have one daughter, Christine Higgins Tabaka (born 1970). Since then, she has become a speaker on surviving adversity and terrorism and has written a book, Patriot Dreams: The Murder of Colonel Rich Higgins.

Higgins' awards include the U.S. Department of Veterans' Affairs Exceptional Service Award, Marine Corps League’s Dickey Chapelle Award, American Legion Auxiliary's Public Spirit Award, and American Academy of Physician Assistants Veterans Caucus Award.

In May 2003, she was granted an honorary Doctorate of Humane Letters from the State University of New York.
