= John W. Nicholson =

United States Army general

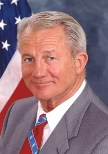

Secretary of the American Battle Monuments Commission
- In office January 20, 2005 – 2009
- President: George W. Bush
- Preceded by: John P. Herrling
- Succeeded by: Max Cleland

Under Secretary of Veterans Affairs for Memorial Affairs
- In office April 11, 2003 – January 19, 2005
- President: George W. Bush
- Preceded by: Robin L. Higgins
- Succeeded by: William F. Tuerk

Personal details
- Born: February 22, 1934 (age 92) Struble, Iowa, U.S.
- Children: General John W. Nicholson Jr.
- Education: United States Military Academy (BA); University of Pennsylvania (MPA)

Military service
- Allegiance: United States
- Branch/service: United States Army
- Years of service: 1956–1986
- Rank: Brigadier general
- Battles/wars: Vietnam War

John William "Jack" Nicholson Sr. (born February 22, 1934) is an American retired Brigadier General of the United States Army who was appointed secretary of the American Battle Monuments Commission (ABMC) by President George W. Bush in January 2005.

== Biography ==
Prior to this appointment, he served as Under Secretary for Memorial Affairs in the Department of Veterans Affairs, where he directed the National Cemetery Administration.

Born and raised in Iowa, he is a 1956 graduate of the United States Military Academy at West Point, New York, where he received the General MacArthur Leadership Award for his class, and holds a master's degree in public administration from the University of Pennsylvania. He is an airborne ranger combat infantryman and served two and one-half years with infantry units in Vietnam. Other overseas assignments during his 30-year Army career included duty in Germany, Korea, Lebanon and Switzerland. Recommended for a Silver Star for action in Vietnam, the award was approved in 2009.

He currently serves on the board of advisors of the Code of Support Foundation, a nonprofit military service organization.

He is the brother of Jim Nicholson, a former Secretary of Veterans Affairs and Chair of the Republican National Committee. His son John W. Nicholson Jr. is a 1982 graduate of West Point and was the U.S. Army general in charge of the Resolute Support Mission in Afghanistan for more than 2 years. Nicholson Sr. and his wife Sophie have five children and thirteen grandchildren.

== Silver Star action ==
"On Dec. 27, 1963, then Maj. Nicholson was serving as an advisor to the South Vietnamese Regional Forces and South Vietnamese Popular Force. During an eight-hour battle, their force was reduced from 200 to 40, and Nicholson directed friendly fire and mortar fire to help evacuate 13 wounded soldiers through enemy territory."

== Awards and decorations ==
Combat Infantryman Badge
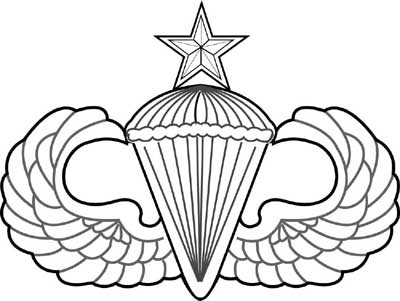
Senior Parachutist Badge
Ranger tab
Joint Chiefs of Staff Identification Badge
Army Staff Identification Badge
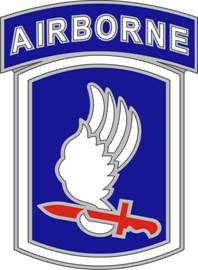
173rd Airborne Brigade Combat Team Combat Service Identification Badge
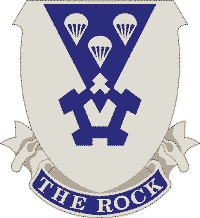
503rd Infantry Regiment Distinctive Unit Insignia
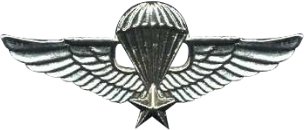
Vietnamese Parachutist Badge
? Overseas Service Bars

Army Distinguished Service Medal
Silver Star
Defense Superior Service Medal
Legion of Merit with one bronze oak leaf cluster
Bronze Star Medal with "V" device and three oak leaf clusters
Meritorious Service Medal
Air Medal with V Device and bronze award numeral 48
Army Commendation Medal
National Defense Service Medal
Armed Forces Expeditionary Medal with one bronze service star
Vietnam Service Medal with two service stars
Korea Defense Service Medal
Army Service Ribbon
Army Overseas Service Ribbon
Vietnam Army Distinguished Service Order, 2nd class
Vietnam Gallantry Cross with two palms
Republic of Vietnam Gallantry Cross Unit Citation
Vietnam Campaign Medal
