= John W. Nicholson Jr. =

U.S. Army general

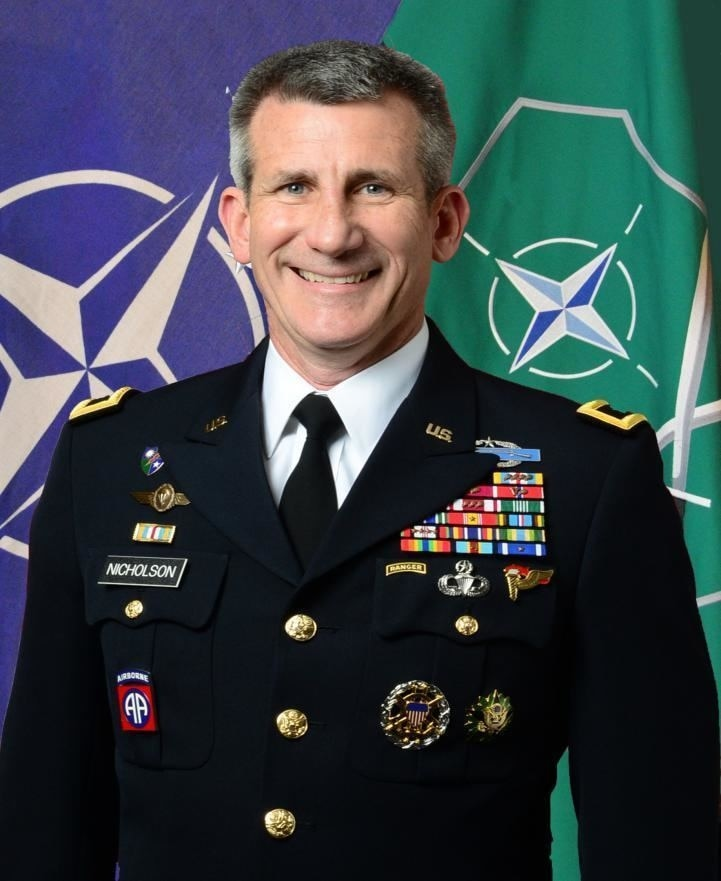
- Official portrait, 2016
- Born: May 8, 1957 (age 69); Baltimore, Maryland
- Relatives: Brigadier General John W. Nicholson (father)
- Military career
- Allegiance: United States
- Branch: United States Army
- Service years: 1982–2018
- Rank: General
- Commands: Resolute Support Mission; United States Forces Afghanistan; Allied Land Command; 82nd Airborne Division; 1st Battalion, 23rd Infantry Regiment
- Conflicts: United States invasion of Grenada; War in Afghanistan
- Awards: Defense Distinguished Service Medal (2); Army Distinguished Service Medal; Defense Superior Service Medal (5); Legion of Merit (3); Bronze Star Medal (2)

John William "Mick" Nicholson Jr. (born 8 May 1957) is a retired United States Army four-star general who last commanded U.S. Forces – Afghanistan (USFOR-A) and the 41-nation NATO-led Resolute Support Mission from 2 March 2016 to 2 September 2018, succeeding General John F. Campbell. He was the longest-serving commander of NATO forces in Afghanistan until 2021, having been the senior officer in theatre for 2 years, 6 months. He was previously commanding general, Allied Land Command from October 2014 and commander of the 82nd Airborne Division. Nicholson is the son of John W. "Jack" Nicholson, also a retired general officer in the United States Army, and is distantly related to British brigadier general John Nicholson.

== Early life and education ==
Growing up, Nicholson attended Gilman School where he was known as "Nick". Over the years, this nickname gradually became "Mick". In 1982, he graduated from West Point (like his father had before him) and was commissioned into the infantry.

== Career ==
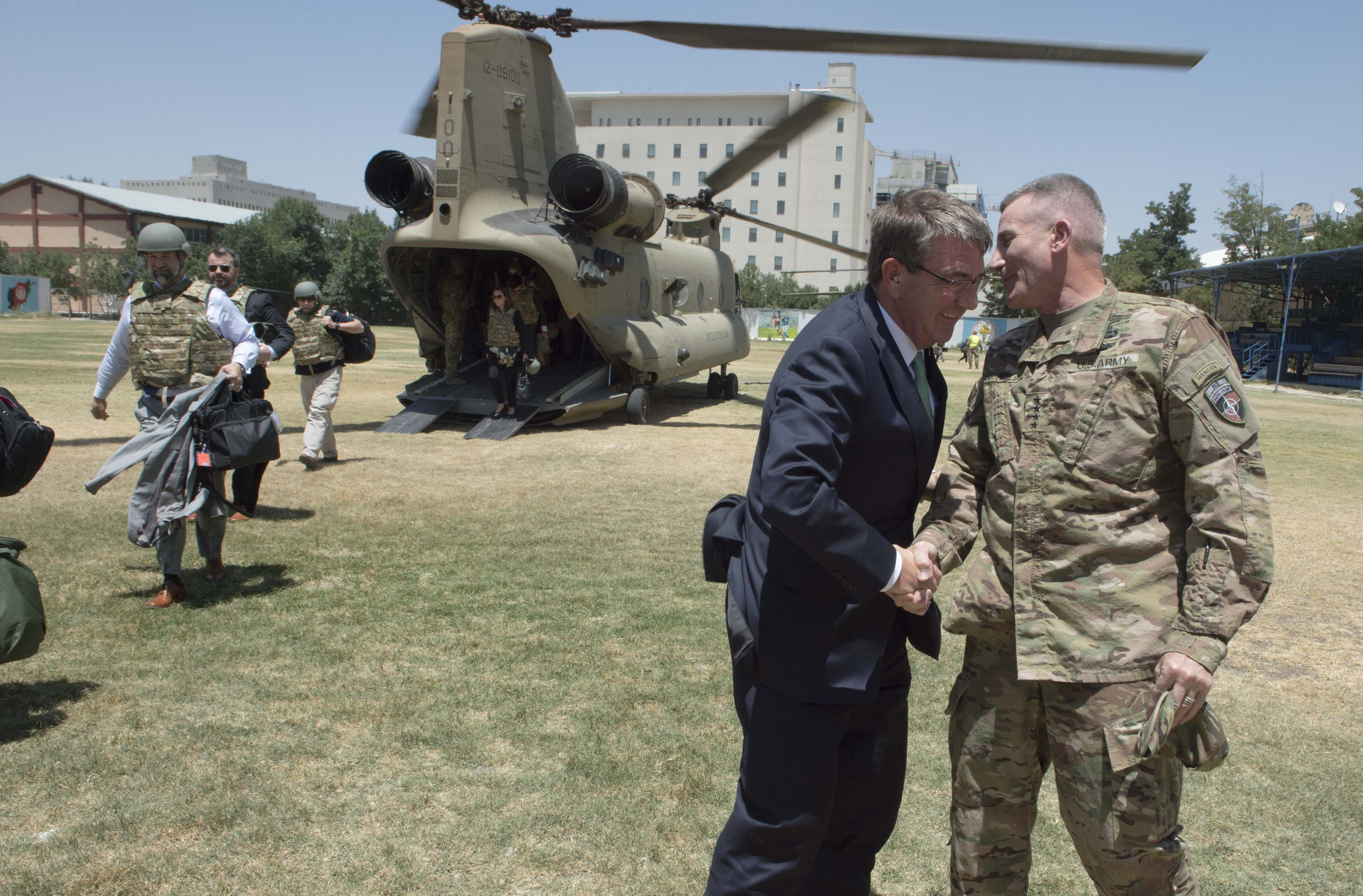
Nicholson greets U.S. Secretary of Defense Ash Carter, Kabul, 12 July 2016

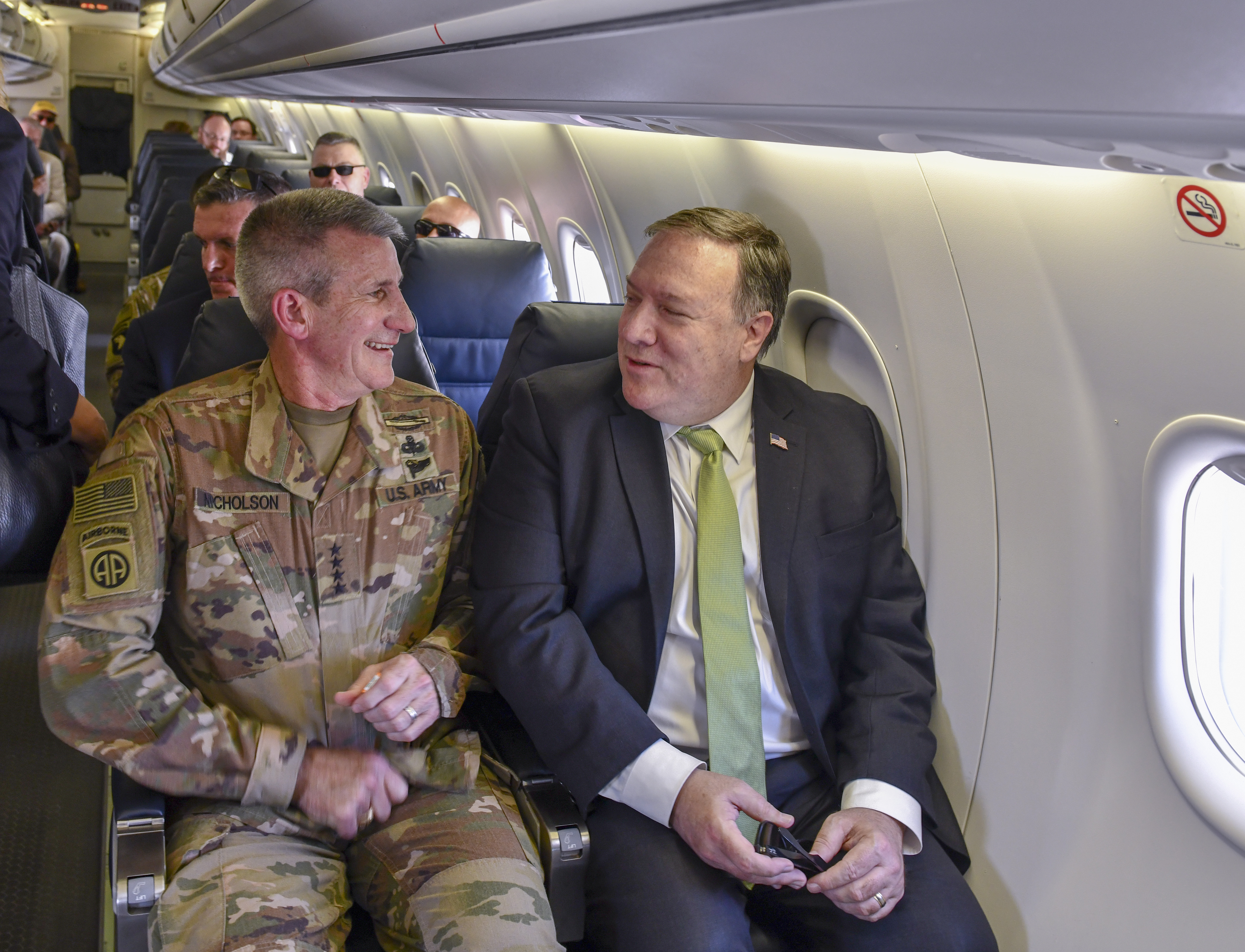
Nicholson speaks with U.S. Secretary of State Mike Pompeo in July 2018

Shortly after his commissioning, he was assigned to the 82nd Airborne and deployed during the invasion of Grenada in 1983 where he earned a Bronze Star Medal with "V" device.

Nicholson was a strategist for General Eric Shinseki when the 9/11 attacks occurred. He went on to serve in Afghanistan for six years. He commanded companies in the 82nd Airborne Division and the 75th Ranger Regiment. He was a major in the 3rd Infantry Division in Germany and later served in IFOR/SFOR in Sarajevo, Bosnia Hercegovina. As a lieutenant colonel he commanded the Army's first Stryker Infantry Battalion, 1st Bn 23rd Infantry “Tomahawks”, at Fort Lewis, Washington. As a colonel, he commanded the 3rd Brigade Combat Team “Spartans” of the 10th Mountain Division.

Nicholson was the deputy director of the Joint Improvised Explosive Device Defeat Organization. He became commander of the 82nd Airborne Division in 2012. In 2014 Nicholson took control of the NATO Allied Land Command in İzmir, Turkey.

=== Commander in Afghanistan ===
Nicholson was the longest-serving commander of the War in Afghanistan, having led the 41-nation NATO-led Resolute Support Mission and United States Forces-Afghanistan for two and a half years from March 2016 to September 2018. Nicholson told the Senate Armed Services Committee in 2016 that "Since 9/11, the U.S. campaign in Afghanistan has largely defined my service." He assumed command from General John F. Campbell on 2 March 2016. Nicholson was given command of the Resolute Support Mission in Afghanistan, amid a worsening security situation. Nicholson apologized in person for U.S. involvement in the Kunduz hospital airstrike.

His command spanned the Obama and Trump administrations. During the final year of the Obama administration in 2016, the U.S. conducted a strike in Pakistan which killed the Taliban Emir Mullah Mansoor, made more extensive use of U.S. air support to Afghan forces, and received an increase in US force levels at the close of 2016.

In April 2017, he authorized the dropping of the Massive Ordnance Air Blast (MOAB), the largest non-nuclear munition in the US inventory, on an ISIS strongpoint in the Pekha Valley of Nangarhar Province, Afghanistan. Afghan ground forces requested the airstrike when they were unable to enter the area because of IS attacks from multiple tunnels. The MOAB destroyed the IS strongpoint and enabled a successful offensive push deep into IS-held terrain.

During the first eight months of the Trump Administration in 2017, his recommendations were incorporated into the South Asia Strategy which was announced by Trump on 17 August 2017. The strategy resulted in a pressure campaign on the enemy and their sponsors.

On 2 September 2018, Nicholson relinquished command of the NATO-led Resolute Support Mission to General Austin Scott Miller at a ceremony in Kabul, Afghanistan. At the ceremony, Nicholson was praised as a “warrior-diplomat”. His leadership and close relations with Afghan leaders were key to brokering the first universal ceasefire of the war in June 2018 and helped enable the launch of the subsequent peace initiative. He had met with Afghan president Ashraf Ghani every week and the two of them "worked well together."

Nicholson has testified before the following Congressional Committees: The House Committee on Oversight and Government Reform, the Senate Committee on Foreign Relations, and the Senate Armed Services Committee. He participated in numerous sessions of the NATO North Atlantic Council, to include the Ambassadors to NATO, Chiefs of Defense, Defense Ministers, Foreign Ministers, and Heads of State of the Alliance.

In 2017, as the commanding general in Afghanistan, Nicholson, drew attention when he said in a press conference that his command “continued to get reports of” Russian assistance to the Taliban, including weapons — something that was the subject of internal debate within the intelligence community at the time but appears to have been validated by media reporting in July 2020.

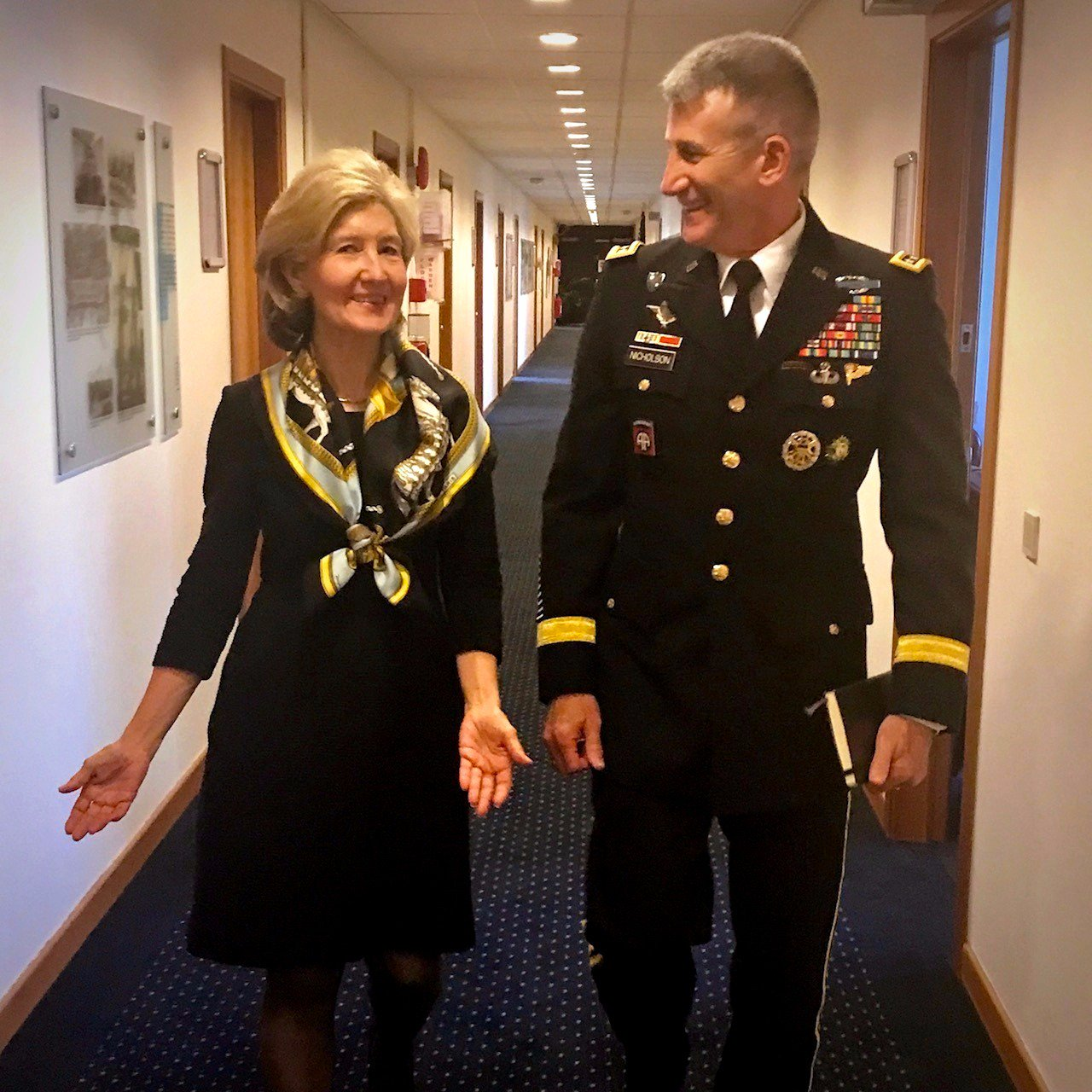
John Nicholson Jr. and Bailey Hutchison at NATO

=== Post-military career ===
Nicholson is an adjunct faculty member on leadership with Harvard University's John F. Kennedy School and is a member of Harvard's Belfer Center's Elbe Group, which sustains a Track Two dialogue between retired American and Russian senior officials in the military and intelligence fields.

In April 2019, Nicholson joined the PenFed Foundation for Military Heroes as its president.

On 12 May 2019, Nicholson received the Knight Commander's Cross, Great Cross with Star on the 70th anniversary of the Berlin Airlift from then Germany Defense Minister Ursula von der Leyen.

On 18 May 2019, Nicholson gave the commencement address to the 2019 graduating class of Institute of World Politics and received an Honorary Degree of Doctor of Law.

On 17 June 2019, Nicholson was given an Honorary Degree of Doctor of Humane Letters by the American University of Afghanistan alongside David M. Rubenstein and General (Ret.) David Petraeus.

On 10 September 2019, Nicholson gave a presentation on war and leadership to students and faculty at the American University of Paris. On 21 February 2020, Nicholson was the closing speaker at the St. Petersburg Conference on World Affairs. On 17 October, Nicholson was the keynote speaker for the unveiling of the statue The Pledge, which honors women in the military, at the Military Women's Memorial at Arlington National Cemetery. On 28 October, it was announced that Nicholson would receive the 2020 Outstanding Service Award from Canine Companions for Independence (CCI).

=== Corporate leadership ===
Since December 2021, Nicholson has been Chief Executive of Lockheed Martin in the Middle East, with responsibility for strategy, operations, and growth in the UAE, Bahrain, Kuwait, Qatar, Oman, Jordan, Lebanon, Iraq, and Pakistan.

In October 2022, Nicholson was appointed to the Board of Trustees of Khalifa University, a public co-educational institution based in Abu Dhabi, United Arab Emirates.

In November 2022, Nicholson was included in the Top 10 on Forbes Middle East's Global Meets Local list. The list ranked business executives leading operations for the world's largest companies in the Middle East & North Africa (MENA) region, based on factors such as the impact and scope of their role, business size, personal achievements, and public recognition.

== Awards and decorations ==
Combat Infantryman Badge (Second Award)
Ranger tab
Master Parachutist Badge
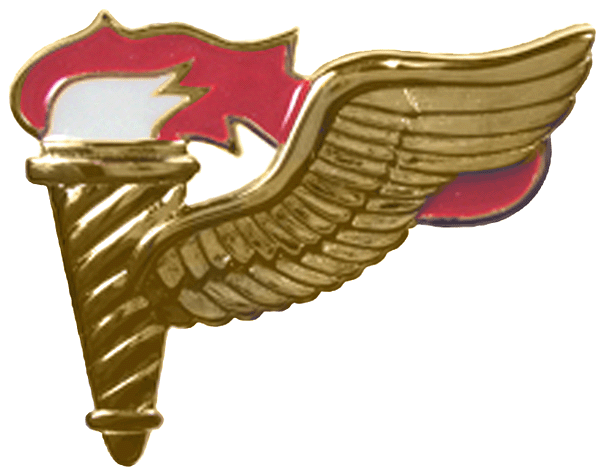
Pathfinder Badge
Office of the Joint Chiefs of Staff Identification Badge
Army Staff Identification Badge
82nd Airborne Division Combat Service Identification Badge

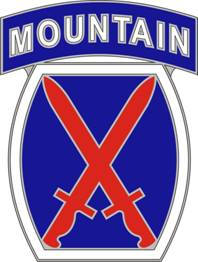

10th Mountain Division Combat Service Identification Badge
75th Ranger Regiment Distinctive Unit Insignia
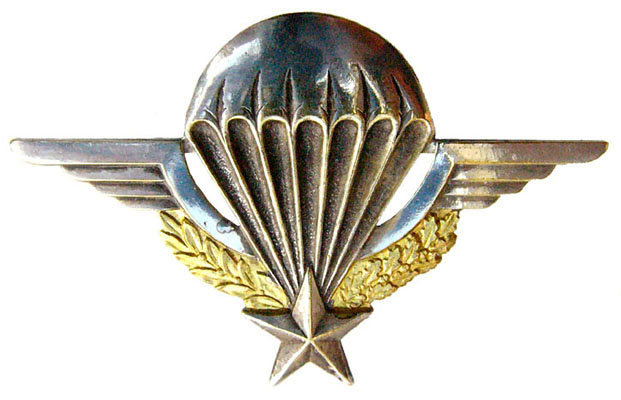
French Parachutist Badge
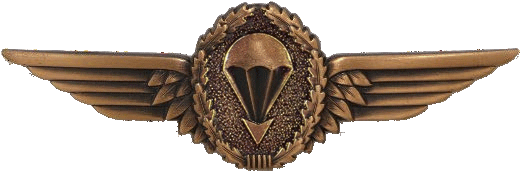
German Parachutist badge in bronze

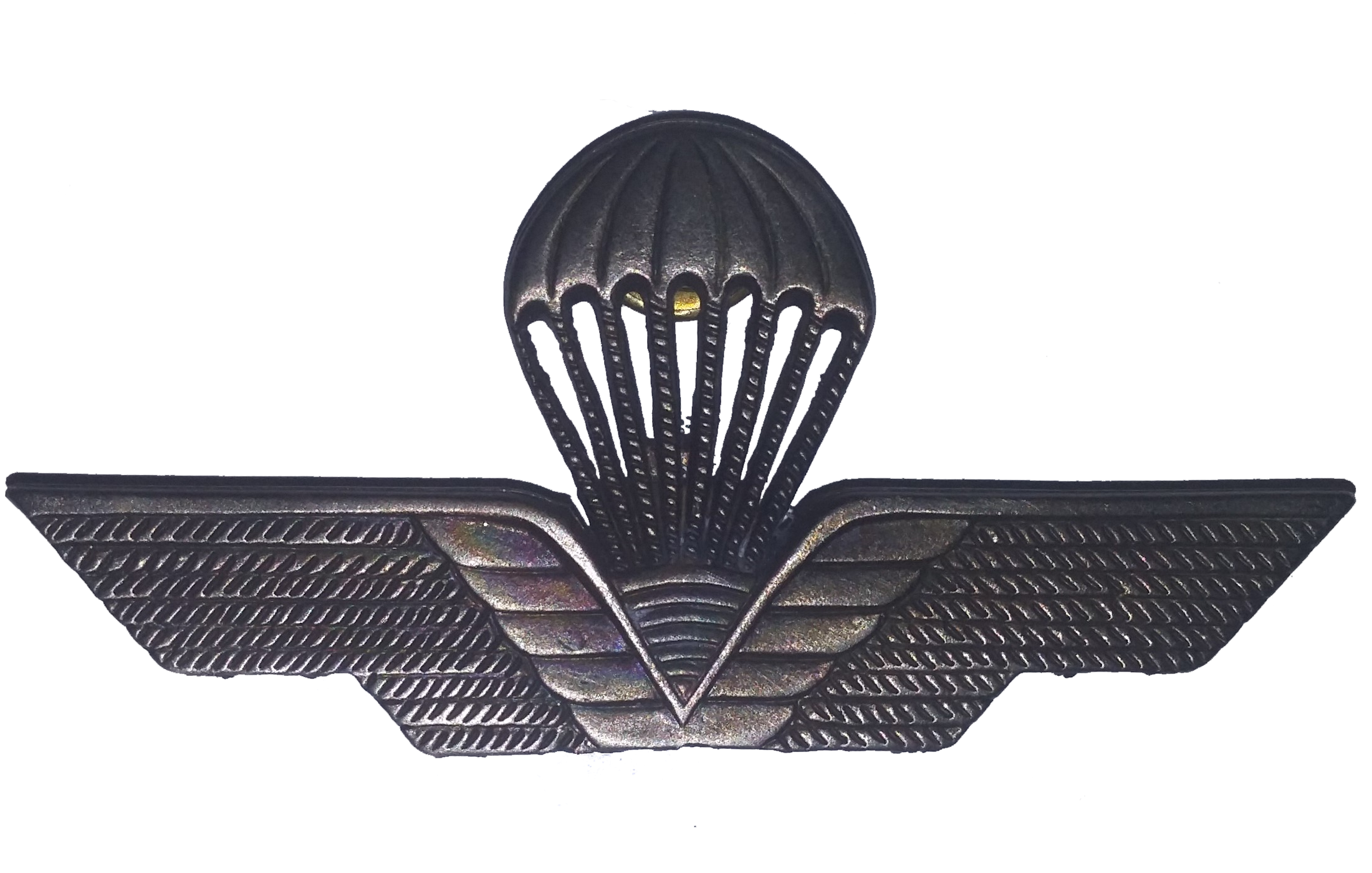

Italian Parachutist Badge

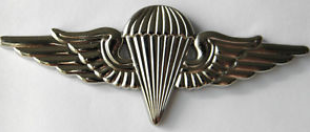

Egyptian Parachutist Badge
12 Overseas Service Bars

Defense Distinguished Service Medal with one bronze oak leaf cluster
Army Distinguished Service Medal with one bronze oak leaf cluster
Defense Superior Service Medal with four oak leaf clusters
Legion of Merit with two oak leaf clusters
Bronze Star Medal with "V" Device and oak leaf cluster (one award for Valor)
Defense Meritorious Service Medal
Meritorious Service Medal with three oak leaf clusters
Army Commendation Medal
Army Achievement Medal with oak leaf cluster
Joint Meritorious Unit Award with oak leaf cluster
Army Meritorious Unit Commendation
National Defense Service Medal with one bronze service star
Armed Forces Expeditionary Medal
Afghanistan Campaign Medal with four service stars
Global War on Terrorism Service Medal
Armed Forces Service Medal
Army Service Ribbon
Army Overseas Service Ribbon with bronze award numeral 4
NATO Meritorious Service Medal
NATO Medal for former Yugoslavia and Afghanistan with service star
Order of Merit of the Federal Republic of Germany, Knight Commander's Cross

French Légion d'honneur, Chevalier

Polish Afghanistan Star

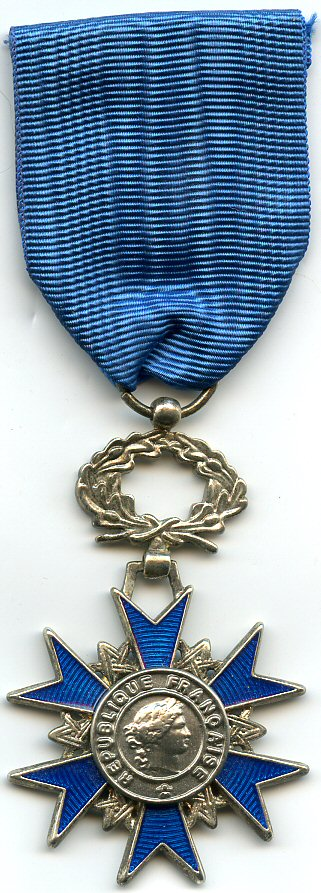

French National Order of Merit
