= Dave Welch (admiral) =

Retired U.S. Navy admiral

David A. Welch
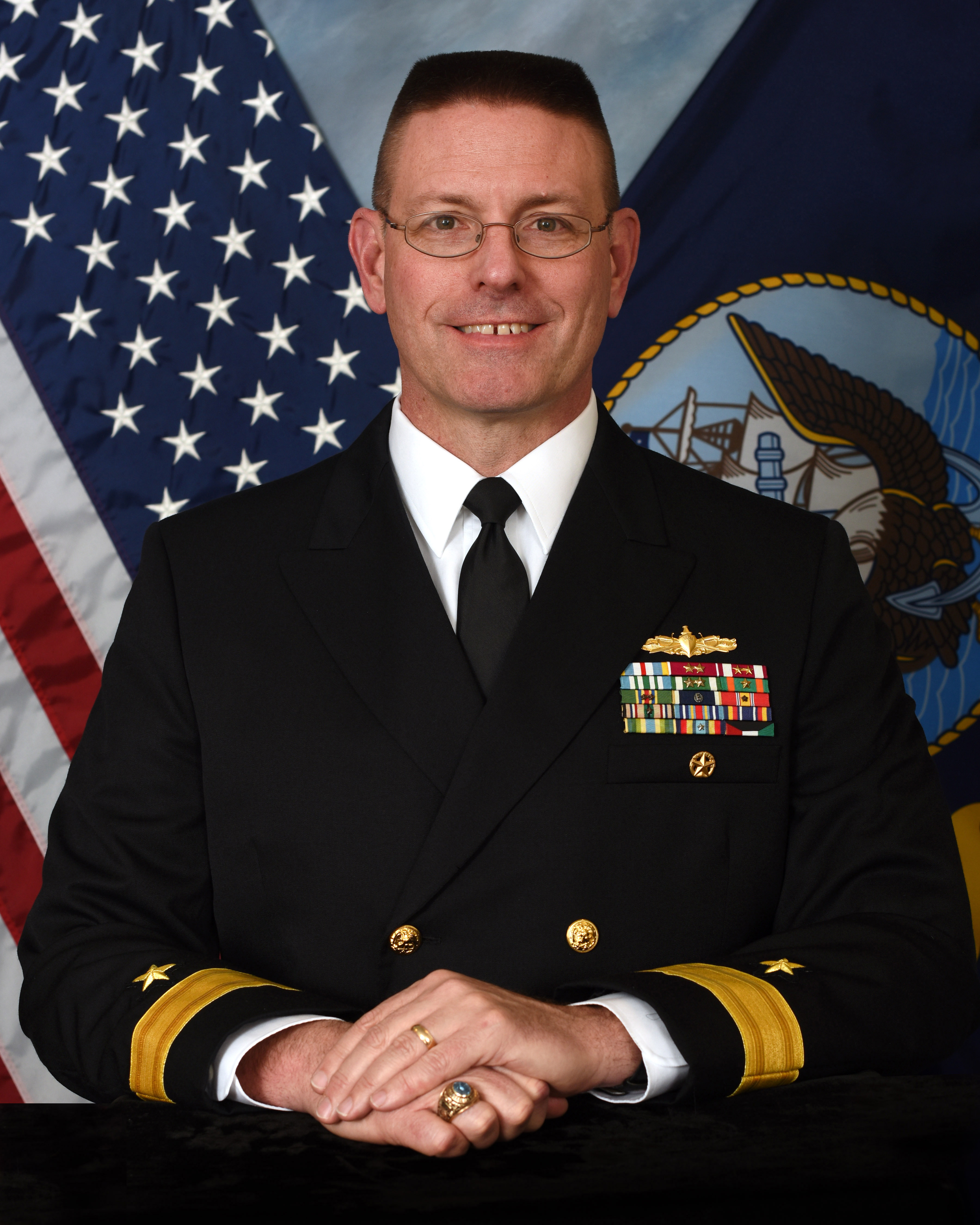
- Born: 1961 (age 64–65); Peoria, Illinois, U.S.
- Education: United States Naval Academy (BS); Naval Postgraduate School (MA); Massachusetts Institute of Technology
- Children: 4
- Military career
- Allegiance: United States
- Branch: United States Navy
- Service years: 1987–2021
- Rank: Rear Admiral (lower half)
- Nickname: Dave
- Commands: Carrier Strike Group 15; Naval Surface and Mine Warfighting Development Center; Surface Warfare Officers School Command; Destroyer Squadron 31; USS Chung-Hoon (DDG-93)
- Awards: Defense Superior Service Medal; Legion of Merit (3)

David Andrew Welch (born 1961) is a retired United States Navy rear admiral and surface warfare officer who last served as the 74th commander of Carrier Strike Group 15 from June 13, 2019 to June 11, 2021. He previously served as the 3rd commander of the Naval Surface and Mine Warfighting Development Center from May 8, 2018 to May 31, 2019, with command tours as commodore of Destroyer Squadron 31 from January 2011 to July 2012 and commanding officer of USS Chung-Hoon (DDG-93) from September 2005 to April 2007. He also served on the staff of the Office of the Chief of Naval Operations as Director of International Engagement from December 2017 to April 2018.

A native of Peoria, Illinois, Welch is a graduate of Limestone Community High School. He received his commission from the United States Naval Academy in 1987, where he earned a B.S. degree in English. He earned an M.A. degree in National Security Affairs from the Naval Postgraduate School in Monterey, California in 1994, and was a 2014 fellow in the Massachusetts Institute of Technology Seminar 21 program. He and his wife Mercedes have four children, two of whom (sons Benjamin and Geoffrey) are also in the Navy.

He retired from the Navy in June 2021 after 34 years of service.

== Awards and decorations ==
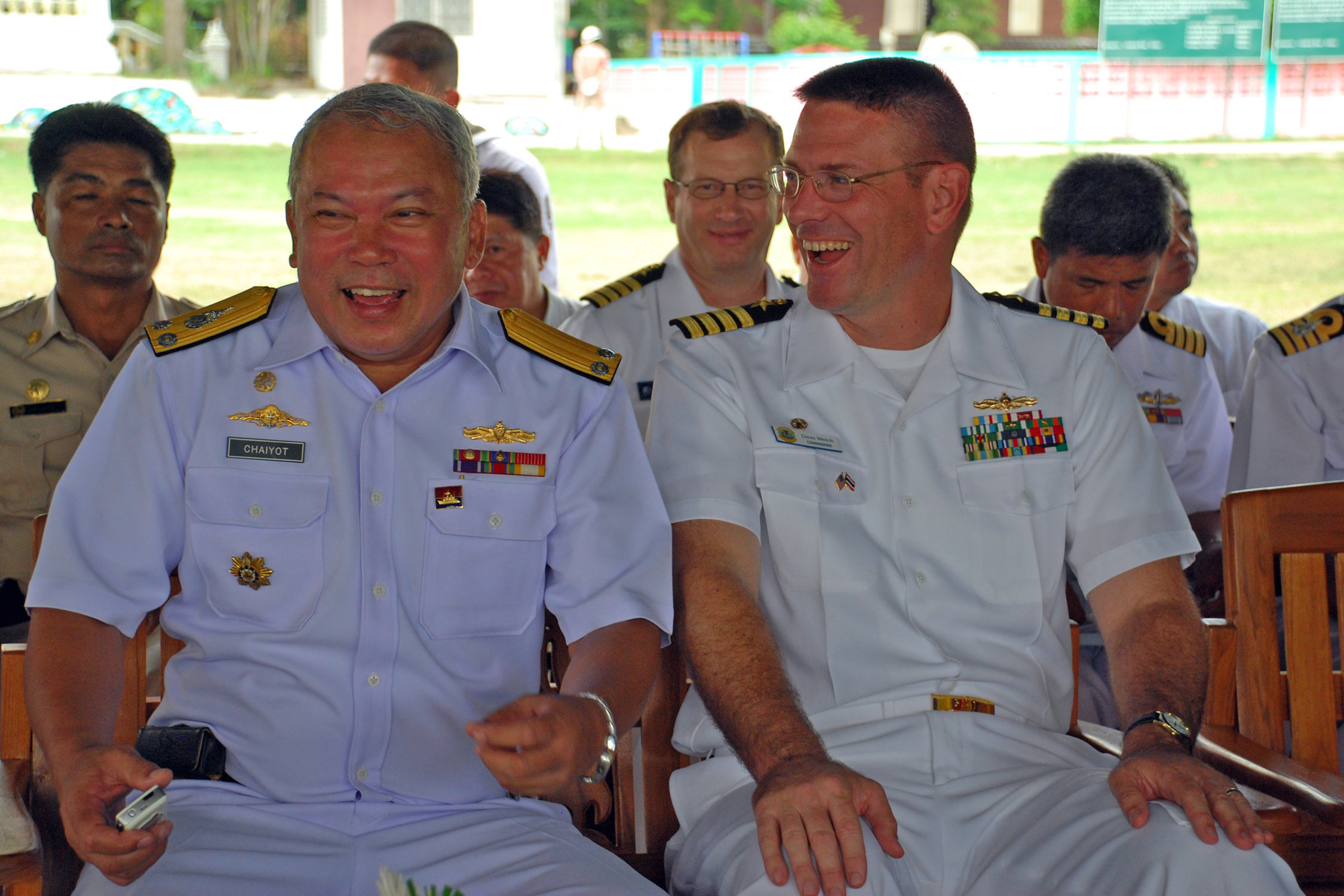
Royal Thai Navy Rear Adm. Chaiyot Sundaranaga, left, commander of Frigate Squadron 2, and Capt. David Welch, commander of Task Group 73.1, share a laugh before the dedication for a Cooperation Afloat Readiness and Training (CARAT) Thailand 2011 engineering project.

Surface Warfare Officer Pin
Defense Superior Service Medal	Legion of Merit with two award stars	Meritorious Service Medal with two award stars
Joint Service Commendation Medal	Navy and Marine Corps Commendation Medal with two award stars	Navy and Marine Corps Achievement Medal with two award stars
Navy Meritorious Unit Commendation with two bronze service stars	Navy "E" Ribbon, 4th award	National Defense Service Medal with bronze service star
Southwest Asia Service Medal with bronze service star	Global War on Terrorism Expeditionary Medal	Global War on Terrorism Service Medal
Armed Forces Service Medal	Navy Sea Service Deployment Ribbon with silver service star	Kuwait Liberation Medal (Kuwait)
Command at Sea insignia

Military offices
Preceded by Kenneth L. Williams Jr.	Commanding Officer of USS Chung-Hoon (DDG-93); 2005–2007	Succeeded by James A. Aiken Jr.
Preceded by Richard L. Clemmons Jr.	Commodore of Destroyer Squadron 31; 2011–2012	Succeeded by Wallace G. Lovely
Preceded by John F.G. Wade	Commander of the Naval Surface and Mine Warfighting Development Center; 2018–2019	Succeeded by Scott F. Robertson
Preceded by William D. Byrne Jr.	Commander of Carrier Strike Group 15; 2019–2021	Succeeded by James A. Kirk
