= James A. Kirk =

U.S. Navy admiral

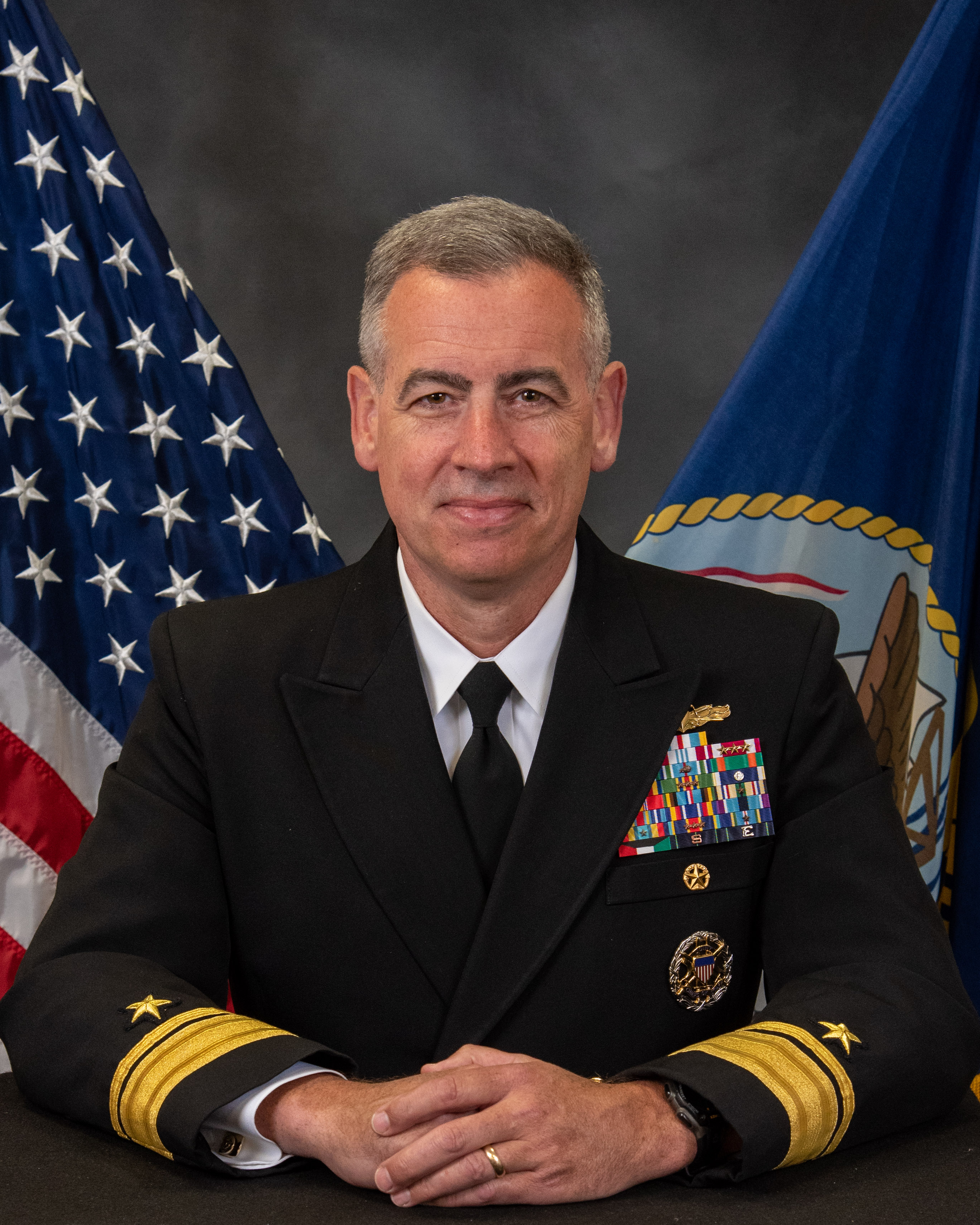
- Official portrait, 2021
- Nicknames: "Jim" "Tiberius"
- Born: 1967 (age 58–59); Hershey, Pennsylvania, U.S.
- Branch: United States Navy
- Service years: 1990–2023
- Rank: Rear Admiral
- Commands: Expeditionary Strike Group 3; Naval Surface Force Pacific; Carrier Strike Group 15; Carrier Strike Group 11; USS Zumwalt (DDG-1000); USS De Wert (FFG-45)
- Awards: Defense Superior Service Medal; Legion of Merit
- Education: United States Naval Academy (BS); Naval War College (MA); United States Army War College (MA)

James Adam Kirk (born 1967) is a retired United States Navy rear admiral and surface warfare officer who last served as the commander of Expeditionary Strike Group 3 from November 18, 2022 to June 9, 2023. He previously served as a special assistant to the Commander, Naval Surface Force Pacific from June 2022 to November 2022; commander of Carrier Strike Group 15 from June 2021 to June 2022; and deputy commander and chief of staff for Joint Warfare Centre, Allied Command Transformation in Stavanger, Norway.

As a captain, Kirk was the first commanding officer of USS Zumwalt, commissioned in 2014. Kirk's name often elicits comparison to Star Trek's James T. Kirk.

== Naval career ==
Kirk graduated from the U.S. Naval Academy Class 1990. He has attended both the U.S. Naval War College and U.S. Army War College graduating with Masters in National Security Studies.

He has served in a variety of afloat and ashore billets as a Surface Warfare officer. He has served afloat on destroyers, cruisers, frigates and staffs including USS Fife (DD-991), USS The Sullivans (DDG-68), USS Hué City (CG-66), USS John S. McCain (DDG-56), gas turbine inspector on the staff of Commander, United States Pacific Fleet, and operations officer for Carrier Strike Group 7. He has commanded both USS De Wert (FFG-45), and USS Zumwalt (DDG-1000).

Ashore, Kirk has served as executive assistant to the Navy's Chief of Legislative Affairs, action officer on the Joint Staff J8, executive assistant to the director of Surface Warfare (OPNAV N96), and deputy for Weapons and Sensors to the director of Surface Warfare (OPNAV N96). As a flag officer, he served as deputy commander and chief of staff for Joint Warfare Center, Allied Command Transformation in Stavanger, Norway; and as commander, Carrier Strike Group Eleven. Kirk assumed command of Carrier Strike Group Fifteen in June 2021.

In October 2022, Kirk was selected for reassignment as the commander of Expeditionary Strike Group Three.

== Awards and decorations ==

Joint Chiefs of Staff Badge
Surface Warfare Officer Pin
Defense Superior Service Medal w/ 1 bronze oak leaf cluster
Legion of Merit	Defense Meritorious Service Medal	Meritorious Service Medal w/ 3 gold award star
Navy and Marine Corps Commendation Medal w/ 4 gold award star	Joint Service Achievement Medal w/ 1 oak leaf cluster	Navy and Marine Corps Achievement Medal
Navy Unit Commendation	Navy Meritorious Unit Commendation w/ 3 bronze service stars	Navy E Ribbon w/ 4th_award
National Defense Service Medal w/ 1 service star	Armed Forces Expeditionary Medal	Southwest Asia Service Medal w/ 1 service star
Global War on Terrorism Expeditionary Medal	Global War on Terrorism Service Medal	Humanitarian Service Medal
Navy Sea Service Deployment Ribbon w/ 3 service star	Overseas Service Ribbon w/ 3 service star	Special Operations Service Ribbon w/ 1 service star
Kuwait Liberation Medal (Kuwait)	Navy Sharpshooter Rifle Ribbon	Navy Expert Pistol Medal
Command at Sea insignia

Military offices
New command	Commanding Officer of USS Zumwalt (DDG-1000); 2013–2016	Succeeded by Scott A. Tait
Preceded by David A. Welch	Commander of Carrier Strike Group 15; 2021–2022	Succeeded by Joseph F. Cahill III
Preceded by Wayne M. Baze	Commander of Expeditionary Strike Group 3; 2022–2023	Succeeded by Randall W. Peck
