= Robert T. Moeller =

United States admiral (1951–2011)

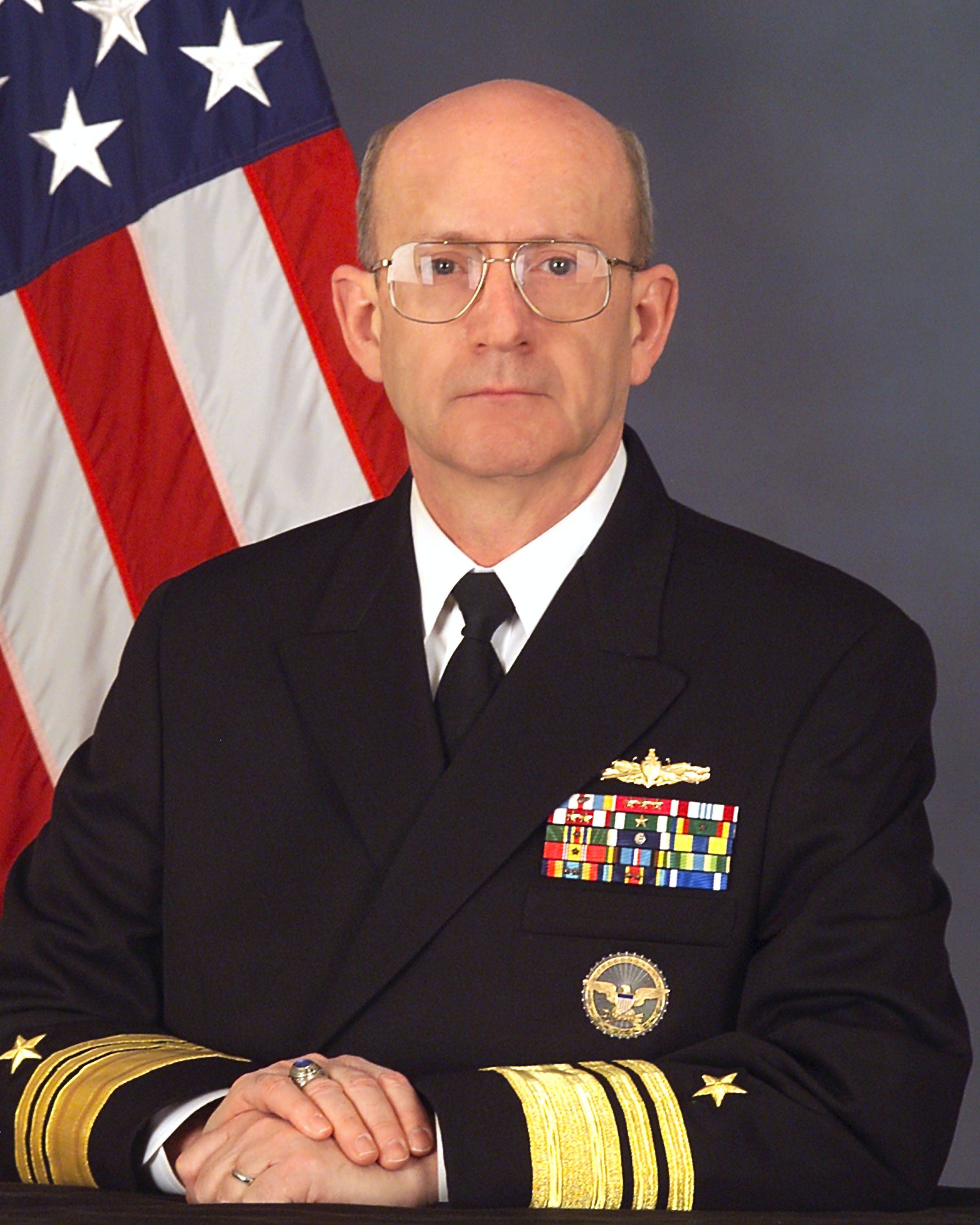
- Born: February 24, 1951; Toms River, New Jersey, United States
- Died: March 28, 2011 (aged 60); Washington DC
- Military career
- Allegiance: United States of America
- Branch: United States Navy
- Service years: 1974–2010
- Rank: Vice admiral
- Commands: Deputy to the Commander for Military Operations, U.S. Africa Command; Director, Strategy, Plans and Policy; Special Assistant to the Commander, U.S. Central Command; Cruiser Destroyer Group 1 Ronald Reagan Strike Group; Deputy Chief of Staff for Operations, Plans, Policy and Training; Director for Operations, Joint Task Force – 519 for the Commander, U.S. Pacific Fleet
- Conflicts: Battle of Mogadishu
- Awards: Defense Superior Service Medal; Legion of Merit (3); Meritorious Service Medal (3)

Robert Thomas Moeller (1951–2011) was a United States Navy vice admiral who last served in active duty as the first deputy to the commander for military operations, U.S. Africa Command (USAFRICOM), until his departure in April 2010. USAFRICOM was formally stood up in October 2007, as a subunified command initially of U.S. European Command, under the command of General William E. Ward, who was first commander of USAFRICOM.

Moeller, a New Jersey native and son of a World War II navy veteran, graduated from the University of Notre Dame in 1974, receiving his commission from the Notre Dame Naval Reserve Officers Training Corps program.

Trained as a surface warfare officer, Moeller served in a variety of sea and shore assignments, including joint duty. At sea, his assignments included USS Albany (CG-10), flagship for commander, 2nd and 6th Fleets, where he served as Talos fire control officer and boilers officer; USS Julius A. Furer (FFG-6); combat systems and material officer on the staff of commander, Destroyer Squadron 36; USS Valley Forge (CG-50) as precommissioning engineer officer; USS Belknap (CG-26), flagship for commander, 6th Fleet, as both executive officer and later commanding officer; and USS Port Royal (CG-73) as commanding officer.

His CO tour in Belknap included initial Partnership for Peace operations, North Atlantic Treaty Organization Operation Provide Promise and Operation Deny Flight, and the first navy visits to Odesa, Ukraine and Novorossiysk, Russia. During his command of Port Royal, the ship received her third and fourth consecutive Battle E awards, and installed and employed Linebacker, the navy's first TBMD capability.

Ashore, Moeller served in the Office of the Chief of Naval Operations in the Systems Analysis Division (OP 96) as surface ASW and IUSS analyst; the Program Resource Appraisal Division (OP 91) as net assessment analyst; SECNAV Office of Program Appraisal (OPA) as surface warfare and C4I analyst; OSD's Office of Director Operational Test and Evaluation (DOT&E) as maritime warfare analyst; and commanding officer, Surface Warfare Officers School.

In 1989, Moeller was selected as the Navy Federal Executive Fellow at the Brookings Institution. He earned a master's degree in national security studies from the Edmund A. Walsh School of Foreign Service, Georgetown University.

Moeller served as deputy chief of staff for operations, plans, policy and training (N3N5N7) and as director for operations (J3), Joint Task Force (JTF) – 519 for the commander, U.S. Pacific Fleet from May 2001 through August 2003 and as Commander, Cruiser Destroyer Group 1/Commander, Ronald Reagan Strike Group from August 2003 through August 2004. Moeller served as the director of strategy, plans and policy (J5) and as special assistant to the commander, U.S. Central Command, from August 2004 through August 2007.

Moeller died on 28 March 2011 from complications of amyotrophic lateral sclerosis (Lou Gehrig's disease) and is buried at Arlington National Cemetery. His awards include:

- Defense Superior Service Medal
- Legion of Merit with two Gold Stars
- Defense Meritorious Service Medal
- Meritorious Service Medal with two Gold Stars
- Navy and Marine Corps Commendation Medal with a Gold Star

== Notes ==
Military offices
New command	Deputy to the Commander for Military Operations of the United States Africa Command; 2007–2010	Succeeded by Charles J. Leidig
