= USS Zumwalt =

Guided missile destroyer of the United States Navy

USS Zumwalt (DDG-1000)
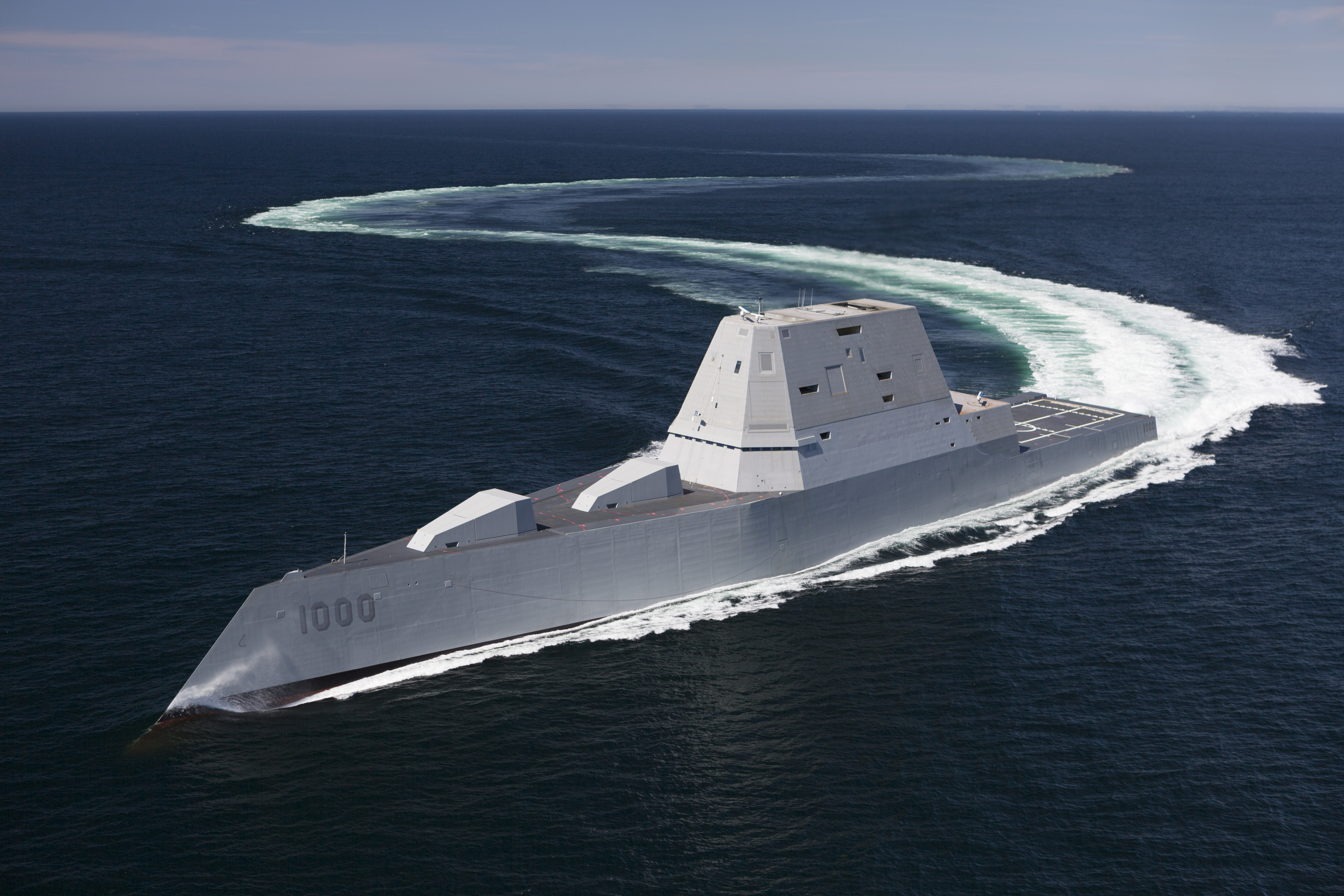
- USS Zumwalt on 21 April 2016

History

United States
- Name: Zumwalt
- Namesake: Elmo Zumwalt
- Awarded: 14 February 2008
- Builder: Bath Iron Works
- Cost: ≈$3.5 billion to 4.4 billion
- Laid down: 17 November 2011
- Launched: 28 October 2013
- Christened: 12 April 2014
- Commissioned: 15 October 2016
- Home port: NB Ventura CA
- Identification: MMSI number: 367698750; Callsign: WDI4448; Hull number: DDG-1000
- Motto: Pax Propter Vim (Peace Through Power)
- Status: in active service
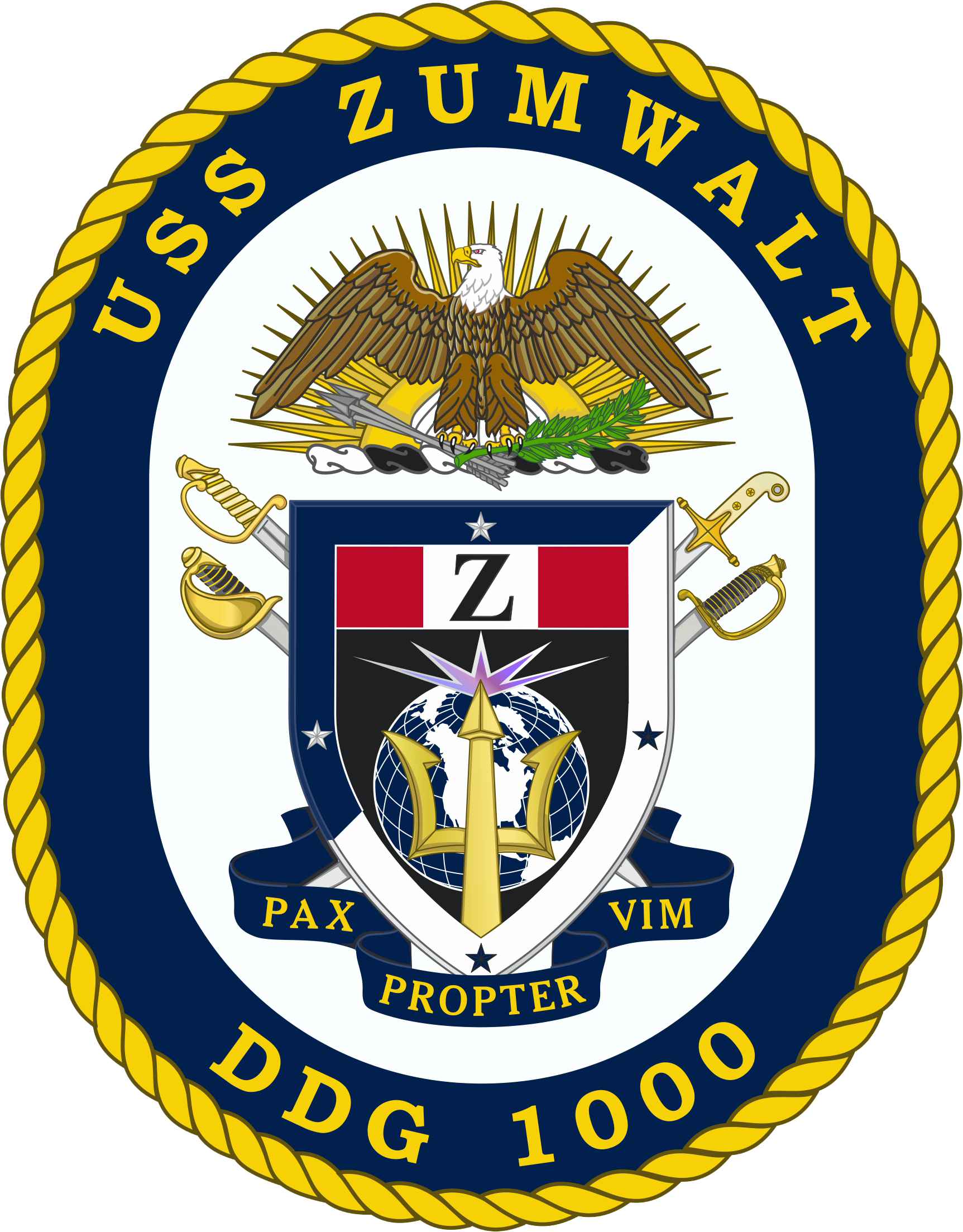
- Badge

General characteristics
- Class & type: Zumwalt-class destroyer, Guided missile destroyer
- Displacement: 14,564 long tons (14,798 t)
- Length: 600 ft (182.9 m)
- Beam: 80.7 ft (24.6 m)
- Draft: 27.6 ft (8.4 m)
- Installed power: 2 × Rolls-Royce MT30 gas turbines (35.4 MW ea.) driving Curtiss-Wright electric generators; 2 × Rolls-Royce RR4500 turbine generators (3.8 MW ea.)
- Propulsion: Integrated Power System (IPS); 2 × propellers driven by GE Power Conversion Advanced Induction Motors with VDM25000 Drive; Total: 78 MW (105,000 shp)
- Speed: 33.5 knots (62.0 km/h; 38.6 mph)
- Complement: 142
- Sensors & processing systems: AN/SPY-3 Multi-Function Radar (MFR) (X-band, scanned array); Volume Search Radar (VSR) (S-band, scanned array)
- Armament: 20 × MK 57 VLS modules, with 4 vertical launch cells in each module, 80 cells total. Each cell can hold one or more missiles, depending on the size of the missiles, including: RIM-66 Standard Missile; RIM-162 Evolved Sea Sparrow Missile (ESSM); BGM-109 Tomahawk; RUM-139 VL-ASROC; 2 × 155 mm (6.1 in) Advanced Gun System, with 920 round magazine. Unusable, no ammunition (removed) replaced by (12) C-HGB Hypersonic missiles with 3 missiles per tube.; 2 × Mk 46 30 mm (1.2 in) gun (GDLS); IRCPS
- Aircraft carried: 2 SH-60 LAMPS helicopters or 1 MH-60R helicopter; 3 MQ-8 Fire Scout VTUAV
- Aviation facilities: Hangar and helicopter flight deck for up to two medium helicopters
- Notes: Refitted in 2024, replacing AGS with IRCPS

USS Zumwalt (DDG-1000) is a guided missile destroyer of the United States Navy. She is the lead ship of the Zumwalt class and the first ship to be named after Admiral Elmo Zumwalt. Zumwalt has stealth capabilities, having a radar cross-section similar to a fishing boat despite her large size. On 7 December 2015, Zumwalt began her sea trial preparatory to joining the Pacific Fleet. The ship was commissioned in Baltimore on 15 October 2016. Her home port is San Diego, California. In late 2024, the AGS was removed and partially replaced with the IRCPS weapon system.

== Namesake ==
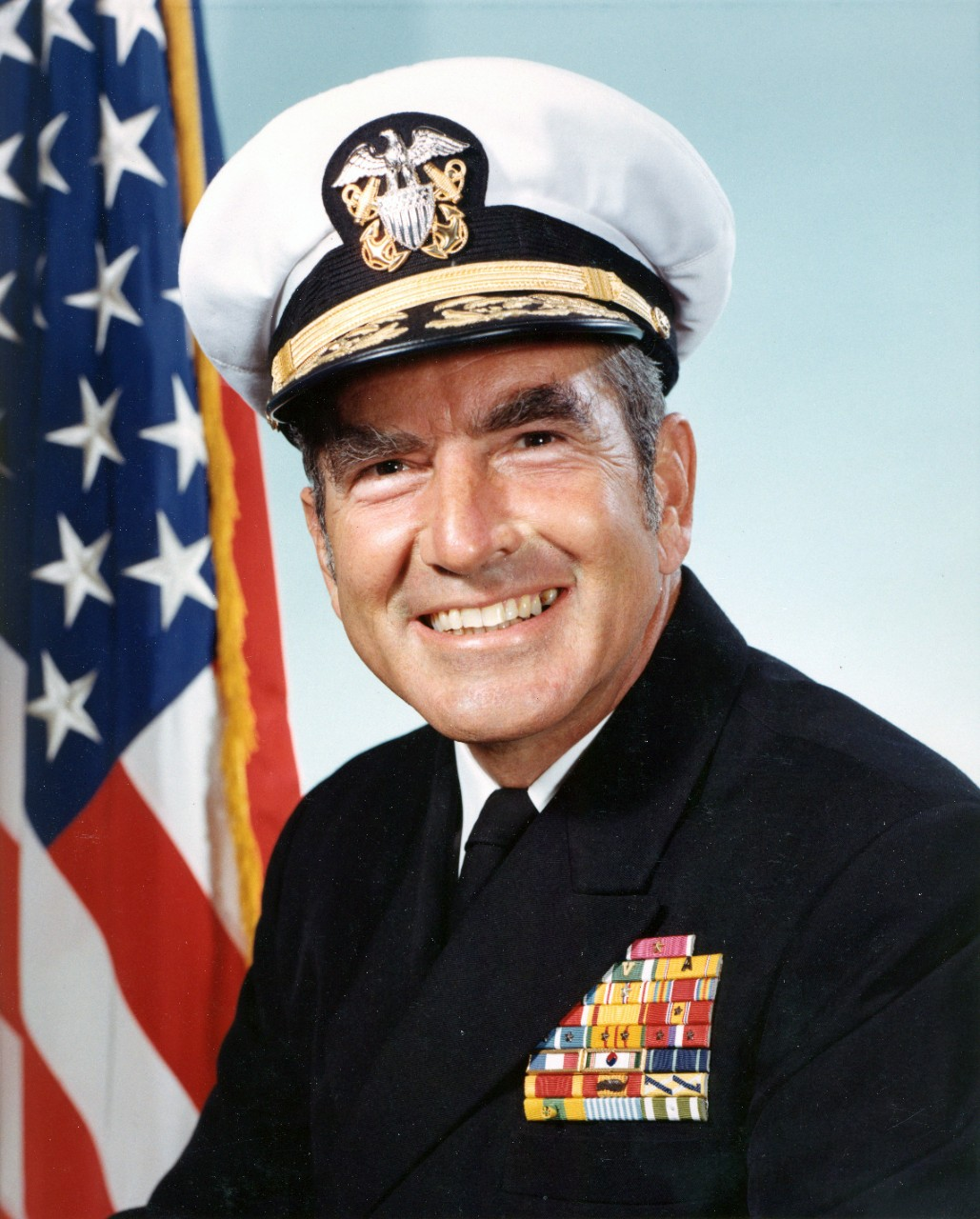
Admiral Elmo Zumwalt

Zumwalt is named after Elmo Russell Zumwalt Jr., who was an American naval officer and the youngest man to serve as the Chief of Naval Operations. As an admiral and later the 19th Chief of Naval Operations, Zumwalt played a major role in U.S. military history, especially during the Vietnam War. A highly decorated war veteran, Zumwalt reformed the US Navy's personnel policies in an effort to improve enlisted life and ease racial tensions. After he retired from a 32-year naval career, he launched an unsuccessful campaign for the United States Senate.

The hull classification symbol for Zumwalt is DDG-1000, which departs from the guided missile destroyer numbering sequence that goes up to DDG-148, which as of 2026, is Kyle Carpenter, the latest of the named Arleigh Burke-class destroyers. Zumwalt continues the previous "gun destroyer" sequence left off with 1983, DD-997, the last of the Spruance class, Hayler.

== Role ==
The Zumwalt class was designed with multimission capability. Unlike previous destroyer classes, designed primarily for deep-water combat, the Zumwalt class was primarily designed to support ground forces in land attacks, in addition to the usual destroyer missions of anti-air, anti-surface, and antisubmarine warfare.

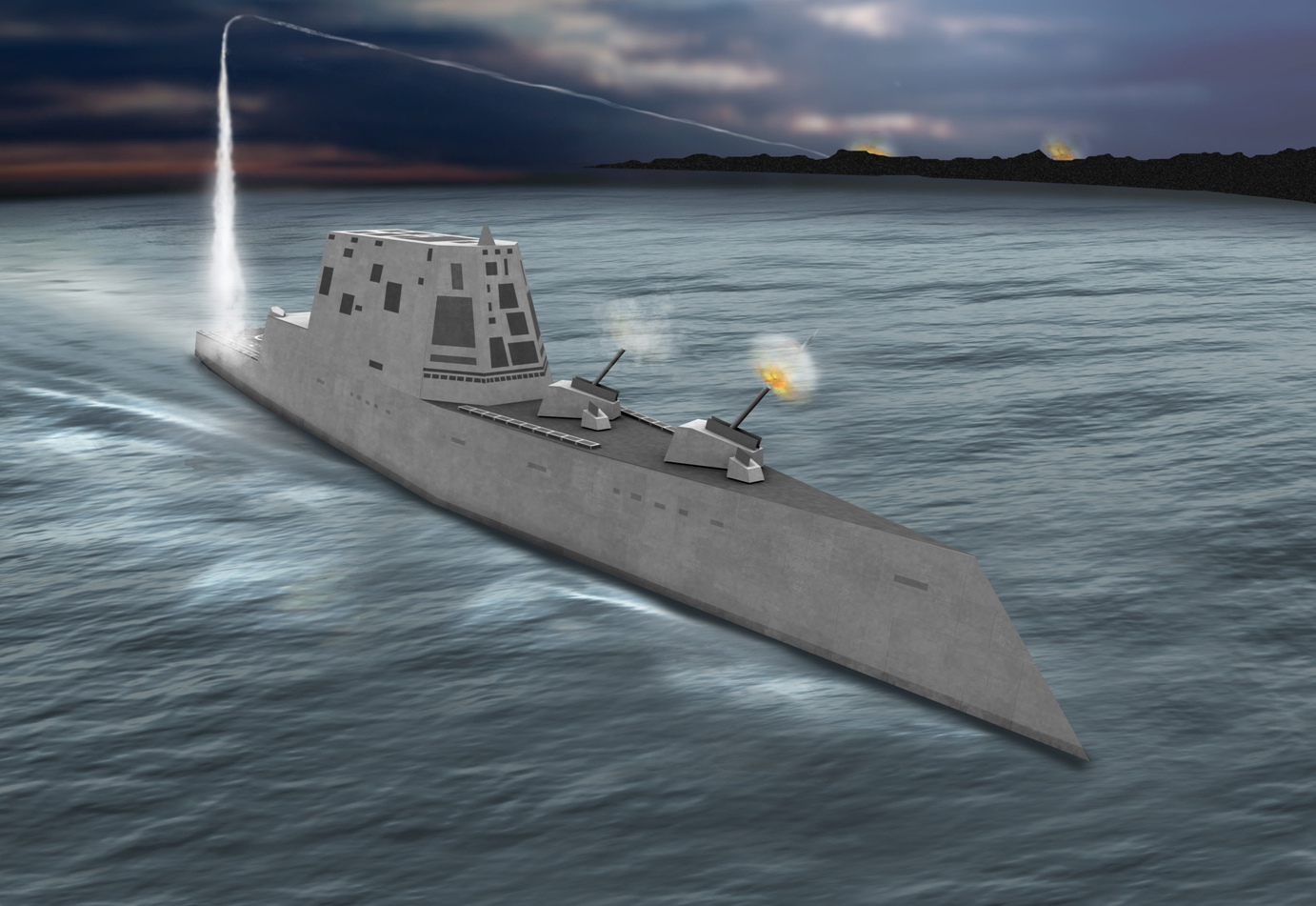
Concept art for the design

Zumwalt was initially equipped with two Advanced Gun Systems (AGS), which were designed to fire the Long Range Land Attack Projectile (LRLAP). LRLAP was to be one of a range of land attack and ballistic projectiles for the AGS, but was the only munition the AGS could use. LRLAP had a range of up to 100 nautical miles (190 km; 120 mi) fired from the AGS. It was to be a key component for ground forces support, but LRLAP procurement was cancelled in 2016 and the Navy has no plan to replace it. Since Zumwalt class cannot provide naval gunfire support the Navy has re-purposed the class to surface warfare. During a refit starting in 2023, the AGS systems are being replaced by a hypersonic missile system.

== History ==
=== Construction ===
Many of the ship's features were originally developed under the DD21 program ("21st Century Destroyer"). In 2001, Congress cut the DD-21 program by half as part of the SC21 program. To save it, the acquisition program was renamed as DD(X) and heavily reworked. The initial funding allocation for DDG-1000 was included in the National Defense Authorization Act of 2007. By February 2008, a $1.4 billion contract had been awarded to Bath Iron Works in Bath, Maine, and full rate production officially began a year later, on 11 February 2009.

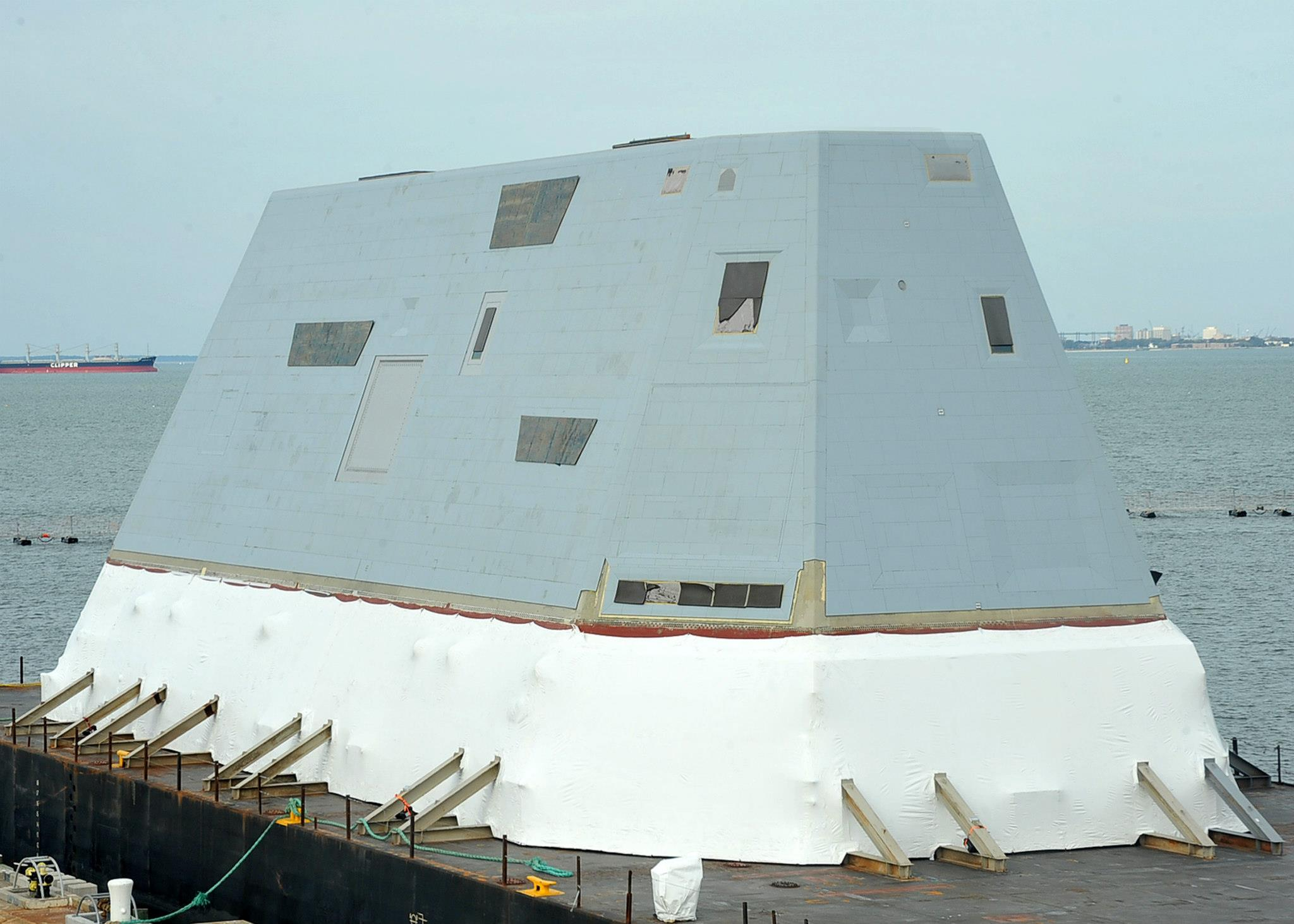
Zumwalt's deckhouse in transit on 6 November 2012

In July 2008, a construction timetable was set for General Dynamics to deliver the ship in April 2013, with a March 2015 target date for Zumwalt to meet her initial operating capability but, by 2012 the planned completion and delivery of the vessel was delayed to the 2014 fiscal year. The first section of the ship was laid down on the slipway at Bath Iron Works on 17 November 2011, by which point, fabrication of the ship was over 60% complete. The naming ceremony was planned for 19 October 2013, but was canceled due to the United States federal government shutdown of 2013. The vessel was launched on 29 October 2013.

=== Sea trials ===
In January 2014, Zumwalt began to prepare for heavy weather trials, to see how the ship and her instrumentation react to high winds, stormy seas, and adverse weather conditions. The ship's new wave-piercing inverted bow and tumblehome hull configuration reduced her radar cross-section. Tests involved lateral and vertical accelerations and pitch and roll. Later tests included fuel on-loading, data center tests, propulsion events, X-band radar evaluations, and mission systems activation to finalize integration of electronics. These all culminated in builders' trials and acceptance trials, with delivery for US Navy tests in late 2014, and with initial operating capability (IOC) to be reached by 2016.

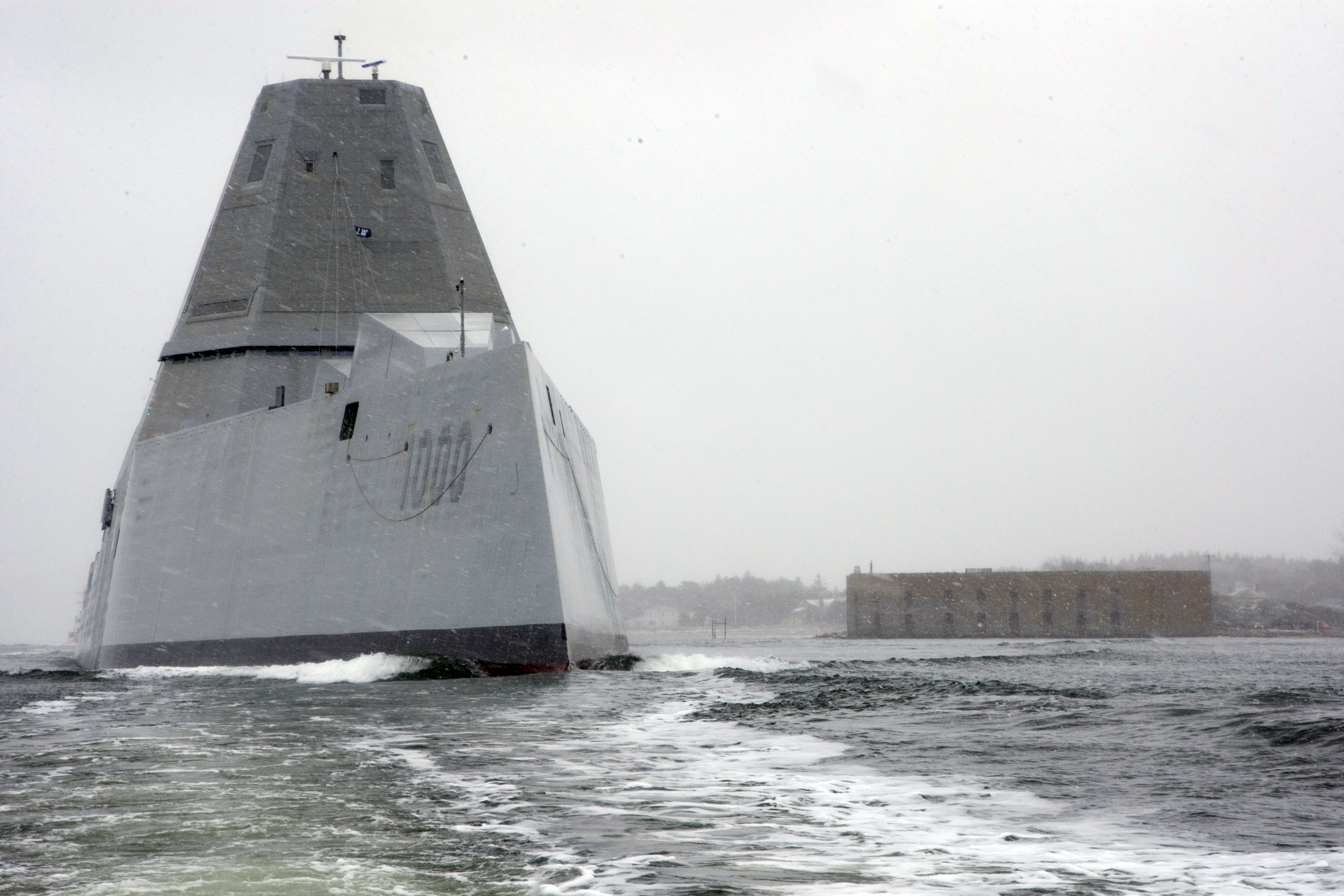
Zumwalt departs on sea trials in early 2016

Zumwalt's first commanding officer was Captain James A. Kirk. Kirk attracted some media attention when he was first named the captain, due to the similarity of his name to that of the Star Trek television character Captain James T. Kirk, played by William Shatner. Shatner wrote a letter of support to Zumwalt's crew in April 2014. On 7 December 2015, the ship departed Bath Iron Works for sea trials to allow the Navy and contractors to operate the vessel under rigorous conditions to determine whether Zumwalt was ready to join the fleet as an actively commissioned warship.

On 12 December 2015, during sea trials, Zumwalt responded to a US Coast Guard call for assistance for a fishing boat captain who was experiencing a medical emergency 40 nautical miles (74 km) from Portland, Maine. Due to the fishing boat's deck configuration, a Coast Guard helicopter was unable to hoist the patient from the fishing boat. Instead, Zumwalt's crew used their 11-meter rigid-hulled inflatable boat (RHIB) to transfer him to the destroyer, from which he was transported to shore by the Coast Guard helicopter and then to a hospital. The US Navy accepted initial delivery of Zumwalt on 20 May 2016. In September 2016, it was reported that the vessel needed repairs after the detection of a seawater leak in the ship's auxiliary motor drive oil system. The US Navy commissioned Zumwalt on 15 October 2016, in Baltimore during Fleet Week.

=== Post-commissioning ===
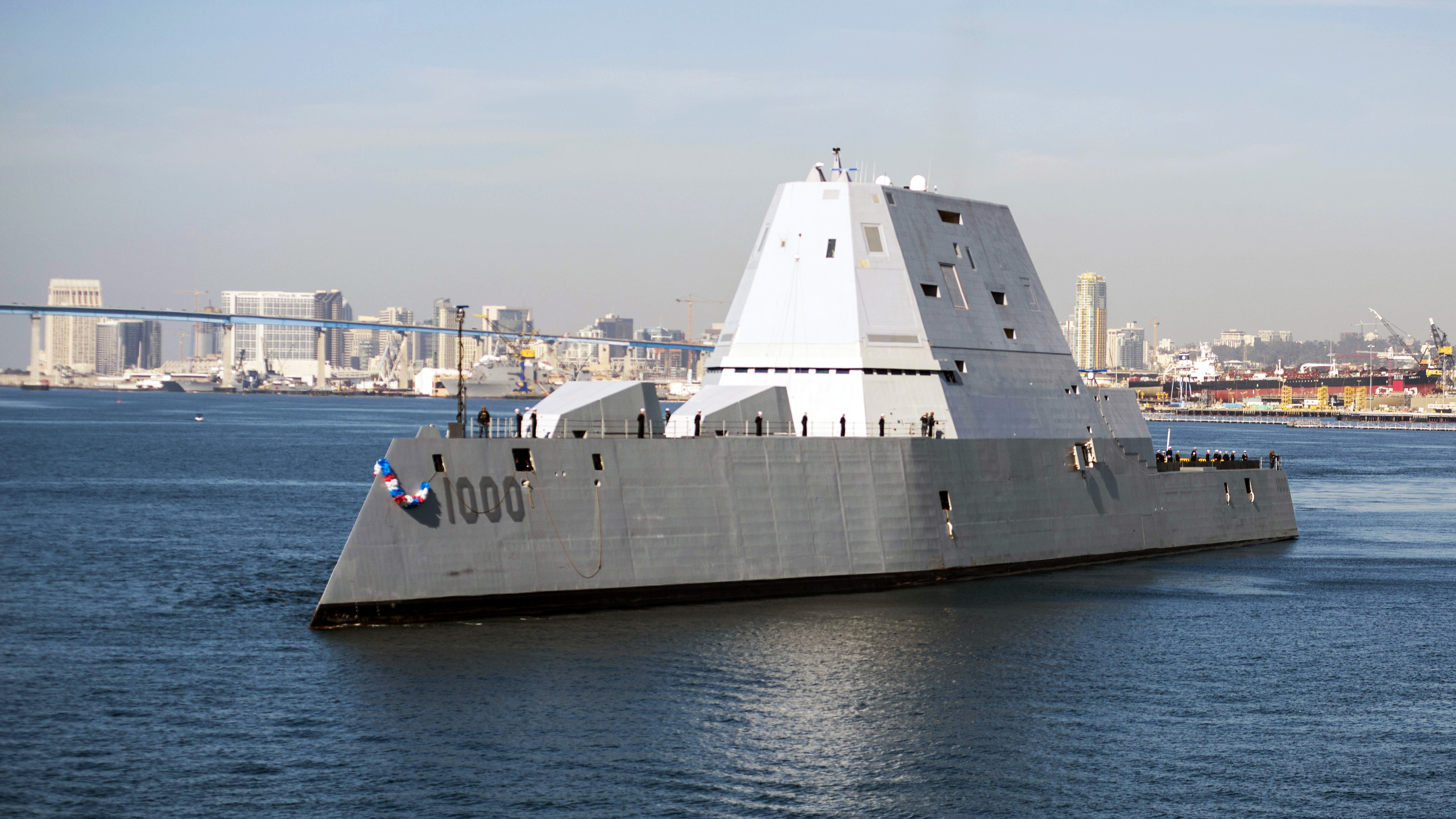
Zumwalt (DDG 1000) arrives at San Diego for the first time in 2016, which will be her first home port

On 21 November 2016, Zumwalt lost propulsion in her port shaft while passing through the Panama Canal from the Atlantic to the Pacific Ocean en route to her homeport in San Diego. Water had intruded in two of the four bearings that connect Zumwalt's port and starboard Advanced Induction Motors to the drive shafts. Both drive shafts failed and Zumwalt struck the lock walls in the canal, causing minor cosmetic damage. Zumwalt's passage through the Panama Canal had to be completed with tugboats. Zumwalt underwent repairs at Vasco Núñez de Balboa Naval Base near the Pacific end of the canal before continuing on to Naval Station San Diego. Upon the ship's arrival in San Diego, the leak was revealed to be through the lubrication cooling system, though the cause remains unknown. Sources close to the incident described the completion of the canal transit with tugboats a prudent measure, and lauded Captain Kirk for quick thinking and integrity to acknowledge the cooling system failure rather than risk damage to the propulsion system by steering the ship to the dock without assistance.

=== Post-delivery ===
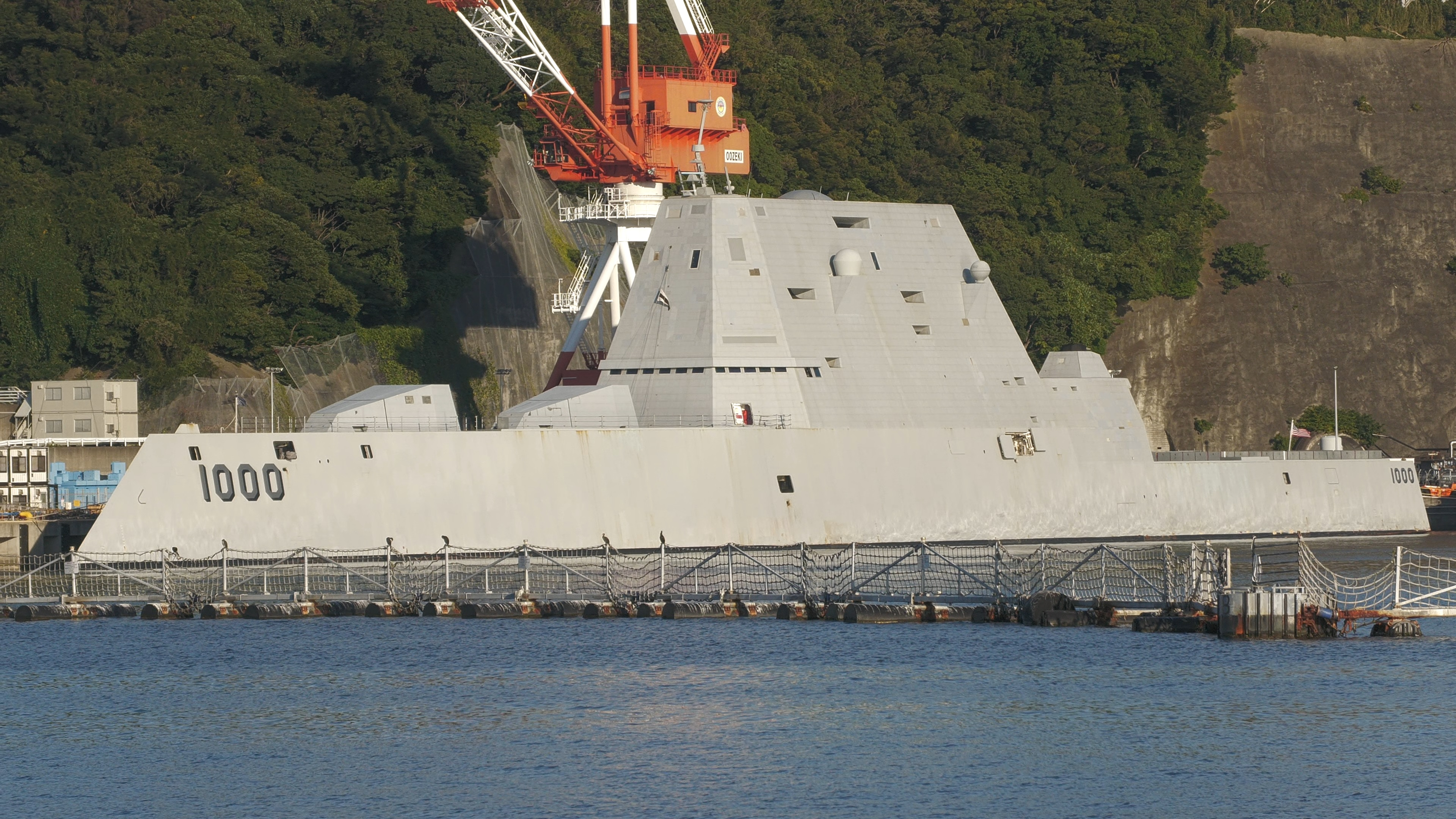
Zumwalt visits Yokosuka, Japan in 2022

In April 2019, Zumwalt departed San Diego for a first operational deployment into the Pacific since the shipyard availability conducted in 2017 and 2018. This patrol included a visit to Ketchikan, Alaska, during which Zumwalt's watch teams were able to conduct stability trials in stormy seas (Sea State 6), and Pearl Harbor, marking the first visit of a Zumwalt Class Destroyer to Hawaii. The Navy accepted final delivery in April 2020, preparing for more sea tests.

In September 2022 Zumwalt made her first port call in Guam during the longest voyage since the ship was commissioned en route to Japan.

On 1 August 2023, Zumwalt got underway to her new homeport in Ingalls Shipbuilding in Pascagoula, Mississippi for a modernization period and to receive technology upgrades.

Work was completed in December 2024, and she was refloated having had the two Gun Systems removed. The former forward gun mount was replaced with four launchers intended for the Intermediate-Range Conventional Prompt Strike (IRCPS) missile, with each canister capable of holding three missiles. The former aft gun mount is reserved for weapons yet to be specified.

On 22 April 2026, Zumwalt had suffered a fire on board the ship which injured three sailors while undergoing a modernization period in Ingalls Shipbuilding.
