= Carrier Strike Group 15 =

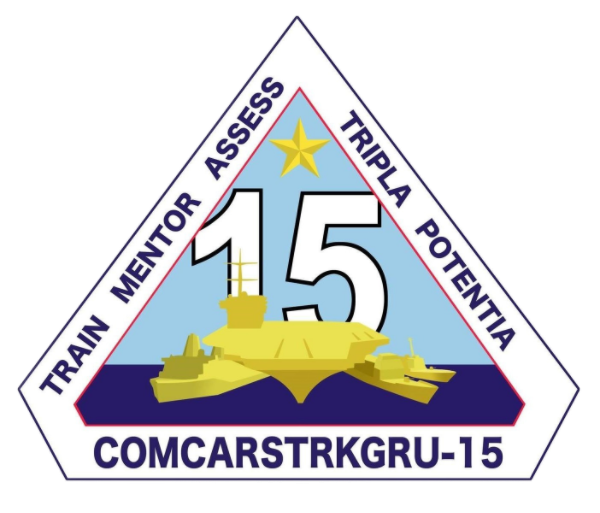
- Carrier Strike Group 15 logo
- Active: 2004–05, 29 April 2014 – present
- Country: United States
- Branch: United States Navy
- Role: Pacific Fleet Integrated/Advanced Strike Training
- Part of: U.S. Third Fleet
- Garrison/HQ: Naval Air Station North Island, California, U.S.

Commanders
- Commander: RDML Justin A. Kubu

Insignia
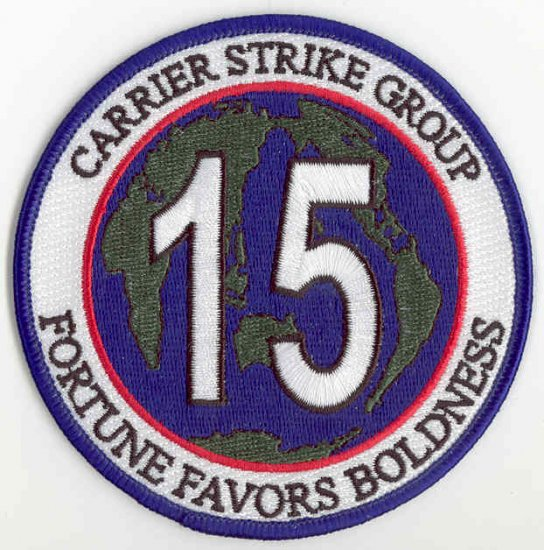
- Service patch

Carrier Strike Group 15, (CSG-15 or CARSTRKGRU 15, and sometimes spelled out, viz. "Fifteen") is a training formation of the United States Navy. It trains and certifies Pacific Fleet Carrier Strike Groups, Amphibious Ready Groups, and independently deploying surface ships. It replaced Commander, Strike Force Training Pacific in a title change. Carrier Strike Group Four is the equivalent command for US Fleet Forces (Atlantic Fleet) ships.

The group was one of fourteen U.S. Navy carrier strike groups established on 1 October 2004. Carrier strike groups are employed in a variety of roles, all of which involve gaining and maintaining sea control.

The group was established as Cruiser-Destroyer Group 1 circa 1973. It was redesignated Carrier Strike Group 15 in 2004 but then soon afterwards disbanded. Carrier Strike Group 15 was briefly based at Naval Station Norfolk, Virginia, in 2004, prior to changing its homeport to Naval Air Station North Island, California, in 2005, with the Nimitz class aircraft carrier USS Ronald Reagan (CVN-76) assigned as its flagship. It was then disbanded, but reestablished as a training formation in 2014.

== Cruiser-Destroyer Group 1 ==
In 1978, Norman Polmar writes that Cruiser-Destroyer Group 1, with its staff and all its subordinate units at San Diego, consisted of Destroyer Squadron 5, Destroyer Squadron 13, and Destroyer Squadron 23. In 1981, still at San Diego, the rear-admiral commanding also served as Commander Task Force 75, Surface Combatant Force, of the United States Seventh Fleet. Commander, Cruiser-Destroyer Group 1 led Battle Group Sierra to the Middle East in 1987. The Group consisted of USS Missouri (BB-63), USS Bunker Hill (CG-52), USS Long Beach (CGN-9), USS Hoel (DDG-13), USS Curts (FFG-38), and USS Kansas City (AOR-3). While part of the Third Fleet, Battle Group Sierra was designated Task Group 30.7, which changed to TG 70.10 when en route to the North Arabian Sea and Gulf of Oman.

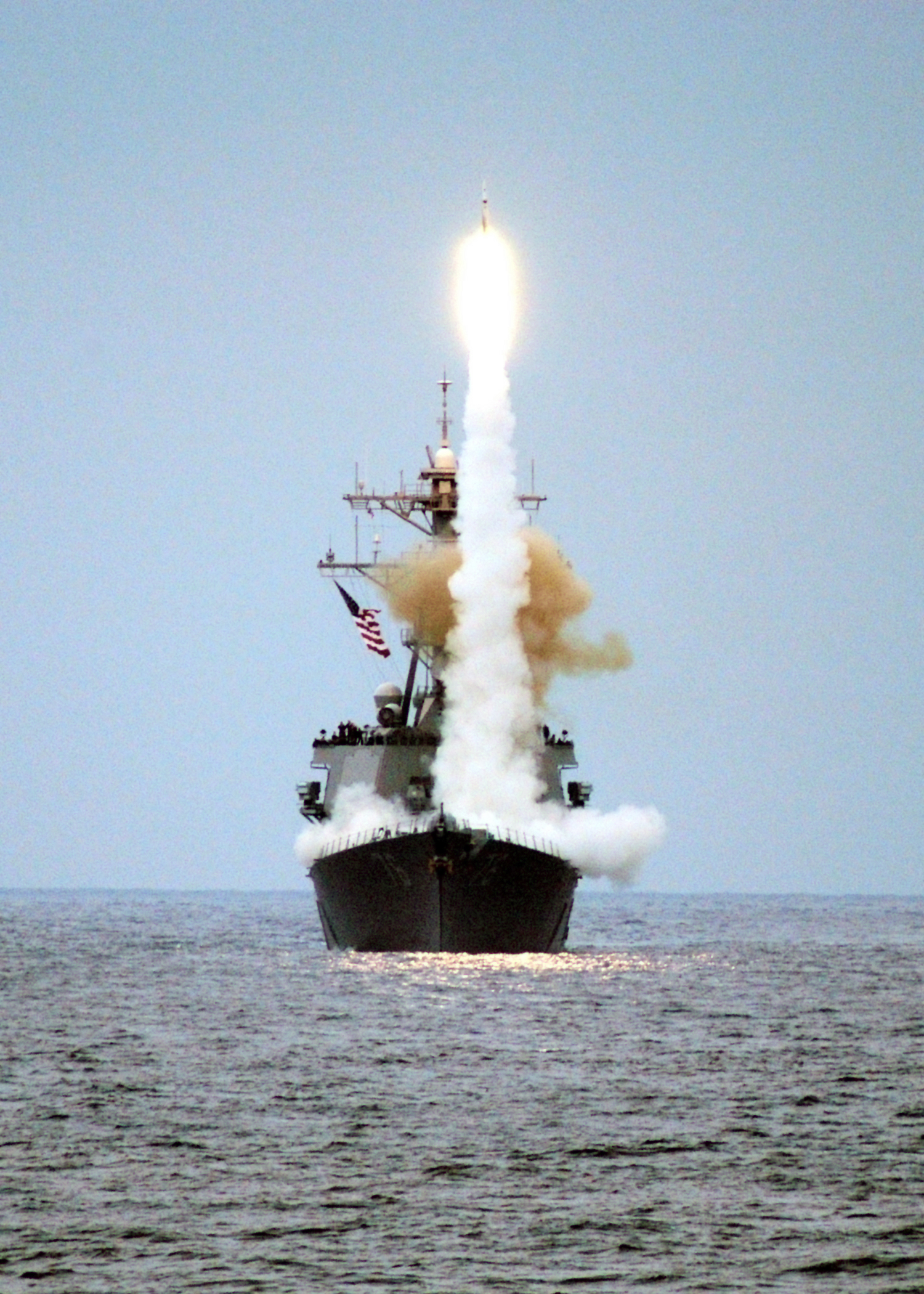
USS Higgins fires a Standard missile during workups prior to the 2002 deployment

Rear Admiral J. Paul Reason commanded Cruiser-Destroyer Group 1 from 1988 to November 1990, also commanding Battle Group Romeo during that period. Cruiser-Destroyer Group 1 was led by Constellation for its November 1994 – 1995 'Westpac '95' cruise. Effective 1 October 1995, Cruiser-Destroyer Group 1/USS Constellation Battle Group was to include the cruisers USS Lake Erie and USS Chosin. Then Rear Admiral Barry M. Costello became Commander, Cruiser-Destroyer Group 1 in June 2002. For Constellation's final cruise in 2002, Destroyer Squadron 7 provided the screen, being made up of Bunker Hill, Benfold, Valley Forge, Howard, Kinkaid, Milius, USS John Paul Jones (DDG-53), USS Higgins, and USS Thach.

Constellation's 20th deployment began on 16 March 2001. She entered the Persian Gulf on 30 April and immediately commenced operations in support of OSW. On 13 May, CAPT John W. Miller assumed command as Connie's 30th skipper, and her last. She ceased OSW operations on 4 August, having conducted multiple air strikes in response to Iraqi violations of the no-fly zone. "Connie" departed Pearl Harbor, Hawaii on 9 September with dependents on board for the traditional Tiger Cruise on the final leg to San Diego. On 11 September Constellation was nearly halfway between Pearl Harbor and San Diego when word was received of the September 11 terrorist attacks. Despite discussions about turning the battle group around, the carrier was allowed to complete her regularly scheduled deployment. Connie arrived in San Diego on Friday 14 September and celebrated her 40th birthday the next month.

Following an abbreviated turnaround cycle, Constellation prepared for her final deployment. She departed on 2 November 2002, leading Cruiser-Destroyer Group 1 under the command of Rear Admiral Barry M. Costello. She was soon supporting Operation Enduring Freedom; on 17 December she entered the Persian Gulf to begin OSW missions. On 19 March 2003, with two carriers in the eastern Mediterranean and three in the Persian Gulf, Operation Iraqi Freedom commenced. Connie was designated a night carrier and remained on station throughout the major ground combat phase. She launched more than 1,500 sorties and CVW-2 aircraft delivered over 1.7 million pounds (770,000 kg) of ordnance. While one aircraft was lost in an operational mishap, there were no fatalities.

Before 2004 (2003?), Cruiser-Destroyer Group One included USS Constellation, USS Bunker Hill, and USS Lake Erie.

== South American transit 2004 ==
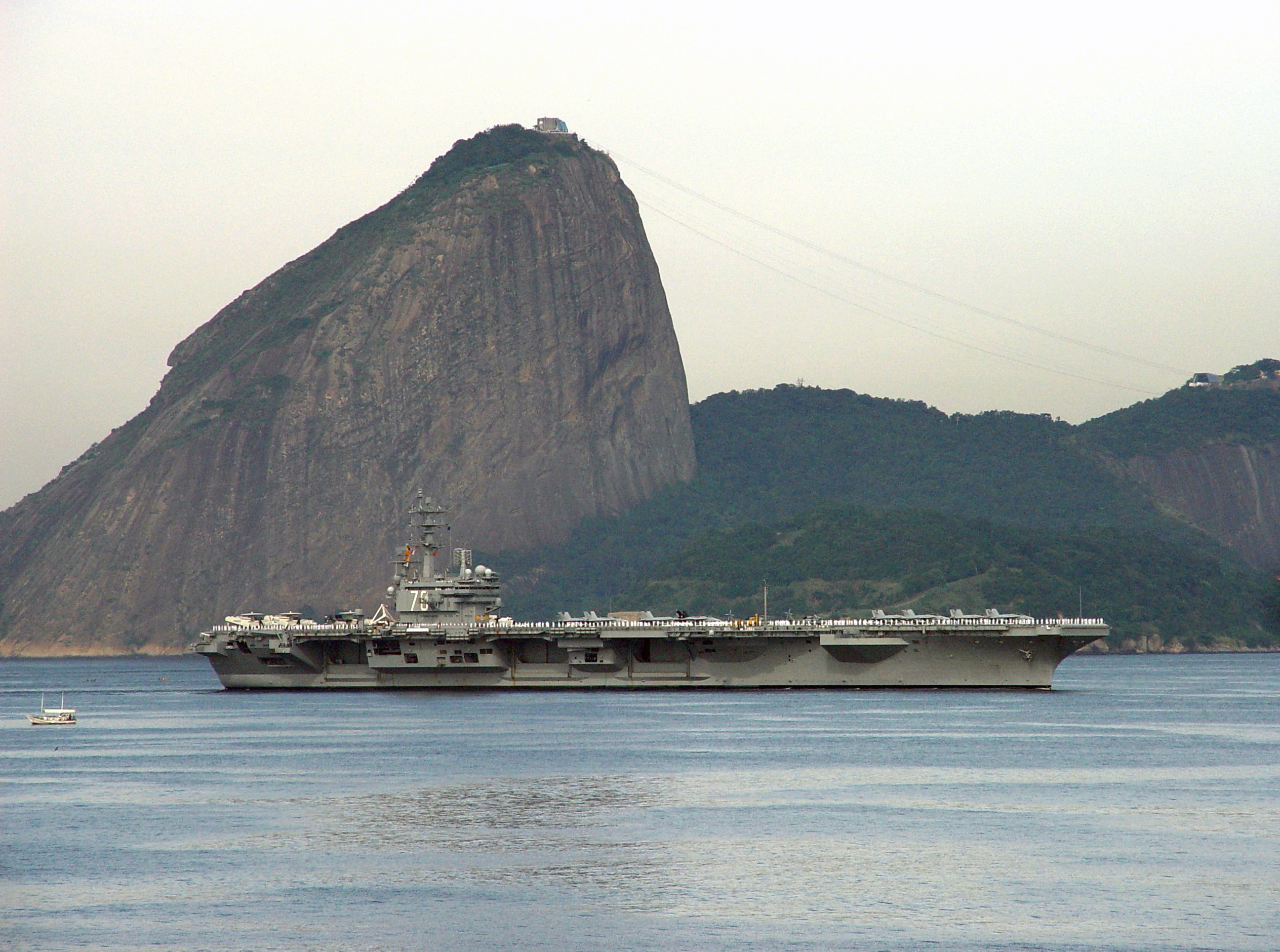
Rio de Janeiro

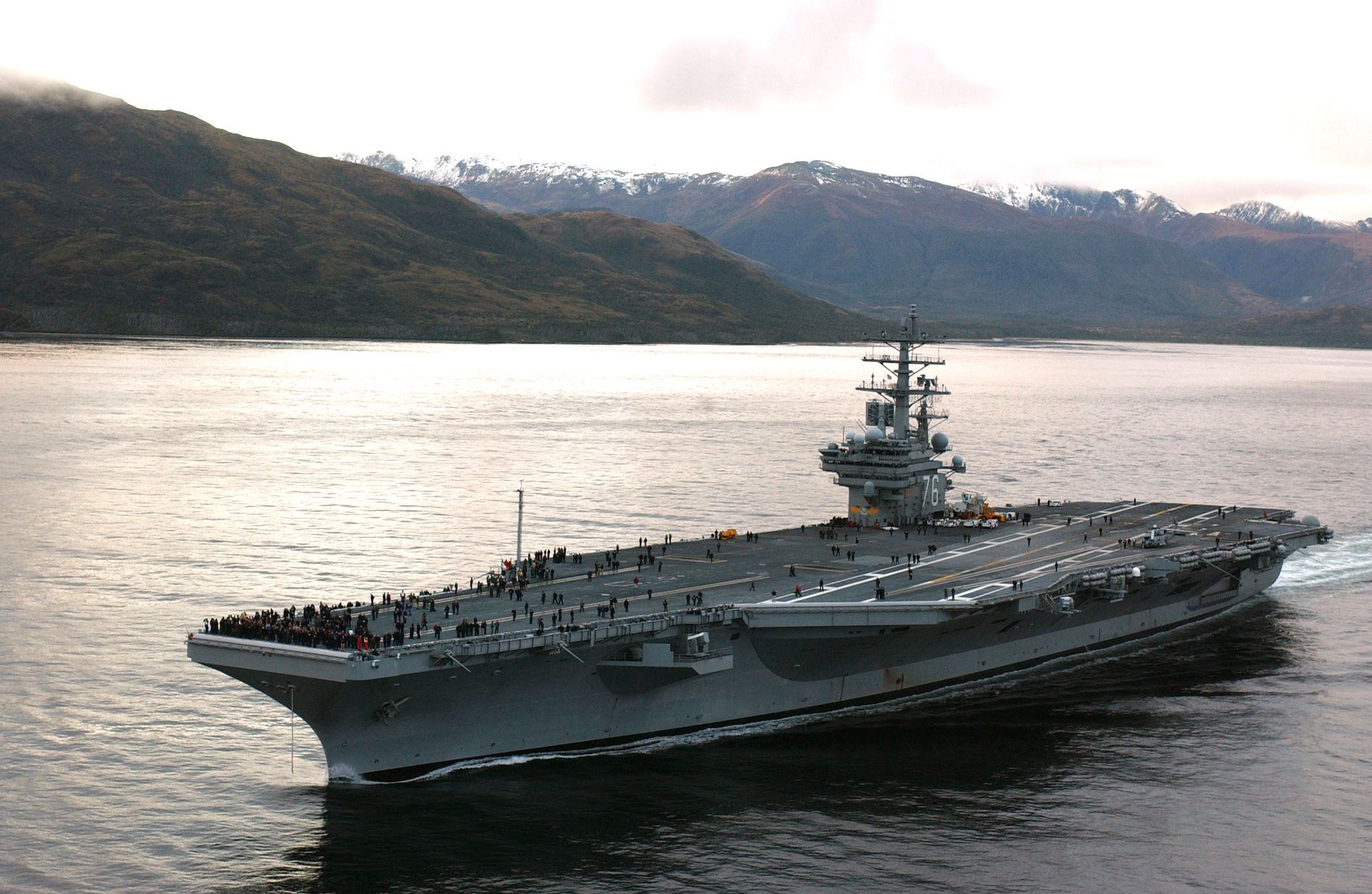
Reagan transits the Strait of Magellan

On 27 May 2004, the carrier Ronald Reagan departed from Naval Station Norfolk, Virginia, to move to her new homeport of Naval Air Station North Island, California. While the homeport change cruise was underway, many U.S. Navy aircraft carriers were active simultaneously, an occurrence grouped by the Navy as 'Exercise Summer Pulse'. Rear Admiral Robert T. Moeller, Commander, Cruiser-Destroyer Group One (CCDG-1), and his group staff, led the deployment. Admiral Moeller oversaw all the training exercises and the transit of Reagan to San Diego. The following squadrons of Carrier Air Wing Eleven (CVW-11) were temporarily embarked on board the Ronald Reagan:

- Strike Fighter Squadron 41 (VFA-41): F/A-18F Super Hornet
- Strike Fighter Squadron 14 (VFA-14): F/A-18E Super Hornet
- Carrier Airborne Early Warning Squadron 117 (VAW-117): E-2C Hawkeye 2000
- Helicopter Antisubmarine Squadron 6 (HS-6): SH-60 Seahawk
- Fleet Logistics Support Squadron 30 (VRC-30): Grumman C-2 Greyhound

Carrier Air Wing Eleven was normally embarked on board the carrier USS Nimitz (CVN-68), and the main purpose for embarking these CVW-11 squadrons on board Reagan was to complete their training evolutions prior to their next Western Pacific deployment. While underway, on 15 June 2004, the crew of the Reagan held a memorial service for its namesake following its first foreign port visit to Rio de Janeiro, Brazil, on 3 June (pictured). Reagan subsequently paid port visits to Valparaíso, Chile, and Callao, Peru, prior to arriving at its new homeport of Naval Air Station North Island, California, on 23 July 2004.

=== Exercises & port visits ===
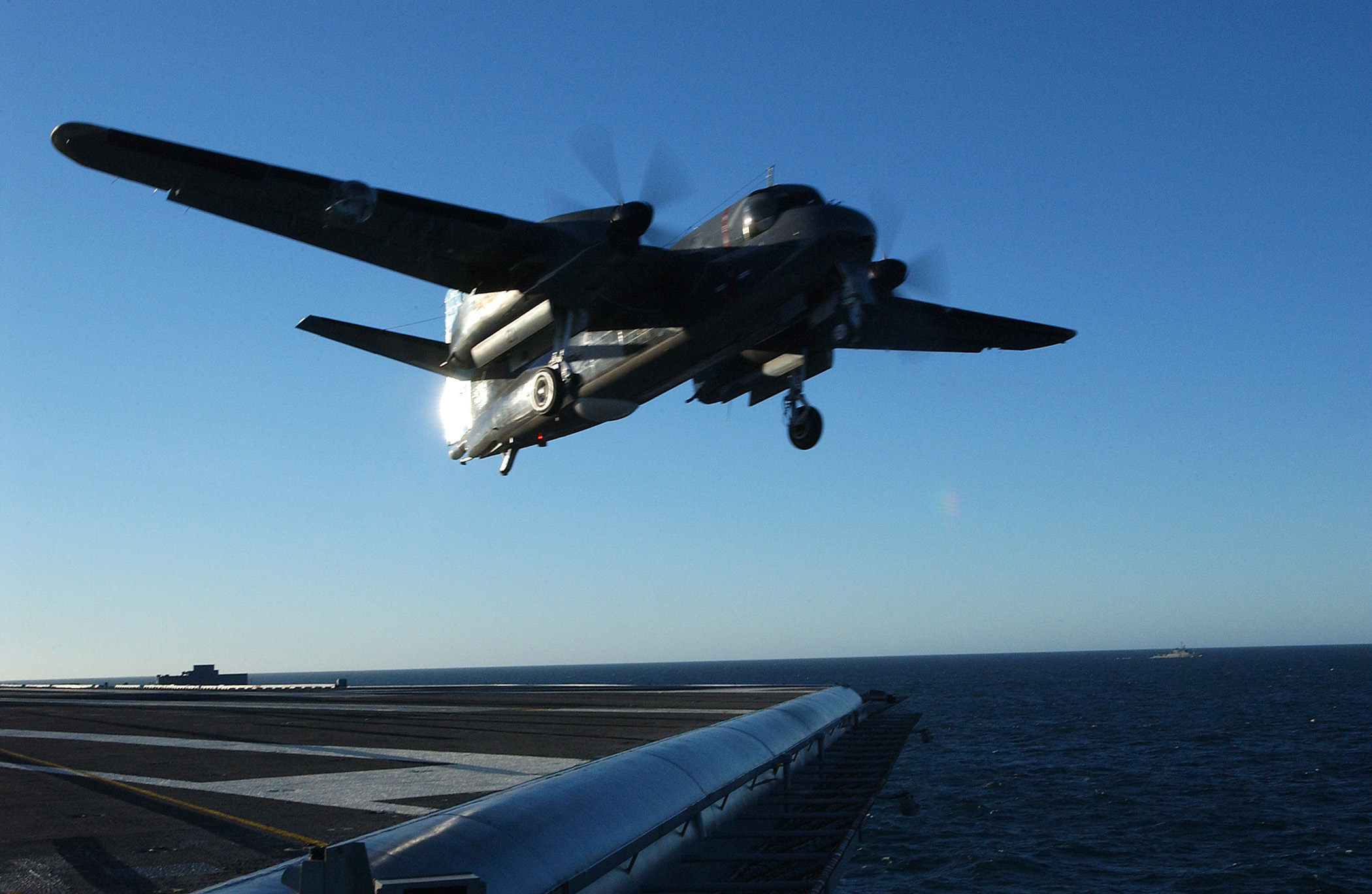
Gringo-Gaucho

During its inter-fleet transfer, the carrier Reagan and its embarked CVW-11 aircraft participated on several bilateral and multilateral naval exercises. On 17 June 2004, two Super Étendard jet fighters and three S-2T Turbo Trackers antisubmarine aircraft from the Argentine Navy carried out touch-and-go landings on the Reagan's flight deck during Gringo-Gaucho exercises (pictured). The Reagan Carrier Strike Group also participated in a SIFOREX (Silent Forces) exercise with the Peruvian Navy prior to its port visit to Callao, Peru, on 9 July 2004.

The largest exercise involving Cruiser-Destroyer Group 1 during the transit was UNITAS 45-04, the biggest multinational naval exercise held in Latin America. Joining the carrier Reagan and Carrier Air Wing Eleven (CVW-11) were the guided-missile cruiser Thomas S. Gates, the dock landing ship Tortuga, and the guided-missile destroyers Mustin and Benfold.

UNITAS 45-04 included naval forces from Argentina, Bolivia, Chile, Dominican Republic, Ecuador, Paraguay, Peru, United States, and Uruguay, with observers from Colombia and Mexico, and it was hosted by Peru and sponsored by Rear Admiral Vinson Smith, commander, Commander U.S. Naval Forces Southern Command (Task Force 138). While it featured jungle warfare, peacekeeping, and humanitarian operations, the highlight of UNITAS 45-04 was the first multi-national amphibious assault exercise held in Latin America on 24 June 2004, with close air support provided by Carrier Air Wing Eleven and the Peruvian Air Force.

On 6 August 2004, Rear Admiral Robert J. Cox relieved Rear Admiral Robert T. Moeller as Commander Cruiser Destroyer Group One (CCDG-1) during a change-of-command ceremony held on the flight deck of USS Ronald Reagan (CVN-76). Admiral Moeller's next assignment was as Director, Plans and Policy (J-5) at U.S. Central Command.

On 1 October 2004, Commander Cruiser-Destroyer Group One was re-designated as Carrier Strike Group 15.

On 11 January 2005, Ronald Reagan departed San Diego, transporting two VRC-30 C-2A Greyhound aircraft for use in Operation Unified Assistance. After a 12-day underway period, Reagan paid a three-day port visit to Hawaii beginning 22 January.

On 21 March 2005, Carrier Strike Group 15 was disestablished, and Reagan was reassigned as the flagship of Carrier Strike Group 7.

== Re-establishment ==
On 29 April 2014, Commander, Strike Force Training Pacific was disestablished, and Carrier Strike Group 15 reestablished.

In January 2016, Rear Admiral Rick Williams, Commander Carrier Strike Group 15, was relieved of his duties. Stars and Stripes reported that it was revealed during a routine inspection that Williams had violated Navy rules by looking at pornographic images on his government computer.

At a later stage, then-Rear Admiral Lisa Franchetti commanded the strike group.
